= Roman cities in Britain =

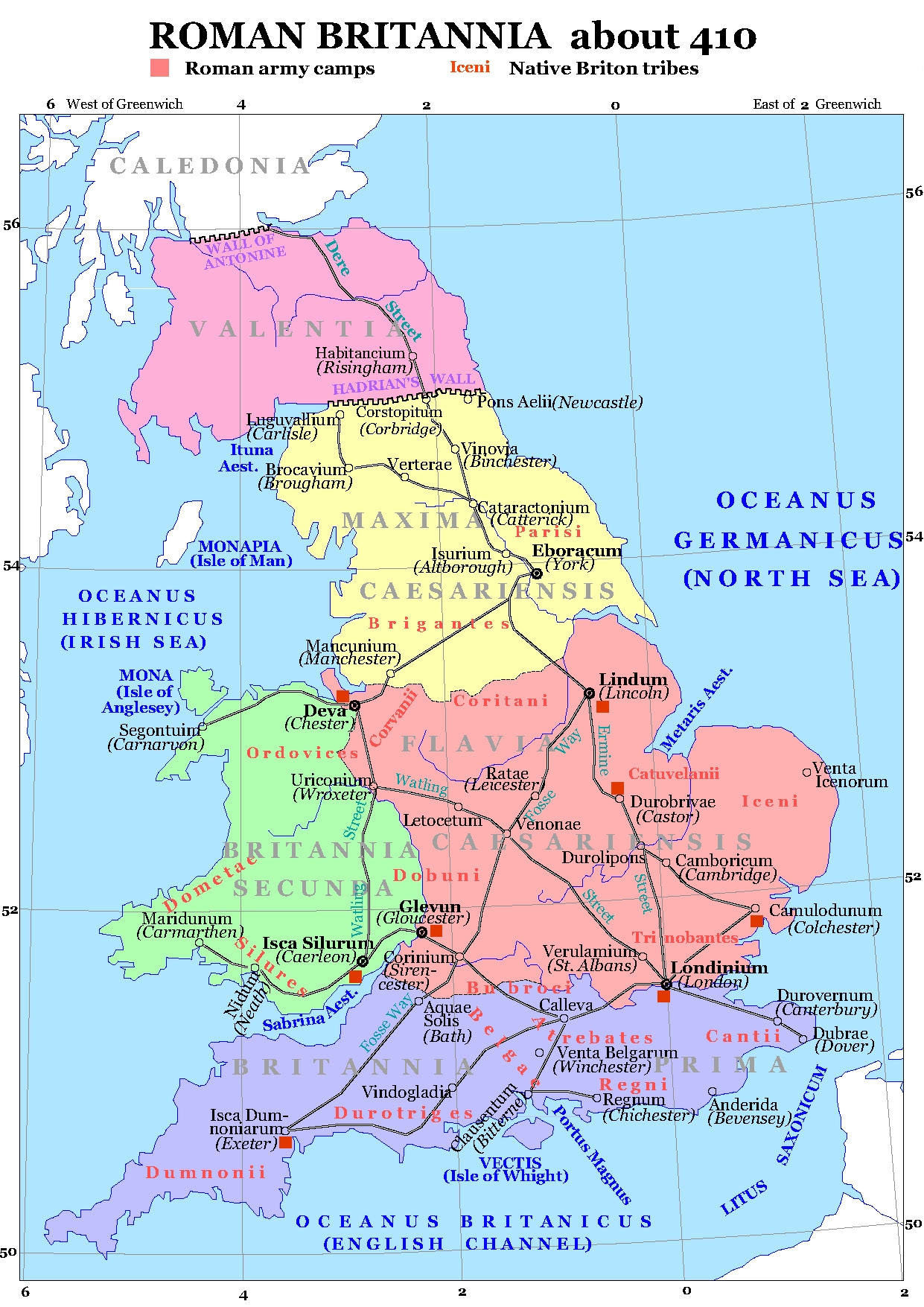
Traditional arrangement of the Roman provinces after Camden,

This is a list of cities in Great Britain during the period of Roman occupation from 43 AD to the 5th century.

Roman cities were known as civitas in Latin. They were mostly fortified settlements where native tribal peoples lived, governed by the Roman officials. The majority of the cities (civitates) listed are either former Iron Age tribal capitals, strategic settlements on Roman roads, trading posts between tribal groups or, occasionally, ports, although the latter two were more usually not defined as civitas. A small number of these cities were settlements of Roman origin, the most famous of which is Aquae Sulis, modern day Bath. At least 26 of the current 63 cities in England and Wales were fortified civitates during the Roman era, the most famous being Camulodunum, modern day Colchester, the first capital of the Roman province of Britannia, and Londinium, modern day London, the later capital of the province and current capital of both England and the United Kingdom today.

This list covers cities throughout Great Britain but does not include Cornwall or Scotland where the Romans had less influence. The list shows the modern (Anglo-Saxon) settlement names as well as the native Brythonic and Roman names for the settlement. Civitates were prefixed with Caer in Brythonic which roughly equates to the same word in modern Welsh, meaning "stronghold", "fortress", or "citadel", usually written in Anglo-Saxon as -caster, -cester, and -chester. The eighth century Welsh monastic author of the Historia Brittonum, Nennius, recorded 28 civitates, which together make up a large proportion of the cities in this list (26 out of the 28 are listed with their likely locations, but several are by no means certain). However, "Caer Custoeint" and "Caer Brithon" are not included, the former having an unknown location and the latter being in Scotland and unlikely to actually have been a Roman civitas. Many of the Roman civitates transitioned into Anglo-Saxon settlements during the Dark Ages, remaining as cities or large towns today. Others, however, fell into disrepair and little but ruins remain, often close to small villages.

Modern Settlement	Brythonic Name	Roman Name	Tribe Associated	Historic County	Flag	Current Status	Image	Mentioned by Nennius
Alcester	Caer Alen	Alauna	Local Tribe	Warwickshire		Town		No
Aldborough	Caer Isurion	Isurium Brigantum	Brigantes	West Riding of Yorkshire		Village		No
Bath	Caer Baddon	Aquae Sulis	Roman Settlement	Somerset		City		No
Brough	Caer Petuar	Petuaria	Parisi	East Riding of Yorkshire		Town		No
Builth Wells	Caer Peris	Unknown	Ordovices & Silures	Brecknockshire		Town		Yes
Caernarfon	Caer Segeint	Segontium	Ordovices	Caernarfonshire		Town		Yes
Caistor (Thancaster)	Caer Correi	Caistor	Corieltauvi	Lincolnshire		Town		No
Cambridge	Caer Grauth	Duroliponte	Catuvellauni	Cambridgeshire		City		Yes
Canterbury	Caer Ceint	Durovernum Cantiacorum	Cantiaci	Kent		City		Yes
Cardiff	Caer Teim	Tamium	Silures	Glamorgan		City		No
Carlisle Capital of Britannia Valentia	Caer Ligualid	Luguvalium	Carvetii	Cumberland		City		Yes
Carmarthen	Caer Merddyn	Moridunum	Demetae	Carmarthenshire		Town		Unlikely
Catterick	Caer Catarauc	Cataractonium	Brigantes	North Riding of Yorkshire		Village		Yes
Chepstow (Caerwent)	Caer Guent (possibly)	Venta Silurum	Silures	Monmouthshire		Town (Village)		Yes
Chester	Caer Legion	Deva Victrix	Cornovii (Midlands)	Cheshire		City		Yes
Chichester	Caer Cei	Noviomagus Reginorum	Regni	Sussex		City		No
Cirencester Capital of Britannia Prima	Caer Ceri	Corinium Dobunnorum	Dobunni	Gloucestershire		Town		No
Colchester Early Capital of Britannia	Caer Colun	Camulodunum	Trinovantes	Essex		City (2022)		Yes
Conwy (Caerhun)	Caer Canovion (Informally)	Canovium Deceangorum	Deceangli	Denbighshire		Town (Village)		No
Doncaster	Caer Daun	Danum	Roman Settlement	West Riding of Yorkshire		City (2022)		Yes
Dorchester	Caer Durnac	Durnovaria	Durotriges	Dorset		Town		No
Dunster	Caer Draitou	Unknown	Dumnonii	Somerset		Village		Yes
Durham (Binchester)	Caer Weir	Vinovia	Brigantes	County Durham		City (Village)		No
Exeter	Caer Uisc	Isca Dumnoniorum	Dumnonii	Devon		City		No
Gloucester Capital of Britannia Secunda	Caer Glout	Glevum	Dobunii	Gloucestershire		City		No
Hereford (Kenchester)	Caer Fawydd	Magnae Dobunnorum	Dobunni	Herefordshire		City (Village)		No
Ilchester	Caer Pensa vel Coyt	Lindinis	Lendinienses, part of Durotriges?	Somerset		Village		Yes
Leicester	Caer Lerion	Ratae Corieltauvorum	Corieltauvi	Leicestershire		City		Yes
Lichfield (Wall)	Caer Luit coyt	Letocetum	Cornovii (Midlands) & Corieltauvi	Staffordshire		City (Village)		Yes
Lincoln Capital of Britannia Flavia	Caer Lind-colun	Lindum Colonia	Corieltauvi	Lincolnshire		City		No
City of London Later Capital of Britannia	Caer Londein	Londinium	Catuvellauni & Trinovantes	Middlesex		City		Yes
Manchester	Caer Maunguid	Mamucium	Roman Settlement	Lancashire		City		Yes
Monmouth (The Doward)	Caer Guorthigirn	Blestium	Silures	Monmouthshire / Herefordshire		Town (Village)		Yes, Probably
Norwich (Caistor St Edmund)	Caer Guin Truis (possibly)	Venta Icenorum	Iceni	Norfolk		City (Village)		No
Newport (Caerleon)	Caer legion guar uisc	Isca Augusta	Silures	Monmouthshire		City (Town)		Yes
Portsmouth (Portchester)	Caer Portus	Portus Adurni	Belgae	Hampshire		City (Village)		No
Rochester	Caer Dourbruf	Durobrivae Cantiacorum	Cantiaci	Kent		Town		No
Salisbury (Old Sarum)	Caer Sallwg	Sorbiodunum	Atrebates	Wiltshire		City		Yes
Shrewsbury (Wroxeter)	Caer Guricon	Viroconium Cornoviorum	Cornovii (Midlands)	Shropshire		Town (Village)		Yes
Silchester	Caer Celemion	Calleva Atrebatum	Atrebates	Hampshire		Village		Yes
St Albans	Caer Municep	Verulamium	Catuvellauni	Hertfordshire		City		Yes
Whitchurch	Caer Meguidd	Mediolanum	Cornovii (Midlands)	Shropshire		Town		Yes
Winchester	Caer Guent (possibly)	Venta Belgarum	Belgae	Hampshire		City		Yes
Worcester	Caer Guiragon	Vertis	Dobunii & Cornovii (Midlands)	Worcestershire		City		Yes
York Capital of Britannia Maxima	Caer Ebrauc	Eboracum	Brigantes	Yorkshire		City		Yes
