= Abbotsbury Castle =

Iron Age hillfort in Dorset, England

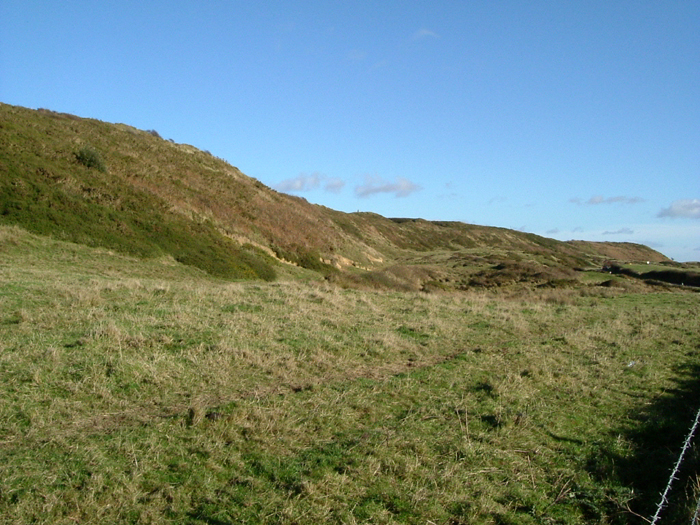
- The earthworks at Abbotsbury castle

- Map showing the location of Abbotsbury Castle within Dorset.
- 50.68°N 2.63°W
- Type: Hillfort
- Periods: Iron Age
- Cultures: Durotriges
- Location: Abbotsbury, Dorset

Site notes
- Area: 10 acres (4.0 ha)
- Public access: Yes

Scheduled monument
- Official name: Abbotsbury Castle (camp)
- Reference no.: 1002710

Abbotsbury Castle is an Iron Age hillfort in south west Dorset, England, situated on Wears Hill above the village of Abbotsbury, seven miles west of Dorchester and the famous hill fort at Maiden Castle.

It is situated on a high chalk hill overlooking the English Channel, and in its day was the front line of defence from invasion. The earthworks cover an area of about 10 acres (4.0 ha), of which about 4.5 acres (1.8 ha) are inside the ramparts.

The fort was occupied by the Celtic Durotriges tribe, but when the Romans invaded in AD 43, the second Augustian legion of Vespasian took the fort quickly with little struggle before moving on to Maiden Castle. There is no evidence that the Romans settled at Abbotsbury Castle as they did at some other hill forts.

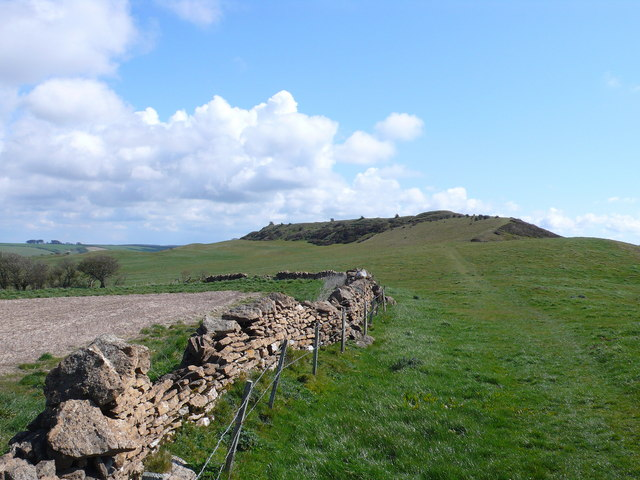
Abbotsbury Castle seen from Tulks Hill
