= Maiden Castle, Dorset =

Iron Age hill fort in Dorset, England

Maiden Castle
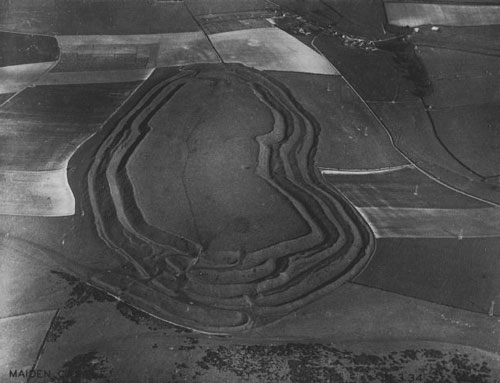
- Maiden Castle in 1934

- Location within Dorset
- 50.695°N 2.470°W
- Type: Hillfort
- Periods: Iron Age
- Cultures: Durotriges
- Location: Winterborne St Martin, Dorset grid reference SY669884

History
- Built: 600 BC (first hill fort); 450 BC (developed hill fort)

Site notes
- Area: 6.4 ha (16 acres) (first hill fort); 19 ha (47 acres) (developed hill fort)
- Archaeologists: Augustus Pitt-Rivers Mortimer Wheeler Tessa Verney Wheeler
- Owner: English Heritage
- Public access: Yes

Scheduled monument
- Official name: Maiden Castle
- Designated: 9 October 1981
- Reference no.: 1015775

Maiden Castle is an Iron Age hillfort 1.6 mi (2.6 km) southwest of Dorchester, in the English county of Dorset. Hill forts were fortified hill-top settlements constructed across Britain during the Iron Age. The earliest archaeological evidence of human activity on the site consists of a Neolithic causewayed enclosure and bank barrow. Around 1800 BC during the Bronze Age, the site was used for growing crops before being abandoned. Maiden Castle itself was built around 600 BC; the early phase was a simple and unremarkable site, similar to many other hill forts in Britain and covering 6.4 ha (16 acres).

Around 450 BC it was greatly expanded and the enclosed area nearly tripled in size to 19 ha (47 acres), making it the largest hill fort in Britain and, by some definitions, the largest in Europe. At the same time, Maiden Castle's defences were made more complex with the addition of further ramparts and ditches. Around 100 BC, habitation at the hill fort went into decline and became concentrated at the eastern end of the site. It was occupied until at least the Roman period, by which time it was in the territory of the Durotriges, a Celtic tribe.

After the Roman conquest of Britain in the 1st century AD, Maiden Castle appears to have been abandoned, although the Romans may have had a military presence on the site. In the late 4th century, a temple and ancillary buildings were constructed. In the 6th century, the hill top was entirely abandoned and was used only for agriculture during the medieval period.

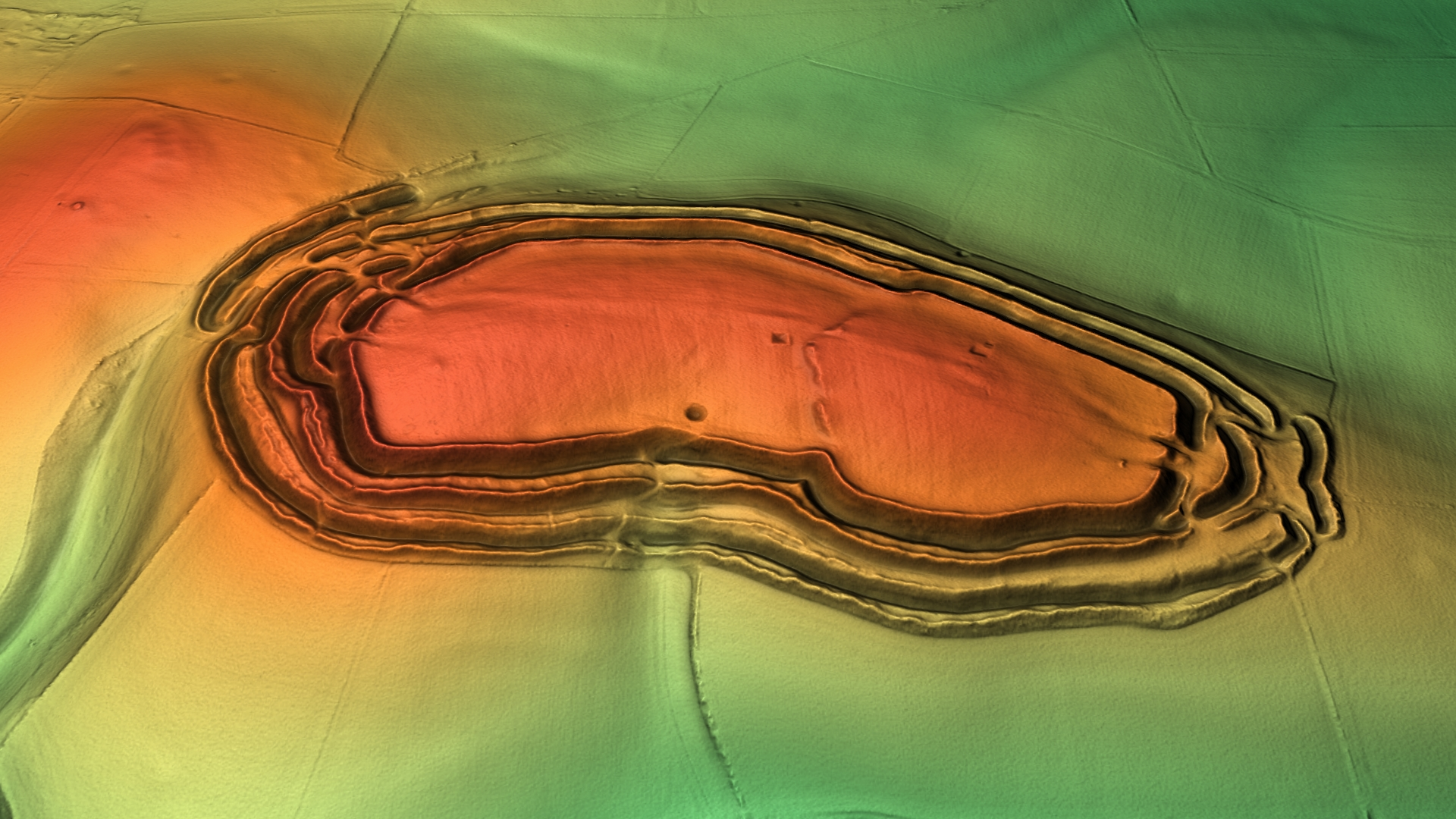
3D view of the digital terrain model

Maiden Castle 3D model video

Maiden Castle has provided inspiration for composer John Ireland and authors Thomas Hardy and John Cowper Powys. The study of hill forts was popularised in the 19th century by archaeologist Augustus Pitt Rivers. In the 1930s, archaeologist Mortimer Wheeler and Tessa Verney Wheeler undertook the first archaeological excavations at Maiden Castle, raising its profile among the public. Further excavations were carried out under Niall Sharples, which added to an understanding of the site and repaired damage caused in part by the large number of visitors. Today the site is protected as a Scheduled Monument and is maintained by English Heritage.

== Before the fort ==
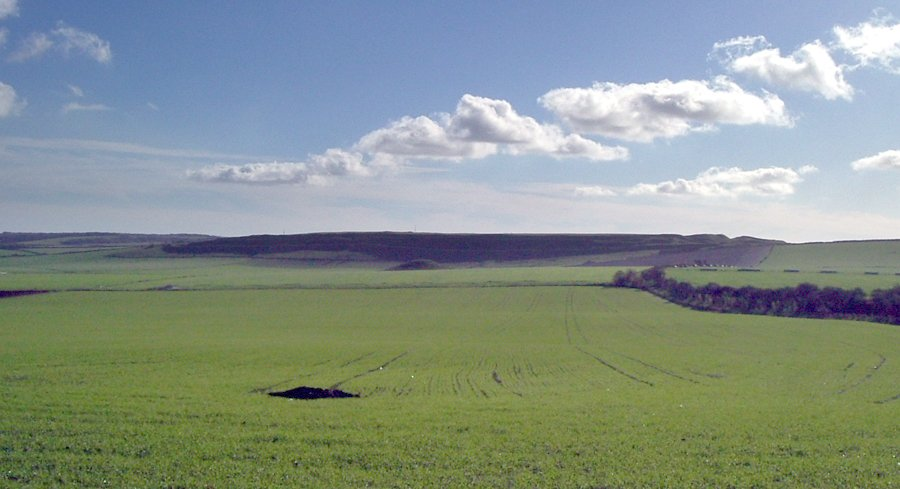
Maiden Castle from the north

Before the hill fort was built, a Neolithic causewayed enclosure was constructed on the site. Dating from around 4000 BC, it was an oval area enclosed by two ditches, It is called a causewayed enclosure because the way the ditches were dug meant that there would originally have been gaps. These gaps, and the bank being only 17 cm (6.7 in) high, indicate the site would not have been defensive. Instead the ditches may have been symbolic, separating the interior of the enclosure and its activities from the outside. Archaeologist Niall Sharples, who was involved in excavating the hill fort in the 1980s, has identified the hilltop views of the surrounding landscape as a likely factor for the enclosure's position. Situated on the side of the hill, it would have been visible from several miles away, and when first cut the ditches would have exposed the underlying white chalk and stood out against the green hillside. The interior of the enclosure has been disturbed by later habitation and farming. The site does not appear to have been inhabited, although a grave containing the remains of two children, aged 6–7, has been discovered. The enclosure is the earliest evidence of human activity on the site.

The purpose of Neolithic causewayed enclosures is unclear, and they probably had a variety of functions. In addition to the burials, which indicate the site at Maiden Castle was important for rituals related to death, pottery from the coast and areas to the east and west was found here, indicating that the site was a meeting place that attracted people over long distances. Radiocarbon dating indicates that the enclosure was abandoned around 3,400 BC. Arrowheads discovered in the ditches may indicate that activity at the enclosure met a violent end.

Within a period of about 50 years, a bank barrow was built over the enclosure. It was a 546 m (1,791 ft) long mound of earth with a ditch on either side; the parallel ditches were 19.5 m (64 ft) apart. Many barrows lie over graves and are monuments to the deceased, but as the barrow at Maiden Castle did not cover any burials, scholars have suggested that it was a boundary marker. This would explain the limited human activity on the hilltop for the 500 years after the bank barrow's construction.

Around 1,800 BC, during the early Bronze Age, the hill was cleared and used to grow crops, but the soil was quickly exhausted and the site abandoned. This period of abandonment lasted until the Iron Age, when the hill fort was built. The bank barrow survived into the Iron Age as a low mound, and throughout this period construction over it was avoided.

== First hill fort ==
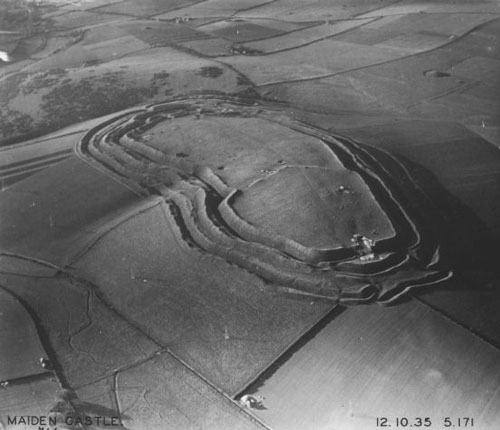
The white line across the hill fort where the ramparts deviate inwards marks the extent of the early fort. Photograph taken in 1935 by Major George Allen (1891–1940).

Hill forts developed in the Late Bronze Age and Early Iron Age, roughly the start of the first millennium BC. The reason for their emergence in Britain, and their purpose, has been a subject of debate. It has been argued that they could have been defensive sites constructed in response to invasion from continental Europe, built by invaders, or a military reaction to social tensions caused by an increasing population and resulting pressure on agriculture.

Since the 1960s, the dominant view has been that the increasing use of iron led to social changes in Britain. Deposits of iron ore were located in different places to the tin and copper ore necessary to make bronze. As a result, trading patterns shifted, and the old elites lost their economic and social status. Power passed into the hands of a new group of people.

Archaeologist Barry Cunliffe believes that population increase still played a role and has stated that

[the forts] provided defensive possibilities for the community at those times when the stress [of an increasing population] burst out into open warfare. But I wouldn't see them as having been built because there was a state of war. They would be functional as defensive strongholds when there were tensions and undoubtedly some of them were attacked and destroyed, but this was not the only, or even the most significant, factor in their construction.

There are around 31 hill forts in Dorset; archaeologist Sharples, who undertook excavations at Maiden Castle, proposed that hill forts were used to control agricultural land to support a large community. Those in Dorset were situated near expanses of fertile land. Monumental defences such as the ditch at Maiden Castle indicate that the land was disputed and communities fought each other for control. This is supported by Cunliffe, who argues that the elaborate earthworks such as those around the entrances to Maiden Castle and Danebury were used to defend the weakest part of the hill fort. They increased the time the attackers took to reach the gateway, which would have left them vulnerable to defenders armed with slings. Hoards of carefully selected sling stones have been found at both sites.

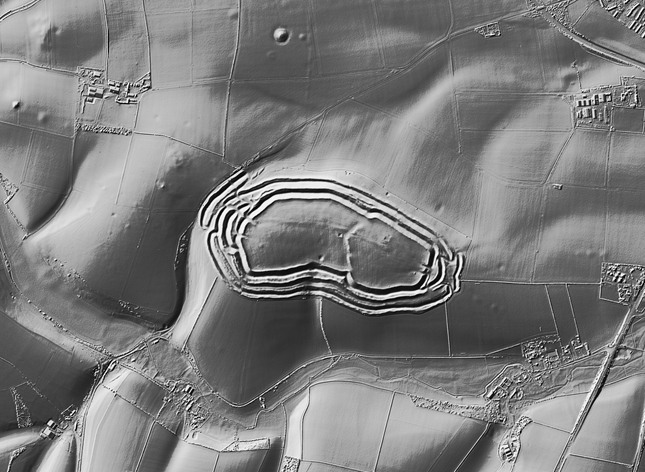
Maiden Castle LIDAR topography

Constructed on a territorial boundary in about 600 BC, the first hill fort at Maiden Castle was a 6.4 ha (16-acre) area surrounded by a single ditch. The hill it sits on is part of a ridge on the north side of the South Winterborne valley, which feeds the River Frome. At the eastern end of the ridge and rising 132 m (433 ft) above sea level, the site of the first hill fort was not the highest point along the ridge. The highest point is the neighbouring Hog Hill, which is only 1 m (3.3 ft) higher. The hill projects about 40 m (131 ft) above the surrounding countryside, which is about 90 m (295 ft) above sea level. The defences were 8.4 m (28 ft) high and consisted of the V-shaped ditch and a rampart. The rampart would probably have been timber-faced around just the entrances. Elaborate timber facing would have been used to impress visitors. The site could be accessed by an entrance in the northwest and a double entrance in the east. The double entrance is unique in hill forts in the British Isles. The reason for a double entrance is unclear; however, archaeologist Niall Sharples has suggested that it was a form of segregation. It is likely that several farming communities lived in the hill fort and wanted different entrances.

The defences of the first hill fort were rebuilt on at least one occasion; the ditch was deepened by 1.5 to 7 m (4.9 to 23.0 ft). The spoil from re-digging the ditch was deposited on the back of the rampart. At the same time, the defences around the eastern entrances were made more complex. A bank and ditch were built outside the two entrances, and a bank was erected between them. The bank had a wall faced with limestone, which was brought from more than 3 km (2 mi) away. Sharples believes this would have created an impressive entrance and was a demonstration of the settlement's high status. The Early Iron Age archaeology has been largely destroyed due to later activity on the site. However, nearby Poundbury and Chalbury date to the same period, so through comparison it is possible to infer the Early Iron Age activity at Maiden Castle. From parallels at these sites, Sharples deduces that it was probably densely occupied, with separate areas for habitation and storage. Not much is known about the material culture and economy of the Early Iron Age, and the paucity of finds from this period at Maiden Castle makes it difficult to draw conclusions about activity on the site.

== Developed hill fort ==
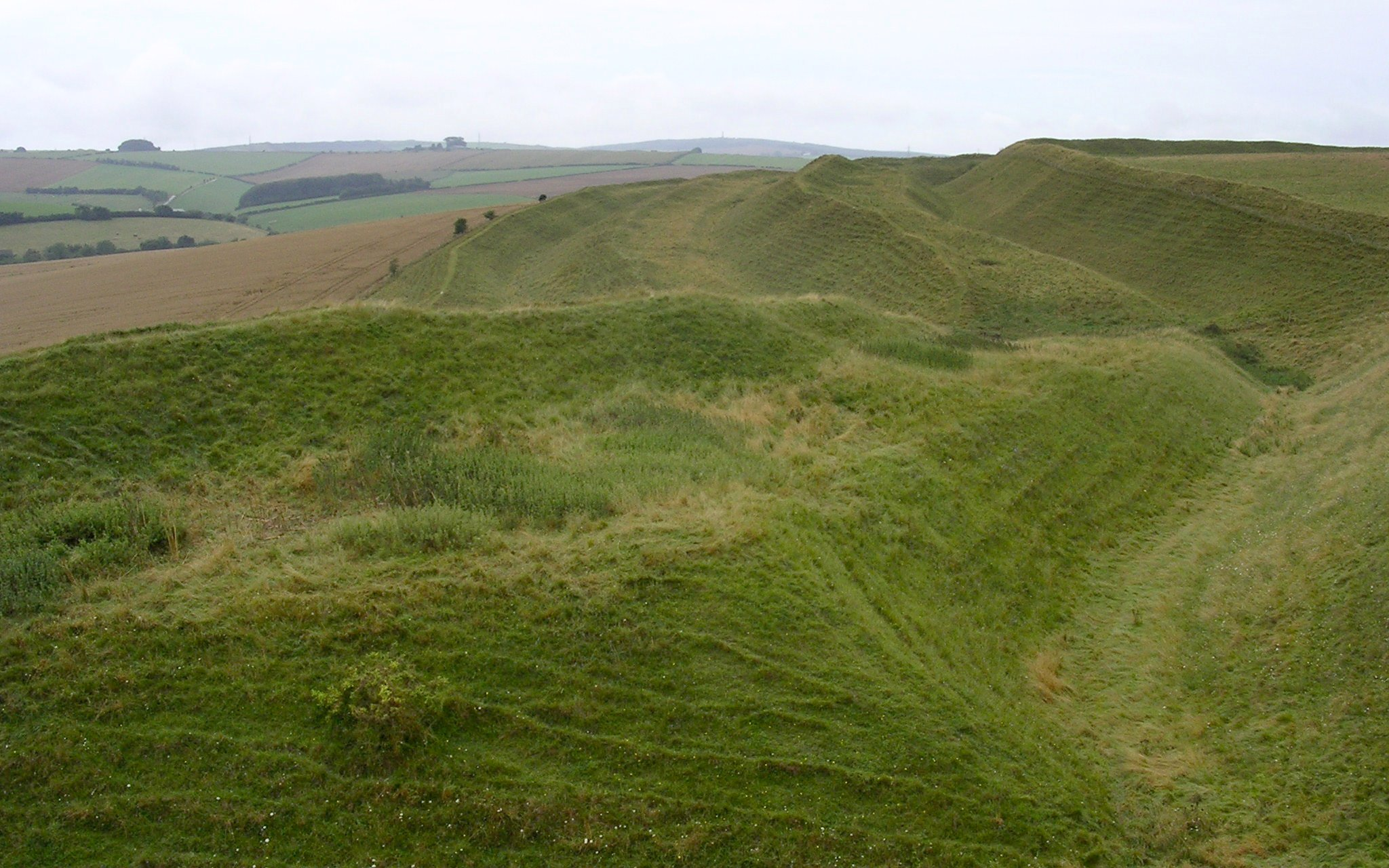
Maiden Castle's southern defences were made up of four ramparts and three ditches.

In the Early Iron Age, Maiden Castle was generally unexceptional; it was one of over 100 hill forts of similar size built around the same time in the area that is now Berkshire, Dorset, Hampshire, and Wiltshire. In the Middle Iron Age, Maiden Castle was expanded and in the process it became the largest hill fort in Britain and one of the largest in Europe. According to archaeologist Niall Sharples it is, by some definitions, the largest in western Europe. In about 450 BC, Maiden Castle was expanded from 6.4 to 19 ha (16 to 47 acres). The area was initially enclosed by a single bank and ditch, with the bank standing 2.7 m (8.9 ft) high although the ditch was shallow. The hill fort's expansion was not unique; it was one of a series of "developed hill forts" in southern England.

As some hill forts were expanded, many of the smaller hill forts that had proliferated in the Early Iron Age fell out of use, as was the case in Dorset. The developed hill forts in Dorset were spaced widely apart. This, and the abandonment of the smaller hill forts in the area when the developed hill forts were built, indicates that these developed hill forts were important. The developed hill forts of Berkshire, Dorset, Hampshire, and Wiltshire were equally spaced apart, with roughly equal access to resources such as water.

The emergence of developed hill forts has been attributed to Iron Age society becoming more complex. The emergence of one dominant hill fort in an area indicates that the inhabitants of a particular hill fort became more important than their contemporaries, possibly through warfare. However, a general dearth of evidence for destruction and an increase of artefacts associated with crafts and industry suggest that the reason for change was economic. Hill forts may have become important as centres of trade. This is supported by the possibility that the multiple rings of ditches often employed at developed hill forts (the technical term for which is "multivallate") were likely to be not just defensive; so many ditches and ramparts, such as those at Maiden Castle, were excessive for defence alone so were likely used as statements of power and authority. Developed hill forts were generally densely occupied; this is best demonstrated at Danebury, where 57% of the site has been excavated. While developed hill forts were of a higher status than their smaller predecessors, they were not all equal. Cunliffe states that the Maiden Castle's monumental defences probably indicate that it was of higher status than other developed hill forts.

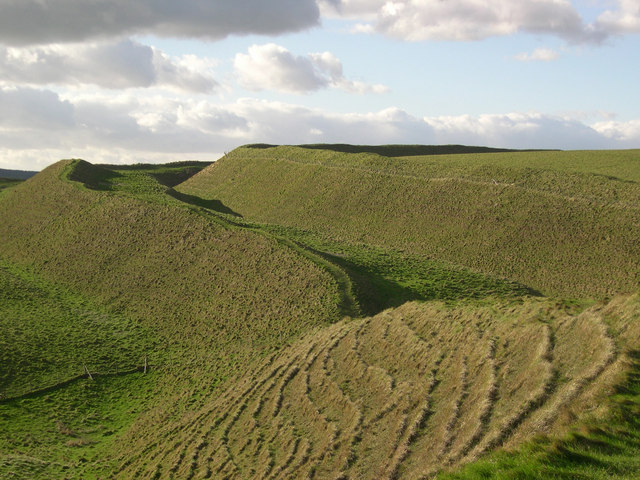
The ramparts and ditches of the developed hill fort

Maiden Castle expanded westwards, and the ditch was extended to enclose the neighbouring Hog Hill. The peaks of the two hills encompassed by the new, larger hill fort were separated by a dry valley. A shaft dug into the valley was possibly used as a water source. Almost immediately after the single ditch enclosure was expanded to 19 ha (47 acres), work began on making the defences more elaborate. The existing rampart was heightened to 3.5 m (11 ft), and more ramparts and ditches were added. On the south of the fort, four ramparts and three ditches were added, but because of the steepness of the northern slope of the hill, the fourth rampart did not extend all the way round, and only three ramparts were built on the northern side. At the same time, the eastern entrance was again made more complex through the addition of further earthworks, lengthening the approach to the site.

The four-post structures common in hill forts throughout England are also found in Maiden Castle. Their purpose on this site is uncertain however, since at 2 m (6.6 ft) square they have been considered by archaeologists to be too small for dwellings; as a result, it has been concluded that these structures were probably granaries. The presence of granaries suggests that the fort was used to control the area's food supply. Little evidence has been discovered for houses in Maiden Castle during the site's reconstruction in the 5th century BC; this is probably because the site has not been fully excavated and a quarry used to provide material for the rampart may have obliterated the evidence. It appears that houses were not built near the ramparts until after the defences were complete. Maiden Castle was occupied throughout the Iron Age and its inhabitants lived in roundhouses. The later houses appear to be organised in rows, and to be roughly similar in size, a reorganisation which indicates the increasing power of the elites over Iron Age society.

Bronze objects such as pins, jewellery, and rivets have been found on the site, dating from the Middle Iron Age. As there was no local source of tin and copper ore, this demonstrates long distance trade, probably with the southwest. Although bronze was not produced at Maiden Castle, there is evidence of it being reworked. Good quality iron ore could be found in the surrounding area, but the hill fort does not appear to have been a centre for iron production in this period; this is not unusual as very few hill forts in Berkshire, Dorset, Hampshire, and Wiltshire exhibit traces of iron production. Early in the Iron Age, most of the pottery found at Maiden Castle was produced locally – within about 15 km (9.3 mi) – however later on sources further afield became more important, and by the Late Iron Age 95% of the pottery came from the area around Poole Harbour, more than 35 mi (56 km) away. This long-range trade has been taken as evidence for increasing relationships with groups of people over large areas and the emergence of tribal identities. Although Sharples states that developed hill forts such as Maiden Castle are not towns and cannot be considered truly urban because they are so closely related to agriculture and storage, Cunliffe and fellow archaeologists Mark Corney and Andrew Payne describe developed hill forts as "town-like settlements", a form of proto-urbanism.

== Decline ==
Across Britain, many hill forts fell out of use in the 100 years around the turn of the millennium. It has been suggested that this, and the contemporary change in material culture of the Britons (such as the introduction of coinage and cemeteries and an increase in craft industries), was caused by increased interaction with the Roman Empire. The developing industries may have resulted in a shift away from the hill fort elites, whose power was based on agriculture. Such change is not as obvious in Dorset as it is in the rest of Britain, but there is a trend for abandonment of hill forts in the area and a proliferation of small undefended farmsteads, indicating a migration of the population.

Around 100 BC, Maiden Castle's organised street pattern was replaced by more random habitation. At the same time, the western half of the site was abandoned and occupation was concentrated in the east of the fort. Also during the Late Iron Age, some of the earthworks around the eastern gateway were filled in and settlement expanded beyond the entrance, and into the areas between the banks. Excavations by archaeologist Mortimer Wheeler in this area revealed several houses, storage pits, an area used for iron working, and a cemetery. On the industrial site, more than 62 kg (137 lb) of iron slag was discovered in an area of 30 m^{2} (320 sq ft), and it is believed the site produced around 200 kg (440 lb) of iron. The amount of ore required could not have been supplied by local sources, so most likely originated from areas of specialist iron production such as the Weald, south west England, and Wales. Maiden Castle is one of the most important iron production sites from the Late Iron Age in southern Britain.

There is little evidence for burial in the Iron Age until late on in the period, and it is believed that the prevalent method of disposing of a body was by excarnation. Wheeler's excavations on the cemetery in the eastern gateway revealed 52 burials, but only part of the cemetery was investigated, so the total number of burials is likely to be at least double this figure. One area of the cemetery featured burials of 14 people who had died in violent circumstances, including one body with a Roman catapult bolt in its back. Wheeler used the "war cemetery", as he described it, as evidence of a Roman attack on Maiden Castle.

== Roman activity and abandonment ==
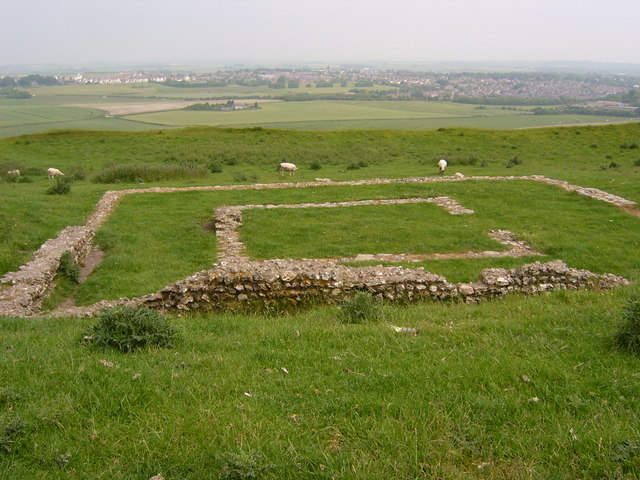
Site of the Roman temple at Maiden Castle

In AD 43, the Roman conquest of Britain began. Vespasian's subsequent campaign to conquer the tribes of the Atrebates, Dumnonii, and Durotriges in the southwest of Britain took place in AD 43–47. Based on the discovery of a group of bodies in the Late Iron Age formal cemetery that had met a violent death, archaeologist Mortimer Wheeler created a vivid story of the fall of Maiden Castle to Roman forces. He believed a legion wreaked destruction on the site, butchering men, women, and children, before setting fire to the site and slighting its defences. However, there is little archaeological evidence to support this version of events, or even that the hill fort was attacked by the Romans, Wheeler's interpretation of a siege and subsequent massacre being unlikely. Although there is a layer of charcoal, it is associated with the iron works, and the main evidence for slighting of defences comes from the collapse of an entranceway to the fort. Although 14 bodies in the cemetery exhibited signs of a violent death, there is no evidence that they died at Maiden Castle.

The eastern part of the hill fort remained in use for at least the first few decades of the Roman occupation, although the duration and nature of habitation is uncertain. Many 1st-century Roman artefacts have been discovered near the east entrance and in the centre of the hill fort. It has been suggested that Maiden Castle was occupied as a Roman military outpost or fort and the settlement discontinued, as there is no known fort in the area and it was not uncommon for hill forts in the southwest to have been occupied by Roman forces. This was a characteristic of Vespasian's campaign in the region; there was military occupation at Cadbury Castle in Somerset, Hembury in Devon, and Hod Hill in Dorset. A full geophysical survey of the hillfort conducted in 2015 by Dave Stewart has, however, produced no evidence for a Roman fort here.

Maiden Castle had been abandoned by the end of the 1st century, a time when Durnovaria (Dorchester) rose to prominence as the civitas, or regional capital, of the Durotriges, a Celtic tribe whose territory was in southwest England. However, in July 2015 archaeologists from Bournemouth University discovered the remains of the Iron Age settlement of Duropolis and believe that the abandonment of the fort may be connected with the new site. According to the ancient geographer Ptolemy, writing in the 2nd century AD, Dunium was the main settlement of the Durotriges. Although Dunium has long been thought to refer to Maiden Castle, Hod Hill and Hengistbury have been identified as two other possible sites for Dunium. Dunium may have derived from British duno- which meant "a fort".

Sometime after 367, a Romano-Celtic temple was built at Maiden Castle in the eastern half of the hill fort. The date was deduced from a hoard of coins discovered beneath a mosaic floor in the temple. A central room, measuring 6 m (20 ft) square, was surrounded by a 3 m (9.8 ft) passageway, similar to many Romano-Celtic temples found in the south of England. Nearby were two other buildings: a rectangular building 7.9 m × 5.5 m (26 ft × 18 ft) with two rooms that may have been a house for a priest, and a circular building that may have been a shrine. At the same time as the temple was built, the fort's eastern gateway was refurbished; there was possibly another shrine inside the gateway.

== Later history ==
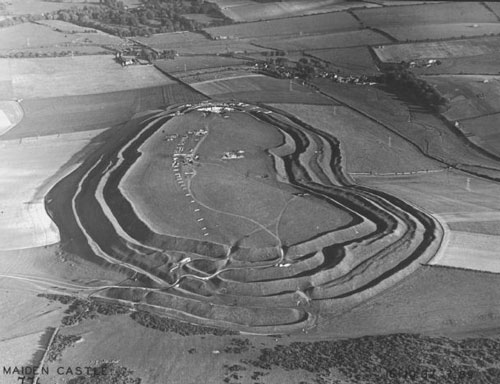
Excavations at Maiden Castle in October 1937. Photograph by Major George Allen (1891–1940).

The 4th-century temple gradually fell into disuse and Maiden Castle was used predominantly as pasture. There is evidence for activity on the site in the form of a few post-Roman or Anglo Saxon burials, some possibly Christian, but the hill fort was not reused as a settlement. In the 16th and 17th centuries, a barn was built over the "war cemetery". The only other significant activity on the hill top after the Romans was a short period of cultivation in the 17th century, as demonstrated by traces of ridge and furrow caused by ploughing.

The modern name for the hill fort is first recorded in 1607 as Mayden Castell; it is not unique to the site and occurs in several other places in Britain and is widely taken to mean a "fortification that looks impregnable" or one that has never been taken in battle. Alternatively, the name may derive from the Brittonic mai-dun, meaning a "great hill". A more recent explanation has been advanced by Richard Coates suggesting that the name is only of medieval origin, and was applied simultaneously to the considerable number of identically named locations around the country.

Over the following centuries, the site was abandoned completely and became open pasture, although it was of interest to antiquarians. Thomas Hardy, who built his house within sight of it, described the castle in a short story, "Ancient Earthworks and What Two Enthusiastic Scientists Found Therein" (1885) about a local antiquarian who spent much time investigating the site. In 1921, composer John Ireland wrote Mai-Dun, a symphonic rhapsody, about the hill fort in Dorset. John Cowper Powys wrote a novel titled Maiden Castle in 1936, which was set in Dorset.

== Archaeological investigations ==
The first widespread investigation of hill forts was carried out in the second half of the 19th century under the direction of Augustus Pitt-Rivers, but it was not until the 1930s that Maiden Castle was methodically investigated, the first large-scale excavation of the interior of a hill fort. Between 1934 and 1937, Mortimer Wheeler and Tessa Verney Wheeler excavated both the interior and the defences, work that was funded almost entirely by donations from the public. Wheeler's use of the media to disseminate information about the site resulted in Maiden Castle becoming well known. It was one of about 80 hill forts to have been excavated by 1940, in a period known as "hill fort mania" during the 1920s and 1930s.

Between 1985 and 1986 further excavations under Niall Sharples were prompted by the hill fort's deteriorating condition, partly caused by the large number of visitors to the site. Under the auspices of English Heritage, repair work and archaeological investigations were undertaken concurrently. Techniques such as radiocarbon dating were available to Sharples that were unavailable to Wheeler, allowing the site to be dated. The structure was made a Scheduled Monument in 1981, giving Maiden Castle protection against unauthorised change; it is now maintained by English Heritage. With parking facilities and information boards for visitors, Maiden Castle is open to the public all year round. Today, the site is in the civil parish of Winterborne Monkton at grid reference SY66938848.

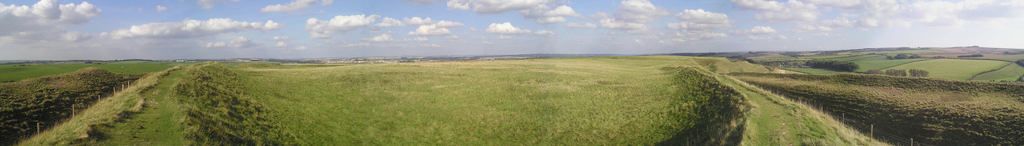
Panorama of the interior of Maiden Castle

== Cultural references ==
English poet and novelist Thomas Hardy (1840–1928) wrote in his novel The Mayor of Casterbridge (1886), about the affair between Donald Farfrae and the novel's heroine, Elizabeth-Jane, at the hillfort whilst, in the 1967 movie version of Hardy's 1874 novel Far From the Madding Crowd, the ramparts memorably formed the place where the dashing Sergeant Francis "Frank" Troy (played by Terence Stamp) displayed his swordsmanship to Bathsheba Everdene (played by Julie Christie). Hardy's short story from 1893 'A Tryst at an Ancient Earthwork' is centred upon an illicit night time excavation within the Roman temple of Maiden Castle.

In 1921, the English composer John Ireland (1879–1962) wrote the tone poem Mai-Dun, A Symphonic Rhapsody about the place, adopting Hardy's name for it. In 1931, Ireland arranged his piece for piano four hands.

== See also ==
- Hillforts in Britain
- List of hill forts in England
