= Fosse Way =

Roman road built in Britain around the 1st and 2nd centuries AD

- Roman Road
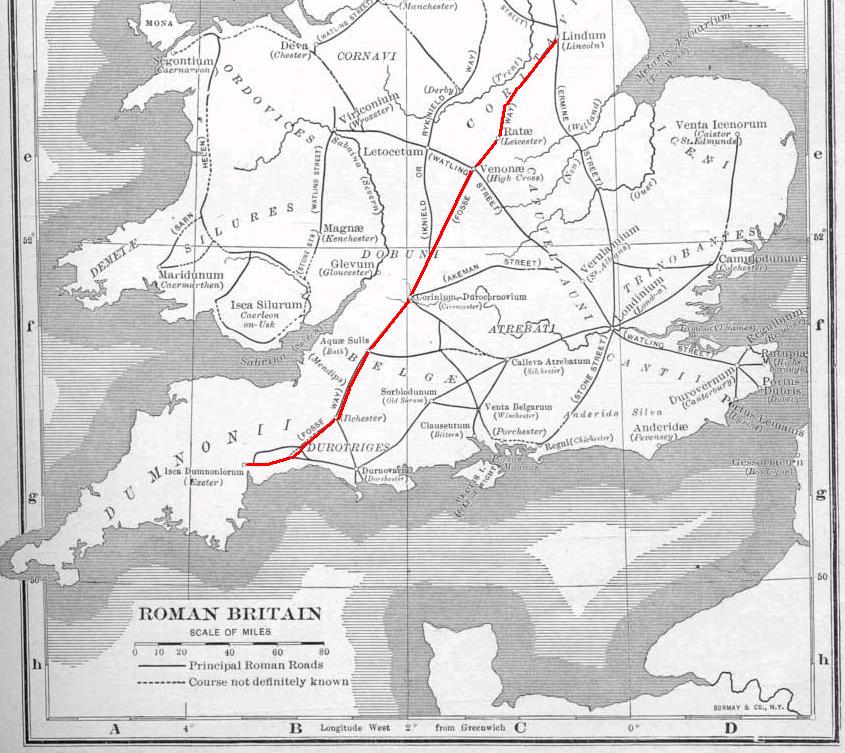
- The route of the Fosse Way

Route information
- Length: 230 mi (370 km)
- Time period: Roman Britain
- Margary number: 5

Major junctions
- From: Isca Dumnoniorum
- Lindinis, Aquae Sulis, Corinium, Venonis, Ratae Corieltauvorum
- To: Lindum Colonia

Location
- Country: United Kingdom

Road network
- Roman roads in Britannia

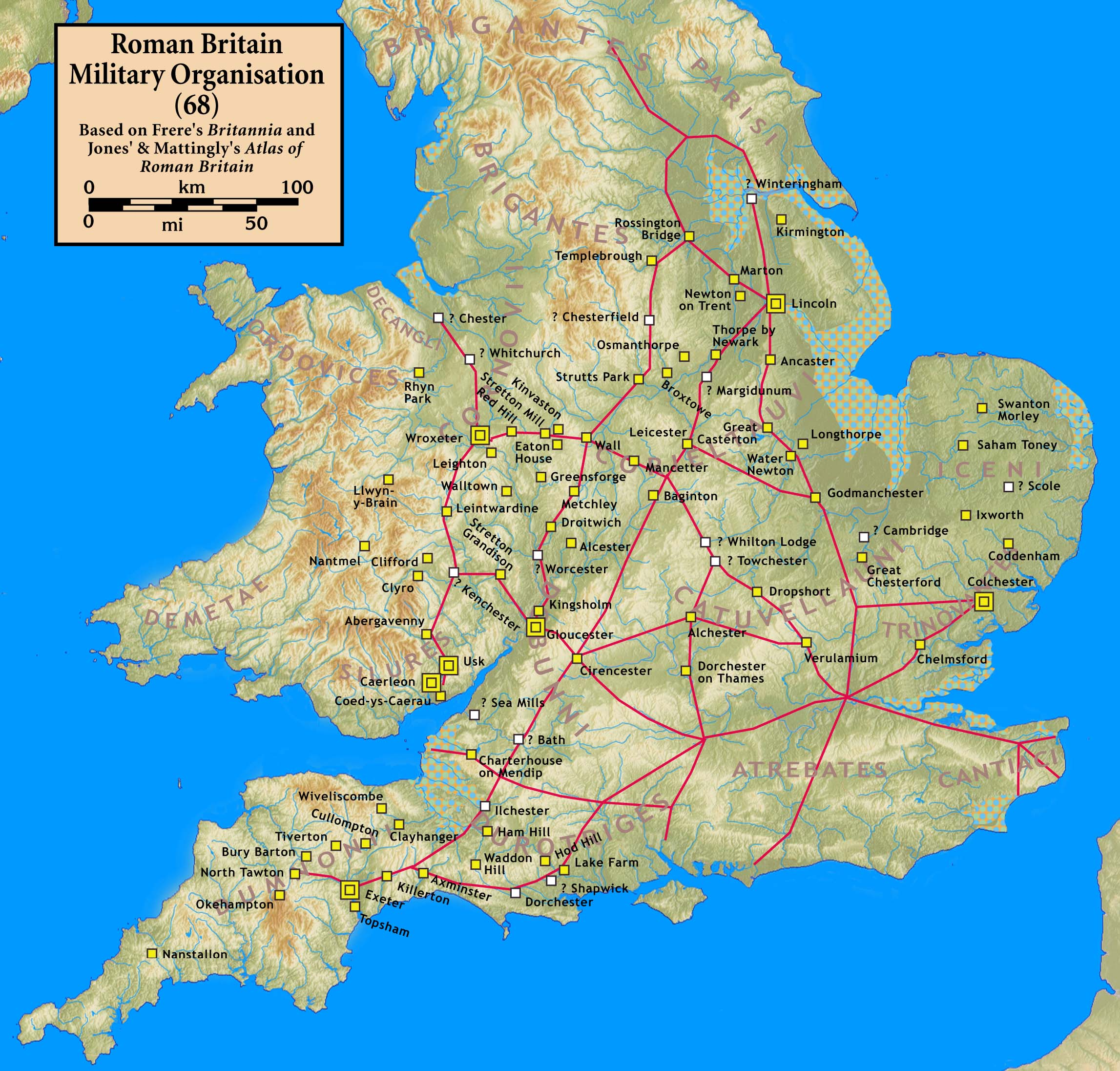
Roman Britain military infrastructure 68 AD

The Fosse Way was a Roman road built in Britain during the first and second centuries AD that linked Isca Dumnoniorum (Exeter) in the southwest and Lindum Colonia (Lincoln) to the northeast, via Lindinis (Ilchester), Aquae Sulis (Bath), Corinium (Cirencester), and Ratae Corieltauvorum (Leicester). Much of its route is still used by modern roads, lanes and byways.

== Toponymy ==
The word Fosse is derived from the Latin fossa, meaning 'ditch'. For the first few decades after the Roman invasion of Britain in 43 AD, the Fosse Way marked the western frontier of Roman rule in Iron Age Britain. It is possible that the road began as a defensive ditch that was later filled in and converted into a road, or perhaps a defensive ditch ran alongside the road for at least some of its length.

== Route ==
The road joined Akeman Street and Ermin Way at Cirencester, crossed Watling Street at Venonis (High Cross) south of Leicester, and joined Ermine Street at Lincoln.

The Antonine Itinerary (a 2nd-century Roman register of roads) includes the section between High Cross and Lincoln, and lists intermediate points at Verometo (Willoughby on the Wolds), Margiduno (Castle Hill near Bingham), Ad Pontem (East Stoke) and Crocolana (Brough).

From Lincoln to Ilchester in Somerset, a distance of 182 miles (293 km), the route never deviates more than 6 miles (10 km) from a straight line.

== Preservation ==
Many sections of the Fosse Way form parts of modern roads and lanes, and parish, district or county boundaries, but some parts are now only accessible on foot.

Several placenames on the route have the suffix -cester or -chester, which is derived from Old English ceaster / cæster (ultimately from Latin castra meaning 'military camp'). Some settlements are named after the road itself, such as Fosse-, or -on-Fosse, while others have a more generic form, such as Street, Strete, -le-Street, Stratton, Stretton, Stratford, and Stretford, derived from Old English strǣt / strēt (ultimately from Latin strata, meaning 'paved road').

== Route ==
The route runs from 50.73°N 3.48°W in Exeter to 53.23°N 0.54°W in Lincoln.

=== Lincoln to Leicester ===
Between Lincoln and Leicester the A46 follows the route of the Fosse Way. The A46 deviates at East Goscote, to follow the Leicester Western Bypass. The original alignment, which is still visible as an unclassified road called Fosse Way, passes north west of Syston, continuing as the minor road Melton Road through Thurmaston, before merging with the A607 (the old A46) and continuing into the city centre on the old alignment, first as Melton Road, then Belgrave Road and Belgrave Gate.

The alignment terminates at the Clock Tower, and picks up again at Narborough Road (the A5460), on the other side of the River Soar. A 19-mile (31 km) stretch of the road between Widmerpool and Newark-on-Trent has been upgraded to a dual carriageway which was completed in 2012. The new route deviates in several sections from the historic road line.

=== Leicester to Cirencester ===
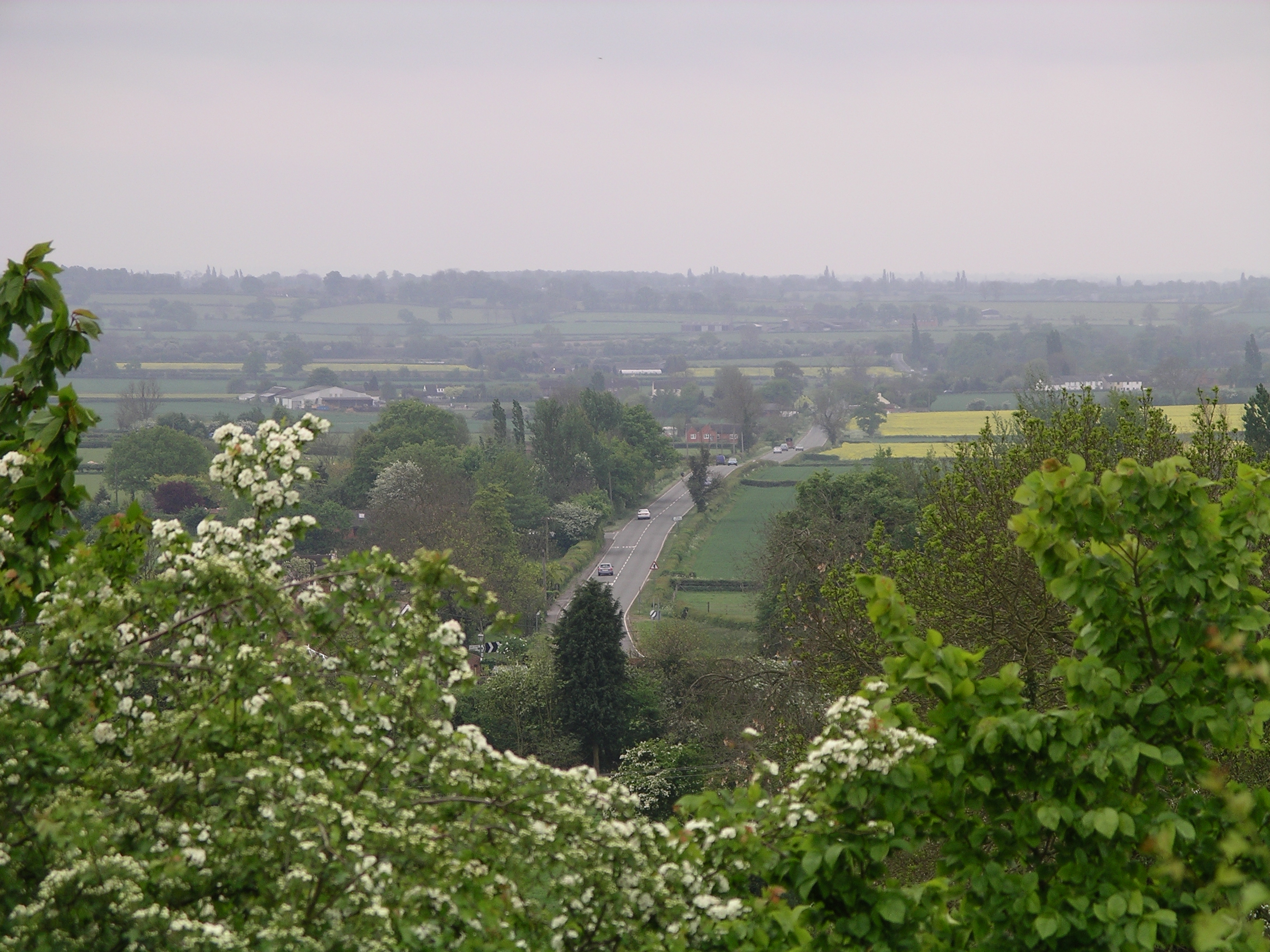
Fosse Way from the top of Brinklow Castle, Warwickshire

South of Leicester, the B4114 (originally the A46 but renumbered when the M69 was opened) follows the route, apart from a short deviation near Narborough, where the original course is no longer visible. A short distance north of the A5, the B4114 diverges from the line of the Fosse Way to pass through the village of Sharnford.

For 2 miles (3.2 km) the route of the Fosse Way is followed by a minor road named Roman Road which, although single track, runs along a much wider and slightly domed strip of land with deep ditches either side (the agger). The modern road ends at a picnic site car park, and a further 1.5 miles (2.4 km) southwards can be explored on foot.

The junction of Fosse Way with Watling Street, now the A5, is at High Cross (Roman name Venonis). Watling Street is the county boundary between Leicestershire and Warwickshire.

The Fosse Way follows the B4455 across Warwickshire, through Street Ashton, Stretton-under-Fosse, Brinklow, Bretford, Stretton-on-Dunsmore, Princethorpe and the site of a Roman town near Chesterton, until it joins the A429 near the boundary with Gloucestershire. The route then follows the A429 through Stretton-on-Fosse, Moreton-in-Marsh, Stow-on-the-Wold, Northleach and Fossebridge, to Cirencester, where it crosses Akeman Street and Ermin Way.

=== Cirencester to Bath ===
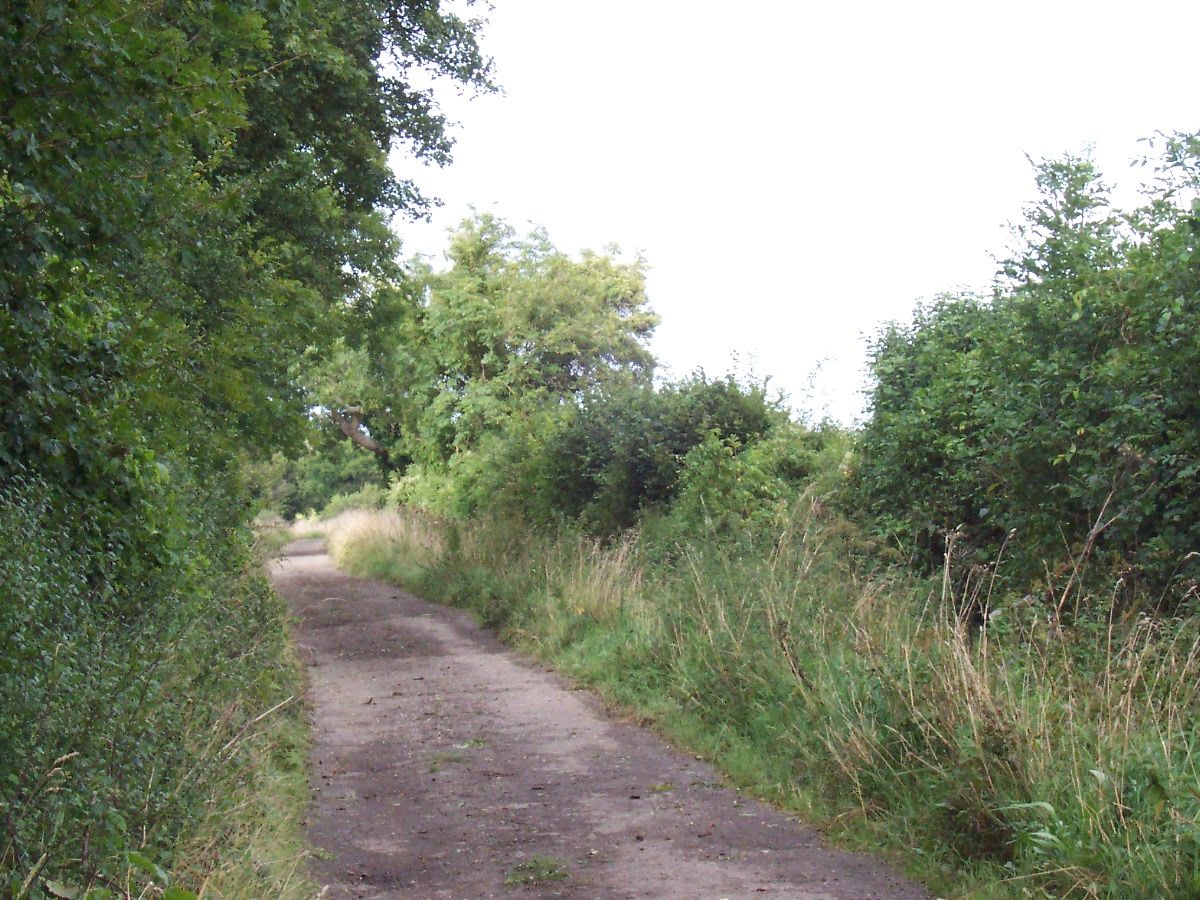
A section of the Fosse Way as a byway north of the M4

South of Cirencester the Fosse Way follows a short section of the A433, then goes cross country. The route crosses the River Thames and under the first South Wales railway – the Golden Valley line – which was constructed via Gloucester. The road continues, later forming the county boundary between Gloucestershire and Wiltshire, across Cotswold Airport near Kemble, then becomes fragmented sections of country lanes; two sections on this stretch are byways rather than maintained roads, and at points on these routes it widens to as much as 60 feet (20 m).

It passes near the Iron Age hillfort called Bury Camp and becomes another section of the county boundary, crossing the second South Wales railway – the South Wales Main Line – next the site of an old chapel and spring at Fosse Lodge in Dunley, and then crossing the M4. Thereafter it passes through The Shoe and Nettleton Shrub where remains of a posting-station have been found, and arrives at Batheaston, where it turns due west to follow the River Avon into Bath.

=== Bath to Ilchester ===
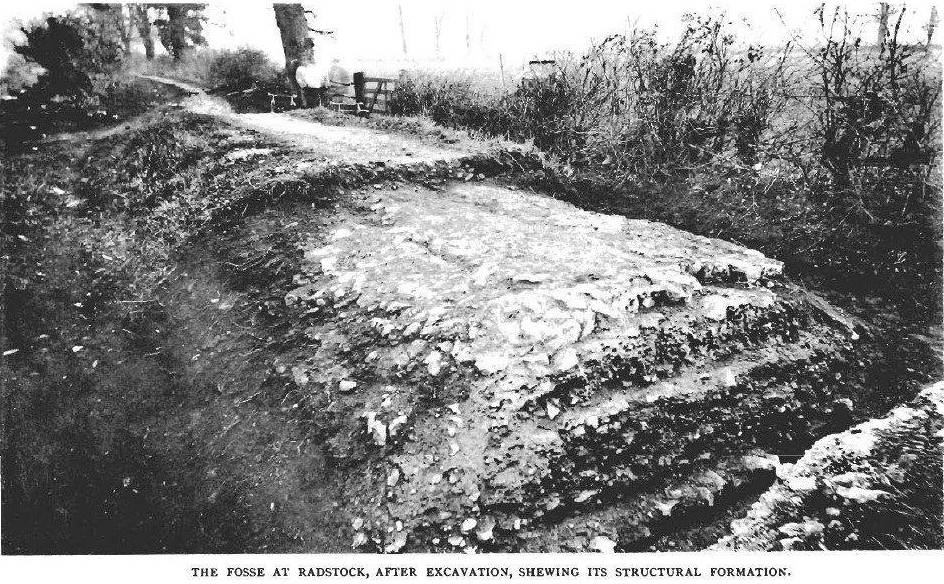
Excavated segment of the Fosse Way at Radstock, showing its construction in cross-section

Between Bath and Shepton Mallet the line of the Fosse Way follows parts of the A367, through Clandown, Radstock, Westfield and Stratton-on-the-Fosse. It runs across open country and farm tracks parallel to the A37 north of Shepton Mallet, near the Iron Age hillfort of Maesbury. At Beacon Hill, south of Oakhill, it crossed the Roman road along the Mendip ridgeway from Old Sarum to the lead and silver mines at Charterhouse. The Fosse Way passes through the eastern suburbs of Shepton Mallet on a short stretch of the A361 to Cannard's Grave, where its route becomes the A37.

The Fosse Way follows the A37 through Street-on-the-Fosse and Lydford-on-Fosse on a direct route to Ilchester. The route leaves the A37 north of the A303 junction just north of Ilchester, and follows a track (previously part of the A37 from before the by-pass opened and broken by the present-day A372 and A303), before picking up the B3151 through the town. It leaves the B3151 onto Ilchester's High Street, then follows West Street and Roman Road, a minor road that was formerly part of the A303, towards the present-day A303 west of town.

The Roman road from Ilchester to Dorchester, Dorset continues on the line of A37 through Yeovil to the south east. Other minor Roman roads lead from Ilchester and Lydford-on-Fosse towards Street and the A39 route along the Polden Hills, leading to Roman salt works on the Somerset Levels, and ports at Combwich, Crandon Bridge and Highbridge.

=== Ilchester to Exeter ===
After Ilchester the Fosse Way is followed by a section of the A303 under the ramparts of the Iron Age hillfort of Ham Hill, occupied by the Second Legion after the conquest of the Durotriges in Dorset.

The alignment leaves major roads after Petherton Bridge over the River Parrett, and follows country lanes to Over Stratton and Dinnington, where in 2002 members of the Channel 4 television programme Time Team uncovered a mosaic next to the road.

The route crosses a stream called Stretford Water, climbs the ridge, and follows a short section of the A30 at Windwhistle Hill. Then it turns on to the B3167 through the hamlets of Street and Perry Street, joins the A358, crosses the River Axe at what used to be called Stratford (now Weycroft), and on to Axminster.

The location of the end of the Fosse Way is uncertain. There are further alignments on the A358 at Ball's Farm and Musbury south of Axminster, which imply a Roman road continued along the Axe toward Axmouth and Seaton. These sections are labelled Fosse Way on Ordnance Survey maps.

The crossroads in Axminster was controlled by a Roman fort at Woodbury Farm, now on the southern edge of the town. The route to the west crosses the Rivers Axe and Yarty to Kilmington, continuing on segments of the A35 and local lanes to Honiton. From Honiton the route leads south-west along the old A30, to Strete Ralegh, where there is a short break, then a clear alignment along the former A30, now a minor road, towards Exeter.

== See also ==
- Roman Britain
- Roman roads in Britannia
- List of crossings of the River Thames
- Fosseway Bitter
