= Isca Dumnoniorum =

Roman legionary fortress in Devon, England

Coordinates: 50.722°N 3.534°W

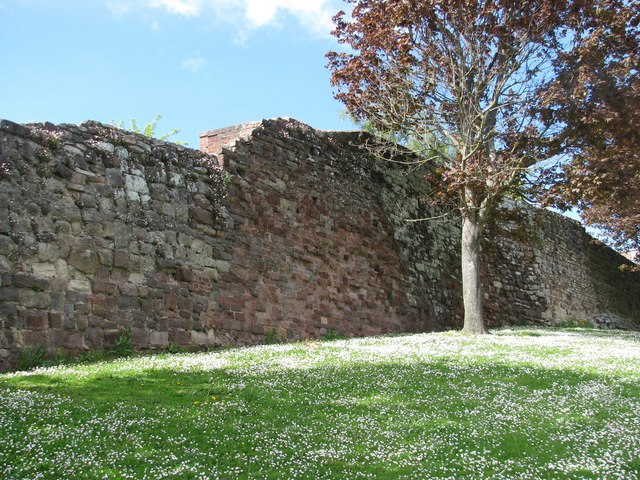
City walls, Exeter. Some of the stonework is medieval.

Isca Dumnoniorum, also known simply as Isca, was originally a Roman legionary fortress for the Second Augustan Legion (established c. AD 55) in the Roman province of Britannia at the site of present-day Exeter in Devon.

The town grew up around this fortress and served as the tribal capital of the Dumnonians under and after the Romans. The city walls of Exeter (some 70% of which survive) mark the former perimeter of Isca.

== Name ==
The name Isca Dumnoniorum is a Latinization of a native Brittonic name describing flowing water, in reference to the River Exe. More exactly, the name seems to have originally meant "full of fish" (cf. Welsh pysg, pl. "fish"), although it came to be a simple synonym for water (cf. Scottish whisky). This is also reflected in the modern Welsh name for Exeter: Caerwysg meaning "fortified settlement on the river Uisc". The same name was used for the River Usk (modern Welsh: Afon Wysg) in southern Wales, causing the settlement there (modern Caerleon) to be distinguished as Isca Augusta, while the Devonian Isca was called Isca Dumnoniorum: Usk of the Dumnonians.

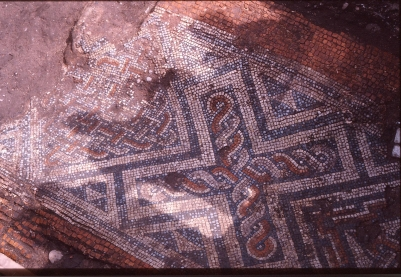
A Roman mosaic floor discovered under the ruins of St Catherine's Chapel and Almshouses. It is now on display at Exeter's Royal Albert Memorial Museum.

== History ==
=== Prehistoric ===
Exeter began as settlements on a dry ridge ending in a spur overlooking a navigable river teeming with fish, with fertile land nearby. Although there have been no major prehistoric finds, these advantages suggest the site was occupied early. Coins had been discovered from the Hellenistic kingdoms, suggesting the existence of a settlement trading with the Mediterranean as early as 250 BC. This is disputed however by Prof T P Wiseman who alleges the hoard was not genuine.

=== Roman ===
Fortress

Following their initial invasions, the Romans established a 42-acre (17 ha) 'playing-card' shaped fort (Latin: castrum) at the site around AD 55. It was the base of the 5 000-strong Second Augustan Legion (Legio II Augusta) for the next 20 years before they moved to Isca Augusta (modern Caerleon in Wales). Both Iscas were also home to their families as settlements are thought to have grown up outside the fortress gates, especially to the north-east.

Buildings within the fortress, such as barracks, granaries, and workshop (fabrica), were timber structures, the post-trenches of which were excavated in the 1970s in advance of the Guildhall shopping centre development. The only known building in the fortress not of timber was a stone-built military bathhouse. The water for the bathhouse was supplied by a natural spring via an aqueduct which entered the fortress through the rear gate (porta decumana). The excavations revealed the hot room (caldarium) and part of the warm room (tepidarium). The bathhouse was also supplied with an external exercise yard (palaestra), one corner of which was a cockfighting pit.

The legion had formed part of the Claudian invasion of Britain in AD 43, under the command of the future emperor Vespasian. Vespasian led campaigns against both the Durotriges and Dumnonii. The presence of the legion at Exeter is supported by the discovery of a dolphin antefix (roof fitting) from levels within the military bathhouse dated to about AD 60. The antefix appears to have been created from the same mould as an example from the legionary fortress at Caerleon—where the legion is known to have been stationed from around AD 75. (The legion had previously suffered a defeat to the Silures of southern Wales in the year 52.) The legions of Britain were rearranged after Suetonius Paulinus's victory against the Boudiccan rebellion.

There was a small subsidiary fort at Topsham. A supply depot along the line between the Isca fortress and Topsham was excavated at the former St Loyes college site on Topsham Road in 2010. Initial dating suggests that it was occupied at the same time as the Isca fortress, c. 55–75. Another Roman fort was discovered in 2019 under the coach station near Bampfylde Street.

Settlement

Next to these [the Durotriges], but more to the west, are the Dumnoni, whose towns are:
Voliba 14°45 52°00
Uxella 15°00 52°45
Tamara 15°00 52°15
Isca, where is located Legio II Augusta 17°30 52°45.

—Ptolemy, Geography, II.ii.

The settlement (canabae) of Isca Dumnoniorum seems to have developed around the Roman fortress. It is one of the four cities (poleis) attributed to the Dumnonii by Claudius Ptolemy in his 2nd-century Geography and it served as the tribal capital (civitas) of the Dumnonii. It was also listed on the late-2nd century Antonine Itinerary, where it forms the southern terminus of route 15 (Iter XV) on the Fosse Way, and on the 7th-century Ravenna Cosmography, where it appears as the apparently confused entry of Scadu Namorum.

The fortress was given up around AD 75 and shortly afterwards its grounds were converted to civilian purposes. The military baths were too large for the local population and were largely demolished, although parts were incorporated into the forum and basilica built on the site. A smaller bathhouse was then built to the southeast. In the late 2nd century, the ditch and rampart defences around the fortress were replaced by a bank and wall enclosing a much larger area, some 92 acres (37 ha). There is evidence of copper and bronze working. A possible stock-yard has also been identified and Isca was clearly a key market for livestock, crops, and pottery produced in the surrounding countryside. The importance of Isca as a trading centre is demonstrated by the discovery of more than a thousand Roman coins around the city. However, the dates of these coins suggest that the city was at its most prosperous in the first half of the 4th century; virtually no coins dated after AD 380 have been found, suggesting a rapid decline.

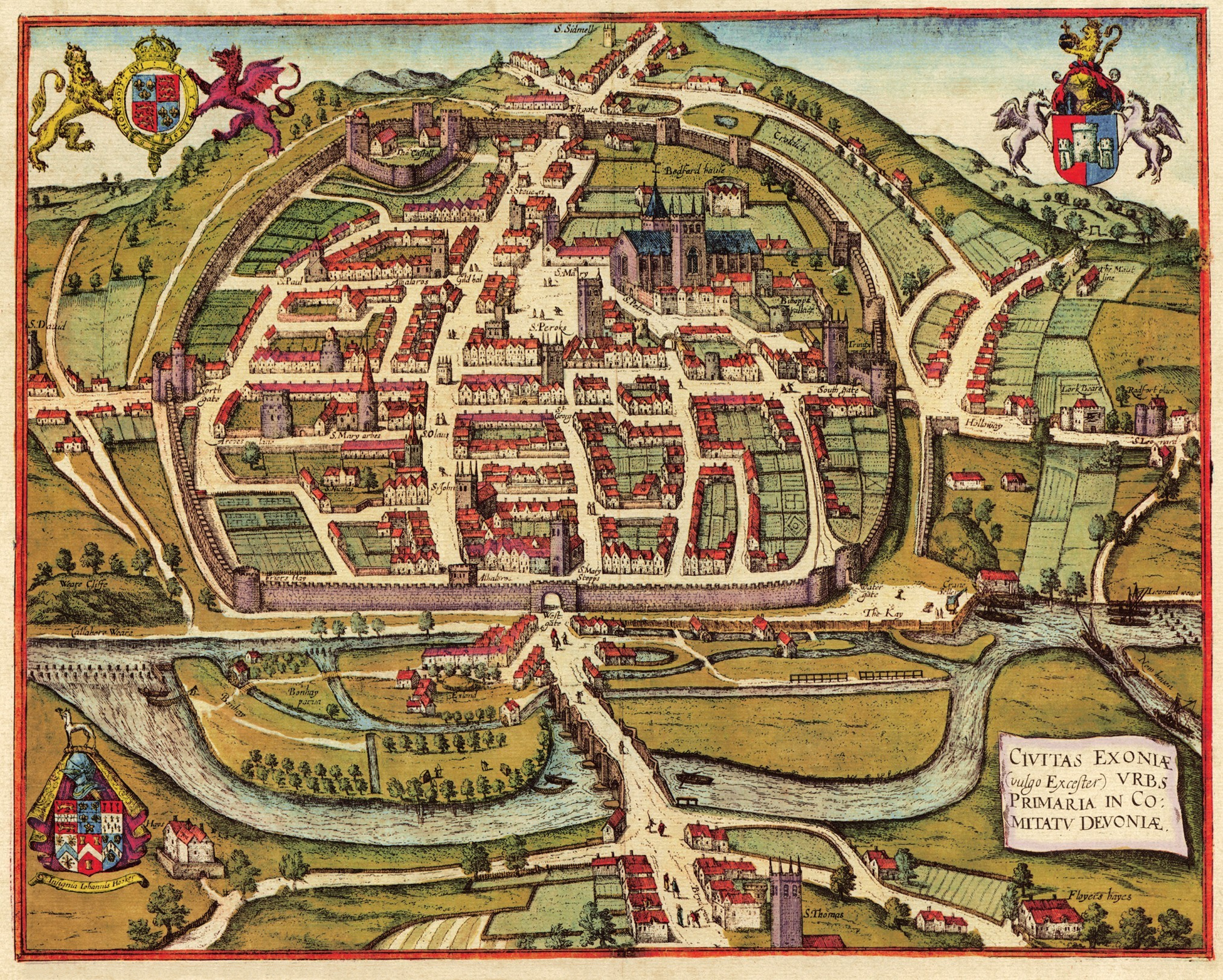
A map of Exeter in 1563, showing the city walls

=== Medieval ===
Bishop Ussher identified the Cair Pensa vel Coyt listed among the 28 cities of Britain by the History of the Britons as Isca, although Ford read it as a reference to Penselwood and thought it more likely to be Lindinis (modern Ilchester). Isca was also known to the British as Caer Uisc but, after the Roman withdrawal from Britain around 410, there is very little evidence of habitation in Exeter for almost 300 years except for the remains of a building (possibly a church) in the area of the demolished forum and a few nearby graves dated to the 5th, 6th, and 7th centuries. After this, the historical record picks up again around 680 with a document that reporting that St Boniface was educated at the abbey in Exeter.

== Remains ==
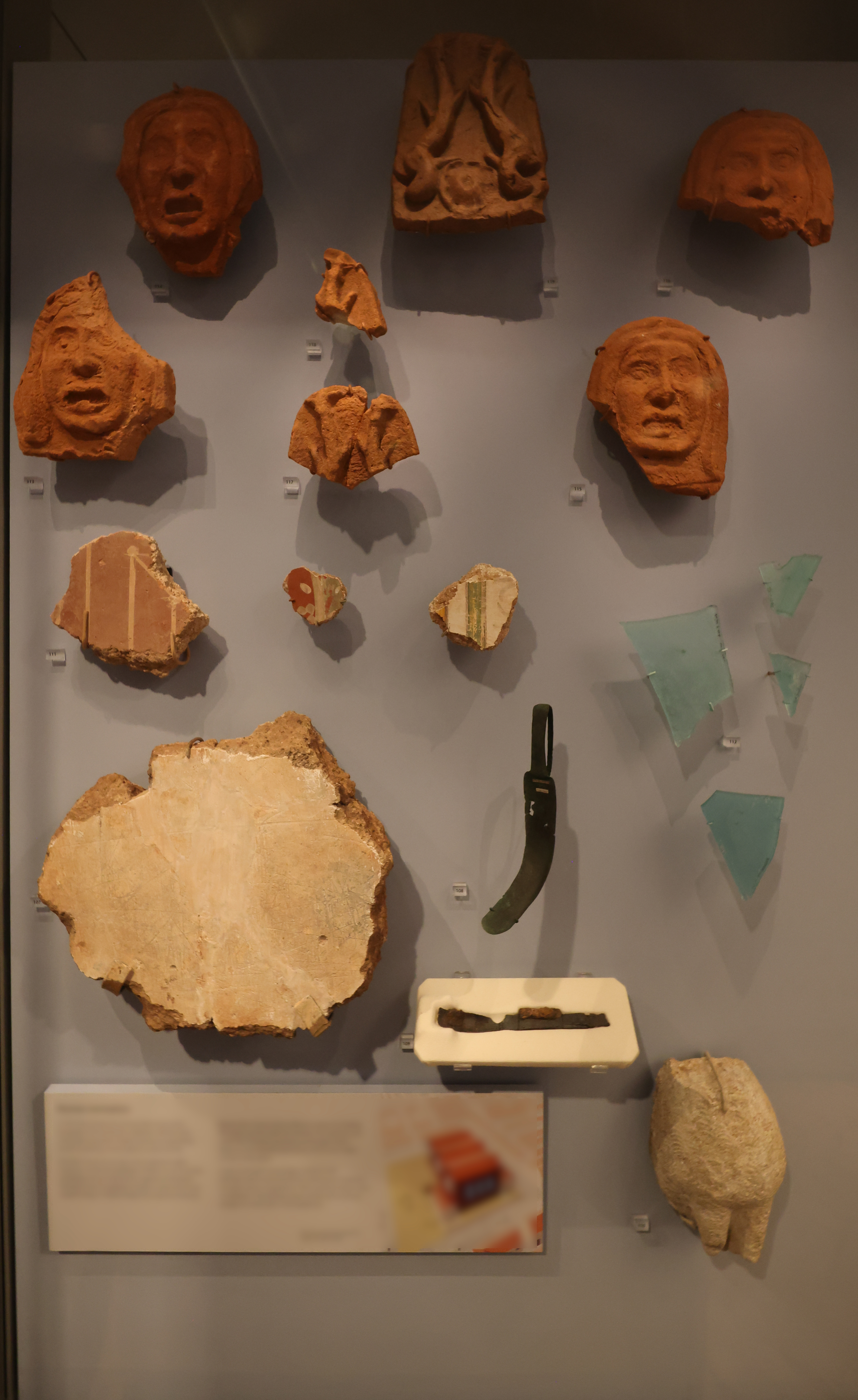
Some of the items from Isca Dumnoniorum at the Royal Albert Memorial Museum

Much of the Roman wall survives as the lower courses or inner core of the medieval city walls, 70% of which still exist, largely built on the orders of Alfred the Great to protect the far west of his kingdom following the Viking occupation of 876. The legionary bath complex was excavated in the 1970s, but because of its proximity to the cathedral it was not practicable to retain the excavation for public view. Artifacts from the excavation, however, are displayed with other discoveries at the city's Royal Albert Memorial Museum.

== See also ==
- Exeter, for the later history of the site

== Sources ==
- Bidwell, Paul T. (1980). Roman Exeter: Fortress and Town. Exeter City Council. ISBN 0-86114-270-5.
- Higham, Robert (2008). Making Anglo-Saxon Devon. Exeter: The Mint Press. ISBN 978-1-903356-57-9.
- Hoskins, W. G. (2004). Two Thousand Years in Exeter (Revised and updated ed.). Chichester: Phillimore. ISBN 1-86077-303-6.
