= Miles Russell =

British archaeologist (born 1967)

Dr Miles Russell FSA
- Born: Miles Anton Russell; 8 April 1967 (age 59); Brighton, Sussex, England
- Known for: Time Team; Duropolis; Piltdown hoax resolution

Academic background
- Education: UCL Institute of Archaeology; Bournemouth University

Academic work
- Discipline: Archaeology
- Sub-discipline: Prehistoric archaeology Roman archaeology
- Institutions: UCL Field Archaeology Unit; Oxford Archaeological Unit; Bournemouth University

Miles Russell, FSA (born 8 April 1967) is a British archaeologist best known for his work and publications on the prehistoric and Roman periods and for his appearances in television programmes such as Time Team and Harry Hill's TV Burp.

== Personal life ==
Russell was born and educated in Brighton and in 1993, moved to Bournemouth, where he has lectured at Bournemouth University and, since 2009, has worked on the Duropolis "Big Dig", part of the Durotriges Project, with co-directors Paul Cheetham and Harry Manley. He has written 15 books covering the Neolithic and Roman periods and has appeared numerous times on television, most notably in the Channel 4 television series Time Team alongside presenter Tony Robinson. He has also been a frequent contributor to Digging for Britain, presented by Dr Alice Roberts.

== Career ==
As a graduate of the Institute of Archaeology, University College London, he subsequently worked as a field officer for UCL's Field Archaeology Unit and a Project Manager for the Oxford Archaeological Unit. In 1993, he joined the staff of Bournemouth University, where he is a senior lecturer, subsequently conducting fieldwork on various projects across southern England, Wales, Scotland, the Isle of Man, Sicily, Germany and Russia. He obtained his PhD from Bournemouth University on the Neolithic monumental architecture of the South Downs in 2000 and became a Fellow of the Society of Antiquaries of London in 2006. He is director of Regnum: the First Kingdom and co-director of the Durotriges Project, both investigating the transition from the Iron Age to the Roman period as well as coordinating projects into Neolithic Flint Mines, Piltdown Man, The ‘Face’ of Roman Britain and the Lost voices of Celtic Britain.

Russell organised and chaired the session 'When Worlds Collide: Archaeology and Science Fiction' at the 1997 Theoretical Archaeology Group conference held at Bournemouth University. Author Douglas Adams, who had been invited to attend, wrote the preface to the book 'Digging Holes in Popular Culture' published by Oxbow Books in 2002, which was derived from the conference.

In 2003, Russell published the results of a three-year project investigating the Piltdown Man hoax, which strongly implied that the perpetrator of the fraud was the 'finder' Charles Dawson. In 2008, he co-directed excavations within Stonehenge with Professor Tim Darvill and Professor Geoffrey Wainwright. In 2013, Russell and colleague Harry Manley identified a fragment of a Roman statue, previously known as the "Bosham Head," as representing Emperor Trajan. Russell and Manley have also identified a damaged statue of the young emperor Nero from Fishbourne Roman Palace in West Sussex and have tentatively identified a Roman statue held at Petworth House representing Emperor Nero.

In 2017, Russell published the first results from the Lost Voices of Celtic Britain Project, reassessing the archaeological content of the 12th-century Historia Regum Britanniae by Geoffrey of Monmouth. A forensic examination of Geoffrey’s Historia Regum Britanniae has demonstrated the text was compiled from a variety of early British sources, including oral folklore, king-lists, dynastic tables and bardic praise poems, some of which date back to the first century BC. In deconstructing Geoffrey’s text, Russell has argued that the origins of King Arthur emerge as a composite ‘Celtic Superhero’ created by Geoffrey from five separate characters.

== Works ==
Books

- A Reassessment of the Bronze Age Cemetery-Barrow on Itford Hill and its place in the Prehistory of Southeast England. Bournemouth University (1996)
- Flint Mines in Neolithic Britain. Tempus (2000)
- The Neolithic Monumental Architecture of the South Downs. British Archaeological Reports (2001)
- Prehistoric Sussex. Tempus (2002)
- Digging Holes in Popular Culture: Archaeology and Science Fiction. Oxbow (2002)
- Piltdown Man: The Secret Life of Charles Dawson. Tempus (2003)
- Monuments of the British Neolithic: the Roots of Architecture. Tempus (2003)
- Rough Quarries Rocks and Hills: The Neolithic Flint Mines of Sussex. Oxbow (2004)
- Roman Sussex. Tempus (2006)
- Bloodline: The Celtic Kings of Roman Britain. Amberley (2010)
- UnRoman Britain: Exposing the Great Myth of Britannia. The History Press (2011; with Stuart Laycock)
- The Piltdown Man Hoax: Case Closed. The History Press (2012)
- Bignor Roman Villa. The History Press (2015; with David Rudling)
- Arthur and the Kings of Britain. Amberley (2017)
- Hillforts and the Durotriges: a Geophysical Survey of Iron Age Dorset. Archaeopress (2017; with Dave Stewart)

Articles

- Russell, M, Stewart, D, Cheetham, P, and Manley, H (2022) Artistic Lysons? New work on the ‘lost’ mosaics of Frampton Roman villa, Dorset. MOSAIC 49
- Russell, M (2022) Excavations at Wolstonbury Later Bronze Age hilltop enclosure. Sussex Archaeological Collections 158
- Russell, M and Manley, H (2022) Two portraits of Agrippa Postumus in the British Museum. Journal of Roman Archaeology 35
- Gerdau-Radonić, K, Sperrevik, J, Smith, M, Cheetham, P and Russell, M (2022) Deathways of the Durotriges: reconstructing identity through archaeothanatology in later Iron Age southern Britain. IN The Routledge Handbook of Archaeothanatology: Bioarchaeology of Mortuary Behaviour
- Russell, M, Cheetham, P, Stewart, D and John, D (2020) In the Footsteps of Vespasian: rethinking the Roman legionary fortress at Lake Farm, Wimborne Minster. Proceedings of the Dorset Natural History & Archaeological Society 141
- Stewart, D, Cheetham, P and Russell, M (2020) A Magnetometry Survey of the Second Augustan Legionary Fortress at Lake Farm, Dorset. Britannia 51
- Russell, M (2019) Farewell two arms: a Roman Bronze Body Part from Halnaker, West Sussex. Sussex Archaeological Collections 157
- Russell, M (2019) Mythmakers of Maiden Castle: Breaking the Siege Mentality of an Iron Age Hillfort. Oxford Journal of Archaeology 38
- Russell, M, Smith, M, Cheetham, P, Evans, D and Manley, H (2019) The girl with the chariot medallion: a well-furnished, Late Iron Age Durotrigian burial from Langton Herring, Dorset. Archaeological Journal 176
- Russell, M (2018) Facing up to Constantine: Reassessing the Stonegate monumental head from York. Britannia 49
- Russell, M (2016) The Pulborough Head: a mid-3rd-century Roman stone portrait from West Sussex. Sussex Archaeological Collections 154
- Russell, M (2016) A first-century Roman copper-alloy portrait bust from Tarrant Rushton. Proceedings of the Dorset Natural History & Archaeological Society 137
- Russell, M and Manley, H (2016) Sanctioning memory: Changing identity. Using 3d laser scanning to identify two 'new' portraits of the emperor Nero in English antiquarian collections. Internet Archaeology doi:10.11141/ia.42.2
- Russell, M and Manley, H (2015) Trajan Places: Establishing Identity and Context for the Bosham and Hawkshaw Heads. Britannia 46
- Russell, M and Manley, H (2013) Finding Nero: shining a new light on Romano-British sculpture. Internet Archaeology 32 doi:10.11141/ia.32.5
- Russell, M (2013) A near life-size, togate bust from Chichester, West Sussex. Britannia 44
- Russell, M and Manley, H (2013) A case of mistaken identity? Laser-scanning the bronze "Claudius" from near Saxmundham. Journal of Roman Archaeology 26
- Russell, M (2004) The Treachery of Images: Deconstructing the Neolithic Monumental Architecture of the South Downs. IN Cotton, J and Field, D (eds) Towards a New Stone Age: Aspects of the Neolithic in South-East England. York: Council for British Archaeology.
- Russell, M (2002) Excavations at Mile Oak Farm. IN Rudling, D (ed) Downland Settlement and Land-use: The Archaeology of the Brighton Bypass. London: Archetype
- Russell, M (2002) No More Heroes Any More: The Dangerous World of the Pop Culture Archaeologist. Digging Holes in Popular Culture: Archaeology and Science Fiction. Oxford: Oxbow Books
- Russell, M (2000) Of Flint Mines and Fossil Men: The Lavant Caves Deception. Oxford Journal of Archaeology 19
- Russell, M and Darvill, T (1999) Excavations at the multi-ditched enclosure on Skibrick Hill 1998. Billown Neolithic Landscape Project, Isle of Man: fourth report: 1998 Bournemouth University and Manx National Heritage.
- Russell, M (1997) NEO- “Realism?”: An alternative look at the Neolithic chalkland database of Sussex. IN Topping, P (ed) Neolithic Landscapes. Oxford: Oxbow Books.
- Russell, M (1996) Problems of Phasing: A Reconsideration of the Black Patch Middle Bronze Age Nucleated Village. Oxford Journal of Archaeology 15
- Russell, M and Rudling, D (1996) Excavations at Whitehawk Neolithic Enclosure, Brighton, East Sussex: 1991-93. Sussex Archaeological Collections 134

== Television ==
- Mysteries in the Landscape (2002)
- Seven Ages of Britain (2003)
- Timewatch (Piltdown Man) (2003)
- Time Team (2004-2012)
- Time Team: Big Roman Dig (2005)
- Gangsters de la science (2005)
- Timewatch (Stonehenge) (2009)
- The One Show (2010)
- Digging for Britain (2010-2019)
- A History of Ancient Britain, Series 2, Age of Romans (2011)
- Petworth House: The Big Spring Clean (2011)
- Rome’s Lost Legion (2011)
- Time Team Special: Rediscovering Ancient Britain (2012)
- The Sacred Landscapes of Britain (2014)
- Border Country: The Story of Britain's Lost Middleland (2014)
- Operation Stonehenge: what lies beneath (2014)
- Secrets from the Sky: Maiden Castle (2014)
- Underground Britain (2014)
- Digging For Britain (2015)
- Der Schädel-Schwindel (2016)
- History's Greatest Hoaxes: Piltdown Man (2016)
- King Arthur's Britain: the Truth Unearthed (2018)
- London: 2000 Years of History (2019)
- Digging for Britain: the Greatest Discoveries (2019)
- Walking Britain's Roman Roads: Stane Street (2020)
- Mystic Britain: the search for King Arthur (2020)
