= Duropolis =

Archaeological site in England

- Location within Dorset
- 50.78°N 2.21°W
- Type: Settlement
- Periods: Iron Age
- Associated with: Durotriges
- Location: Winterborne Kingston

History
- Built: 100 BCE
- Built by: Durotriges tribe
- Abandoned: c. 70 CE

Site notes
- Area: 320,000 m^{2} (3,400,000 sq ft)
- Excavation dates: 2008; 2015-17
- Public access: No

Duropolis is the name of an archaeological site at Winterborne Kingston in the English county of Dorset, believed to be the remains of the first planned town in Britain. The site's first discoveries were made in 2008 led by co-directors Miles Russell and Paul Cheetham. The 32,000 square metres (340,000 sq ft) Iron Age settlement is believed to date to around 100 BCE, making it 70 years older than the Roman town of Silchester.

== Overview ==
The site has been named by archaeologists after the Iron Age Durotriges tribe. Its settlement may have been associated with the abandonment of nearby Maiden Castle in the 1st century BCE.

In 2025, archeologists described the "women-centric society" of the Durotriges, a Celtic tribe, in the area dated from about 100 B.C. to A.D. 100. Under a system called matrilocality, women remained in their ancestral communities and men migrated for marriage. The scientists had "a bit of a shock" when they identified "such a strong signature of matrilocality," said Lara Cassidy, an assistant professor in genetics at Trinity College Dublin who led the study. They found maternal lineages typical of matrilocality when they analysed the genomes of 57 Durotrigan people. It was the first time this system had been identified in European prehistory.

Two Middle Iron Age banjo enclosures have been discovered to the north of site. Excavation of the first banjo enclosure between 2009-2013 found 23 burials. 20 of these burials were contemporary with the Duropolis phase of occupation.

== Discovery ==
Found in July 2015 by students from Bournemouth University as part of the Durotriges Big Dig project, the remains of 16 Iron Age roundhouses have been excavated while geophysical survey shows a total of at least 150 roundhouses and other features in the area.

Excavations continued in 2016 and 2017. In the course of the 2016 excavation, discoveries were made that suggested "the elements of an urban system" existing before the Roman invasion, according to Russell. The 2017 dig targeted a putative Iron Age farmstead.

Nine crouched burials, thought to date from the Iron Age, that were discovered during the excavation were sent to Bournemouth University for analysis.

== Animal burials ==
A number of animal skeletons discovered at the site suggest that the Iron Age Celtic population may have believed in hybrid-animal monster myths akin to those of the Mesopotamians, Ancient Greeks and Egyptians. The bone finds, which appear to have been deliberately arranged, include a two-headed hybrid with a sheep's skull at the front and a bull's at the rear along with a horse with a cow's horn sticking into its forehead.
