= Lindinis =

Roman town in Somerset, England

Coordinates: 51.001°N 2.682°W

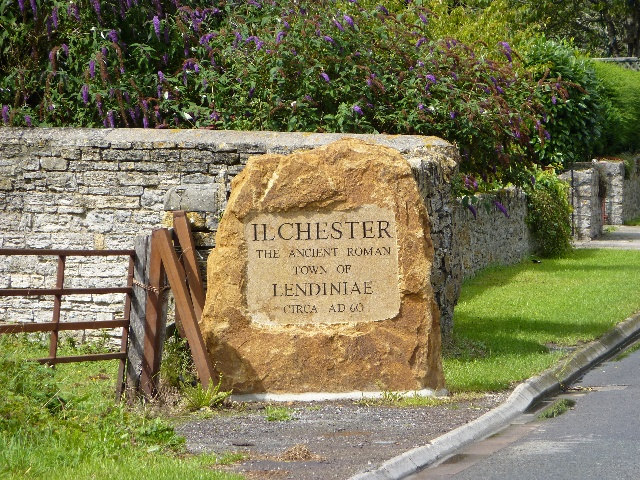
Modern boundary stone commemorating the Roman origins of Ilchester

Lindinis or Lendiniae was a small walled town in the Roman province of Britannia Superior. The settlement developed around an early Roman fort. When the Roman military abandoned the fort in the first century CE, it became an urbanised area within the territory of the Durotriges tribe. It had private dwelling, workshops, small industry and agriculture.

Following the end of Roman rule in Britain, the town remained occupied by native Britons until it was subsumed into the Anglo-Saxon Kingdom of Wessex in the Early Middle Ages. The town is now Ilchester, located in the English county of Somerset in the United Kingdom.

== Toponym ==
The name "Lindinis" appears in the 7th-century Ravenna Cosmography. The alternative *Lendiniae is derived from two inscribed construction stones from Hadrian's Wall which refer to a detachment from the Lendinienses tribe of the Durotriges" (Latin: Civitas Durotragum Lendiniensis). The inscriptions seem to imply that the town was a separate tribal capital from the known one at Dorchester (Durnovaria). It appears to be a Latinization of the Brittonic for "swampy lake".

== History ==
=== Prehistoric ===
There were two large Iron Age hillforts in the region of Lindinis at Ham Hill and Cadbury. There was also a small settlement to the south of the site of the later Roman town.

=== Roman ===
A timber-walled fort (Latin: castrum) was established at Ilchester around AD 60 and later a second fort seems to have been built. It protected the crossing of the Fosse Way over the River Yeo. Originally surrounded by native round houses, these were later supplanted by an unplanned settlement (vicus) of around 30 acres (120,000 m^{2}). The post was abandoned in the late 1st century, after which a street grid was set up with timber domestic dwellings and workshops, as well as outer roadside industrial suburbs. There is evidence of iron, glass, and bone working and pottery production, as well as agricultural plots within the town. In the late 2nd century, the central area was surrounded by a defensive bank and ditch with stone gateways. Stone walls were erected in the mid-4th century. It became the only walled town in the territory of the Durotriges other than Durnovaria. By this time, the town seems to have largely consisted of private homes of owners rich enough to install fine mosaic floors. More than thirty have been discovered and it has been suggested that the town contained a workshop of the Corinium Saltire School of mosaicists or else boasted its own 'Lindinis School'.

=== Medieval ===
Pottery imported into the area after the Roman withdrawal from Britain around 410 imply the site continued to be occupied over the next century, although the local elite may have then relocated to the nearby hillfort of South Cadbury. Ford identified Lindinis as the Cair Pensa vel Coyt listed among the 28 cities of Britain by the History of the Britons, taking the name as a reference to Penselwood (coit being Welsh for "forest"), although others such as Mommsen and Ussher instead read vel as the Latin for "or"—"Pensa or Coyt"—and tentatively associate it with Isca at present-day Exeter.

== See also ==
- Ilchester, for the later history of the settlement
