= Chalbury Hillfort =

Iron Age hillfort in Dorset, England

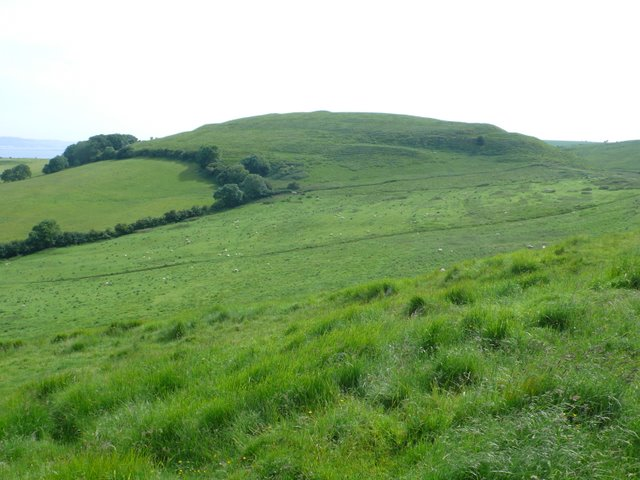
- Viewed from Green Hill to the north

- Location within Dorset
- 50°39′13″N 2°25′56″W
- Type: Hillfort
- Periods: Bronze Age; Iron Age
- Location: Near Bincombe, Dorset
- OS grid reference: SY 695 838

Site notes
- Elevation: 116 m (381 ft)
- Area: 3.4 hectares (8.4 acres)

Scheduled monument
- Official name: Multi-period archaeological landscape centred on and including a slight univallate hillfort called Chalbury, two bowl barrows, part of a Bronze Age urnfield and a series of medieval strip fields
- Designated: 8 November 1928
- Reference no.: 1002711

Chalbury Hillfort is an Iron Age hillfort roughly 1 mile (1.6 km) south-east of the village of Bincombe, in Dorset, England. It is a scheduled monument.

== Description ==
The site is in a strategic position, 380 feet (116 m) above sea level; Weymouth Bay is about 1.5 miles (2.4 km) to the south. The hill is an outcrop of the Dorset Ridgeway.

There is a single rampart in roughly a D-shape and an external ditch, enclosing about 3.4 hectares (8.4 acres). The rampart is about 0.3–1.0 metre (1 ft 0 in – 3 ft 3 in) above the interior for most of its length, and about 6.5 metres (21 ft) above the external ditch. There is a gap entrance in the south-east.

There are medieval strip lynchets surrounding the fort, and running into the rampart on the north side.

There are many circular depressions within the enclosure, and at least 20 are probably contemporary storage pits. Around the perimeter are at least 30 platforms, which are thought to be huts. Also within the enclosure are two Bronze Age bowl barrows, 18.5–20 metres (61–66 ft) in diameter and about 1.7 metres (5.6 ft) high.

There is an interior quarry ditch behind the rampart north of the entrance, from which material was used to construct the fort.

The site was excavated by Miss M. Whitley in 1939. The rampart was found to have limestone revetments. Apart from a few finds of the late Bronze Age and the Romano-British period, most of the finds showed two phases of occupation in the early Iron Age.

== See also ==
- Hillforts in Britain
