= Dumnonii =

Celtic tribe in southwestern Britain during the Iron Age

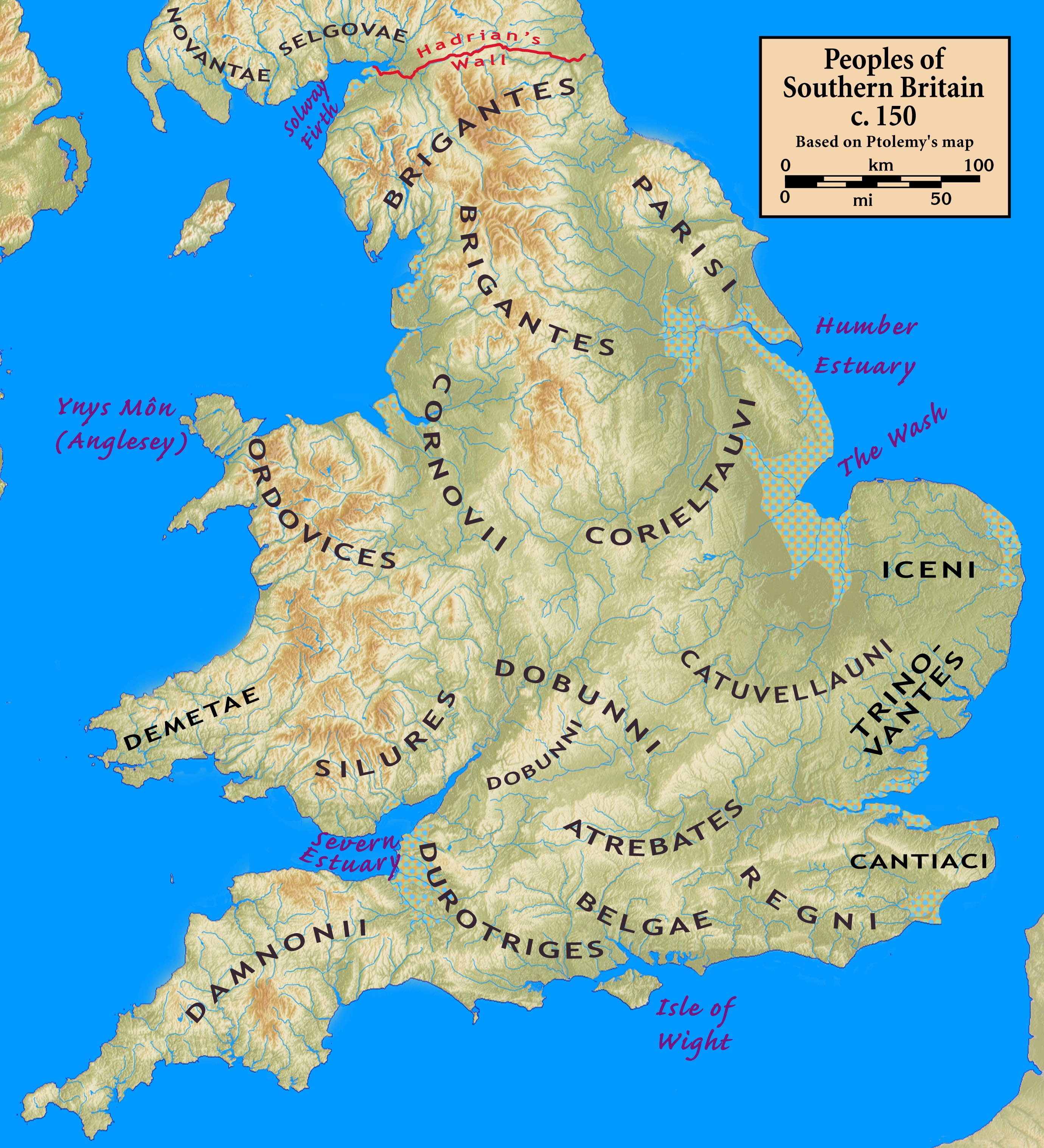

Geography
- Capital: Isca Dumnoniorum (Exeter)
- Location: Cornwall; Devon; West Somerset
- Rulers: Kings of Dumnonia

The Dumnonii or Dumnones were a British tribe who inhabited Dumnonia, the area now known as Cornwall and Devon (and some areas of present-day Dorset and Somerset) in the further parts of the South West peninsula of Britain, from at least the Iron Age up to the early Saxon period. They were bordered to the east by the Durotriges tribe.

== Etymology ==
William Camden, in his 1607 edition of Britannia, describes Cornwall and Devon as being two parts of the same 'country' which:

was in ancient time inhabited by those Britains whom Solinus called Dunmonii, Ptolomee Damnonii, or (as we find in some other copies) more truly Danmonii. ... . But... the Country of this nation is at this day divided into two parts, known by later names of Cornwall and Denshire [Devonshire] ... The near or hithermore region of the Danmonians that I spake of is now commonly called Denshire, [or] by the Cornish-Britains 'Dewnan', and by the Welsh Britains 'Duffneint' [sic], that is, 'low valleys', for that the people dwell for the most part beneath in Vales; by the English Saxons [it is known as] 'Deven-schire', whereof grew the Latin name 'Devonia', and by that contraction which the vulgar people useth, 'Denshire'.

Camden had learnt some Welsh during the course of his studies and it would appear that he is the origin of the interpretation of Dumnonii as "deep valley dwellers" from his understanding of the Welsh of his time. The modern Welsh term is Dyfnaint. John Rhŷs later theorized that the tribal name was derived from the name of a goddess, Domnu, probably meaning "the goddess of the deep". The proto-Celtic root *dubno- or *dumno- meaning "the deep" or "the earth" (or alternatively meaning "dark" or "gloomy") appears in personal names such as Dumnorix and Dubnovellaunus. Another group with a similar name but with no known links were the Fir Domnann of Connacht.

The Roman name of the town of Exeter, Isca Dumnoniorum ("Isca of the Dumnonii"), contains the root *iska- "water" for "Water of the Dumnonii". The Latin name suggests that the city was already an oppidum, or walled town, on the banks on the River Exe before the foundation of the Roman city, in about AD 50. The Dumnonii gave their name to the English county of Devon, and their name is represented in Britain's two extant Brythonic languages as Dewnens in Cornish and Dyfnaint in Welsh. Amédée Thierry (Histoire des Gaulois, 1828), one of the inventors of the historic race of Gauls, could confidently equate them with the Cornish ("les Cornouailles").

Victorian historians often referred to the tribe as the Damnonii, which is also the name of another people from lowland Scotland, although there are no known links between the two populations.

== Language ==
The people of Dumnonia spoke a Southwestern Brythonic dialect of Celtic similar to the forerunner of more recent Cornish and Breton. Irish immigrants, the Déisi, are evidenced by the Ogham-inscribed stones they have left behind, confirmed and supplemented by toponymical studies. The stones are sometimes inscribed in Latin, sometimes in both scripts. Tristram Risdon suggested the continuance of a Brythonic dialect in the South Hams, Devon, as late as the 14th century, in addition to its use in Cornwall.

== Territory ==
The location of the Dumnonii in what is now Cornwall and Devon.

Ptolemy's 2nd century Geography places the Dumnonii to the west of the Durotriges. The name purocoronavium that appears in the Ravenna Cosmography implies the existence of a sub-tribe called the Cornavii or Cornovii, perhaps the ancestors of the Cornish people.

Gaius Iulius Solinus, probably in the 3rd century, remarks: "This turbid strait also divides the island Silura from the shore which is held by the Dumnonii, a British tribe. The men of this island even now preserve an old custom: they do not use coins. They give and accept, obtaining the necessities of life by exchange rather than by money. They reverence gods, and the men and women equally declare knowledge of the future."

In the sub-Roman period a Brythonic kingdom called Dumnonia emerged, covering the entire peninsula, although it is believed by some to have effectively been a collection of sub-kingdoms.

A kingdom of Domnonée (and of Cornouaille alongside) was established in the province of Armorica directly across the English Channel, and has apparent links with the British population, suggesting an ancient connection of peoples along the western Atlantic seaboard which is also borne out by the modern genetics of Devonian and Cornish populations.

== Settlements ==
=== Isca Dumnoniorum ===
The Latin name for Exeter is Isca Dumnoniorum ("Water of the Dumnonii"). This oppidum (a Latin term meaning an important town) on the banks of River Exe certainly existed prior to the foundation of the Roman city in about AD 50. Isca is derived from the Brythonic word for flowing water, which was given to the River Exe. The Gaelic term for water is uisce/uisge. This is reflected in the Welsh name for Exeter: Caerwysg meaning "fortified settlement on the river Uisc".

Isca Dumnoniorum originated with a settlement that developed around the Roman fortress of the Legio II Augusta and is one of the four poleis (cities) attributed to the tribe by Ptolemy. It is also listed in two routes of the late 2nd century Antonine Itinerary.

A legionary bath-house was built inside the fortress sometime between 55 and 60 and underwent renovation shortly afterwards (c. 60-65) but by c. 68 (perhaps even 66) the legion had transferred to a newer fortress at Gloucester. This saw the dismantling of the Isca fortress, and the site was then abandoned. Around AD 75, work on the civitas forum and basilica had commenced on the site of the former principia and by the late 2nd century the civitas walls had been completed. They were 3 metres thick and 6 metres high and enclosed exactly the same area as the earlier fortress. However, by the late 4th century the civitas was in decline.

Next to these [the Durotriges], but more to the west, are the Dumnoni, whose towns are:
Voliba 14°45 52°00
Uxella 15°00 52°45
Tamara 15°00 52°15
Isca, where is located Legio II Augusta 17°30 52°45.

— Ptolemy, Geography II.ii.

=== Other settlements ===
As well as Isca Dumnoniorum, Ptolemy's 2nd century Geography names three other towns:

- Voliba, which remains unidentified,
- Uxella, possibly on the River Axe, or at Launceston, and
- Tamara, generally considered to be somewhere on the River Tamar.

The Ravenna Cosmography includes the last two names (in slightly different forms, as "Tamaris" and "Uxelis"), and adds several more names which may be settlements in the territory. These include:

- Nemetostatio, a name relating to nemeton, signifying "sanctuary' or "sacred grove". Probably to be identified with North Tawton in Devon where there is a Roman earthwork that may be military, or possibly a tax collection station.
- Purocoronavis, which may refer to an important native hill fort, such as Carn Brea or Tintagel. The name has led to speculation about the Cornish Cornovii.

Other Romano-British sites in Dumnonia include:

- Topsham, Devon - a settlement and harbour that served Isca Dumnoniorum to which it was connected by road and river.
- Nanstallon (Cornwall) - a square military enclosure, seemingly associated with tin workings at nearby Boscarne.
- Mount Batten (Devon) - an Iron Age tin port that continued into Roman times.
- Plymouth (Devon) - evidence of a Roman settlement has been found on the north side of the harbour.
- Ictis - an ancient port trading in tin.

New settlements continued to be built throughout the Roman period, including sites at Chysauster and Trevelgue Head. The style is native in form with no Romanised features. Near Padstow, a site of some importance that was inhabited from the late Bronze/early Iron Age to the mid 6th century now lies buried under the sands on the opposite side of the Camel estuary near St. Enodoc's Church, and may have been a western coastal equivalent of a Saxon Shore Fort. Byzantine and African pottery has been discovered at the site. At Magor Farm in Illogan, near Camborne, an archaeological site has been identified as being a villa.

== Archaeology ==
The Dumnonii are thought to have occupied relatively isolated territory in Cornwall, Devon, Somerset and possibly part of Dorset. Their cultural connections, as expressed in their ceramics, were with the peninsula of Armorica across the Channel, rather than with the southeast of Britain. They do not seem to have been politically centralised: coins are relatively rare, none of them locally minted, and the structure, distribution and construction of Bronze Age and Iron Age hill forts, Cornish rounds, and defensible farmsteads in the south west point to a number of smaller tribal groups living alongside each other.

Dumnonia is noteworthy for its many settlements that have survived from the Romano-British period, but also for its lack of a villa system. Local archaeology has revealed instead the isolated enclosed farmsteads known locally as rounds. These seem to have survived the Roman abandonment of Britain, but were subsequently replaced, in the 6th and 7th centuries, by the unenclosed farms taking the Brythonic toponymic tre-.

As in most other Brythonic areas, Iron Age hill forts, such as Hembury Castle, were refortified for the use of chieftains or kings. Other high-status settlements such as Tintagel seem to have been reconstructed during this period. Post-Roman imported pottery has been excavated from many sites across the region, and the apparent surge in late 5th century Mediterranean and/or Byzantine imports is yet to be explained satisfactorily.

== Industries ==
Apart from fishing and agriculture, the main economic resource of the Dumnonii was tin mining. The area of Dumnonia had been mined since ancient times, and the tin was exported from the ancient trading port of Ictis (St Michael's Mount). Tin extraction (mainly by streaming) had existed here from the early Bronze Age around the 22nd century BC. West Cornwall, around Mount's Bay, was traditionally thought to have been visited by metal traders from the eastern Mediterranean

During the first millennium BC trade became more organised, first with the Phoenicians, who settled Gades (Cádiz) around 1100 BC, and later with the Greeks, who had settled Massilia (Marseille) and Narbo (Narbonne) around 600 BC. Smelted Cornish tin was collected at Ictis whence it was conveyed across the Bay of Biscay to the mouth of the Loire and then to Gades via the Loire and Rhone valleys. It went then through the Mediterranean Sea in ships to Gades.

During the period c. 500-450 BC, the tin deposits seem to have become more important, and fortified settlements appear such as at Chun Castle and Kenidjack Castle, to protect both the tin smelters and mines.

The earliest account of Cornish tin mining was written by Pytheas of Massilia late in the 4th century BC after his circumnavigation of the British Isles. Underground mining was described in this account, although it cannot be determined when it had started. Pytheas's account was noted later by other writers including Pliny the Elder and Diodorus Siculus.

It is likely that the tin trade with the Mediterranean was later on under the control of the Veneti. Britain was one of the places proposed for the Cassiterides, that is Tin Islands. Tin working continued throughout Roman occupation although it appears that output declined because of new supplies brought in from the deposits discovered in Iberia (Spain and Portugal). However, when these supplies diminished, production in Dumnonia increased and appears to have reached a peak during the 3rd century AD.

== Sub-Roman and post-Roman Dumnonia ==
The Sub-Roman or Post-Roman history of Dumnonia comes from a variety of sources and is considered exceedingly difficult to interpret given that historical fact, legend and confused pseudo-history are compounded by a variety of sources in Middle Welsh and Latin. The main sources available for discussion of this period include Gildas's De Excidio Britanniae and Nennius's Historia Brittonum, the Annales Cambriae, Anglo-Saxon Chronicle, William of Malmesbury's Gesta Regum Anglorum and De Antiquitate Glastoniensis Ecclesiae, along with texts from the Black Book of Carmarthen and the Red Book of Hergest, and Bede's Historia ecclesiastica gentis Anglorum as well as "The Descent of the Men of the North" (Bonedd Gwŷr y Gogledd, in Peniarth MS 45 and elsewhere) and the Book of Baglan.

== See also ==
- Cornovii (details of the three tribes bearing the name)
- Damnonii (tribe in central Scotland)
- Dark Ages (historiography)
