= Durotriges =

Celtic Iron-Age tribe from Great Britain

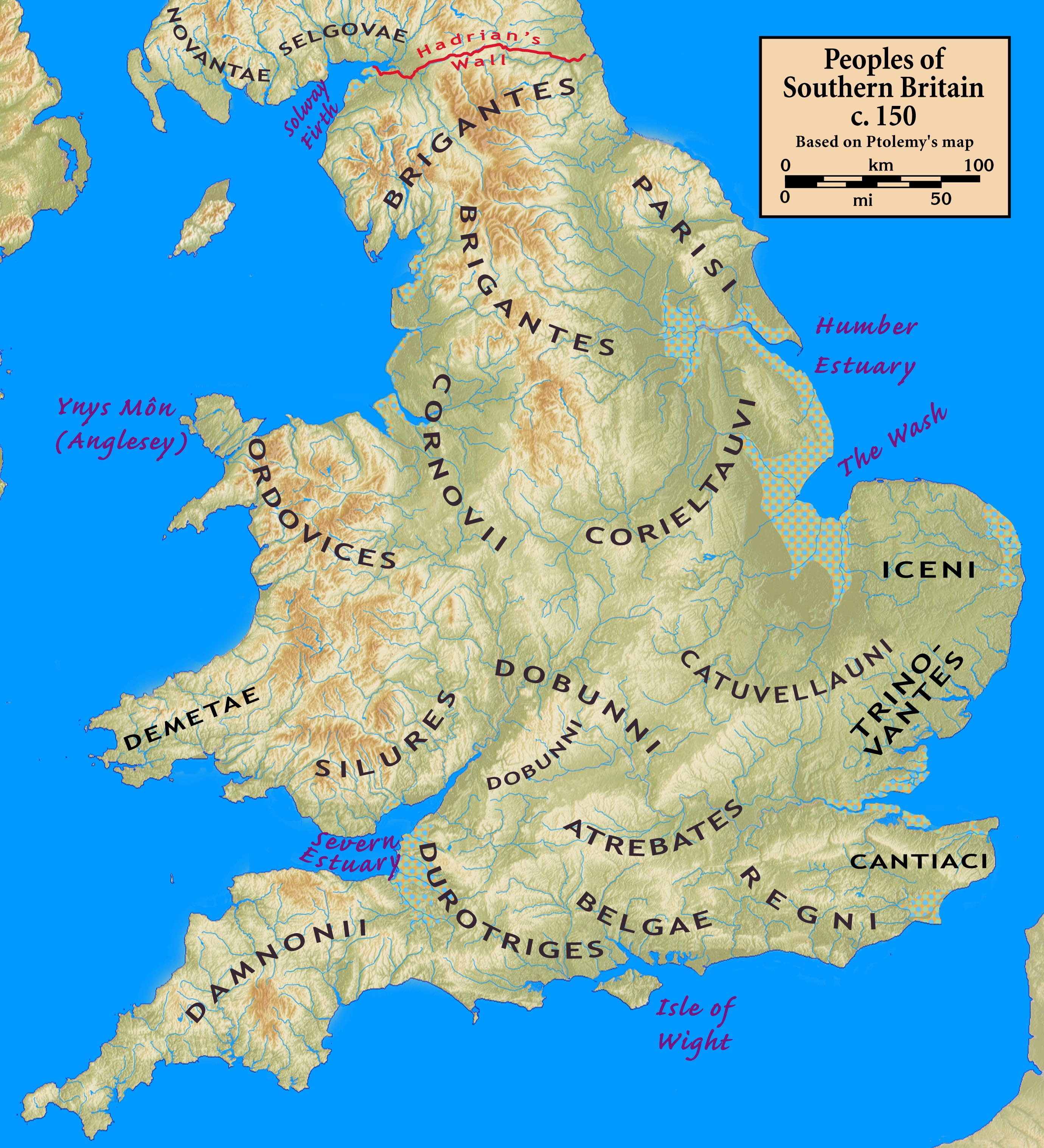

Geography
- Capital: Durnovaria (Dorchester); Dunium (Hengistbury Head)
- Location: Dorset; South Wiltshire; South Somerset; Devon
- Rulers: None known

The Durotriges were one of the Celtic tribes living in Britain prior to the Roman invasion. The tribe lived in modern Dorset, south Wiltshire, south Somerset and Devon east of the River Axe and the discovery of an Iron Age hoard in 2009 at Shalfleet, Isle of Wight gives evidence that they may also have lived in the western half of the island. There is growing evidence to suggest that women held relatively high status in the tribe due to several factors including: high status grave goods found predominantly in female graves and hypothesized matrilocality and matriliny. After the Roman conquest, their main civitates, or settlement-centred administrative units, were Durnovaria (modern Dorchester, "the probable original capital") and Lindinis (modern Ilchester, "whose former, unknown status was thereby enhanced"). Their territory was bordered to the west by the Dumnonii; and to the east by the Belgae.

== Name ==
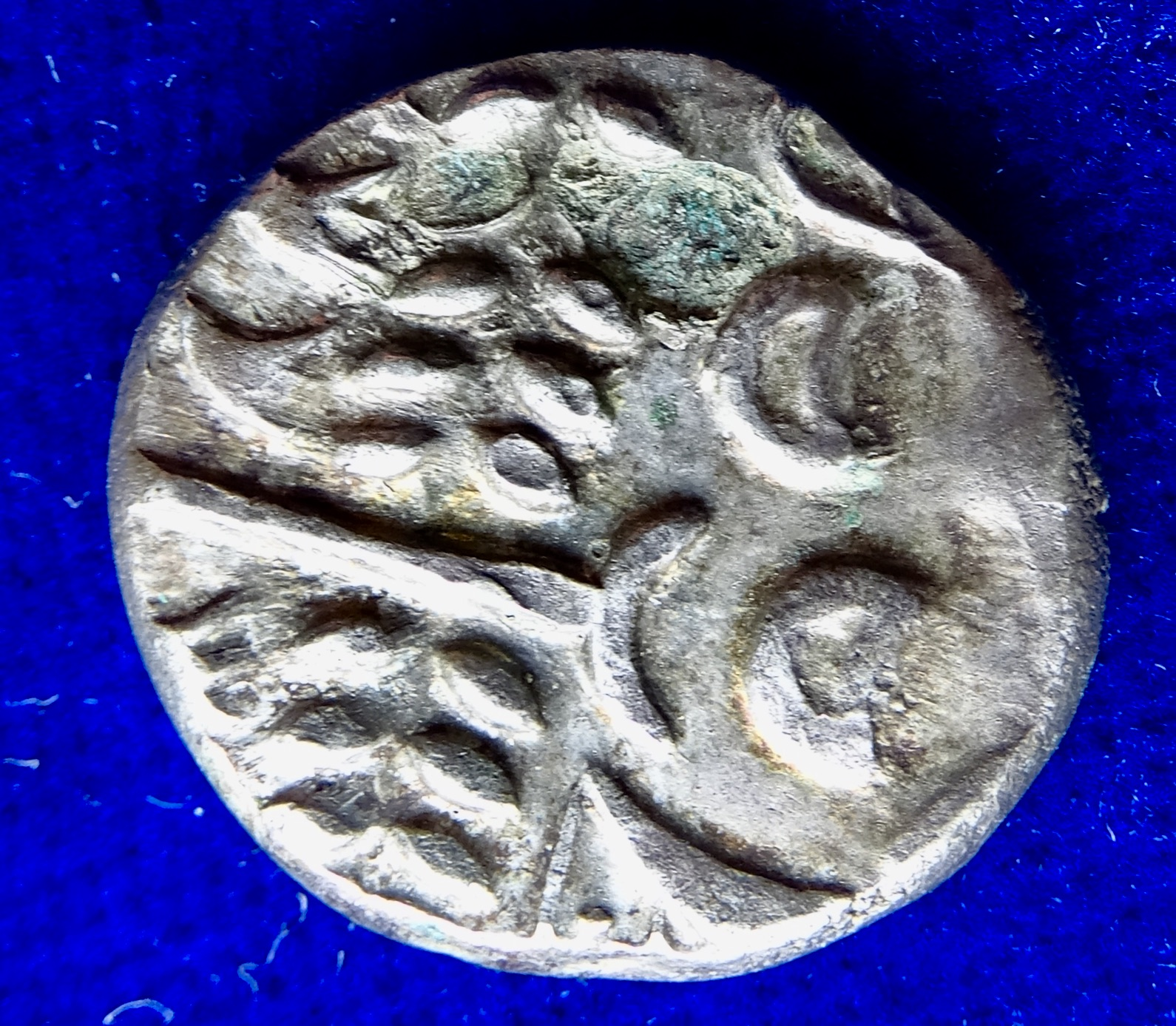
Silver Stater, stylised head of Apollo, about 60 BC, obverse

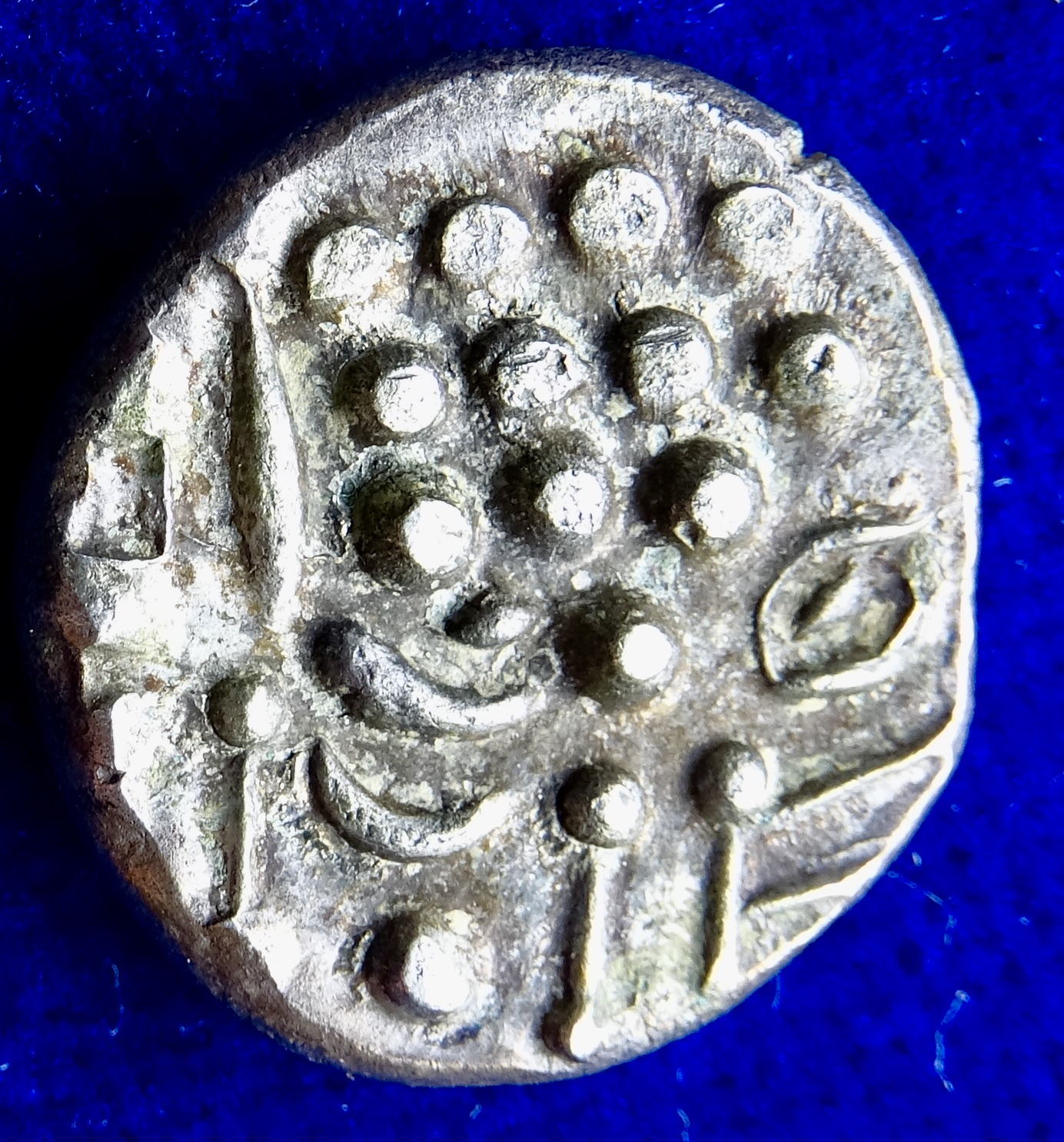
The reverse of this Celtic coin showing a stylised horse with eye behind pellets

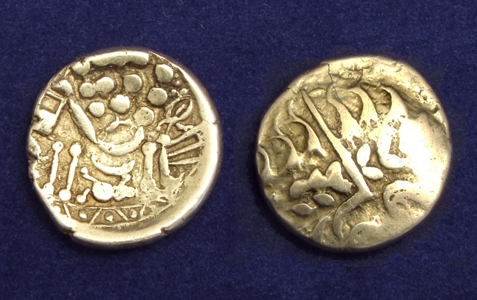
British Celts, gold stater from the Durotriges. Chute type with strongly Celticized, disjointed horse left and abstract head of Apollo on the right.

The tribe's name is known from Ptolemy's Geography and from two inscriptions on Hadrian's Wall, both dating from after the Roman conquest of Britain. It is not known if anyone referred to them as the Durotriges before they arrived in the area now known as Dorset.

The name is transliterated in ancient greek as Δουρότριγες in Ptolemy. RIB 1672 and 1673 are inscribed stones recording assistance of the tribe in building Hadrian's Wall.

RIB 1672:

civitas Durotrigum Lendiniensis

RIB 1673:

civitas Duro|tragum Lendi|niensis

The name can probably be broken down into two parts. 'Duro', which means 'hard' or 'strong place' and was widely used for early Roman forts, and 'trig' means inhabitant. That would produce a meaning of 'fort dwellers', appropriate for the region's many hill forts (although these appear to have been largely abandoned by the time of the Roman invasion of Britain in AD 43).

'Duro' has also been derived from 'dubro', the British word for water ('dour' or 'dwr'), and the second element has been interpreted as 'riges', that is 'kings'.

== Territory ==
Territory of the Durotriges

The area of the Durotriges is identified in part by coin finds: few Durotrigan coins are found in the "core" area, where they were apparently unacceptable and were reminted. To their north and east were the Belgae, beyond the Avon and its tributary Wylye: "the ancient division is today reflected in the county division between Wiltshire and Somerset."

Their main outlet for the trade across the Channel, strong in the first half of the 1st century BC, when the potter's wheel was introduced, then drying up in the decades before the advent of the Romans, was at Hengistbury Head. Numismatic evidence shows progressive debasing of the coinage, suggesting economic retrenchment accompanying the increased cultural isolation. Analysis of the body of Durotrigan ceramics suggests to Cunliffe that the production was increasingly centralised, at Poole Harbour (Cunliffe 2005:183).

The Durotriges were possibly more of a tribal confederation than a discrete tribe. They were one of the groups that issued coinage before the Roman conquest, part of the cultural "periphery", as Barry Cunliffe characterised them, round the "core group" of Britons in the south. These coins were rather simple and had no inscriptions, and thus no names of coin-issuers can be known, let alone evidence about monarchs or rulers. Nevertheless, the Durotriges presented a settled society, based in the farming of lands surrounded by hill forts, the majority of which seem to have gone out of use by 100 BC, long before the arrival of the Roman II Legion, commanded by Vespasian in 43 or 44 AD. Maiden Castle is a preserved example of one of these earlier hill forts.

== Settlements ==
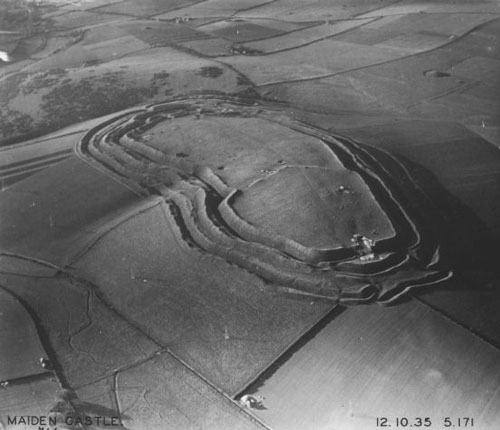
Maiden Castle, Dorset was in the territory of the Durotriges

The absorption of the Durotriges' ruling families into the Roman province of Britannia and the extent of Romanisation makes documenting the names of settlements occupied by the Durotriges before the Roman conquest difficult, but from a variety of sources several places are known. Ptolemy's Geography lists Dunium, speculated to be Hengistbury Head, as an important tribal centre near their Belgae neighbours, but it is unknown whether if it was considered the capital of the tribal confederation, especially as several other settlements appear to be equally important from archaeological evidence. Known places of pre-conquest settlement include:

- Woolsbarrow Hillfort
- Maiden Castle
- Cadbury Castle
- Ham Hill
- Abbotsbury Castle, Allington, Dorset,
- Badbury Rings, Banbury Hill, Bindon Hill, Buzbury Rings
- Chalbury Hillfort, Coney's Castle,
- Dungeon Hill,
- Eggardon Hill,
- Flower's Barrow,
- Hambledon Hill, Hod Hill,
- Lambert's Castle, Lewesdon Hill,
- Pilsdon Pen, Poundbury Hill
- Rawlsbury Camp
- Duropolis

== Culture ==
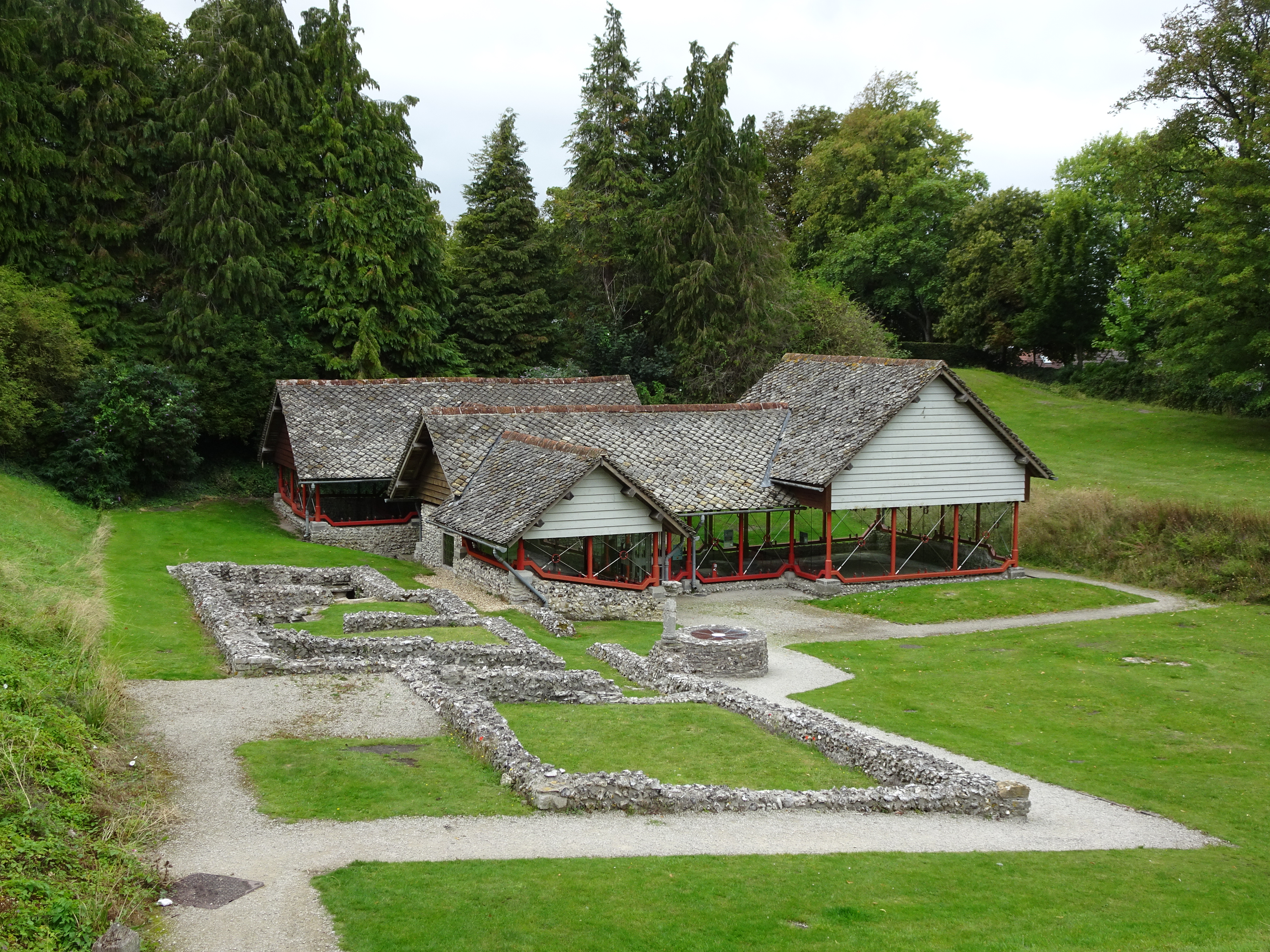
Remains of a Roman town house in Dorchester

Burial of Durotriges was by inhumation, with a last ritual meal provided even under exiguous circumstances, as in the eight burials at Maiden Castle, carried out immediately after the Roman attack. Most Durotrigian burials are laid down in crouched positions within shallow, oval graves. One such inhumation of a young Durotrigian woman was found at Langton Herring in Dorset in 2010. The burial, which was laid down with a decorated mirror, had a radiocarbon date of between AD 25 – 53.

Although it was previously thought that the Durotriges strongly resisted the Roman invasion of AD 43/44, the historian Suetonius recording some battles fought between tribes of southern Britain and the second legion Augusta, then commanded by Vespasian, we do not know if the Durotriges, in particular, were involved. Mortimer Wheeler, who reported on the excavation of Maiden Castle conducted by himself and Tessa Wheeler between 1934 and 1938, interpreted a cemetery uncovered in the hill fort's east gate as evidence for a savage Roman assault. Later examination of Maiden Castle by Niall Sharples in 1985-6 and geophysical survey conducted in 2015 by Dave Stewart have shown that Wheeler's interpretation of a siege and subsequent massacre is unlikely. By 70 AD, the tribe was already starting to be Romanised and securely included in the Roman province of Britannia. In the tribe's area, the Romans explored some quarries and supported a local pottery industry.

The Durotriges, and their relationship with the Roman Empire, form the basis for an ongoing archaeological research project directed by Paul Cheetham, Ellen Hambleton and Miles Russell of Bournemouth University. The Durotriges Project has, since 2009, been reconsidering the Iron Age to Roman transition through a detailed programme of field survey, geophysical investigation and targeted excavation. To date the programme of work has concentrated upon an enclosed late Iron Age banjo enclosure containing round houses, work surfaces and storage pits, a Late Iron Age cemetery, two Roman villas and a large Late Iron Age roundhouse settlement referred to as Duropolis.

A study published in 2025 of 57 Durotrigian genomes found that settlements were based on maternal lineages, with incoming unrelated males. A matrilocal residence pattern has not been previously found in European archaeology.

== See also ==
- Abbotsbury Castle
- Castle Rings, Wiltshire
- List of Celtic tribes
