= Hinton St Mary Mosaic =

Roman mosaic

The Hinton St Mary Mosaic
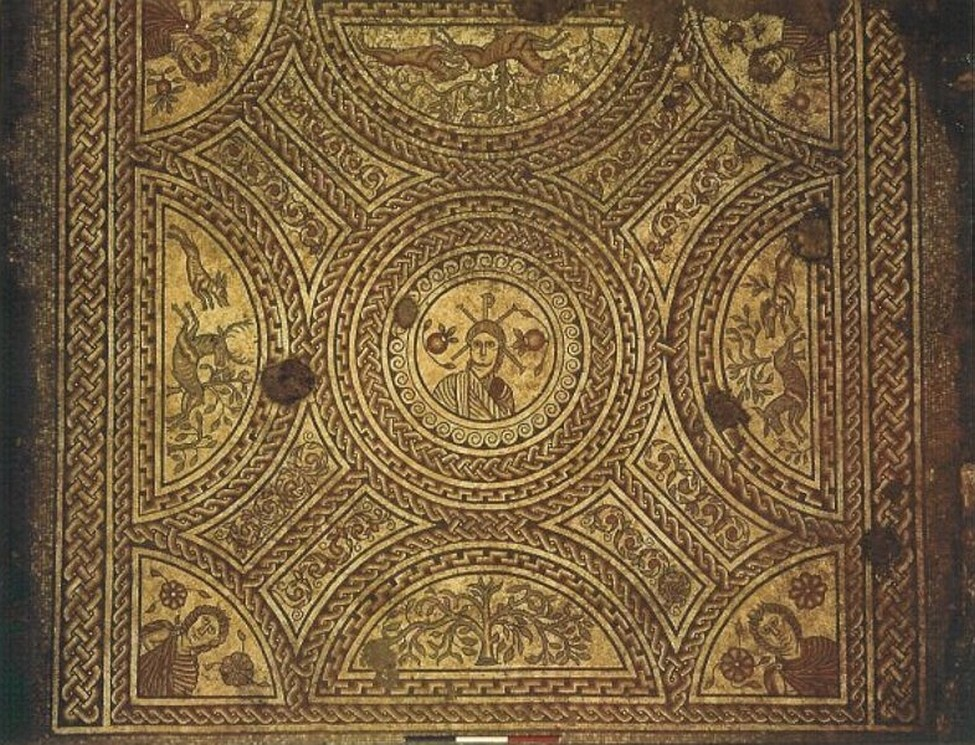
- Material: Ceramic
- Created: early 4th century
- Period/culture: Romano-British (Christian)
- Place: Hinton St Mary villa, Dorset
- Present location: G49/wall, British Museum, London
- Registration: 1965,0409.1

The Hinton St Mary Mosaic is a large, almost complete Roman mosaic discovered at Hinton St Mary, Dorset, England, in 1963. It appears to feature a portrait bust of Jesus Christ as its central motif, which could be the oldest depiction of Jesus Christ anywhere in the Roman Empire. A second mosaic was found during 2022 excavations on the site. The mosaic was chosen as Object 44 in the BBC Radio 4 programme A History of the World in 100 Objects, presented by British Museum director Neil MacGregor.

The mosaic has two wings in its north-east angle set at about a right angle. The room is 8.5 m (28 ft) by 6 m (20 ft), connected to the east-west long axis. The mosaic covered two rooms, joined by a small decorated threshold. It is largely red, yellow and cream in colouring. On stylistic grounds it has been dated to the 4th century and is attributed to the mosaic workshop of Durnovaria (modern Dorchester). It is currently in storage at the British Museum, although the central medallion is on display there.

== Christian panel ==
The panel in the larger room is 17 by 15 feet (5.2 by 4.6 m). A central circle surrounds a portrait bust of a man wearing what might be a pallium standing before a Christian chi-rho symbol flanked by two pomegranates. He is generally identified as Christ, although the Emperor Constantine I has also been suggested despite the absence of any insignia or identifiers pointing to a particular emperor other than the chi-rho. On each side of this are four lunettes, each featuring conventional forest and hunting vignettes, mostly of a dog and a deer. In the corners are four quarter circles containing portrait busts, either representing the winds or the seasons.

== Pagan panel ==
The panel in the smaller room is 16 1/2 by 8 feet (5.0 by 2.4 m). It consists of a central circle containing an image of characters from Roman mythology, Bellerophon killing the Chimera. This has been interpreted in a more Christian context as representing good defeating evil. Flanking this are two rectangular panels again featuring dogs hunting deer.

== Context ==
The mosaic was discovered on 12 September 1963 by the local blacksmith, Walter John White. It was cleared by the Dorset County Museum with help from local people and lifted for preservation by the British Museum. It was assumed to have been located in a villa, and the layout of the mosaic room resembles a Roman triclinium, or dining room. However, after excavations in 2021 and 2022 it is no longer thought to be part of a villa. There were no finds dated earlier than c. 270.

== Destruction ==
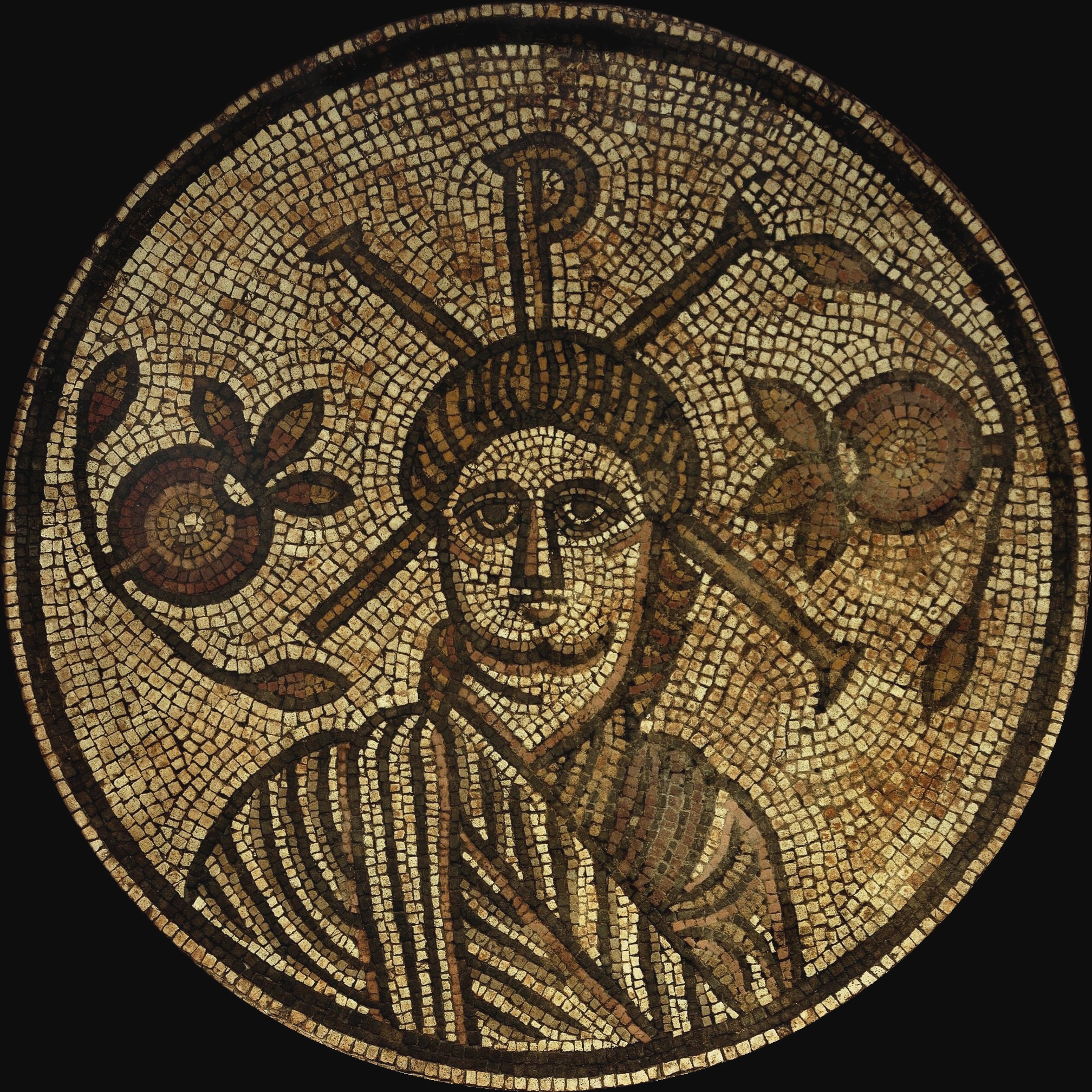
Detail of central roundel mosaic

In 2000, a new roof was erected by architects Foster and Partners to cover the previously open courtyard of the British Museum. As part of this major building work it was decided that the Hinton St Mary mosaic should be moved.

The previously intact mosaic, which was fixed to the museum floor, was levered up and broken into pieces by Museum staff in 1997. Chris Smith, the former Director of 'Art Pavements' which moved the mosaic from Dorset, was described as "outraged at what he saw as an act of vandalism and stated that it was completely unnecessary as moving the mosaic was quite feasible without damage."

The pieces are now stored in boxes in the museum vaults with only the central Christian portrait on display in the Gallery.

The Association for the Study and Preservation of Roman Mosaics protested at the destruction and decision to only display part of the mosaic. They launched a petition which read in full: "We are dismayed by the Museums decision, taken in the late 1990s, to remove the Roman mosaic from Hinton St Mary from public exhibition and ask that it be displayed once more, preferably on the floor, and preferably in the location that it occupied from 1965 to 1997. We believe that, given that the mosaic possibly contains the only known representation of Christ in an ancient pavement, it is of unique importance not just in Britain but in the context of the Roman Empire as a whole, and merits being displayed in its entirety. It is insufficient to show the central roundel in isolation, however important. The full meaning of the pavement can be appreciated only if the whole of it is visible, including the accompanying heads and figure scenes. We would further ask that, if it is impossible to display the complete mosaic in the British Museum, you would consider loaning it to a suitable museum in Dorset, its county of origin".

The Association for the Study and Preservation of Roman Mosaics also produced a factsheet with an explanation of the design of the entire intact mosaic.

== Renewed excavations from 2021 onwards ==
The British Museum asked Dr Peter Guest of Vianova Archaeology to renew excavations in Hinton St Mary in 2021 and 2022 Dr Guest involved local people extensively in the excavations, and wrote in village magazine The Mosaic that the excavations were "a resounding success." Dr Guest also commented that "we are now thinking about organising a 3rd season next year [2023] to find answers to those questions that still remain about Roman Hinton St Mary and to tie up any final loose ends!"

== Possible partial return to Dorset ==
On 2 August 2019, Hinton St Mary villagers and the Chair of the Dorset Unitary Authority were told at a closed-door meeting with the British Museum that the mosaic would be partially returned to the Dorset County Museum. However, the head of Christ would not be returned, as the original would be "loaned to museums worldwide". A replica would be given to the Dorset County Museum.

No answer was given to one attendee's question that: "Given that she [a British Museum curator] boasted the fact that the replicas they made were indistinguishable from the originals, surely it would make more sense to send the replica around the world and keep the original safe in Dorset?"

As of 2021, it was not clear whether the complete mosaic or only a part of it would be displayed in the Dorset Museum.

In July 2022 the Blackmore Vale newspaper reported that "discussions are at an advanced stage with a view to bringing the important Roman artefact to the Dorset County Museum in Dorchester or another site."

The Sturminster Newton Museum (around 2 miles or 3 kilometres south of Hinton St Mary) has a display about the mosaic, its finding and planned return, and the local area in Roman times.

Preceded by 43: Silver plate showing Shapur II	A History of the World in 100 Objects; Object 44	Succeeded by 45: Arabian bronze hand
