= Hannah Gifford =

- Born: 17th century
- Died: 17th century
- Occupation: Teacher

Hannah Gifford was the teacher at a free school that was "one of the most striking achievements of puritan Dorchester" that operated between 1651 and 1668. The town paid for her salary, books, bibles and clothing for dozens of poor children.

== Life ==
Gifford came to notice in 1651 when the town of Dorchester decided to create and fund a school. The Thomas Hardye School (for boys) was already operating but there was no school for the poor. The corporation agreed to pay her £10 a year to look after 30 pupils and to make that up to £12 if there was more than thirty children. In the event there were more than sixty prospective pupils who came either for the education or the offer of free clothing. A few of the recipients of the clothing lost interest after it was received.

Gifford had been born Hannah Gilpin and her father Bernard Galpin had left for America in 1630 on board the Mary and John. She had married Robert Gifford the year before and she and Robert decided to stay. However they were not rich, but they were religious. Robert Gifford was given a charity payment in the 1640s.

Her teaching at the new school was commended. She taught the children to read and to know the catechism. The school had been formed to improve the moral and spiritual well-being and the town paid for bibles and books which were supplied by John Long and William Churchill. The school was said to be "one of the most striking achievements of puritan Dorchester". It was maintained by a payment made on the anniversary of the Gunpowder Plot. The school was operating in 1668 with her as teacher but the school had stopped by 1676.
