= Dorset Martyrs Memorial =

Sculpture in Dorchester, Dorset

Coordinates: 50°42′46″N 2°25′54″W

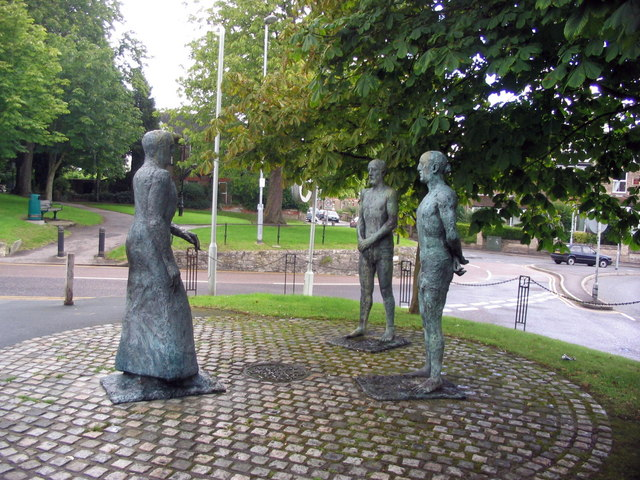
Dorset Martyrs statue

The Dorset Martyrs Memorial is a grade II listed sculpture by Elisabeth Frink in Dorchester, Dorset, England. It was unveiled in 1986 on the site of the gallows where Catholic martyrs were hanged in the 16th and 17th centuries.

The memorial takes the form of two martyrs facing an executioner figure placed in triangular formation, looking inward. Each of the figures stands on a flat rectangular base. This arrangement commemorates the Dorset men and women who suffered for their faith and, in particular, seven known Catholics who were executed where the memorial stands today.

== The commission ==
In the early 1980s, following funding received from the Art Council's Art for Public Places scheme, the Council of Dorset Natural History and Archaeological Society, and the Catholic Community in Dorset, commissioned Elisabeth Frink to make a public sculpture for the site.

Frink lived in Dorset and was greatly inspired by the Dorset landscape and its history. Having been brought up a Catholic, Frink was familiar with the Roman Catholic Church's history in England during the 16th and 17th centuries, and in particular the executions of Catholic recusants in Dorset at that time. She was also impressed by the political intervention of Catholic priests and nuns in the later 20th century, in particular in Central America.

In 1983, maquettes for the sculpture, named the Dorset Martyrs, were exhibited at the Dorset County Museum, and in 1986 the final installation of three standing bronze figures on Gallows Hill was completed.

== Materials and techniques ==
Frink placed the larger-than-life figures not on a raised plinth, but at ground level. Setting the figures on separate bases, Frink explored the placement of the figures in relation to one another using smaller versions of the figures (maquettes). In these earlier versions, Frink explored placing crosses on the bodies of the martyrs, but these were removed to suggest other forms of martyrdom, such as the political martyrs of the 20th century that she was also fascinated by.

Frink made the figures by first creating a skeleton out of chicken wire, and building onto it with wet plaster. She then added materials to that plaster, such as hessian, and this created texture on the surface of the finished bronze. Texture on the figure of the executioner, for example, suggests feeling of chain mail, as seen on the hood.

At the centre of the group is a circular bronze plaque, inscribed with raised lettering: ‘FOR / CHRIST / AND / CONSCIENCE / SAKE'.
