= Roman Town House, Dorchester =

Roman Town House
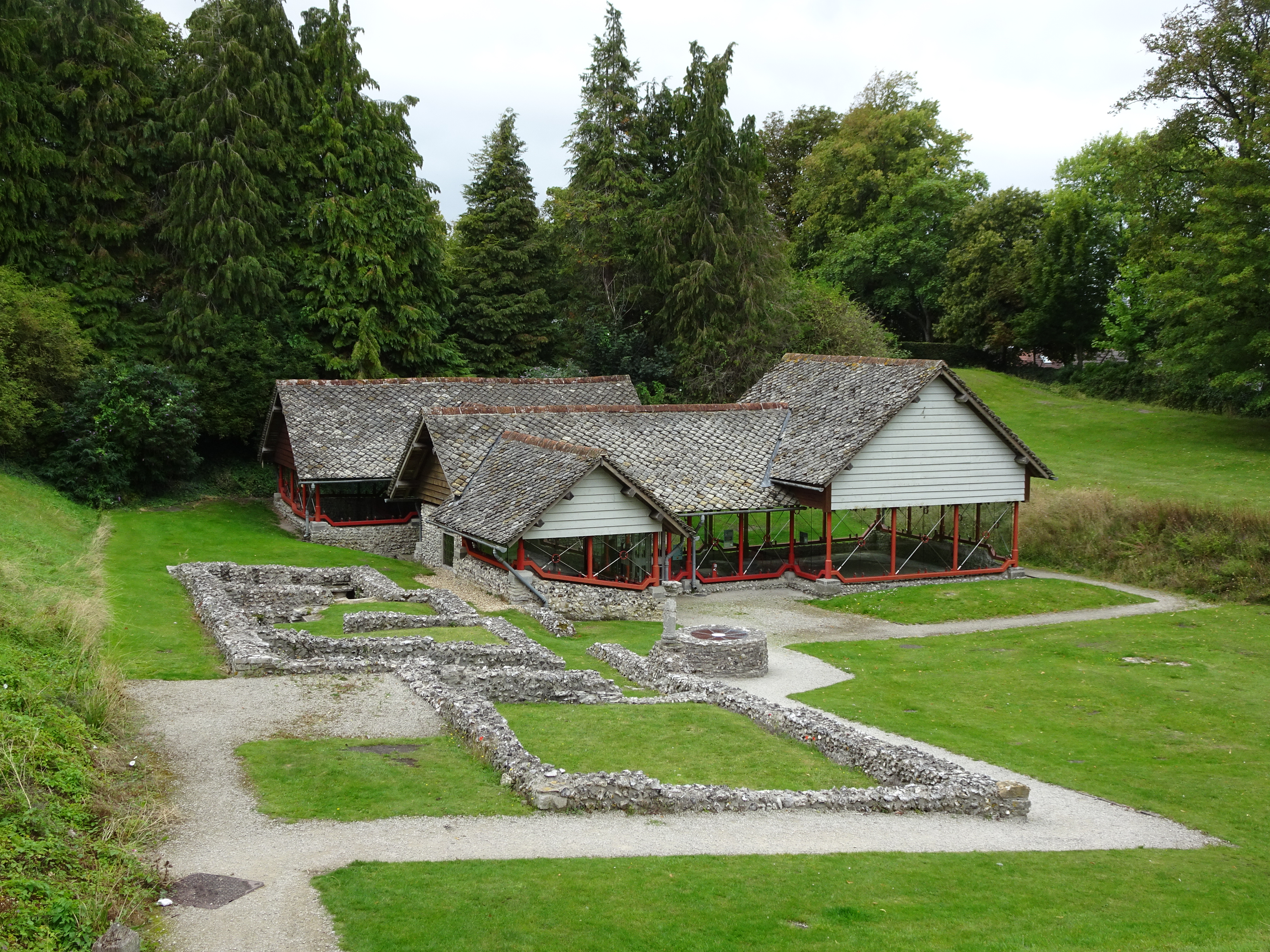
- The Roman Town House ruins

- Location within Dorset
- 50.7174°N 2.441°W
- Location: Colliton Park, Dorchester, Dorset

History
- Built: c. 307 AD

Site notes
- Area: Durnovaria
- Governing body: Dorset Museum
- Owner: Dorset Council

Listed Building – Grade I
- Official name: Roman House
- Designated: 8 May 1950
- Reference no.: 1210098

Scheduled monument
- Official name: Colliton Park Roman house
- Designated: 18 May 1938
- Reference no.: 1002721

The Roman Town House in Dorchester is a Roman ruin within Colliton Park, Dorchester, Dorset, England. Dorset County Council acquired Colliton Park in 1933 as the site for the construction of County Hall. The Town House was discovered in 1937/38 during an archaeological investigation carried out by the Dorset Natural History and Archaeological Society prior to the construction of the new building. Plans for County Hall were modified so that the Town House could be retained on site.

The Town House is a scheduled monument and a Grade I listed building. It is bounded on the north and west sides by North Walk and West Walk which are also designated as a scheduled monument having the remains of the Roman ramparts of the town just below surface level. The later wall on top is designated as a listed building.

Built around 307 AD and extended in 341 AD, the Town House has two principal ranges of rooms. The South Range comprising rooms 1–7 survives in the plan form of flint and stone walls on the grass covered site. The West Range comprising rooms 8–18 was mosaic floored. This range was re-excavated and provided with a steel and glass cover building with a stone tiled roof all perched on the original foundations between 1996 and 1999.

== Public access ==
The site is owned by Dorset Council and the grounds are free to visit. Dorset Museum manage events and provide access to the inside of the structure on tours.

== See also ==
- Durnovaria
