= Dorset Museum =

Museum in Dorchester, Dorset

Dorset Museum & Art Gallery
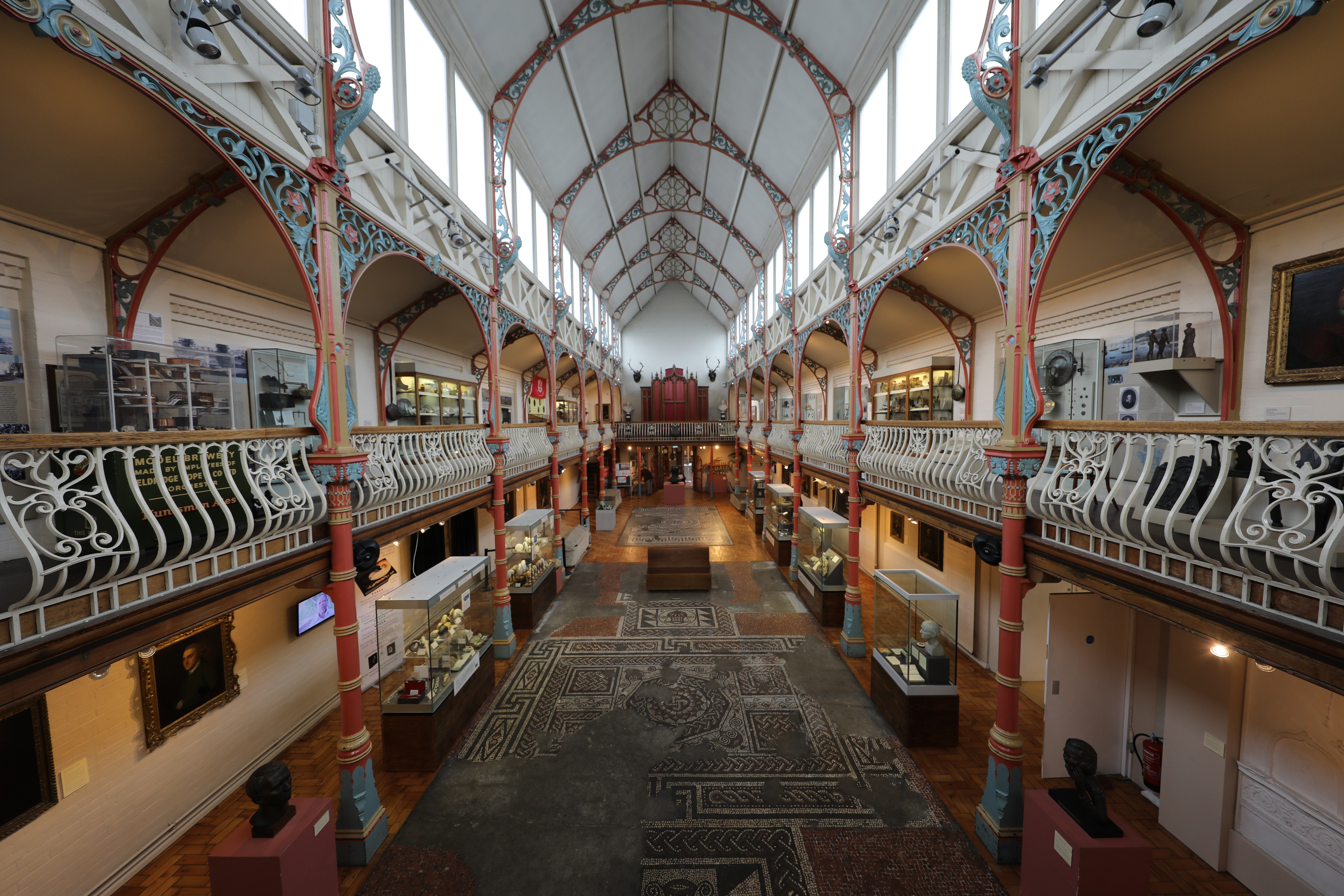
- Victorian interior of the Dorset Museum
- Established: 1846
- Location: Dorchester, Dorset
- Coordinates: 50°42′55.9″N 2°26′14.0″W
- Visitors: 47,000 (2016)
- Founder: Thomas Hardy and others.
- Architect: G. R. Crickmay and Son

Dorset Museum & Art Gallery (also known as the Dorset Museum) is located in Dorchester, Dorset, England. It was known as the Dorset County Museum until 2021. Founded in 1846, the museum covers the county of Dorset's history and environment. The current building was built in 1881 on the former site of the George Inn. The building was designed specifically to house the museum's collection and is in the neo-Gothic style.

The museum includes information and over 2 million artifacts associated with archaeology (e.g., Maiden Castle), geology (e.g., the Jurassic Coast), history, local writers (e.g. Thomas Hardy) and natural science. There are video displays, activity carts for children, and an audio guide. The collections include fossilised dinosaur footprints, Roman mosaics and original Thomas Hardy manuscripts.

== Museum ==
The museum was founded in 1846, and includes two significant collections, the archive of Thomas Hardy's works and fossils from the Jurassic Coast. The total collection extends to approximately four million items. The museum is owned by the Dorset Natural History and Archaeological Society. The museum was receiving approximately 45,000 visitors each year in 2014, which had increased to 47,000 visitors in 2016. TripAdvisor has awarded its Certificate of Excellence Award to the museum for four years in a row.

In 2016, the museum unveiled plans for a £13 million extension which would include a learning centre, cafe, library and shop, allowing the Dorset Natural History and Archaeological Society's full collection to hold together in one building. Three quarters of the funding for the extension was to be put forward by the Heritage Lottery Fund, allowing much more of the collection to be viewed. Without the extension, less than two per cent of the museum's collection was on display. Many items in the museum's collection had been stored at the nearby All Saints' Church.

The Dorset County Museum closed in October 2018 to undergo refurbishment and the construction of the extension. It reopened as the Dorset Museum on 29 May 2021, after the re-opening was delayed due to the COVID-19 pandemic. The cost of the work came to £16.4 million.

=== Exhibits ===
Thomas Hardy was one of the founders of the museum, and over seven thousand artefacts related to him are in the museum's collection, including an 1874 first edition copy of Far From The Madding Crowd. Other items in the Hardy archive include his handwritten manuscript for The Woodlanders, his sister's dress which is thought to be inspiration for the dress in Tess of the d'Urbervilles, and a reconstruction of Hardy's study.

The Ancient Dorset Gallery was opened by Julian Richards in November 2015 and includes Viking historical artefacts from a nearby burial site. Other artefacts include pre-historic flint hand axes, a Roman glass bowl and an Iron Age bronze mirror. The British Museum loaned three neolithic jadeite axes and mace heads to the museum to add to the display.

In July 2016, the museum opened a gallery dedicated to the work of William Barnes, telling the story of his humble roots to his legacy in poetry, novels and music. The gallery was opened by Bonny Sartin, lead singer of The Yetties.

Dippy, a plaster-cast of a dinosaur which was formerly displayed in the Natural History Museum, London, was exhibited at the museum from 10 February to 7 May 2018.

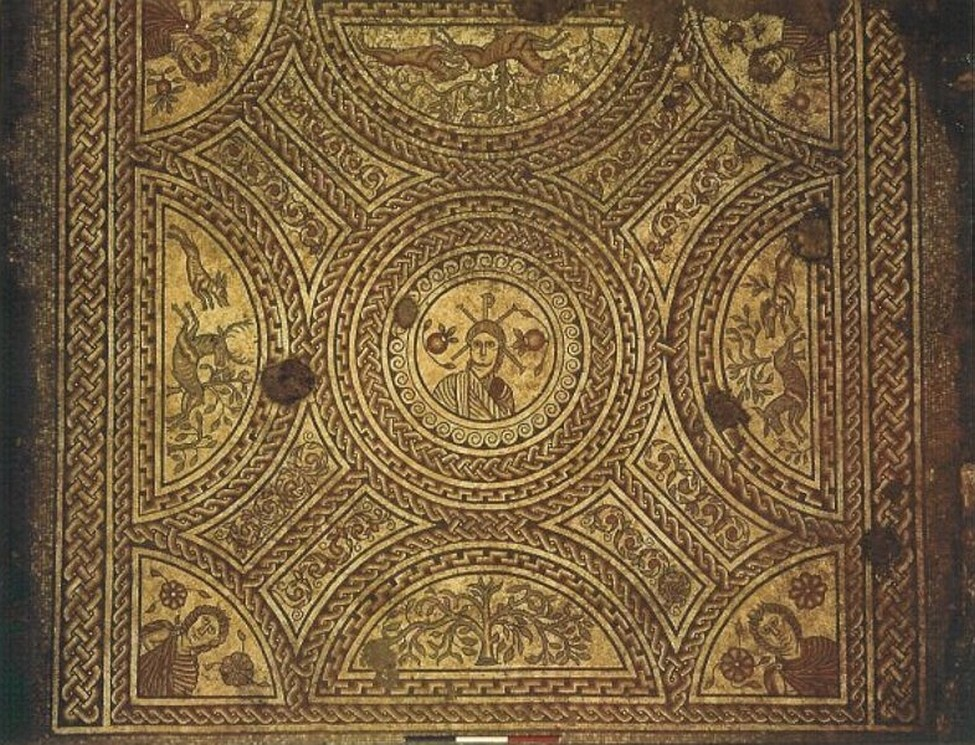
The complete intact Hinton St Mary Mosaic as displayed until 1997

On 2 August 2019, Hinton St Mary villagers and the Chair of the Dorset Unitary Authority were told at a closed-door meeting with the British Museum that the Hinton St Mary Mosaic would be partially returned to the Dorset County Museum. However, the head of Christ would not be returned, as the original would be “loaned to museums worldwide”. A replica would be given to the Dorset County Museum. No answer was given to one attendee’s question that: “Given that she [a British Museum curator] boasted the fact that the replicas they made were indistinguishable from the originals, surely it would make more sense to send the replica around the world and keep the original safe in Dorset?”

As of 2021, it was not clear whether the complete mosaic or only a part of it would be displayed in the Dorset Museum. The Association for the Study and Preservation of Roman Mosaics has stated: “the mosaic possibly contains the only known representation of Christ in an ancient pavement, it is of unique importance not just in Britain but in the context of the Roman Empire as a whole, and merits being displayed in its entirety. It is insufficient to show the central roundel in isolation, however important. The full meaning of the pavement can be appreciated only if the whole of it is visible, including the accompanying heads and figure scenes”.

In July 2022 the Blackmore Vale newspaper reported that "discussions are at an advanced stage with a view to bringing the important Roman artefact to the Dorset County Museum in Dorchester or another site."

== Building ==
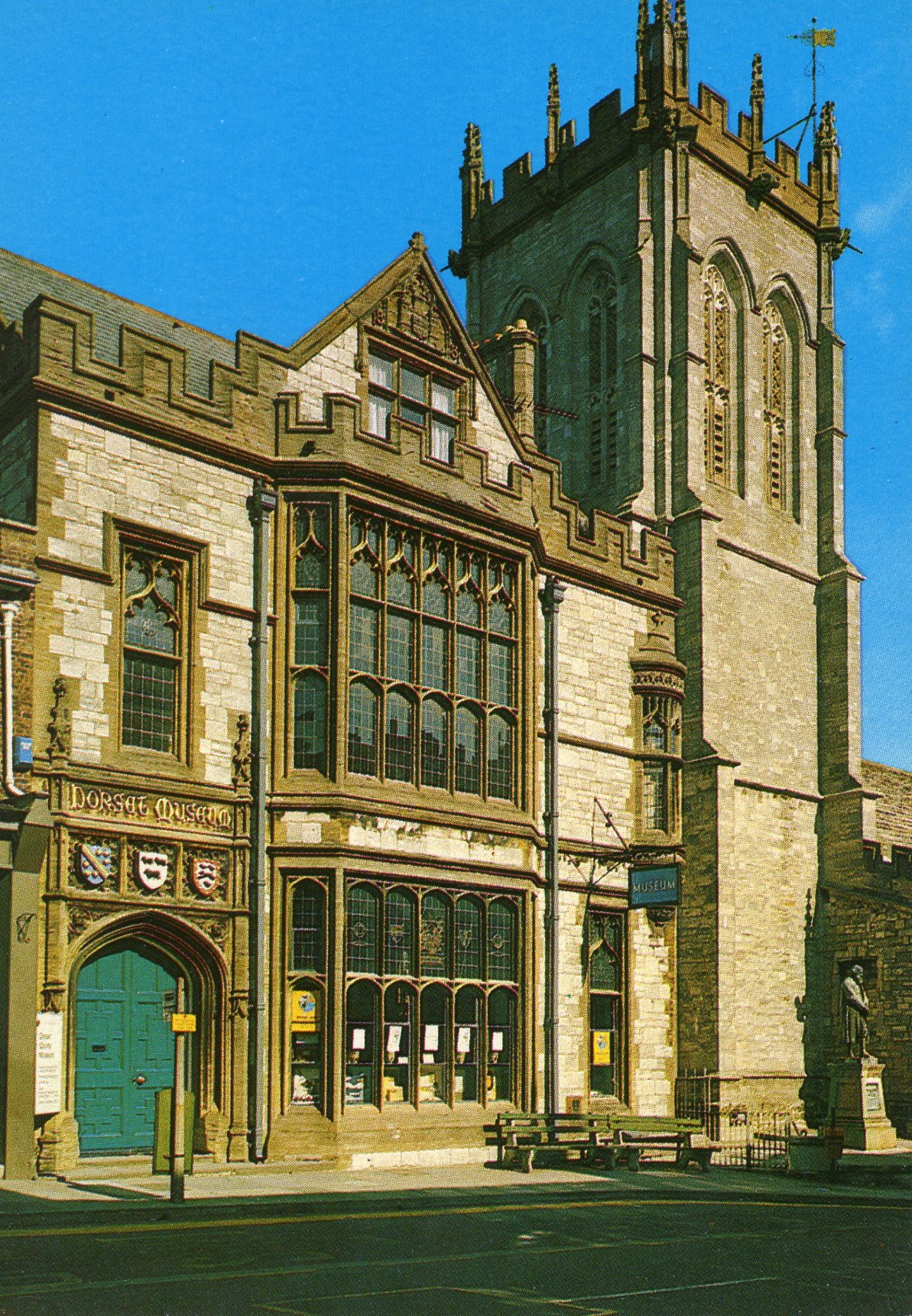
Museum entrance

Dorset Museum is on High West Street in Dorchester, Dorset. Built from Portland stone in approximately 1881, it was designed by architects G. R. Crickmay and Son from Weymouth. The building is two storeys high with a slate roof, it has two stringcourses on the gently sloped walls, with hood moulds over the windows and a crenellated parapet. The frontage includes a 2-storey bay with 7 transom windows. At the top of the bay there is a trefoil-headed panel displaying the Dorchester coat of arms. The cast-iron columns and the other metalwork in the aisled Victorian Hall were cast in Frome by Edward Cockey & Sons.

On the first floor there is an oriel window in the corner, above carved squinches. The door is to the left of the bay, displaying three coats of arms above. The building was designated Grade II listed building status on 8 May 1975, as part of a group with the nearby Shire Hall, Holy Trinity Church and St. Peter's Church. To the rear of the building, the museum also owns John White's rectory, where he resided whilst obtaining charters for the colonisation of Massachusetts.
