= All Saints Church, Dorchester =

Church in Dorset, England

All Saints Church
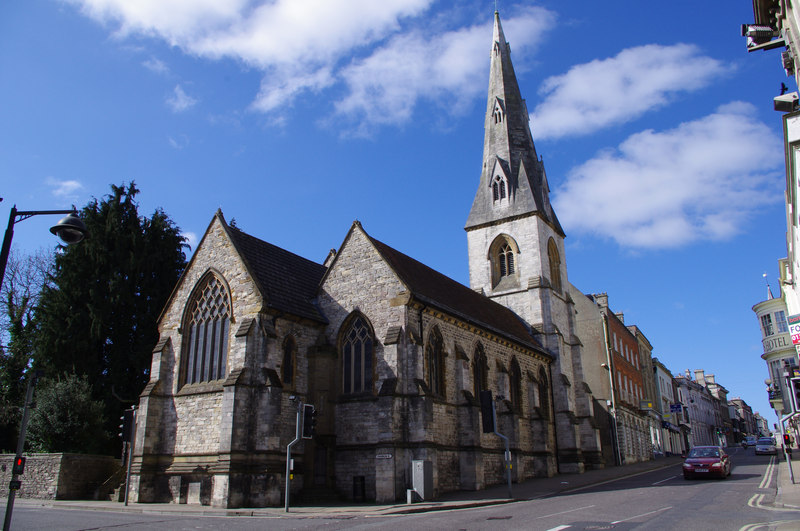
- All Saints Church

Religion
- Affiliation: Church of England
- Ecclesiastical or organizational status: Redundant
- Year consecrated: 1845

Location
- Location: Dorchester, Dorset, England
- Interactive map of All Saints Church
- Coordinates: 50.7154°N 2.4355°W

Architecture
- Architect: Benjamin Ferrey
- Type: Church

All Saints Church is a former Church of England church in Dorchester, Dorset, England. Designed by Benjamin Ferrey and built in 1843–45, the church is a Grade II* listed building.

== History ==
The site of All Saints is considered to have been occupied by a church since the Norman period, although the earliest records date to the 12th century. The original church is believed to have been destroyed by fire in 1613 and subsequently rebuilt. A decision was made to rebuild the church in the mid-19th century, to the designs of Benjamin Ferrey.

Demolition of the previous church began in August 1843 and the foundation stone of the new one laid by the Bishop of Salisbury, the Right Rev. Edward Denison, on 4 October 1843. The church's construction was carried out by local labour and assisted by the churchwarden Arthur Henry Dyke Acland, who also acted as "honorary architect".

The new church was consecrated by the Bishop of Salisbury on 7 May 1845. As further funds were required, the church's tower was unfinished and in need of a spire. Work later commenced on heightening the tower in 1851 and the spire was added in 1852.

All Saints was made redundant on 13 November 1970 and subsequently sold on 8 November 1972 to Dorchester Borough Council for use as an archaeological store for the Dorset County Museum.

== Architecture ==
All Saints is built of local limestone with Ham stone ashlar dressings and slate roofs, in the Early English style. It is made up of a four-bay nave, north and south aisles, chancel, vestry and north-west tower. Much of the church's 1843-45 furnishings were created and gifted by local tradesmen and other benefactors. The octagonal font was carved from a block of Portland stone by Mr. Gregory of Salisbury. The church contains an arcade of seven arches of Caen stone, which depict the commandments and texts of Holy Scripture by Mr. William Osmond of Salisbury.

From the earlier church there are preserved the elaborate tomb, with effigy, of Matthew Chubb (d. 1617) and the achievement of arms of Charles II.
