= Dorchester Area Schools Partnership =

- DASP logo
- Dorchester, Dorset; England

Information
- Motto: Getting it right by working together
- Established: 1992
- Gender: Coeducational
- Age: 4 to 18
- Enrolment: 4,000+
- Website: www.daspltd.com

The Dorchester Area Schools Partnership (DASP) is a group of 19 schools in the Dorchester area. It includes 13 first schools, three middle schools, an upper school (The Thomas Hardye School), an independent school and a learning centre.

== History ==
It was formed in 1992 to improve education for children in the Dorchester, Dorset area.

== DASP Student Voice ==
The DASP Student Voice is a representative body of the students across all DASP schools. Meetings are hosted by different schools every term and a wide range of issues are raised from the environment to sports and music. Most recently, they have been discussing the Student Voice Olympic Dreams Project led by The Thomas Hardye School and their partnership with The Doon School in India. Another project has been the DASP Olympic Torch Relay.
