= Dorset County Council =

Former local authority in England

Coordinates: 50°42′58″N 2°26′26″W

- Coat of arms

- Council logo

History
- Founded: 1 April 1889
- Disbanded: 31 March 2019
- Succeeded by: Dorset Council; Bournemouth, Christchurch and Poole Council

Elections
- Last election: 4 May 2017

Meeting place
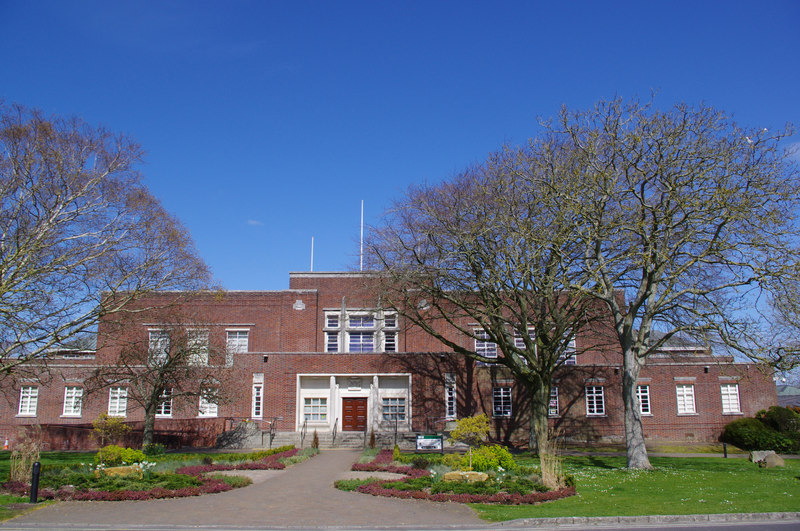
- County Hall, Dorchester

Dorset County Council was the county council of Dorset in England. It was created in 1889 and abolished in 2019. Throughout its existence, the council was based in Dorchester.

Bournemouth and Poole were made independent from the county council in 1997 when their councils became unitary authorities. On the abolition of the county council in 2019, the borough of Christchurch was merged with Bournemouth and Poole to become Bournemouth, Christchurch and Poole, and the rest of the county was placed under a new unitary authority called Dorset Council.

== History ==
Elected county councils were created in 1889 under the Local Government Act 1888, taking over many administrative functions that had previously been performed by unelected magistrates at the quarter sessions. The borough of Poole had been a county corporate since 1568, independent from the Sheriff of Dorset, but it was not considered large enough to take on county-level functions under the 1888 Act. Poole was therefore included in the county council's area, which was termed the administrative county, whilst remaining a county corporate for judicial purposes, retaining its own sheriff. (Note: The usual threshold adopted for a borough to be made a county borough was a population of 50,000; at the preceding census of 1881, the borough of Poole's population was 12,310.)

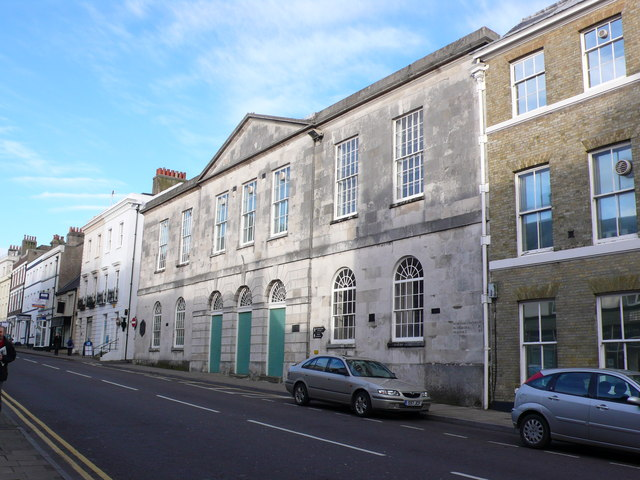
Shire Hall, Dorchester: Council's meeting place 1889–1955

The first elections were held in January 1889. The county council formally came into being on 1 April 1889, on which day it held its first official meeting at the Municipal Buildings in Dorchester. Henry Portman, 2nd Viscount Portman, a Liberal peer and former member of parliament for Dorset, was appointed the first chairman of the county council. Having held its first meetings at the Municipal Buildings in Dorchester, later in 1889 the council funded alterations to one of the courtrooms at Shire Hall, Dorchester, the county's main courthouse (completed 1797), allowing it to serve as the council's meeting place instead.

Local government was reformed in 1974 under the Local Government Act 1972. In terms of territory, Dorset gained Bournemouth (which had been a county borough since 1900), Christchurch, and part of the Ringwood and Fordingbridge Rural District from Hampshire. The enlarged Dorset was designated as a non-metropolitan county. The lower tier of local government was reorganised as part of the same reforms. Prior to 1974 it had comprised numerous boroughs, urban districts and rural districts. After 1974 the lower tier within the redefined Dorset comprised eight non-metropolitan districts: Bournemouth, Christchurch, East Dorset, North Dorset, Poole, Purbeck, West Dorset, and Weymouth and Portland.

In 1997 Bournemouth and Poole were both removed from non-metropolitan county of Dorset, when their borough councils were made unitary authorities, taking over the provision of county council functions in their areas. They remained part of the ceremonial county of Dorset for the purposes of lieutenancy.

=== 2015–19 local government reorganisation ===
In September 2015, the Dorset Echo reported plans to merge the borough and district councils of Poole, Bournemouth, East Dorset and Christchurch, creating one breakaway "super-council" across the south-eastern part of the county. A meeting of leaders and chief executives of all nine of Dorset's local authorities followed on 12 October 2015, "to discuss options for the future of local government in the area". That was followed by a series of public consultations and, ultimately, by statutory instruments for the reform of local government across Dorset, drawn up in May 2018. Under these proposals, dubbed "Future Dorset", all existing councils within the county would be abolished and replaced by two new unitary authorities. The first would be formed from the existing unitary authorities of Bournemouth and Poole which merged with the non-metropolitan district of Christchurch to create a unitary authority to be known as Bournemouth, Christchurch and Poole Council. The other was created from the merger of the existing non-metropolitan districts of Weymouth and Portland, West Dorset, North Dorset, Purbeck and East Dorset and was to be known as Dorset Council. The two new authorities came into being on 1 April 2019.

== Responsibilities for services ==
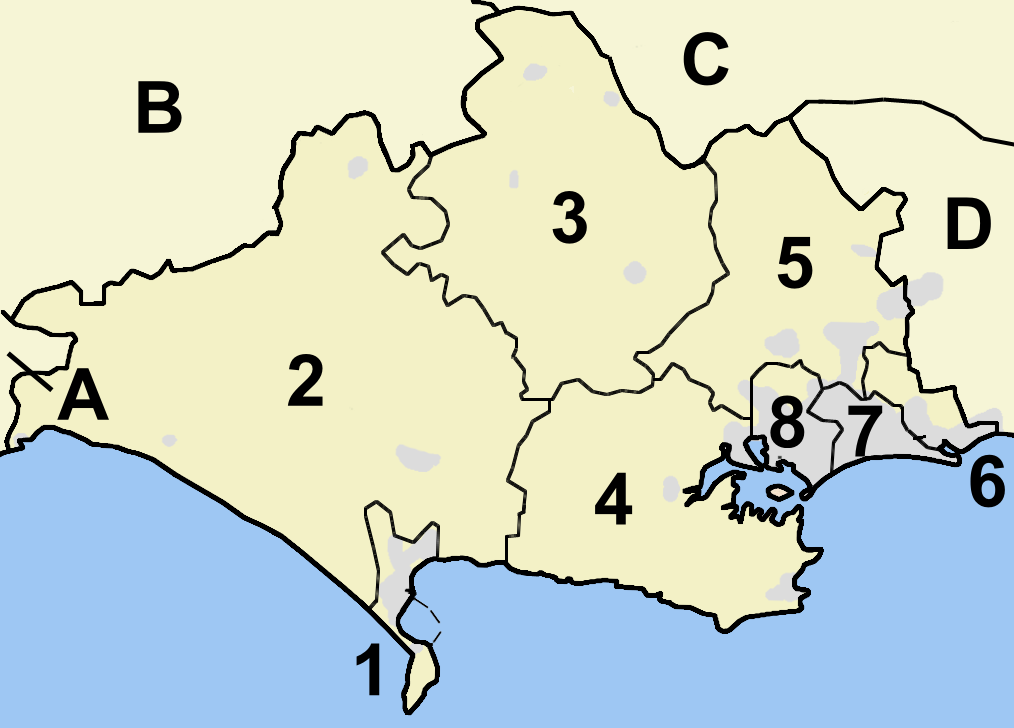
Map of Dorset's eight former districts. 1-6 were administered by Dorset County Council, but 7 and 8 were the unitary areas of Bournemouth and Poole, which were independent unitary authorities after 1997.

Dorset County Council's responsibilities included schools, social care for the elderly and vulnerable, road maintenance, libraries and trading standards.

The county council's area was also administered by six smaller authorities that have their own district or borough councils. The responsibilities of these councils included local planning, council housing, refuse collection, sports and leisure facilities, and street cleaning. The districts were further divided into civil parishes, which formed a third tier of local government.

== Political control ==
Political control of the county council from the reforms of 1974 until its abolition in 2019 was as follows:

Party in control	Years
Conservative	1974–1993
No overall control	1993–2001
Conservative	2001–2019

=== Leadership ===
The leaders of the council from 1987 until the council's abolition in 2019 were:

Councillor	Party	From	To
Colin Hodge	Conservative	1987	1993
Geoffrey Tapper	Liberal Democrats	1993	1997
Trevor Jones	Liberal Democrats	1997	2001
David Fox	Conservative	2001	2002
Tim Palmer	Conservative	2002	2006
Angus Campbell	Conservative	2006	May 2013
Spencer Flower	Conservative	16 May 2013	2 Dec 2014
Robert Gould	Conservative	3 Dec 2014	May 2017
Rebecca Knox	Conservative	18 May 2017	31 Mar 2019

Rebecca Knox served as the leader for the shadow authority created in 2018 to oversee the transition to the successor Dorset Council, but at the first meeting of the new council after it came into effect Spencer Flower was appointed leader.

== Premises ==
From 1889 until 1955 the council met at Shire Hall on High West Street in Dorchester (which also retained its primary function as a courthouse during that time). In 1910 the council bought the adjoining Stratton House (also known as Agriculture House) at 59-61 High West Street to serve as its main offices. Having outgrown Stratton House and Shire Hall, the council chose to build a new County Hall at Colliton Park. Work began on the new building in 1938 but was interrupted by the Second World War. The building was eventually completed in 1955.

== Coat of arms ==
Dorset County Council was granted a coat of arms on 21 February 1950. The arms were transferred to the successor Dorset Council following the 2019 local government reorganisation.

== See also ==
- List of articles about local government in the United Kingdom
