= St Peter's Church, Dorchester =

Church in Dorset, England

St Peter's Church
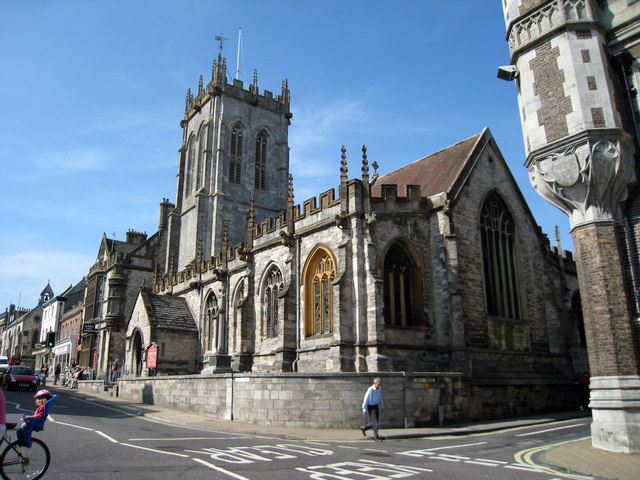
- St Peter's Church

Religion
- Affiliation: Church of England
- Ecclesiastical or organizational status: Active

Location
- Location: Dorchester, Dorset, England
- Interactive map of St Peter's Church
- Coordinates: 50.7155°N 2.4368°W

Architecture
- Type: Church

St Peter's Church is a Church of England church in Dorchester, Dorset, England. The majority of the church dates from the 15th century, with later alterations and extensions over the following centuries. The church has been a Grade I listed building since 1950.

== History ==
St Peter's is built of Portland and Ham stone ashlar, with roofs of slate, tile and lead. The oldest part of the church is the south doorway, which dates to the 12th century, providing indications of an earlier Norman church at the site. The majority of the building dates to circa 1420, including the west tower, nave, north and south aisles, chancel and south porch. A north and south chapel is of a later date during the same century.

In 1855–1856, the church underwent restoration, which included rebuilding the eastern end of the church and adding the north vestry. The gallery at the west end was removed and the organ loft relocated to the north aisle. The existing pews were replaced with open seats of deal and the reading pews replaced by a reading desk and lectern of oak. The architect and supervisor of the work was John Hicks of Dorchester, a pupil of whom was Thomas Hardy, and the builder John Wellspring of West Fordington. Work began in August 1855 and the church reopened for worship on 10 July 1856. During the period of its closure, Divine service was held in Dorchester's town hall.

The church underwent further restorations in the 20th century, including 1905, 1934, and 1961–1965, and the chancel was refurnished in 1894–1897. Internal features of note include two 14th-century effigies of recumbent knights in the south chapel, a 14th-century tomb chest in the chancel, the early 17th-century sarcophagus of Sir John and Lady Williams of Winterborne Herringston in the north chapel, and the late 17th-century monument with effigy of Denzil Holles in the north aisle. The reredos in the chancel was created in 1894–1897 by Charles Ponting.

== Gordon Memorial ==
From 1774 until 2023, the church contained a memorial plaque for John Gordon, an 18th-century plantation owner who helped to suppress a Jamaican slave rebellion called Tacky's War. Following criticism of the plaque's wording, the Parochial Church Council voted in 2020 to remove it. The plaque was removed on 19 May 2023 and loaned to the Dorset Museum. A replacement plaque will be installed in the future without mentioning the rebellion at all.
