= Shire Hall, Dorchester =

County building in Dorchester, Dorset, England

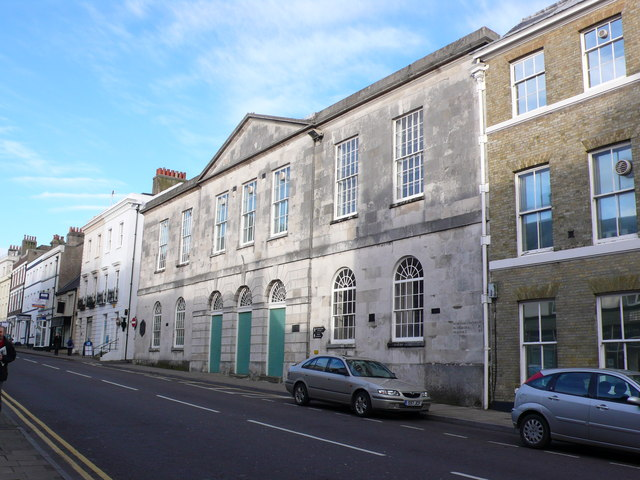
- The hall in 2008

- Location within Dorset
- 50.71537°N 2.439067°W
- Location: Dorchester, Dorset

History
- Built: 1797

Site notes
- Architect: Thomas Hardwick

Listed Building – Grade I
- Official name: The Shire Hall
- Designated: 8 May 1950
- Reference no.: 1119069

Shire Hall is an 18th-century courthouse in Dorchester, Dorset. The building was the centre of law, order and government, and served as the county hall for Dorset until 1955. It has been Grade I listed since 1950. Between 2018 and 2026, the hall was open to the public as the Shire Hall Historic Courthouse Museum.

== History ==
The courtroom at the Shire Hall.

The original shire hall was a structure which dated back to at least the 1630s but which had fallen into disrepair by 1769. The new building, which was designed by British architect Thomas Hardwick, was constructed between 1796 and 1797. Until the new building was completed, the court was based at the Antelope Hotel. It had been in the Oak Room at the Antelope Hotel that, in the aftermath of the Monmouth Rebellion, Judge Jeffreys held the Bloody Assizes on 5 September 1685.

One of the most famous trials held at the hall was that of the Tolpuddle Martyrs in 1834. The six Dorset agricultural labourers were arrested for swearing a secret oath as members of the Friendly Society of Agricultural Labourers, which they had formed to bargain for better wages. The rules of the society show it was clearly structured as a friendly society and operated as a trade-specific benefit society. On 18 March 1834, the Tolpuddle Martyrs were sentenced to penal transportation to Australia. The sentence sparked public outrage, resulting in a petition of 800,000 signatures demanding their release and a 100,000-strong demonstration in London. All were pardoned, on condition of good conduct, in March 1836, with the support of Lord John Russell, who had recently become home secretary. There is a plaque on the front of Shire Hall that commemorates 150 years since the trial.

English novelist and poet Thomas Hardy also served as a magistrate at Shire Hall. He had been made Justice of the Peace for the Borough of Dorchester from 1884, sitting in court on almost forty occasions from then to 1919. Hardy's experience as a magistrate provided inspiration for his writing.

Shire Hall was originally used as a facility for dispensing justice but, following the implementation of the Local Government Act 1888, which established county councils in every county, it also became the meeting place of Dorset County Council. Shire Hall continued to operate in its original capacity until 1955, when the new county hall and crown court was opened.

In June 2014, planning permission was granted to transform the Shire Hall into a new museum and visitor attraction. The project received £1.5m of funding from the Heritage Lottery Fund in 2015, with West Dorset District Council pledging a further £1.1m. Work commenced in 2016, while Christchurch-based company Pride Painting and Decorating Ltd began restoration work in March 2017. The Shire Hall Historic Courthouse Museum opened to visitors on 1 May 2018. The Duke of Gloucester unveiled a plaque, to celebrate the first anniversary of the opening of the museum, in May 2019.

On 8 October 2026, the Shire Hall closed as a museum after facing years of financial troubles. The trustees attributed "challenging economic conditions" and the increased costs of managing the building as the main reasons behind their decision.
