= The Thomas Hardye School =

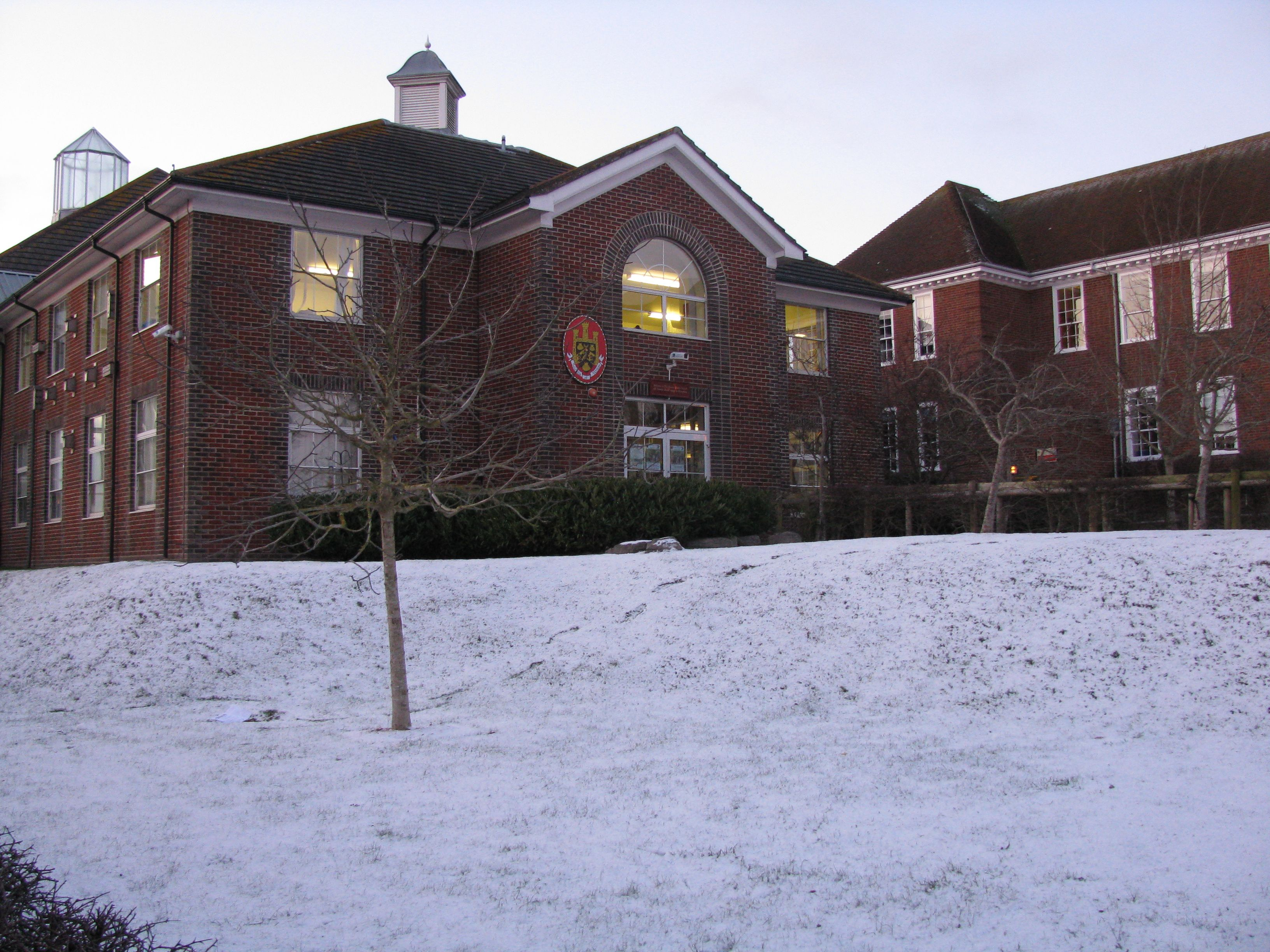
- The Thomas Hardye School central building, known as "The Spine"

Location
- Queen's Avenue; Dorchester, Dorset, DT1 2ET; England; 50°42′30″N 2°27′13″W

Information
- Type: Academy
- Motto: Scientia et Veritas - Knowledge and truth
- Established: 1579
- Sister school: The Doon School
- Department for Education URN: 137163 Tables
- Ofsted: Reports
- Headteacher: Nick Rutherford
- Gender: Coeducational
- Age: 13 to 18
- Enrolment: 2,000-2200
- Alumni: Hardyeans
- Former name: Hardye's School
- Website: Official website

The Thomas Hardye School is a secondary academy school in Dorchester, Dorset, England. It is part of the Dorchester Area Schools Partnership.

== History ==
=== Grammar school ===
The school is named after Thomas Hardye of Melcombe Regis and later Frampton. Hardye was a property owner who endowed the Dorchester Free School in 1579, ten years after its completion by the town. The 1569 building incorporated materials from another project referred to as 'Chubb's schoolhouse'. Via his brother Edmund, Hardye was an ancestor of novelist Thomas Hardy and Vice-Admiral Sir Thomas Hardy, 1st Baronet. His monument is on the south wall of St. Peter's Church, donated by his great-nephew the Puritan John Browne, Esq. of Frampton.

The Tudor grammar school offered free education to boys of the town and neighbourhood. The building was damaged in the fire of 1613, but the school was rebuilt in a considerably expanded form as part of the Calvinist organisation of the town under the regime of Revd. John White. An oak screen was installed into the reconstructed school, alleged (but only by a teacher at the school in a history of the school as late as 1995!) to have been salvaged from a Spanish Galleon, a most unlikely provenance.

The oak screen formed an integral part of the interior of the enlarged school, and was later moved between buildings and structures and remained part of the school until 2021. The school survived the doldrums of the 18th century, though at times having very few scholars, and struggled through the first half of the 19th century. The Charity Commission eventually closed it whilst it was rebuilt, reopening in 1883. It was known as Dorchester Grammar School following its re-opening (partly because it was no longer free) until approximately 1952, when the name Hardye's School was unofficially adopted, at the request of the Old Hardyeans as a reminder of the 16th century founder and links to the Hardye family.

The land had previously belonged to the Duchy of Cornwall, and the new building was formally opened in 1928 by the Duke of Cornwall, the then Prince of Wales, and remained the 'Hardye's' site until 1992. The Memorial Gates, dedicated in 1957, escaped demolition and were moved to the new Thomas Hardye School. Dorchester Grammar School for Girls was opened in around 1930, and Dorchester Modern School some time after the Education Act 1944. These schools formed the basis of the Thomas Hardye School.

=== Comprehensive ===
In 1980, Dorchester's secondary schools changed from the grammar school system (with three schools: separate boys’ and girls’ grammar schools and a mixed secondary modern) to comprehensive. Dorchester Grammar School for Girls combined with the female half of Dorchester Secondary Modern to form Castlefield School, based on the site of the Dorchester Secondary Modern School, while the boys of the Secondary Modern moved to the site of Hardye's School. The boys’ school had boarding facilities until 1982. The current school is a merger of the former Hardye's School (boys) and Castlefield School (girls) in 1990. The school moved to The Castlefield School site in 1992. The Hardye's School site was subsequently sold in 1995 and developed into housing.

On Friday 12 December 2008, the Prince of Wales and the Duchess of Cornwall visited the school to officially open the newly constructed library and sports hall.

=== Academy ===
On 1 August 2011, the Thomas Hardye School officially gained academy status under the UK Government scheme.

=== Cyber Attack ===
The school suffered a cyber attack on Sunday morning, 21 May 2023, affecting its servers and limiting use of the local network, associated materials and email. The attack was accompanied by a ransom demand. As of August 2023 the situation is unresolved and being investigated by the National Cyber Security Centre and the Police.

=== Headmasters ===
==== Thomas Hardye School ====
- Iain Melvin 1988–2010

== Admissions ==
The school provides government-funded education for children from Year 9 to Year 11, and takes them through GCSE and BTEC courses. It also has an integrated sixth form which takes pupils through A-Levels and AVCEs.

== Sixth form ==
The school has the largest integrated sixth form in the United Kingdom which shares teachers, resources and facilities with the 'lower school'.

The school has a partnership with local land-based college Kingston Maurward, offering practical alternatives to traditional A-levels.

== Model United Nations ==
The sixth form's Model United Nations club regularly attend BISMUN (Bath) and BGSMUN (Bristol), as well as hosting its own in the summer. It has also sent delegates to MUNs abroad.

== International ==
=== UNESCO status ===
In 2010, the school was awarded the UNESCO school status (one of just 54 in the UK) for the "global outlook of students" at the Hardye's. UNESCO aims to promote quality education as well as international perspectives in schools and such values as human rights, mutual respect and cultural diversity. The Thomas Hardye School has also been declared a 'World School' by the International Baccalaureate Organisation (IBO). Much of this recognition is thanks to a pupil who gained the title of UK Young Scientist of the Year.

=== BBC World Olympic Dreams ===
After Sports Voice submitted an entry into the BBC scheme (which sees a UK school twinned with a former school of a London 2012 Olympic athlete), the Thomas Hardye School was twinned with The Doon School, in the northern Indian city of Dehradun. The schools communicate regularly and are represented by a member of staff and pupil who arrange projects to exchange culture and prepare for the London 2012 Summer Olympics.

Along with all the schools in Dorchester, Thomas Hardye has been part of the DASP Olympic Torch Relay in celebration of the Olympics.

=== Partner schools ===
The school is twinned/associated with:

- The Doon School, India since 2010 through the BBC and British Council's Olympic Dreams initiative
- The Kabale School, Tanzania, has had major developments in its science programme thanks to financial help and visits from Hardye's
- Muhaka Primary School, Kenya was partly built by pupils from the Thomas Hardye School
- George Green's School, Tower Hamlets (London) have been linked with the school through Humanities projects
- Grace Secondary School, Sudan is funded by a Dorchester-based charity and supports by Hardyes
- Haberdashers' Hatcham College, Lewisham
- IES Mariano Baquero Goyanes, Murcia, Spain
- Lycée Alain Chartier, Bayeux, France.

== Facilities ==
The school has a theatre, refurbished in June 2022, and a library. The school uses the neighbouring artificial pitch and pools of the local sports centre operated by the not-for-profit trust 1610.

== Notable former pupils ==
- Orlando Bailey, Rugby Union Fly Half for Leicester Tigers.
- Bill Baker, Conservative MP from 1964 to 1974 for Banffshire
- Aaron Cook, a taekwondo athlete
- Roger Gale, Conservative MP since 1983 for North Thanet, and former BBC producer
- Prof John Gillingham, Professor of Neurological Surgery from 1963 to 1980 at the University of Edinburgh, and a pioneer of stereotactic surgery
- Leonard Haines, a British flying ace of the Second World War
- Roger Hearing, journalist and news presenter with the BBC World Service
- Paul Hillier, classical singer, conductor and musical director
- Rev Michael Perham, Bishop of Gloucester 2004-14
- Tom Prior, actor
- Thomas Ward, mathematician
- Simon Winchester, journalist
- Lloyd Hatton, Member of Parliament for South Dorset (UK Parliament constituency)

== See also ==
- List of English and Welsh endowed schools (19th century)
