= Thomas Hardy Statue =

Statue in Dorchester, Dorset, England

Coordinates: 50.7151°N 2.4415°W

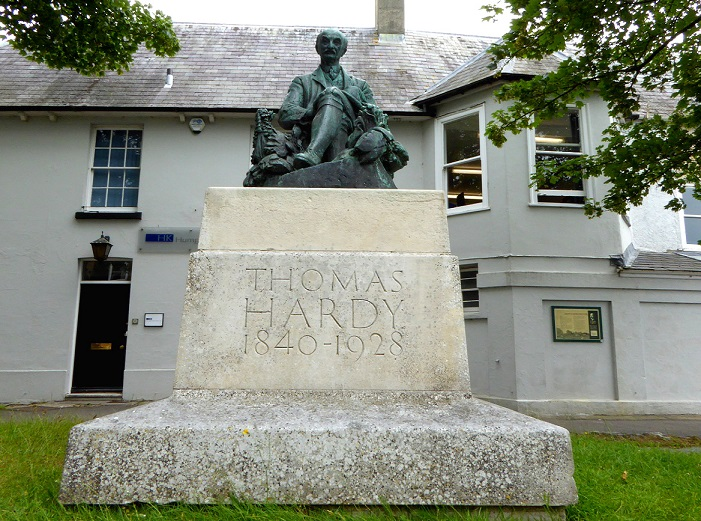
- Artist: Eric Kennington
- Year: 1931
- Type: Bronze figure with stone podium
- Designation: Grade II Listed Building
- Location: Dorchester

Thomas Hardy Statue is a statue of Thomas Hardy, located at Dorchester, Dorset, England. It was funded by public subscription to commemorate Hardy's life and works, three years after his death. Designed by Eric Kennington, the statue was unveiled on 2 September 1931 by Sir James Matthew Barrie. It was designated as a Grade II listed building in 1950.
