= Dorchester, Dorset =

County town of Dorset, England

Coordinates: 50.7154°N 2.4367°W

Dorchester
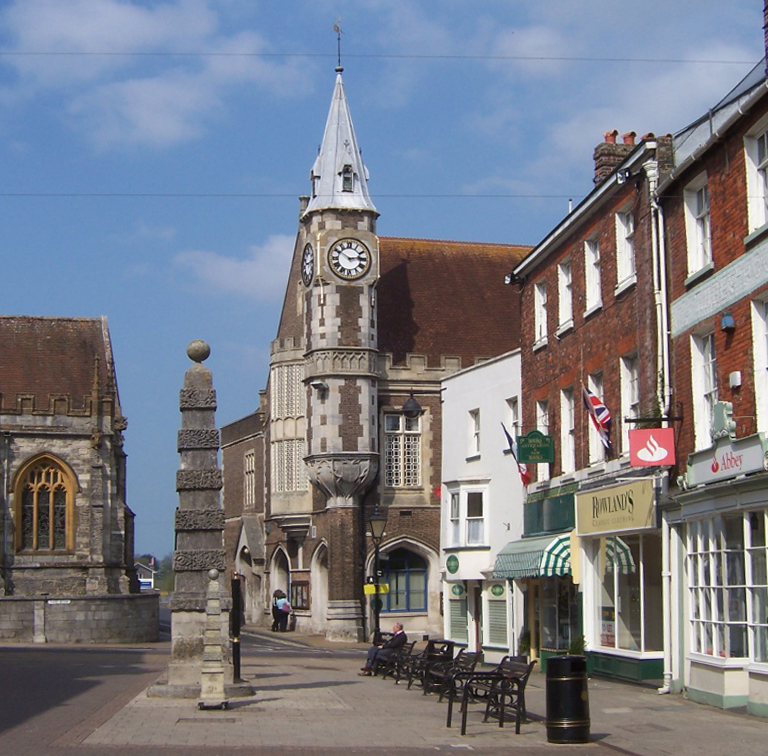
- Town Pump and Municipal Buildings

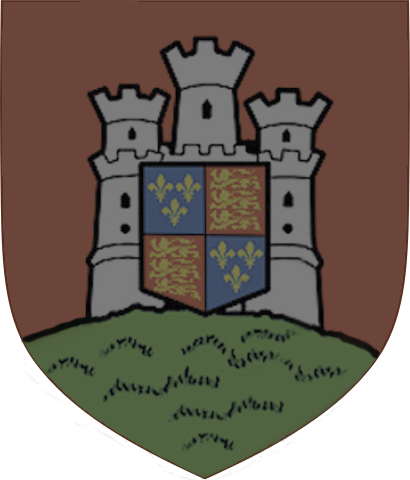
- Coat of arms of Dorchester

- Location within Dorset
- Population: 21,358 (2021 census)
- OS grid reference: SY690906
  - London: 116 miles (187 km) NE
- Civil parish: Dorchester
- Unitary authority: Dorset
- Ceremonial county: Dorset
- Region: South West
- Country: England
- Sovereign state: United Kingdom
- Post town: Dorchester
- Postcode district: DT1
- Dialling code: 01305
- Police: Dorset
- Fire: Dorset and Wiltshire
- Ambulance: South Western
- UK Parliament: West Dorset
- Website: Dorchester Town Council

Dorchester (UK: /ˈdɔːrtʃɪstər/ DOR-chist-ər, also /ˈdɔːrtʃɛstər/ DOR-chest-ər) is the county town of Dorset, England. It is situated between Poole and Bridport on the A35 trunk route. A historic market town, Dorchester is on the banks of the River Frome to the south of the Dorset Downs and north of the South Dorset Ridgeway that separates the area from Weymouth, 7 miles (11 km) to the south. Dorchester civil parish, which includes the experimental community of Poundbury and the suburb of Fordington, had a population of 21,358 in 2021.

The area around the town was first settled in prehistoric times. The Romans established a garrison there after defeating the Durotriges tribe, calling the settlement that grew up nearby Durnovaria; they built an aqueduct to supply water and an amphitheatre on an ancient British earthwork. During the medieval period Dorchester became an important commercial and political centre. It was the site of the "Bloody Assizes" presided over by Judge Jeffreys after the Monmouth Rebellion, and later the trial of the Tolpuddle Martyrs. As well as having many listed buildings, a number of notable people have been associated with the town. It was for many years the home and inspiration of the author Thomas Hardy, whose novel The Mayor of Casterbridge uses a fictionalised Dorchester as its setting.

It is a centre for employment, education, retail, leisure and healthcare for the surrounding area, with six industrial estates, the Dorset County Hospital, a weekly market, and a high school and further education college. The town has a football club and a rugby union club and several museums.

== History ==
=== Prehistory and Romano-British ===
Dorchester's roots stem back to prehistoric times. The earliest settlements were about 2 miles (3.2 km) southwest of the modern town centre in the vicinity of Maiden Castle, a large Iron Age hill fort that was one of the most powerful settlements in pre-Roman Britain. Different tribes lived there from 4000 BC. The Durotriges were likely to have been there when the Romans arrived in Britain in 43 AD.

The Romans defeated the local tribes by 70 AD and established a garrison that became the town the Romans named Durnovaria, a Brythonic name incorporating durn, "fist", loosely interpreted as 'place with fist-sized pebbles'. It appears to have taken part of its name from the local Durotriges tribe who inhabited the area.

Durnovaria was recorded in the 4th-century Antonine Itinerary and became a market centre for the surrounding countryside, an important road junction and staging post, and subsequently one of the twin capitals of the Celtic Durotriges tribe.

The remains of the Roman walls that surrounded the town can still be seen. The majority have been replaced by pathways that form a square inside modern Dorchester known as The Walks. A small segment of the original wall remains near the Top 'o Town roundabout.

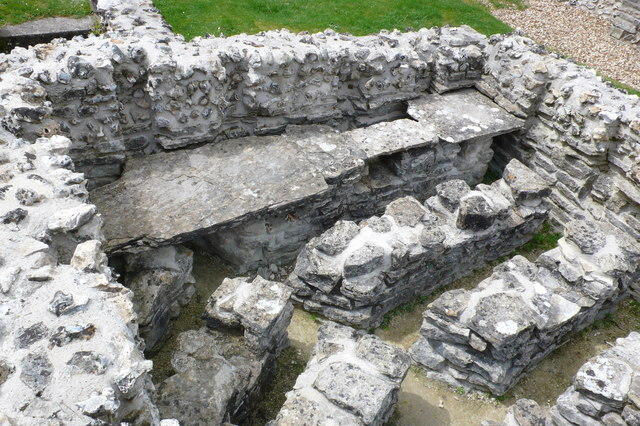
Part of the Roman town house, showing remains of its Hypocaust (underfloor heating system)

Other Roman remains include part of the town walls and the foundations of a town house near County Hall. Modern building works within the walls have unearthed Roman finds; in 1936 a cache of 22,000 3rd-century Roman coins was discovered in South Street.

Other Roman finds include silver and copper coins known as Dorn pennies, a gold ring, a bronze figure of the Roman god Mercury and large areas of tessellated pavement.

The Dorset Museum contains many Roman artefacts. The Romans built an aqueduct to supply the town with water. It was rediscovered in 1900 as the remains of a channel cut into the chalk and contouring round the hills. The source is believed to be the River Frome at Notton, about 12 miles (19 km) upstream from Dorchester. Near the town centre is Maumbury Rings, an ancient British henge earthwork converted by the Romans for use as an amphitheatre, and to the north west is Poundbury Hill, another pre-Roman fortification.

Little evidence exists to suggest continued occupation after the withdrawal of the Roman administration from Britain. The name Durnovaria survived into Old Welsh as Caer Durnac and later as Durngueir, recorded by Asser in the 9th century.

The area remained in British hands until the mid-7th century and there was continuity of use of the Roman cemetery at nearby Poundbury. Dorchester has been suggested as the centre of a sub-kingdom of Dumnonia or other regional power base.

=== Medieval ===
The first recorded raid of the Viking era took place at Isle of Portland near Dorchester around 790. According to a chronicler, Beaduheard, the king's reeve in Dorchester, assembled a few men and sped to meet them thinking that they were merchants from another country. When he arrived at their location, he admonished them and instructed that they should be brought to the royal town. The Vikings then slaughtered him and his men.

By 864, the area around Durnovaria was dominated by the Saxons who referred to themselves as Dorsaetas, 'People of the Dor' – Durnovaria. The original local name would have been Dorn-gweir giving the Old English Dornwary. The town became known as Dornwaraceaster or Dornwaracester, combining the original name Dor/Dorn from the Latin and Celtic languages with cester, an Old English word for a Roman station. This name evolved over time to Dorncester/Dornceaster and Dorchester.

At the time of the Norman Conquest in 1066, Dorchester was not a place of great significance; the Normans did build a castle but it has not survived. A priory was also founded, in 1364, though this also has since disappeared. In the later medieval period the town prospered; it became a thriving commercial and political centre for south Dorset, with a textile trading and manufacturing industry which continued until the 17th century. In the time of Edward III (1312–1377), the town was governed by bailiffs and burgesses, with the number of burgesses increasing to fifteen by the reign of James I (1566–1625).

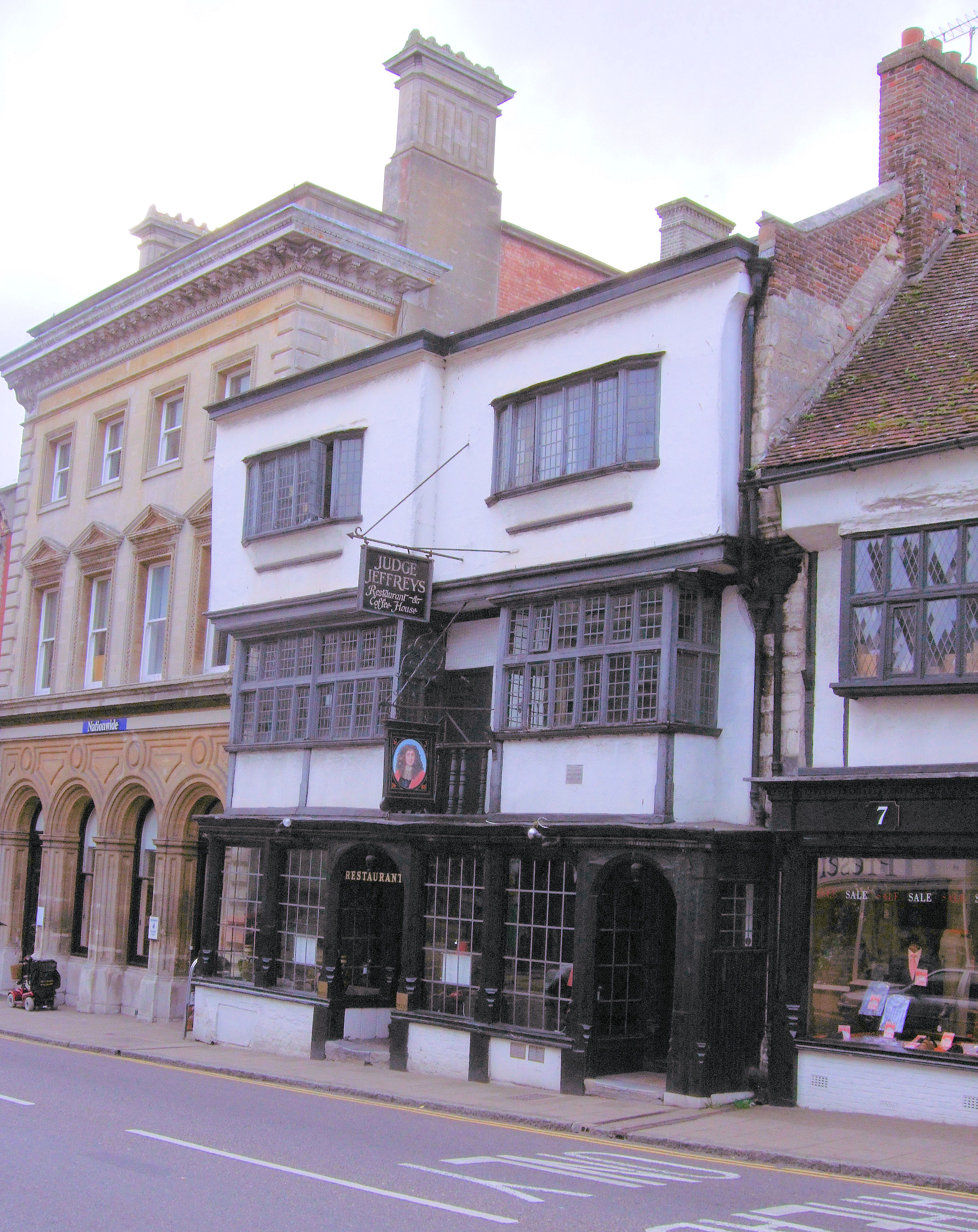
Judge Jeffreys' lodging house, now a restaurant, at 6 High West Street

=== Early modern ===
The town is populous, tho' not large, the streets broad, but the buildings old, and low; however, there is good company and a good deal of it; and a man that coveted a retreat in this world might as agreeably spend his time, and as well in Dorchester, as in any town I know in England.

— Daniel Defoe, A tour thro' the whole island of Great Britain (1724–26).

In the 17th and 18th centuries Dorchester suffered several serious fires: in 1613, caused by a tallow chandler's cauldron getting too hot and setting alight; in 1622, started by a maltster; in 1725, begun in a brewhouse; and in 1775, caused by a soap boiler. The 1613 fire was the most devastating, resulting in the destruction of 300 houses and two churches (All Saints and Holy Trinity).

Only a few of the town's early buildings have survived to the present day, including Judge Jeffreys' lodgings and a Tudor almshouse. Among the replacement Georgian buildings are many, such as the Shire Hall, which are built in Portland stone. The municipal buildings, which incorporate the former corn exchange and the former town hall, were erected in 1848 on the site of an earlier town hall, which was built in 1791 and had a marketplace underneath.

In the 17th century the town was at the centre of Puritan emigration America, and the local rector, John White, organised the settlement of Dorchester, Massachusetts. The first colonisation attempted was at Cape Ann, where fishermen who would rejoin the fishing fleet when the vessels returned the next year, tried to be self-sufficient. The land was unsuitable, the colony failed and was moved to what is now Salem. In 1628, the enterprise received a Royal Charter and the Massachusetts Bay Company was formed with three hundred colonists arriving in America that year and more the following year. For his efforts on behalf of Puritan dissenters, White has been called the unheralded founder of the Massachusetts Bay Colony. (Some observers have attributed the oversight to the fact that White, unlike John Winthrop, never went to America.)

In 1642, just before the English Civil War, Hugh Green, a Catholic chaplain was executed here. After his execution, Puritans played football with his head. The town was heavily defended against the Royalists in the civil war and Dorset was known as "the southern capital of coat-turning", as the county gentry found it expedient to change allegiance and to swap the sides they supported on several occasions. In 1643, the town was attacked by 2,000 troops under Robert Dormer, 1st Earl of Carnarvon. Its defences proved inadequate and it quickly surrendered but was spared the plunder and punishment it might otherwise have received. It remained under Royalist control for some time, but was eventually recaptured by the Parliamentarians.

In 1685 the Duke of Monmouth failed in his invasion attempt, the Monmouth Rebellion, and almost 300 of his men were condemned to death or transportation in the "Bloody Assizes" presided over by Judge Jeffreys in the Oak Room of the Antelope Hotel in Dorchester.

=== Modern ===
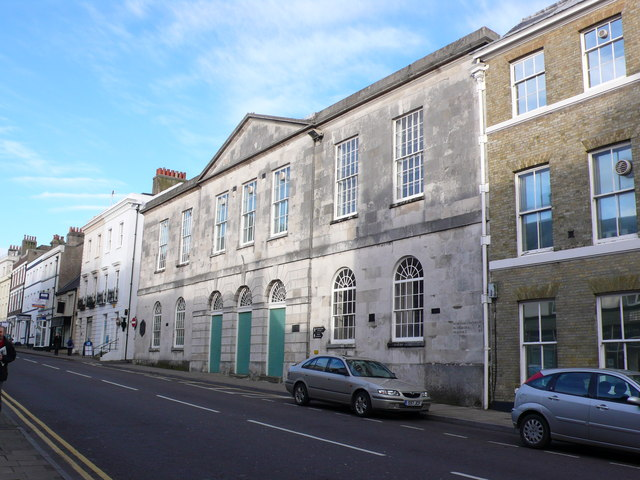
Shire Hall in High West Street, where the trial of the Tolpuddle Martyrs took place

In 1833, the Tolpuddle Martyrs founded the Friendly Society of Agricultural Labourers. Trade unions were legal but because the members swore an oath of allegiance, they were arrested and tried in the Shire Hall. Beneath the courtroom are cells where the prisoners were held while awaiting trial. Dorchester Prison was constructed in the town during the 19th century and was used for holding convicted and remanded inmates from the local courts until it closed in December 2013. Plans have since been made to erect 189 dwellings and a museum on the site.

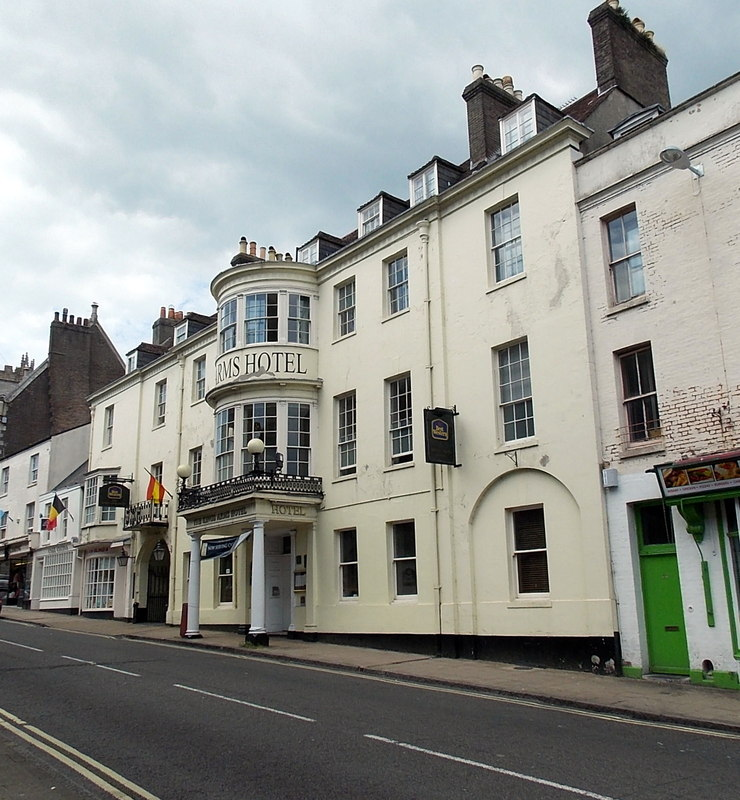
The King's Arms coaching inn, High East Street

Dorchester remained a compact town within the boundaries of the old town walls until the latter part of the 19th century because all land immediately adjacent to the west, south and east was owned by the Duchy of Cornwall. The land composed the Manor of Fordington. The developments that had encroached onto it were Marabout Barracks, to the north of Bridport Road, in 1794, Dorchester Union Workhouse, to the north of Damer's Road, in 1835, the Southampton and Dorchester Railway and its station east of Weymouth Avenue, in 1847, the Great Western Railway and its station to the south of Damer's Road, in 1857, the waterworks, to the north of Bridport Road, in 1854, a cemetery, to the west of the new railway and east of Weymouth Avenue, in 1856, and a Dorset County Constabulary police station in 1860, west of the Southampton railway, east of Weymouth Avenue and north of Maumbury Rings.

The Duchy land was farmed under the open field system until 1874 when it was enclosed – or consolidated – into three large farms by the landowners and residents. The enclosures were followed by a series of key developments for the town: the enclosing of Poundbury hillfort for public enjoyment in 1876, the 'Fair Field' (new site for the market, off Weymouth Avenue) in 1877, the Recreation Ground (also off Weymouth Avenue) opening in 1880, and the Eldridge Pope Brewery of 1881, adjacent to the railway line to Southampton. Salisbury Field was retained for public use in 1892 and land was purchased in 1895 for the formal Borough Gardens, between West Walks and Cornwall Road. The clock and bandstand were added in 1898.

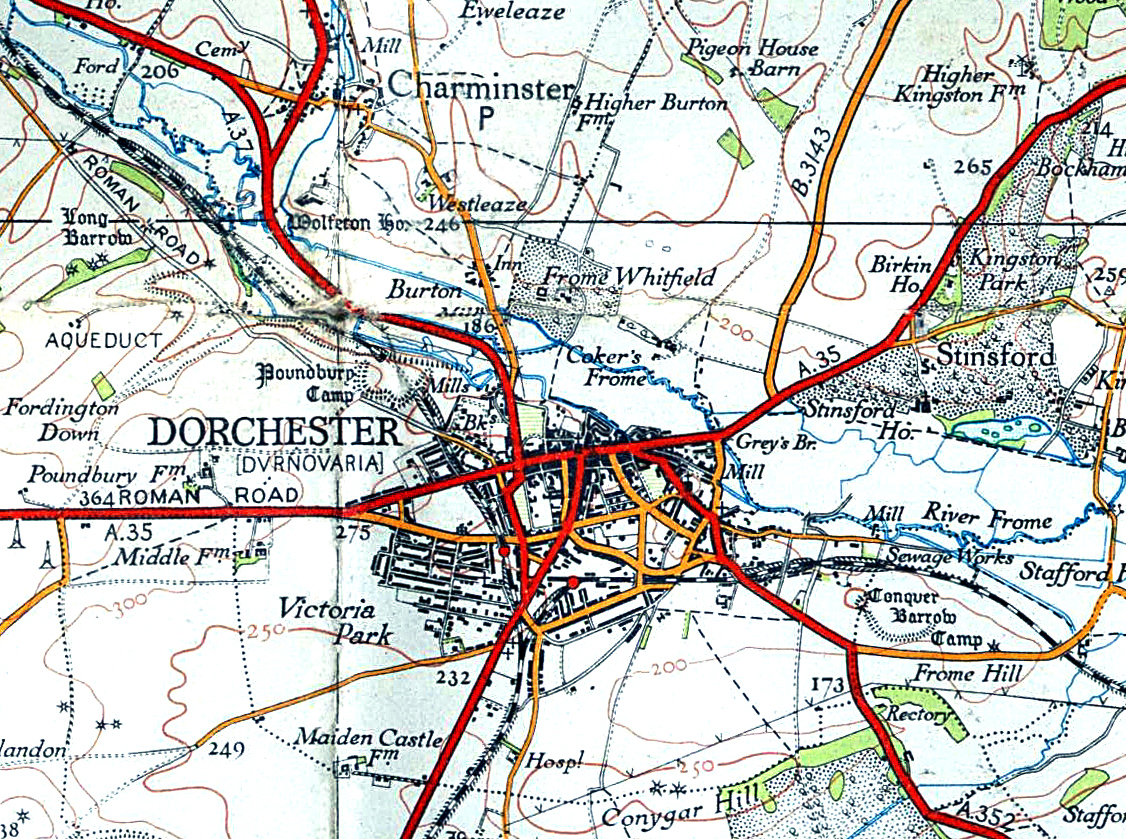
A 1937 map of Dorchester

A permanent military presence was established in the town with the completion of the Depot Barracks in 1881. The High West Street drill hall was created, by converting a private house, around the same time.

Land was developed for housing outside the walls including the Cornwall Estate, between the Borough Gardens and the Great Western Railway from 1876 and the Prince of Wales Estate from 1880. Land for the Victoria Park Estate was bought in 1896 and building began in 1897, Queen Victoria's Diamond Jubilee year. The lime trees in Queen's Avenue were planted in February 1897.

The Dorchester borough lost only two civilian lives to enemy action during the Second World War.

Poundbury is the western extension of the town, constructed since 1993 according to urban village principles on Duchy of Cornwall land owned by Charles III. Being developed over 25 years in four phases, it will eventually have 2,500 dwellings and a population of about 6,000. Charles was involved with the development's design.

Dorchester became Dorset's first Official Transition Initiative in 2008 as part of the Transition Towns concept. Transition Town Dorchester is a community response to the challenges and opportunities of peak oil and climate change.

== Government ==
Dorchester is represented by two tiers of government, Dorchester Town Council and Dorset Council, both of which are based within the town. Dorchester elects five councillors to Dorset Council from three wards (Dorchester East, Dorchester Poundbury and Dorchester West) There are four electoral wards for Dorchester Town Council (North, South, East and West). Historically, Dorchester was a municipal borough from 1836 to 1974, and then part of West Dorset district from its creation in 1974 to its abolition in 2019.

For elections to parliament, Dorchester is in the West Dorset constituency. Historically it was in the Dorchester constituency from 1295 to 1868, and then the South Dorset constituency until 1918.

The town's coat of arms depicts the old castle that used to stand on the site of the former prison and its taken from the town seal, which pre-dates the Arms. On the town seal, the royal purple background represents Dorchester's status as part of the monarch's private estate, a position held since before the Domesday Book was published. The shield is divided into quarters, two depicting lions and two fleur-de-lis, copied from the shields of the troops from Dorset who took part in the Battle of Agincourt in 1415. The fleur-de-lis have a scattered arrangement which shows that permission for the armorial bearings was given before 1405, after which date the rights were varied by King Henry VI. The inscription Sigillum Bailivorum Dorcestre translates as 'Seal of the Bailiffs of Dorchester'. The mayor has a similar seal of office, but this has the inscription Dorcestriensis Sig: Maioris.

In 2011, Dorchester was one of more than 20 towns across the country to apply for city status to mark the Diamond Jubilee of Elizabeth II, although in March 2012 it was revealed that Dorchester's bid had been unsuccessful.

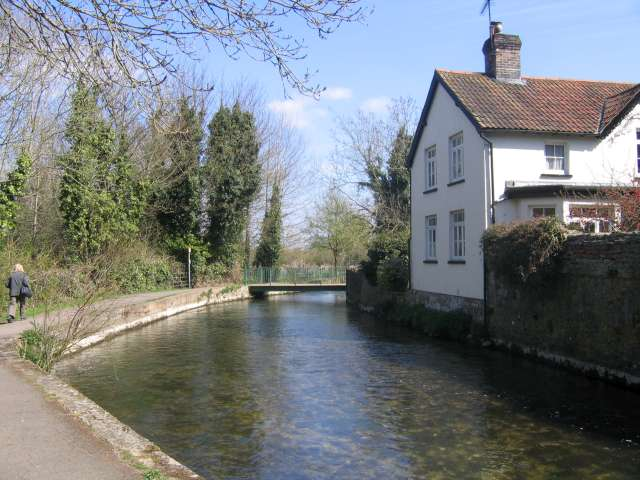
The River Frome on the edge of the town

== Geography ==
Dorchester town centre is sited about 55 to 80 metres (180 to 262 ft) above sea-level on gently sloping ground beside the south bank of the River Frome. Measured directly, it is about 7 miles (11 km) north of Weymouth, 18 miles (29 km) SSE of Yeovil in Somerset, and 20 miles (32 km) west of Poole. The town's built-up area extends south, west and southeast of the town centre; to the north and northeast growth is restricted by the floodplain and watermeadows of the river.

The land immediately south and west of the town is part of the Dorset National Landscape area. It is traversed by the South Dorset Ridgeway, part of the South West Coast Path. There are over five hundred ancient monuments along the chalk hills that form the ridgeway, including barrows, stone circles and hillforts; many archaeological finds from the area are on view at the Dorset Museum in Dorchester.

The geology of the town comprises bedrock formed in the Coniacian, Santonian and Campanian ages of the Late Cretaceous epoch, overlain in places by more recent Quaternary drift deposits. The bedrock is chalk of various formations. The drift deposits comprise a cap of clay-with-flints on the western edge of the town around Poundbury, alluvium in the river's floodplain, and several narrow ribbons of poorly stratified head deposits, found particularly around the town's northeastern and southwestern boundaries but also elsewhere.

== Economy ==
In 2012 there were 17,500 people working in Dorchester, 51% of whom were working full-time. 57% of jobs were in public administration, education and health, 18% were in professional and market services (including finance and ICT), 17% were in distribution, accommodation and food, 4% were in production and 2% in construction. The unemployment rate in July 2014 was 0.9% of residents aged 16–64.

Dorchester has six industrial estates: The Grove Trading Estate (7.1 ha or 18 acres), Poundbury Trading Estate (5 ha or 12 acres), Marabout Barracks (2 ha or 4.9 acres), Great Western Centre (1.4 ha or 3.5 acres), Railway Triangle (1.4 ha or 3.5 acres) and Casterbridge Industrial Estate (1.1 ha or 2.7 acres). The estates mostly house light industrial units, wholesalers and the service sector. Significant employers for residents in the town include AEA Technology, BAeSEMA Ltd, Dorset County Council, Dorset County Hospital NHS Foundation Trust, Goulds Ltd, Henry Ling Ltd, Kingston Maurward College, Tesco, and Winterbourne Hospital.

In 2008 the Dorchester BID, a business improvement district, was set up to promote the town and improve the trading environment for town centre businesses. Local traders were overwhelmingly in favour of the decision, with 84% voting in favour at the February 2008 ballot. The BID is funded by a levy on the businesses in the town. The BID lasts initially for five years, and between 2013 and 2018 the projects being undertaken include business support, security projects, town promotion, the provision of green spaces and making the town more visually attractive. In June 2018 the Dorchester BID was successful in being voted in for a second term.

The catchment population for major food retail outlets in Dorchester is 38,500 (2001 estimate) and extends eight miles west, north and east of the town, and two miles south. The Brewery Square redevelopment project now includes retail outlets, residential units, bars, restaurants, hotel and cultural facilities. The regeneration of Dorchester South railway station will make it the UK's first solar powered railway station. The Charles Street development has had a first phase completed that includes a library, adult education centre and offices for Dorset Council. Proposals for the development have included 23 shops, an underground car park, hotel and affordable housing.

== Demography ==
In the 2011 census Dorchester civil parish had 8,996 dwellings, 8,449 households and a population of 19,060, with 48.35% of residents being male and 51.65% being female. 17% of residents were under the age of 16 (compared to 18.9% for England as a whole), and 22.4% of residents were age 65 or older (compared to 16.4% for England as a whole).

Census population of Dorchester parish
Census	Population	Female	Male	Households	Source
1921	9,956				
1931	10,030				
1951	11,622				
1961	12,263				
1971	13,740				
1981	14,050				
1991	15,100				
2001	16,171	8,416	7,755	7,092	
2011	19,060	9,845	9,215	8,449	
2021	21,358	11,252	10,106	10,001	

== Culture ==
=== Writers ===
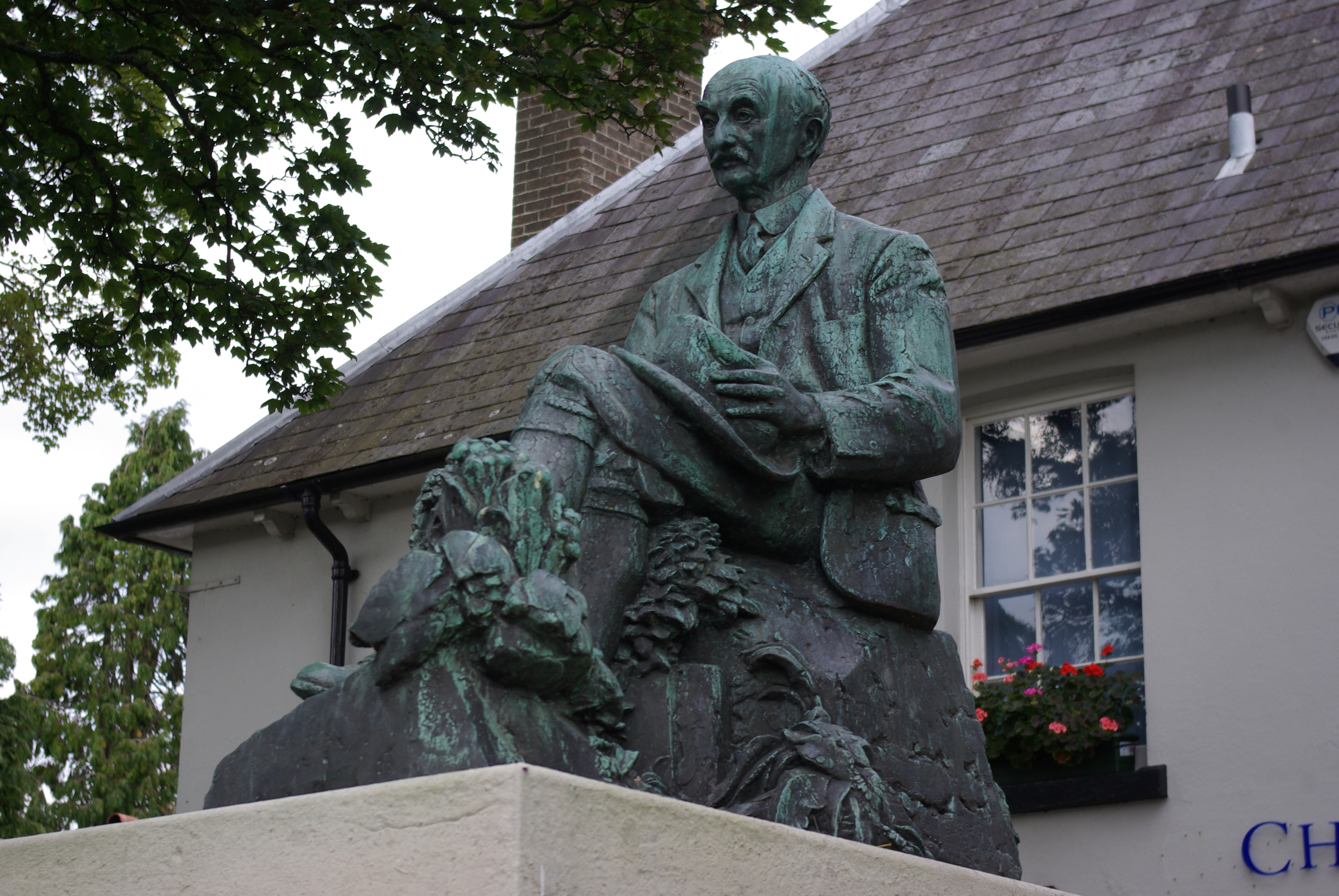
Statue of Thomas Hardy beside The Grove, north of High West Street

Novelist and poet Thomas Hardy based the fictional town of Casterbridge on Dorchester, and his novel The Mayor of Casterbridge is set there. Hardy's childhood home is to the east of the town, and his town house, Max Gate, is owned by the National Trust and open to the public. Hardy is buried in Westminster Abbey, but his heart was removed and buried in Stinsford.

William Barnes, the West Country dialect poet, was Rector of Winterborne Came, a hamlet near Dorchester, for 24 years until his death in 1886, and ran a school in the town. There is a statue of Hardy and one of Barnes in the town centre; Barnes outside St. Peter's Church, and Hardy's beside the Top o' Town crossroads.

John Cowper Powys's novel Maiden Castle (1936) is set in Dorchester and Powys intended it to be "a Rival of the Mayor of Casterbridge. Powys had lived in Dorchester as a child, between May 1880 and Christmas 1885, when his father was a curate there. Then, after returning from America in June 1934, he had lived at 38 High East Street, Dorchester, from October 1934 until July 1935, when he moved to Wales. The building is commemorated with a plaque erected by the Dorchester Heritage Committee, but giving the date of his residence as 1936.

=== Arts and museums ===
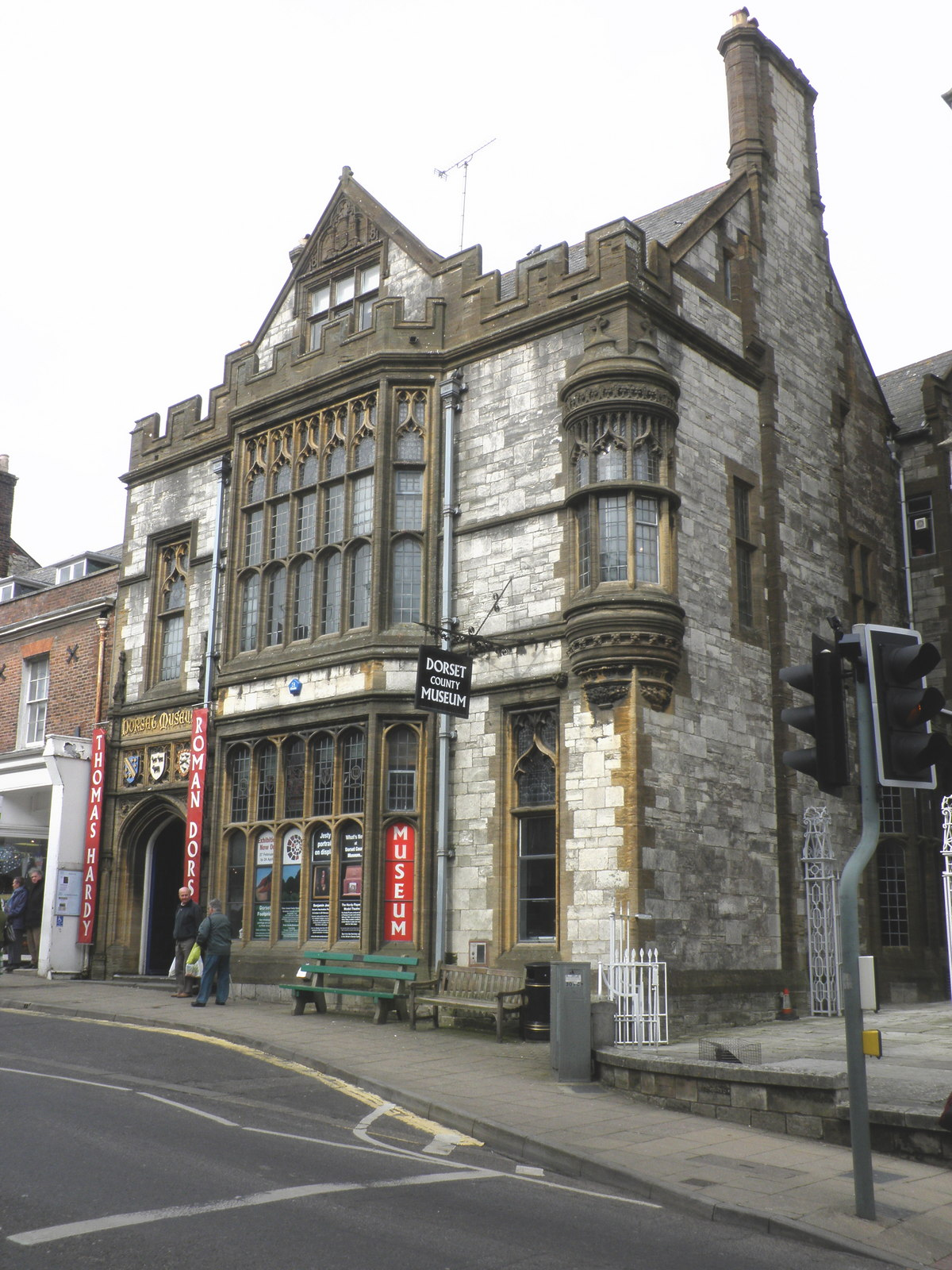
Dorset Museum

Dorchester Arts, based in a former school building, runs a seasonal programme of music, dance and theatre events, and participatory arts projects for socially excluded groups. Dorchester Arts is an Arts Council 'National Portfolio organisation'. Dorchester Arts has been resident at the corn exchange since 2015.

Dorchester museums include the Roman Town House, the Dinosaur Museum, the Terracotta Warriors Museum, the Dorset Teddy Bear Museum, the Keep Military Museum, Dorset Museum, and the Tutankhamun Exhibition. All of these museums took part in the "Museums at Night" event in May 2011 in which museums across the UK opened after hours. The Shire Hall which contains the court where the Tolpuddle Martyrs were held and tried opened as a museum in 2018. The Durnovaria Silver Band is based in Fordington Methodist Church Hall.

British sculptor Elisabeth Frink lived and worked in Dorset at her Woolland studio from 1976 until her death in 1993. Examples of her work can be seen across Dorchester, from the Dorset Martyrs Memorial sculpture to the Frink Collection at the Dorset Museum.

== Notable buildings ==
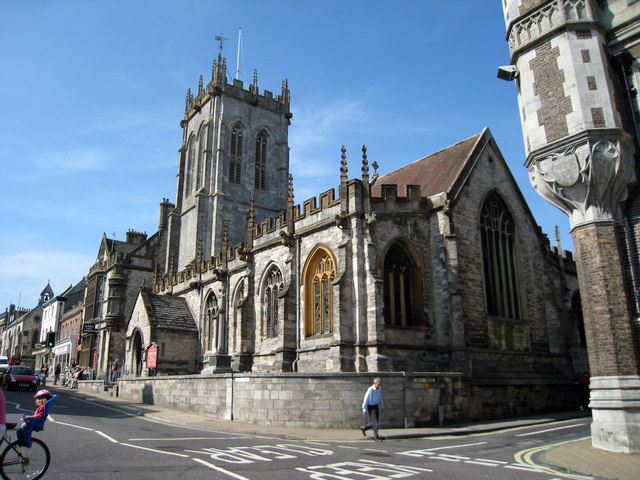
Church of St Peter, Dorchester

Within Dorchester parish there are 293 structures that are listed by Historic England for their historic or architectural interest, including five that are listed Grade I and sixteen that are Grade II*. The Grade I structures are the Church of St George on Fordington High Street, the Church of St Peter on High West Street, Max Gate on Syward Road, the Roman town house on Northernhay, and Shire Hall on High West Street.

The Church of St George has a late-11th-century south door that has a Caen stone tympanum with a realistic carved representation of St George surrounded by soldiers, said to depict the miracle of his appearance at the Battle of Antioch. The south aisle and the north part of the porch date from the 12th century. The Church of St Peter mostly dates from 1420 to 1421, with a 12th-century south doorway reset into it. There are many notable monuments, including two 14th-century effigies and a 14th-century tomb chest. Thomas Hardy contributed to the addition of the vestry and chancel in 1856–7.

Max Gate was designed by Thomas Hardy in the Queen Anne style, and was his home until his death in 1928. It was built in 1885. The remains of the Roman house north of county hall date from the early 4th century, with later 4th-century enlargements. It has a hypocaust heating system and mosaic pavements. It is the only visible Roman town house in Britain. The current Shire Hall building was designed by Thomas Hardwick and built in Portland stone ashlar in 1797. It replaced a previous structure that had fallen into disrepair.

A tablet commemorates the sentencing of the Tolpuddle Martyrs here in 1834. The building housed the Crown Court until 1955; Thomas Hardy was a magistrate here and his experience provided inspiration for his writing. The building has changed little since the 19th century, and in 2014 planning permission was granted to transform it into a heritage centre and tourist attraction, to open in 2017.

== Education and healthcare ==
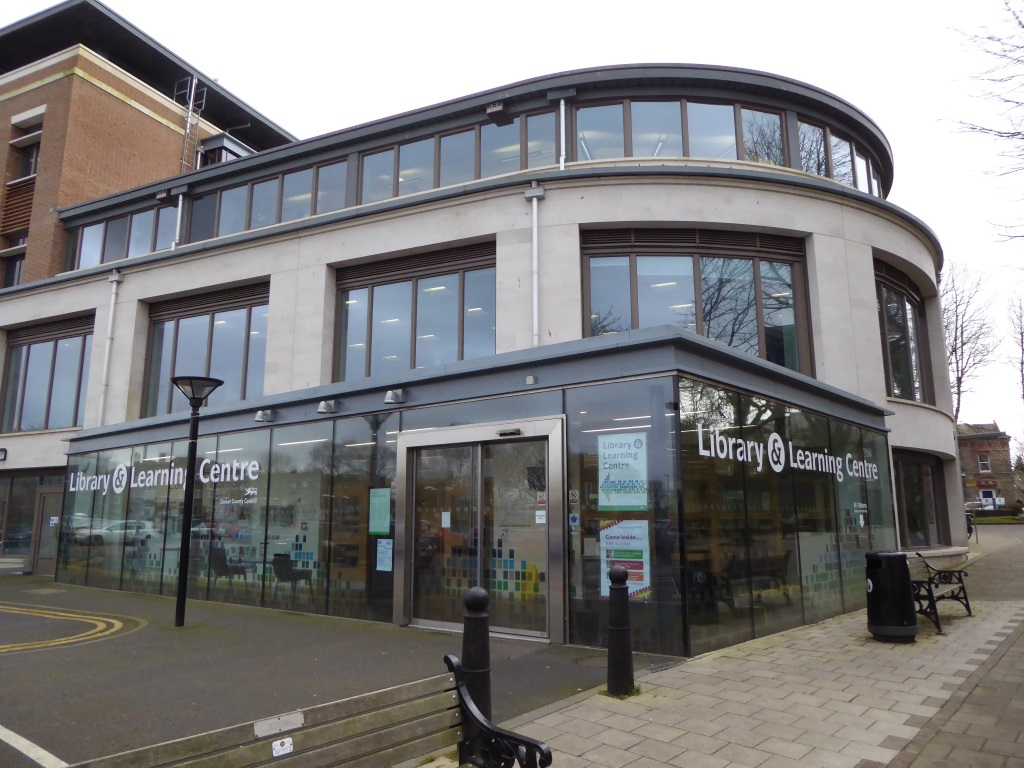
Dorchester Library and Learning Centre

Dorchester has thirteen first schools, three middle schools: St Osmund's Church of England Middle School, St Mary's Church of England Middle School, Puddletown and Dorchester Middle School and an upper school; The Thomas Hardye School which was founded in 1569 and endowed by Thomas Hardye, a merchant in 1579. A free school "one of the most striking achievements of puritan Dorchester" operated here in the 1600s. The Thomas Hardye School was expanded and reopened in 1888 and in February 2023 it had 2,103 pupils enrolled. The author Thomas Hardy, a distant relative, was a school governor here from 1909 until shortly before his death. The nineteen schools in the Dorchester area form the Dorchester Area Schools Partnership (DASP). There is also a private school, Sunninghill Prep School.

Kingston Maurward College is a land-based studies college on the outskirts of the town. It offers full-time and part-time courses, apprenticeships and university-level courses in a wide range of subjects including agriculture, horticulture, conservation, construction, countryside and wildlife management.

The town's hospital is Dorset County Hospital on Williams Avenue. It offers a twenty-four-hour accident and emergency treatment with services being provided by Dorset County Hospital NHS Foundation Trust.

== Sport and leisure ==
Dorchester Town F.C., the town's football team currently play in the Southern League Premier Division. Harry Redknapp and former England players Graham Roberts and Martin Chivers represented 'The Magpies' in the late 1970s and early 1980s. The club is based on Weymouth Avenue in the south of the town after moving from its old ground also on Weymouth Avenue. The club moved to the purpose-built 5,000 capacity Avenue Stadium on Duchy of Cornwall land in the early 1990s.

Dorchester Sports F.C. is an amateur Association football team who currently play in the Dorset Premier Football League. The club was founded in 2007 and ground share at Dorchester Town F.C.'s The Avenue Stadium.

Dorchester RFC is an amateur rugby union team who currently play in the Dorset & Wilts South 1 League. Dorchester Cricket Club play in the Dorset Premier League, being last crowned champions in 2009.

A leisure centre and swimming pool on Coburg Road replaced the Thomas Hardye School Leisure Centre in 2012, at a cost of more than £8 million.

In May 2009, a skatepark opened at the junction of Maumbury Road and Weymouth Avenue in Dorchester after 12 years of planning and construction.

== Transport ==
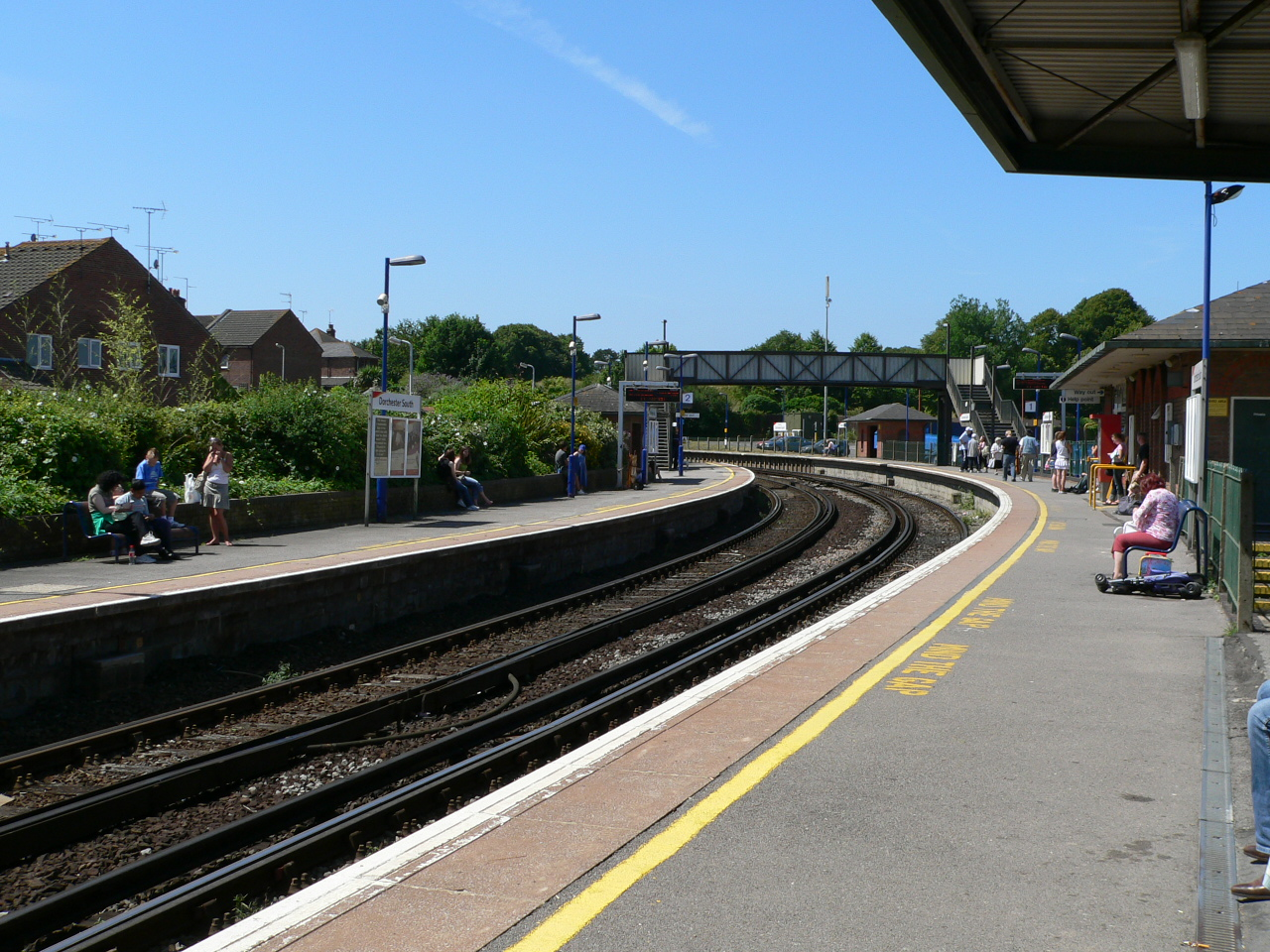
Dorchester South station

The town has two railway stations:

- Dorchester South is on the South West Main Line between London Waterloo, Bournemouth, Southampton Central and Weymouth. Services are operated by South Western Railway. As part of the regeneration at the Brewery Site in the town centre, it will become the first solar-powered railway station in the UK.
- Dorchester West, designed by Isambard Kingdom Brunel, is on the Heart of Wessex Line, operated by Great Western Railway. It connects the town with Yeovil Pen Mill, Bath Spa, Bristol Temple Meads and Gloucester.

The town is on the A35, a trunk road connecting to Poole in the east and Honiton in the west; the A37 road north to Yeovil; the A352 road north to Sherborne; and the A354 road south to Weymouth. Mowlem completed a bypass road to the south and west of the town in 1988, diverting through traffic away from the town centre. The A35 is often subject to severe traffic congestion due to it being one of the main routes towards the south-west.

Buses are operated by First Hampshire & Dorset. Notable services include route 10, a frequent service to Weymouth via Upwey and route X51 to Bridport. Damory Coaches and South West Coaches also operate local and regional services. National Express operates long-distance coach journeys stopping at Dorchester with destinations including London Victoria and Weymouth.

== Media ==
Local radio stations serving Dorchester include Greatest Hits Radio Dorset, BBC Radio Solent, and community radio station Keep 106, which grew from the County Hospital's hospital radio station. Local television is by BBC South in Southampton, ITV Meridian in Whiteley, BBC South West in Plymouth and ITV West Country in Bristol. Dorchester's regular print media comprises the Dorset Echo.

Many homes in Dorchester have access to fibre broadband services provided by private companies. The town is part of the second phase of Superfast Dorset, a project to increase fibre broadband availability within the county, which has been completed.

== Notable people ==
- Fran Bagenal (born 1954), Professor of Astrophysical and Planetary Sciences, at the University of Colorado Boulder
- Julian Fellowes (born 1949), House of Lords, novelist, screenwriter, actor and producer. Producer of television shows Downton Abbey and Gilded Age.
- Thomas Hardy (1840–1928), novelist and poet, architecturally trained and settled in the town where he died at his home, Max Gate.
- Paul Hillier (born 1949), classical singer and composer, was born in Dorchester. He attended The Thomas Hardye School.
- Henry Moule (1801–1880), vicar of Fordington from 1829 and inventor of the dry earth closet.
- Llewelyn Powys (1884–1939), novelist and essayist, was born in Dorchester.
- Tom Roberts (1856–1931), Australian painter, was born in Dorchester.
- Sir Frederick Treves (1853–1923), surgeon to King Edward VII, born in the town and buried at St Peter's Church.
- Lettice D'Oyly Walters (nee Harmar) (1880–1940), poet and editor, was born in Dorchester.
- Norrie Woodhall (1905–2011), actress, was born in Dorchester

=== Sport ===
- Orlando Bailey (born 2001), Rugby Union Fly Half for Bath Rugby, was born in the town, played for Dorchester Rugby Club and attended Thomas Hardye School.
- Paul Blake (born 1990), paralympian athlete, was born in the town.
- James Campbell (born 1988), cricketer, was born in the town.
- Aaron Cook (born 1991), a taekwondo athlete who competed in the 2008 Olympic Games finishing in fifth place, was born and educated in Dorchester.
- Sam Hoskins (born 1993), English professional footballer, was born in the town. He currently plays as an attacking midfielder for Northampton Town.
- Henry Pyrgos (born 1989), Scottish International rugby player, was born in the town.
- Sam Sherring, (born 2000), English professional footballer, was born in the town. He currently plays as a centre back for Milton Keynes Dons
- Ethan Staddon, (born 2002), Rugby Union Flanker for Bath Rugby, was born in the town and played for Dorchester Rugby Club at Junior level.
- John Stewart, (born 2002), Rugby Union Hooker for Bath Rugby, was born in the town and played for Dorchester Rugby Club at Junior level.
- Kirsty Way (born 1998), trampoline gymnast, was born in Dorchester

== Twin towns ==
Dorchester is twinned with three European towns:

- Bayeux in France since 1959, because the Dorset Regiment were the first soldiers to enter the town in 1944 as the Second World War came to an end.
- Lübbecke in Germany since 1973, initiated when the Durnovaria Silver Band met the Lübbecker Schützenmusik Corps in Bayeux in 1968, when that town was in the process of twinning with Lübbecke.
- Holbæk in Denmark since 1992, resulting from a shared interest in community drama. Actors from each town have appeared in plays in the other community.

The town's schools are twinned with schools in Europe, Africa and Asia. The Thomas Hardye School has partnerships with schools in Tanzania, Dehradun and Bayeux.

== Freedom of the Town ==
Sir Frederick Treves received the Freedom of the Town of Dorchester in July 1902, and Thomas Hardy on 15 November 1910. A number of local men who served as soldiers in South Africa during the Second Boer War were granted the honorary freedom of the borough of Dorchester in a ceremony on 5 February 1903.

== Bibliography ==
- Bingham, A. (1987) Dorset : Ordnance Survey landranger guidebook , Norwich: Jarrold, ISBN 0-319-00187-3
- Chandler, J. H. (1990) Wessex images, Gloucester: Alan Sutton and Wiltshire County Council Library & Museum Service, ISBN 0-86299-739-9
- Draper, J. (1992) Dorchester : An illustrated history Wimborne: Dovecote Press, ISBN 1-874336-04-0
- Morris, J. and Draper, J. (1995) "The 'Enclosure' of Fordington Fields and the Development of Dorchester, 1874–1903", Dorset Natural History and Archaeological Society proceedings, v. 117, p. 5–14, ISSN 0070-7112
- Pitt-Rivers, M. (1966) Dorset, A Shell guide, New ed., London: Faber, ISBN 0-571-06714-X
- Taylor, C. (1970) Dorset, Making of the English landscape, London: Hodder & Stoughton, p. 197–201, ISBN 0-340-10962-9
- Waymark, J, (1997) "The Duchy of Cornwall and the Expansion of Dorchester, c. 1900–1997", Dorset Natural History and Archaeological Society proceedings, v. 119, p. 19–32, ISSN 0070-7112
