= Hinton St Mary =

Village in Dorset, England

Coordinates: 50.9444°N 2.3059°W

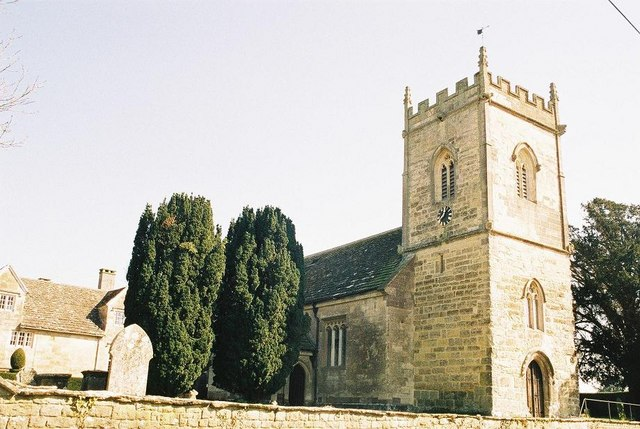
- Parish church of St Peter

- Location within Dorset
- Population: 225
- OS grid reference: ST786162
- Unitary authority: Dorset
- Ceremonial county: Dorset
- Region: South West
- Country: England
- Sovereign state: United Kingdom
- Post town: Sturminster Newton
- Postcode district: DT10
- Police: Dorset
- Fire: Dorset and Wiltshire
- Ambulance: South Western
- UK Parliament: North Dorset

Hinton St Mary is a village and civil parish in Dorset, southern England. It is sited on a low Corallian limestone ridge beside the River Stour, one mile (1.5 kilometres) north of the market town Sturminster Newton. In 2001 the parish had 97 households and a population of 221. In 2013 the estimated population of the parish was 260. In 2021 the estimated population of the parish has decreased to 225.

The village includes a parish church, a traditional pub, a manor house, a village hall and a water mill.

== History ==
The church, dedicated to St Peter, has a 15th-century tower. The manor house was once owned by the nuns of Shaftesbury Abbey, and its grounds includes a noted avenue of beech trees.

The village has a community garden, the Millennium Garden, which was constructed in 1999 as an episode of the BBC series Charlies Garden Angels, with local people and businesses helping to create it.

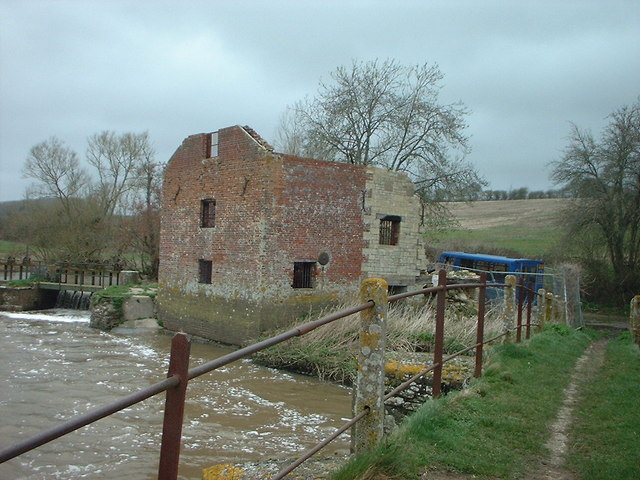
Cutt Mill in 2006

Cutt Mill, a water mill on the River Stour to the northwest of the village, was burned down in 2003 by vandals. The building remains unused as the structure is now unsafe.

== Roman mosaic ==
In 1963 a Roman building of unknown type, possibly a villa or a church, was discovered in the village. On the floor of one room was laid a large 4th-century mosaic depicting Bellerophon and the Chimera (illustrating good defeating evil) and a portrait bust that may be a depiction of Christ. The bust is now on display in the British Museum. The rest is kept in storage.

A return visit was made to the site of the mosaic in 2021, with several exploration trenches dug and several interesting finds uncovered.

In July 2022, archaeologists from the British Museum unearthed another Roman mosaic dating to the 4th century AD and hundreds of objects from regularly positioned such as jewelry, cash, roof tiles and kiln bricks. Although the mosaic has long been influenced by plowing farmland, it contains a black, white and purple tesserae.

== Notable people ==
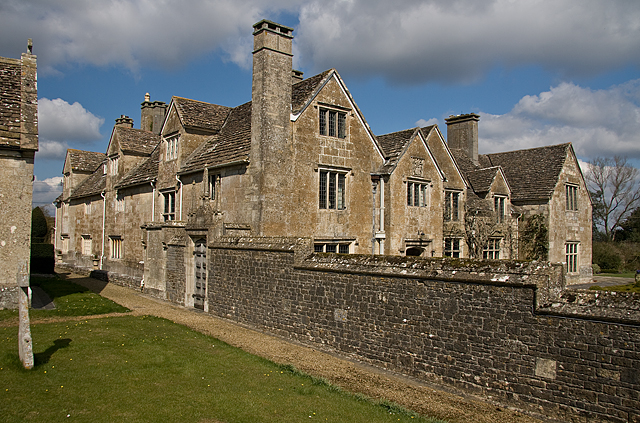
The Grade II* listed Manor House, Hinton St Mary

The Manor was the home of the prominent Pitt-Rivers family.

- Rosalind Pitt-Rivers FRS (1907–1990) biochemist who participated in the discovery of the thyroid hormone triiodothyronine died in the village.
