= Dorset (district) =

Unitary authority area in England

- Unitary authority area
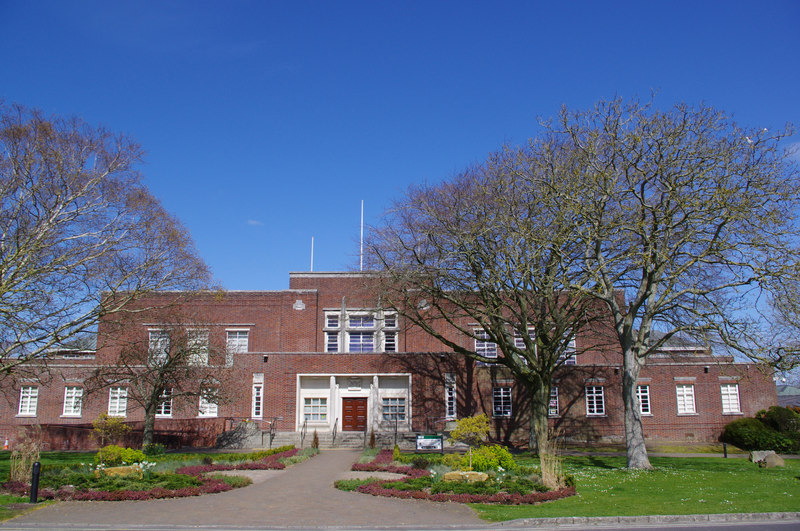
- County Hall, Dorchester, the headquarters of Dorset Council

- The Dorset unitary authority area within the eponymous ceremonial county. To the east is the Bournemouth, Christchurch and Poole unitary authority area.
- Coordinates: 50°48′N 2°18′W
- Sovereign state: United Kingdom
- Constituent country: England
- Region: South West England
- Ceremonial county: Dorset
- Historic county: Dorset
- Admin HQ: County Hall, Dorchester

Government
  - Type: Unitary authority
  - Governing body: Dorset Council
  - Chair: Cllr Stella Jones (Lib Dem)
  - Leader: Cllr Nick Ireland (Lib Dem)

Area
  - Total: 962 sq mi (2,491 km^{2})
  - Rank: 9th (of 296)

Population (2025)
  - Total: 391,036
  - Rank: 20th (of 296)
  - Density: 410/sq mi (157/km^{2})

Ethnicity (2021)
  - Ethnic groups: List: 97.1% White; 1.2% Mixed; 1.1% Asian; 0.4% other; 0.3% Black

Religion (2021)
  - Religion: List: 51.6% Christianity; 40.1% no religion; 7.9% other; 0.4% Islam
- Time zone: UTC+00:00 (Greenwich Mean Time)
  - Summer (DST): UTC+01:00 (British Summer Time)
- Postcodes: BH, DT, SP
- ISO 3166-2: GB-DOR
- ONS code: E06000059
- NUTS: UKK22 (partially)
- Website: www.dorsetcouncil.gov.uk

Dorset is a unitary authority area within the larger ceremonial county of Dorset, South West England. It covers the entire ceremonial county with the exception of Bournemouth, Christchurch and Poole in the south-east. The largest settlement is Weymouth, and the administrative centre is Dorchester.

The unitary authority area was formed on 1 April 2019 during a local government restructure. Prior to this, Dorset was a non-metropolitan county containing six non-metropolitan districts, and was governed by a county council and six district councils. The unitary authority area was created by abolishing the county, districts, and their councils, and establishing a new non-metropolitan county and a new non-metropolitan district, each with the same area as the former districts of East Dorset, North Dorset, Purbeck, West Dorset, and Weymouth and Portland. The area of the sixth former district, Christchurch, was incorporated into the new unitary authority area of Bournemouth, Christchurch, and Poole. The new Dorset Council was constituted as a non-metropolitan district council with the responsibilities of a non-metropolitan county council. The first elections to the council took place on 2 May 2019.

== Rationale and other tiers of government ==
With regard to planning decisions, highways, cleaning, education and social care, no confusion remains as to the potentially relevant body (including occasional open conflict of powers/responsibilities) between two tiers of local government (which can be the case where county and district councils co-exist).

Significant saving (economy of scale) follows from executive and one body of councillors as compared to six each of varying functions. Co-working measures had long been shown locally to make inroads towards an efficient, combined approach. This delivers better value for ratepayers.

Allaying fears of democratic deficit, the council area's population, approximately 380,000, is smaller than the most populous and complex or larger unitary authorities such as Birmingham City Council (serving more than 1,000,000 people) and Wiltshire Council (covering a larger area).

All of the unitary authority area retains another tier of local government, by having a civil parish, a late Victorian innovation which has been reduced to a consultative planning and minor amenities role such as co-funding events, festivities, footpaths and sports facilities during the 20th century. The funding of civil parishes is through a small tax supplement to council tax known as civil parish precept.

== See also ==
- 2019–2023 structural changes to local government in England
