= Over Stratton =

Village in Somerset, England

Coordinates: 50°55′59″N 2°48′18″W

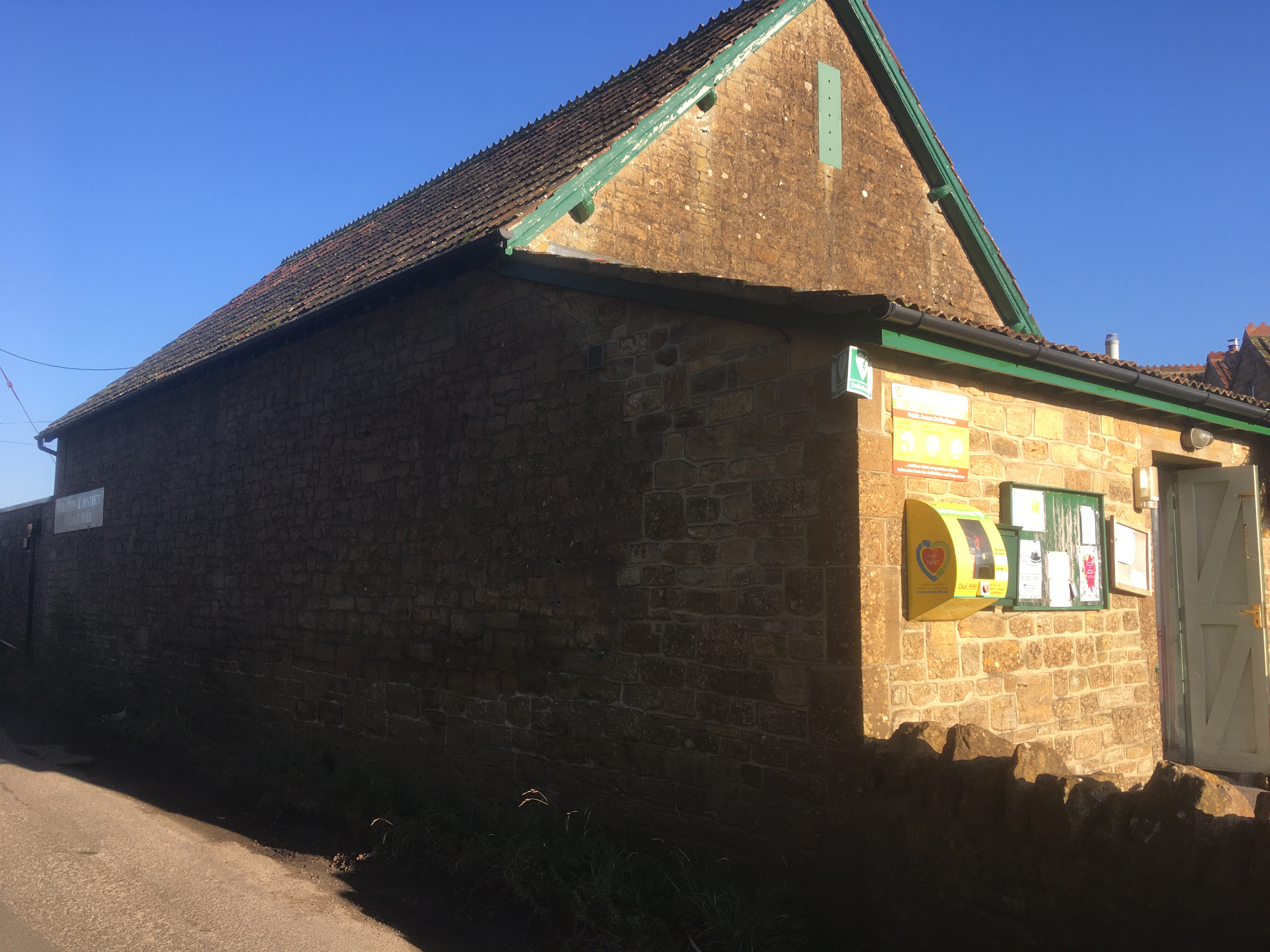
- Stratton and District Village Hall

- Location within Somerset
- Population: 317
- OS grid reference: ST435151
- Civil parish: South Petherton
- Unitary authority: Somerset
- Ceremonial county: Somerset
- Region: South West
- Country: England
- Sovereign state: United Kingdom
- Post town: SOUTH PETHERTON
- Postcode district: TA13
- Dialling code: 01460
- Police: Avon and Somerset
- Fire: Devon and Somerset
- Ambulance: South Western
- UK Parliament: Yeovil

Over Stratton is a small village in Somerset, England. It is part of the parish of South Petherton along with the nearby hamlets of Lower Stratton, Wigborough, Yeabridge, Drayton and Watergore. As of census day 2011, the population was 317.

Towards the north end of the village, Stratton & District Village Hall provides an amenity for the local residents and hosts community events such as coffee mornings. It also hosts a nursery for pre-school age children.

The village also had a Methodist church but services are no longer held there and the building has been converted into residual use.

There was a blacksmith's forge on a side track leading off Bull Bridge Lane.

== History ==
The South Petherton Local History Group has published a booklet titled "Explore South Petherton's Past" that contains a number of references to Over Stratton, particularly on pages 32 and 33. These include the Church Room (now the village hall) built in 1865, the Fosse Way, a farmhouse (now the Royal Oak Inn), a raised pavement, the Methodist church, a socket-stone, Stratton Farm and West End House.

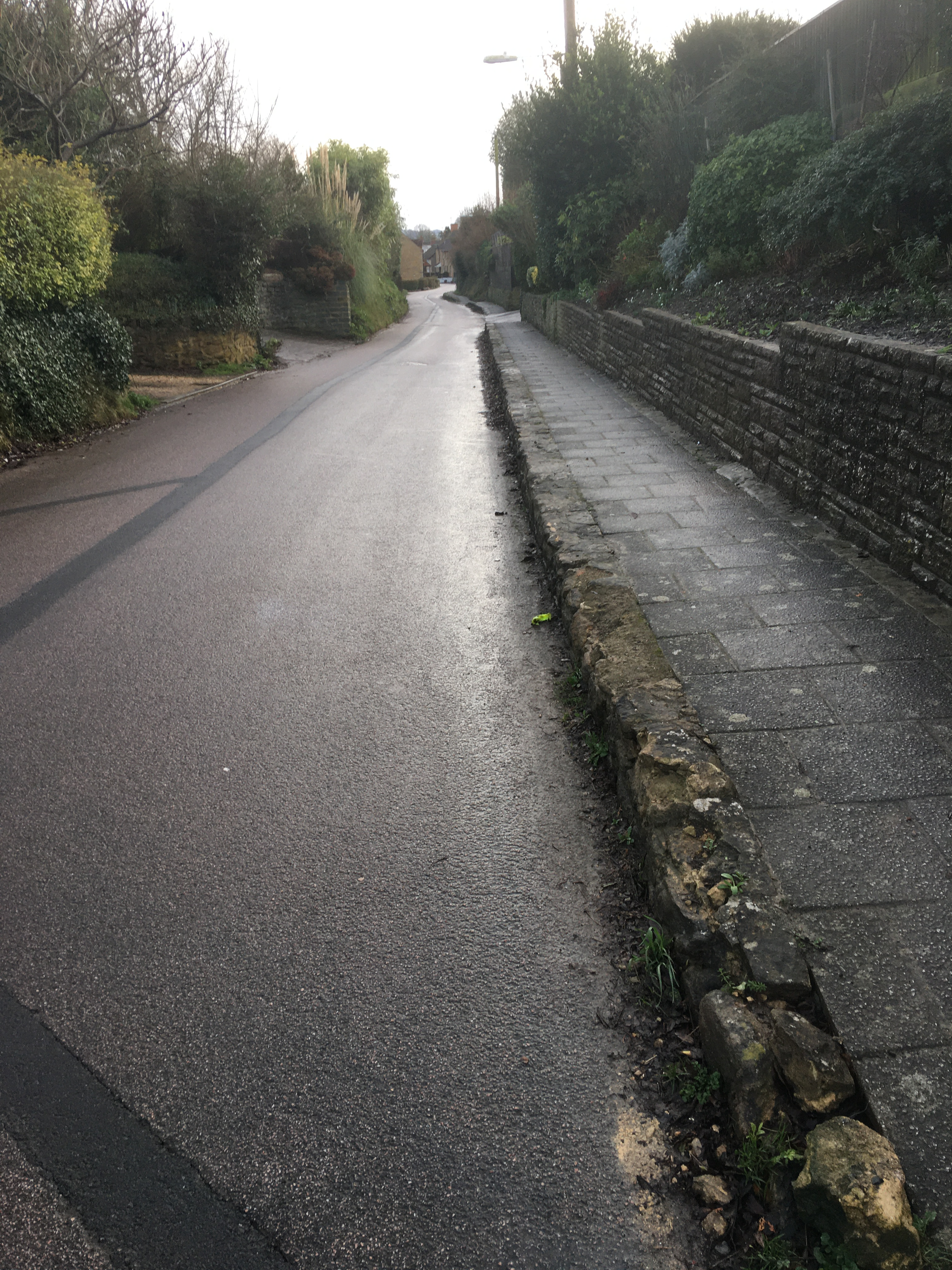
The raised pavement, looking southwards along the main street.

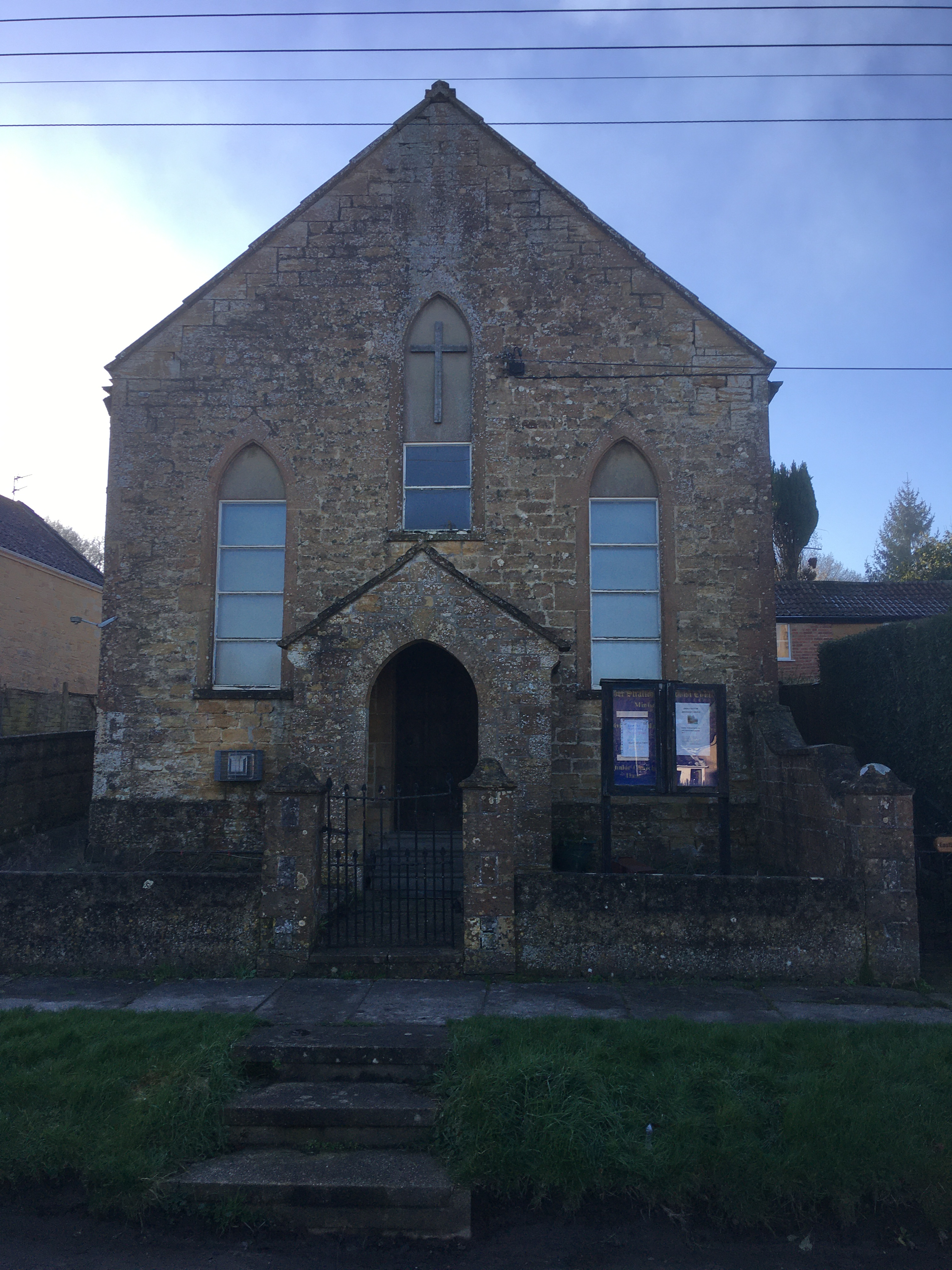
Over Stratton Methodist church

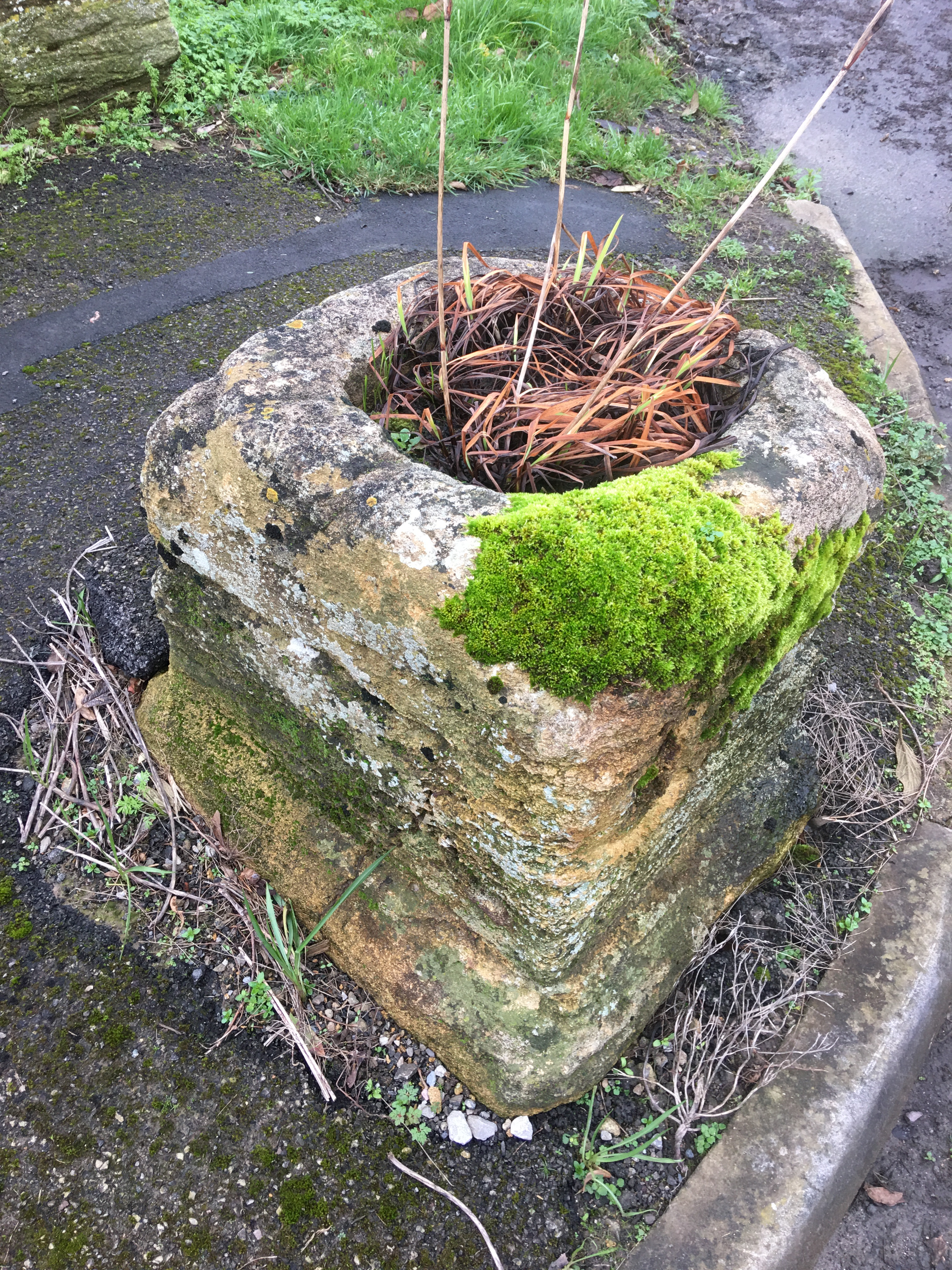
Socket-stone, at junction of South Harp and Lopen Lane, Over Stratton

There are numerous references to Over Stratton and the other settlements forming part of the parish of South Petherton in "A History of the County of Somerset."

Historic England has nine entries of Grade II listed buildings and structures:

- West End House;
- Barn, about 15 meters north west of West End House;
- East boundary wall and gateways to West End House;
- Old Harp House;
- Socket Stone of Wayside Cross (at the junction of South Harp, Lopen Lane and Bull Bridge Lane);
- Stratton Farmhouse;
- Royal Oak Inn;
- Herontye and Hollands Orchard;
- House about 70 meters north of Royal Oak Inn, and coach house to east.

== Geography ==
The village sits on sandstone, the Bridport Sand Formation, a sedimentary bedrock formed approximately 174 to 183 million years ago in the Jurassic Period. Locally, it is also known as Yeovil Sandstone. In parts of the village the bedrock is overlain by clay deposits. According to the Agricultural Land Classification Map South West Region (ALC006), Over Stratton is located on class 1 (excellent) agricultural land. As such it is “Land with no or very minor limitations. A very wide range of agricultural and horticultural crops can be grown and commonly includes: top fruit, soft fruit, salad crops and winter harvested vegetables. Yields are high and less variable than on land of lower quality.” Ordnance Survey maps from the nineteenth and early twentieth centuries show a number of apple orchards in and around the village. Most of the orchards within the village boundary have been subject to residential development in the second half of the twentieth century.

Many of the older buildings were built using Hamstone from nearby Ham Hill quarries. It is a honey-coloured Jurassic limestone.

The principal street runs north–south through the village and is unnamed although some local government organizations refer to it as "Over Stratton Road, South Petherton", for example, when publishing temporary road closure orders. The route of Roman road, the Fosse Way, crosses this street in a northeast southwest direction. The route of the Fosse Way is joined by the A303 2 km northeast of the village, close to Petherton Bridge over the River Parrett. Some of the minor streets joining the principal streets are named but none of the streets other than Church Path and Gorefield have a numbering system for the properties. On the village noticeboard there is an outline map that includes an indexed list of 143 properties and their corresponding locations on the map.

There are 19 post codes covering the village and the immediate vicinity:

Post code	Street name	Description
TA13 5JE	-	Old Bridge House, near A303
TA13 5JF	-	Bridge House Park, near A303
TA13 5JQ	Watergore	vicinity of old A303
TA13 5LB	Lopen Lane	road to Lopen
TA13 5LB	Bull Bridge Lane	road to Merriott
TA13 5LD	South Harp	Swedish Houses
TA13 5LE	South Harp	Airey houses
TA13 5LF	South Harp	road to Lower Stratton
TA13 5LG	-	southern end of main street
TA13 5LH	Northfield Lane	Watergore
TA13 5LJ	Northfield Lane	Over Stratton
TA13 5LL	-	northern end of main street
TA13 5LL	Gorefield	northern end of main street
TA13 5LN	Church Path	northern end of main street, closest to Watergore
TA13 5LQ	-	central main street
TA13 5LP	Wigborough	and parts of Lower Stratton
TA13 5LR	Drayton	includes Flaxdrayton Farm
TA13 5LW	Yeabridge	
TA13 5FH	Lower Stratton	including Yeabridge Court

The Royal Mail post box is located at the centre of the village, just to the south of the private house called 'The Wines'. The collection times are Monday-Friday 09:00; Saturday 07:00. The nearest priority post box is on Hayes End in South Petherton with collections at Monday-Friday 16:00; Saturday 09:15. Later collections are made at the post offices in South Petherton and Crewkerne, and the sorting office at Crewkerne. 'The Vines' was the site of the former village shop and post office. The telephone box has been removed.

=== Transport ===
The village lies south of the A303 trunk road so it has excellent road transport links to east and west. On the former route of the old A303 on Harp Road, there is a fuel station by which there are bus stops for local services to South Petherton and Yeovil, and express services to Taunton and Hammersmith, London. The nearest railway station is at Crewkerne, five miles to the south of the village.

The River Parrett Trail, a walking route that follows the course of the river, passes through the village.

=== Nearby hamlets ===
The hamlet of Yeabridge lies approximately 0.5 miles north of Lower Stratton, along Yeabridge Lane, and gives its name to postal addresses in Lower Stratton and Wigborough.

Lower Stratton is approximately one mile south of the Hayes End Roundabout on the A303 at the southern end of Yeabridge Lane. It is also approximately 0.5 miles east of the village of Over Stratton along South Harp. A third road, Creedy Bridge Road, exits Lower Stratton, initially heading northwards then turning eastwards, past Pound, over the Creedy Bridge towards Norton-sub-Hamdon. Lower Stratton is contiguous with Wigborough, another hamlet in the parish of South Petherton.

Somewhat confusingly, the Yeabridge Farm complex of buildings is located in Lower Stratton. The farm is the commercial hub of the hamlet and has diversified into glamping, a 50 kW solar photovoltaic array and secure storage. It also hosts two other businesses, one specializing in the sale and maintenance of agricultural equipment and the other an electrical contracting firm. South Somerset District Council granted planning permission to convert the original Hamstone farm buildings into 11 residential units. These buildings have been replaced by constructing new buildings at the southern end of Little Lopen Lane.

In Wigborough, the most notable building is Wigborough Manor House, just east of Lower Stratton along Wigborough Manor Lane. Wigborough Manor House is the home of the Vaux Park Polo Club.

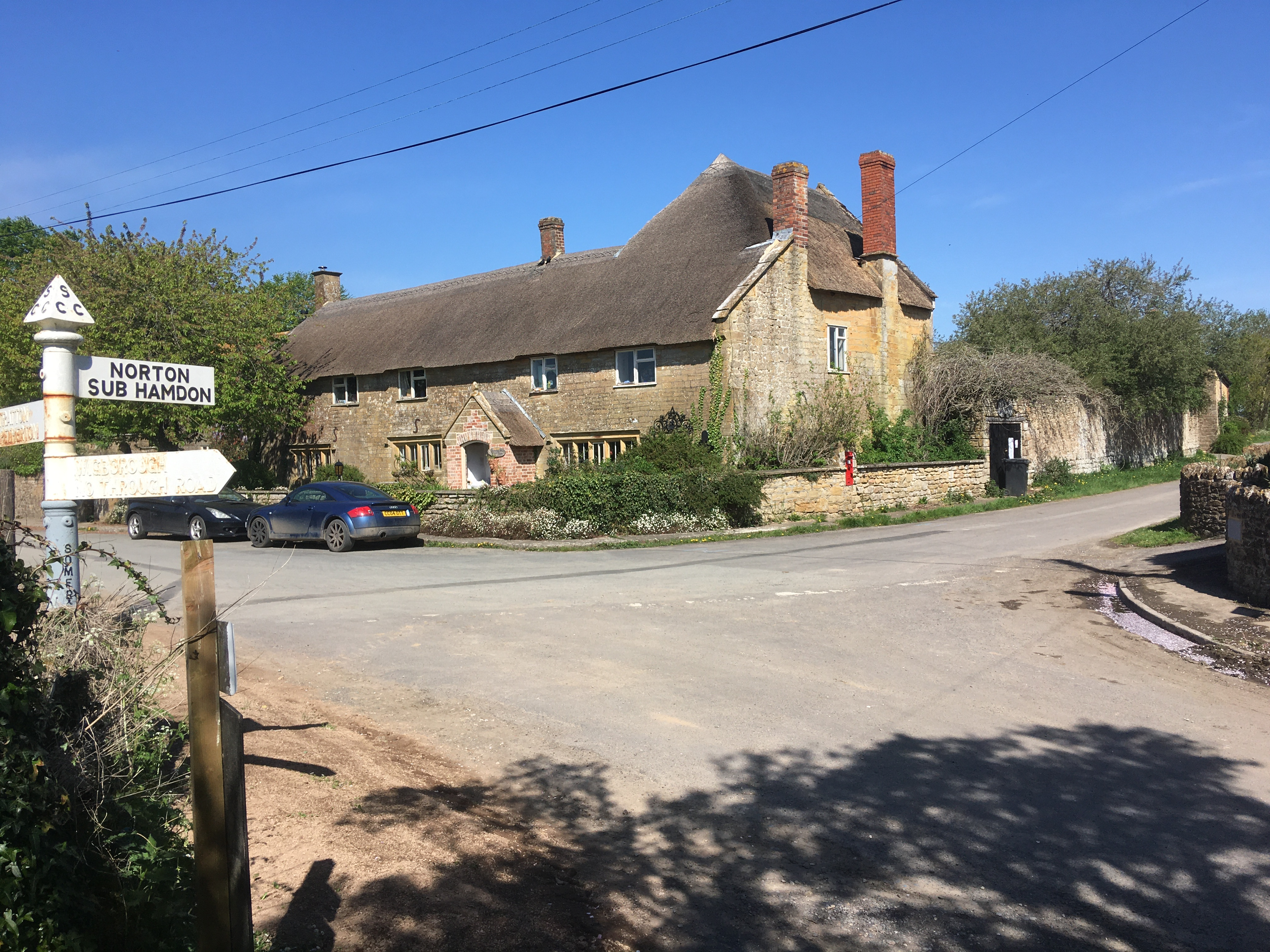
Lower Stratton South Harp Farm

Drayton is one of two other hamlets to the east of Yeabridge lying just within the parish boundary, close to the River Parrett: Drayton itself and the area north of Drayton and southwest of Petherton Bridge.

Drayton formerly comprised two farms, Drayton Farm and Bridge Farm. Drayton Farm was renamed Flaxdrayton Farm by the current owner after he acquired sole ownership of the farm in 1976. Drayton has three listed buildings, Flaxdrayton Farm House, Flaxdrayton Mill and two cottages formerly associated with Bridge Farm. The Flaxdrayton farm buildings are now the site of a number of small businesses that hold periodic open days for the general public to attend. Plans are being developed to convert the Bridge Farm buildings into a Cohousing project. To the north, Old Bridge House is Grade II listed and is now used as a venue for weddings. Nearby is a residential house park of 25 homes.

Watergore is situated west of the Hayes End roundabout at the eastern end of the A303 Ilminster bypass. Prior to the opening of the bypass in 1989, the A303 passed through Watergore.

The western boundary of the parish of South Petherton and the hamlet of Watergore is located at Higgin's Grave Lane. Just to the east of this lane there is a camp site and caravan park. Just across the boundary into the parish of Lopen there are a farm shop and two hospitality businesses.
