= Henry Hele =

English physician

Henry Hele (1688/89–1778) was an English physician, who became a substantial landowner in Wiltshire and Somerset.

== Origins ==
Hele was the son of Richard Hele, of the Close, Salisbury, who in his will dated 1704, proved in 1706, described himself as a gentleman. At the time of his father's will, Henry Hele had two brothers, Richard (1688/89–1756), later a prebendary of Salisbury) and John, and two sisters, Amy and Susannah. The elder Richard's origins are obscure, although he may be connected to the two Richard Heales (father and son), who were identified as musicians in deeds of bastardy and settlement from the 1670s in the Salisbury City Council archives.

== Practice ==
Hele practised successfully as a physician in Salisbury for over 50 years. He engaged in a long-running professional controversy in the Salisbury Journal with his younger rival, John Barker (1708–1749). At a meeting on 24 September 1766, he was nominated as one of the first two physicians of the new hospital that became the Salisbury Infirmary. Towards the end of his long life, in 1776, he became involved in a scandal concerning an alleged conspiracy by one Mary Bowes to have her sister Diana forcibly incarcerated in a lunatic asylum; Hele signed the certificate of lunacy that made the scheme possible and was indicted by a grand jury.

== Property ==
From 1744, Hele lived in Myles Place, one of the finest houses in the Cathedral Close in Salisbury. He was involved in numerous land transactions and acquired, in particular, the manors of Sock Dennis and South Petherton in Somerset, and Brook House and Lodgwood Farm, near Westbury, Wiltshire.

== Family, death and posterity ==
By his first wife, Martha Vince (or Vints), Hele had two daughters and co-heirs, Jane (1720/1–1768; married Thomas Phipps of Westbury Leigh, Wiltshire) and Martha (married Joceline Robinson). In April 1737, Hele married secondly Jane Rolfe, the daughter of John Rolfe, who reputedly brought with her a fortune of £10,000.

Hele died on 24 June 1778. In his will (proved on 9 July 1778), he made bequests of money totalling over £23,000, as well as disposing of his real property. He was buried in Salisbury Cathedral and his memorial inscription reads: "M.S. [Memoriae sacrum] Henrici Hele qui rem medicam in hoc clause & civitate adjacenti per quinqueginta annose probe & feliciter exercuit".
