= Salisbury Infirmary =

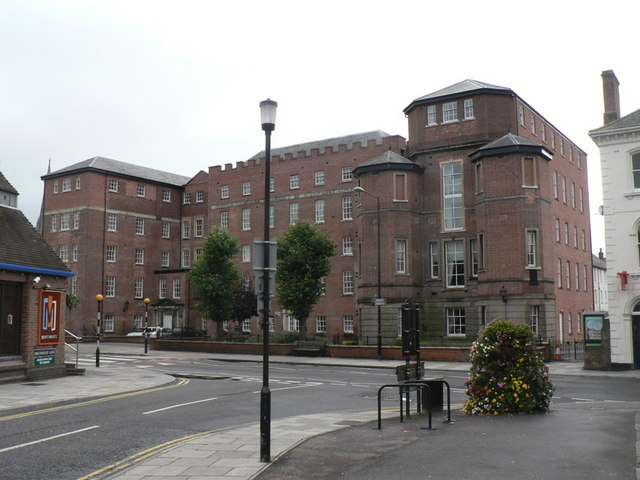
- The building in 2008, after residential conversion

- Shown in Wiltshire

Geography
- Location: Salisbury, Wiltshire, England
- Coordinates: 51.0678°N 1.8009°W

Organisation
- Care system: NHS England
- Type: District General

History
- Founded: 1766
- Closed: 1993

The Salisbury Infirmary was a hospital at Fisherton Street in Salisbury, Wiltshire, England, from 1767 until 1993.

== History ==
The Salisbury Infirmary had a long history as a hospital. The first Lord Feversham, who died in 1763, left a sum of £500 towards the establishment of a county hospital for Wiltshire and at a general meeting on 23 September 1766 a committee was established. The Earl of Pembroke was nominated as visitor, the Earl of Radnor as president, and Robert Cooper as treasurer, while Dr Henry Hele and Dr Jacob were appointed as physicians.

A site was purchased and the existing houses on it were opened for the reception of patients on 2 May 1767. Meanwhile, plans were drawn up by John Wood, the Younger of Bath for a new four-storey building on the site with over 100 beds. When the new red-brick building was completed and opened in 1771, the existing houses were removed. The hospital was later much enlarged, with a wing added on one side in either 1845 or 1847 and the other side in 1869, and further 20th-century extensions. Alfred Buckley was the chairman of the infirmary for 13 years in the late 19th century.

A new outpatients department, dedicated to T. E. Lawrence, the British military officer, was opened in 1936. The hospital joined the National Health Service in 1948. The building was recorded as Grade II listed in 1972, under the name General Infirmary.

It was in the intensive care unit at the Infirmary that the Thin Lizzy singer Phil Lynott died from an alcohol and drugs related illness in January 1986. After services transferred to the newly built Salisbury District Hospital in 1991 the Infirmary closed in 1993. The building was converted for residential use in 1997.

== Architectural history ==
The original brick-built building of 1767–1771 was designed by John Wood, the Younger of Bath. It had four floors, and fronted on to Fisherton Street, with a semi-circular forecourt. The frontage had a stone frieze near the top bearing the inscription 'GENERAL INFIRMARY SUPPORTED BY VOLUNTARY CONTRIBUTION : 1767'. The ground floor, the basement storey, was partly underground, and contained the Matron's room, the kitchen, cellars, pump room, laundry, laboratory, and other service rooms. The principal storey was the main floor of the Infirmary, and was accessed by a flight of steps from the forecourt. At the front on one side was the chapel, with the House Apothecary's room and dispensary on the other side. Behind these in the centre of the floor were the committee room, the examination room, and the 'best staircase'. Behind these, at the back of the floor was a single large ward, the Queensberry Ward, named after the Duke of Queensberry, one of the benefactors and who had given 'a large amount to the original building fund'. The mezzanine storey was the second floor of the building. This had the upper part of both the chapel and the Queensberry Ward (high-ceilinged wards were considered beneficial for the control of disease and infection), as well as two smaller 'bed rooms', a storeroom and the Apothecary's chamber. The central area featured a skylight well, which helped illuminate the building, especially the 'best staircase' directly below it. The third floor, the upper storey, contained wards named after donors. These comprised two more large wards which ran along the length of the frontage (the Pembroke Ward named after the Earl of Pembroke) and along the length of the back of the floor (the Radnor Ward named after the Earl of Radnor), with two smaller wards in the central part of the floor, the Feversham Ward named after Lord Feversham and the Bruce Ward, and a nurses' bedroom. On this floor too was a centrally placed skylight well.

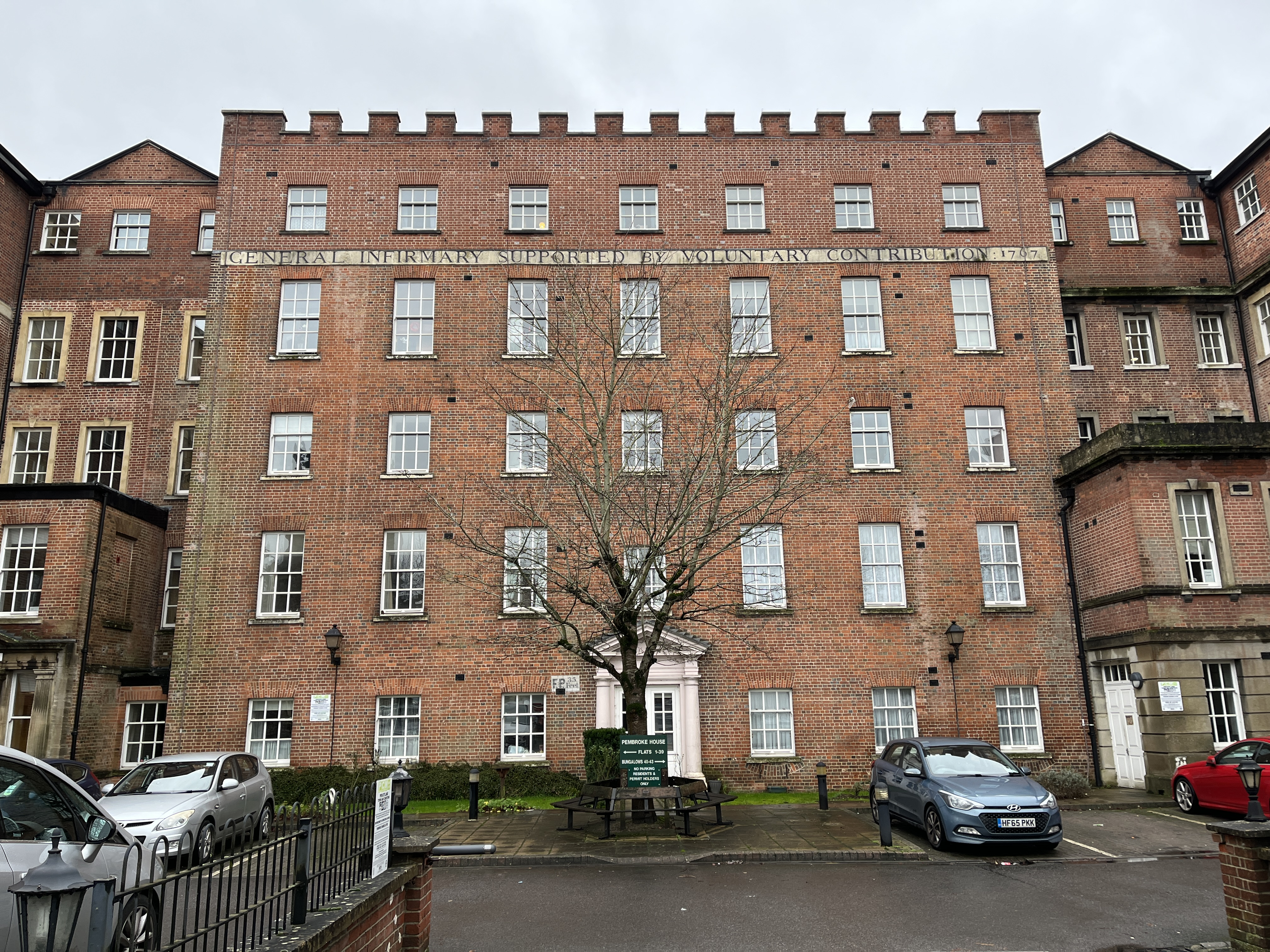
The Fisherton Street Georgian frontage of Salisbury Infirmary

In 1819 the chapel was converted into an accident ward.

In either 1845, according to the Historic England listing information or 1847, according to recent research by Salisbury Healthcare History, an east wing was added to the Georgian building (to the left on photographs taken from Fisherton Street). This was also brick-built, with half octagon bays and hipped slate roofs Building work for the matching west wing began in 1868 and the wing opened in 1870.

At some point between 1845–7 and 1892 the entrance was moved from the first floor to the ground floor, and the steps were removed.

In 1934 more alterations were proposed for the site, with the plan of works showing the large size of the infirmary campus by that time. Among the developments from this time was the opening of a new outpatients' department in 1936.

After the Infirmary closed in 1993 the site was sold, and it was redeveloped for residential use in 1997. This work included altering the frontage by lowering the frieze with the inscription and inserting another floor with smaller windows above it.

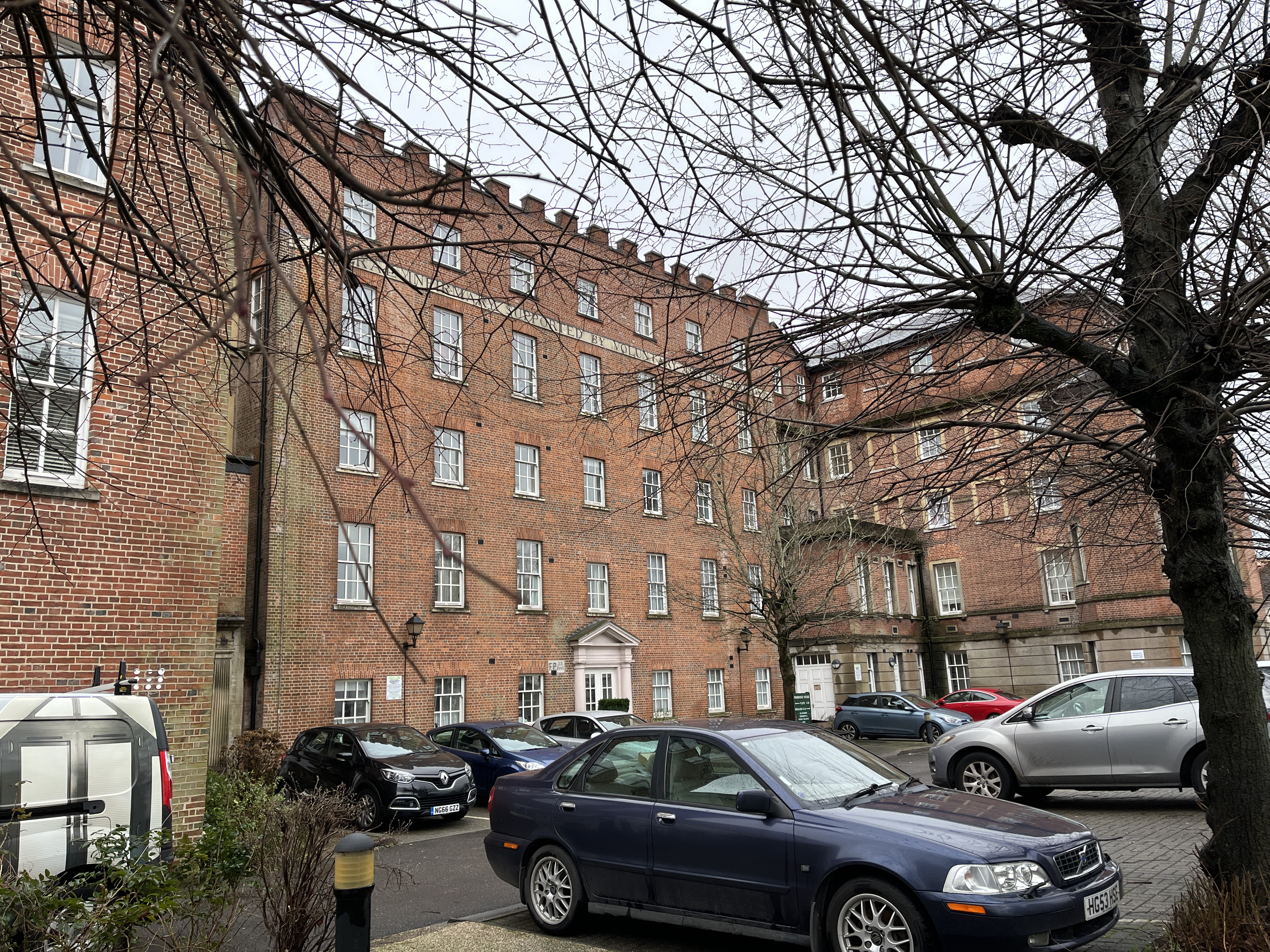
Salisbury Infirmary: parts of the west and east wings

== Notable staff ==
Adeline Elizabeth Cable (1864–1945) was Matron from October 1907 until her retirement in August 1925. Cable trained at The London Hospital under Eva Luckes, and had served in the Second Anglo Boer War. During her tenure at the Infirmary her nursing staff increased from 30 to 60, and she oversaw the opening of a new ophthalmic ward, a new nurses' home and an outpatients department, and the provision of balconies for all the wards.

Mary Louisa Fawcett (1875–1937) also trained at The London and was Lady Superintendent in charge of the nurses' home during part of the First World War.
