= Coke Memorial Methodist Church =

Church in Somerset, England

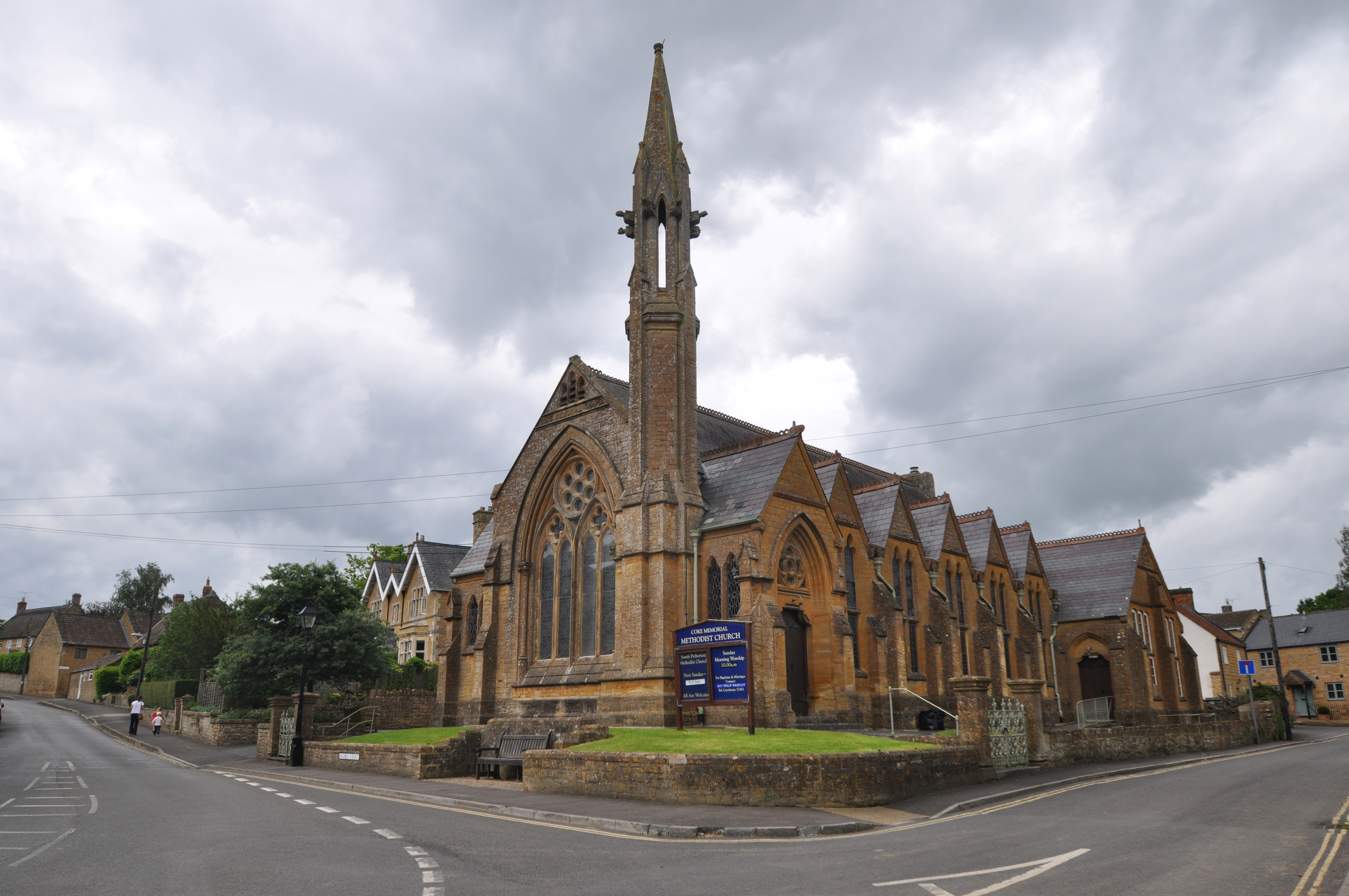

Religion
- Affiliation: Methodist
- Ecclesiastical or organizational status: Closed

Location
- Location: South Petherton, Somerset, England
- Interactive map of Coke Memorial Methodist Church
- Coordinates: 50.9501°N 2.8103°W

Architecture
- Architect: Alexander Lauder
- Type: Church
- Completed: 1882

Specifications
- Capacity: 320
- Materials: Hamstone

Coke Memorial Methodist Church is a former Methodist church in South Petherton, Somerset, England. Designed by Alexander Lauder, it was built in 1881-82 and has been a Grade II listed building since 1988. It closed as a place of worship in 2023.

== History ==
The Coke Memorial Methodist Church was built to replace an earlier Wesleyan Methodist chapel of 1809, which was located on the west side of North Street, and had become too dilapidated and uncomfortable to serve the local congregation. The new church was to be erected in memory of Rev. Dr. Thomas Coke, who was the Church of England curate of the village in 1772-76 and went on to become an important figure in Methodism and one of the founders of the Wesleyan Missionary Society. The original scheme, which proposed raising £5,000 to build a new chapel, minister's house and two schools, was launched in 1875 under Rev. J. Bell, superintendent of the South Petherton circuit.

The scheme lapsed until 1881, when it was revived by Rev. Bell's successor, Rev. J Workman, who initially wanted to determine whether there would be sufficient support for such a scheme. Once convinced, a committee was formed and funds began to be raised. A meeting held in April 1881 saw £750 raised towards the scheme. With the unresolved need for improved educational facilities, a schoolroom to accommodate approximately 200 children was included as part of the scheme. Mr. Alexander Lauder of Barnstaple drew up the plans for the church and schoolroom.

Mr. J. Walter of South Petherton was hired as the builder, with Messrs. Hallett Bros of South Petherton handling the masonry work and Mr. John Trask of Norton-sub-Hamdon the stone work. With £1,020 raised, the memorial stones of the church were laid during a ceremony on 10 August 1881. Those who laid stones included Mrs. W. T. Bradford of Martock, Mrs J. Bradfort of London, Mrs. Jabez Bradford of Yeovil, Mr. Hosegood of Dillington and Mr. W. Steate of Watchet. On 25 March 1882, Master Joseph Workman, the son of Rev. Workman, placed the top stone on the spire of the church, as the building approached completion.

The church opened for Divine worship on 24 August 1882 and a dedication service was held at midday in the presence of a large congregation and local ministers. The total cost of the project was £2,118, including £500 for the site. £349 was still to be raised at the time of the church's opening. A new organ was opened at the church on 8 November 1894. It cost £200 and was built by Mr. F. Minns of Taunton.

The church closed as a place of worship in 2023, with a closing service led by Rev. Andrew Longshaw on 1 October.

== Architecture ==
The church is built of Hamstone, with Welsh slate on the roof, in the Gothic style. It was designed to accommodate 320 persons on seating of pitch pine. The church has a south-eastern turret and spire of about 70 feet in height. The front window's stained glass, created by Mr. Swaine Bourne of Birmingham, was gifted by Mrs. Masters of Devizes in memory of her father. The rostrum was created by Mr. Pulsford of Barnstaple. The polished steps are of Pibsbury stone, sourced from the quarries of Messrs. Bradford & Sons, and laid as a memorial to Rev. T. W. Smith of Ilminster.
