= Church of St Peter and St Paul, South Petherton =

Church in Somerset, England

Coordinates: 50.94840°N 2.80939°W

Church of St Peter and St Paul
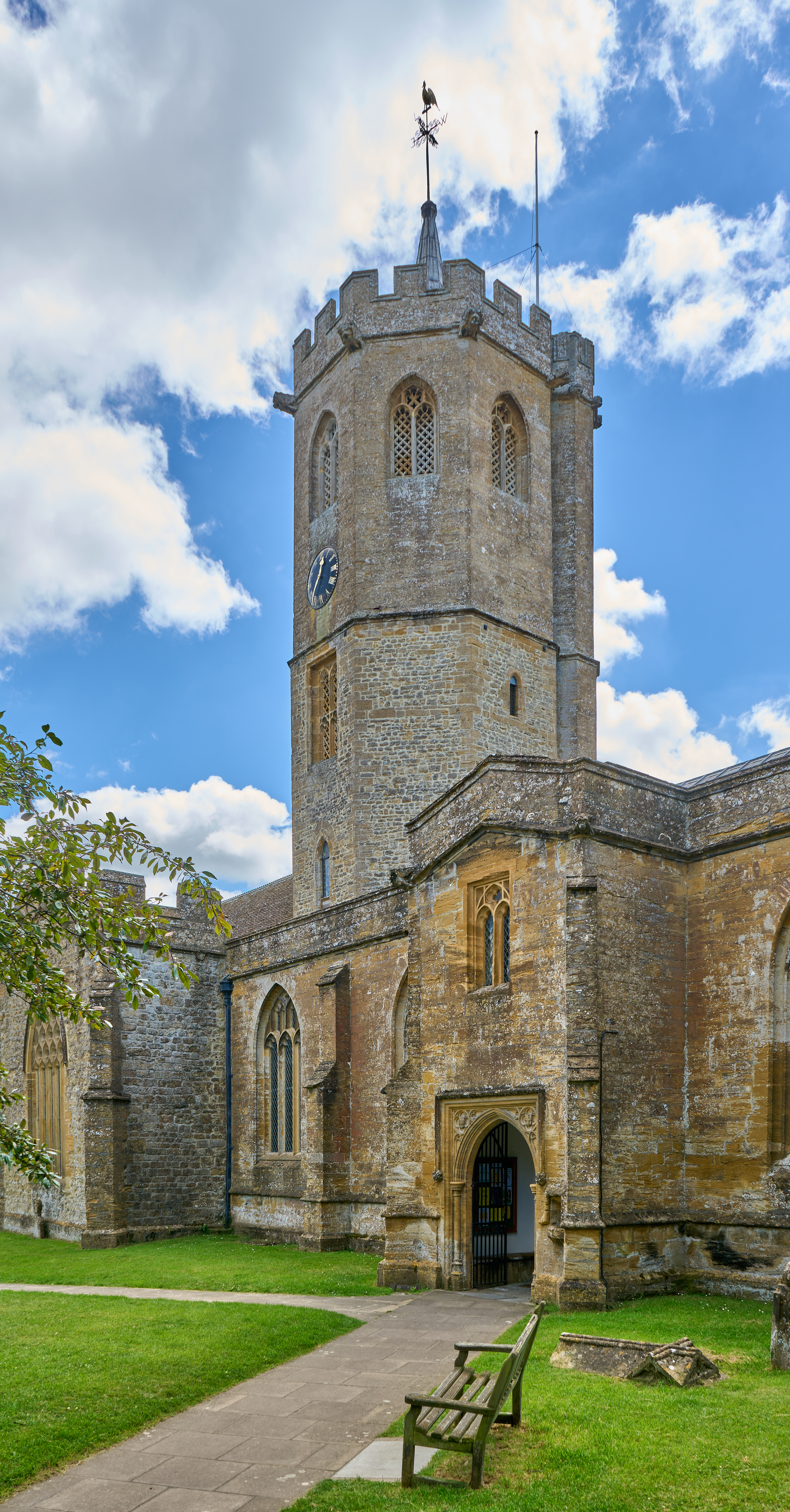
- Church from the north west, showing porch, north transept and octagonal central tower

- Location in Somerset
- Location: South Petherton, Somerset, England
- Denomination: Church of England

History
- Dedication: Peter the Apostle; Paul the Apostle

Architecture
- Functional status: Parish church
- Heritage designation: Grade I
- Designated: 19 April 1961
- Style: Gothic

Specifications
- Length: 130 ft (40 m)

Administration
- Province: Canterbury
- Diocese: Bath and Wells
- Archdeaconry: Taunton
- Deanery: Somerset South
- Parish: South Petherton with the Seavingtons and the Lambrooks

The Church of St Peter and St Paul is the Church of England parish church for the village of South Petherton, Somerset, England. The present church is a large and imposing cruciform-shaped structure constructed on the site of an earlier Saxon Minster, with the majority of the building dating from the 13th to 15th centuries; consequently, the building is Grade I listed.

The church is notable for its Gothic architecture, stained glass windows, monuments and rare octagonal central tower, reputed to be the tallest of its kind in Britain.

== History ==
=== Pre-conquest ===
South Petherton grew up around the Fosse Way, a major Roman road built in the 1st and 2nd centuries from Isca Dumnoniorum (modern-day Exeter) to Lindum Colonia (modern-day Lincoln), which crosses Somerset less than a mile from the site of the present village. It is likely that a Saxon monastery or minster was established here to oversee the various chapels in the hundred of the same name, as referenced by papal letters of the age.

=== 11th and 12th centuries ===
By the time of the Norman Conquest, the land at South Petherton was owned by William the Conqueror himself and was passed to several succeeding monarchs over the following decades. In the latter stages of the reign of King Stephen (c. 1143 - 1154), he gave the land he owned, which included the village and the now-former monastery, to Wells Cathedral, along with the village of North Curry.

In 1181 or 1182, Henry II gave the church itself directly to Bruton Abbey, becoming a cell of that abbey until the Dissolution of the Monasteries. It is likely that the church began to be gradually rebuilt from its Saxon and Norman form into a Gothic structure during the 12th century, probably using funds from the abbey. Surviving 12th century rubble in the chancel walls indicates this may have been rebuilt first.

=== Gothic rebuilding ===
Two programmes of rebuilding in the Gothic style took place between the 13th and 15th centuries. The first one, likely in the latter half of the 13th century, continued the work to the chancel at the end of the 12th century in the Early English Gothic style. The lower part of the tower below the level of the roof, including the four crossing piers, were also begun at this time.

A more substantial period of rebuilding took place in the 14th and 15th centuries, with the reconstruction of the north transept and south porch in the 14th century, and the heightening of the tower and completion of the nave in the 15th century.

=== 17th and 18th centuries ===
The lead roof of the chancel was reported to be in ruins by 1636; the discovery of a lead-lined tomb in the church saw it reappropriated for the purposes of renewing the roof. Damage to the windows of the chancel and north nave aisle by Parliamentary troops in 1644 caused the loss of most of the medieval glass and the destruction of the organ. The organ was not renewed until 1715.

=== 19th century restorations ===
Extensive restoration of the church was undertaken in stages during the 19th century. The first stage, carried out from 1859 to 1860, involved completing reseating the church and the galleries, and the replacement of many of the fittings, such as the lectern and pulpit. The south transept, which had been supplied with a chimney and grate since 1799, became the vestry, replacing the eastern end of the chancel, which until that time, had been used for the same purpose. This first stage of work was carried out by Hicks and Isaacs of Bristol.

The second, more robust period of restoration was carried out between 1882 and 1890 by noted Victorian architect Arthur Bloomfield. This involved the complete renewing of the fabric of the building, most notably adding a vivid painting to the east wall of the nave above the tower arch; the restoration of the south porch following in 1890. The galleries around the walls were also removed at this time.

The final stage involved the restoration of the tower itself in 1895, carried out jointly by architects J. D. Sedding and H. Wilson.

== Architecture ==
=== Plan and layout ===
Similar to the majority of medieval parish churches in England, the church is in the traditional cruciform layout, with four arms meeting in the middle, topped by a tower. The church is approximately 40 metres (130 ft) in length and has an area of 761 square metres (8,190 sq ft). This makes it, according to Church of England categories, a "large" church building. (Note: The Church of England's Church Heritage Record website puts church buildings into categories based on their size. Under 200 sq m is considered to be small, 200-599 sq m is medium, 600-999 sq m is large, and anything over 1,000 is very large.)

The church has a four-bay aisled nave, with north and south porches to the aisles, north and south transepts, and a two-bay chancel. The central tower is unusual for two reasons, firstly that it has a square base below the roof ridge but an octagonal plan above this, and secondly that the octagon is wider east-west than it is north-south, due to the irregularity of the length of the sides.

=== Exterior ===
Situated on a small hill, the highest point of the village, the church is a significant landmark in the local area. The chief external feature is the tall but irregular octagonal crossing tower, reputed to be the tallest example of such a structure in the country. The tower is 21 feet (6.4 m) wide east-west, though less so from north to south, as noted by Pevsner. The tower has two external stages above the roofline, with string courses, battlemented parapets and angle gargoyles. There is a stair turret rising the full height of the tower in the southwest corner. The tower is topped by a small lead-covered spirelet and wrought-iron weathervane.

The nave aisles also have string courses like the tower, although with a plain rather than battlemented parapets. Buttresses separate each bay of the nave but do not quite reach the parapet in height. The aisles have wide 15th century three-light windows in recesses, the west windows to the aisles match. There is no clerestory, so the central aisle of the nave is only visible on the west gable, which has a large five-light Perpendicular Gothic traceried window with a transom above a blocked doorway.

The nave aisles both have porches. The south porch is a 14th century construction, larger in footprint than its northern counterpart but without the second storey. The south porch has a moulded arch with bell capitals, a stone sexpartite vault and late 13th century inner doorway. The north porch is a 15th century construction, smaller in footprint than the north but with a second storey. It has angled corner buttresses, moulded arches and a two-light arched window in the upper stage.

The north transept, of two bays, has angled corner buttresses and a battlemented parapet. The transept has two five-light windows, that of the north face being of the reticulated traceried design; the window in the east face is flat-arched, also with reticulated tracery. The south transept is one bay, and has a similar design to the chancel, with chamfered plinths, simple parapet and full-height corner buttresses.

The exterior, much like the rest of the village, is constructed mainly from Ham stone, with clay tiles to the roof of the chancel and south porch, with lead sheeting to the rest.

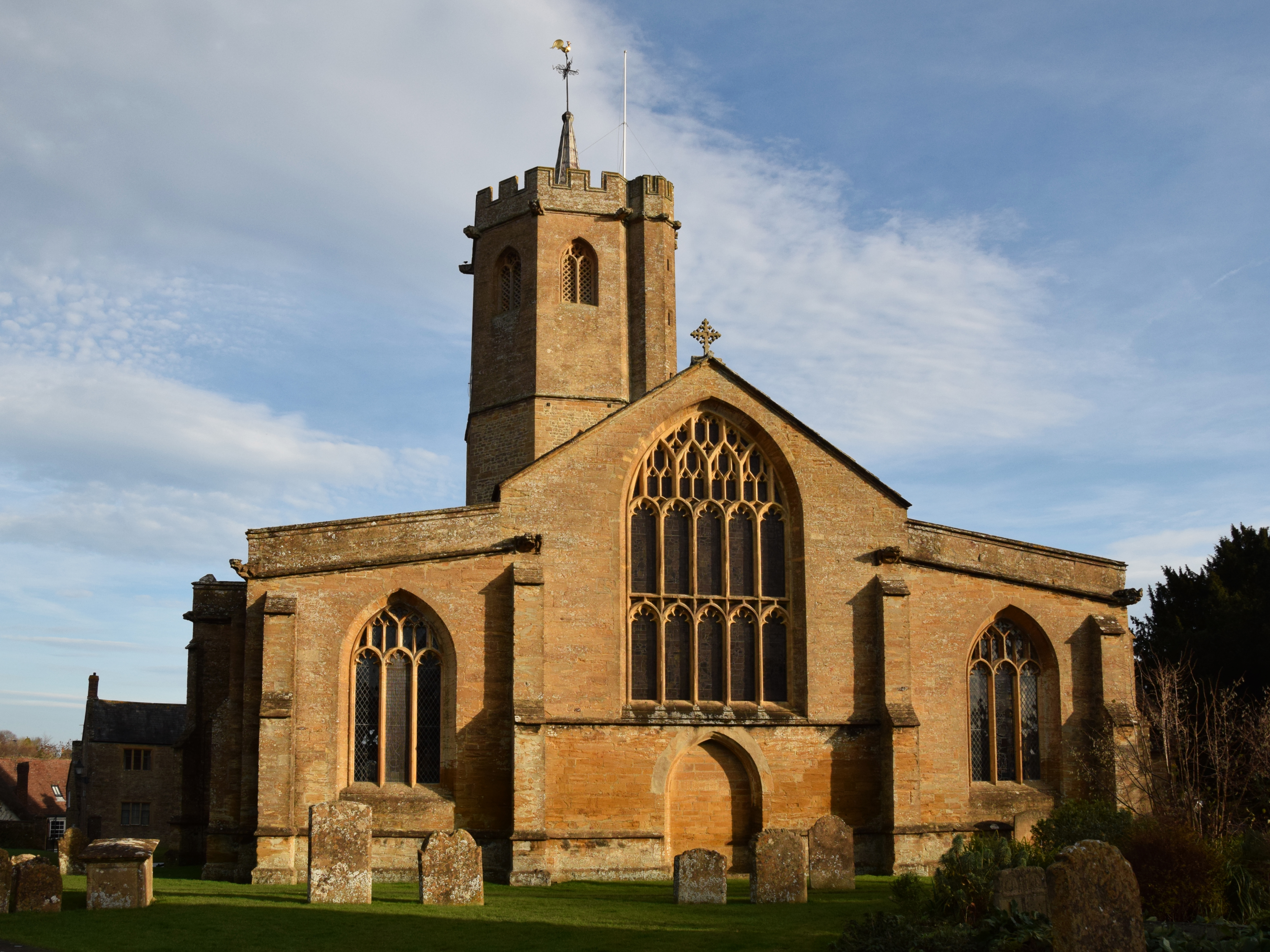
Church from the west

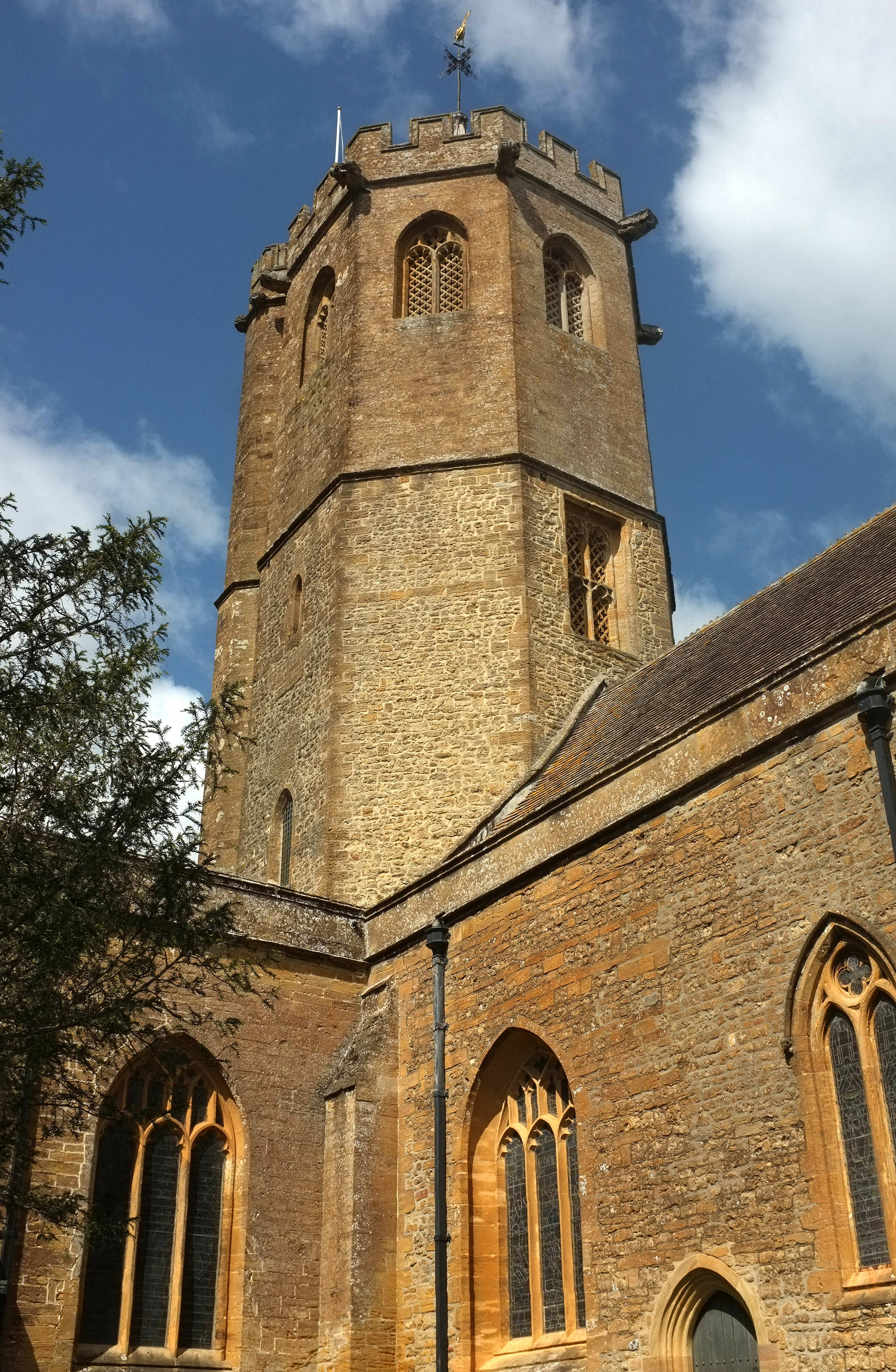
Detail on crossing tower

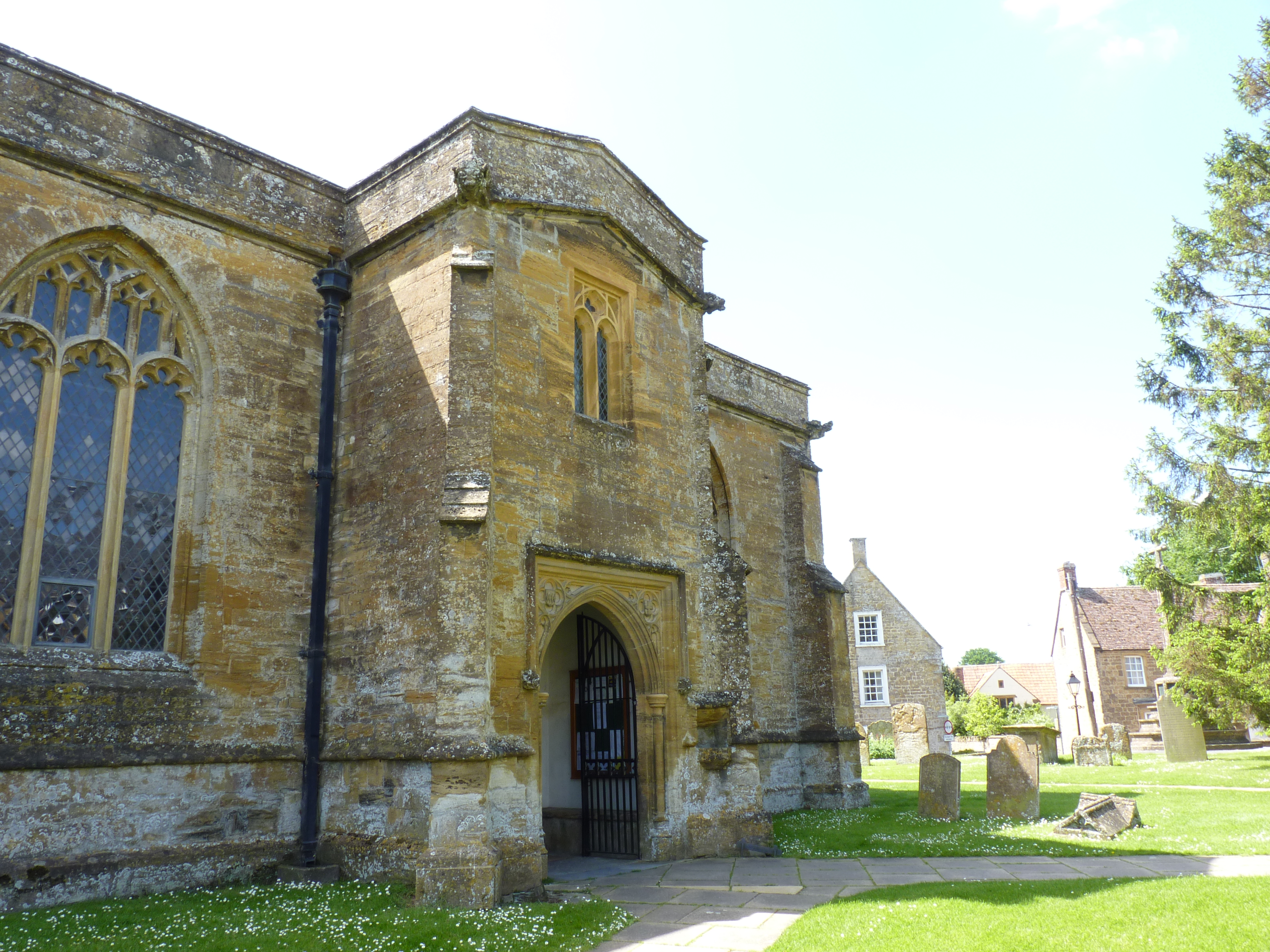
North porch

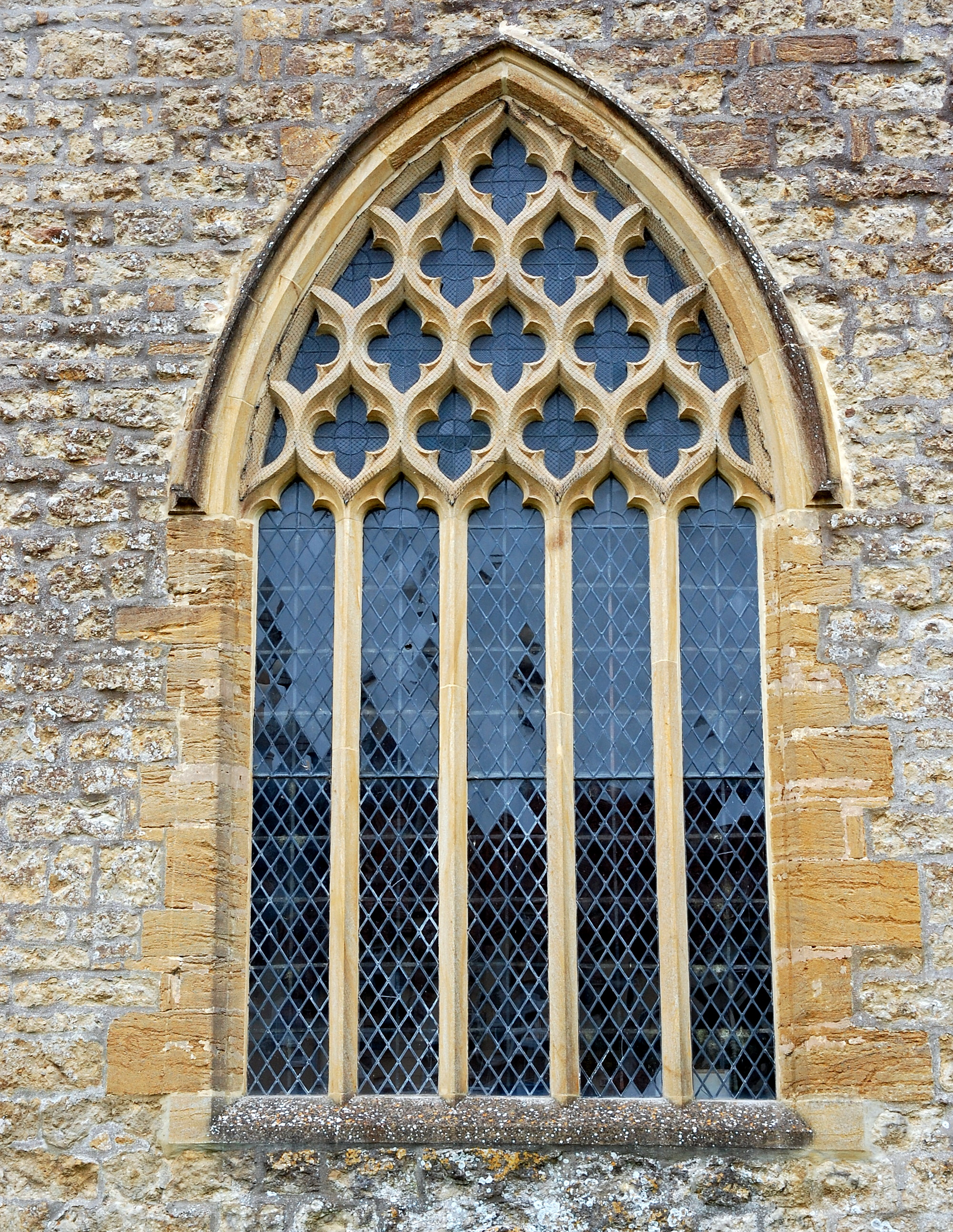
North transept window

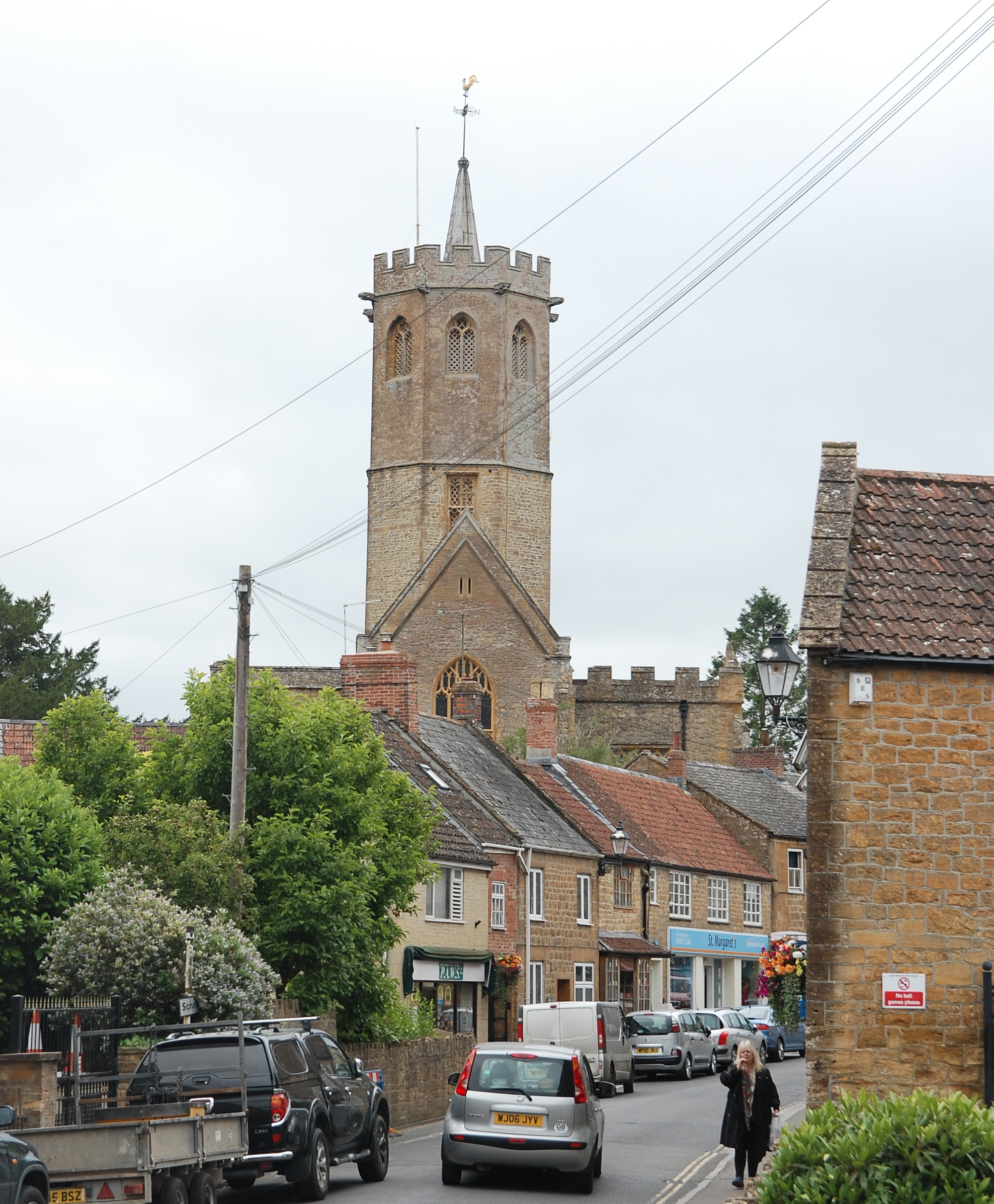
Church from the east

=== Interior ===
The interior, which Pevsner describes as "spacious", is split into several parts. The nave is wide, with two aisles nearly as high as the central nave, similar to a hall church. The nave arcade is from the 15th century with hollow columns, the ceilings above them being late 19th century. The crossing, separated from the rest of the church by 13th century crossing arches, has a highly unusual octopartite tierceron stone vault in a radial pattern around the bell hatch. The vault is much lower than the roof of the nave, and so the gap is filled by solid stone walls above the arches, that of the western wall facing the nave painted with a vivid display of God and several angels, painted in the late 19th or early 20th century. The chancel has a wooden ceiling dating back to 1882 by Bloomfield, with a cinquefoil-cusped piscina and blocked hagioscope to the north transept.

The church has numerous monuments, including to Giles Daubeney, William Ayshe, Samuel Cabel and Jacob Ayshe, all in the north transept. The stained glass is also of note, mostly by Nicholson, depicting several local landmarks including Barrow Mump, Glastonbury Abbey and Sherborne Abbey. There is a moderately sized two-manual pipe organ, located under the tower vaulting, by W. G. Vowles of Bristol, though the date of its construction is unknown. The organ has 22 speaking stops.

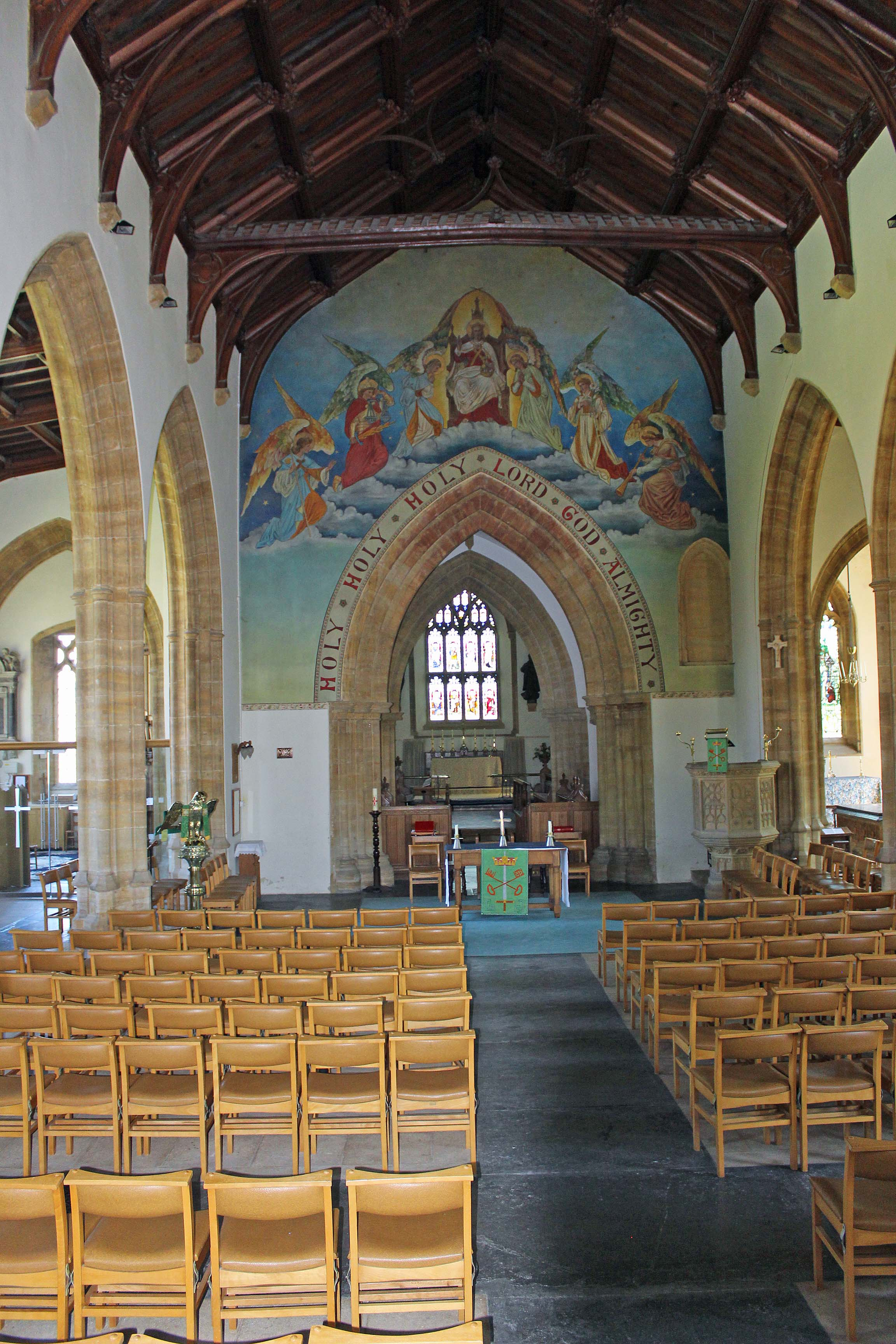
Nave, showing wall painting

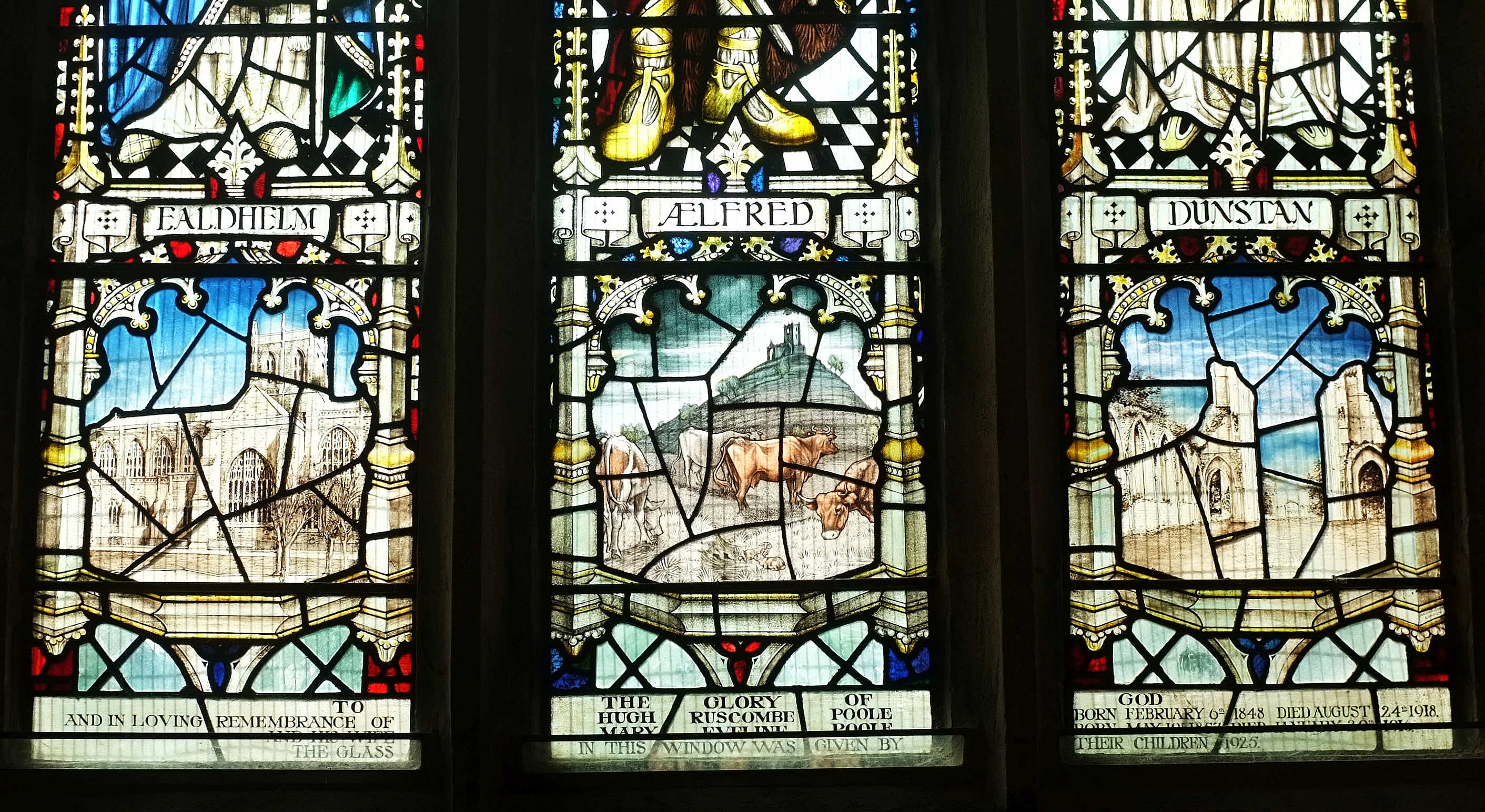
Window in south nave aisle, with Sherborne Abbey (left), Barrow Mump (middle) and Glastonbury Abbey (right)

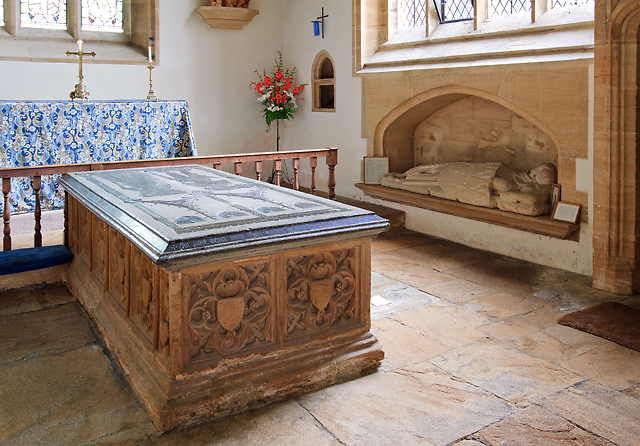
Tomb chest of Sir Giles Daubeney

== Bells ==
=== History ===
The first bells at South Petherton were a ring of six, cast by John Wiseman of nearby Montacute in 1641. Several of these bells were recast over the following centuries, the 3rd by the prominent Bilbie family of Chew Stoke in 1713, the tenor in 1721, also by Bilbie, and then the 2nd in 1765, again by Bilbie. The 5th was recast by William Jefferies of Bristol in 1832.

The bells, then a heavy ring of six, were rehung in 1896 by Thomas Blackbourn of Salisbury in a new timber frame for eight bells. Two new treble bells, cast by Mears & Stainbank of Whitechapel, London, completed the augmentation to eight, also in 1896. Blackbourn provided new fittings for all the bells, including new wheels, timber headstocks, plain bearings and wrought-iron clappers.

Blackbourn's frame was installed right at the top of the tower, and as such over the course of the 20th century, the ease with which the bells were able to be rung decreased, due to the long length of rope between the ringers and the bells, the outdated fittings and the poor tonal qualities of the bells, compared to what was being generated by the leading foundries. The 6th bell was recast again in the 20th century, by Llewellins & James of Bristol in 1919.

As such, during a meeting of the ringers in 1994, a working group was formed to investigate the possibility of restoring or even recasting the ring. Advice from the bell foundries and bell hanging firms confirmed that six of the eight bells were too out of tune to be successfully retuned, and though the frame could be altered to make the bells easier to ring, the costs would be high. A report was prepared to make the case for recasting the bells but had to be postponed due to the illness of the vicar.

In the late 1990s, a Millennium Fund was up by the Central Council of Church Bell Ringers and National Heritage Lottery, with a pool of £3,000,000 for bell restoration projects. The news of this funding meant the project to replace the bells could be restarted. The church gave permission for the project to go ahead, providing the ringers could raise all the money themselves due to ongoing projects in the village requiring money more urgently. English Heritage gave permission for the bells to be replaced, providing the frame was preserved in the tower and the historically significant 3rd bell, cast in 1641, was kept. This gave the opportunity to install a new frame lower in the tower for a new peal of twelve bells to be cast. The order was placed with John Taylor & Co of Loughborough, with the bells to be hung by Eayre and Smith. The heaviest ten bells were to be cast to the same dimensions as the ring at Christ Church, Swindon, Wiltshire, which were also cast by Taylor's, in 1924.

When the old bells left the tower for Taylor's foundry in December 1997, the tenor bell was found to weigh about a quarter of a ton lighter than first thought, at 19 long cwt (965 kg). New homes were found for the treble, which went to Horton-in-Ribblesdale in North Yorkshire; the 2nd, which was hung in Holy Trinity, Horfield, Bristol to replace a cracked bell; the 6th went to Barrow in Furness, Cumbria; and the tenor to St Charles of Borromeo, Detroit, United States. The 4th was found to be cracked and was used to help develop bell-welding techniques; the 5th and 7th bells were scrapped.

The new bells, cast in 1998, still hang in the church tower today, with the tenor weighing 22 long cwt 3 qr 15 lb (2,563 lb or 1,163 kg) and striking the note D. The bells were hung in a new cast iron and steel frame 25 feet (7.6 m) lower than Blackbourn's frame, which still survives today with the former 3rd bell preserved within it. The project cost £150,000, supported by a generous grant from the Millennium Fund. A thirteenth bell was cast by Taylor's in 2007, called a "flat sixth", it sits between the 6th and 7th bells in the ring, and provides the option of a lighter ring of eight within the ring of twelve for purposes of teaching. A ring of twelve in a village church is unusual, and as such the tower at South Petherton is a teaching hub for South Somerset.

=== Record length peal ===
In 2012, discussions began between the tower captain and the church authorities to ring a longer length peal for charity. The tower captain had himself been in a successful record attempt, comprising 16,368 changes of the method 'Cambridge Surprise Maximus', rang at St Philip's Cathedral in Birmingham on 15 May 1965, rung in 11 hours and 29 minutes. At the time, this was the longest continuous ringing of twelve bells ever attempted by a single band of ringers, and though it had been surpassed only once at All Saints Church in Worcester in 1987, it was still the longest peal in the method, the peal at Worcester being in a different method.

Following the fitting of additional soundproofing, an attempt took place at South Petherton at breaking the record set at Worcester in 1987 took place in October 2014, though it failed after 4 hours of ringing due to two bells shifting positions unexpectedly. A second attempt took place on 17 October 2015, beginning shortly after 7 a.m and finishing at 9.30 p.m. The peal was live-streamed in the church throughout the day, and when it was completed, many of the 200 people in the church gave loud applause. The peal was successful, comprising 21,216 changes of Cambridge Surprise Maximus taking 14 hours and 26 minutes to ring, becoming the longest ever peal on twelve bells. The ringers came from across the UK, as far afield as Birmingham, Bedfordshire and Oxfordshire.

The record at South Petherton was itself broken two years later at St Anne's, Alderney, in the Channel Islands, comprising 25,056 changes of Bristol Surprise Maximus in 16 hours and 7 minutes on 25 October 2017. The peal at South Petherton remains the second-longest on twelve bells, and still holds the record for the longest peal of Cambridge. A large peal board hung on the wall in the ringing room records the event.

== See also ==
- List of towers in Somerset
- List of ecclesiastical parishes in the Diocese of Bath and Wells
- List of Grade I listed buildings in South Somerset
- Change ringing
