= South Petherton =

Village and civil parish in Somerset, England

Coordinates: 50.949°N 2.809°W

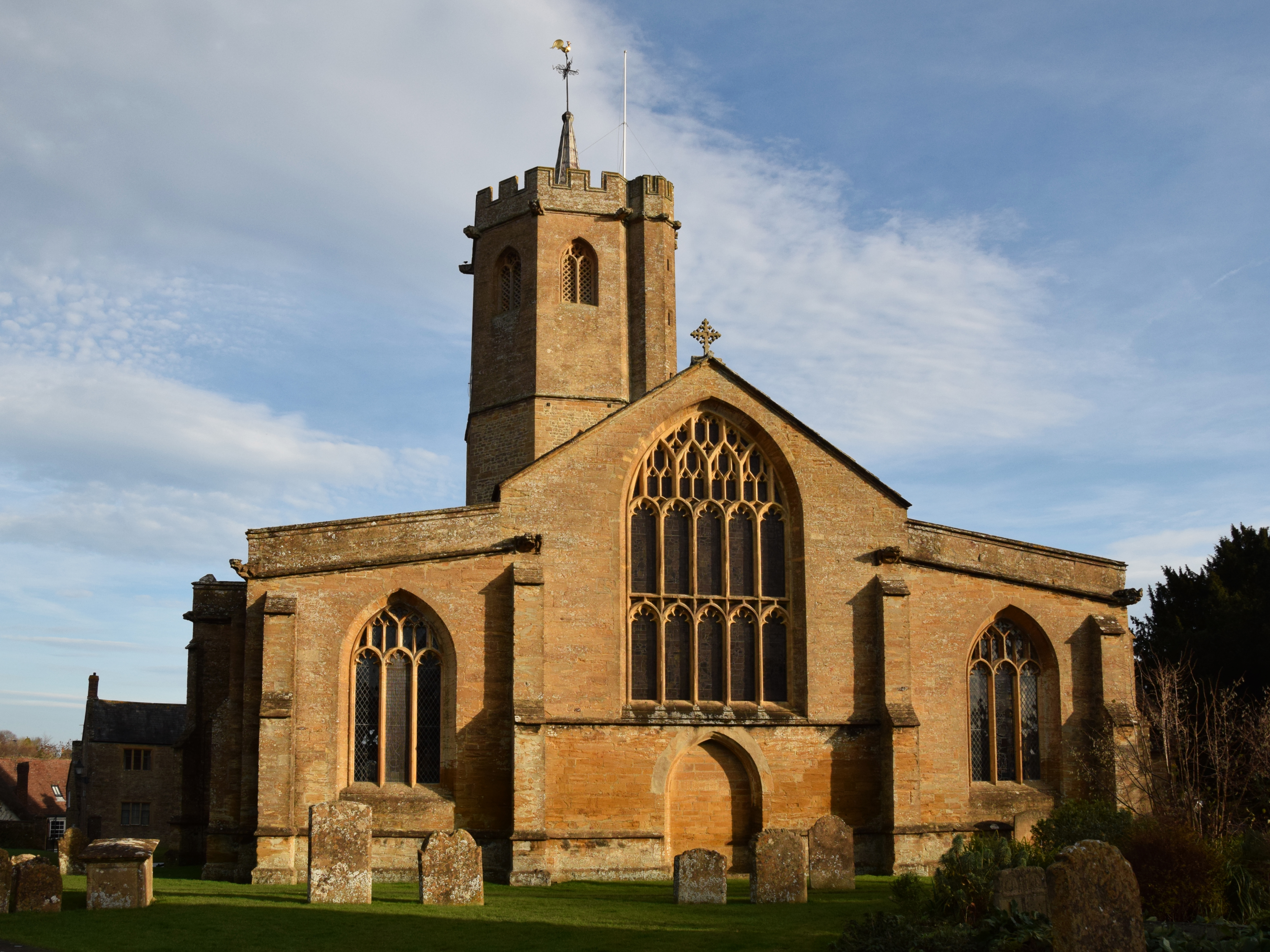
- Church of St Peter and St Paul showing the octagonal tower.

- Location within Somerset
- Population: 3,737
- OS grid reference: ST435165
  - London: 131 mi (211 km) ENE
- Civil parish: South Petherton
- Unitary authority: Somerset Council
- Ceremonial county: Somerset
- Region: South West
- Country: England
- Sovereign state: United Kingdom
- Post town: SOUTH PETHERTON
- Postcode district: TA13
- Dialling code: 01460
- Police: Avon and Somerset
- Fire: Devon and Somerset
- Ambulance: South Western
- UK Parliament: Yeovil

South Petherton is a large village and civil parish in Somerset, England, located 5 miles (8 km) east of Ilminster and 5 miles (8 km) north of Crewkerne. The parish had a population of 3,737 in 2021 and includes the smaller village of Over Stratton and the hamlets of Compton Durville, Drayton, Wigborough and Yeabridge. The River Parrett forms the eastern boundary of the parish. The village is approximately 2 miles (3 km) from East Lambrook, Martock and Lopen.

The village is distinctive for the traditional hamstone construction of many of its buildings. In 2005 South Petherton was awarded ‘Somerset Village of the Year’ in a national competition. Historically South Petherton was a market town, but these days is regarded as a village, with many of its ancient functions including the holding of a market having ended by around 1870, although some town-like characteristics remain.

== History ==
The village's name may come from the Old English word Pared meaning boundary and the Saxon word ton meaning settlement, forming ’Paredton’.

A site on Lightgate Road, north of the present village, has produced Iron Age occupation material, though archaeological evidence of any structures have not yet been discovered. Roman material, mostly consisting of coins, has also been discovered locally and, as it is only 2 miles (3 km) from the Fosse Way, Roman occupation is likely, although it may have been abandoned between the 4th and 8th centuries.

The Anglo-Saxon Chronicle of 680 refers to a major battle on the site of the village and the Saxon Ine of Wessex of the Kingdom of Wessex built a palace on present day Silver Street.

A large royal estate of South Petherton was created and the Saxon settlement, Sudperetone (the southern tun on the Parrett), included a minster church, a royal palace and a short-lived 11th century mint. Most of the royal estate passed directly to William the Conqueror and was still a possession of the Crown in 1086. The parish was part of the South Petherton Hundred. Part of the estate was also held by Bruton Abbey from the 12th century until the Dissolution of the Monasteries, then becoming known as the manor of Hele. In 1213 a royal warrant by King John was granted for a market and fair, but by 1243 the main manor had been granted away from the Crown under Henry II and by 1243 South Petherton manor was owned outright by the Daubeney family, who continued to hold it until the late 15th century, the family dying out after Henry Daubeney acquired the earldom of Bridgwater and then failed to produce an heir to succeed him.

The manor reverted to the Crown in 1553, before passing into the ownership of Charles Arundell (d. 1587), who left it to his brother Matthew Arundell, in whose family it remained until 1792, when it was sold to John Baker Edmonds. Edmonds also acquired the rectory estate of South Petherton (known also as the manor of Hele), which had had a complicated history of ownership, including purchase in 1753 by Henry Hele, a successful physician from Salisbury.

Another estate (known as the Manor of Wigborough) was shared by members of the Brome Family from 1581 to 1615, when it passed to the family of Hele of Flete (unconnected to the Henry Hele referred to above) who held it for most of the 17th century.

During the English Civil War troops from both sides occupied the town during 1644 and 1645. The town also had a role in the Monmouth Rebellion of 1680 and two townsmen were among those who prosecuted in the Bloody Assizes.

It was also recently discovered that South Petherton was, during the 17th century, one of the main centres of bronze cauldron and skillet production. These cooking vessels were used all over the UK.

== Governance ==
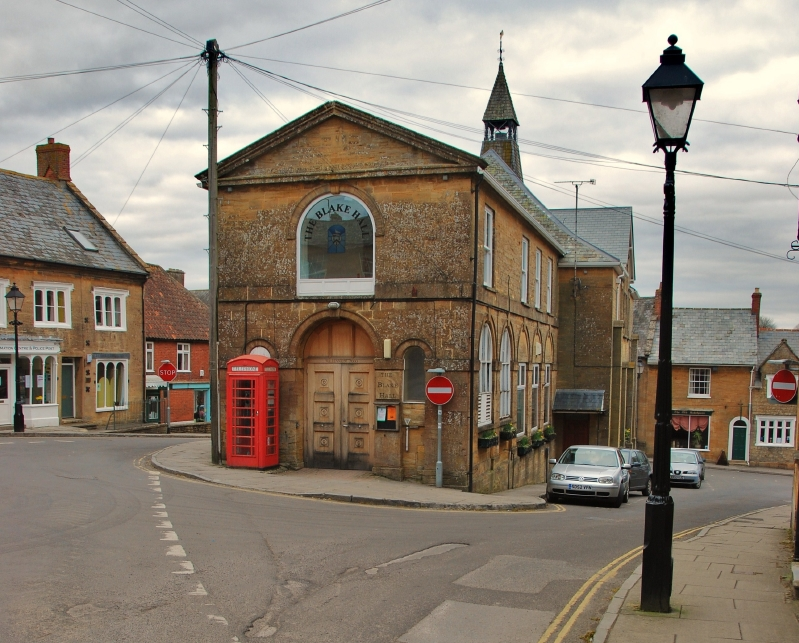
William Blake Memorial Hall, at the old market place, is where the parish council meets

As a civil parish, South Petherton has its own parish council with responsibility for local issues, including setting an annual precept (local rate) to cover the council's operating costs and producing annual accounts for public scrutiny. The parish council evaluates local planning applications and works with the local police, district council officers, and neighbourhood watch groups on matters of crime, security, and traffic. The council's role also includes initiating projects for the maintenance and repair of parish facilities, as well as consulting with the district council on the maintenance, repair, and improvement of highways, drainage, footpaths, public transport, and street cleaning. Conservation matters (including trees and listed buildings) and environmental issues are also the responsibility of the council.

For local government purposes, since 1 April 2023, the parish comes under the unitary authority of Somerset Council. Prior to this, it was part of the non-metropolitan district of South Somerset (established under the Local Government Act 1972). It was part of Yeovil Rural District before 1974.

Yeovil is a county constituency represented in the House of Commons of the Parliament of the United Kingdom. It elects one Member of Parliament (MP) by the first past the post system of election. The constituency covers the towns of Yeovil, Chard, Crewkerne and Ilminster in Somerset. Since July 2024 the MP is Adam Dance, a member of the Liberal Democrats and a resident of the village, and parish and county councillor.

An electoral ward in the same name exists. South Petherton is the most populous area the ward, which also includes Shepton Beauchamp and Seavington St. Mary. The total ward population at the 2011 census was 4,866.

== Geography ==
South Petherton is situated between the Blackdown Hills to the west, the flat wetland area of the Somerset Levels and Moors to the north, and the hills of Dorset to the south. 3 miles (4.8 km) to the east, on the other side of the Parrett valley, is Ham Hill, the source of much of the village's building stone.

It lies on low lying undulating land of Yeovil Sands at the foot of a limestone ridge, which has been quarried for Petherton stone, and for sands and clays suitable for brick and tile making.

=== Climate ===
Along with the rest of South West England, South Petherton has a temperate climate which is generally wetter and milder than the rest of the country. The annual mean temperature is approximately 10 °C (50.0 °F). Seasonal temperature variation is less extreme than most of the United Kingdom because of the adjacent sea temperatures. The summer months of July and August are the warmest with mean daily maxima of approximately 21 °C (69.8 °F). In winter mean minimum temperatures of 1 °C (33.8 °F) or 2 °C (35.6 °F) are common. In the summer the Azores high pressure affects the south-west of England, however convective cloud sometimes forms inland, reducing the number of hours of sunshine. Annual sunshine rates are slightly less than the regional average of 1,600 hours. In December 1998 there were 20 days without sun recorded at Yeovilton. Most of the rainfall in the south-west is caused by Atlantic depressions or by convection. Most of the rainfall in autumn and winter is caused by the Atlantic depressions, which is when they are most active. In summer, a large proportion of the rainfall is caused by sun heating the ground leading to convection and to showers and thunderstorms. Average rainfall is around 700 mm (28 in). About 8–15 days of snowfall is typical. November to March have the highest mean wind speeds, and June to August have the lightest winds. The predominant wind direction is from the south-west.

== Economy ==
Agriculture has traditionally been an important local industry, although South Petherton has also been a centre for glove making, cider production and other cottage industries at various points in its history.

Cloth manufacture, continued into the late 18th and 19th century although this was largely replaced by sailcloth and then leather working. The importance of this industry can be seen by the number of mills which remain including; the former flax mill or granary in Hayes End, Joylers Mill, Shutlers Mill, and the former flax mill immediately north of Flaxdrayton Farmhouse.

== Landmarks ==
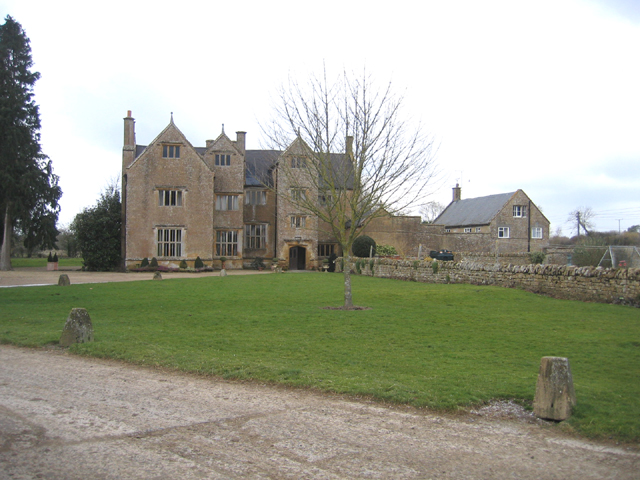
Wigborough Manor House

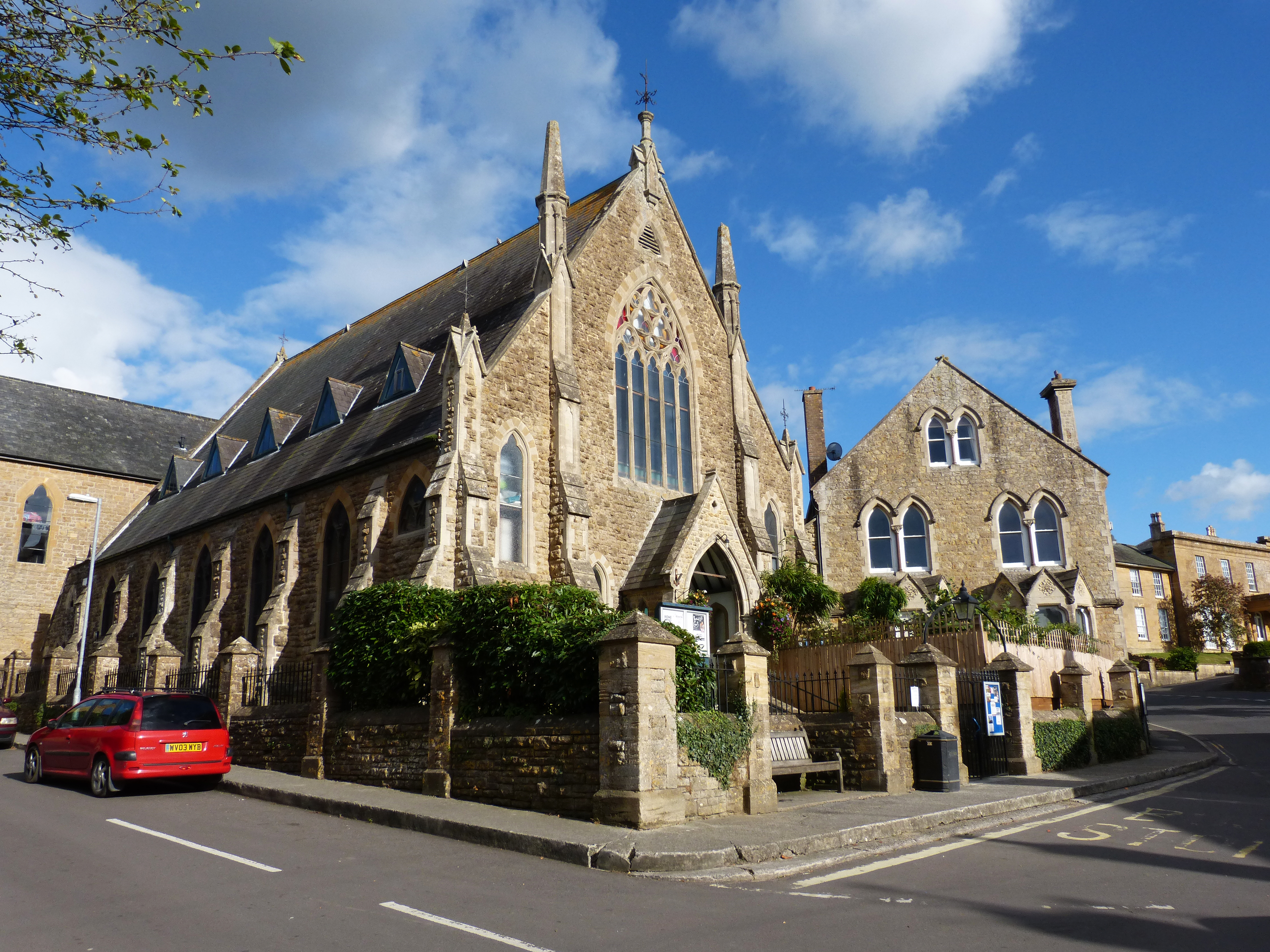
The David Hall

In Silver Street is a 14th-century manor house. It was restored in the 19th century and nicknamed 'King Ina's Palace'.

The 15th or 16th century Wigborough Manor House was never completed to its original plans and has subsequently been modified many times; it is a grade I listed building.

Approximately 1 mile (2 km) from South Petherton is East Lambrook Manor Gardens created by Margery Fish who was known as the 'Leading Lady of Gardening' from the 1950s until her death in 1969. It holds the national collection of geraniums, and a collection of snowdrops.

The "David Hall" (located in the old United Reformed Church) is a local social centre run by the Petherton Arts Trust, a non-profit making organisation formed in 1986 and registered as a charity in 1990. There is also "The Blake Hall" which has a social club downstairs and a hall upstairs where a market is held on the first Sunday of every month, as well as various other activities.

A Fives court wall survives, located just off Crown Lane, and is grade II listed.

== Health and Education ==
During 2007 Somerset Primary Care Trust consulted local residents about proposals for the redevelopment of South Petherton Community Hospital, which provides Out Patient Assessment and Reablement services. In March 2012, the new hospital was opened by Sophie, Countess of Wessex. A doctors' surgery and pharmacy are located adjacent to the Hospital, also in a new building.

Education is provided within the village by two nurseries for pre-school children, an infants’ school (ages 5–7) and a junior school (ages 7–11). The nearest secondary schools are in Stoke-sub-Hamdon (Stanchester Academy), Crewkerne (Wadham School) and Huish Episcopi (Huish Episcopi Academy). There is a public library.

== Transport ==
The A303 main road passes through the parish, immediately to the south of South Petherton and north of Over Stratton, and the villages can be accessed from the A303 at Hayes End Roundabout.

The nearest railway stations are Crewkerne and Yeovil. Formerly there were closer stations at Martock and Ilminster, but both of these were closed in the 1960s. South Petherton is served by a twice-daily Superfast coach service to and from London (Hammersmith) operated by Berrys Coaches as well as a regular bus service to Montacute, Stoke-sub-Hamdon and Yeovil.

National Cycle Network Route 339, which connects Langport with Route 33 at Barrington, passes through the village. The River Parrett Trail, a walking route that follows the course of the river, also passes through the village.

== Religious sites ==
The Church of England Church of St Peter and St Paul has Saxon origins. It retains a 13th-century crosswing, with the remainder of the buildings dating from the 15th century, however it underwent major restorations in the late 19th and early 20th centuries. It has been designated by English Heritage as a grade I listed building. The tower is an irregular octagon on plan, wider on east–west axis, which is believed to be the tallest octagonal church tower in the UK. It houses a ring of twelve bells.

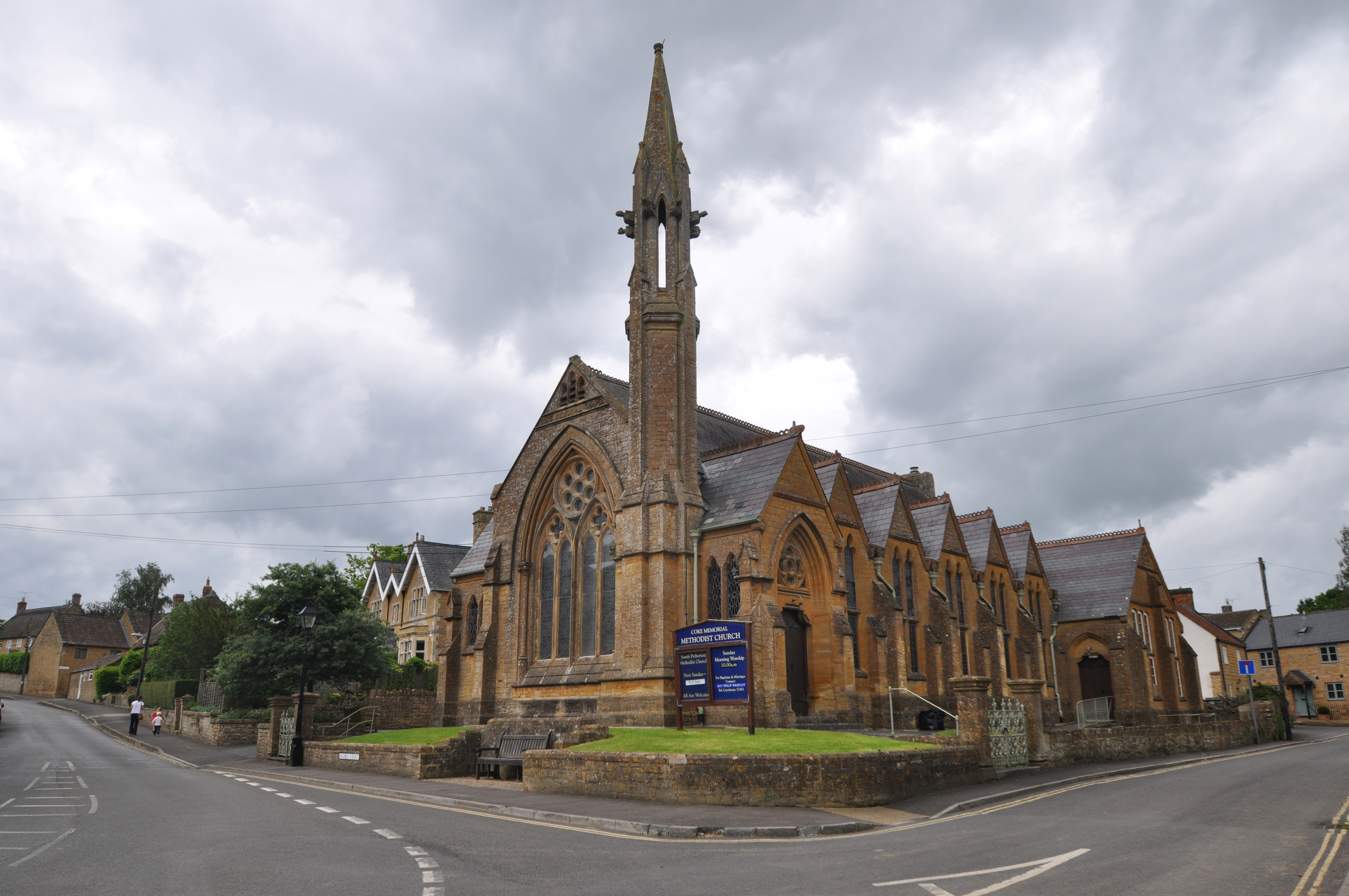
Methodist Church

The Coke Memorial Methodist Church was built in 1881–82 to replace an earlier chapel of 1809. It was named after Thomas Coke, who was curate of the village 1772-76 and important, along with John Wesley, amongst the founders of Methodism.

A United Reformed Church was built in 1863. This is now the 'David Hall' and hosts various public events.

The village also has a Roman Catholic church, dedicated to St Michael, located on Lightgate Road.

== Sports ==
The South Petherton Walking Group is aimed at the over 50's and aims to encourage this healthy, social activity amongst residents and visitors.

The Recreation Ground provides pitches for football and cricket clubs and there are also facilities for tennis and bowls and a children's play area. The football pitch is particularly large for the standard of football that the club compete in, being over 120 yards long and 90 yards wide. South Petherton Football Club were relegated from the Premier Division of the Perry Street & District League in 2013 after a highly successful run in recent years, but gained promotion at the first attempt and have since competed well back in the premier division.

The Vaux Park Polo Club are based at Wigborough Manor, using the grounds of the house, which is situated in the southeast corner of the parish.

== Notable people ==
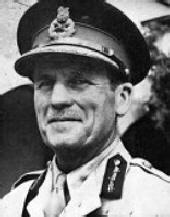
John Harding, 1st Baron Harding of Petherton

- John Harding, 1st Baron Harding of Petherton (1896–1989)
- John Brunner, science fiction author (1934–1995)
- John Weston Parsons Peters, soldier and administrator (1864-1924)

== See also ==
- North Petherton
