= Wigborough Manor House =

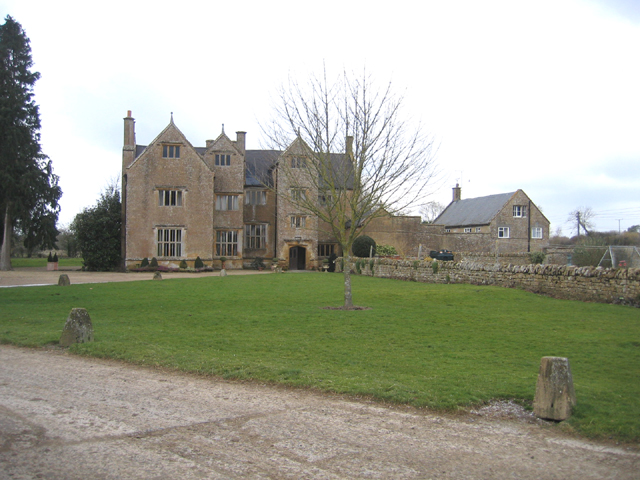

- Location within Somerset
- 50°55′59″N 2°47′13″W
- Location: South Petherton, Somerset, England

History
- Built: 1585

Listed Building – Grade I
- Designated: 19 April 1961
- Reference no.: 1056928

Wigborough Manor House is a manor house in South Petherton, Somerset, England. It was partly built in 1585, although it was never completed to the original designs and was subsequently modified. It has been designated as a Grade I listed building.

The estate was shared by members of the Brome Family from 1581 to 1615, when it passed to the family of Hele of Flete, who held it for most of the 17th century.

The house is built of local hamstone with Welsh slate roofs. The core the house consists of a screens passage with a gallery above it. When the house was built, there was a projecting garderobe turret; however, this has since been removed. Dendochronology of the wood forming the tie-beam and collar-beam trusses of the roof has shown that a construction date of 1585 is more likely than the previous estimates, which suggested an earlier date.

A two-storey house in the grounds was originally a brewhouse or dairy. It was built in the 19th century. There is also a former coach house from the 18th century. The cider house includes cellars and a loft. There are also various barns and stables, part of which dates from 1765. The boundary wall has sections which date from the 16th century; however, much of it was rebuilt in the 18th and 19th centuries.

The Vaux Park Polo Club has its headquarters at Wigborough Manor.

== See also ==
- List of Grade I listed buildings in South Somerset
