= Viešetė =

River in Lithuania

Coordinates: 56°17′N 22°17′E

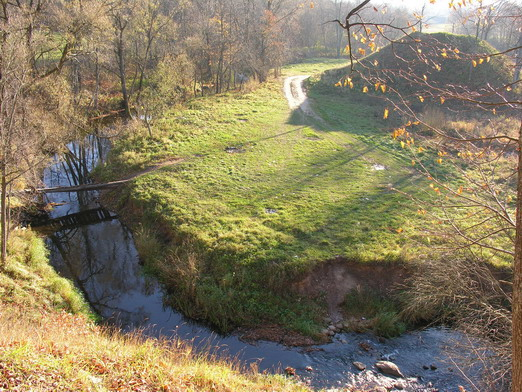
- The Viešetė passing by the Daubariai Hillforts

Location
- Country: Lithuania

Physical characteristics
- Source: Lake Balėnėlis
  - location: 9 km (5.6 mi) southeast of Seda
- Mouth: Venta
  - location: 2 km (1.2 mi) southwest of Mažeikiai
- Length: 23.6 km (14.7 mi)
- Basin size: 98 km^{2} (38 sq mi)
- Width
  - minimum: 4 m (13 ft)
  - average: 5 m (16 ft)
  - maximum: 6 m (20 ft)
- Discharge
  - location: Mouth
  - average: 0.86 cubic metres per second (860 L/s)

Basin features
- Tributaries
  - right: Balėnupis; Gailėšis; Stulpas

The Viešetė is a small river in Mažeikiai district, Tirkšliai eldership of Lithuania. It flows north from Lake Balėnėlis for 23.6 km (14.7 mi) until it reaches the larger Venta which it is a tributary of. It has three tributaries, the Balėnupis, Gailėšis, and the Stulpas.

== Course ==
The Viešetė passes by or near to the villages Kirkliai, Rubikai, Skuodiškiai, Šerkšnėnai, Spurganai, Tirkšliai, and Daubariai. Other sites of interest that it passes by are the Žalpių Stone and the Daubariai hillforts.

== Tributaries ==
- Balėnupis, length 6.9 km (4.3 mi), basin area 10.1 km^{2} (3.9 sq mi)
- Gailėšis, length 6.0 km (3.7 mi), basin area 16.4 km^{2} (6.3 sq mi)
- Stulpas, length 12.5 km (7.8 mi), basin area 17.1 km^{2} (6.6 sq mi)

== Ecology ==
Fish that are found in the river include Brown trout and Atlantic salmon. Other animals that inhabit the river are Eurasian beavers and Common toads.
