= Hillfort =

Fortified refuge or defended settlement on a rise of elevation

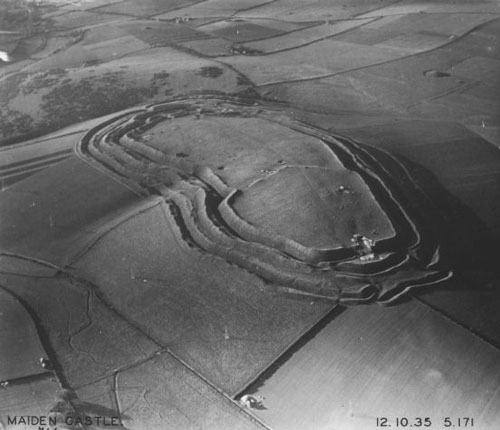
Maiden Castle in England is one of the largest hillforts in Europe. Photograph taken in 1935 by Major George Allen (1891–1940).

A hillfort is a type of fortified refuge or defended settlement located to exploit a rise in elevation for defensive advantage. They are typical of the late European Bronze Age and Iron Age. Some were used in the post-Roman period. The fortification usually follows the contours of a hill and consists of one or more lines of earthworks or stone ramparts, with stockades or defensive walls, and external ditches. If enemies were approaching, the inhabitants would spot them from a distance.

Prehistoric Europe saw a growing population. It has been estimated that in about 5000 BC, during the Neolithic period, between 2 million and 5 million people lived in Europe; in the Late Iron Age, Europe had an estimated population of around 15 to 30 million. Outside Greece and Italy, which were more densely populated, the vast majority of settlements in the Iron Age were small, with perhaps no more than 50 inhabitants. Hillforts were the exception, and were the home of up to 1,000 people. With the emergence of oppida in the Late Iron Age, settlements could reach as large as 10,000 inhabitants. As the population increased, so did the complexity of prehistoric societies. Around 1100 BC hillforts emerged and in the following centuries spread through Europe. They served a range of purposes and were variously tribal centres, defended places, foci of ritual activity, and places of production.

Hillforts were frequently occupied by conquering armies, but on other occasions the forts were destroyed, the local people forcibly evicted, and the forts left derelict. For example, Solsbury Hill was sacked and deserted during the Belgic invasions of southern Britain in the 1st century BC. Abandoned forts were sometimes reoccupied and refortified under renewed threat of foreign invasion, such as during the Dukes' Wars in Lithuania, and the successive invasions of Britain by Romans, Saxons and Vikings.

== Celtic hillforts ==
Celtic hillforts developed in the Late Bronze and Early Iron Age, roughly the start of the first millennium BC, and were used in many Celtic areas of central and western Europe until the Roman conquest. They are most common during later periods:

- The Proto-Celtic Urnfield culture and Atlantic Bronze Age (Bronze Age, c. 1300 BC – 750 BC)
- Hallstatt culture ( early Iron Age, c. 1200 BC – 500 BC)
- La Tène culture (late Iron Age, c. 600 BC – 50 AD)

The Hallstatt culture and La Tène culture originated in what is now southern Germany, Switzerland, Austria, Slovakia and the Czech Republic. The predominant form of rampart construction was pfostenschlitzmauer, or Kelheim-style. During the Hallstatt C period, hillforts became the dominant settlement type in the west of Hungary. Julius Caesar described the large Late Iron Age hillforts he encountered during his campaigns in Gaul as oppida. By this time the larger ones had become more like cities than fortresses and many were assimilated as Roman towns.

=== Great Britain ===
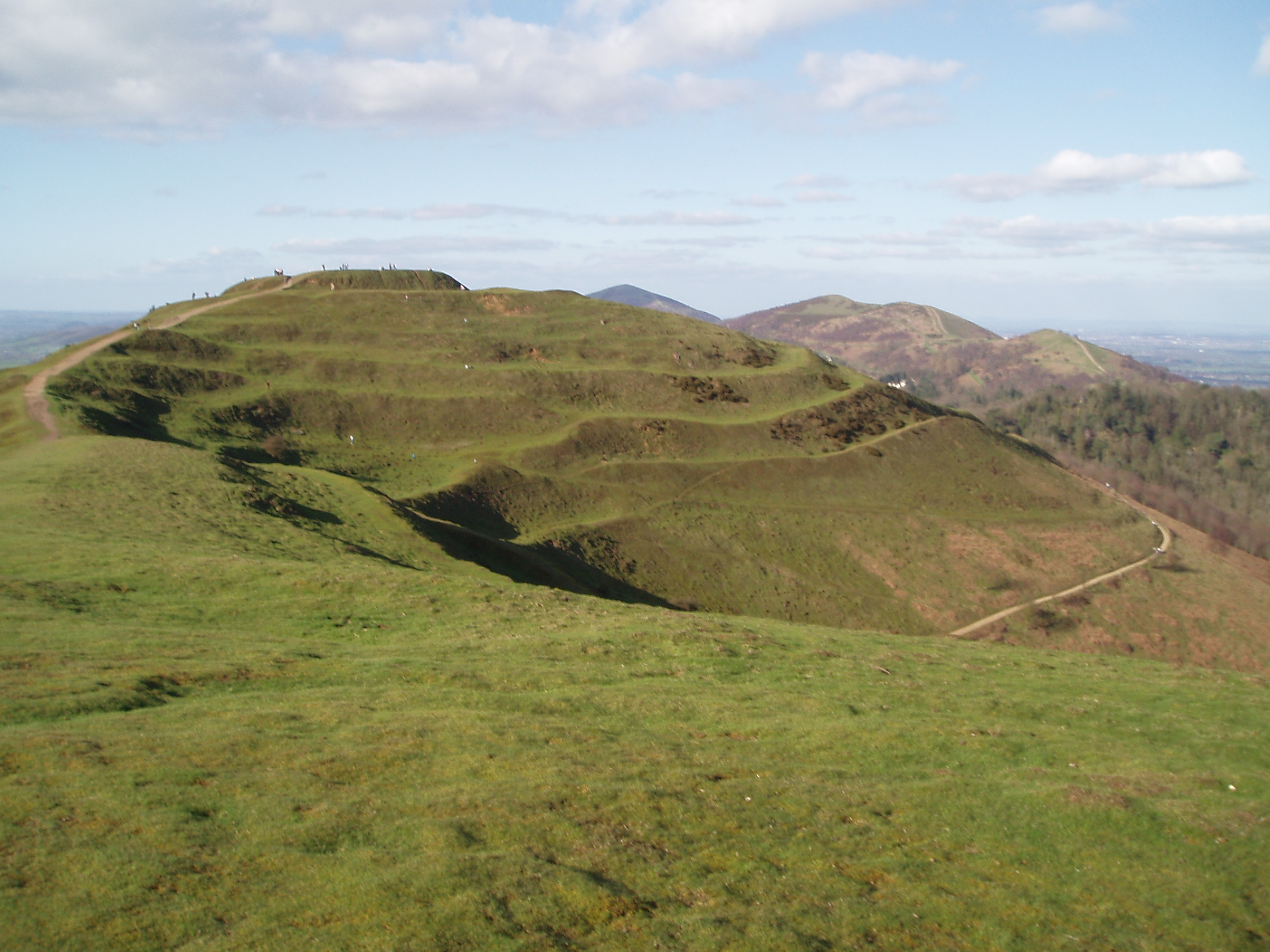
The ramparts of the multivallate British Camp in Herefordshire

The reason for the emergence of hillforts in Britain, and their purpose, has been a subject of debate. It has been argued that they could have been military sites constructed in response to invasion from continental Europe, sites built by invaders, or a military reaction to social tensions caused by an increasing population and consequent pressure on agriculture. The dominant view, since the 1960s, has been that the increasing use of iron led to social changes in Britain. Deposits of iron ore were not located in the same places as the tin and copper ore necessary to make bronze and, as a result, trading patterns shifted and the old elites lost their economic and social status. Power passed into the hands of a new group of people. Archaeologist Barry Cunliffe believes that population increase also played a role and has stated "[the forts] provided defensive possibilities for the community at those times when the stress [of an increasing population] burst out into open warfare. But I wouldn't see them as having been built because there was a state of war. They would be functional as defensive strongholds when there were tensions and undoubtedly some of them were attacked and destroyed, but this was not the only, or even the most significant, factor in their construction".

Hillforts in Britain are known from the Bronze Age, but the great period of hillfort construction was during the Celtic Iron Age, between 700 BC and the Roman conquest of Britain in 43 AD. The Romans occupied some forts, such as the military garrison at Hod Hill, and the temple at Brean Down, but others were destroyed and abandoned. Partially articulated remains of between 28 and 40 men, women and children at Cadbury Castle were thought by the excavator to implicate the Cadbury population in a revolt in the 70's AD (roughly contemporary with that of Boudicca in the East of England), although this has been questioned by subsequent researchers. However, the presence of barracks on the hilltop in the decades following the conquest suggest an ongoing struggle to suppress local dissent.

Maiden Castle in Dorset is one of largest hillforts in England. Where Roman influence was less strong, such as uninvaded Ireland and unsubdued northern Scotland, hillforts were still built and used for several more centuries. The largest hillfort can be found at Ham Hill in Somerset.

There are over 2,000 Iron Age hillforts known in Britain, of which nearly 600 are in Wales. Danebury in Hampshire, is the most thoroughly investigated Iron Age hillfort in Britain, as well as the most extensively published.

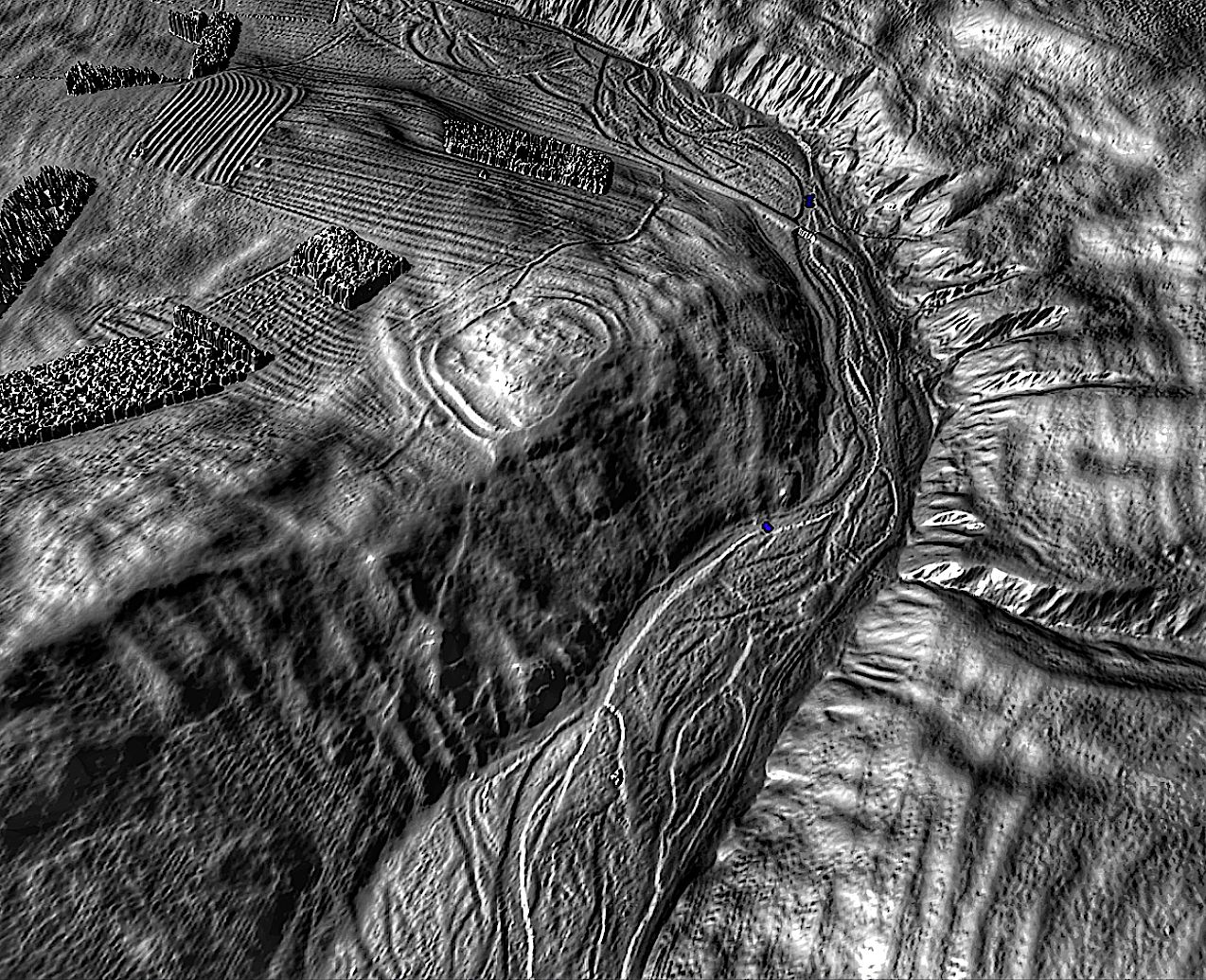
A lidar view of Camp Knowe Iron Age Hillfort in Northumberland.

Cadbury Castle, Somerset, is the largest fort reoccupied following the end of Roman rule to defend against pirate raids and the Anglo-Saxon invasions. The cemetery outside Poundbury Hill contains east-facing Christian burials of the 4th century CE. In Wales, the hillfort at Dinas Powys was a Late Iron Age hillfort reoccupied from the 5th-6th centuries CE; similarly at Castell Dinas Brân a hillfort of c. 600 BCE was reused in the Middle Ages, with a stone castle built there in the 13th century CE.

Some Iron Age hillforts were also incorporated into medieval frontier earthworks. For example Offa's Dyke, a linear earthwork generally dated to the 9th century CE, makes use of the west and south-west ramparts of Llanymynech hillfort. Similarly the hillfort at Old Oswestry was incorporated into the early medieval Wat's Dyke. The Wansdyke was a new linear earthwork connected to the existing hillfort at Maes Knoll, which defined the Celtic-Saxon border in south-west England during the period 577–652 CE.

Some hillforts were re-occupied by the Anglo-Saxons during the period of Viking raids. King Alfred established a network of coastal hillforts and lookout posts in Wessex, linked by a Herepath, or military road, which enabled his armies to cover Viking movements at sea. For example, see Daw's Castle and Battle of Cynwit.

It has been suggested on reasonable evidence that many so-called hillforts were just used to pen in cattle, horses, or other domesticated animals. The large sprawling examples at Bindon Hill and Bathampton Down are more than 50 acres (20 ha). Even those that were defensive settlements in the Iron Age were sometimes used for corralling animals in later periods. For example, see Coney's Castle, Dolebury Warren and Pilsdon Pen. However, it is difficult to prove that people definitely did not dwell there, as lack of evidence is not proof of absence.

=== Ireland ===
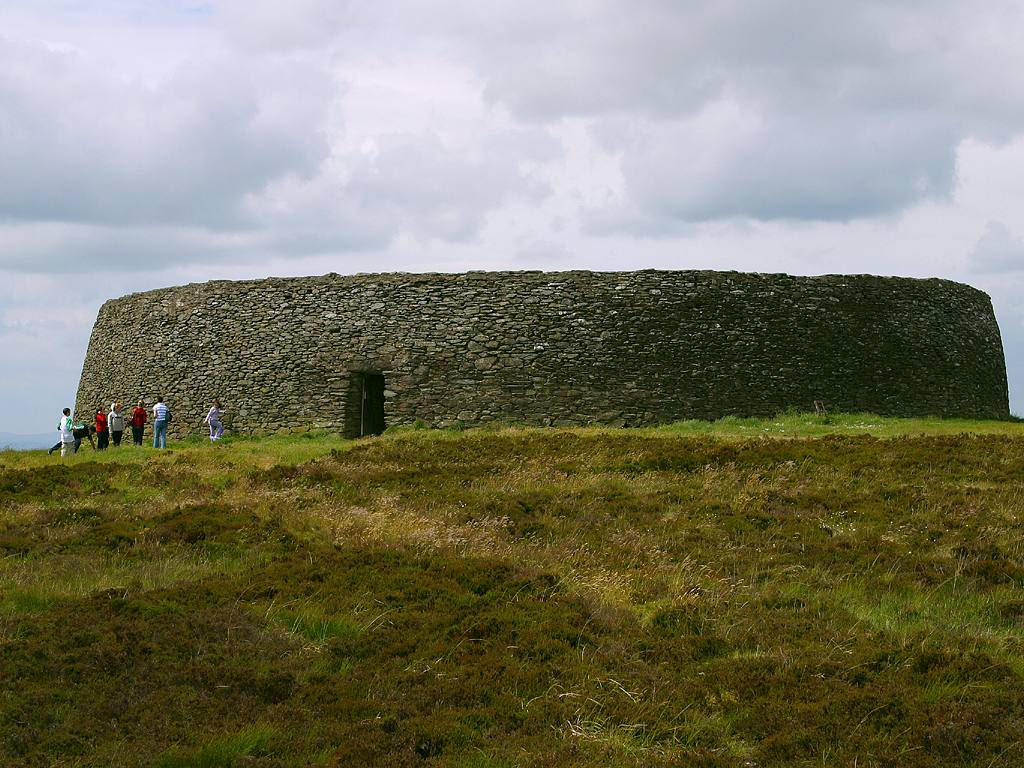
Exterior view of the Ringfort Grianan of Aileach situated in County Donegal

Bronze Age and Iron Age hillforts are widely found in Ireland, with more than 500 identified across the island. They are large circular structures between 1 and 40 acres (most commonly 5–10 acres) in size, enclosed by a stone wall or earthen rampart or both. These would have been important tribal centres where the chief or king of the area would live with his extended family and support themselves by farming and renting cattle to their underlings.

About 12 are multivallate, distinguished by multiple ramparts or a large counterscarp (outer bank). The imposing example at Mooghaun is defended by multiple stone walls.

One must be careful to not confuse a hillfort with a medieval 'ringfort', a common archaeological feature across the whole island of Ireland, of which over 40,000 examples are known; one source claims there may be 10,000 undiscovered ringforts.

== Other hillforts in Europe ==
=== Iberian Peninsula ===
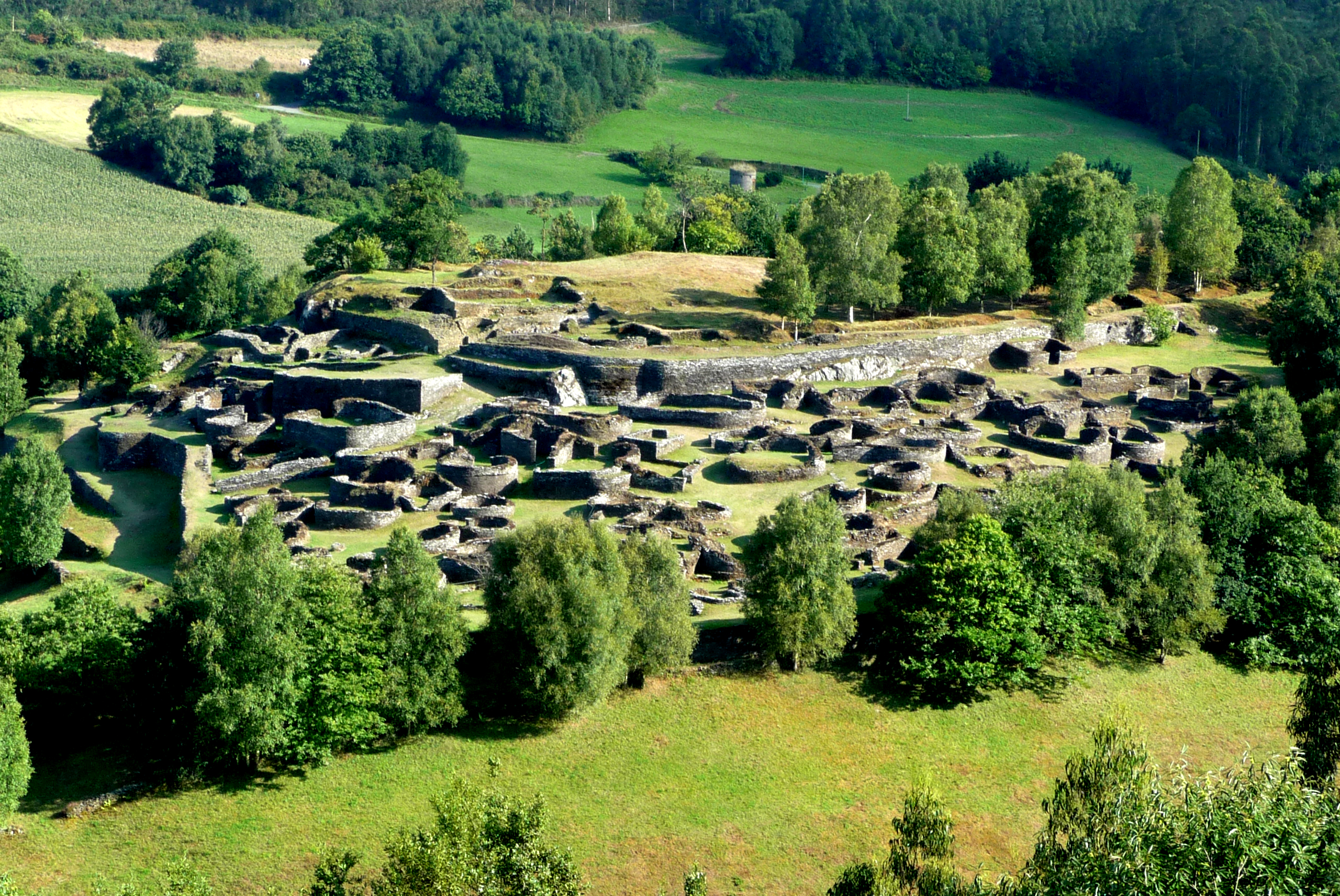
Hillfort at Coaña, Asturias, Spain

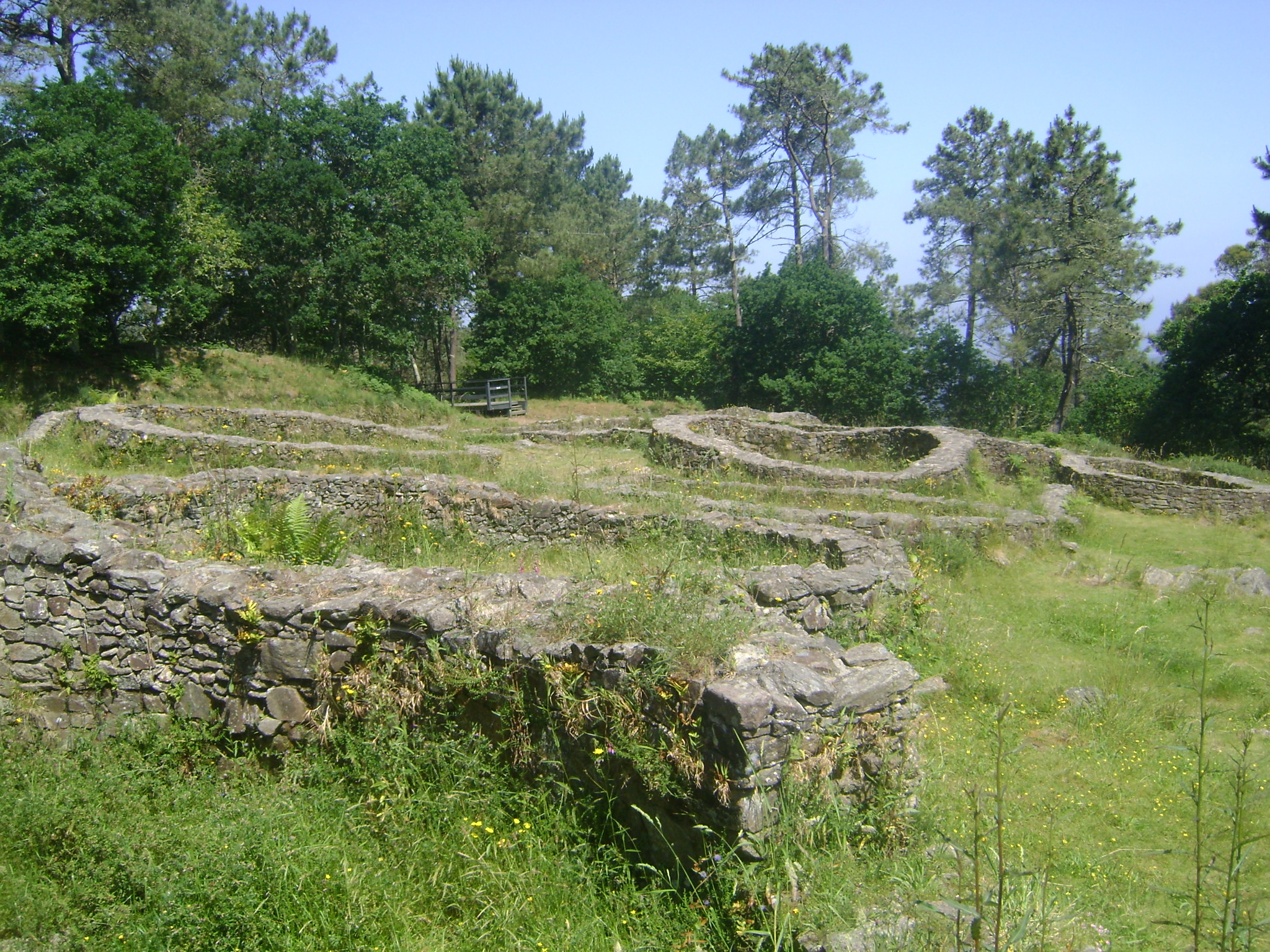
Hillfort in Galicia

In Galicia, Asturias, Cantabria, Basque Country, province of Ávila and Northern Portugal a castro is a fortified pre-Roman Iron Age village, usually located on a hill or some naturally easy defendable place. The larger hillforts are also called citanias, cividades or cidás (English: cities). They were located on hilltops, which allowed tactical control over the surrounding countryside and provided natural defences. They usually had access to a spring or small creek to provide water; some even had large reservoirs to use during sieges. Typically, a castro had one to five stone and earth walls, which complemented the natural defences of the hill. The buildings inside, most of them circular in shape, some rectangular, were about 3.5–15 m (11–49 ft) long; they were made out of stone with thatch roofs resting on a wood column in the centre of the building. In the major oppida there were regular streets, suggesting some form of central organization. Castros vary in area from less than a hectare to some 50 hectare ones, and most were abandoned after the Roman conquest of the territory.

Many castros were already established during the Atlantic Bronze Age period, pre-dating the Hallstatt culture.

Many of the megaliths, such as Bronze Age menhirs and Neolithic dolmens, which are frequently located near the castros, also pre-date the Celts in Portugal, Asturias and Galicia as well as in Atlantic France, Britain and Ireland. These megaliths were probably reused in syncretic rituals by the Celtic Druids.

The Celtiberian people occupied an inland region in central northern Spain, straddling the upper valleys of the Ebro, Douro and Tajo. They built hillforts, fortified hilltop towns and oppida, including Numantia.

=== Migration Period Germany ===
During the Migration Period (300-600 CE), a large number of hilltop settlements were established both on Roman imperial territory and the lands of the Germanic peoples. However, the term embraces many very different settlements in high locations. Fortifications protected at least a few Germanic settlements. Unlike the Romans, however, the Germanii did not use mortar for their construction at that time. Among the best-known hill settlements in Germany are the Runder Berg near Bad Urach and the Gelbe Burg near Dittenheim.

=== Sweden ===
In Sweden, hillforts are fortifications from the Iron Age which may have had several functions. They are usually located on the crests of hills and mountains making use of precipices and marshes which worked as natural defences. The crests' more accessible parts were defended with walls of stone and outer walls in the slopes beneath are common. Round and closed, so-called ring forts are common even on flat ground. The walls often have remaining parts of stone, which were probably the support of pales. They often have well delineated gateways, the gates of which were probably of wood. Hillforts with strong walls are often located beside old trade routes and have an offensive character, whereas others are reclusive and were weakly fortified, probably only for hiding during raids.

Many forts, located centrally in densely populated areas, were permanently settled strongholds and can show traces of settlements both inside and outside. Older place names containing the element sten/stein were usually hillforts.

In Sweden, there are 1,100 known hillforts with a strong concentration on the northern west coast and in eastern Svealand. In Södermanland there are 300, in Uppland 150, Östergötland 130, and 90 to 100 in each of Bohuslän and Gotland.

=== Norway ===
Norway has about 400 hillforts.

=== Denmark ===
Denmark has 26 hillforts.

=== Finland ===
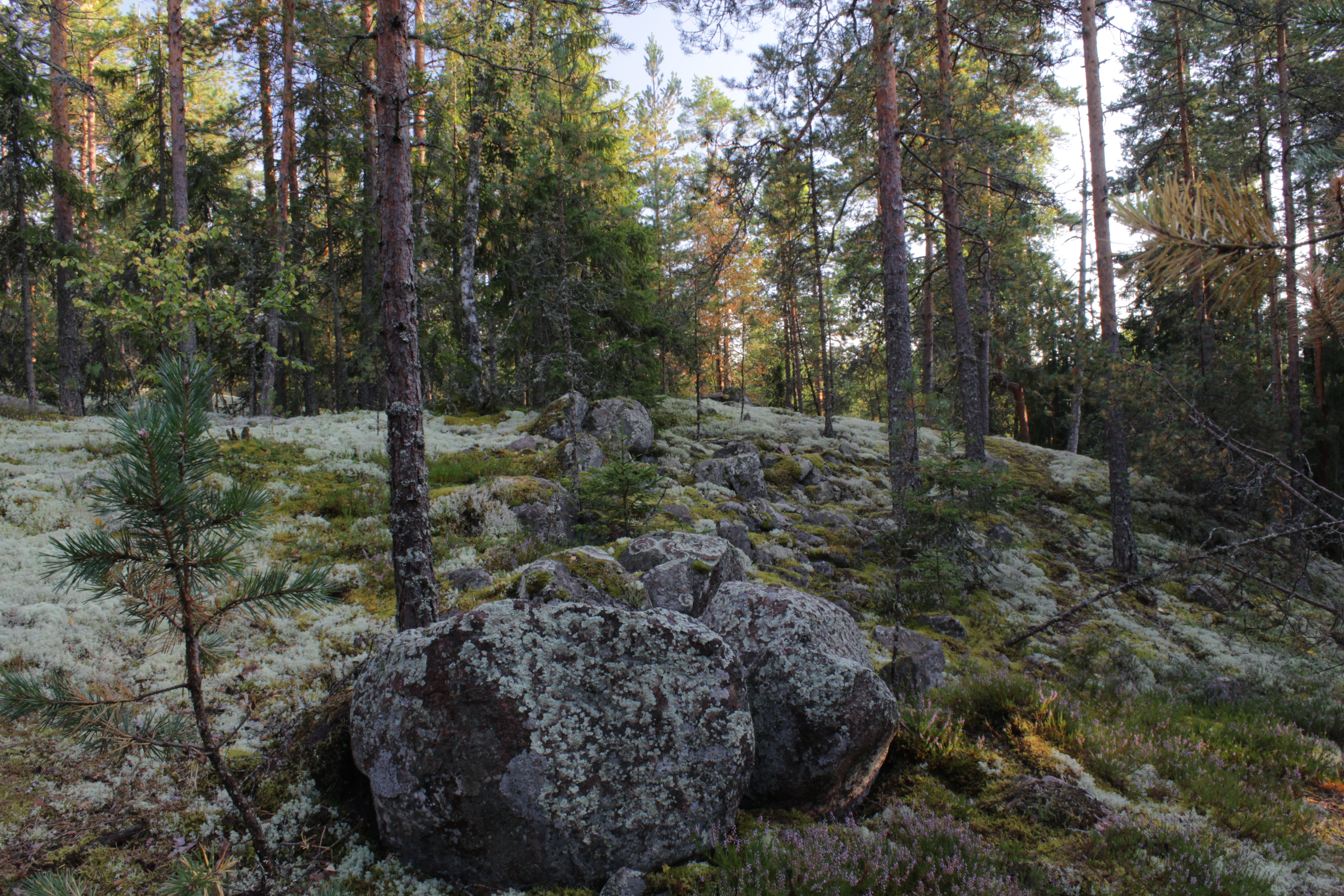
A ruins of the Unikonlinna hillfort in Janakkala, Finland

The Finnish word for hillfort is linnavuori (plural linnavuoret), meaning fort hill or castle hill, or alternatively muinaislinna meaning ancient fort, as opposed to bare linna which refers to medieval or later fortifications.

One special feature about the Finnish hillforts that while most of them are located these days within some distance from the sea, but earlier many of the forts were located by the sea, due to post-glacial rebound.

Finland has around 100 hillforts verified by excavations, and about 200 more suspected sites. The largest hillfort in Finland is the Rapola Castle, other notable are the Old Castle of Lieto and the Sulkava hillfort.

=== Estonia ===
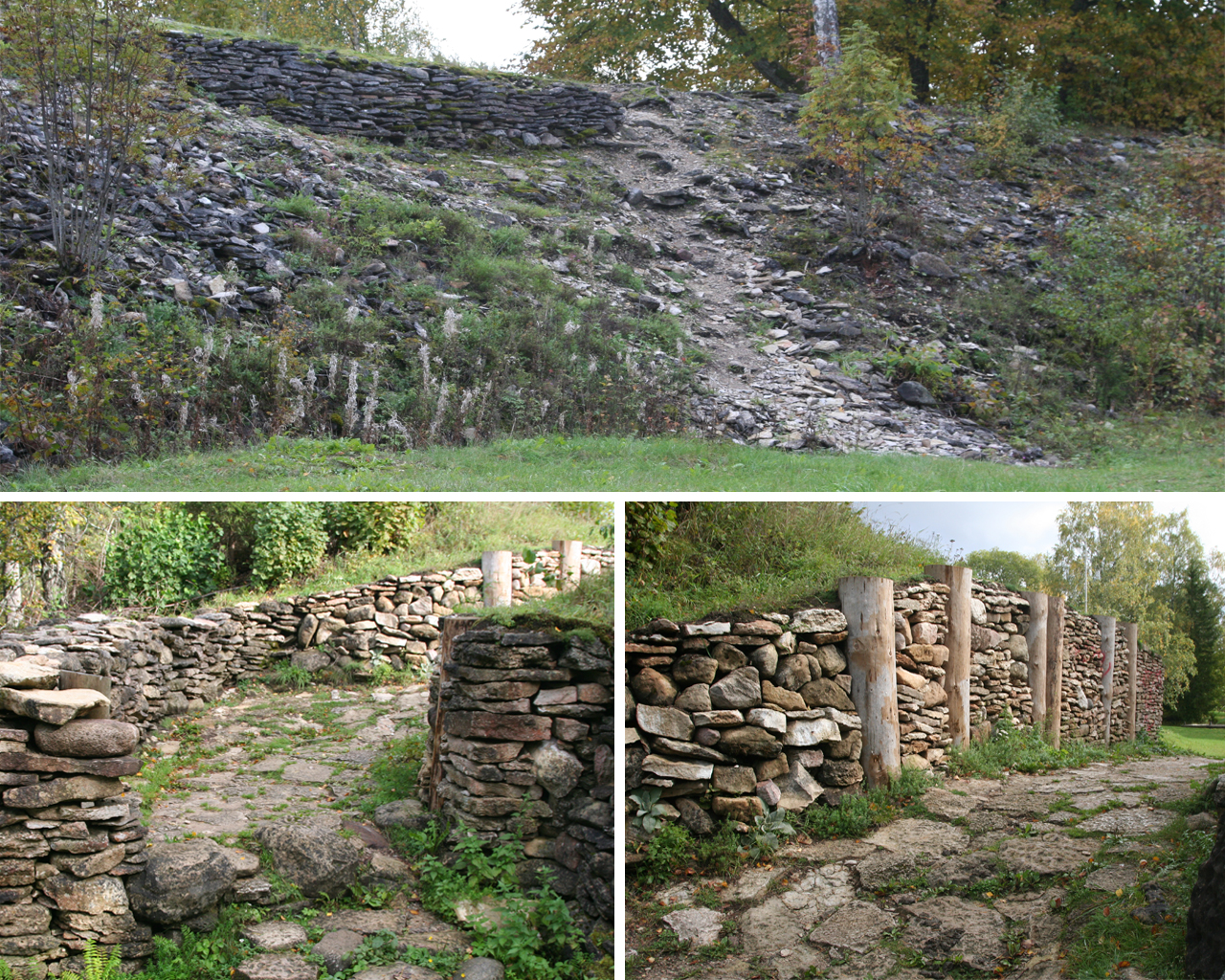
Varbola hillfort ruins in Estonia

The Estonian word for hillfort is linnamägi (plural linnamäed), meaning hillfort or hillburgh. There are several hundred hillforts or presumed ancient hillfort sites all over Estonia. Some of them, like Toompea in Tallinn or Toomemägi in Tartu, are governance centres used since ancient times up until today. Some others, like Varbola are historical sites nowadays.

Most likely the Estonian hillforts were in pre-Christian times administrative, economic and military centres of Estonian tribes. Although some of them were probably used only during times of crisis and stood empty in peacetime (for example Soontagana in Koonga parish, Pärnu county).

List of Estonian fortresses contains a common list of castles, fortresses, forts, an hillforts.

=== Latvia ===
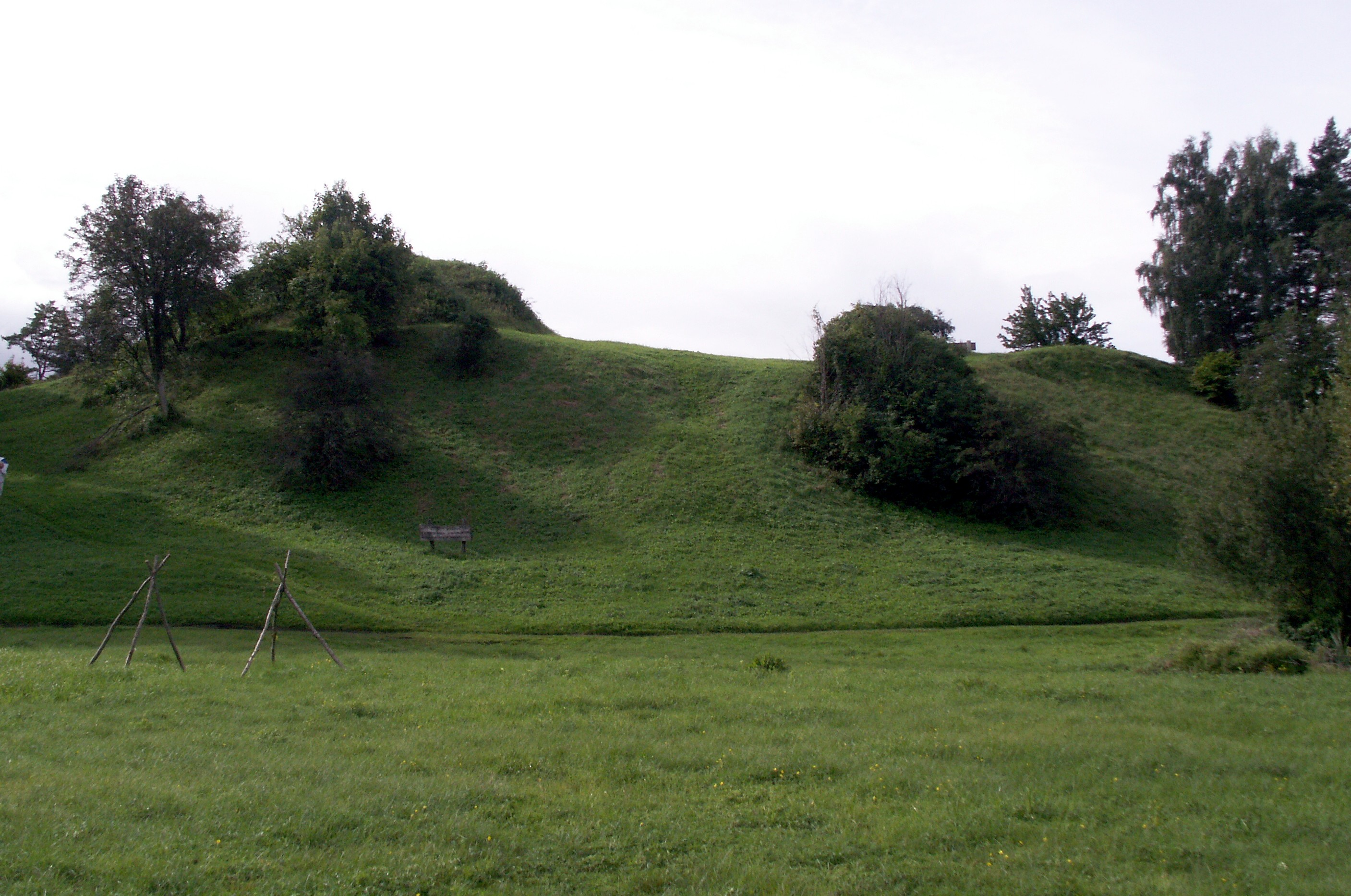
Tērvete hillfort. Main Semigallian centre in the late Iron Age

The Latvian word for hillfort is pilskalns (plural: pilskalni), from pils (castle) and kalns (hill).

Hillforts in Latvia offered not only military and administrative functions but they were also cultural and economic centres of some regions. Latvian hillforts generally were a part of a complex consisting of the main fortress, the settlement around it, one or more burial fields and nearby ritual sites. The first hillforts in Latvia, such as Daugmale hillfort, appeared during the Bronze Age. Some were continuously inhabited until the late Iron Age.

During the Roman Iron Age, some of the Latvian hillforts (like Ķivutkalns) were abandoned or became sparsely populated. A new period in hillfort development started during the 5th–8th centuries AD, when many new hillforts appeared, in most cases, along the main trades routes—rivers. During the 10th–11th centuries, some of the hillforts became military fortresses with strong fortifications (like hillforts in Tērvete, Talsi, Mežotne). Some of them are considered important political centres of the local peoples, who in this period were subjects of serious social political changes. That period was known for unrest and military activities, as well as power struggles between local aristocracy. Most of the Latvian hillforts were destroyed or abandoned during the Livonian Crusade in the 13th century, but some were still used in the 14th century. In total, there are about 470 hillforts in Latvia.

- Iron Age hillforts in Latvia

=== Lithuania ===
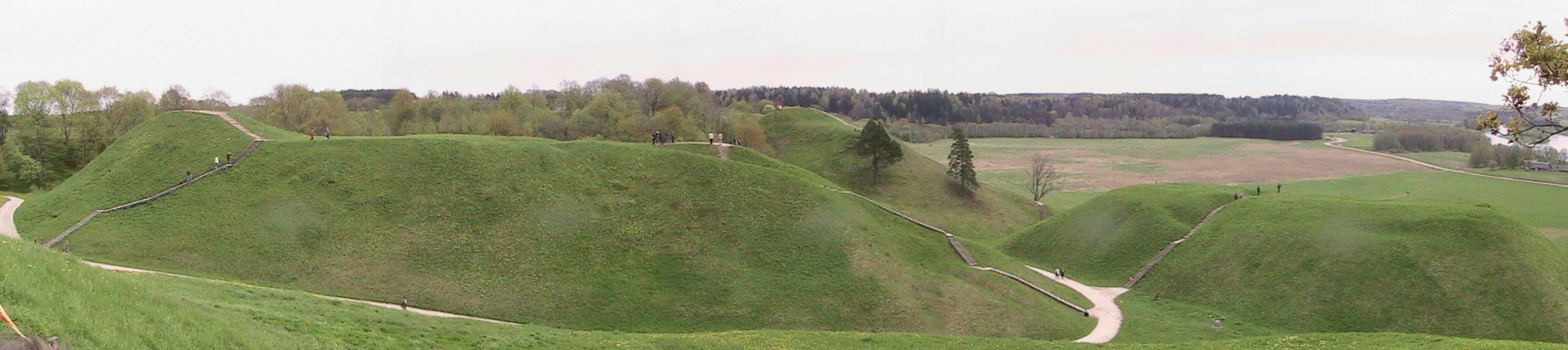
Kernavė Mounds complex, Kernavė, part of a World Heritage Site

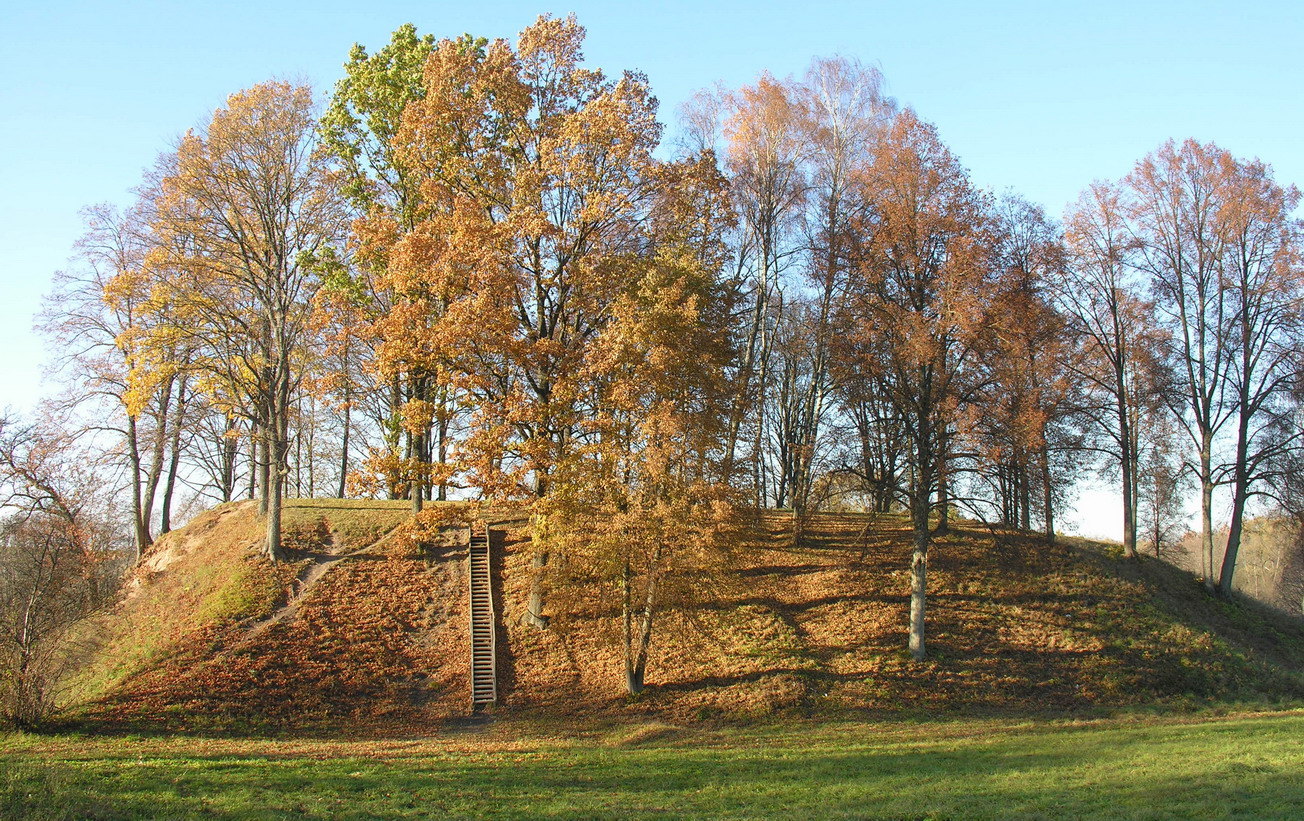
Daubariai Hillforts in Mažeikiai district municipality

The Lithuanian word for hillfort is piliakalnis (plural piliakalniai), from pilis (=castle) and kalnas (=mountain, hill).

Lithuania has hillforts dating from the Bronze Age in the 1st millennium BC. The earliest examples in present-day Lithuania are found in the east of the country. Most of these forts were built or expanded between the fifth and fifteenth centuries, when they were used in the Dukes' Wars, and against the invasion of Teutonic Knights from the west. Most forts were located on the banks of a river, or a confluence where two rivers met. These fortifications were typically wooden, although some had additional stone or brick walls. The hill was usually sculpted for defensive purposes, with the top flattened and the natural slopes made steeper for defence.

During the early years of Grand Duchy of Lithuania piliakalniai played a major role in conflicts with the Livonian Order and the Teutonic Knights. During this period the number of piliakalniai in use decreased, but those that remained had stronger fortifications. Two main defence lines developed: one along the Neman River (against the Teutonic Order) and another along the border with Livonia. Two other lines started to form, but did not fully develop. One was to protect Vilnius, the capital, and the other line in Samogitia, was a major target for both orders. This territory separated the two Orders and prevented joint action between them and Pagan Lithuania.

As of 2017, according to the Atlas of Lithuanian Hillforts, there were 921 objects in Lithuania identified as piliakalniai. Most piliakalniai are located near rivers and are endangered by erosion: many have partly collapsed as the flooded river has washed out the base of the hill. Now around 80 percent of piliakalniai are covered by forests and are hardly accessible to visitors.

- Map of hillforts in Lithuania

=== Gords in Eastern Europe ===
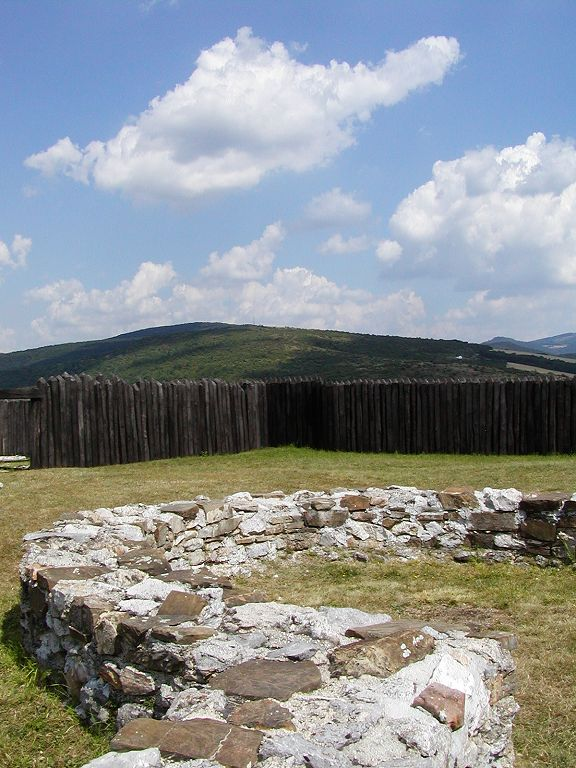
Hradisko Kostolec, Piešťany (Slovakia)

In Russia, Belarus, Poland and Ukraine, Iron Age and Early Medieval hillforts are called gords or hords. They were the residence of local rulers, and provided for refuge in times of war.

== Hillforts elsewhere in the world ==
Similar structures can be found elsewhere in the world, such as the Hill Forts of Rajasthan.

=== Philippines ===
In the Philippines, the Ivatan people of the Batanes Islands built ijang—fortified villages on top of natural hills and raised landforms near the coastlines. These were terraced into defensive ramparts with limited access points. Artifacts recovered from an ijang on the town of Savidug in Sabtang has been dated to around 1200 CE. These high rocky formations served as a refuge against attacking enemies. Ijang were first described by the English freebooter Captain William Dampier when he visited the island of Ivuhos in 1687. During the Spanish colonial era, ijang were abandoned during the Reducciones as the Ivatan population were moved into centralized towns in the lowlands.

=== New Zealand ===
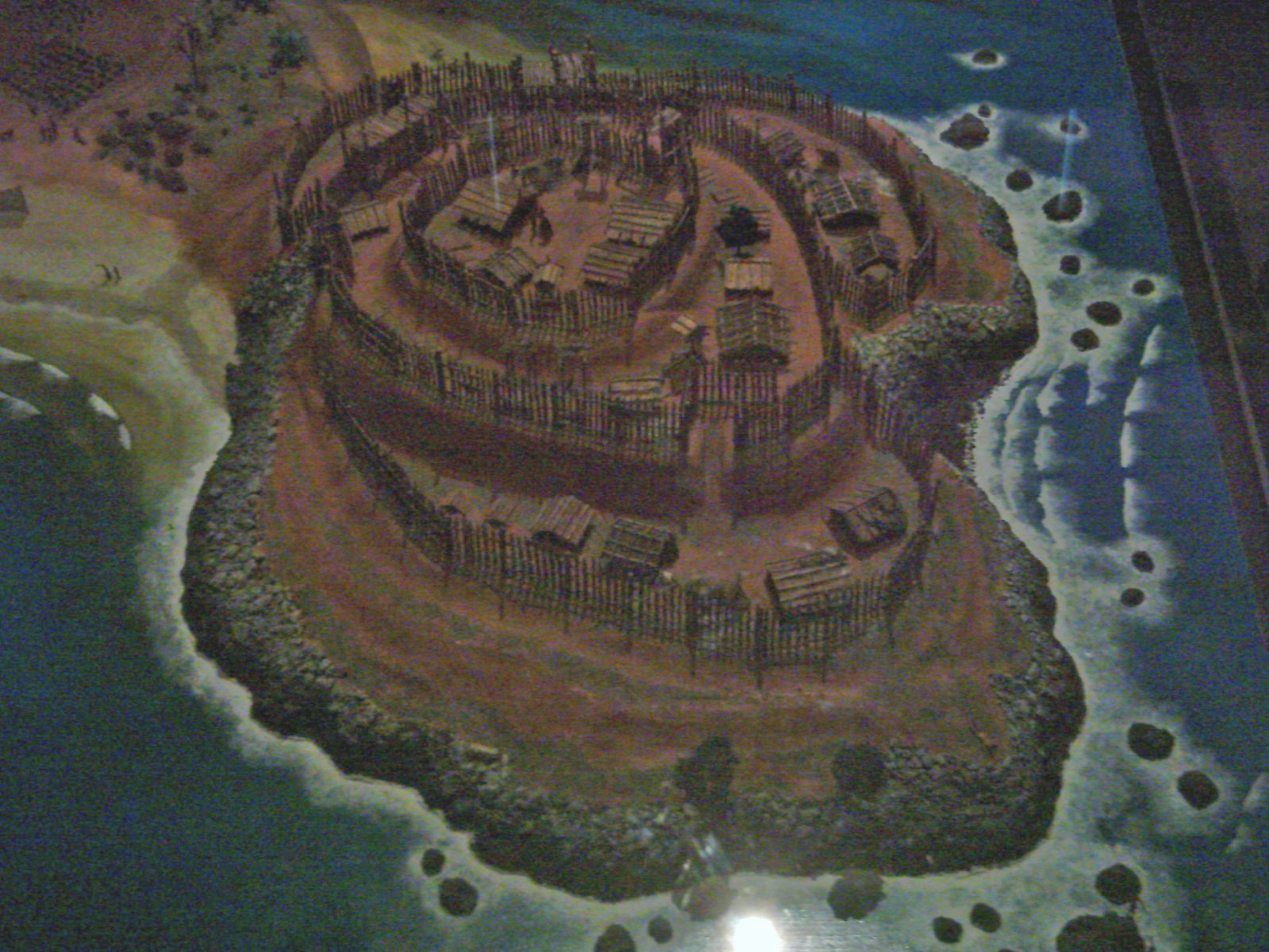
Model of a Māori pā on a headland, showing the stepped nature and the wood palisades

Among the Māori people, villages called pā were often built on raised ground, like volcanic hills, headlands, and small islands (including artificial islands). The slopes were terraced into defensive ramparts that were usually further protected by palisades. Traditional pā took a variety of designs, ranging from a simple terraced hill, to complex fortified structures that included multiple rows of palisades and underground defensive and ambush points. Māori pā differed from European hillforts in that they also prominently incorporated food storage pits and water sources. They survived mostly until the colonial era. Later types of pā were designed specifically for fighting with guns.

== See also ==
- Amba (geology), Ethiopian flat-topped mountain formations often used as defensive fortifications.
- Broch
- Chashi
- Nuraghe
- Oppidum
- Prehistoric warfare
- Promontory fort
- Acropolis
