= Daubariai hillforts =

Two hillforts in Lithuania

Daubariai Hillforts
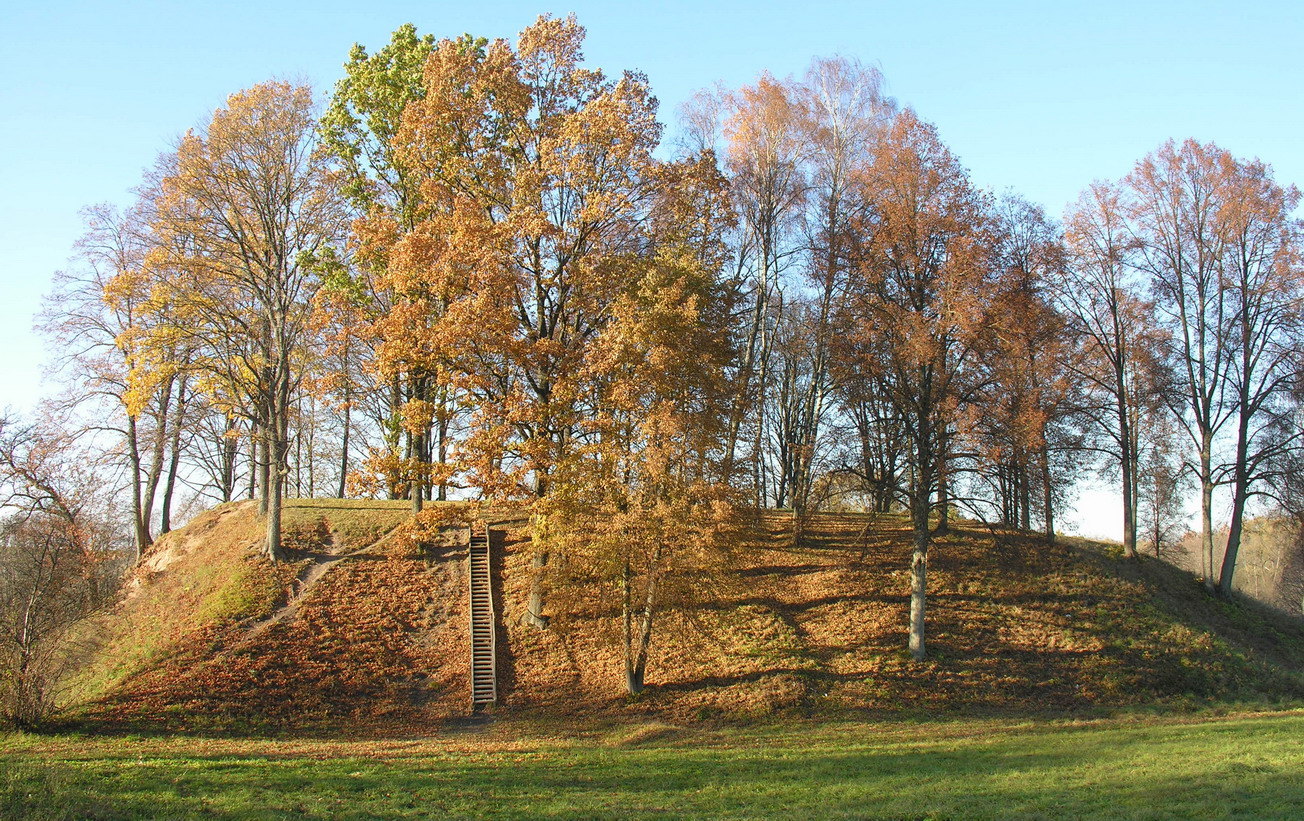
- Daubariai I mound

- Location within Lithuania
- Coordinates: 56°17′20.4″N 22°18′12.3″E
- Country: Lithuania
- Ethnographic region: Samogitia
- County: Telšiai County
- Municipality: Mažeikiai District Municipality
- Eldership: Tirkšliai eldership

The Daubariai hillforts are two hillforts (Daubariai I and Daubariai II respectively) located in the village of Daubariai, Lithuania, at the confluence of the Venta and Viešetė rivers. The largest mound, Daubariai I, was built on the right bank of the Viešetė, on a separate hill in the valley. The site of this part is oval, elongated in the north-south direction, 51 m (167 ft) by 26 m (85 ft) in size. The slopes are steep, 8 m (26 ft) high. The mound is surrounded by a swamp from the north, and a cultivated field from the east. The mound has been washed away from the western and southern sides, the southern slope is still eroding. A cultural layer 0.5 m (1.6 ft) to 1.0 m (3.3 ft) thick was found there, and the remains of a defensive wall were also discovered. 150 m (490 ft) south of this mound, Daubariai II can be found on the left bank of the Viešetė at the confluence with the Stulpas. It is truncated in the shape of a cone, with steep slopes 8 m (26 ft) high, with an 8 m (26 ft) by 3 m (9.8 ft) area dug with pits. This part of the mound is covered with soil, and several deciduous trees grow there.

== History ==
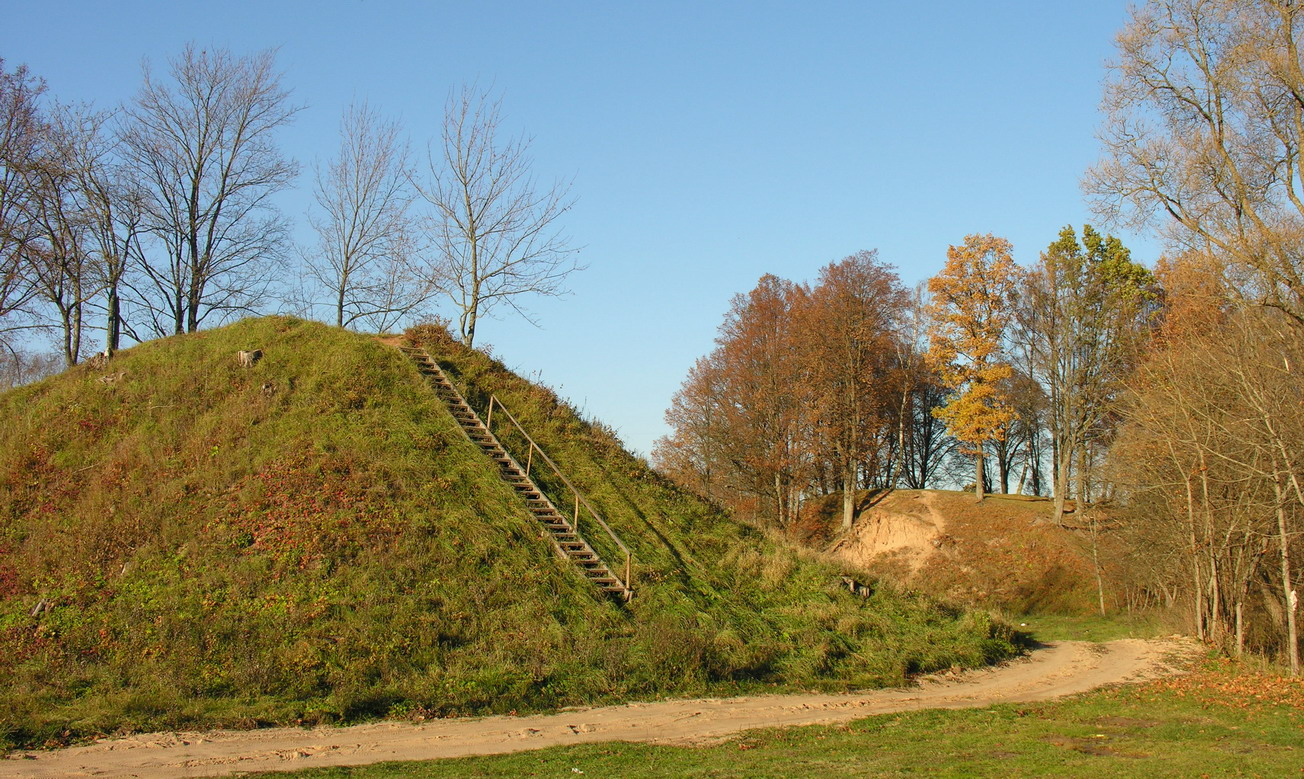
Daubariai II with Daubariai I in the background

It is believed that the settlement of Viešetė (Vesete) was located on the mounds, which is mentioned in a 1253 A.D. deed of division of lands between the Livonian Order and the Bishop of Courland.

In 1975, Lithuanian archaeologist Vytautas Daugudis explored an area of 274 m^{2} (2,950 sq ft) in Daubariai I, finding a cultural layer up to 1 m (3.3 ft) thick with traces of wooden fortifications, stone pavements, and smooth ceramics. On the outskirts of the site stood a 1.5 m (4.9 ft) to 2 m (6.6 ft) wide wooden defensive structure, the interior of which was paved with small stones, and the clay-filled walls made of horizontal logs were supported by buried pillars with a diameter of 15 cm (5.9 in) to 20 cm (7.9 in). In 1976, Daugudis explored an area of 4 m^{2} (43 sq ft) in Daubariai II and found a cultural layer up to 20 cm (7.9 in) thick. Archaeological research showed that the cultural layer here consists of layers from two different periods - the lower one belonged to the first half of the 1st millennium BC, and the upper one to the layer of the 5th-8th and 9th-13th centuries.

In 2009, conservation works were carried out on the Daubariai I and Daubariai II hillforts. The works, the total value of which was more than 526,000 Lt (Lithuanian litas) or approximately €152,340, was financed by the Department of Cultural Heritage under the Ministry of Culture and the Mažeikiai District Municipality. During the works, the slope of Daubariai I, which was being eroded by the Viešetė, was reinforced, the greenery was thinned, and a grassy surface was formed. Pedestrian paths, stairs to the mounds, a bridge over the stream, information stands and signs, resting and observation areas, and a parking lot were also installed.

== Archaeology ==
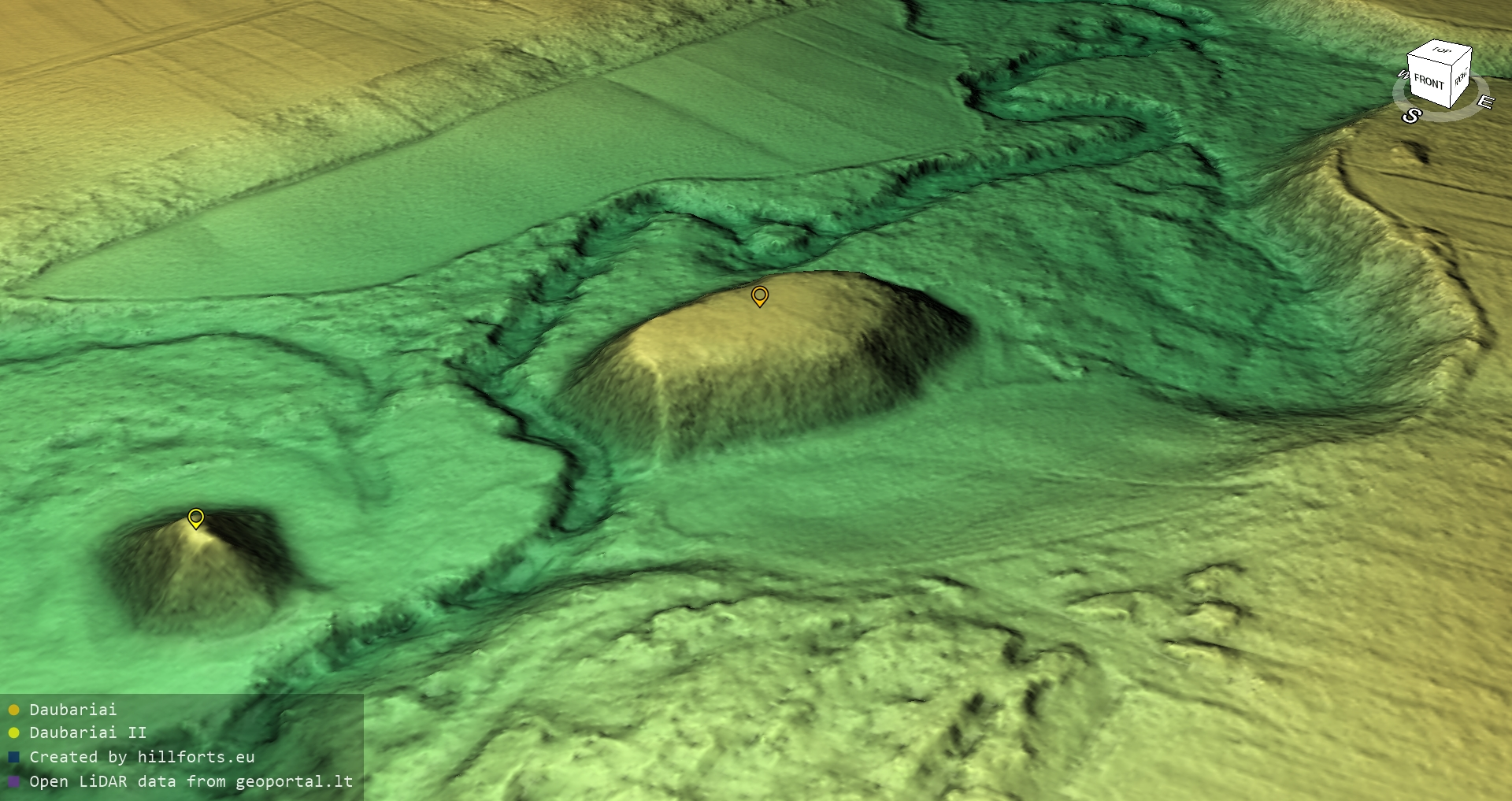
A topographic relief of the site, Daubariai II is on the left and Daubariai I is on the right

Items found in a 0.2-1.5 m thick cultural layer from the 1st millennium - 13th century during excavations in 1975 and 1976 include iron arrowheads, awls, knives, a rod-shaped pin, part of a sickle, a brass bracelet, a horseshoe brooch, rings, remains of various brass items, stone spindle whorls, a whetstone, clay weights, smooth, rough and polished ceramics, and four birch-bark bags with bronze scrap which were found in a house attributed to a jeweller. Larger items found included a stone-built furnace, pillar pits, fireplaces, and the remains of an iron smelting furnace. A section of a defensive ditch 70 m (230 ft) long, 4 m (13 ft) wide at the top, 2 m (6.6 ft) wide at the bottom, and up to 1.5 m (4.9 ft) deep was excavated on the eastern edge of the site. The ditch was dug to protect the settlement in the middle of the 1st millennium.

== Bibliography ==
- Dakanis, Bronius (1990). Mažeikių rajono archeologinių paminklų žvalgymas // Archeologiniai tyrinėjimai Lietuvoje [Exploration of archaeological monuments in the Mažeikiai district // Archaeological research in Lithuania in 1988 and 1989] (in Lithuanian). Vilnius. p. 188–189.
- Daugudis, Vytautas (1977). Daubarių (Mažeikių raj.) piliakalnio ir gyvenvietės tyrinėjimai 1975 metais // Archeologiniai tyrinėjimai Lietuvoje 1974 ir 1975 metais [Research on the Daubariai (Mažeikiai district) hillfort and settlement in 1975 // Archaeological research in Lithuania in 1974 and 1975] (in Lithuanian). Vilnius. p. 20-27.
- Daugudis, Vytautas (1978). Daubarių (Mažeikių raj.) archeologinių paminklų tyrinėjimai 1976 metais // Archeologiniai tyrinėjimai Lietuvoje 1976–1977 metais [Research of archaeological monuments in Daubariai (Mažeikiai district) in 1976 // Archaeological research in Lithuania in 1976–1977] (in Lithuanian). Vilnius. p. 101-108.
- Ličkūnas, Stasys (1934). Mažeikių apskrities piliakalniai // Gimtasai kraštas [Mounds of Mažeikiai County // Gimtasai kraštas] (in Lithuanian). Šiauliai. No. 1, p. 49-51.
