= Lambert's Castle =

Historic hill fort in Dorset, England

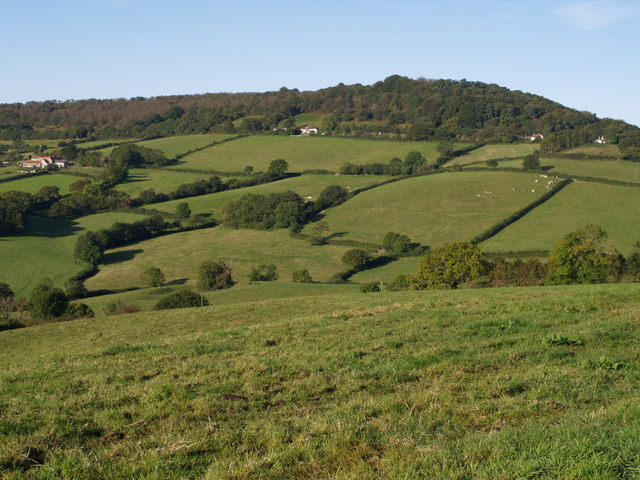
- Lambert's Castle, seen from the east

- Location of the site in Dorset
- 50.78713°N 2.89509°W
- Periods: Iron Age
- Location: Dorset, England

Site notes
- Owner: National Trust
- Public access: Yes, Open Access Land

Scheduled monument
- Official name: Lambert's Castle: an Iron Age hillfort 425m west of Nash Farm, with a bowl barrow, and the sites of a post-medieval fair and a telegraph station
- Designated: 26 August 1924
- Reference no.: 1017035

Lambert's Castle is an Iron Age hillfort in the county of Dorset in southwest England. Since 1981 it has been designated as a Site of Special Scientific Interest (SSSI) on account of its geology, archaeology and ecology. The hillfort is designated a scheduled monument together with a bowl barrow, the sites of a post-medieval fair and a telegraph station. The site was on the Heritage at Risk Register but was removed in 2022 as a result of the Hillforts and Habitats Project.

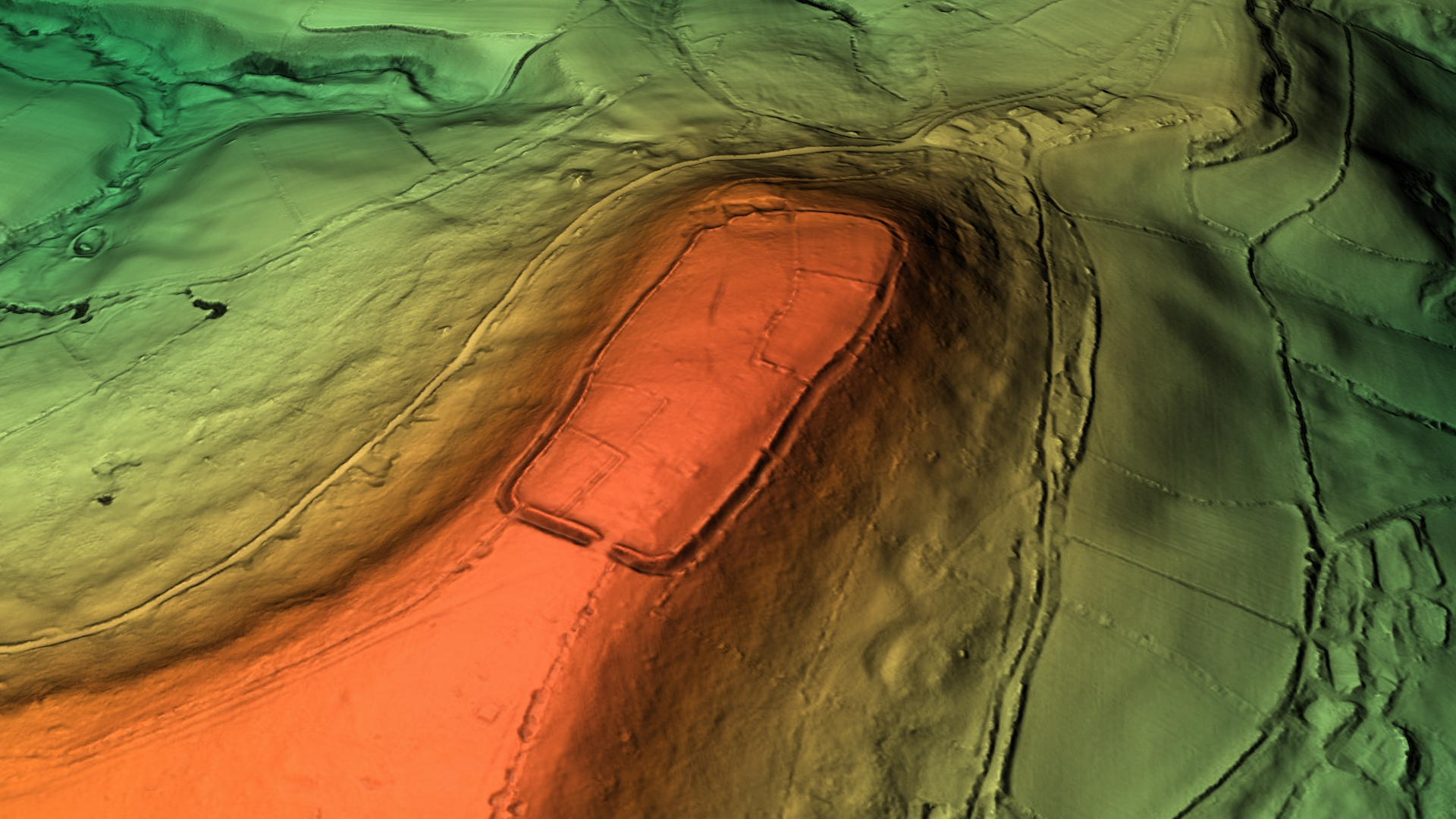
3D view of the digital terrain model

The hillfort is situated on a broad northerly spur at the summit of Lambert's Castle Hill, which rises to a height of 256 metres (840 ft). There are steep natural slopes on three sides of the fort, and linear ramparts across the flat southern approaches. The site is owned by the National Trust. A car park is accessible from the B3165 road. There are two other hill-forts near Lambert's Castle: Coney's Castle is about 1.5 kilometres (0.9 mi) to its south, and Pilsdon Pen is about 5 km (3.1 mi) to its north-east.

== History ==
Lamberts Castle was built around 2,500 years ago; a prominent ditch and bank still survive near the western entrance. A fair was held here from 1709 to 1947, during which the hilltop was used as a racecourse.

== Geology ==
The site consists of sands and marls of the middle Lias with the remains of Gault and Upper Greensand capping. There are strong outflows of springs at various junctions of the upper greensand and gault.

== Ecology ==
=== Plateau surface of Upper Greensand ===
This is a mosaic of acidic grassland, open heath, scrubland and secondary woodland and comprises: sheep-fescue (Festuca ovina), sweet vernal-grass (Anthoxanthum odoratum), early hair-grass (Aira praecox), heath-grass (Danthonia decumbens) and field wood-rush (Luzula campestris). Herbs present include abundant tormentil (Potentilla erecta), heath milkwort (Polygala serpyllifolia), cats-ear (Hypochaeris radicata), heath bedstraw (Galium saxatile), heather (Calluna vulgaris), bell heather (Erica cinerea), bristle bent (Agrostis curtisii), bilberry (Vaccinium myrtillus), bryophytes, lichen, gorse (Ulex europaeus), western gorse (Ulex gallii), bramble (Rubus fruticosus), bracken (Pteridium aquilinum), birch (Betula spp.), hawthorn (Crataegus monogyna), rowan (Sorbus aucuparia) and pedunculate oak (Quercus robur).

=== Upper Greensand / Gault junction ===
This is a zone of acidic bog vegetation consisting of: purple moor-grass (Molinia caerulea), common cottongrass (Eriophorum angustifolium), sedges (Carex spp.) including star sedge (Carex echinata), green-ribbed sedge (Carex binervis) and flea sedge (Carex pulicaris); bog moss (Sphagnum spp.), heath spotted-orchid (Dactylorhiza maculata), devils-bit scabious (Succisa pratensis), bog asphodel (Narthecium ossifragum), marsh violet (Viola palustris), meadow thistle (Cirsium dissectum), wood horsetail (Equisetum sylvaticum), lesser butterfly-orchid (Platanthera bifolia) and pale butterwort (Pinguicula lusitanica).

=== Lower slopes ===
Unimproved, herb-dominated neutral grassland consisting of: crested dogstail (Cynosurus cristatus), common knapweed (Centaurea nigra), red fescue (Festuca rubra), yellow oat-grass (Trisetum flavescens), quaking grass (Briza media), spring-sedge (Carex caryophyllea), glaucous sedge (Carex flacca), red clover (Trifolium pratense), ox-eye daisy (Leucanthemum vulgare), common bird-foot-trefoil (Lotus corniculatus). Less frequent species are lady's-mantle (Alchemilla vulgaris), dyer's greenweed (Genista tinctoria), corky-fruited water-dropwort (Oenanthe pimpinelloides) and adders-tongue (Ophioglossum vulgatum).

=== Wet areas in grassland ===
Soft rush (Juncus effusus), sharp-flowered rush (Juncus acutiflorus), oval sedge (Carex leporina), common yellow-sedge (Carex demissa), carnation sedge (Carex panicea), common marsh-bedstraw (Galium palustre), marsh pennywort (Hydrocotyle vulgaris), ragged-robin (Lychnis flos-cuculi), greater birds-foot-trefoil (Lotus uliginosus), bog pimpernel (Lysimachia tenella) and bristle clubrush (Isolepis setacea).

== Notable invertebrates ==
- Glow-worm (Lampyris noctiluca)
- Pearl-bordered fritillary (Boloria selene)
- Small pearl-bordered fritillary (Bolaria euphrosyne)
