= Coney's Castle =

Iron Age hillfort in Dorset, England

Coordinates: 50.77367°N 2.89200°W

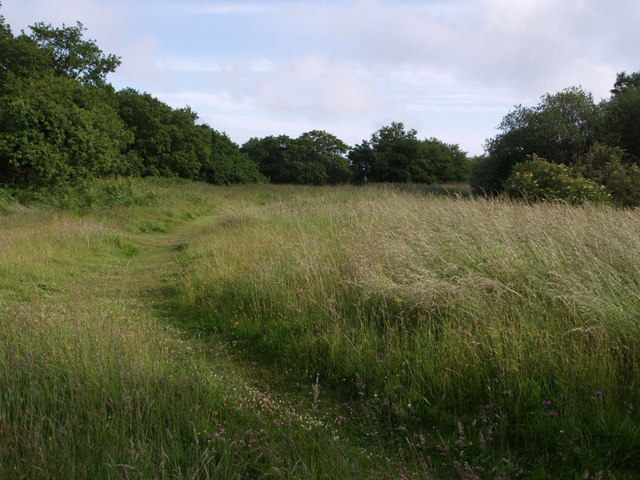
Coney's Castle

Coney's Castle shown within Dorset
(grid reference SY372975)

Coney's Castle is an Iron Age hillfort in Dorset, England. The name Coney is from the Old English for rabbit (Latin cuniculus), suggesting medieval use as a domestic warren, as at nearby Pilsdon Pen.

The fort is on a narrow north–south ridge reaching a height of 210 m, with linear ramparts across the ridge, steep natural slopes to the west and a high artificial rampart with ditch to the east.

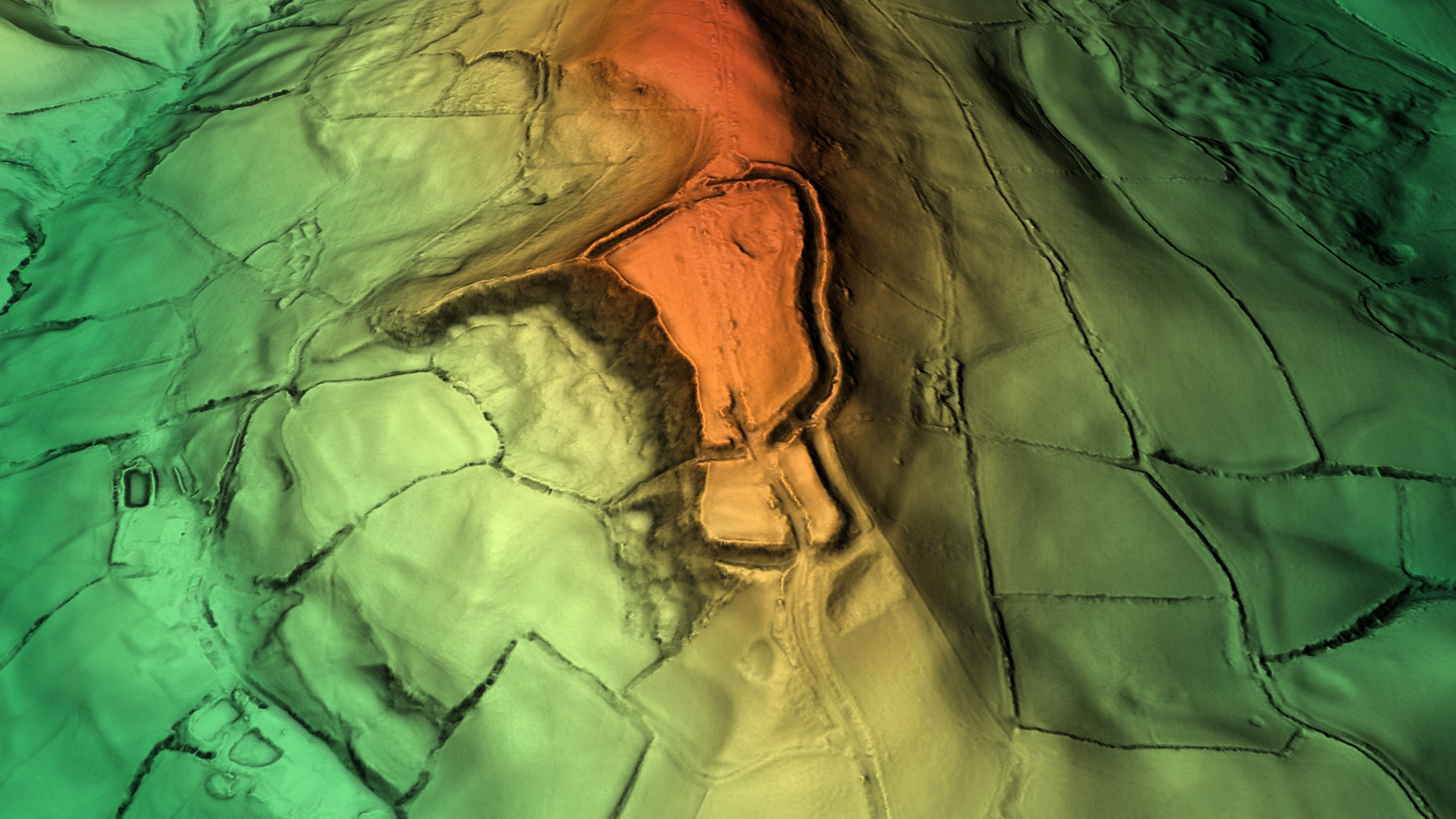
3D view of the digital terrain model

A small lane runs along the ridge, bisecting the hillfort. The lane is also part of the Wessex Ridgeway long-distance trail. There is a convenient car park next to the north rampart.

The remains of the hillfort are designated as a scheduled monument and was on the Heritage at Risk Register but was removed in 2022 as a result of the Hillforts and Habitats Project. The site is looked after by the National Trust as is Lambert's Castle about 1.5 km to the north.

== See also ==
- Lambert's Castle
- Pilsdon Pen
