= Runder Berg =

Mountain in Baden-Württemberg, Germany

Coordinates: 48°29′23″N 09°21′54″E

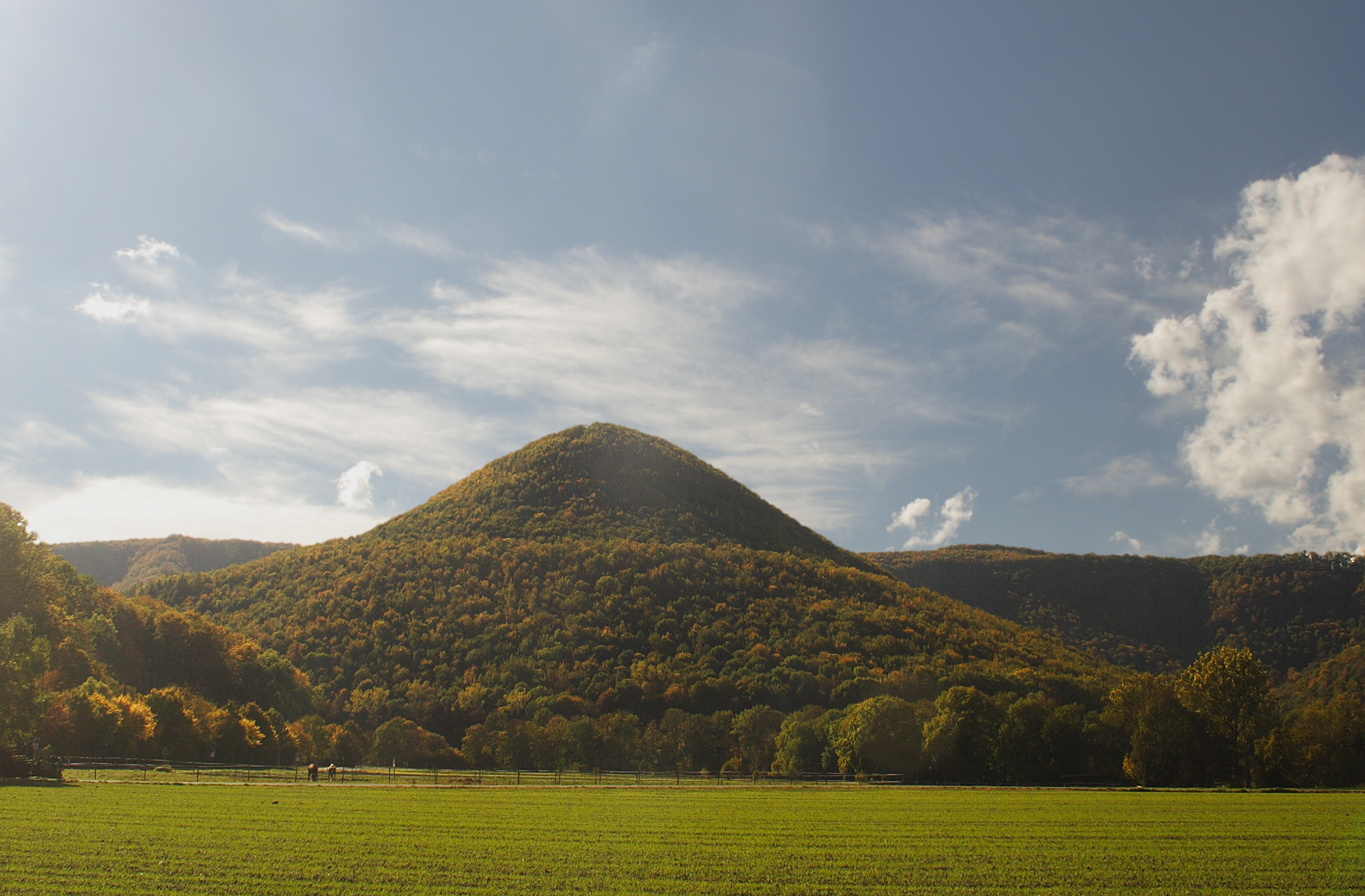

Highest point
- Elevation: 711 m (2,333 ft)

Geography
- Location: Baden-Württemberg, Germany

Runder Berg is a mountain in Baden-Württemberg, Germany. It is an oval hill (711 m above sea level) in the Swabian Alb and 250 meters above the valley. On a plateau about 0.45 hectares in size prehistoric and hilltop settlements have been found including the castle of a minor Alemanni king of the 4th and 5th centuries. Excavations were carried out on the entire mountain and on a terrace on a slope in 1967–1984.
