= Tirkšliai Eldership =

Eldership of Lithuania

The Tirkšliai Eldership (Lithuanian: Tirkšlių seniūnija) is an eldership of Lithuania, located in the Mažeikiai District Municipality. In 2021 its population was 3520.
