= Lithuanian Civil War =

Lithuanian Civil War may refer to:

- Lithuanian Civil War (1381–1384), a war between Jogaila and his uncle Kęstutis with son Vytautas
- Lithuanian Civil War (1389–1392), a war between Jogaila and his cousin Vytautas
- Lithuanian Civil War (1432–1438), a war between Švitrigaila and Sigismund Kęstutaitis
- Lithuanian Civil War (1697–1702), a war between several powerful magnate families

== See also ==
- Glinski rebellion of 1508
- History of Lithuania (1219–95)
