= Mary Channing =

British murderer (1687–1706)

Mary Channing (née Brooks; May 1687 – 21 March 1706) was an English woman from the county of Dorset. Channing is known for being convicted of poisoning her husband and being burnt at the stake.

== Biography ==
Mary Brooks was born in early May 1687 to Richard and Elizabeth Brooks of Dorchester. The lack of proper parental control is said to have lowered her character. She soon established a friendship with a young neighbour to whom she often presented lavish gifts and together they spent their evenings outside. After receiving frequent complaints from neighbours, Brook's parents decided that she should be married; they thought a husband would have more control over her than they commanded. So she married, albeit reluctantly, a grocer named Thomas Channing on 15 January 1704. Even after being married, she continued meeting her lover. Channing is said to have poisoned her husband's milk.

Before dying on 21 April, Thomas Channing wrote his will, leaving everything to his father except a shilling for Mary. Her father-in-law grew suspicious and upon post-mortem of Channing's body, he was found to have been poisoned. Mary fled Dorchester and was on the run until she found a distant relative she could stay with.

When apprehended, Channing denied having killed her husband and asked the examining committee headed by Dorchester mayor to let her touch her deceased husband's body. If it did not bleed, she should be deemed innocent. Her trial began on 28 July 1705 at Dorchester Assizes and she conducted her own defence. Channing was declared guilty but the sentence was suspended when she was found to be pregnant. In prison she gave birth to a son on 19 December.

Channing was burnt at Maumbury Rings on 21 March 1706. Her execution was witnessed by about 10,000 people.

== Legacy ==
Thomas Hardy was somewhat "fascinated" by and "obsessed" of Channing's execution. Critic David Musselwhite points out that Nance Mockridge, Mother Cuxsom and Mrs. Goodenogh, three characters in Hardy's The Mayor of Casterbridge, were an "avatar or surrogate of Channing. The Ring at Casterbridge mentioned in the novel was actually in Maumbury. In his article published in The Times (1908), Hardy noted the lack of evidences in proving that Channing poisoned her husband. Two of Hardy's poems The Mock Wife and The Bridge-Night Fire make references to her. David James' play White Mercury, Brown Rice (1995) enacted the trial of Channing.

The main character in John Cowper Powys' novel Maiden Castle (1937) writes a book about Mary Channing.

== Bibliography ==
- Durston, Gregory J. (2014). Wicked Ladies: Provincial Women, Crime and the Eighteenth-Century English Justice System. Cambridge Scholars Publishing. ISBN 978-1-4438-6599-9.
- Hardy, Thomas (1997). Norman Page (ed.). The Mayor of Casterbridge. Broadview Press. ISBN 978-1-55111-122-3.
- Musselwhite, David (2003). Social Transformations in Hardy's Tragic Novels: Megamachines and Phantasms. Palgrave Macmillan UK. ISBN 978-0-230-50452-3.
- Serious Admonitions to Youth, In a short Account of the Life, Trial, Condemnation and Execution of Mrs. Mary Channing. London: Benjamin Bragg. 1706. OCLC 316657264.
