= Maumbury Rings =

Neolithic earthwork in Dorset, England

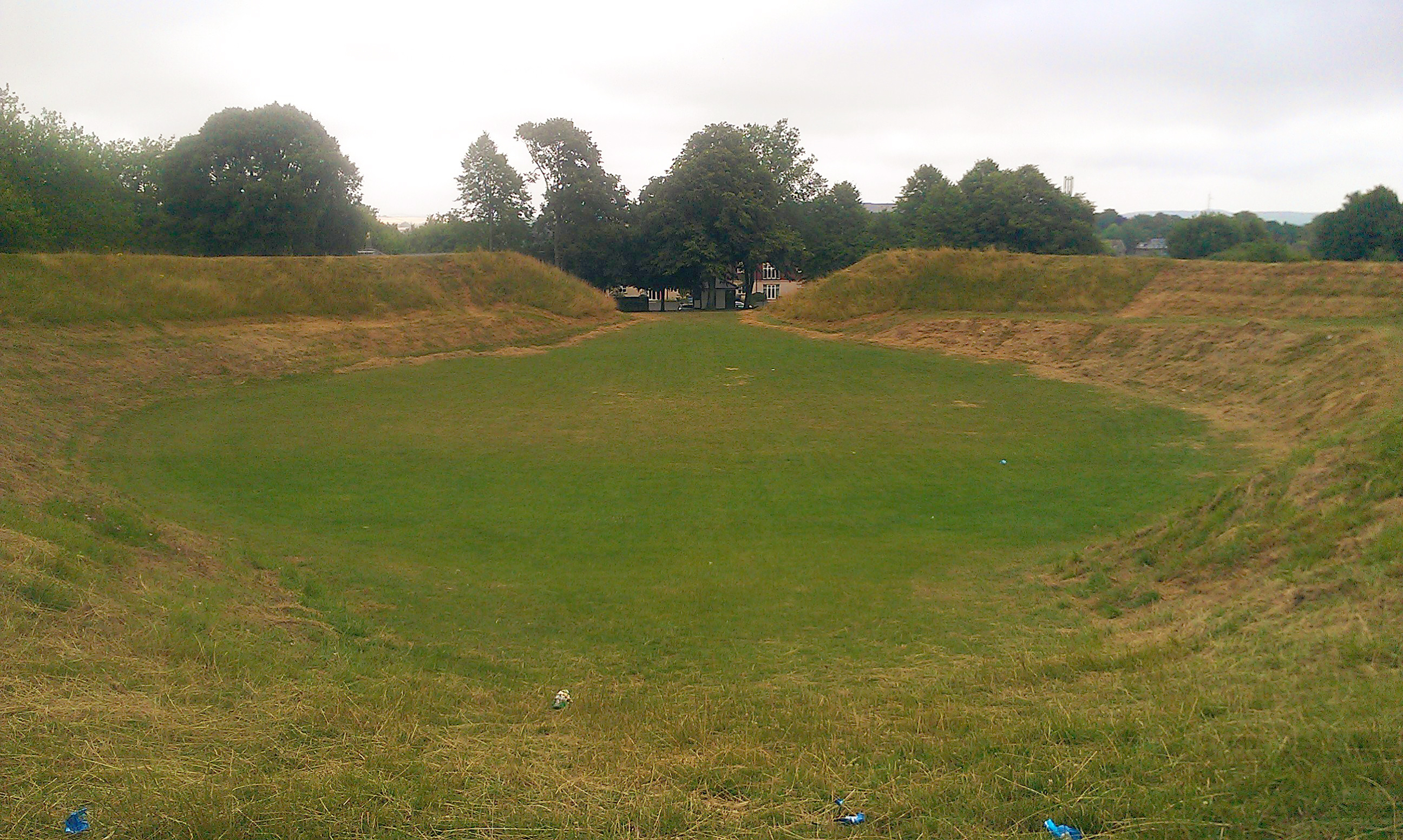
- Interior of Maumbury Rings viewed from southern end

- Location within Dorset
- 50°42′28″N 2°26′25″W
- Type: Henge
- Periods: Neolithic, with later Roman and Civil War modifications
- Location: Dorchester, Dorset

Site notes
- Public access: Yes

Scheduled monument
- Official name: Henge, Romano-British amphitheatre and Civil War fieldworks known collectively as Maumbury Rings
- Designated: 1 October 1962
- Reference no.: 1003204

Maumbury Rings is a Neolithic henge in the south of Dorchester town in Dorset, England (grid reference SY690899). It is a large circular earthwork, 85 metres in diameter, with a single bank and an entrance to the north east. It was modified during the Roman period when it was adapted for use as an amphitheatre, and the site was remodelled again during the English Civil War when it was used as an artillery fort guarding the southern approach to Dorchester. The monument is now a public open space, and used for open-air concerts, festivals and re-enactments.

== Description ==
Maumbury Rings is a roughly circular henge situated close to the centre of Dorchester. It has an internal diameter of around 50 metres. The bank has an average width of 4 metres, and is around 5.6 metres high internally and 4.0 metres high externally. A bulge in the earthworks to the southwest marks the site of a gun emplacement built during the English Civil War, and the inner side of the bank was terraced on the east and west sides at this time. There is no trace of the original internal ditch.

== History ==
=== Neolithic ===
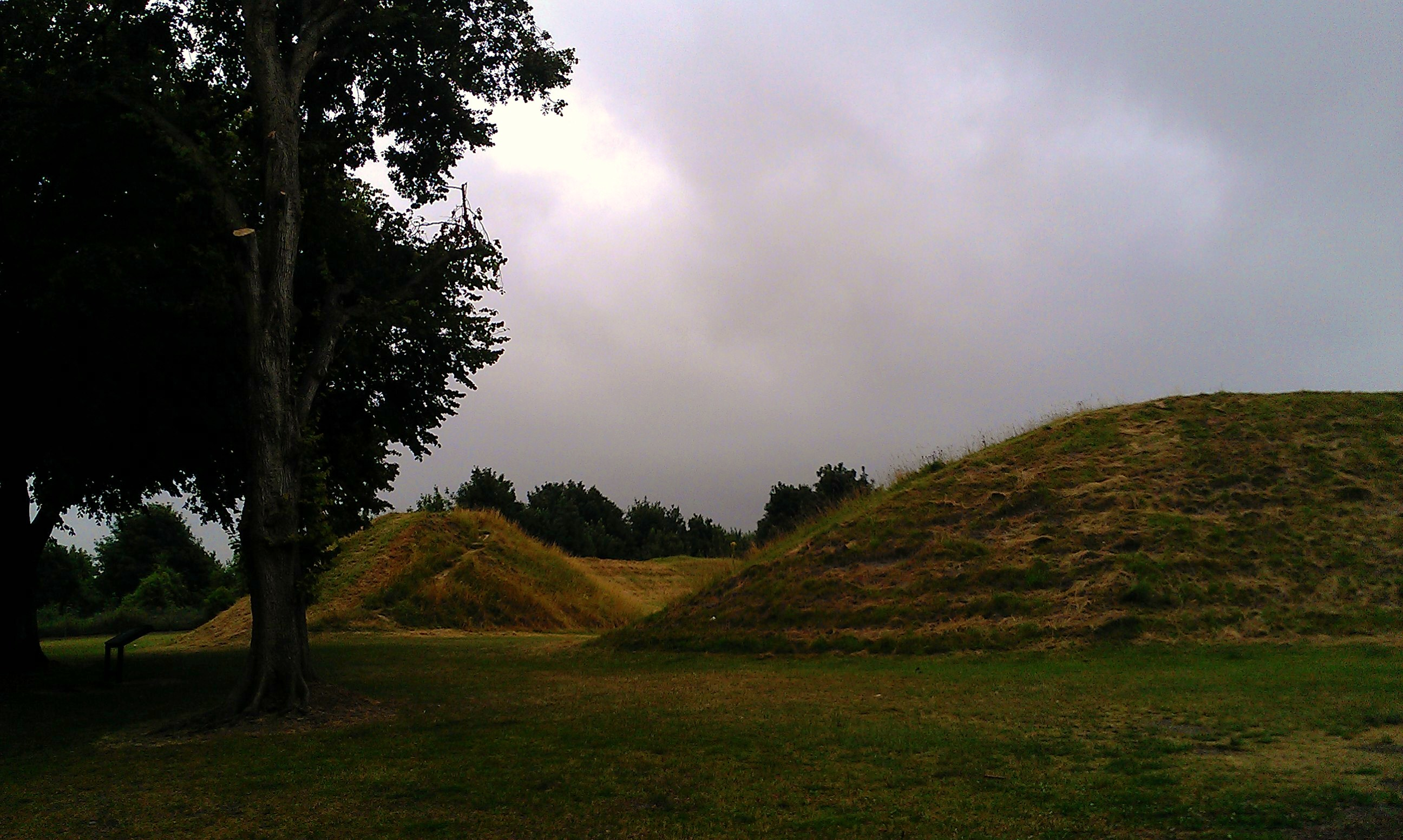
The northern entrance to the Rings.

Maumbury Rings were excavated by Harold St George Gray from 1908–1913. The excavations showed that the site originated in the later Neolithic period. The excavations revealed an internal ditch which comprised a series of deep shafts cut into the chalk. These number up to 45, and were up to 11 metres deep. Eight shafts were fully excavated. They contained various deposits including antler, animal and human bone, flints and carved chalk.The latter represent human phalloi and may be evidence of a fertility cult among the builders. A single Grooved ware pottery sherd was recovered from one pit, and a later Beaker sherd was recovered from the fill of another pit. The henge had a single entrance on the northeast side. It is recorded that a large stone was discovered during cultivation in 1849 to the west of the entrance, but it was reburied and has not been seen since.

Around 2 km due east are the faint traces of a larger henge known as Mount Pleasant henge, and archaeology has revealed the presence of another Neolithic enclosure known as Flagstones near there. In addition, when archaeologists were digging on the site of the Tudor Arcade/Waitrose development in the 1980s (around 800 metres northeast of Maumbury Rings) they discovered large timber postholes. The evidence suggests that they were part of a large Neolithic enclosure with a diameter of around 300 to 400 metres. Red markings, denoting sites of some of the timber posts, can be seen in the car park of Waitrose.

=== Roman era ===
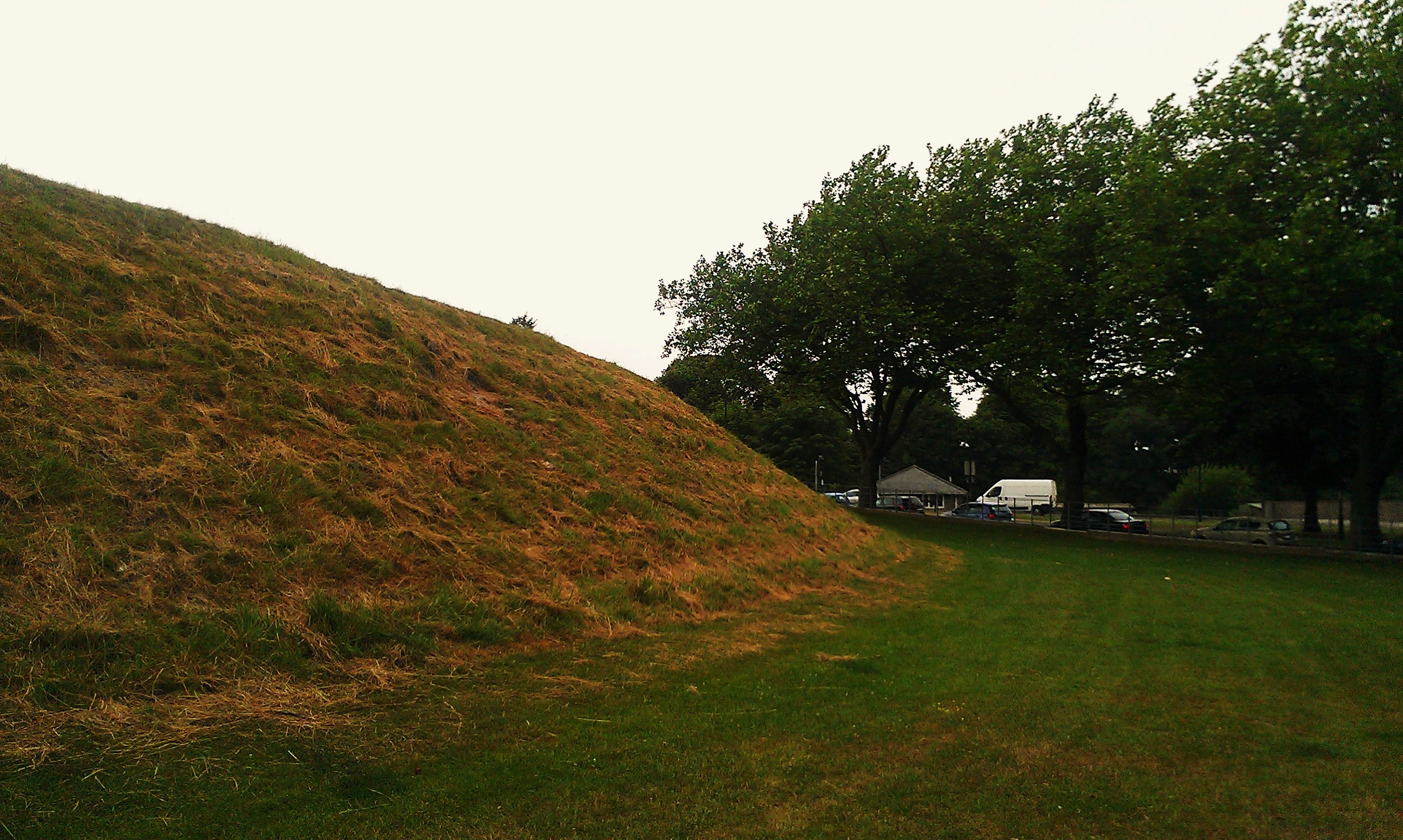
The western ramparts of the Ring.

Maumbury Rings was remodelled in the Roman period when it was adapted for use as an amphitheatre for the use of the citizens of the nearby Roman town of Durnovaria (Dorchester). The banks were lowered by around 3 metres, with the material produced piled onto the banks. The interior was modified by the excavation of an oval, level arena floor, and the cutting of seating into the scarp and bank which was revetted with either chalk or timber. Chambers were cut into the bank to the south-west and one on each side of the centre. Finds found during the excavations include an uninscribed British coin, Roman pottery, leg bones, coins, and a 2nd-century burial. The amphitheatre may have been out of use by the mid-2nd century, although objects found on the arena floor and elsewhere suggest activity in the 4th century.

=== Civil war ===
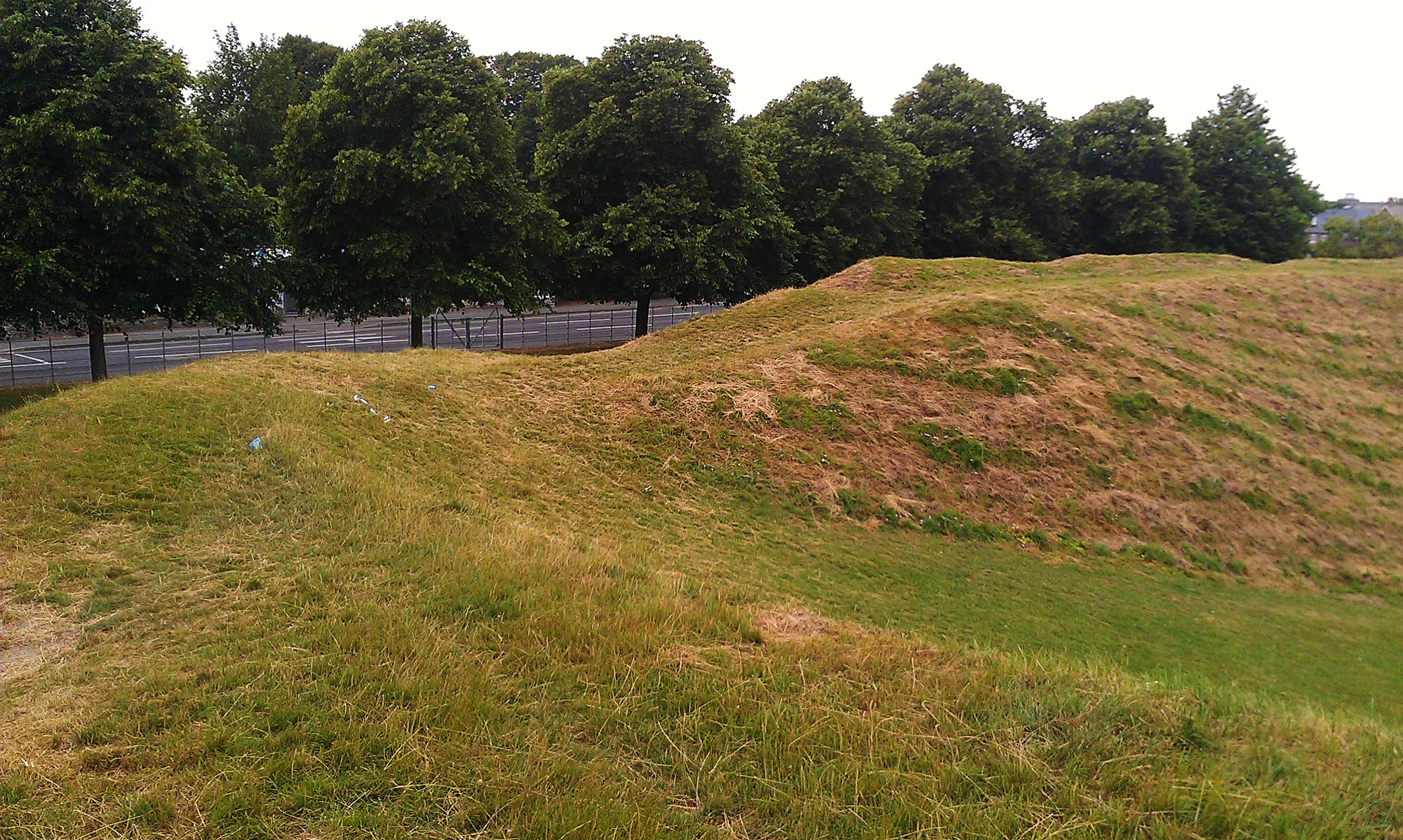
The secondary entrance, on the southern end.

Between 1642 and 1643 the henge was modified in response to the English Civil War. The site was used as an artillery fort by Parliament supporters in order to guard the southern approach to Dorchester. This involved the placing of a gun platform and a ramp on the southwest side, and the internal terrace was built. An unfinished well near the northwest edge of the arena and finds of 160 lead pistol bullets on the east bank all date to this time, along with a ditch beyond the northern enclosure bank.

=== Later use ===
Its amphitheatre role was briefly revived in the late 17th and early 18th centuries, as a place of public execution. In 1685, at the close of the Monmouth Rebellion, Judge Jeffreys ordered eighty of the rebels to be executed here. In 1705 Mary Channing, a nineteen-year-old woman found guilty of poisoning her husband, was executed by strangulation and burning at the Rings. Thomas Hardy used this event in his poem The Mock Wife and mentioned it in his 1886 novel The Mayor of Casterbridge, as well as recording some details of his research into the event in his personal writings.

By the later 18th century, the enclosure was being used as farmland.

In 1846, the proposed alignment of the Southampton and Dorchester Railway was amended in order to protect the Rings.

=== The site today ===
The monument is now a public open space, and used for open-air concerts, festivals and re-enactments. Finds from the excavations are in the Dorset Museum.

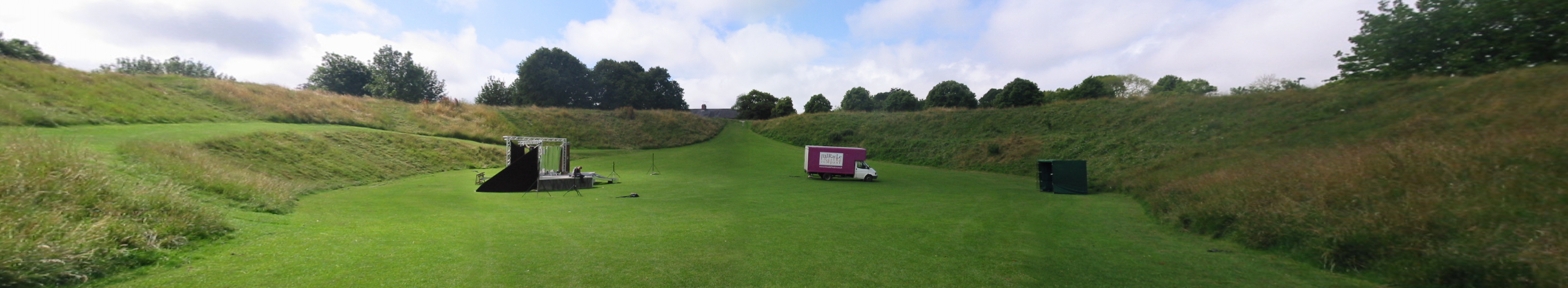
the Maumbury Rings viewed from northern end
