= Poundbury Hill =

Hill fort in Dorset, England

Coordinates: 50.71865°N 2.45182°W

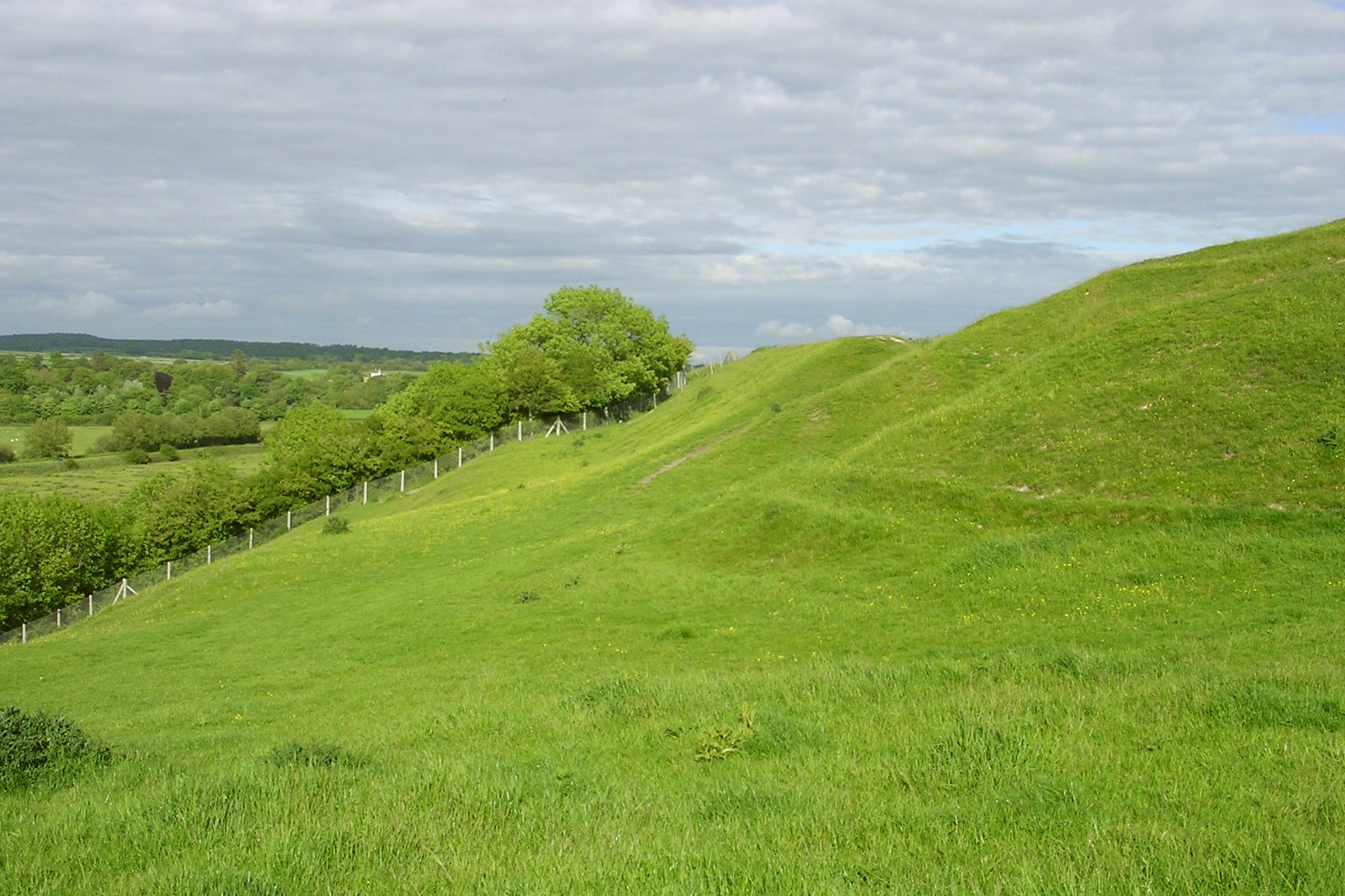
Earthworks at the northwest corner of Poundbury hillfort.

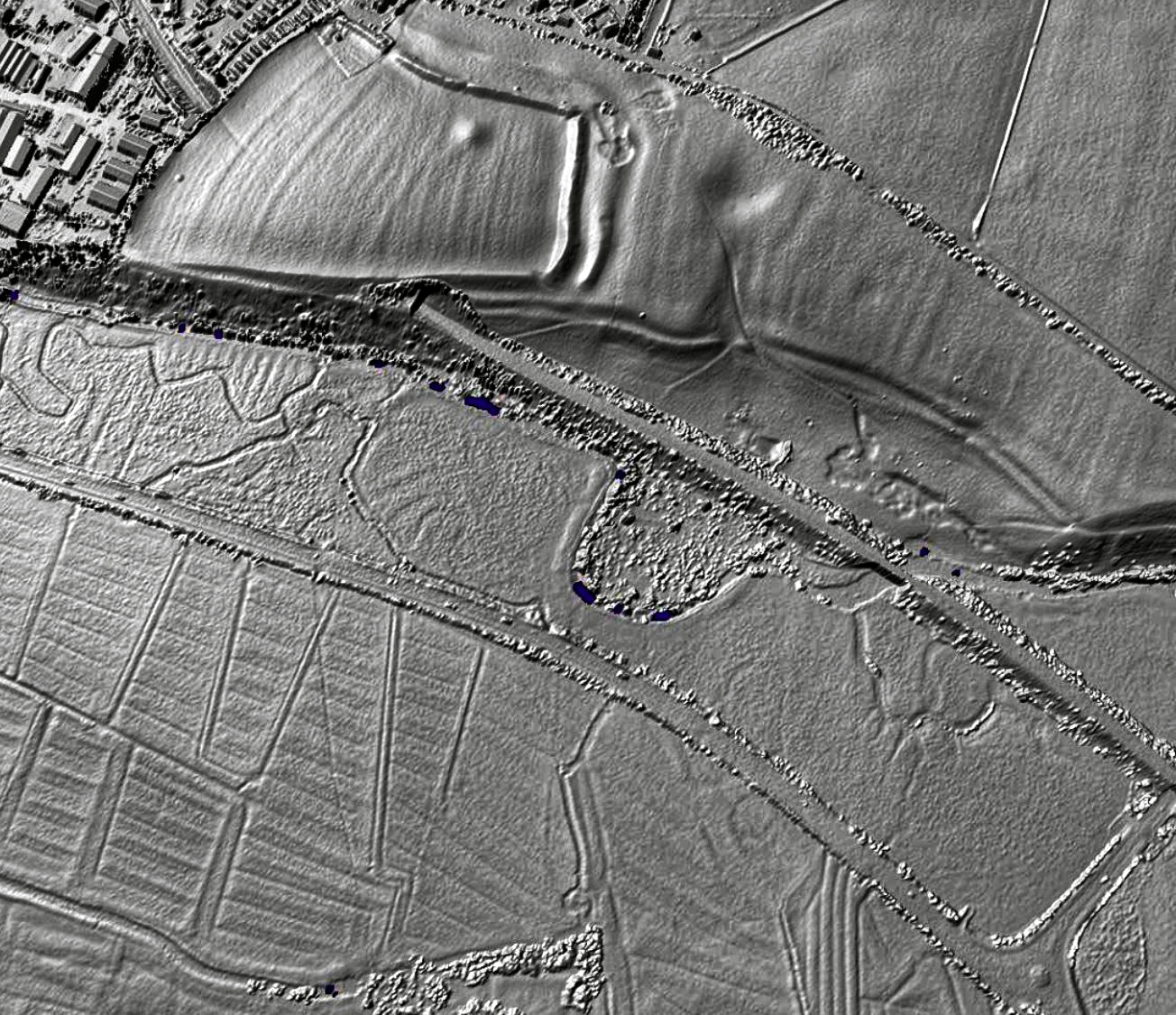
A lidar view of the hillfort.

Poundbury Hill (grid reference SY682911) is the site of a scheduled Prehistoric and Roman archaeological remains and includes evidence of a Neolithic settlement, a substantial Bronze Age occupation site and an Iron Age hillfort. There are also late Iron Age burials and a section of Roman aqueduct. On the eastern side is an earlier Romano-British farmstead; and an extensive later (possibly Christian) cemetery, belonging to the Roman town Durnovaria.

Further buildings and enclosures of the 5th-8th centuries overlie the Roman cemetery. It is roughly rectangular and it is likely that it was designed to command views over the River Frome and the Frome valley to the north. The main entrance to the fort is on the eastern end. It overlooks the county town of Dorchester, Dorset, England.

== Excavation ==
The site was first excavated in 1938. Details of the fort's serial development were discovered. In the 4th century BC, the banks were faced with timber and a deep V-shaped ditch was dug. The banks were enlarged and strengthened and a limestone revetment was added, in circa 50 BC.

== Nearby features ==
=== Cemetery ===
Just outside the fort was a large Romano-British cemetery. The majority of burials date to the late Roman era of the 4th century AD, although the cemetery was in use from the Neolithic times to the Middle Ages. The cemetery, located on the northeast side of the hill fort, was excavated during the 1970s.

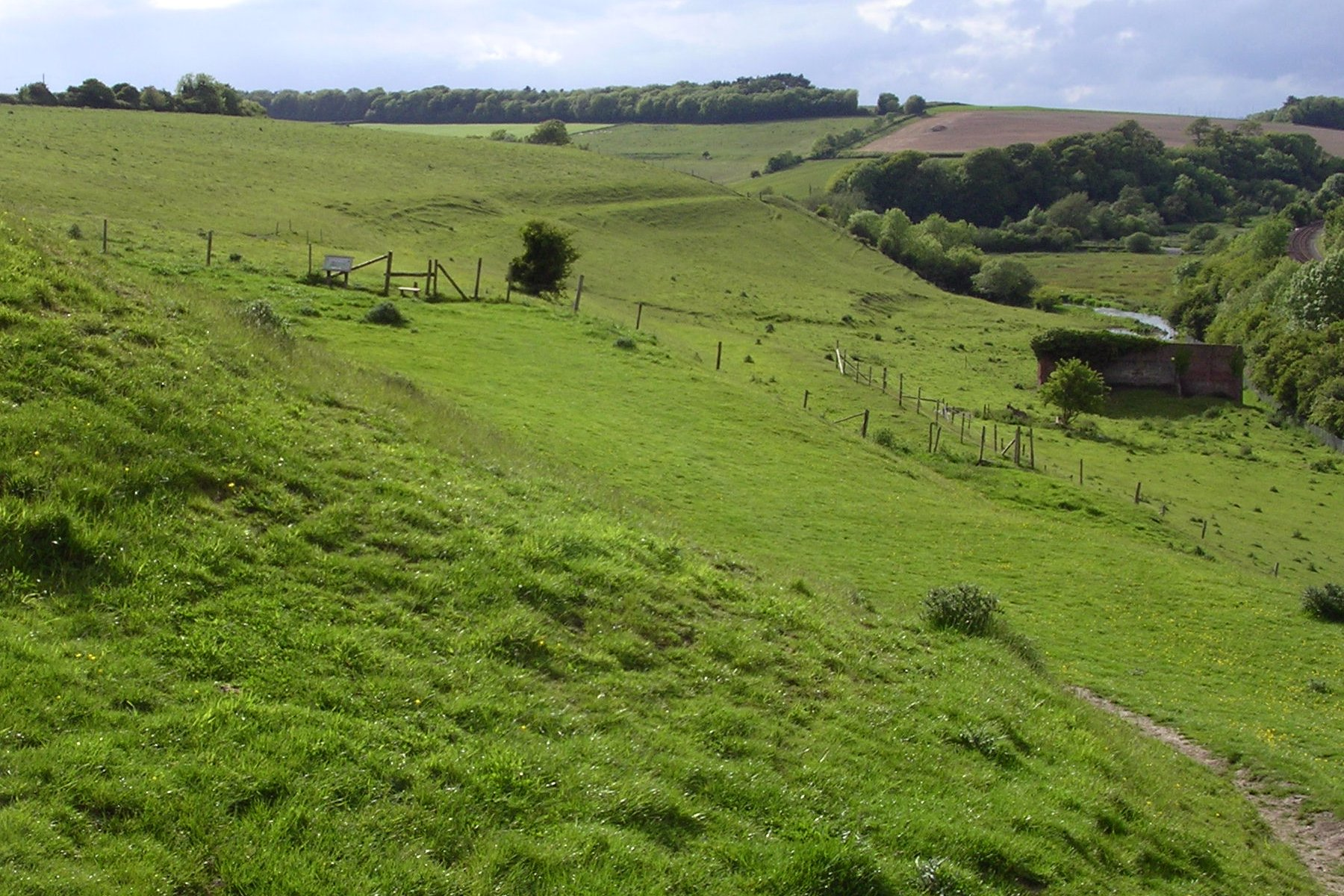
The course of the Roman aqueduct, viewed from the northwest corner of Poundbury hillfort

=== Aqueduct ===
The northern and eastern sides of the hillfort's outer defences were damaged by the construction of the Roman aqueduct which supplied the settlement of Durnovaria (Dorchester) with fresh water from a reservoir around 4.5 km (2.8 mi) away. The aqueduct terrace, situated on the northeast-facing slope of the Frome valley, has a very slight gradient (averaging 1:1750), achieved by a winding route almost 9 km (5.6 mi) long.

This aqueduct (80 cm wide by 30 cm deep) was a small closed channel with clay bottom and wooden sides. It had a wooden cover with a protective covering of soil and grass, to prevent contamination of the water, which was brought from a dam and lake by what is now Littlewood Farm in Frampton. The water was later used for the new town of Dorchester and its public baths. The aqueduct was abandoned in about 160 AD, following the collapse of the reservoir dam in Frampton.

=== Railway line ===
The main Dorchester to Yeovil railway line (now called the Heart of Wessex Line) was tunnelled beneath the hill fort, thereby minimising damage to the ramparts. Brunel originally wanted to put the tracks in a cutting through the site, but local outrage at the plan meant that the more expensive tunnel was chosen. The protest against the Poundbury cutting plan also led to the formation of the Dorset archaeological society.

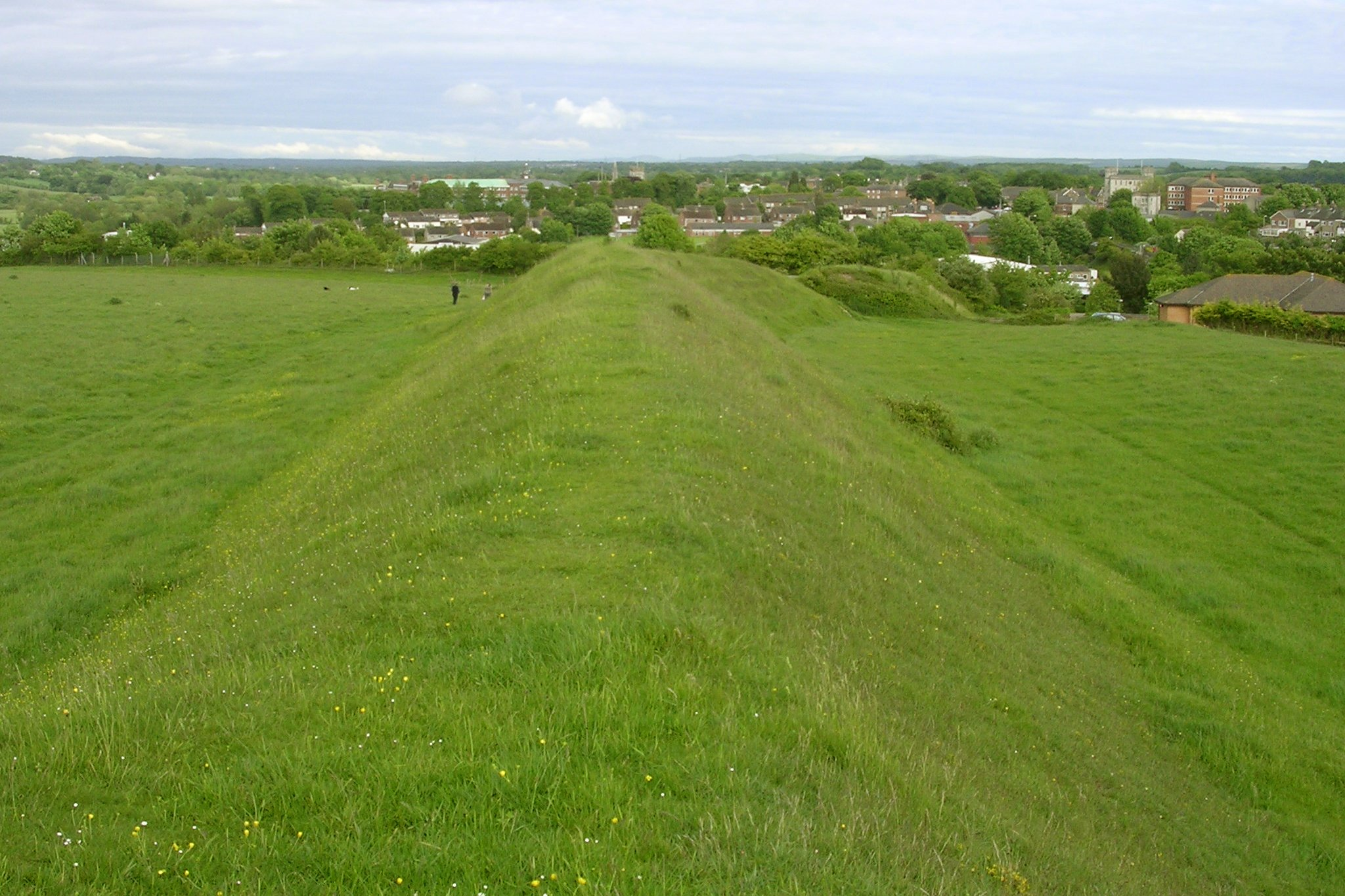
View towards Dorchester along Poundbury hillfort's southern rampart

== See also ==
- Maiden Castle, Dorset
