= Greyhound Yard =

Archaeological site in England

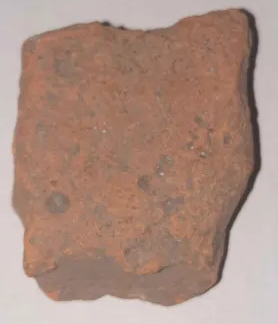
- Tessellated tile from the Roman villa at Greyhound Yard from the 3rd or 4th century

- Location of Greyhound Yard within England
- 50.714213°N 2.436198°W
- Type: Henge, Roman villa
- Periods: Neolithic era, Roman Empire
- Location: Dorchester, United Kingdom
- Part of: Durnovaria

History
- Built: c. 2500 BC

Site notes
- Circumference: 1.2 kilometres (0.75 mi)
- Excavation dates: 1955–6, 1981–84, 1984–89 (Tudor Arcade); 1980s, 1990 (Charles Street)
- Management: Tudor Arcade shopping centre
- Public access: Yes

Greyhound Yard, also known as the Dorchester henge, (grid reference SY693906) is an archaeological site located within the Tudor Arcade shopping centre and the associated Charles Street within Dorchester, United Kingdom. It was once the site of a Neolithic henge and later a range of other buildings including a Roman villa on the outskirts of Durnovaria.

== History ==
=== Neolithic henge ===
A Neolithic henge that was estimated to be around 1.2 kilometres (0.75 mi) in circumference was built using timber from around six hundred trees at Greyhound Yard around 2500 BC, and the excavated postholes date to between 2237–1947 BC. It appears to have fallen out of use by the Early Bronze Age and was likely converted into pasture land.

=== Roman era ===
Around 65–70 AD, Durnovaria was founded on part of the site of the Neolithic henge. Two streets, the forum and part of the bath complex was built on the site of the Neolithic henge during the 1st century AD, and a Roman villa followed shortly after, being present by the 3rd to 4th century AD.

Several town houses were built along Charles Street and they appear to have only existed during a single phase of habitation before being systematically demolished in the late Roman or post-Roman period, likely no later than 600.

=== Later history ===
Most of the stone ruins along Charles Street were robbed between the 12th and 15th centuries, although some Roman ruins on the site were extant until around the 17th century.

Buildings that now house shops were built at Greyhound Yard during the 16th and 17th centuries, while a dovecote and an egg-packing factory also existed on the site.

After the excavations concluded in 1984, a Waitrose was built on the site of the henge at Greyhound Yard; the Tudor Arcade shopping centre was later built around the Waitrose.

At the Tudor Arcade shopping centre, red markers were installed in 1986 in the floor of the car park to denote the locations of the twenty excavated postholes, while at Charles Street, houses at 5–7 Acland Road were built atop the site of Greyhound Yard in 1920 and were demolished in 1990.

== Excavations ==
=== Tudor Arcade ===
A. L. Parke excavated a Roman hypocaust and its associated walls at Greyhound Yard in 1955–6, and the bulk of the excavations happened between 1981–84, when the Neolithic henge and Roman villa were discovered and excavated. The Neolithic henge was last excavated in 1989.

Twenty post holes were identified as belonging to the Neolithic henge, although only a 40 metres (130 ft) arc was excavated by 1984. Calculations have estimated that the entire henge was around 1.2 kilometres (0.75 mi) in circumference.

Many tessellated tiles associated with Room 2521 of the Roman villa (Later Roman Building 2170) were excavated and any tiles that were surplus to the requirements of the Dorset County Museum were sold.

Sampled shafts at Greyhound Yard were reidentified as on-going ritual deposits, notably of sacrificed puppies and black carrion birds— crows, ravens and jackdaws; pottery fragments were also found within the shafts.

=== Charles Street ===
Excavations along Charles Street during the 1980s and in 1990 identified a Roman town house, and during the excavation the opus signinum floors and foundations of the town house were removed to be preserved at the Dorset County Museum; the burial site of two infant children was also identified, suggesting the site lay within the town walls of Durnovaria. After the excavations concluded, council offices and a library were constructed on the site.

In 1990, the concrete foundations of 5–7 Acland Road were identified and a range of coins dating from as early as before the Iron Age and as late as 395 AD were also discovered.
