= Fordington mosaic =

Roman floor mosaic

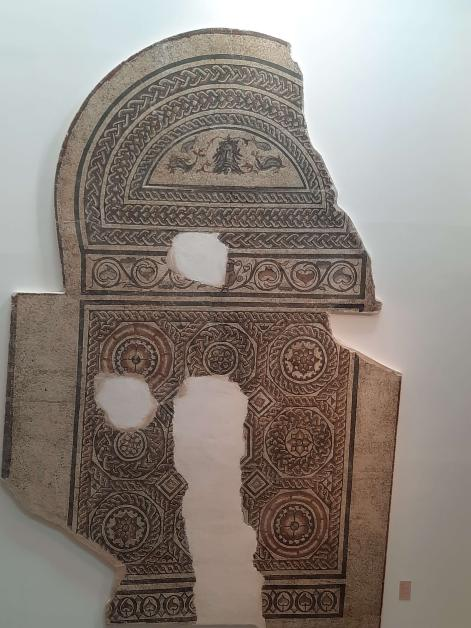
- The Fordington mosaic in 2023
- Artist: Dorchester School of Mosaicists
- Year: 2nd century AD
- Type: Mosaic
- Subject: Oceanus
- Dimensions: 715 cm × 480 cm (23.5 ft 2 in × 15.6 ft 189 in)
- Condition: Partially complete
- Location: Dorset County Museum; Dorchester

The Fordington mosaic, also known as the Fordington High Street mosaic, is a Roman floor mosaic from the 2nd century AD, found in Fordington, Dorchester in England, in what was once Durnovaria; it is now on display at the Dorset Museum. It depicts Oceanus, marine life, and the ocean.

== History ==
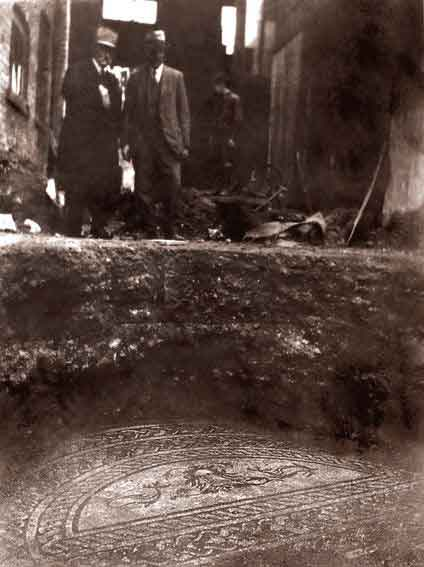
The Fordigton mosaic being excavated in October 1927

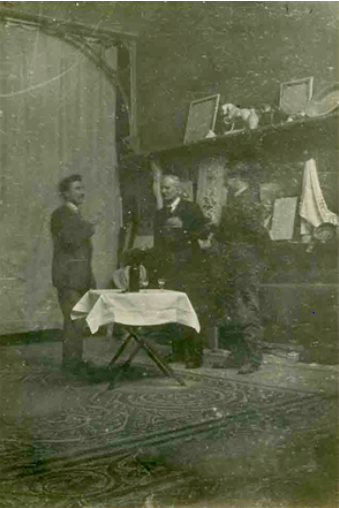
Mosaicists Giomeria Zanetter (left) and Sidney Smith (right) with the Dorset Museum curator Captain John Edward Acland (middle), celebrating the final completion of the laying of the mosaic on 5 December 1927

=== Roman history ===
The Fordington mosaic was created by the Dorchester School of Mosaicists during the 2nd century AD (previously believed to have been created during the 4th century AD); it is believed that they created this mosaic due to their specific style of theming mosaics around sea gods and marine life. It was created for a town house on the outskirts of Durnovaria and was a pavement mosaic.

==== The town house ====
The town house was located on Foundry Yard near 12–14 and 16 High Street, Fordington and was also located near to the town gates of Durnovaria. The town house was probably built no later than the 2nd century AD and was then likely demolished shortly after the Romans left England around 410 AD, suggesting the house was abandoned.

The town house was first excavated in 1927 to preserve the mosaic, and alongside it two knives were found, with one being dated to the Anglo-Saxon period. Two fragments of 1st century AD terra sigillata were then found underneath the mosaic after it had been fully excavated, and the original floor was sealed using flint rubble, painted plaster and ceramic roof tiles from the Roman period.

It was later excavated in 1970, 1998 and 2001 to 2002 and during these excavations, the former location of the mosaic, and the town gates to Durnovaria, were also identified.

=== Modern history ===
The Fordington mosaic was discovered in 1903 on the site of Lott & Walne's Fordington foundry (who were founded in c. 1830 and traded between 1899 and 1953), and it was rediscovered on 5 October 1927 with the help of poet Thomas Hardy, who as a result of excavating the mosaic became ill and died shortly after. The mosaic was lifted in late October 1927 from a pit which reached around 0.9–1.2 metres (3.0–3.9 ft) in depth.

The mosaic was subsequently donated to the museum in November 1927 by Proprietors J. J. Walne and O.C. Vidler and was installed into the floor of the Dorset Museum by Giomeria Zanetter and Sidney Smith (the completion date of the mosaic installation was 5 December 1927). It was then described by Vidler in 1928.

The mosaic stayed in the floor of the museum until it was dismantled and moved onto the Atrium wall of the museum shortly before the museum reopened in May 2021; the conservation work was undertaken by Lee Kimber, Richard Ball and Brian Bentley.

== Description ==
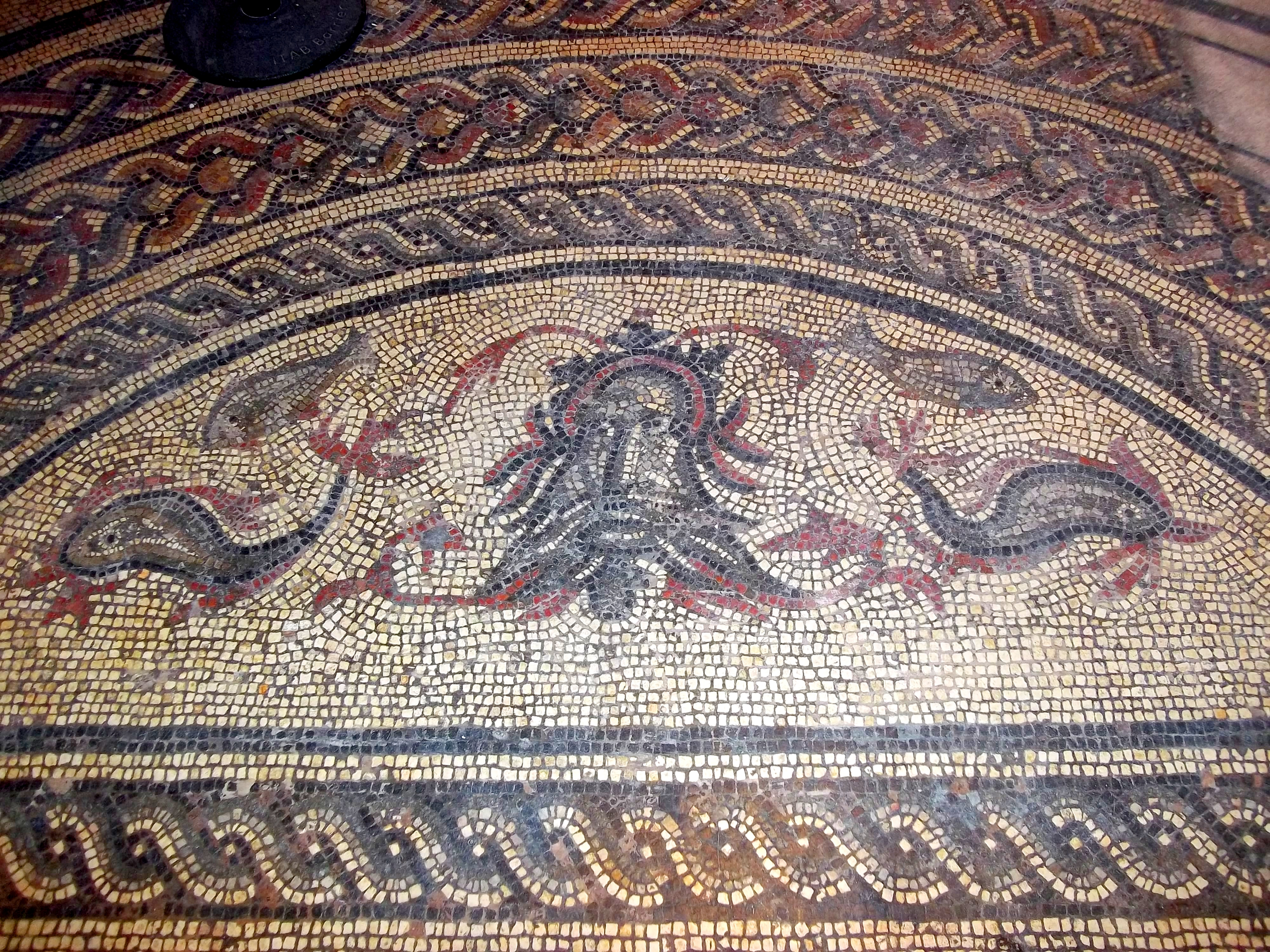
Detail of Oceanus as depicted on the Fordington mosaic

The mosaic is incomplete, with parts of the lower section of the mosaic no longer existing today, and its design consists of a head of Oceanus, two dolphins and red-finned fish, while six red tesserae of a figure once occupying the central octagon are also present.

It has been described as being identical in style to pavement mosaics of a similar date found at Bignor and Cirencester and it measures 715 cm × 480 cm (23.5 ft 2 in × 15.6 ft 189 in).
