= Durnovaria =

Archeological site in the United Kingdom

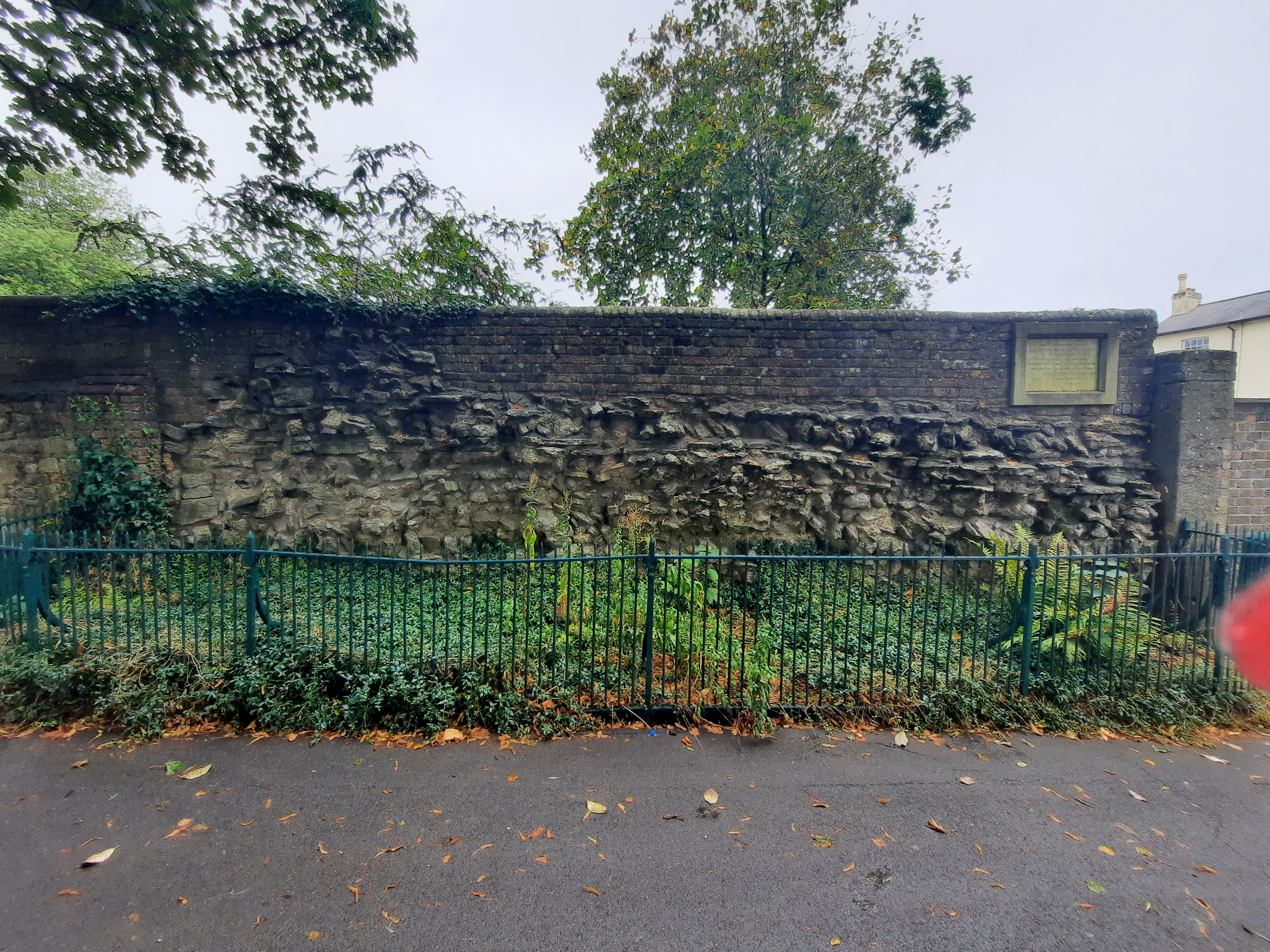
- Surviving fragment of the town walls of Durnovaria

- Location of Durnovaria within England
- 50.715°N 2.437°W
- Type: Roman city
- Periods: Roman Empire
- Location: Dorchester, United Kingdom

History
- Built: c. 65 or 70 AD
- Abandoned: likely shortly after c. 410 AD

Durnovaria is a suggested spelling for the Latin form of the name of the Roman town of Dorchester in the modern English county of Dorset, amended from the actually observed Durnonovaria. Upon the assumption that the name was originally Brythonic, it is suggested that the first element in the name, *durno- may mean "fist" like (Welsh dwrn ‘fist, knob’) and the second may be related to Old Irish fáir ~ fóir denoting a confined area or den. A simpler amendment (one letter instead of two) would lead to *Duronovaria, making this place one of up to 18 ancient British names that contain Duro- and mostly occur at river crossings, while -novaria has two possible ancient parallels in Britain associated with river junctions. That analysis would perfectly fit the geographical situation of Dorchester.

== Romans at Maiden Castle ==
The pre-Roman population centre in the area appears to have been at the hill fort of Maiden Castle, 2 miles (3 kilometres) southwest of the town centre. The inhabitants appear to have resisted the Roman invasion and their war cemetery was excavated in the 1930s by Mortimer Wheeler. It later became the site of a 4th-century Romano-British temple.

== Roman Dorchester ==
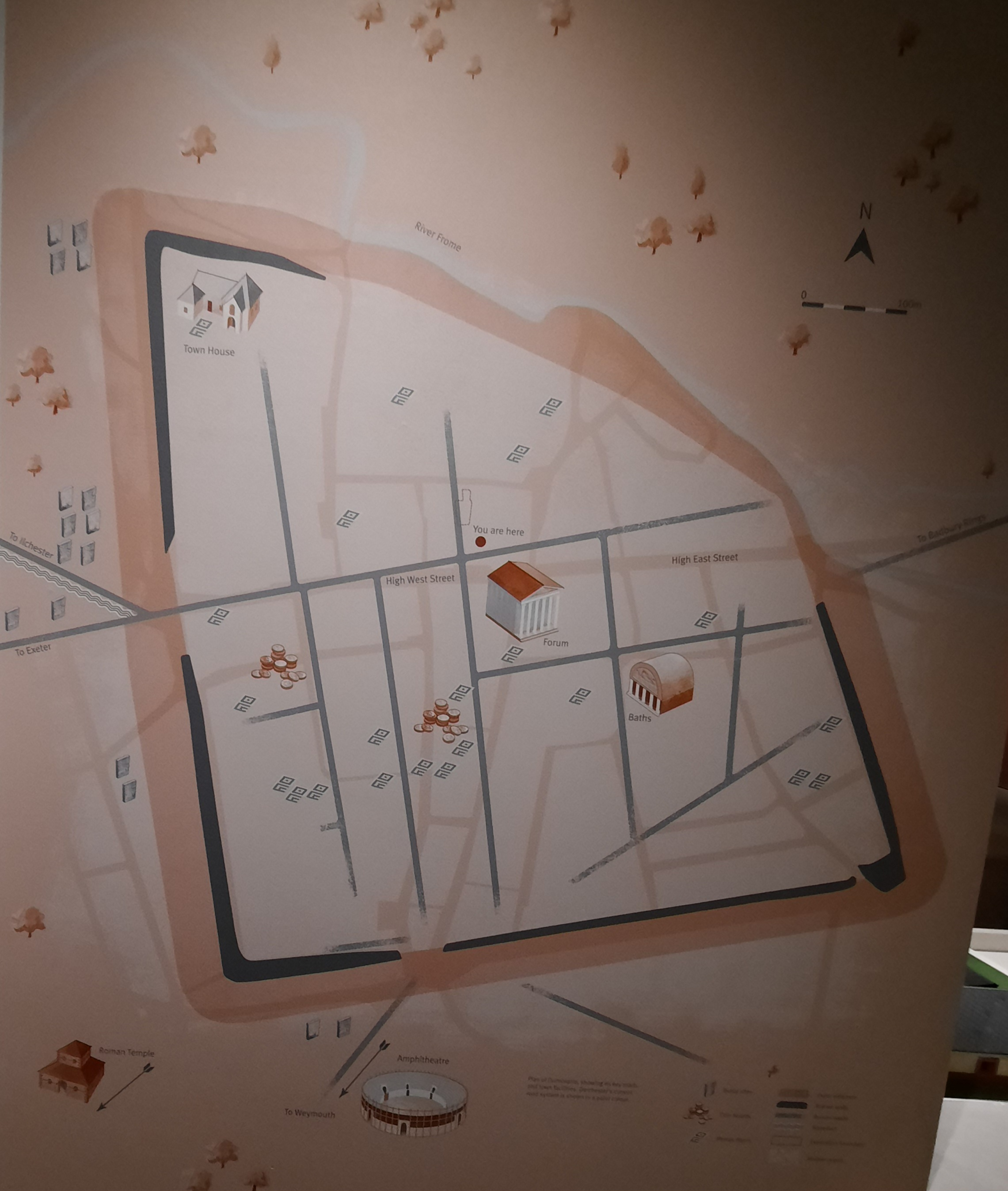
Map of Durnovaria around 70 AD

The site of present-day Dorchester may have originally been a small garrison fort for the Legio II Augusta established shortly after the Roman conquest on the site of Greyhound Yard. When the military moved away, around AD 65–70, Durnovaria became a civilian settlement, apparently the civitas Durotrigum of the tribal confederacy of the Durotriges. Shafts were dug to deposit ritual foundation items. An organised street plan was laid out, ignoring earlier boundaries; the streets lined with timber-slot structures; public buildings including thermae were erected and an artificial water supply established. The town seems to have become one of twin capitals for the local Durotriges tribe.

It was an important local market centre, particularly for Purbeck marble, shale and the pottery industries from Poole Harbour and the New Forest. The town remained small, around the central and southern areas of the present settlement, until expansion to the north-west, around Colliton Park, in the 2nd century. By the middle of this century, the town defences were added and Maumbury Rings, a Neolithic henge monument, was converted for use as an amphitheatre.

The third century saw the first replacement of timber buildings with stone ones, an unexpectedly late development in an area with several good sources of building stone. There were many fine homes for rich families and their excavated mosaic floors suggest a mosaic school of art had a workshop in the town, members of which seem to have travelled in the area to execute mosaic floors in villas away from Durnovaria itself. A large late-Roman and Christian cemetery has been excavated at Poundbury just to the west of the town, but little is known of Durnovaria's decline after the departure of the Roman administration. The name, however, survived to become the Anglo-Saxon Dornwaraceaster and modern 'Dorchester'. The residents of modern day Dorchester are known as Durnovarians.

== Extant remains ==
The town still has some Roman features, including part of the town walls and the foundations of a Roman town house, which are freely accessible near County Hall. There are many Roman finds in the County Museum. The Romans built an aqueduct to supply the town with water; traces remain at nearby Whitfield Farm and approaching Poundbury tunnel on the Dorchester - Yeovil railway. Near the town centre is Maumbury Rings, an ancient British earthwork converted by the Romans for use as an amphitheatre, and to the north west is Poundbury Hill, another pre-Roman fortification.

Part of a Roman road, known today as High West Street, exists underneath the Dorset Museum, and a portion of it is displayed within the museum. The road ran through the centre of Durnovaria.

There is little evidence to show whether or not Durnovaria survived into the post-Roman era: Gildas' record of a tradition, given in De Excidio et Conquestu Britanniae iii, of twenty-eight cities and sundry castles of former happy times was not provided with any names. Surviving northern boundaries of the administrative region, or civitas that included Dorset, reached as far as Selwood, and mark the county division between Somerset and Wiltshire to this day. In the sub-Roman period, as urban centres were progressively abandoned, the centres of administration and justice, such as they were, generally removed to fortified strongholds. The city's site is attested as Dornwaraceaster in the ninth century, elided to produce Dornaceaster, first recorded in 937.

== Gallery ==
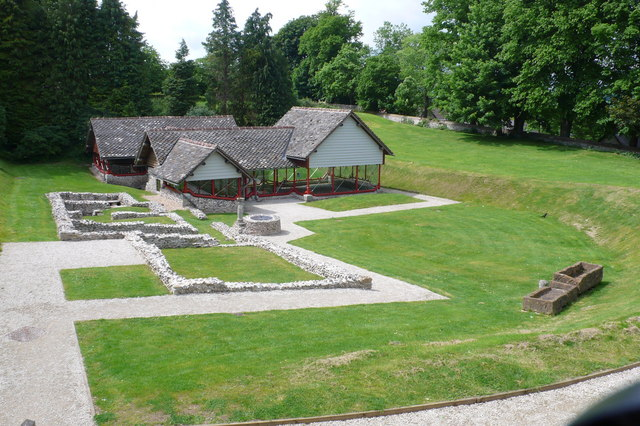
Roman ruins in Dorchester (Durnovaria), Dorset, England (Roman Town House)

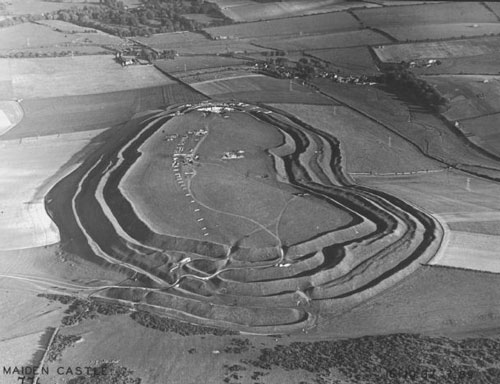
Excavations at Maiden Castle in October 1937. Photograph by Major George Allen (1891–1940).

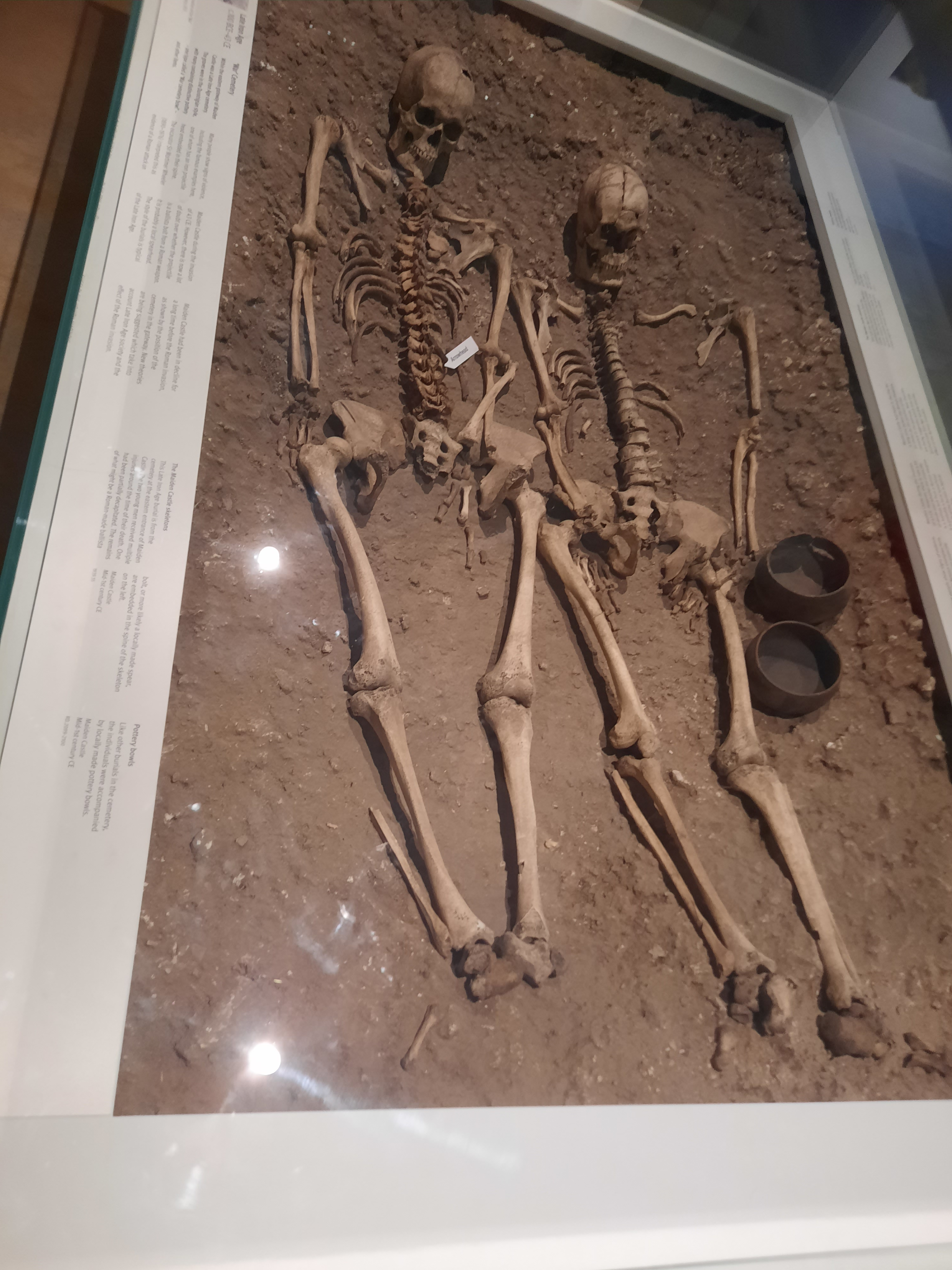
Burials at the war cemetery at Maiden Castle, which date to the late Iron Age, c. 100 BC - 43 AD

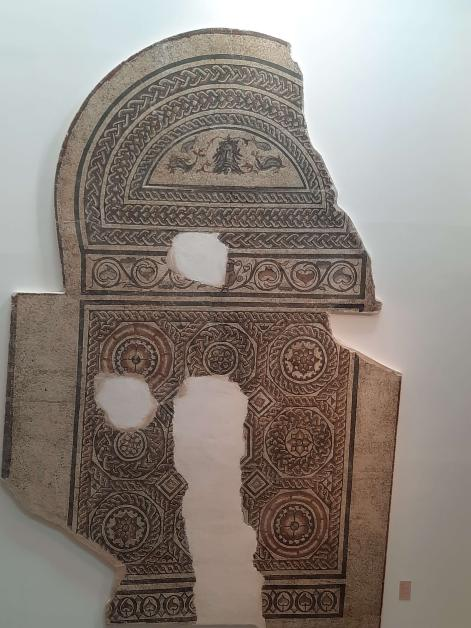
The 4th century Fordington mosaic from a town house in Durnovaria

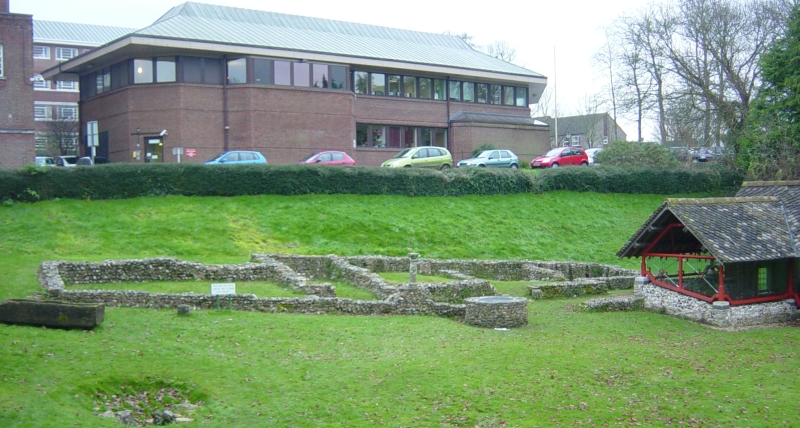
Roman town house ruins

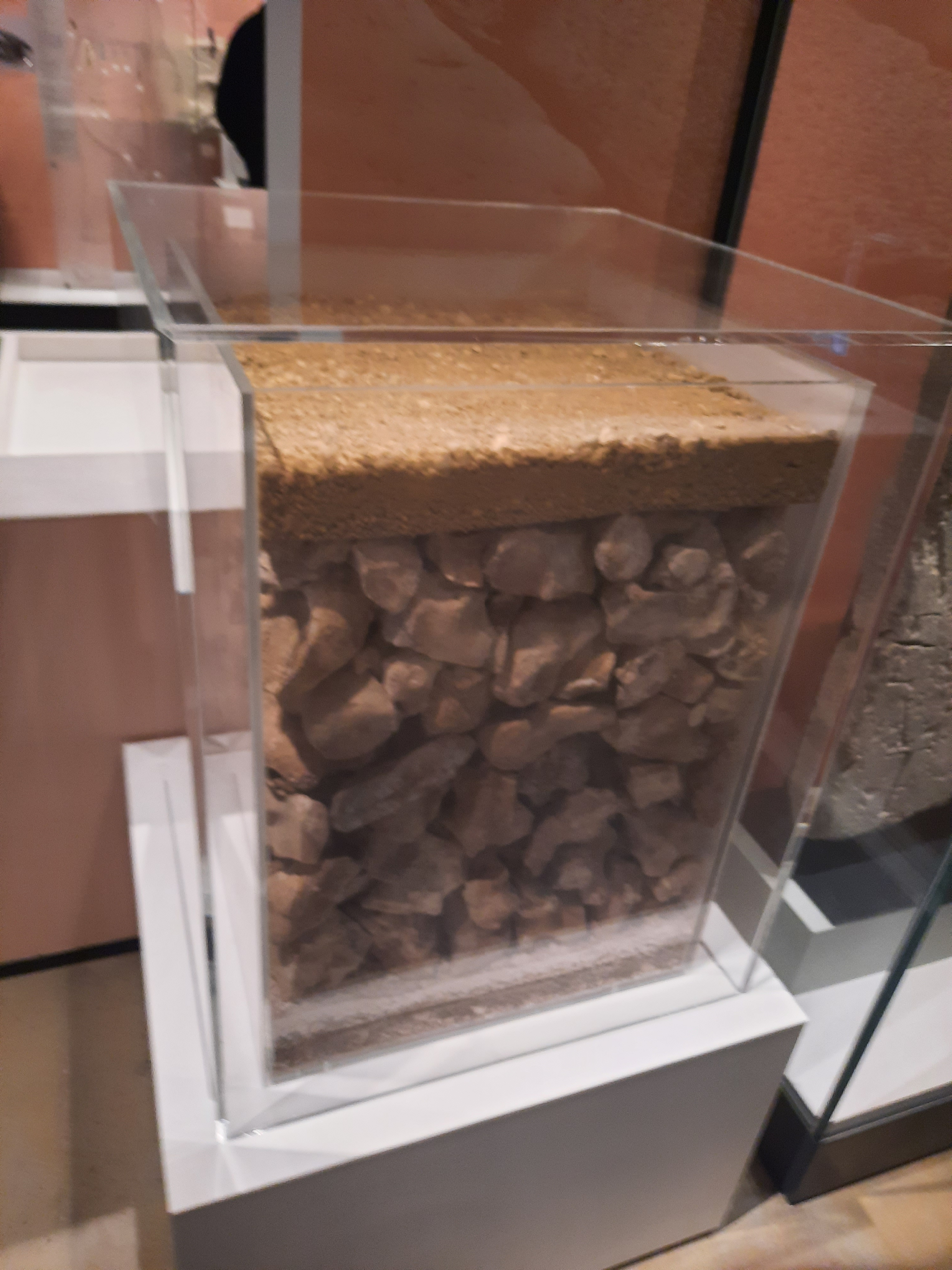
Preserved fragment of the Roman road that is known today as High West Street
