= David Musselwhite =

David Musselwhite (3 December 1940 – 23 February 2010) was a British literary critic and academic.

== Life ==
He was born in Bristol and studied first at Cambridge University, then later at the University of Essex, where he subsequently became a Senior Lecturer. He also taught in Argentina, at the University of the West Indies in Jamaica, and at Curtin University in Western Australia.

He was the author of two books – Partings Welded Together: Politics and Desire in the Nineteenth-Century English Novel (Methuen, 1987), and Social Transformations in Hardy’s Tragic Novels: Megamachines and Phantasms (Palgrave Macmillan, 2003). Both books were widely reviewed, with the latter described by Tim Armstrong as “...a theoretically provocative and fascinating study.” (The Modern Language Review) and by Andrew Radford as "...not only accessible to Hardy enthusiasts, but necessary to academic specialists".

He initiated the Essex Sociology of Literature Project at the University of Essex in 1976. This involved a set of conferences that according to literary critic, Terry Eagleton "...have a quasi-mythological status in the minds of some who weren’t even born at the time".

His main research areas were the English novel, Latin American literature, and the Enlightenment, and he published numerous articles in these fields.

== Publications ==
=== Books ===
Partings Welded Together: Politics and Desire in the Nineteenth-Century English Novel, Methuen, 1987.

Social Transformations in Hardy's Tragic Novels: Megamachines and Phantasms, Palgrave Macmillan, 2003.

=== Articles ===
- "El Perseguidor: un modelo para desarmar", Nuevos Aires, No. 8, Buenos Aires, 1972, 23-36
- "El astillero en marcha", Nuevos Aires, No. 11, Buenos Aires, 1973, 3-15
- "Cecilia Valdes", New World, Jamaica, 1973
- "Los Premios entre lo todo y la nada", Cuadernos Hispanoamericanos, Número 314-315, (Agosto-Septiembre), Madrid, 1976, 520-566
- "La vida y la muerte de Berthe Trepat", Cuadernos Hispanoamericanos, Número 320-21 (Febrero y Marzo), Madrid 1977, 341-359
- "Women in Love: a flawed novel", Essays in Poetics, Vol. I, No. 1 Keele 1976, 48-60
- "Wuthering Heights: the unacceptable text", Red Letters, No. 2, 1976, 3-5
- "Towards a political aesthetics", Literature, Society and the Sociology of Literature, Proceedings of the Essex Conference, ed. F. Barker et al., Essex, 1976, 8-17
- "The novel as narcotic", Proceedings of the Essex Conference, ed. F. Barker et al. Essex, 1978, 207-224
- "The Trial of Warren Hastings", Proceedings of the Essex Conference, ed. F. Barker et al., Essex, 1982, 226-251
- "Notes on a journey to Vanity Fair", Literature and History, 1982
- "Reflections on Burke's Reflections 1790/1990", in The Enlightenment and its Shadows, ed. Peter Hulme and Ludmilla Jordanova, Methuen, 1990, 142-162
- "Hardy's Mega-Machines", in Thomas Hardy: Revista Portuguesa de Estudios Anglo-Americanos, Oporto, 1992, 69-92
- "Death and the Phantasm: A Reading of Cortázar's 'Babas del diablo!", Romance Studies 18, June 2000, 57-68
- "Phantasm and Nation: Sarmiento's Facundo", New Comparison 29 (Spring 2000), 5-26
- "Tess of the d'Urbervilles: 'A Becoming Woman' or Deleuze and Guattari go to Wessex", Textual Practice, 14.3, 2000, 499-518
- "The Colombia of Maria: un paìs de cafres", Romance Studies Vol. 24 (1), March 2006, 41-54
- "Deleuze Goes to Xanadu", Deleuze Studies, vol. 1 no. 2, Dec 2007, 100-125
- "Heart of Darkness: A Minority Report", Salt, issue 3, 2010

== Obituary ==
- Del Valle Alcalá, Roberto (2010) "David E. Musselwhite, 1940-2010", 'The European English Messenger', 19.2 View entire article in pdf: http://www.britannica.com/bps/additionalcontent/18/57457689/Obituaries
