= East Dorset District Council elections =

Local government elections in Dorset, England

Map showing the composition of East Dorset District Council as of the last election in 2015. Conservatives in blue, Liberal Democrats in yellow and independents in grey.

East Dorset District Council in Dorset, England existed from 1973 to 2019, when it was abolished and subsumed into Dorset Council.

== Political control ==
From the first election to the council in 1973 until its abolition in 2019 political control of the council was held by the following parties:

Party in control	Years
Independent	1973–1976
Conservative	1976–1995
Liberal Democrats	1995–1999
Conservative	1999–2019

=== Leadership ===
The leaders of the council from 1999 until the council's abolition in 2019 were:

Councillor	Party	From	To
Derek Burt	Conservative	1999	12 May 2008
Spencer Flower	Conservative	12 May 2008	2 Sep 2013
Ian Monks	Conservative	2 Sep 2013	14 Dec 2015
Spencer Flower	Conservative	28 Jan 2016	31 Mar 2019

Spencer Flower went on to be appointed leader of the replacement Dorset Council at its first meeting in May 2019.

== Council elections ==
Summary of the council composition after recent council elections, click on the year for full details of each election. Boundary changes took place for the 2003 and 2015 elections.

- 1973 Wimborne District Council election
- 1976 Wimborne District Council election
- 1979 Wimborne District Council election
- 1983 Wimborne District Council election (New ward boundaries)
- 1987 Wimborne District Council election
- 1991 East Dorset District Council election

Year	Conservative	Liberal Democrats	Independent	Notes
1995	13	23	0	District boundary changes took place but the number of seats remained the same
1999	26	9	1	
2003	24	11	1	New ward boundaries
2007	25	11	0	
2011	30	6	0	
2015	24	3	2	New ward boundaries

== District result maps ==
2003 results map

2007 results map

2011 results map

2015 results map

== By-election results ==
By-elections occur when seats become vacant between council elections. Below is a summary of recent by-elections; full by-election results can be found by clicking on the by-election name.

By-election	Date	Incumbent party	Winning party
Sixpenny Handley	18 September 1997	Liberal Democrats	Liberal Democrats
Alderholt by-election	23 October 2008	Conservative	Conservative
Ferndown Central by-election	23 July 2009	Conservative	Conservative
Corfe Mullen South by-election	15 July 2010	Liberal Democrats	Liberal Democrats
Colehill East by-election	17 July 2014	Liberal Democrats	Liberal Democrats
Alderholt by-election	3 March 2016	Conservative	Conservative
Parley by-election	1 September 2016	Conservative	Conservative
Verwood East by-election	12 July 2018	Conservative	Conservative
Ferndown Central by-election	25 October 2018	Conservative	Conservative
