= Daggons Road railway station =

Disused railway station in Dorset, England

Coordinates: 50.9120°N 1.8401°W

Daggons Road
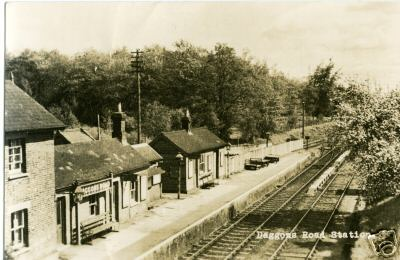

General information
- Location: Alderholt, Dorset; England
- Grid reference: SU113126
- Platforms: 1

Other information
- Status: Disused

History
- Original company: Salisbury and Dorset Junction Railway
- Pre-grouping: London and South Western Railway
- Post-grouping: Southern Railway; Southern Region of British Railways

Key dates
- 1 January 1876: Opened
- 4 May 1964: Closed
Location

Daggons Road was a railway station serving the village of Alderholt, in Dorset, to the south west of Fordingbridge, in Hampshire. It was one of many casualties of the mass closure of British railway lines in the 1960s and 1970s; the last service was on 2 May 1964. It was on the Salisbury and Dorset Junction Railway, which ran north–south along the River Avon just to the West of the New Forest, connecting Salisbury to the North and Poole to the south.

Today, the road through the centre of Alderholt village is still called Station Road, changing to Daggons Road at the point where the line crossed the road. A residential cul-de-sac named Station Yard (previously Daggons Road) occupies the land where the station once stood on the north side of Daggons Road, and there is another named Churchill Close opposite to the south.

Preceding station	Disused railways	Following station
Fordingbridge	British Rail; Southern Region; Salisbury and Dorset Junction Railway	Verwood
