= Fordingbridge railway station =

Disused railway station in Hampshire, England

Coordinates: 50.9287°N 1.8081°W

Fordingbridge
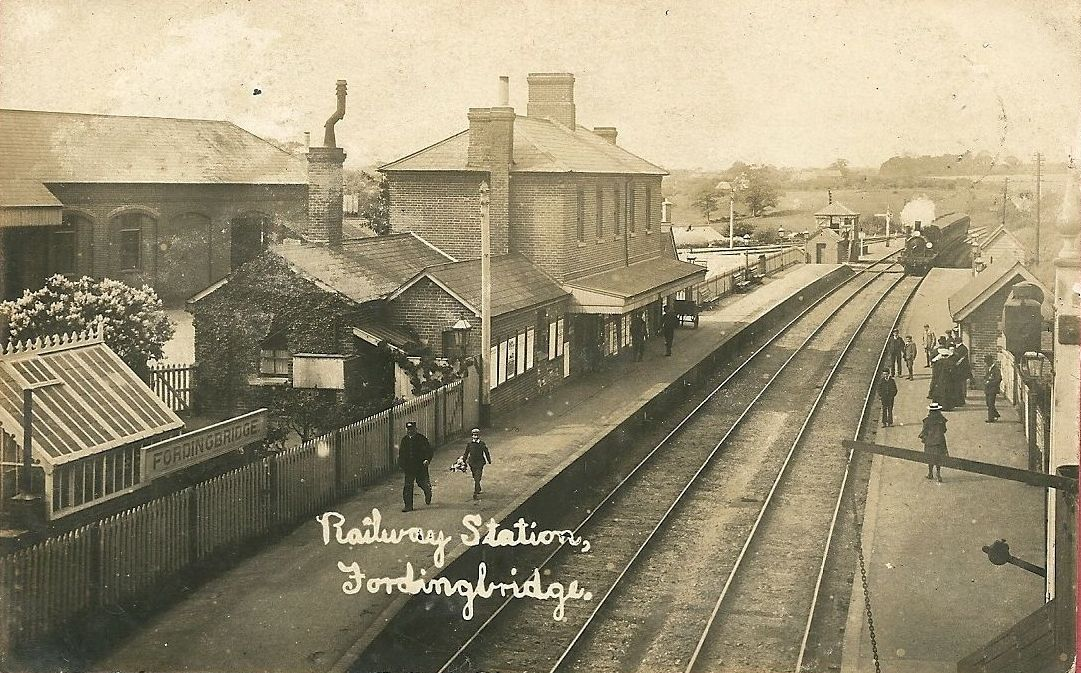

General information
- Location: Fordingbridge, New Forest; England
- Grid reference: SU135144
- Platforms: 2

Other information
- Status: Disused

History
- Pre-grouping: Salisbury & Dorset Junction Railway; London and South Western Railway
- Post-grouping: Southern Railway; Southern Region of British Railways

Key dates
- 20 December 1866: Opened
- 4 May 1964: Closed
Location

Fordingbridge was a railway station serving Fordingbridge, a small town in Hampshire. It was one of many casualties of the mass closure of British railway lines in the 1960s and 1970s. The line was officially closed on 4 May 1964, but as there was no Sunday service the last trains ran on the 2nd. It was served by the Salisbury and Dorset Junction Railway, a line running north–south, along the River Avon just to the west of the New Forest, connecting Salisbury to the North and Poole to the south, meeting the Southampton and Dorchester Railway at West Moors.

Today, the road leading out of Fordingbridge to Sandleheath village is still called Station Road; however, the spot where the station once stood is now occupied by a large mill and industrial park. Ashford Road is where the railway cottages are, the road joins onto Station Road.

Preceding station	Disused railways	Following station
Breamore	British Rail; Southern Region; Salisbury and Dorset Junction Railway	Daggons Road
