= Philip Mason =

British historian (1906–1999)

Philip Mason, CIE, OBE, FRSL (19 March 1906 – 25 January 1999), was a British civil servant in India and writer. After a career in the Indian Civil Service which was cut short by Indian independence, he returned to England to take up farming and writing, later becoming involved in the nascent field of race relations. He is best known for his two-volume book on the British Raj, The Men Who Ruled India (written under the pseudonym 'Philip Woodruff', the latter being his mother's maiden name), and his study of the Indian Army, A Matter of Honour (1974).

== Early life and education ==
Philip Mason was one of three children – two sons and a daughter – of Herbert Alfred Mason (1876–1968), a general practitioner at Duffield, Derbyshire, and his wife Ethel Addison (1880–1956), daughter of Herbert Addison Woodruff, an engineer and manager of a Cammell Laird steel factory. The Mason family had been farmers for several generations at Barrowden in Rutland, East Midlands; his great-grandfather Henry brewed beer and sold malting barley to brewers, and his grandfather George Mason "grew first-class malting barley and reared Leicester lambs". On the basis that "Woodruff" struck him as "a prettier, a more unusual, and a more romantic name than plain ordinary Mason", he "decided very early to be Philip Woodruff Mason and was known by that name until (he) was thirteen and had to produce a birth certificate."

Mason was educated at Sedbergh School and Balliol College, Oxford, taking a first-class degree in Modern Greats. He published two volumes of autobiography, A Shaft of Sunlight: Memories of a Varied Life (Andre Deutsch, 1978) and a sequel, A Thread of Silk: Further Memories of a Varied Life (Michael Russell, 1984).

== Career with the Indian Civil Service ==
Mason worked for the Indian Civil Service from 1928 to 1947. He was an under-secretary in the War Department from 1933 to 1936, in that year being appointed Deputy Commissioner at Garhwal and remaining in this position until 1939. During the Second World War, he held appointments in the Defence and War Departments at Delhi (Deputy Secretary, Defence Co-ordination and War Departments 1939–42; Secretary of the Chiefs of Staff Committee, India and Head of Conference Secretary, South-East Asia Command 1942–4, Joint Secretary, War Department 1944–7), retiring in 1947 intending to take up farming.

== Race and decolonisation ==
With his farming efforts, even supplemented by the income from his writing, proving insufficiently remunerative for the needs of his growing family, Mason took the part-time position as the first Director of Studies of the Royal Institute of International Affairs at Chatham House, serving in this capacity from 1952 to 1958. Mason's role was to both undertake research and seek out scholarly work on disciplines relating to racial problems; he first went to Southern Rhodesia, at the time when it was embarking upon a union with Northern Rhodesia and Nyasaland. Three volumes, The Birth of a Dilemma (1958), The Two Nations, and The Year of Decision (the second undertaken by a junior colleague, but the first and third by Mason) resulted from this research. By 1958, his position at Chatham House translated into directorship of the independent Institute of Race Relations; during this time, Mason focused on Latin America, producing Patterns in Dominance (1970), the last book he wrote before retiring in 1969.

Mason was strongly influenced by Octave Mannoni's use of The Tempest to illuminate the colonial situation – Prospero as imperialist – and in his own book of 1962, Prospero's Magic: Some Thoughts on Class and Race, he extended Mannoni's symbolism to cover the Third World in general, noting how "in my country until a generation ago we liked Prospero ... some of us are beginning not to like him".

== Marriage and later life ==
In retirement, Mason wrote nine more books, before encroaching blindness ended his literary endeavours (he had previously suffered temporary blindness in 1941 after a shooting accident). These works included a biography of Rudyard Kipling and two autobiographical volumes.

In 1935, Mason had married (Eileen) Mary, daughter of Courtenay Hayes, of Charmouth, Dorset, and niece of senior Indian Army officer Major-General Sir William Twiss. They had two sons and two daughters. Mason lived at Mulberry House, Church Street, Fordingbridge, Hampshire (formerly at Hither Daggons, Brock's Hill, Cripplestyle, in the parish of Alderholt, near Fordingbridge), where he died. He had been appointed OBE in 1942 and CIE in 1946.

== See also ==
- Wind of Change
