= 2015 East Dorset District Council election =

2015 UK local government election

Map of the results of the 2015 East Dorset District Council election. Conservatives in blue, Liberal Democrats in yellow and independents in grey.

The 2015 East Dorset District Council election was held on 7 May 2015 to elect members of the District Council of East Dorset, England. The whole council was up for election after boundary changes reduced the number of seats by seven. The Conservative Party stayed in overall control of the council.

== Background ==
Before the election, the Conservatives controlled the council with 30 councillors, whilst the Liberal Democrats with just six seats were the only other party on the council. However, in December 2014 the former leader of Dorset County Council councillor Spencer Flower was suspended from the Conservative Party after being charged by police and both Flower and his wife Toni Coombs stood for re-election as independents at the 2015 election. As they were the only candidates in Verwood West ward they were elected without opposition.

In three other wards, Crane, Handley Vale and Verwood East, the Conservative candidates were also unopposed. This meant 12 wards had elections in 2015 with a total of 66 candidates contesting them.

Boundary changes since the last election in 2011 reduced the number of councillors from 36 to 29. These changes also reduced the number of wards to 16, with four wards electing three councillors, five electing two and seven electing one.

== Election result ==
The Conservatives remained in control of the council with 24 of the 29 seats. The only three contested seats that were not won by the Conservatives, were won by the Liberal Democrats, who won both seats in Wimborne Minster, as well as one seat in Colehill East.

East Dorset local election result 2015
Party	Seats	Gains	Losses	Net gain/loss	Seats %	Votes %	Votes	+/−
Conservative	24			-6	82.8	55.1	44,844	-5.7%
Liberal Democrats	3			-3	10.3	13.6	11,069	-15.6%
Independent	2			+2	6.9	3.0	2,470	+3.0%
UKIP	0			0	0	23.6	19,240	+16.3%
Green	0			0	0	2.4	1,985	+2.4%
Labour	0			0	0	2.2	1,806	-0.5%

== Ward results ==
Alderholt
Party	Candidate	Votes	%	±%
Conservative	Ian Monks	1,133	62.8	
UKIP	Keith Mayo	338	18.7	
Green	Aaron Mudd	332	18.4	
Majority		795	44.1	
Turnout		1,803	71.8	

Ameysford
Party	Candidate	Votes	%	±%
Conservative	Cathy Lugg	1,145	68.4	
UKIP	Lawrence Wilson	529	31.6	
Majority		616	36.8	
Turnout		1,674	70.0	

Colehill East (2 seats)
Party	Candidate	Votes	%	±%
Liberal Democrats	Janet Dover	1,858		
Conservative	K. D. Johnson	1,333		
Conservative	Graeme Smith	1,230		
Liberal Democrats	Barry Roberts	1,080		
UKIP	Brian Lowe	548		
UKIP	Stefan Morawiec	415		
Turnout		6,464	73.9	

Colehill West
Party	Candidate	Votes	%	±%
Conservative	David Packer	927	53.4	
Liberal Democrats	Linda Dickins	617	35.5	
UKIP	Stephen Homer	193	11.1	
Majority		310	17.8	
Turnout		1,737	83.4	

Corfe Mullen (3 seats)
Party	Candidate	Votes	%	±%
Conservative	Sarah Burns	2,420		
Conservative	Derek Burt	2,202		
Conservative	Paul Harrison	2,018		
Liberal Democrats	Bill Honeyman	1,924		
Liberal Democrats	Stewart Hearn	1,791		
Liberal Democrats	Jason Jones	1,534		
UKIP	Dave Evans	985		
UKIP	David Mattocks	940		
UKIP	Josephine Evans	866		
Labour	David Peden	452		
Turnout		15,132	71.4	

Crane
Party	Candidate	Votes	%	±%
Conservative	Steve Butler	unopposed		

Ferndown Central (3 seats)
Party	Candidate	Votes	%	±%
Conservative	Steve Lugg	2,645		
Conservative	Julie Robinson	2,351		
Conservative	Peter Oggelsby	2,315		
UKIP	Geoff Laidlaw	1,336		
UKIP	Sue Laidlaw	1,334		
UKIP	Peter Lucas	1,100		
Labour	David Lee	744		
Turnout		11,825	68.4	

Hampreston and Longham
Party	Candidate	Votes	%	±%
Conservative	George Russell	1,374	72.9	
UKIP	Lyn Ovens	511	27.1	
Majority		863	45.8	
Turnout		1,885	72.0	

Handley Vale
Party	Candidate	Votes	%	±%
Conservative	Simon Tong	unopposed		

Parley (2 seats)
Party	Candidate	Votes	%	±%
Conservative	Barbara Manuel	1,899		
Conservative	John Wilson	1,740		
UKIP	Ann Miller	859		
UKIP	Kenny Pearce	790		
Independent	Peter Durant	309		
Green	Nigel Bales	288		
Green	Martyn Rainer	246		
Turnout		6,131	74.0	

St Leonards (3 seats)
Party	Candidate	Votes	%	±%
Conservative	Mike Dyer	3,386		
Conservative	Ray Bryan	3,292		
Conservative	Barry Goringe	3,088		
UKIP	Tony Connor	1,562		
UKIP	Oliver Kent	1,413		
UKIP	Alistair Somerville-Ford	1,203		
Turnout		13,944	74.6	

Stour
Party	Candidate	Votes	%	±%
Conservative	Robin Cook	944	60.8	
Independent	Simon Pritchard	608	39.2	
Majority		336	21.6	
Turnout		1,552	70.4	

Verwood East (2 seats)
Party	Candidate	Votes	%	±%
Conservative	Simon Gibson	unopposed		
Conservative	Boyd Mortimer	unopposed		

Verwood West (2 seats)
Party	Candidate	Votes	%	±%
Independent	Toni Coombs	unopposed		
Independent	Spencer Flower	unopposed		

West Moors and Holt (3 seats)
Party	Candidate	Votes	%	±%
Conservative	Alexander Clarke	2,736		
Conservative	David Shortell	2,351		
Conservative	Andy Skeats	2,313		
UKIP	Bob Blake	1,267		
Independent	Peter Holden	1,157		
UKIP	Linda Hills	1,136		
UKIP	Peter Hills	1,005		
Green	Mike Hawkes	637		
Labour	Brian Cropper	610		
Turnout		13,212	73.3	

Wimborne Minster (2 seats)
Party	Candidate	Votes	%	±%
Liberal Democrats	Shane Bartlett	1,155		
Liberal Democrats	David Morgan	1,110		
Conservative	Kelly Webb	1,096		
Conservative	Sally Elliot	906		
Green	Susan Durant	482		
UKIP	Nick Wellstead	473		
UKIP	Stuart Evans	437		
Independent	Shirley Mear	204		
Independent	Edward Beardsley	192		
Turnout		6,055	68.1	

== By-elections between 2015 and 2019 ==
=== Alderholt ===
Alderholt by-election 3 March 2016
Party	Candidate	Votes	%	±%
Conservative	Gina Logan	384	47.5	
Liberal Democrats	David Tooke	376	46.5	
Labour	Christopher Archibold	49	6.1	
Majority		8	1.0	
Turnout		809	33.3	
Conservative hold		Swing		

=== Parley ===
Parley by-election 1 September 2016
Party	Candidate	Votes	%	±%
Conservative	Andrew Parry	631	54.3	
UKIP	Lawrence Wilson	396	34.1	
Liberal Democrats	Jason Jones	84	7.2	
Labour	Brian Cropper	52	4.5	
Majority		235	20.2	
Turnout		1163	24.3	
Conservative hold		Swing		

=== Verwood East ===
Verwood East by-election 12 July 2018
Party	Candidate	Votes	%	±%
Conservative	Colin Beck	706	75.1	
Labour	Sandra Turner	234	24.9	
Majority		472	50.2	
Turnout		940	20.4	
Conservative hold		Swing		

=== Ferndown Central ===
Ferndown Central by-election 25 October 2018
Party	Candidate	Votes	%	±%
Conservative	Mike Parkes	899	59.9	+3.9
Liberal Democrats	Matthew Coussell	355	23.7	+23.7
UKIP	Lawrence Wilson	246	16.4	−11.9
Majority		544	36.3	
Turnout		1,500		
Conservative hold		Swing		
