= Breamore railway station =

Disused railway station in England

Coordinates: 50.95851°N 1.77356°W

Breamore
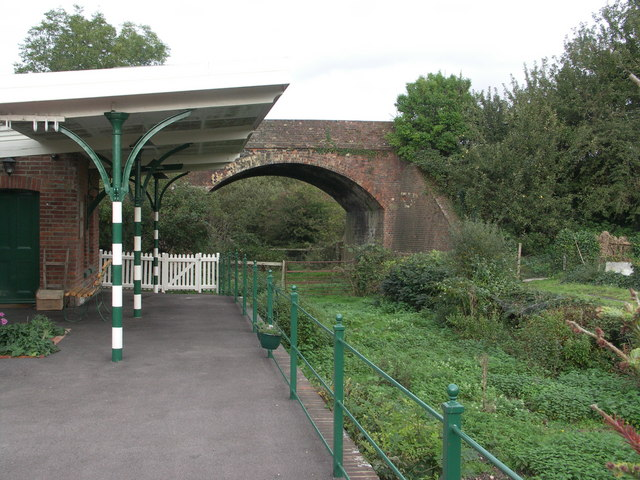
- Former station platform

General information
- Location: Breamore, New Forest; England
- Grid reference: SU160177
- Platforms: 2

Other information
- Status: Disused

History
- Pre-grouping: Salisbury and Dorset Junction Railway; London and South Western Railway
- Post-grouping: Southern Railway; Southern Region of British Railways

Key dates
- 20 December 1866: Opened
- 4 May 1964: Closed
Location

Breamore railway station was a railway station in the Avon Valley at the village of Breamore, Hampshire, England. The station was built for the Salisbury and Dorset Junction Railway and opened in 1866. It was served by trains between Salisbury in Wiltshire and West Moors in Hampshire. British Railways closed the station and the line after the last train on 2 May 1964.

The station has survived intact, and in recent years has been refurbished, it is now owned by Select Country Inns and is part of the Railway Hotel Fordingbridge. Five affordable homes were built for the Hampshire Alliance for Rural Affordable Housing (HARAH) on one of the disused platforms, being completed in December 2012.

A 2-mile section of the disused railway line which passes through the station has been converted into a footpath

Preceding station	Disused railways	Following station
Downton	British Rail; Southern Region; Salisbury and Dorset Junction Railway	Fordingbridge
