= Downton railway station =

Disused railway station in Wiltshire, England

Downton
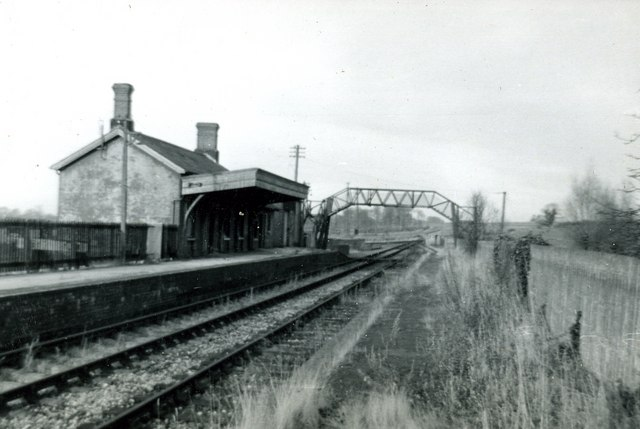

General information
- Location: Downton, Wiltshire; England
- Coordinates: 50.993011°N 1.739147°W
- Grid reference: SU1840421545
- Platforms: 2

Other information
- Status: Disused

History
- Pre-grouping: Salisbury & Dorset Junction Railway; London and South Western Railway
- Post-grouping: Southern Railway; Southern Region of British Railways

Key dates
- 20 December 1866: Opened
- 4 May 1964: Closed
Location

Downton was a railway station serving Downton, a village in Wiltshire. The village contained a large tanning mill on the River Avon, which has now closed, and has been redeveloped as residential property. The station was one of many casualties of the mass closure of British railway lines in the 1960s and 1970s; the last service was on 2 May 1964. It was served by the Salisbury and Dorset Junction Railway, a line running north–south, along the River Avon just to the West of the New Forest, connecting Salisbury to the North and Poole to the South, meeting the Southampton and Dorchester Railway at West Moors.

Today, the site of the station is a residential estate.

Preceding station	Disused railways	Following station
Salisbury	British Rail; Southern Region; Salisbury and Dorset Junction Railway	Breamore
