= List of churches in East Dorset =

East Dorset in Dorset, South West England.

The following is a list of churches in East Dorset.

== List ==
- Longham United Reformed Church
- St Kenelm's Church, Stanbridge
- St Mary's Church, Ferndown
- Wimborne Minster
- United Church Ferndown
