= St Leonard's Hospital =

St Leonard's Hospital may refer to:

- St Leonard's Hospital, Ferndown, a community hospital in Dorset
- St Leonard's Hospital, Hackney, a former hospital in London, built in 1913
- St Leonard's Hospital, Tickhill, a former monastic building in South Yorkshire, built in 1470
- St Leonard's Hospital, York, ruined building in North Yorkshire
