= Verwood railway station =

Disused railway station in Dorset, England

Coordinates: 50.8829°N 1.8913°W

Verwood
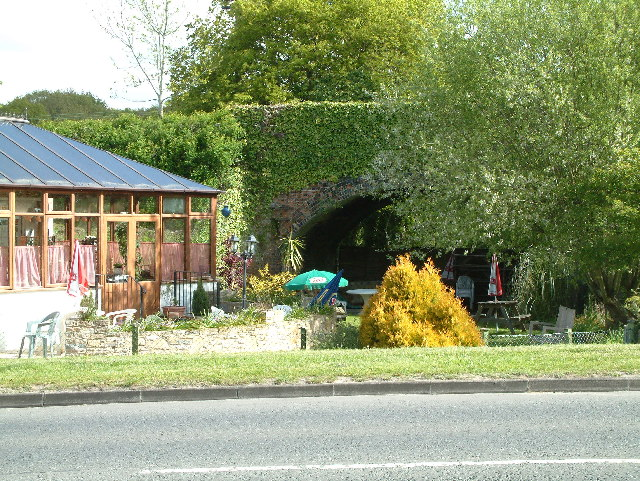
- Current site of the railway station

General information
- Location: Verwood, Dorset; England
- Grid reference: SU077093
- Platforms: 2

Other information
- Status: Disused

History
- Original company: Salisbury and Dorset Junction Railway
- Pre-grouping: London and South Western Railway
- Post-grouping: Southern Railway; Southern Region of British Railways

Key dates
- 20 December 1866: Opened
- 4 May 1964: Closed
Location

Verwood railway station served the town of Verwood, Dorset, England from 1866 to 1964.

== History ==
The station was served by the Salisbury and Dorset Junction Railway, a line running north–south, along the River Avon just to the west of the New Forest, connecting Salisbury to the north and Wimborne to the south, meeting the Southampton and Dorchester Railway at West Moors. Unusually, the station had an inn situated in the station yard.

== Timeline ==
In 1844 the Southampton & Dorchester Railway Company was formed to build a line between the two towns. The route chosen snaked (Castleman's Snake) across the New Forest from Northam to Ringwood, then via Wimborne to Hamworthy (the junction for Poole) before heading on west to Dorchester.

Because of the twists and turns the line was nicknamed 'Castleman's Corkscrew' after Charles Castleman, the Wimborne solicitor who was chiefly responsible for the building of the line. This railway was opened on 1 June 1847.

On 22 July 1861 Parliament granted the independent Salisbury & Dorset Junction Railway an act to link Salisbury with what was by then the London and South Western Railway's Southampton & Dorchester line at West Moors.

3 February 1864 saw building start at Downton. A ceremony was held with the Countess Nelson, who was married to Horatio Nelson, turning the first sod. She lived in Downton and was the daughter of the 2nd Earl of Normanton.

On 20 December 1866, 19 miles of single track line was opened from Alderbury Junction (between Salisbury and Dean) to West Moors (although there was no station there at first), forming a link between Wimborne and Salisbury and passing through Downton, Breamore, Fordingbridge, Alderholt and Verwood. The track followed the River Avon along the New Forest's western edge.

The bypassing of Cranborne reduced its importance and caused the expansion of Verwood which until then had been a minor hamlet known as Fairwood.

It was a single track line, originally with five, and later four, passing loops; one of these was at Verwood Station. At times of light traffic, the signal box at Verwood would be closed, and all trains would use the main platform on the western ('up') side.

The Albion Inn with its attached stables was unusually built in the station yard, and can still be seen to the north side of the B3081 road, which was re-routed after closure of the line to avoid the railway bridge, and which now passes through the site of the demolished station and station master's house.

The station buildings included a platform canopy on the up line along with the signal box, whereas the down platform only had a small shelter. There were few changes during its lifetime and the lighting was by oil lamps until closure in 1964.

A number of girls used to travel by train to school in Parkstone Grammar School and they still meet regularly today in the "Verwood Heathland Heritage Centre"; they are known as the train girls. The boys went to Wimborne Grammar School. The railway also enabled Verwoodians to go shopping in Poole.

The adjoining goods yard with cattle pens, a crane and a coal depot encouraged local trade and industry which included the export of sand, bricks, timber and other goods. Unfortunately it also encouraged imports of household "enamel ware" which led to the gradual cessation of the pottery industry. The last pottery, which closed in 1954, was the Crossroads Pottery—now the Verwood Heathland Heritage Centre.

As Bournemouth increased in population, and with motor transport available, many farmers in Woodlands and Verwood found it more profitable to send their milk to Bournemouth. Many other farmers took their milk to Verwood railway station around 6 p.m. to be sent to London.

Verwood was the nearest station to the large houses of many "important" people, meaning that figures such King Edward VIII, Queen Alexandra, King George VI and Queen Elizabeth II used the station.

On 1 January 1923 the Salisbury and Dorset Junction Railway came under the ownership of the Southern Railway, one of the 'Big Four' companies created under the Railways Act 1921.

During World War II, much traffic passed through Verwood as the line was a useful secondary route between the industrial north and midlands and the naval and military establishments in Dorset.

Nationalisation under the Transport Act 1947 brought Verwood Railway Station under the control of the Southern Region of British Railways.

In March 1963 Dr Beeching's report on the future of British Railways proposed Verwood for total closure along with the rest of the Salisbury & Dorset Junction line and other lines north of Bournemouth. In the autumn, a public hearing was held into the proposal, but very few objections were made. Apart from in the holiday season, traffic on the line was always light and closure had been discussed prior to the Beeching Axe.

Verwood Station closed on 4 May 1964, with the closure being received with much expression of regret in the area. All the last trains, which ran on Saturday 2 May, were full.

The lines were taken up in 1965 and the buildings dismantled so that dilapidation soon set in. Few traces of the former route can be seen other than some embankments and bridges like the one in the Albion Inn garden.

== The station site today ==
The hotel named 'The Albion Hotel' was later renamed 'The Albion Inn', due to the loss of hotel facilities.

Today, the station site is the beer garden of 'The Albion Inn'. The site where the station ticket office, tracks, and platforms were is now a road, with a housing estate built on the old goods yard.
