= 2011 East Dorset District Council election =

2011 UK local government election

Map of the results of the 2011 East Dorset District Council election. Conservatives in blue and Liberal Democrats in yellow.

The 2011 East Dorset District Council election took place on 5 May 2011 to elect members of East Dorset District Council in Dorset, England. The whole council was up for election and the Conservative Party stayed in overall control of the council.

== Background ==
Before the election the Conservatives had a majority on the council with 25 seats, compared to 11 Liberal Democrats. Every seat was up for election, however 12 Conservative councillors, including the leader of the council Spencer Flower, faced no opposition at the election. The candidates at the election were 36 Conservatives, 18 Liberal Democrats, 10 UK Independence Party and 3 from Labour.

== Election result ==
The Conservatives gained 5 seats from the Liberal Democrats to have 30 councillors, compared to 6 for the Liberal Democrats. Conservative gains including taking seats in West Moors and Corfe Mullen from the Liberal Democrats, with the margin in Corfe Mullen South ward being only 6 votes. Overall turnout at the election was 49.1%.

East Dorset local election result 2011
Party	Seats	Gains	Losses	Net gain/loss	Seats %	Votes %	Votes	+/−
Conservative	30	5	0	+5	83.3	60.8	23,205	-1.2%
Liberal Democrats	6	0	5	-5	16.7	29.2	11,161	-3.6%
UKIP	0	0	0	0	0	7.3	2,803	+3.2%
Labour	0	0	0	0	0	2.7	1,027	+2.0%

== Ward results ==
Alderholt
Party	Candidate	Votes	%	±%
Conservative	Ian Monks	unopposed		
Conservative hold		Swing		

Ameysford
Party	Candidate	Votes	%	±%
Conservative	Pauline Reynolds	703	74.4	−5.0
Liberal Democrats	Roger Hemsley	242	25.6	+5.0
Majority		461	48.8	−10.0
Turnout		945	48.0	+8.4
Conservative hold		Swing		

Colehill East (2 seats)
Party	Candidate	Votes	%	±%
Liberal Democrats	Janet Dover	1,066		
Liberal Democrats	Donald Wallace	765		
Conservative	David Mitchell	668		
Conservative	Kevin Johnson	667		
Labour	Oliver Bradbury	200		
UKIP	Kenneth Dacombe	175		
Turnout		3,541	52.2	+8.4
Liberal Democrats hold		Swing		
Liberal Democrats hold		Swing		

Colehill West
Party	Candidate	Votes	%	±%
Conservative	David Packer	729	66.0	+8.0
Liberal Democrats	Linda Dickins	375	34.0	−0.7
Majority		354	32.1	+7.8
Turnout		1,104	58.9	+11.2
Conservative hold		Swing		

Corfe Mullen Central (2 seats)
Party	Candidate	Votes	%	±%
Liberal Democrats	John Holland	813		
Conservative	Sarah Burns	759		
Liberal Democrats	Phillip Cuckston	735		
Conservative	Zoe White	667		
UKIP	Dave Evans	299		
Turnout		3,273	45.8	+5.0
Liberal Democrats hold		Swing		
Conservative gain from Liberal Democrats		Swing		

Corfe Mullen North
Party	Candidate	Votes	%	±%
Liberal Democrats	Anne Holland	540	59.3	−2.3
Conservative	Graeme Smith	371	40.7	+12.2
Majority		169	18.6	−14.4
Turnout		911	48.9	+8.4
Liberal Democrats hold		Swing		

Corfe Mullen South
Party	Candidate	Votes	%	±%
Conservative	Patrick Edwards	418	43.5	+0.0
Liberal Democrats	Philip Harknett	412	42.8	−13.7
UKIP	Josephine Evans	132	13.7	+13.7
Majority		6	0.7	
Turnout		962	46.7	+5.2
Conservative gain from Liberal Democrats		Swing		

Crane
Party	Candidate	Votes	%	±%
Conservative	Stephen Butler	unopposed		
Conservative hold		Swing		

Ferndown Central (2 seats)
Party	Candidate	Votes	%	±%
Conservative	Derek Burt	unopposed		
Conservative	Steven Lugg	unopposed		
Conservative hold		Swing		
Conservative hold		Swing		

Ferndown Links (2 seats)
Party	Candidate	Votes	%	±%
Conservative	Malcolm Birr	unopposed		
Conservative	John Little	unopposed		
Conservative hold		Swing		
Conservative hold		Swing		

Handley Vale
Party	Candidate	Votes	%	±%
Conservative	Simon Tong	unopposed		
Conservative hold		Swing		

Holt
Party	Candidate	Votes	%	±%
Conservative	Spencer Flower	unopposed		
Conservative hold		Swing		

Longham
Party	Candidate	Votes	%	±%
Conservative	Gladys Elliot	606	68.4	+2.5
UKIP	John Baxter	280	31.6	+14.8
Majority		326	36.8	−11.8
Turnout		886	46.5	+6.7
Conservative hold		Swing		

Parley (2 seats)
Party	Candidate	Votes	%	±%
Conservative	Barbara Manuel	1,482		
Conservative	John Wilson	1,430		
Liberal Democrats	Matthew Coussell	487		
Turnout		3,399	52.9	+12.3
Conservative hold		Swing		
Conservative hold		Swing		

St Leonards & St Ives East (2 seats)
Party	Candidate	Votes	%	±%
Conservative	Michael Dyer	1,520		
Conservative	Ann Warman	1,501		
UKIP	Oliver Kent	371		
UKIP	Allan Tallett	321		
Turnout		3,713	51.6	+7.6
Conservative hold		Swing		
Conservative hold		Swing		

St Leonards & St Ives West
Party	Candidate	Votes	%	±%
Conservative	Raymond Dudman	1,022	81.4	−4.3
UKIP	Alfred Eckel	233	18.6	+4.3
Majority		789	62.9	−8.5
Turnout		1,255	61.7	+9.7
Conservative hold		Swing		

Stapehill
Party	Candidate	Votes	%	±%
Conservative	George Russell	688	72.9	−1.0
Liberal Democrats	Timothy Chant	132	14.0	−0.9
UKIP	John Myers	124	13.1	+1.9
Majority		556	58.9	−0.1
Turnout		944	48.6	+3.1
Conservative hold		Swing		

Stour
Party	Candidate	Votes	%	±%
Conservative	Paul Bennett	678	73.3	+5.2
Liberal Democrats	William Honeyman	247	26.7	−5.2
Majority		431	46.6	+10.4
Turnout		925	47.0	+7.3
Conservative hold		Swing		

Three Cross & Potterne
Party	Candidate	Votes	%	±%
Conservative	Peter Richardson	451	67.4	+21.4
Liberal Democrats	Lindsey Dedden	218	32.6	+18.7
Majority		233	34.8	+15.0
Turnout		669	37.7	+4.1
Conservative hold		Swing		

Verwood Dewlands (2 seats)
Party	Candidate	Votes	%	±%
Conservative	Toni Coombs	unopposed		
Conservative	Jean Hazel	unopposed		
Conservative hold		Swing		
Conservative hold		Swing		

Verwood Newtown
Party	Candidate	Votes	%	±%
Conservative	Boyden Mortimer	531	69.2	+6.3
Liberal Democrats	Alan Dorey	236	30.8	−6.3
Majority		295	38.5	+12.7
Turnout		767	39.5	+7.7
Conservative hold		Swing		

Verwood Stephen's Castle (2 seats)
Party	Candidate	Votes	%	±%
Conservative	Lucy Clark	unopposed		
Conservative	Simon Gibson	unopposed		
Conservative hold		Swing		
Conservative hold		Swing		

West Moors (3 seats)
Party	Candidate	Votes	%	±%
Conservative	Alexander Clarke	1,923		
Conservative	David Shortell	1,781		
Conservative	Andrew Skeats	1,607		
Liberal Democrats	Peter Holden	986		
Liberal Democrats	Nicholas Smith	751		
UKIP	David Butt	540		
Labour	Michael Shine	470		
Turnout		8,058	50.4	+5.3
Conservative hold		Swing		
Conservative gain from Liberal Democrats		Swing		
Conservative gain from Liberal Democrats		Swing		

Wimborne Minster (3 seats)
Party	Candidate	Votes	%	±%
Liberal Democrats	Patricia Hymers	1,220		
Conservative	Robin Cook	1,169		
Liberal Democrats	David Morgan	993		
Conservative	Michael Bartlett	973		
Liberal Democrats	Shane Bartlett	943		
Conservative	Alan Spencer	861		
Labour	Marion Lock	357		
UKIP	Nicholas Wellstead	328		
Turnout		6,844	49.1	+7.5
Liberal Democrats hold		Swing		
Conservative gain from Liberal Democrats		Swing		
Liberal Democrats hold		Swing		

== By-elections between 2011 and 2015 ==
A by-election was held in Colehill East ward on 17 July 2014 after the death of the Liberal Democrat councillor since 1973, Don Wallace. The seat was held for the Liberal Democrats by Barry Roberts with a majority of 416 votes over the Conservatives.

Colehill East by-election 17 July 2014
Party	Candidate	Votes	%	±%
Liberal Democrats	Barry Roberts	742	59.3	+8.7
Conservative	Graeme Smith	326	26.0	−5.6
UKIP	David Mattocks	184	14.7	+6.4
Majority		416	33.3	
Turnout		1,252	33.7	−18.5
Liberal Democrats hold		Swing		
