= West Moors railway station =

Disused railway station in Dorset, England

West Moors

General information
- Location: West Moors, Dorset; England
- Coordinates: 50.82648°N 1.88779°W
- Grid reference: SU080030
- Platforms: 2

Other information
- Status: Disused

History
- Pre-grouping: London and South Western Railway
- Post-grouping: Southern Railway; Southern Region of British Railways

Key dates
- 1 August 1867: Opened
- 4 May 1964: Closed to passengers
- 1974: Closed completely
Location

West Moors was a railway station in Dorset, England, lying between Wimborne Minster and Ringwood.

The station was opened in 1867, to provide a junction on the Southampton and Dorchester Railway (by then amalgamated with the LSWR) with the recently completed Salisbury and Dorset Junction Railway.

Although passenger services were withdrawn in 1964 as a result of the Beeching Report, the line remained open until 1974 for freight trains serving the Royal Army Ordnance Corps fuel depot at West Moors. The track was lifted in 1974, and the station site is now a housing estate.

Preceding station	Disused railways	Following station
Verwood; Line and station closed	British Rail; Southern Region; Salisbury and Dorset Junction Railway	Wimborne; Line and station closed
Ashley Heath; Line and station closed	British Rail; Southern Region; Southampton and Dorchester Railway	Wimborne; Line and station closed

== See also ==
- List of closed railway stations in Great Britain
