= 2007 East Dorset District Council election =

2007 UK local government election

Map of the results of the 2007 East Dorset District Council election. Conservatives in blue and Liberal Democrats in yellow.

The 2007 East Dorset District Council election took place on 3 May 2007 to elect members of East Dorset District Council in Dorset, England. The whole council was up for election and the Conservative Party stayed in overall control of the council after a net gain of one seat.

== Election result ==
East Dorset local election result 2007
Party	Seats	Gains	Losses	Net gain/loss	Seats %	Votes %	Votes	+/−
Conservative	25	3	2	+1	69.4	62.0	30,092	+2.1%
Liberal Democrats	11	2	2	0	30.6	32.8	15,901	-3.3%
UKIP	0	0	0	0	0	4.1	2,003	+3.6%
Labour	0	0	0	0	0	0.7	334	-1.0%
Independent	0	0	1	-1	0	0.3	168	-0.8%

== Ward results ==
Alderholt
Party	Candidate	Votes	%	±%
Conservative	David Cozier	581	65.6	−10.2
Liberal Democrats	David Tooke	242	27.3	+3.1
UKIP	Annette Hurst	63	7.1	+7.1
Majority		339	38.3	−13.3
Turnout		886	39.5	+7.3
Conservative hold		Swing		

Ameysford
Party	Candidate	Votes	%	±%
Conservative	Pauline Reynolds	651	79.4	+5.8
Liberal Democrats	Valery Kitson	169	20.6	−5.8
Majority		482	58.8	+11.5
Turnout		820	39.6	+7.0
Conservative hold		Swing		

Colehill East (2 seats)
Party	Candidate	Votes	%	±%
Liberal Democrats	Janet Dover	933		
Liberal Democrats	Don Wallace	805		
Conservative	K Johnson	486		
Conservative	Peter Finney	447		
UKIP	John Myers	210		
UKIP	Ken Dacombe	205		
Labour	Judy Eeles	83		
Turnout		3,169	43.8	+7.0
Liberal Democrats hold		Swing		
Liberal Democrats hold		Swing		

Colehill West
Party	Candidate	Votes	%	±%
Conservative	David Packer	540	58.0	−0.4
Liberal Democrats	Mike Spencer-Smith	323	34.7	−6.9
UKIP	Alan Haines	68	7.3	+7.3
Majority		217	23.3	+6.5
Turnout		931	47.7	+7.2
Conservative hold		Swing		

Corfe Mullen Central (2 seats)
Party	Candidate	Votes	%	±%
Liberal Democrats	Paul Holland	920		
Liberal Democrats	Philip Cuckston	837		
Conservative	Peter Haward	561		
Conservative	Basil Pitt	455		
UKIP	Dave Evans	219		
UKIP	Josephine Evans	188		
Turnout		3,180	40.8	+12.0
Liberal Democrats hold		Swing		
Liberal Democrats hold		Swing		

Corfe Mullen North
Party	Candidate	Votes	%	±%
Liberal Democrats	Anne Holland	479	61.6	−9.7
Conservative	Andrew Russell	222	28.5	−0.3
UKIP	David Maloney	77	9.9	+9.9
Majority		257	33.0	−9.5
Turnout		778	40.5	+7.7
Liberal Democrats hold		Swing		

Corfe Mullen South
Party	Candidate	Votes	%	±%
Liberal Democrats	Stewart Hearn	484	56.5	−6.8
Conservative	Ivan Harrington	373	43.5	+6.8
Majority		111	13.0	−13.5
Turnout		857	41.5	+6.4
Liberal Democrats hold		Swing		

Crane
Party	Candidate	Votes	%	±%
Conservative	Tim Palmer	464	60.5	−13.5
Liberal Democrats	James Hankins	303	39.5	+13.5
Majority		161	21.0	−26.9
Turnout		767	44.2	+5.6
Conservative hold		Swing		

Ferndown Central (2 seats)
Party	Candidate	Votes	%	±%
Conservative	Queenie Comfort	1,248		
Conservative	Derek Burt	1,127		
Liberal Democrats	Robin Barsby	358		
Turnout		2,733	41.9	+4.4
Conservative hold		Swing		
Conservative hold		Swing		

Ferndown Links (2 seats)
Party	Candidate	Votes	%	±%
Conservative	John Little	1,084		
Conservative	Malcolm Birr	1,063		
Liberal Democrats	Margaret Martin	388		
Turnout		2,535	36.5	+7.0
Conservative hold		Swing		
Conservative hold		Swing		

Handley Vale
Party	Candidate	Votes	%	±%
Conservative	Simon Tong	682	62.5	+20.0
Liberal Democrats	Pauline Bailey-Wright	410	37.5	−20.0
Majority		272	24.9	
Turnout		1,092	54.0	+17.5
Conservative gain from Liberal Democrats		Swing		

Holt
Party	Candidate	Votes	%	±%
Conservative	Spencer Flower	699	79.8	+5.5
Liberal Democrats	Henry Bartlett	177	20.2	−5.5
Majority		522	59.6	+11.0
Turnout		876	46.0	+5.3
Conservative hold		Swing		

Longham
Party	Candidate	Votes	%	±%
Conservative	Sally Elliot	511	65.9	+6.9
Liberal Democrats	Patricia Irvine	134	17.3	−23.7
UKIP	John Baxter	130	16.8	+16.8
Majority		377	48.6	+30.7
Turnout		775	39.8	+5.9
Conservative hold		Swing		

Parley (2 seats)
Party	Candidate	Votes	%	±%
Conservative	Ronald Daw	1,298		
Conservative	Barbara Manuel	1,269		
Labour	Christopher Hampton	251		
Turnout		2,818	40.6	+8.2
Conservative hold		Swing		
Conservative hold		Swing		

St Leonards & St Ives East (2 seats)
Party	Candidate	Votes	%	±%
Conservative	Ann Warman	1,347		
Conservative	Michael Dyer	1,277		
UKIP	Mike Eckel	239		
Liberal Democrats	Adrian Wilson	230		
UKIP	Allan Tallett	183		
Turnout		3,276	44.0	+5.6
Conservative hold		Swing		
Conservative hold		Swing		

St Leonards & St Ives West
Party	Candidate	Votes	%	±%
Conservative	Raymond Dudman	924	85.7	+3.8
Liberal Democrats	John Irvine	154	14.3	−3.8
Majority		770	71.4	+7.7
Turnout		1,078	52.0	+5.0
Conservative hold		Swing		

Stapehill
Party	Candidate	Votes	%	±%
Conservative	George Russell	649	73.9	−7.0
Liberal Democrats	Philip Harknett	131	14.9	−4.2
UKIP	David Baxter	98	11.2	+11.2
Majority		518	59.0	−2.7
Turnout		878	45.5	+10.9
Conservative hold		Swing		

Stour
Party	Candidate	Votes	%	±%
Conservative	Paul Bennett	544	68.1	+24.7
Liberal Democrats	Tim Chant	255	31.9	−24.7
Majority		289	36.2	
Turnout		799	39.7	+9.2
Conservative gain from Liberal Democrats		Swing		

Three Cross & Potterne
Party	Candidate	Votes	%	±%
Conservative	Peter Richardson	295	46.0	+46.0
Independent	Victor Redpath	168	26.2	−31.7
UKIP	Jeremy Andrews	90	14.0	+14.0
Liberal Democrats	Diana Baker	89	13.9	−28.2
Majority		127	19.8	
Turnout		642	33.6	+10.9
Conservative gain from Independent		Swing		

Verwood Dewlands (2 seats)
Party	Candidate	Votes	%	±%
Conservative	Toni Coombs	1,058		
Conservative	Jean Hazel	999		
Liberal Democrats	Peter Baker	524		
Turnout		2,581	39.5	+5.5
Conservative hold		Swing		
Conservative hold		Swing		

Verwood Newtown
Party	Candidate	Votes	%	±%
Conservative	Boyd Mortimer	405	62.9	+9.1
Liberal Democrats	Lindsey Dedden	239	37.1	−0.7
Majority		166	25.8	+9.8
Turnout		644	31.8	−4.0
Conservative hold		Swing		

Verwood Stephen's Castle (2 seats)
Party	Candidate	Votes	%	±%
Conservative	Lucy Clark	1,029		
Conservative	Michael Simper	976		
Liberal Democrats	Michael Daymond	514		
Liberal Democrats	Alan Dedden	436		
Turnout		2,955	39.9	−0.2
Conservative hold		Swing		
Conservative hold		Swing		

West Moors (3 seats)
Party	Candidate	Votes	%	±%
Liberal Democrats	Pete Holden	1,501		
Conservative	Alexander Clarke	1,429		
Liberal Democrats	Nick Smith	1,409		
Conservative	David Durley	1,389		
Conservative	Andy Skeats	1,242		
Turnout		6,970	45.1	+11.1
Liberal Democrats gain from Conservative		Swing		
Conservative hold		Swing		
Liberal Democrats gain from Conservative		Swing		

Wimborne Minster (3 seats)
Party	Candidate	Votes	%	±%
Liberal Democrats	Pat Hymers	1,300		
Liberal Democrats	David Morgan	1,110		
Liberal Democrats	Marilyn Osner	1,047		
Conservative	Robin Cook	1,042		
Conservative	Richard Booth	899		
Conservative	Michael Hodkinson	827		
UKIP	Jeff Markley	233		
Turnout		6,458	41.6	+5.8
Liberal Democrats hold		Swing		
Liberal Democrats hold		Swing		
Liberal Democrats hold		Swing		

== By-elections between 2007 and 2011 ==
=== Alderholt ===
Alderholt By-Election 23 October 2008
Party	Candidate	Votes	%	±%
Conservative	Ian Monks	499	53.0	−12.5
Liberal Democrats	David Tooke	442	47.0	+19.7
Majority		57	6.0	−32.3
Turnout		941	41.8	+2.3
Conservative hold		Swing		

=== Ferndown Central ===
A by-election was held in Ferndown Central after the resignation of Conservative councillor Queenie Comfort. The seat was held for the Conservatives by Lesley Dedman with a majority of 33 over independent Jason Lawford.

Ferndown Central By-Election 2 July 2009
Party	Candidate	Votes	%	±%
Conservative	Lesley Dedman	510	51.7	−26.0
Independent	Jason Lawford	477	48.3	+48.3
Majority		33	3.4	
Turnout		987	26.4	−15.5
Conservative hold		Swing		

=== Corfe Mullen South ===
A by-election was held in Corfe Mullen South after Liberal Democrat councillor Stewart Hearn resigned from the council. The seat was held for the Liberal Democrats by Philip Harknet with a majority of 128.

Corfe Mullen South By-Election 15 July 2010
Party	Candidate	Votes	%	±%
Liberal Democrats	Philip Harknet	478	55.5	−1.0
Conservative		350	40.6	−2.9
UKIP		34	3.9	+3.9
Majority		128	14.8	+1.8
Turnout		862	40.5	−1.0
Liberal Democrats hold		Swing		
