= Queen Elizabeth's School, Wimborne Minster =

Secondary school in England

Queen Elizabeth's School

Location
- Blandford Road; Pamphill, Wimborne Minster, Dorset, BH21 4DT; England; 50°48′20″N 2°00′13″W

Information
- Type: Academy
- Motto: Delivering Academic Excellence
- Religious affiliation: Church of England
- Established: 1497; 529 years ago
- Founder: Lady Margaret Beaufort
- Local authority: Dorset
- Department for Education URN: 141526 Tables
- Ofsted: Reports
- Head teacher: Thomas Neill
- Staff: 108
- Gender: Mixed
- Age: 13 to 18
- Enrolment: 1,477
- Houses: Lancaster, Stuart, Tudor, Wessex, York
- Colours: Blue, green, purple, red, yellow
- Website: https://www.queenelizabeths.com/

Queen Elizabeth's School (also known as QE) is a co-educational comprehensive secondary school in Wimborne Minster, Dorset, England.

== Introduction ==
QE is an upper school, taking students between the ages of 13 and 18. In November 2014 there were 1,482 pupils, including 391 in the sixth form.

It is situated to the west of Wimborne Minster alongside the National Trust's Kingston Lacy estate and serves a wide area. Students travel from as far afield as Sixpenny Handley near Salisbury to the north, Alderholt on the Hampshire border to the east and Blandford Forum to the west. However, most students live in or around Wimborne, the main feeder schools being Allenbourn Middle School, Cranborne Middle School, Emmanuel CofE Middle School and St Michael's Church of England Middle School.

QE is a Church of England school, with close links to the Minster in Wimborne.

QE has a house system of students Lancaster (red) Stuart (purple) Tudor (green) Wessex (blue) and York (yellow)

== History ==
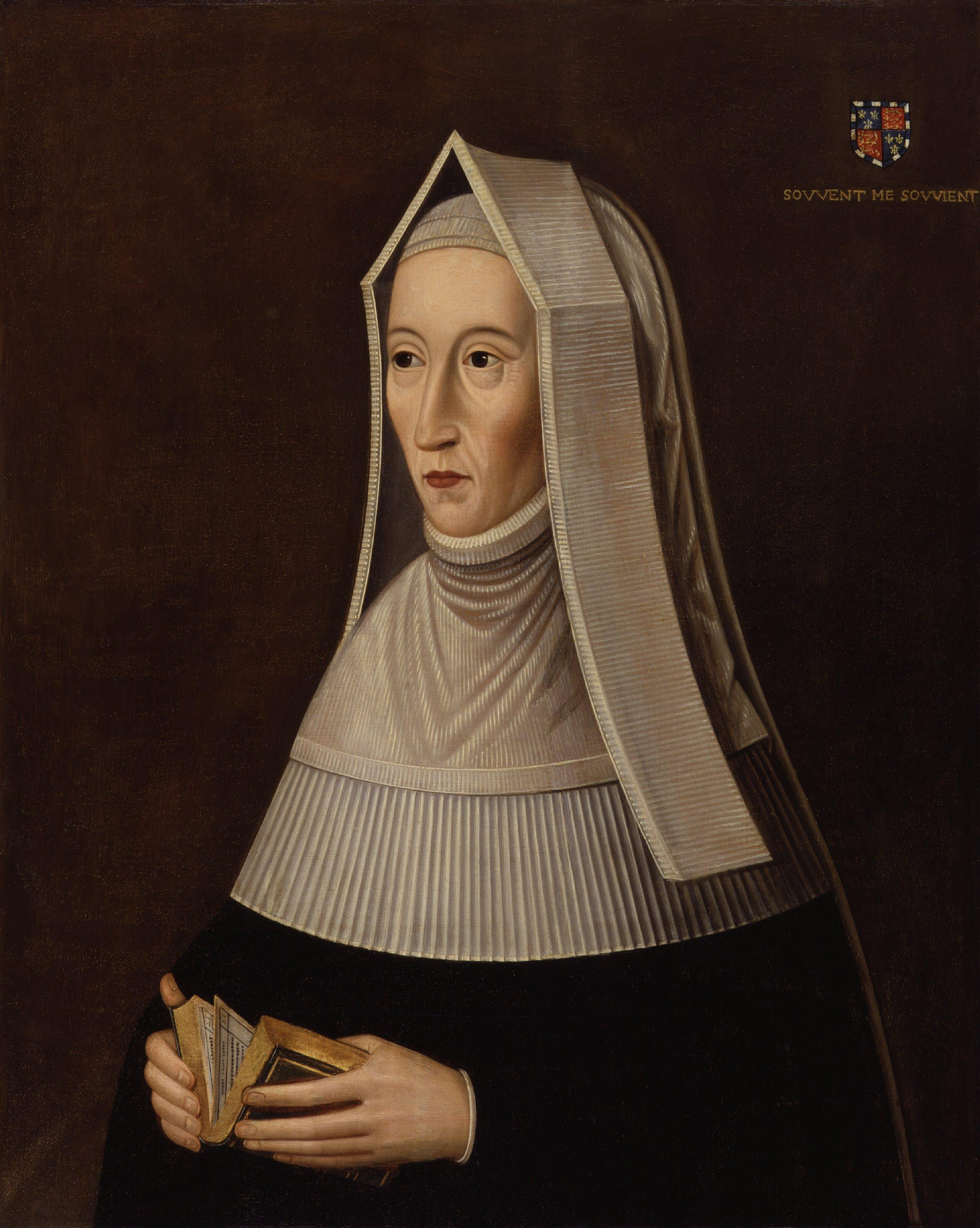
Margaret Beaufort, Countess of Richmond and Derby

Queen Elizabeth's was founded by Lady Margaret Beaufort (1443–1509), the mother of Henry VII. Her father, John Beaufort, 1st Duke of Somerset, occupied the Kingston Lacy estate in the mid-15th century and Lady Margaret was brought up there.

When John Beaufort died he was buried at Wimborne Minster and his daughter set up a chantry to say masses for his soul in perpetuity. Later, in her will, she included a provision that the chantry priest "should teach Grammar freely to all who come thereto". Tithes on properties belonging to her estate were assigned for the payment of the Grammar School's expenses.

In 1563 Queen Elizabeth I reconfirmed the provisions of Lady Margaret’s will on condition that from then on the school be known as Queen Elizabeth's Free Grammar School in Wimborne Minster.

=== Grammar to Comprehensive ===
Until Victorian times the curriculum continued to centre on Greek and Latin (varied with cockfighting in the 18th century). Student numbers were low until the beginning of the 20th century. At the first inspection by the new Education board in 1905 there were 27 boarders and 37 day boys. By 1929 there were 150 pupils; by 1939, 272; by 1960, 500.

In 1945 QE became a voluntary controlled school under the Department of Education. The first 30 girls joined in 1953.

Between 1965 and 1975 about 90% of state secondary schools in England abandoned selection and became comprehensives. As part of this sweeping change Queen Elizabeth’s Grammar School merged with Wimborne Secondary Modern and moved to the present site.

=== New buildings ===
In February 2006 it was announced that QE School would be completely rebuilt under the Building Schools for the Future (BSF) programme. Additional funding was secured by making the new building a demonstration project for sustainable schools - features included a ground-air heat exchanger system and biomass boilers.

The school was designed by architects Feilden Clegg Bradley in partnership with Mouchel, and constructed by Carillion. Students influenced the design from the start, working alongside the planners.

The new buildings went up next to the old ones and were occupied in October 2011.

=== Academy ===
On 1 November 2014 QE converted to an academy. The managing company, Queen Elizabeth’s School (Wimborne Minster), is registered in England and Wales: Company Number 8696394.

When it became an academy, the school's unique reference number (URN) changed to 141526. The old URN 113883 should be used to find historical data such as performance tables.

== See also ==
- List of the oldest schools in the United Kingdom
