= List of King George V Playing Fields in Dorset =

Dorset
Location	Formal name	Local name (if any)	National Grid Reference	Dates		External links
Location	Formal name	Local name (if any)	National Grid Reference	Purchase	Opening	External links
Bournemouth	King's Park, Boscombe	n/a	SZ117929			Dorset Echo
Ferndown	King George V Playing Field	n/a	SU070004			View looking south
Swanage	King George's Playing Fields	n/a	SZ024790			Swanage Railway History
