= The Hub (Verwood) =

Multi-purpose venue in Dorset, England

Coordinates: 50.8811°N 1.882°W

The Verwood Hub
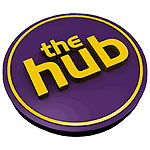
- The Hub
- Interactive map of The Verwood Hub
- Location: Verwood, Dorset, England
- Owner: Dorset Council
- Capacity: 300 (Merryfield Theatre); 260 (Classroom)

Construction
- Opened: 2007

Website
- www.dorsetcouncil.gov.uk/verwoodhub

The Hub (also known as the Verwood Hub) is a multi-purpose venue based in Verwood, Dorset, England, hosting a range of live music, theatre, art, conferences, workshops, children’s activities and other community based projects. There is also a 7.1 surround sound cinema, a state-of-the-art gym and a café.

== History ==
First mooted in the 1990s, with strong local support, the Hub was one of the biggest community projects ever delivered by East Dorset District Council (EDDC), at a cost of nearly £2.75m. The Hub opened on 12 March 2007, with management and control handed over to the volunteer Verwood Hub Community Association (later changing their name to Verwood Arts And Leisure Amenities).

The main hall was named the Merryfield Theatre after the late Buster Merryfield, a long-term resident of Verwood.

In 2013 an extension to The Hub was built to house a state-of-the-art gym to replace facilities in the old Verwood Leisure Centre which was sold to Morrisons to allow their Verwood supermarket to expand.

On 1 July 2014, with the volunteer management running into some financial difficulties, tenancy and assets reverted to EDDC.

In 2018 the Merryfield theatre cinema system was upgraded to include full cinema-quality picture and 7.1 surround sound.

Following the reorganisation of Dorset councils in 2019, responsibility for The Hub moved over to Dorset Council, and is now run as part of the East Dorset Partnership which includes Queen Elizabeth Leisure Centre in Wimborne.

== Facilities ==
The Merrifield Theatre can accommodate 304 people in raked theatre-style seating with stage, cinema screen and full sound system; or the seating can be removed to provide a conference facility or cabaret/banquet-style seating for around 240.

There are also studio rooms available seating between 20 and 100 people, a licensed bar and cafe.

The gym comprises state of the art Technogym equipment, a functional training zone, suspension training area and a weights section. Technogym equipment includes 25 cardiovascular machines, 10 resistance based machines and 6 kinesis machines. There are multiple fitness classes, ranging from classes and fitness regimes for doctor referrals to high intensity workouts.

The Hub also manages the Emmanuel Sports Hall (shared with Emmanual School) and sports pitches and the Pavilion at Potterne Park.

== Events ==
The main theatre hosts a wide variety of events, from talks (by such as England, British and Irish Lions and Northampton Saints star James Haskell), magic (featuring Britain's Got Talent's Marc Spelmann) and live music, ranging from Verwood Concert Brass, Swing Unlimited Big Band, various Tribute Bands such as Arrival - The Hits of Abba, and vocalists such as Gordon Haskell, as well as the annual Verwood Pantomime.

In 2019 The Verwood Hub began working with Live Nation and is a venue on their live stand up comedy circuit. Just before the 2020 pandemic their first comedian Geoff Norcott performed on his UK tour. Geoff Norcott plus others are looking to return in 2021/22.
