= Cripplestyle =

Hamlet in Dorset, England

Coordinates: 50.9109°N 1.8707°W

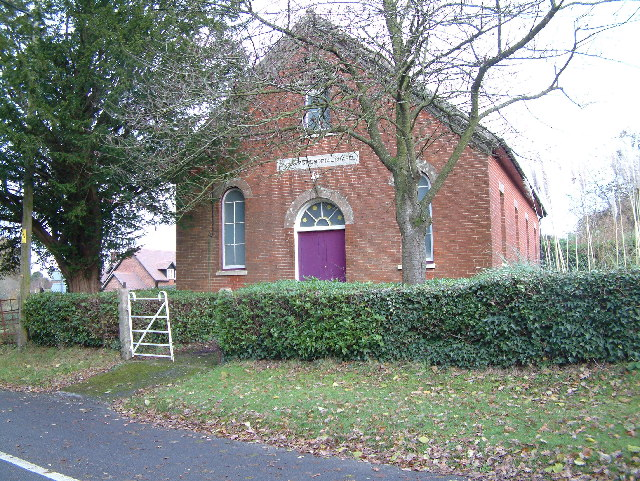
- Williams Memorial Chapel, Cripplestyle

- Location within Dorset
- OS grid reference: SU091123
- Civil parish: Alderholt
- Unitary authority: Dorset
- Ceremonial county: Dorset
- Region: South West
- Country: England
- Sovereign state: United Kingdom
- Post town: FORDINGBRIDGE
- Postcode district: SP6
- Dialling code: 01425
- Police: Dorset
- Fire: Dorset and Wiltshire
- Ambulance: South Western
- UK Parliament: North Dorset

Cripplestyle is a hamlet in the civil parish of Alderholt in the county of Dorset, England. It lies close to the Dorset-Hampshire border. The nearest town is Verwood, which lies approximately 2 miles (3.2 km) to the south.

Prior to 1894 Cripplestyle was in the parish of Cranborne.

The Ebenezer Congregational Chapel was opened in Cripplestyle on 11 December 1807. William Bailey became the first pastor in December 1808. He died in August 1838. Samuel Williams, originally from Rhymney in Monmouthshire, was the minister there for 40 years. He died in 1882. A small rectangular cob-built thatched building, originally of 'clay, heather, wood and thatch', it was extended twice, but despite efforts to preserve it, it collapsed in October 1976. There is a stone memorial at the site now. The Williams Memorial Chapel was built in 1888, in memory of Williams, and to replace the Ebenezer Chapel as a place of regular worship.

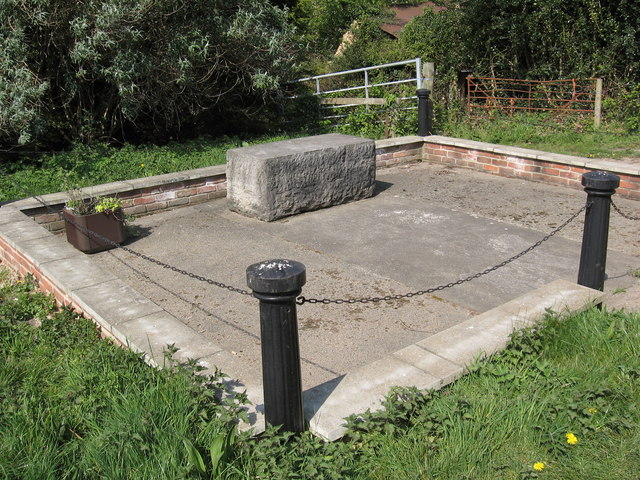
Ebenezer Chapel Memorial
