= St Leonard's Hospital, Ferndown =

St Leonard's Hospital
- Dorset HealthCare University NHS Foundation Trust
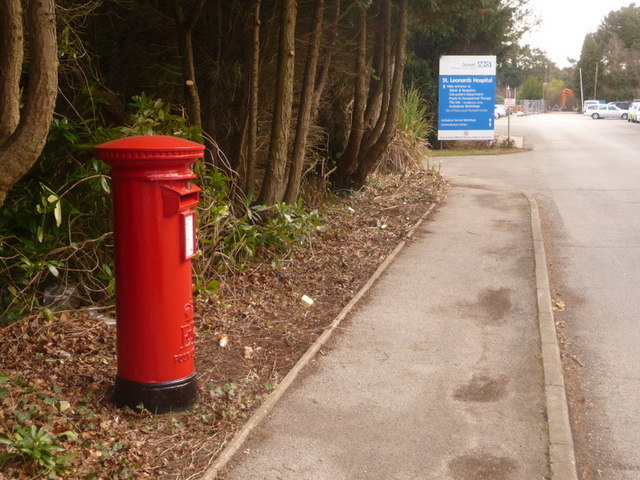
- St Leonard's Hospital

- Shown in Dorset

Geography
- Location: Ferndown, Dorset, England
- Coordinates: 50.8176°N 1.85612°W

Organisation
- Care system: NHS
- Type: Community

History
- Founded: 1942

Links
- Website: www.dorsethealthcare.nhs.uk
- Lists: Hospitals in England

St Leonard's Hospital is a health facility in Ferndown, Dorset, England. It is managed by Dorset HealthCare University NHS Foundation Trust.

== History ==
The facility was built for American and Canadian military personnel arriving at Hurn Airport and was completed in 1942 during the Second World War. At the end of the war General Dwight D. Eisenhower planted an oak tree to commemorate the event. It joined the National Health Service as a geriatric facility in 1948 and, after most of the wartime buildings were cleared away in the 1960s, a small community hospital was established on the site. In September 2018 the Fayrewood Ward was closed as services started to transfer to the Royal Bournemouth Hospital.
