= Ferndown =

Town in Dorset, England

Coordinates: 50°49′N 1°54′W

- Town and civil parish
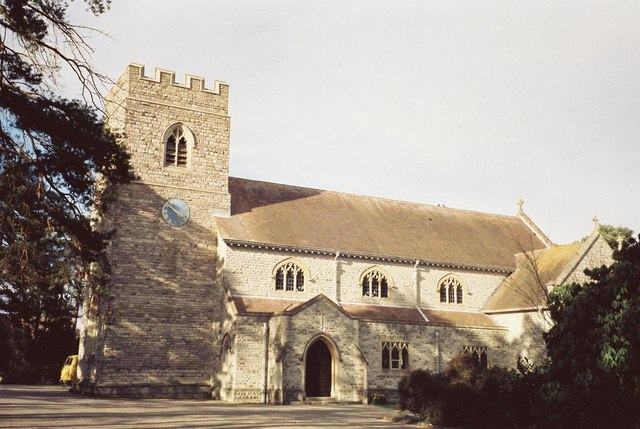
- The Parish Church of St Mary, Ferndown

- Location within Dorset
- Interactive map of Ferndown
- Population: 17,501 (parish, 2021)
- OS grid reference: SU071009
  - London: 100 mi (160 km) NE
- Civil parish: Ferndown Town
- Unitary authority: Dorset
- Ceremonial county: Dorset
- Region: South West
- Country: England
- Sovereign state: United Kingdom
- Post town: Ferndown
- Postcode district: BH21, BH22
- Dialling code: 01202
- Police: Dorset
- Fire: Dorset and Wiltshire
- Ambulance: South Western
- UK Parliament: Christchurch
- Website: Town Council

Ferndown is a town and civil parish (under the name Ferndown Town) in Dorset in southern England. It lies immediately to the north of Bournemouth and Poole, and about 4 miles (6 km) east of Wimborne Minster. The parish, which until 1986 was called Hampreston, includes the communities of Ameysford, Hampreston, Longham, Stapehill and Trickett's Cross. At the 2021 census the population of the parish was 17,501.

== History ==
Domesday Book of 1086 recorded a settlement with 25 households at Hame, in Cranborne Hundred. The other ancient settlements were at Canford and Longham, all three built on gravel terraces on the north bank of the River Stour.

The 1892 Ordnance Survey map shows Hampreston parish. Besides Hampreston hamlet – with All Saints, the 14th-century parish church – there are small groups of dwellings at Canford Bottom, Stapehill, Longham and Fern Down. In 1898, Cricket's Cross appears as the label where the road from Wimborne Minster meets the Poole–Ringwood road.

In 1913, 944 acres in the west of the parish, including Canford Bottom, were transferred to Colehill parish. Residential development at Ferndown was distant from the parish church at Hampreston, so St Mary's church was begun at Ferndown in 1933, as a replacement for smaller buildings in use since the turn of the century; the outbreak of war and lack of funds meant the church would not be completed until 1972.

Horticulture contributed to the growth of Ferndown, beginning in 1864 when the Stewart family established a nursery to grow plants in warmer conditions than at their principal site in Scotland. At first their business was concerned with landscaping tennis courts and golf courses; in 1955 they opened at Ferndown one of the first garden centres in Britain. Around that time Ferndown was "a village with gravel road and a scattering of shops", and much of the present town was built in the subsequent 20–30 years.

In 1956, when Ferndown was expanding rapidly, land in the east was transferred from West Parley to Hampreston. The name of the parish was changed from Hampreston to Ferndown Town on 1 February 1986.

Today, Stapehill and Trickett's Cross are identified on maps although they are effectively part of the Ferndown built-up area. Hampreston, Little Canford and Ameysford remain as small settlements on the edges of the parish.

== Transport ==
Ferndown lies adjacent to the A31 trunk road between Wimborne and Ringwood. To the east, the A31 connects to the M27 and M3 via the outskirts of Southampton to Winchester, and thence to Basingstoke and London or via the A34 to the M4 north of Newbury. To the west, the A31 links to the A35 to East Dorset and Devon. The nearest railway station is Branksome, 6 3/4 miles (11 kilometres) away.

The nearby port of Poole provides year-round services to Cherbourg in France and Santander in Spain. Condor Ferries catamarans run seasonal services to Guernsey, Jersey and St. Malo, Brittany.

Ferndown is 4 miles (6.5 kilometres) from Bournemouth Airport at Hurn.

Ferndown is served by four bus routes: the 13 & 13a to Wimborne and Bournemouth, the X6 to Ringwood, Verwood, Bearwood and Poole, and the 38 to Ringwood, all operated by morebus.

== Industry ==
On the outskirts of the town lie the Ferndown and Uddens Industrial Estates, forming the largest industrial area in East Dorset containing a wide range of both small and large businesses. Ferndown Industrial Estate, Uddens Trading Estate and East Dorset Trade Park cover an area of approximately 61 ha (150 acres) Many household names and major employers are present there, such as Farrow & Ball. A diverse range of industries are also represented covering business services, manufacturing, retail and many more.

== Sport and recreation ==
The King George's Field named in memoriam to King George V is a large area of open space including a children's playground with equipment for children with special needs, six tennis courts, four football pitches, a cricket pitch, a bowling green, boules area, a croquet practice lawn, a rugby pitch and a skateboard park.

There are two golf clubs: Ferndown Forest Golf Club, which offers a single 18-hole course, and Ferndown Golf Club, which offers two courses – The Old Course also known as the Championship Course, and the nine-hole Aliss Course also known as the President's Course.

Ferndown Leisure Centre, next to Ferndown Upper School, has two heated pools, a sports hall, a gymnasium, squash courts and a rifle range. The Leisure Centre facilities (as well as the surrounding field) are shared with the Upper School.

Ferndown Community Centre is one of the town's main attractions, home of the Barrington Theatre in the main shopping centre at Penny's Walk, which also includes a large Tesco supermarket and the local branch of the county library.

There are large areas of woodland and heathlands around Ferndown including Holt Heath and Slop Bog. This heathland originally covered the entire area and up until the early 1900s covered many areas that are now residential.

== Education ==
Schooling in Ferndown, as in much of Dorset, is based on a three-tier system of first, middle and upper schools. Ferndown Upper School is a co-educational comprehensive school for students aged between 13 and 19, with up to 320 pupils admitted each year from its feeder middle schools in Ferndown, West Moors and Verwood.

Ferndown Middle School (on the former Gorsemoor Middle School site) takes pupils at age 9 from Ferndown First School (on the old Ferndown Middle School site), Hampreston First School and Parley First School. The Ferndown school changes occurred in the late 1980s and early 1990s, when the original first school was demolished to make way for a small residential area named Old School Close, and former Dorset Council offices, now called Enterprise House and owned by logistics company Hoare Lea. The two middle schools combined and one became the new first school.

== Governance ==
The first tier of local government is Ferndown Town Council, made up of councillors elected from seven wards.

For Dorset Council elections, the parish is covered by two wards, Ferndown South and Ferndown North, each electing two councillors.

For Westminster elections, Ferndown is part of the Christchurch constituency.

== Media ==
Local news and television programmes are provided by BBC South and ITV Meridian. Television signals are received from Rowridge transmitting station. Local radio stations are BBC Radio Solent, Heart South, Greatest Hits Radio South, Nation Radio South Coast, Hits Radio Bournemouth & Poole, Greatest Hits Radio South and Forest FM, a community based station which broadcasts from to the town. The town is served by the local newspaper, Bournemouth Daily Echo.

== Religious sites ==
- Longham United Reformed Church
- St Mary's Church, Ferndown

== Twin town ==
Ferndown is twinned with Segré in the Maine-et-Loire département of France.

== See also ==
- List of King George V Playing Fields (Dorset)
- Ferndown Common
- St Leonard's Hospital, Ferndown
- Parley Common
- St Mary's Church, Ferndown
