= East Dorset =

Former non-metropolitan district in England

East Dorset District
- Non-metropolitan district
- Coat of arms

- East Dorset shown within Dorset
- Coordinates: 50°48′59.84″N 1°58′53.36″W
- Sovereign state: United Kingdom
- Constituent country: England
- Region: South West England
- Non-metropolitan county: Dorset
- Status: Abolished
- Admin HQ: Wimborne
- Incorporated: 1 April 1974 to 30 March 2019

Government
  - Type: Non-metropolitan district council
  - Body: East Dorset District Council
  - Leadership: Alternative - Sec.31 ( )

Area
  - Total: 136.8 sq mi (354.4 km^{2})

Population (mid-2018)
  - Total: 89,400
  - Density: 653/sq mi (252/km^{2})
  - Ethnicity: 99.0% White
- Time zone: UTC0 (GMT)
  - Summer (DST): UTC+1 (BST)
- ONS code: 19UD (ONS); E07000049 (GSS)
- OS grid reference: SU0130301959
- Website: www.dorsetforyou.gov.uk

East Dorset was a local government district in Dorset, England. Its council met in Wimborne Minster between 2016 and 2019.

The district (as Wimborne) was formed on 1 April 1974 by merging Wimborne Minster Urban District with Wimborne and Cranborne Rural District, plus the parish of St Leonards and St Ives transferred from the Ringwood and Fordingbridge Rural District in Hampshire. The district was renamed East Dorset with effect from 1 January 1988. The district was abolished in 2019 at the same time that Dorset County Council and the other districts in the county were abolished, with the area becoming part of the Dorset unitary authority on 1 April 2019.

The popularity of the area, being close to the New Forest, Bournemouth and the Dorset coast saw a rapid expansion in housing from the 1970s with the Verwood, Ferndown, West Moors and Corfe Mullen populations more than quadrupling. Rural landscape prevailed in the north and west of the area. Wimborne Minster retained its identity as a historic market town.

The most notable geography is lowland heath, managed by East Dorset Countryside Management Services in partnership with the Forestry Commission. The expansion of housing has led to a massive decrease in the area of this unusual and unique habitat, which once covered 500 km^{2} but now covers only 15% of that.

Statistics released by the Office for National Statistics show that life expectancy at birth for males in East Dorset was 80.1 years in 2001–2003, the highest in the United Kingdom. Female life expectancy at birth for the same period was 83.4 years, ranking seventh in the UK. The figures for East Dorset during 1991-1993 were 77.9 years for males and 82.5 for females.

== Governance ==
East Dorset District Council was elected every four years, with latterly 36 councillors being elected at each election. After 1976 the Conservative party held a majority on the council apart from a period between the 1995 and 1999 elections when the Liberal Democrats had control. Following the 2015 election the council's politicians were:-

Party	Councillors
Conservative Party	24
Liberal Democrats	3
Independent	2

The district and its council were abolished on 1 April 2019 and, together with the other 4 Dorset districts outside the greater Bournemouth area, formed a new Dorset unitary authority.

== Settlements ==
Settlements with a population over 2,500 are in bold.

- **Alderholt**
- Chalbury, **Colehill**, **Corfe Mullen**, Cranborne
- Edmondsham
- **Ferndown**
- Gussage
- Hinton Martell, Hinton Parva, Holt, Horton
- Long Crichel
- Moor Crichel
- Pamphill, Pentridge
- **St Ives**, St Leonards, Shapwick, Sixpenny Handley, Sturminster Marshall
- **Verwood**
- **West Moors**, **West Parley**, **Wimborne Minster**, Wimborne St Giles, Witchampton, Woodlands

== Premises ==
Until 2016 the council was based at Woodleaze, a large house at Furzehill in the parish of Colehill, just north of the town of Wimborne Minster. Woodleaze had previously served as the headquarters of Wimborne and Cranborne Rural District Council. In 2016 the council moved to Allenview House on Hanham Road in the town centre of Wimborne Minster.

== See also ==
- List of civil parishes in East Dorset
- List of churches in East Dorset
