= Ferndown Upper School =

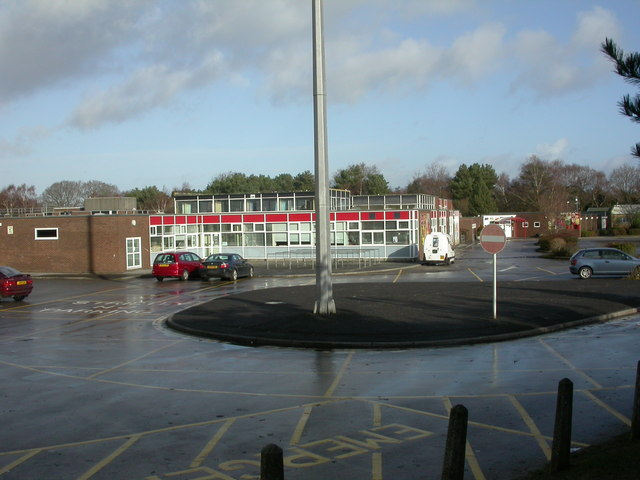

Location
- Cherry Grove; Ferndown, Dorset, BH22 9EY; England; 50°48′22″N 1°54′09″W

Information
- Type: Community school
- Established: 1972
- Local authority: Dorset
- Department for Education URN: 113854 Tables
- Ofsted: Reports
- Chair of Governors: Robert Osborough
- Headteacher: Philip Jones
- Gender: Coeducational
- Age: 13 to 19
- Enrolment: 1027
- Houses: Thornton; Read; Cheetham; Ashton
- Colours: Red, Green, Purple and Blue)

Ferndown Upper School is a comprehensive school and sixth form located in Ferndown, Dorset. Opened in 1972, it has grown to accommodate a broad and successful curriculum including a specialism in STEM (science, technology and maths) and the Arts.

== Academics ==
For three consecutive years now Ferndown Upper School achieved high academic success with the best results for GCSE progress in Dorset. The last time the DfE produced performance tables Ferndown Upper was declared the 'Best Upper School in the Country'.

=== Science Curriculum ===
It is one of few non-selective state schools in the country to enable all students to study all three single science GCSEs. This was to ensure equal access to all students and to build upon the excellent record that Ferndown Upper had of delivering Biology, Chemistry and Physics. An All Party Parliamentary Committee looking into STEM education quoted this curriculum innovation as examples of best practice in a Parliamentary Report published in May 2020.

== Notable Former Pupils ==
Sam Surridge - Football player for Stoke City F.C.

Nigel Smart - Professor of Cryptography

== Digital Technology Curriculum ==
The school has expanded its specialism into a broad but specialist digital technology curriculum that now even goes beyond the classroom. The school boasts its own Computing and Robotics Centre, a set of specialist laboratories to allow digital engineering, software engineering and robotics in their curriculum from Year 9 to Year 13. This was recently further enhanced by a £100,000 grant from the Wolfson Foundation in 2020 to help develop some of these specialist areas.

In September 2020, the school with designated a ‘FIRST Champion School’ in recognition of its work as a centre of excellence in engaging students in engineering and robotics. In January 2020 the department's fernDOWNLOAD Robotics club became regional champions in the FIRST Tech Challenge competition (Season 19/20). The department now boasts the largest girls’ competitive robotics club in the country.

In 2020 Ferndown Upper School was announced to be the first school in Dorset to be launching the new pioneering 'T Level' courses at its Sixth Form in 2022. The school will be the first to fully train Software Developers and Network Engineers with these new qualifications developed with assistance from local industry.
