= St Mary's Church, Ferndown =

St Mary's Church, Ferndown, Dorset
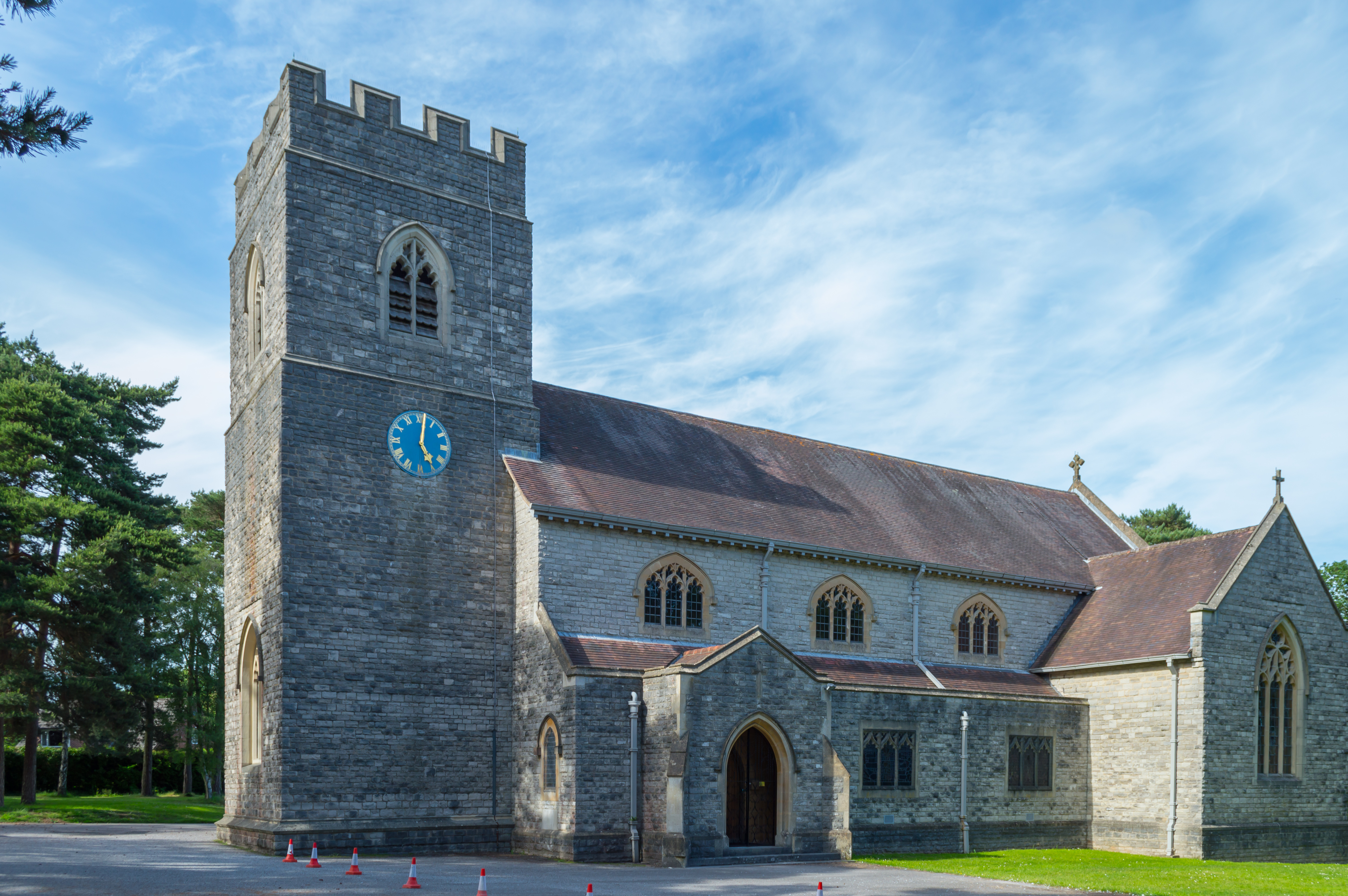
- St Mary's Church from the south west

- Location within Dorset
- 50.79979°N 1.89412°W
- Country: England
- Denomination: Church of England
- Website: www.stmarys-ferndown.org.uk

History
- Dedication: St Mary

Administration
- Province: Canterbury
- Diocese: Salisbury

St Mary's Church is a Church of England parish church in the town of Ferndown, Dorset.

== History ==
Building of the nave began in 1933, on land given in 1932, with the chancel and sanctuary added in 1939, transept and vestries added in 1966, and tower completed in 1972. A church hall complex was added in 1983, and extended in 2002 and 2015.
