= Longham United Reformed Church =

Church in Dorset, England

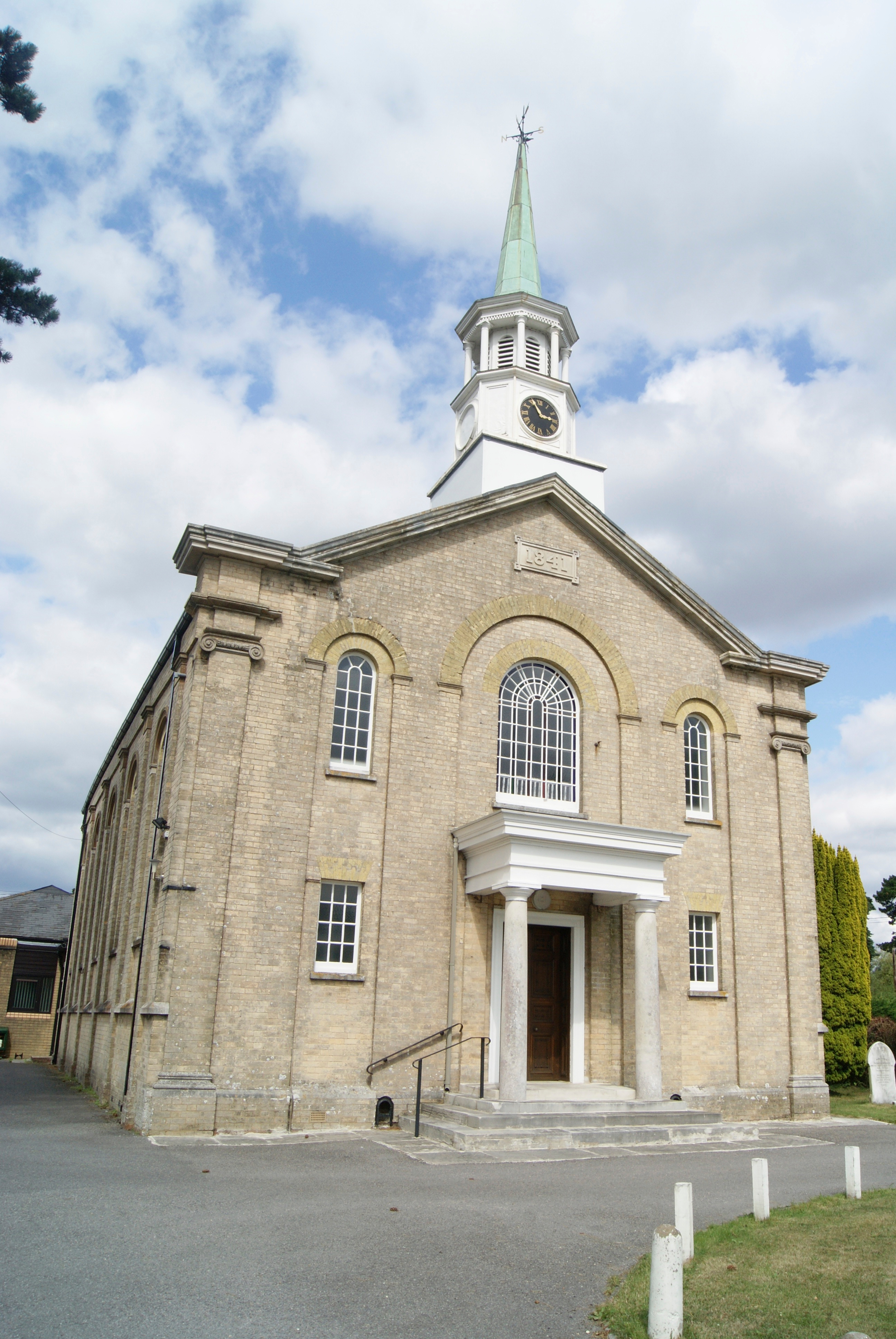
- Longham United Reformed Church in 2013

Religion
- Affiliation: Christianity
- Ecclesiastical or organizational status: active

Location
- Location: Longham, Dorset, England
- Interactive map of Longham United Reformed Church
- Coordinates: 50.78660°N 1.90716°W

Architecture
- Type: Church
- Style: Georgian architecture
- Completed: 1841

Longham United Reformed Church is a Grade II listed United Reformed church near Longham near Ferndown in Dorset, England.

== History ==
The church was built in 1841 and was listed in 1974. The church is constructed with white brickwork in Flemish bond and yellow brick arches with dressings of Portland stone.

In 2023, it was reported that the church was being sold. The pre-school which had used the church for 60 years moved to Parley Community Centre. The building is now affiliated with the Maranatha Christian Church.
