= Alderholt =

Village and parish in Dorset, England

Coordinates: 50.9133°N 1.8317°W

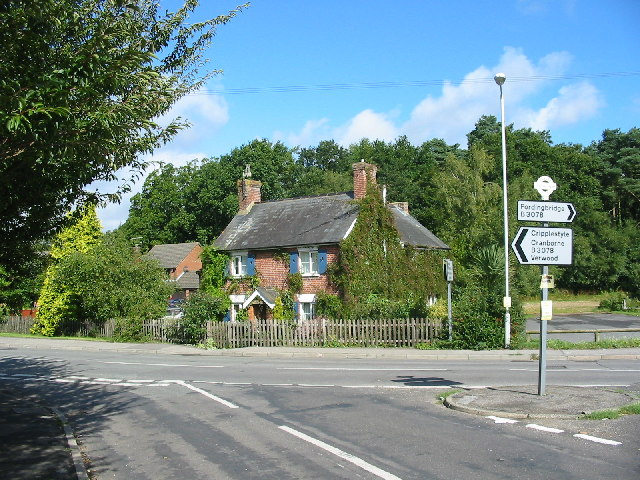
- Charing Cross, Alderholt

- Location within Dorset
- Population: 3,171 (2011)
- OS grid reference: SU119126
  - London: 82 mi (132 km) SW
- Civil parish: Alderholt
- Unitary authority: Dorset
- Ceremonial county: Dorset
- Region: South West
- Country: England
- Sovereign state: United Kingdom
- Post town: Fordingbridge
- Postcode district: SP6
- Dialling code: 01425
- Police: Dorset
- Fire: Dorset and Wiltshire
- Ambulance: South Western
- UK Parliament: North Dorset

Alderholt (/ˈɔːldərhoʊlt/ AWL-dər-hohlt) is a large village and civil parish in east Dorset, England; situated 3 miles (4.8 km) west of Fordingbridge. The parish includes the hamlets of Crendell and Cripplestyle. The parish had a population of 3,195 at the 2021 census.

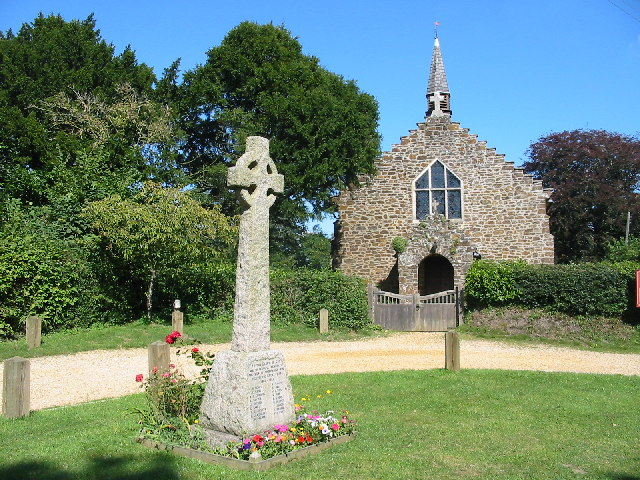
The church of St James

The village has a Co-op Food convenience store, veterinary clinic and part-time GP surgery. There are three churches in the village: Alderholt Chapel, St James's Church of England, and the Tabernacle Gospel Church.

The village also has a large recreation ground with a sports and social club, two tennis courts, and a children's play area.

== Transport ==
The main road running through the village is the B3078 connecting Alderholt to Fordingbridge and Shaftesbury.

Until 1964, Alderholt was served by Daggons Road railway station, west of the village on a line connecting to Fordingbridge and Salisbury to the north, and Verwood and Wimborne to the south.

== Governance ==
The civil parish was created in 1894. A book was published in 1994 by Alderholt Parish Council recording parish details and interest over the 100 years.

Alderholt is in Dorset unitary district. It is part of the Cranborne and Alderholt ward which elects 1 member to Dorset Council.

Historically, Alderholt was in Wimborne and Cranborne Rural District from 1894 to 1974, and then East Dorset from 1974 until the creation of Dorset unitary district in 2019.

== Demographics ==
Census population of Alderholt parish
Census	Population	Households
2001	3,113	
2011	3,171	1,263
2021	3,195	1,313
