= Verwood =

Town in Dorset, England

Coordinates: 50.8815°N 1.8785°W

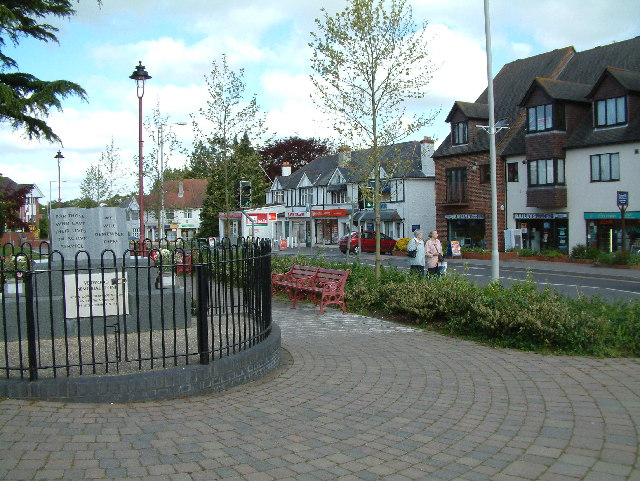
- Verwood town centre

- Location within Dorset
- Interactive map showing the parish boundary
- Population: 15,196 (Source: Mid Year Estimates, Office for National Statistics Jul-22)
- OS grid reference: SU0808
- Civil parish: Verwood
- Unitary authority: Dorset
- Ceremonial county: Dorset
- Region: South West
- Country: England
- Sovereign state: United Kingdom
- Post town: Verwood
- Postcode district: BH31
- Dialling code: 01202
- Police: Dorset
- Fire: Dorset and Wiltshire
- Ambulance: South Western
- UK Parliament: North Dorset

Verwood is a town and civil parish in eastern Dorset, England. The town lies 10 miles (16 km) north of Bournemouth and 13 miles (21 km) north east of Poole as the crow flies. The civil parish comprises the town of Verwood together with the extended village of Three Legged Cross, and in 2014 had a population of 15,170 (according to Dorset County Council). Verwood is the largest town in Dorset without an upper school. It sits on the River Crane which later becomes Moors River.

== History ==
=== Early history ===
Verwood was originally recorded as Beau Bois (Norman French: "beautiful wood") in 1288, and it was not until 1329 that it got the name Verwood, which developed from Fairwood or The Fayrewood. Verwood is recorded as "Fairwod" (1329) and as "Fayrwod" (1436); this name has the meaning "fair wood" and the modern form shows the change of initial "f" to "v" characteristic of many Southwestern English dialects.

=== Pottery industry ===
The East Dorset pottery industry, known collectively as Verwood Pottery, thrived from early times on the clay soils of the neighbourhood which had ample firing material close at hand. The major production was of domestic earthenware although finer and more unusual pieces have been found from earlier times. In the latter days ornamental and novelty items were produced.

Until the end of their useful life, the methods of production had not varied from Roman times, all the processes being carried out with no mechanisation or electrification. For example, the clay was always trodden by foot and not mixed in a pug mill. The wheel was turned by an assistant with a pole or handle, and the kilns were wood-fired. For these reasons the Crossroads Pottery, then the last remaining in the area, attracted national and local newspaper attention in the early to mid-20th century.

The industry was not confined to a local sales base. Hawkers, or "higglers", took the wares for sale over a wide area of southern England. They were also exported abroad, especially to Newfoundland which had a thriving trade with the nearby port of Poole. Examples of Verwood pots can be seen at the Verwood Heathland Heritage Centre.

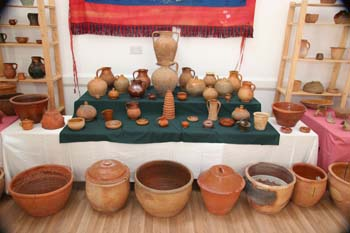
Verwood Heathland Heritage Centre

=== Remembrance of those that fell in war ===
The Verwood Memorial Recreation Ground is dedicated to those who fell in the World War I, and is owned by the Verwood Memorial Recreation Ground Trust. Members of the Verwood Town Council automatically become trustees. The recreation ground land was purchased by public subscription in 1920 and the parish council was to hold the land to the benefit of the inhabitants of the parish of Verwood for use as a public recreation ground. The recreation ground comprises an area big enough for a football pitch and several children's play areas. It is across the road from the Memorial Stone, and as of 2013 had a set of wrought iron gates with a plaque on them saying "Verwood Recreation Ground / In memory of those that fell in the Great War 1914-1918".

It is widely believed that the oak trees around the recreation ground were planted in remembrance of each local person who fell in the First World War (one tree per person). These trees each have tree preservation orders to protect them.

In 1955 a formal committee of trustees was set up with the intention of building a new village hall, to be called the "Memorial Hall" in remembrance of those locals who valiantly gave their lives in World War II and it was agreed that the new hall should be constructed at the recreation ground. The official opening of Verwood Memorial Hall took place on 9 May 1959. The Memorial Hall was extended during the Queen's Silver Jubilee year (1977). The hall has come under threat on a number of occasions, each time public pressure resisting its demolition.

The Memorial Stone is across the road from the Memorial Hall and the Memorial Recreation Ground. Two plaques on the front of the stone are dedicated to the gallant souls who died in both world wars.

=== 1980–present ===
Verwood's first supermarket opened in the 1980s. In 1987 the population of Verwood reached 9,856. In 2001 the town's population reached 12,069. Verwood Heritage Centre was opened by Robert Gascoyne-Cecil, 7th Marquess of Salisbury. The centre is used as a museum of local history and a coffee shop. In 2007 the Verwood Hub, a multi-purpose cinema and theatre, opened to the public.

By 2014 the town had a population of over 15,000 and the Verwood Town Plan, published that year, identified a number of priorities including providing residents with new facilities, such as a swimming pool and an upper school.

== Politics and government ==
Verwood is a part of the North Dorset constituency, represented in the House of Commons of the UK Parliament since 2015 by Simon Hoare, a Conservative.

There has been a parish or town council in Verwood since 1894 when it had a population of only 1,190. In 1987, the parish council passed the necessary resolution to become a town council under provisions made in the Local Government Act 1972. In 1992 the new Verwood Town Council offices opened.

Verwood Town Council, the elected body of the town, consists of eighteen members representing the civil parish. There are four wards in the civil parish: Dewlands North Ward (two councillors), Dewlands South Ward (eight councillors), Stephen's Castle Ward (seven councillors) and Three Legged Cross Ward (one councillor). As a council they meet eight times a year at the council offices and three times a year at the Village Hall, Three Legged Cross.

The council operates with three sub-committees which each report to the full Council; the Finance and General Purposes Committee, the Planning Consultative Committee and the Amenities Committee.

Verwood is a ward of Dorset Council, and (since the 2019 election) is represented by three County Councillors - Toni Coombs (Conservative), Spencer Flower (Conservative, Leader of the Council) and Simon Gibson (Conservative).

== Community facilities ==
A country market which is open from 10:00 to 11:30 is held each Friday in the Memorial Hall. The market sells locally produced seasonal vegetables and fruit, plants and cut flowers, homemade cakes and jams and craft items.

The town has a number of shopping areas, primarily in the town centre, however most of the supermarkets are outside the town centre. Eating establishments include an Italian restaurant, Indian restaurant and takeaway, cafe, fish and chip shop, kebab shop, and a Chinese take-away.

Verwood is home to the Hub, a community facility which opened in April 2007. The Hub houses the 300 seat Merryfield Theatre, a 100-seat hall and a number of other smaller rooms. These facilities are used for films, plays, concerts and many other activities and the rooms can be hired by various organisations. In the centre of the Hub is a bistro area, surrounded by art displays and various exhibitions.

== Media and culture ==
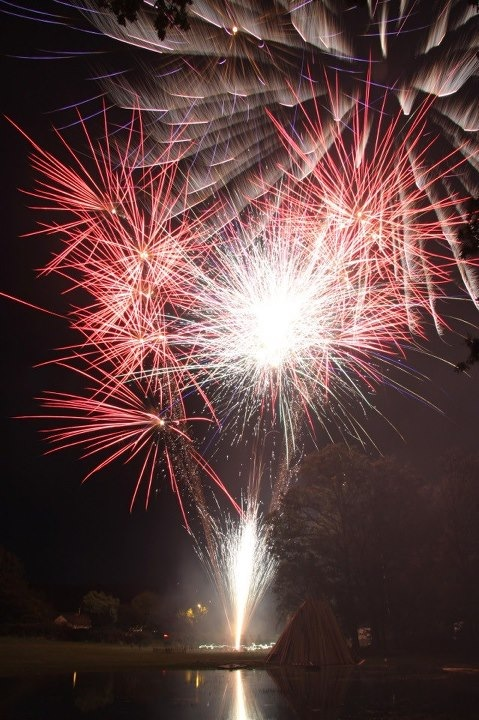
Flameburst 2012 – main display across the lake

Verwood has three brass bands: Verwood Concert Brass Principal Band, Verwood Town Band, and Verwood Community Band. As of 2022, Verwood Concert Brass is in the championship section in the West of England region under the baton of Kevin Smith. The band became West of England 4th Section champions in 2005 and 2006. This resulted in two trips to the National Brass Band Finals of Great Britain in Harrogate, where they finished 6th and 7th respectively. In September 2008 the band were placed second at the 3rd section national finals after winning the area championship in March, and made another finals appearance in 2009 in the 2nd section. They perform in many concerts in the local area, including several performances at the Hub.

Verwood holds an annual carnival around the time of the spring bank holiday. A thriving carnival committee ensures that all organisations and individuals in and around Verwood are able to participate in the annual carnival parade, typically including floats from Verwood Guides, Verwood Hillside First School, Verwood Youth Club The Hive, and the Verwood Pantomime Society. There are also marching bands, fire engines, individual displays and much more. Verwood also hosts a Rustic Fayre on August bank holiday Monday, and Flameburst on the last Saturday in October.

Local TV coverage is provided by BBC South and ITV Meridian. Television signals are received from the Rowridge TV transmitter.

Local radio stations are BBC Radio Solent, Heart South, Greatest Hits Radio South, and Forest FM is a community radio station, broadcast from Verwood for listeners in Dorset.

== Sports and recreation ==
Verwood is home to Verwood Town F.C., a football club founded in 1920. They are based at Potterne Park and are currently members of Wessex League Premier Division.

Rossgarth Youth Football Club was one of the most successful clubs in the area and had several teams covering all age groups for boys and girls, up to adult level. Eddie Howe, the former AFC Bournemouth manager, is a former Rossgarth player. However, the club merged with Verwood Town F.C. in 2017, "cementing their close ties".

Verwood Runners are an inclusive running club affiliated with England Athletics. Originating in 2014 as an informal group called the Verwood Running Buddies, the club has established a formal core team and qualified run leadership to accommodate its expanding membership.In 2020, Verwood Runners was named the South West "RunTogether Group of the Year" by England Athletics.

Verwood Cricket Club has several teams in both adult and youth leagues. Home games are played at Potterne Park.

Verwood Bowling Club play lawn bowls at Moorlands Road, and have several men's and ladies' teams.

Verwood Rugby Club, founded in 1994, play at Potterne Park. Verwood RUFC are currently members of Dorset & Wilts Division 3 South League. Dorset Dockers Rugby Club have two teams, playing Barbarian-style rugby.

Potterne Park play area provides the community with 12 acres (4.9 ha) of sporting provision, including rugby, football, tennis, netball, cricket and a skate park.

== Stephen's Castle and Stephen's Stone ==
Stephen's Castle is an Iron Age barrow set in a site of special scientific interest (SSSI), to the North of Verwood and at the top of an old sand and gravel quarry. It is a scheduled monument. The barrow was excavated by archaeologists in 1828, where human remains dating back to the Iron Age were found.

The Stephen Stone is now well hidden amongst pine trees, surrounded by boggy ground. Located approximately 400m north-east from Stephen's Castle, legend has it that Stephen was a local tribal chief of great strength. He was supposed to have hurled the 'Stephen stone' half a mile into Ringwood Forest, no mean feat as the stone weighs around 3 tonnes. In 1220 Stephen's Stone was recorded as "le Horestone" and there was a boundary point in this area so it could be a boundary stone.

The Stone is an ancient block of sandstone, placed in a seemingly random location deep in the woods. It is not a native sandstone and no other such stones have been found in the area. This type of object is known as a 'monolith' – a single massive stone or rock placed as a monument. Although it is now lying flat, it is thought to have originally stood upright so its height above the ground may have exceeded 10 feet. This being so, it would be one of the largest stones of this type ever to have stood in Dorset. The area is once meant to have been open heathland, with the view maybe extending as far as Hengistbury Head on the coast.

Lost for many years in the overgrown wilderness, only scattered references to the existence of such a stone were available. In 1841, an author recounted a 561-year-old testimony speaking of a large stone on the heathland of Verwood. In 1993, a prominent sacred site investigator named Peter Knight led a project to rediscover the stone. The site was then cleared in 1994 to allow public access.

Records suggest that many years ago, the local inhabitants regarded the stone with a sort of superstitious reverence and told long tales about the impossibility of removing it. There was meant to be a golden casket buried underneath the stone, and a belief that "if anyone attempted to remove it, a black bird of dire omen perched upon its top to scare the miscreants." Perhaps the 'golden casket' was in fact a metaphoric reference to powerful supernatural energies that may be accessible at this location. For whatever reason, warnings may have evolved to inform people not to misuse the site.

== Transport ==
The town effectively sits on the cross-roads of the B3081 and the B3072; connected to the A31 and A338 to the south-east via the B3081 and south to A31 at Ferndown via the B3072.

Morebus route X6 provides an hourly stopping service to Poole, as well as an express service to Ringwood and Bournemouth.

Verwood once had its own railway station, served by the Salisbury and Dorset Junction Railway. This was closed in 1964. The nearest station to the town now is Christchurch, 12 miles (19 km) away.

== Education ==
Schooling in Verwood is based on the 3-tier system, although after first school and middle school, pupils usually transfer to either Queen Elizabeth's School, Wimborne Minster or Ferndown Upper School.

There are three first schools, accommodating children aged from 4–9: Verwood CofE First, Hillside First and Trinity CofE First.

Emmanuel CofE Middle School takes children from the three First schools, at ages 9–13. The school is on the same campus as Verwood First School.

Plans to open an upper school in Verwood were discussed as part of the 2014 Verwood Town Plan.

== Notable residents ==
- Lee Camp – AFC Bournemouth player
- Michael Giles – original drummer for King Crimson, had a home studio
- Harold Gimblett – cricketer
- Gordon Haskell – pop music vocalist, songwriter and bassist
- Eddie Howe – AFC Bournemouth former manager and former player
- Lionel Jeffries – actor, writer and director
- Darren Kenny – Paralympic cyclist
- Jessie Matthews – actress, singer and dancer
- Buster Merryfield – actor
- Sean O'Driscoll – first team coach Oldham Athletic FC and former AFC Bournemouth football player and manager
- Tony Pulis – Football manager and former AFC Bournemouth football player and manager
- Matt Tubbs – footballer
- Adam Booth – Great Britain Youth International

== Twin towns ==
Verwood twinned with Champtoceaux in Maine-et-Loire, France, in 1985. It twinned with Liederbach am Taunus in Main-Taunus-Kreis, Germany, in 1992.
