= Colehill =

Parish in Dorset, England

Coordinates: 50°48′N 1°58′W

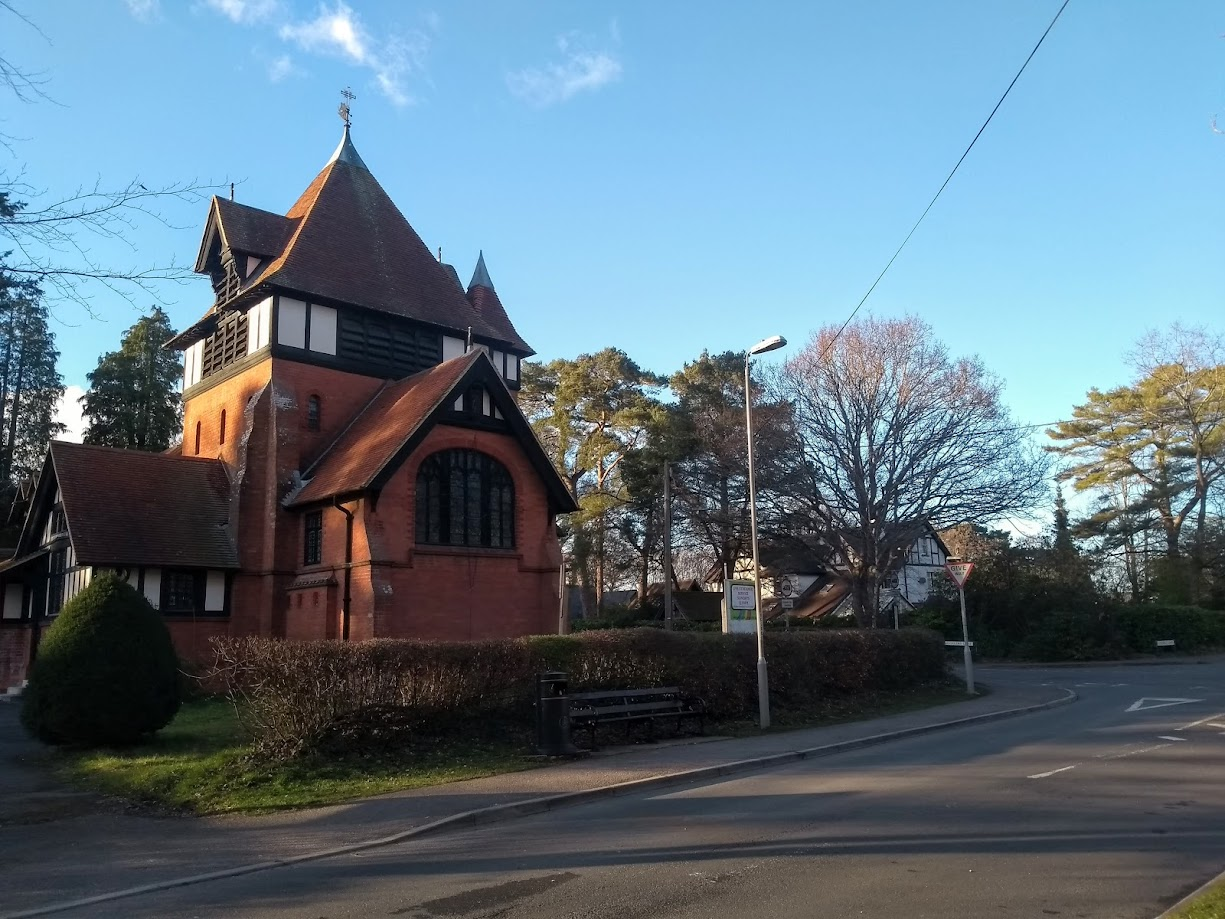

Colehill is a town and civil parish in south-east Dorset, England. It lies between Wimborne Minster to the west and Ferndown to the east and is part of the South East Dorset conurbation. Parts of the parish fall within the South West Hampshire/South East Dorset Green Belt.

Colehill had a population of 7,498 at the 2021 census.

The Church of England parish church is St Michael and All Angels. It was designed by Caröe in 1893 and is a half brick and half timber construction in the Arts and Crafts style. Nearby and close to the war memorial at the centre of the village are the Triangle Woods which have village green status. There are areas of common land, a recreation ground at Oliver's Park, and a Local Nature Reserve at Leigh Common. The area is well wooded and the local Forestry England plantation at Cannon Hill is very popular for walking and mountain biking

Colehill has a village hall, Colehill Village Hall, and a community library which since 2013 has been run by volunteers with support from Dorset Council.

== History ==
The name Colehill originated in 1431 as Colhulle, becoming Colhill in 1518 and Collehill in 1547, later getting the simplified spelling of Colehill, but the origins of Colehill as a settlement predate this by a long way.

Six round barrows, which can still be seen, show that people lived here as early as 2000 BC. The River Stour would have been navigable; there is evidence that in about 500 BC, peoples from Continental Europe were populating the South West, bringing the culture of the early Iron Age. Fortifications at Hengistbury Head and more forts inland were established then.

Part of the tracks survive, running parallel to the river from the coastal fort through modern locations such as Parley and Stapehill to Badbury Rings. It is thought that the line of Middlehill Road derives from one of these very early tracks.

Later in Roman times Wimborne developed as an important trading centre on the River Stour, and as a junction for further tracks from Poole to Badbury Rings and on to Salisbury. Another track radiating eastward possibly set the line for what was to become in modern times the A31 road. Bridges replaced the fords (Canford) in about 100 AD.

There then followed the Saxon invasion and the formation of the Kingdom of Wessex. Agriculture became established and with it clearance of some small plots on the sunny heathland slopes around Colehill. Over the centuries farms grew until, with the impetus of inclosure acts (1750 to 1860), they were consolidated into the estates that we know of today – Kingston Lacy, Hanham and Uddens estates.

=== 20th and 21st century expansion ===
There are a few houses in Colehill dating from the 1860s, but the settlement was small until rapid expansion took place in the 20th century. The population rose from 1,786 in 1951 to 5,370 in 1971. Several large estates of modern family homes were built and there is quite a lot of infill building.

A parish plan for Colehill was published in 2008. Many of the planned actions have been implemented, including a community library. The East Dorset District Council Core Strategy, approved in 2013, placed over half of the district's new neighbourhood development in Colehill; it comprises 630 homes along the Cranborne Road and 350 south of the Leigh Road A31.

== Education ==
There are two first schools in Colehill, Colehill First School and Hayeswood First School, and a middle school, St Michael's.

There was a Roman Catholic primary school, St Catherine's RC Primary School & Kindergarten. The school closed in July 2021 due to falling pupil numbers. There is a special education foundation school, Beaucroft Foundation School. There is also a private school, Dumpton School.

== Politics and governance ==
At the lower level of local government, Colehill is a civil parish with a parish council, which has two electoral wards (Colehill Ward, and Colehill Hayes Ward). On the 9th December 2025, following a public consultation, Colehill Parish Council voted unanimously to rebrand itself as Colehill Town Council to reflect its status as one of the largest settlements in Dorset and to strengthen the protection provided by the green belt between Colehill and the neighbouring towns of Wimborne Minster and Ferndown.

At the upper level of local government, Colehill is in the Dorset unitary district. For elections to Dorset Council it is part of the Colehill & Wimborne Minster East electoral ward.

Colehill became part of the Mid Dorset and North Poole constituency at the 2010 general election.

Historically, Colehill was part of Wimborne & Cranborne Rural District from 1894 to 1974, and then East Dorset district from 1974 until Dorset became a unitary district in 2019.

== Demographics ==
Census population of Colehill parish
Census	Population	Households
1921	1,360	
1931	1,500	
1951	1,790	
1961	2,300	
1971	5,370	
1981	6,700	
1991	7,140	
2001	7,000	
2011	6,907	2,857
2021	7,498	3,152

== Notable people ==
- Tim Berners Lee- World Wide Web creator
- Micheal Medwin- Actor
- Roger Johnson- Footballer
- Al Stewart- Musician
