= West Moors =

Village in Dorset, England

Coordinates: 50.824°N 1.8885°W

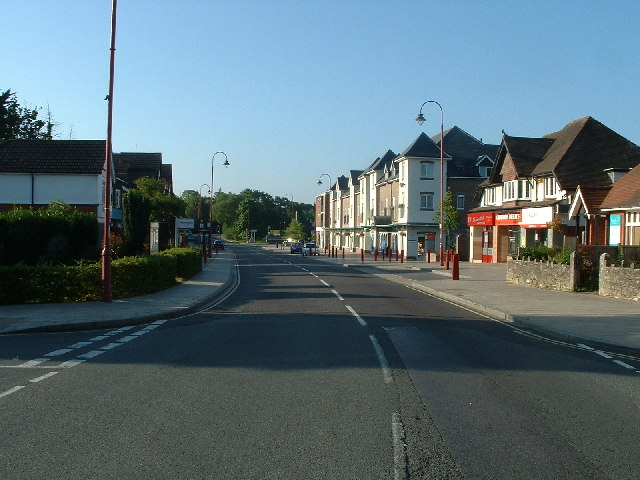
- West Moors village centre

- Location within Dorset
- Population: 7,561
- OS grid reference: SU0802
- Civil parish: West Moors
- Unitary authority: Dorset
- Ceremonial county: Dorset
- Region: South West
- Country: England
- Sovereign state: United Kingdom
- Post town: FERNDOWN
- Postcode district: BH22
- Dialling code: 01202
- Police: Dorset
- Fire: Dorset and Wiltshire
- Ambulance: South Western
- UK Parliament: Christchurch

West Moors is a village in Dorset, England, on the northern fringe of the Poole-Bournemouth conurbation, just outside the larger settlements of Ferndown and Verwood. The parish of West Moors had an estimated population of 7,400 in 2004, increasing to 7,561 for both the parish and electoral ward at the 2011 Census. The parish council was renamed West Moors Town Council in 2020.

West Moors rose to local prominence with the building of the Southampton and Dorchester and Salisbury and Dorset Junction railway lines in the late 19th century and although main line services were later diverted via Bournemouth, West Moors railway station was served by a branch line railway until 4 May 1964. The only remnants of these lines through the village are the original level crossing gatekeeper's cottage on Station Road, and the Castleman Trailway footpath following the original trackbed leading to Ringwood to the east and Poole to the west. This however, was recently resurfaced and the central reservation was removed, rendering the southernmost of the two tracks largely unusable, and causing it to lose its former authentic look.

The village expanded with the development of the military fuel depot located outside the village but within the West Moors civil parish. The depot is home to the Defence School of Petroleum, and also to the Dorset & Wiltshire Fire and Rescue Service Training Centre. In April 2017 the Royal Air Force relocated their Fuels Training school from RAF Halton to MoD West Moors. In July 2018 it was announced that after over 80 years the Military would move from West Moors, under project Wellsley the RAF would relocate to MoD Worthy Down in January 2019 and the Army would have moved by April 2020. In the past many military families were housed in their own housing estates, however most jobs are now undertaken by civilian personnel and the military housing sold off. More recent population increases have been due to the influx of commuters, both to Bournemouth and Poole, and to more remote destinations such as Southampton, and London.

West Moors has a mixed population, with a relatively high proportion of elderly people. There are two first schools, one middle school, two youth clubs; including the west moors scout group, and a skatepark.

There are various shops including one butcher, one baker and two pubs. There is also the West Moors Social Club which has entertainment nights. Moors Valley Country Park is just outside the parish boundary (3 miles from the village), and is easily accessible from the Castleman Trailway.

The village's sports facilities include two football pitches (Fryers Playing Field). The tennis courts have recently been refurbished into an artificial floodlit grass football facility and a multi-use area that can be used as two tennis courts (tarmacadam surface) or other sports. There is also a playpark on Fryer’s field and on the other side of the village (Shaftesbury Road) there is another slighter smaller play park.

== Politics ==
After 2019 structural changes to local government in England, West Moors is part of the West Moors and Three Legged Cross ward which elects 2 members to Dorset Council.
