= Salisbury and Dorset Junction Railway =

Closed railway line in Dorset, England

Overview
- Locale: England
- Continues as: London and South Western Railway

History
- Opened: 1866
- Closed: 4 May 1964

Technical
- Track gauge: 1,435 mm (4 ft 8 1/2 in)

The Salisbury and Dorset Junction Railway was a railway company, that built a line from a junction near Salisbury to another near West Moors on the Ringwood to Wimborne line. It ran through the counties of Wiltshire, Hampshire and Dorset in England. It opened the line in 1866, and was worked by the London and South Western Railway (LSWR).

It was a single-track line, about 19 miles long. The line did not perform well in financial terms, and its directors continually pressed the LSWR to improve the train service and make better through passenger journeys possible, but the line remained of local significance only. The company was absorbed by the LSWR in 1883. In a primarily rural locality the line never made much money, and it closed in 1964.

== History ==
=== First main lines ===
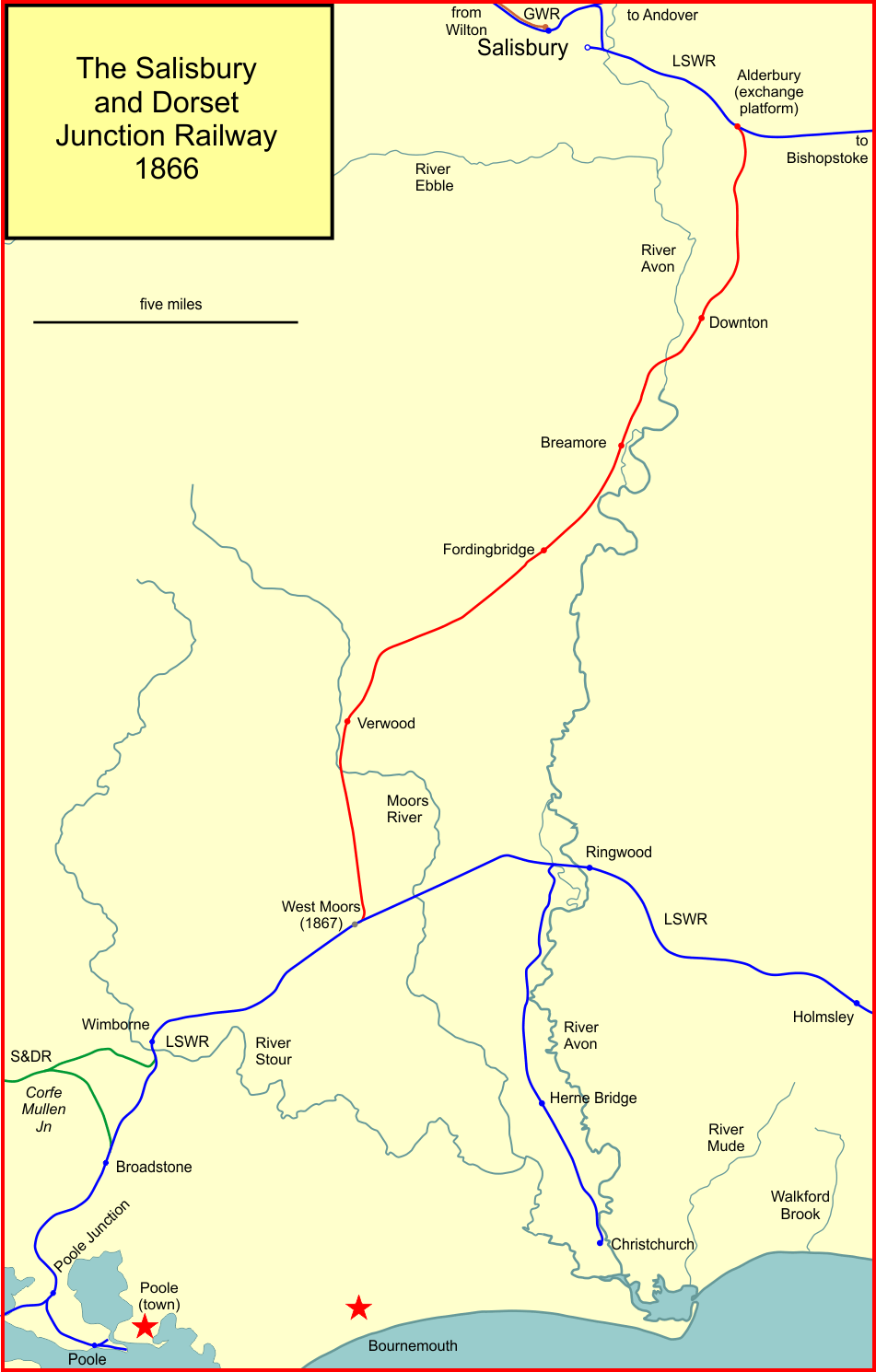
System map of the Salisbury and Dorset Junction Railway, 1866

Very early in the history of long distance railways in the United Kingdom, the London and Southampton Railway opened its line between those places in 1840. The following year it changed its name to the London and South Western Railway (LSWR). Having reached Southampton, the LSWR wished to extend, but it was an independent concern, the Southampton and Dorchester Railway, that built a line westwards, at first in the face of opposition from the LSWR. It had an energetic promoter, Charles Castleman, and made a rather indirect course towards Dorchester through Ringwood, and the epithet Castleman's Corkscrew stuck with it. It was absorbed into the LSWR after a reconciliation, in 1848.

Salisbury too was a desirable objective for the LSWR, which reached the city by a branch from Bishopstoke, by a line that opened in 1847. The present-day main line through Andover was still in the future.

The area between Salisbury and the coast was generally agricultural, although there was some industry in Fordingbridge; the harbour at Poole was an attractive destination for a new railway, with its opportunities for maritime trade. Some proposed lines on a north-south axis were put forward in the Railway Mania period of 1845, but they came to nothing. The Wilts, Somerset and Weymouth Railway (WS&WR) planned a line from a junction near Chippenham to Salisbury. Part of this was opened in 1847 but the company experienced difficulty in generating investment and progress towards completion was slow.

Nevertheless the LSWR reached Weymouth from Dorchester over the WS&WR in 1857, and the Company had reached Salisbury viaAndover in 1854.

=== The Salisbury and Dorset Junction Railway proposed ===
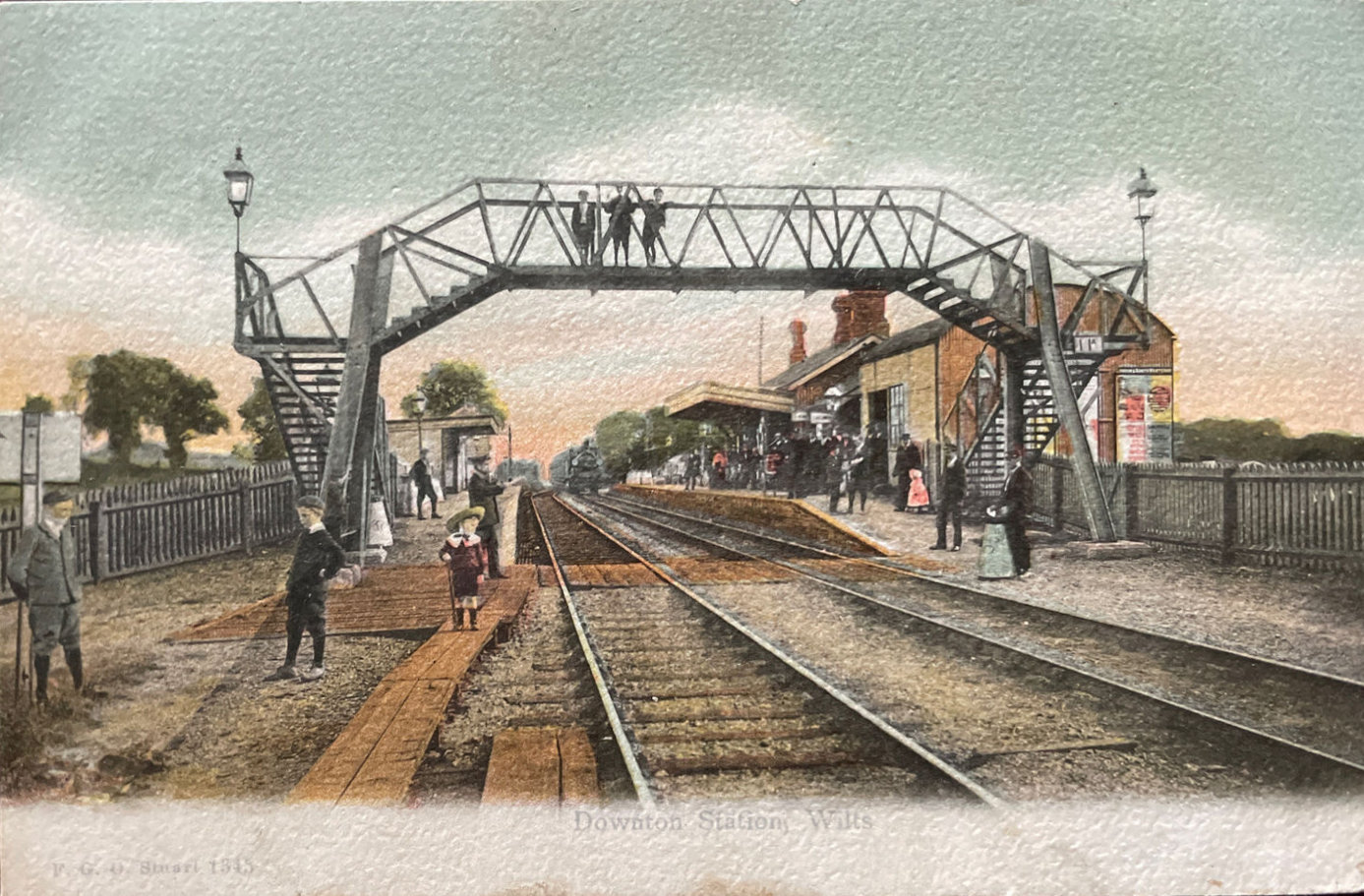
Downton railway station

As the railway network was taking shape, thoughts turned to interconnections that main lines did not provide, and a meeting in Salisbury on 20 October 1860 discussed just such a scheme. It was the Salisbury, Poole and Dorset Junction Railway, that would strike south from a junction just south of Salisbury to West Moors on the Southampton and Dorchester line, between Wimborne and Ringwood. There was to be a Poole branch, serving the harbour there, and a spur at Ringwood enabling direct running from West Moors to Christchurch and Bournemouth. This would use the Ringwood, Christchurch and Bournemouth Railway, which had been authorised in 1859 but not yet been built. It was opened in 1862. Bournemouth was insignificant and had been ignored at the time of the promotion of the Southampton and Dorchester Railway, but had been growing and was now important enough to warrant this connection.

Salisbury and Dorset Junction Railway Act 1861
- Act of Parliament
- Parliament of the United Kingdom
- Long title: An Act for making a Railway to improve the Communication between Salisbury and the Southern Part of the County of Dorset, and for other Purposes.
- Citation: 24 & 25 Vict. c. cxc

Dates
- Royal assent: 22 July 1861

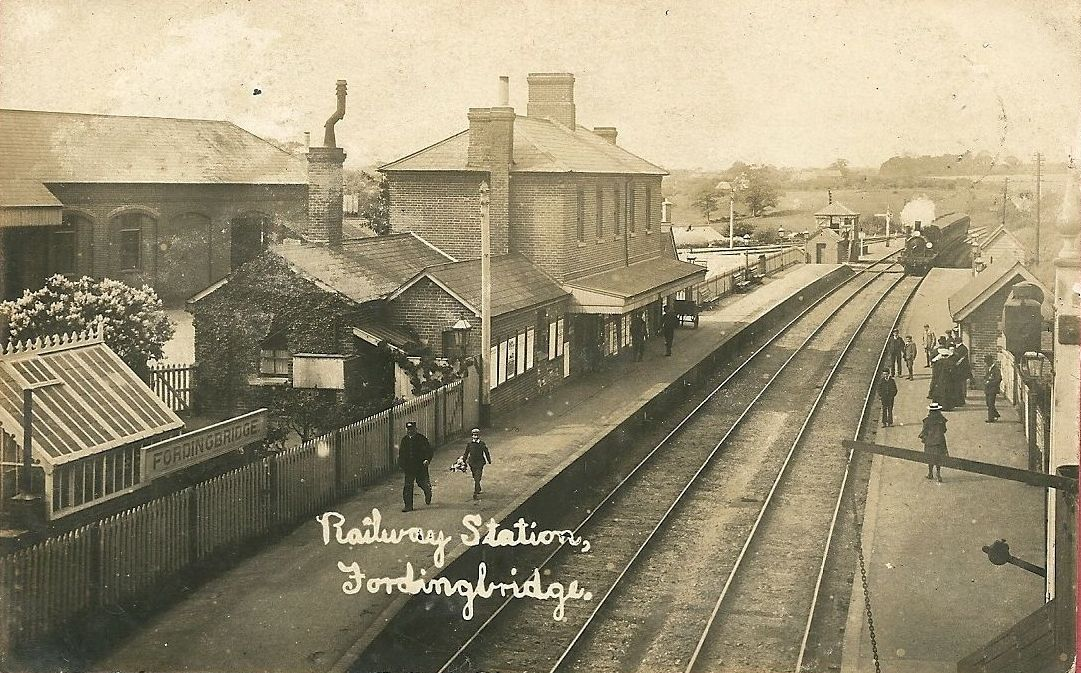
Fordingbridge railway station, on a contemporary postcard

An engineer named Hamilton Henry Fulton had surveyed the line and estimated that £180,000 was required to build it. The Salisbury and Dorset Junction Railway Act 1861 (24 & 25 Vict. c. cxc) authorising the line was given royal assent on 16 July 1861. The Poole branch and the spur at Ringwood were removed from the proposal at the committee stage in Parliament. Because of this reduction in scope, the company title was amended to The Salisbury and Dorset Junction Railway. The line was to be 18 miles long; authorised share capital was £160,000.

There was disappointing interest from potential investors, and early shareholders' general meetings failed to achieve a quorum, which was an alarmingly bad sign for commitment to the construction. In fact only about £10,000 of the share capital was subscribed locally. Work progressed all the same, until towards the end of 1866 the directors were complaining about the "constantly increasing requirements of the Board of Trade". This followed an inspection visit by Captain Tyler for the Board of Trade in August 1866. (Note: It is difficult to tell from the sources whether the mismatch was due to unreasonable strictness by the Board of Trade, or naivety on the part of Fulton. It might be suspected that the Board of Trade requirements were pretty clear, and it was the Company's understanding that was catching up. Both Williams and Bray might be read as tendentiously sympathetic to the Company.)

Complying with the Board of Trade requirements was presenting unexpected demands for money. To finance the extra work six shareholders lent £600 for three months, but Tyler's inspection of 30 October 1866 demanded yet more done. The contractor could not complete his obligations, and the company had no alternative but to request LSWR to help it. The larger company agreed to finish the work with Salisbury and Dorset money, and do the first year's maintenance, for £1,500. The six directors forming the Salisbury and Dorset deputation personally gave the security demanded, the board having on 15 November 1866 "resolved that the company will fully indemnify the directors against all loss and injury". This it did with a certificate under the Railway Companies' Powers Act 1864 (27 & 28 Vict. c. 120), raising £15,000 in new shares and £5,000 by debentures.

Despite the very difficult lack of share subscription, the directors had stated that certain extension lines would be applied for. In negotiation with the LSWR the Board agreed to set these schemes aside in exchange for agreement that the LSWR would work the line for 45% of gross receipts.

On 6 August 1866 the line was inspected by Captain Tyler. He found many defects on that inspection and again on a further inspection in October.

=== Opening, and early performance ===
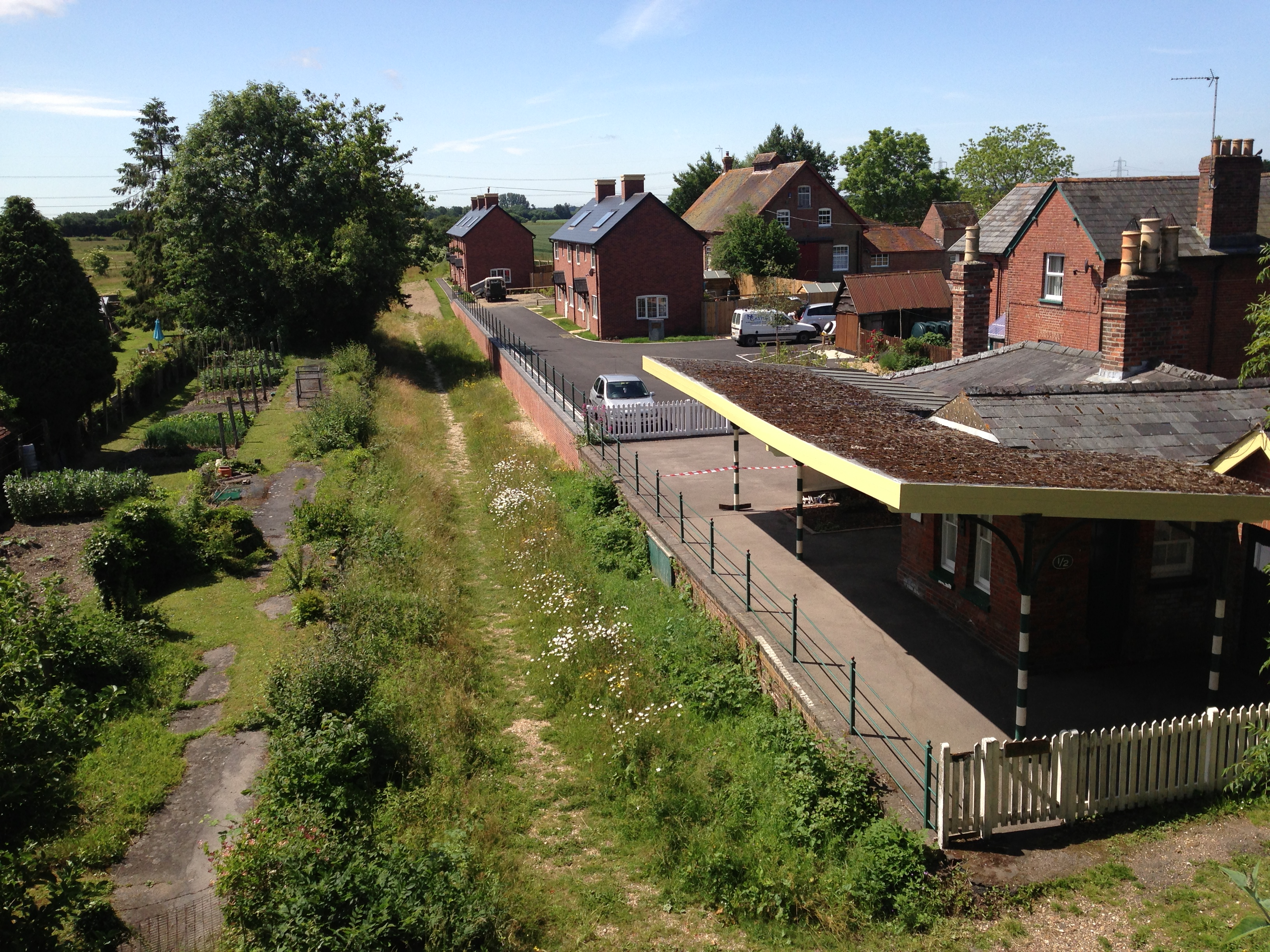
The former Breamore station buildings, now in use as a private dwelling

The line eventually opened on 20 December 1866.

Weekdays-only trains from Salisbury took passengers to Wimborne, Poole and Weymouth, with return trains from Dorchester, Poole and Wimborne. There were stations at Downton, Breamore, Fordingbridge and Verwood. The company's income to 30 June 1867 was £14. Once again the directors blamed external factors, in this case the lack of a junction station at West Moors, and what they described as "the difficulty and delays which always arise in diverting from its old channels the long established traffic".

At the shareholders' general meeting on 28 February 1867, the chairman complained about the low level of local subscriptions. This betrayed a continuing lack of share subscription in general. (Note: This was a case of complaining to persons present who had taken shares, because other persons not present had not taken shares.)

The first train service consisted of four trains each way daily except Sundays. The first train was through from Dorchester and the last through to Weymouth. The intermediate services operated to Poole (Hamworthy).

LSWR service timetables for February 1872 read:

"Alderbury Junction. New platforms have been placed on the Bishopstoke line at Alderbury Junction. The first up Salisbury & Dorset train will stop there to set down passengers for Bishopstoke, &c, who inform the guard. When passengers are so set down the signals at Alderbury Junction must be put on to stop the 7.55 am from Salisbury, which will stop to take up the passengers. No other trains except those two trams will stop at the platform."

Those platforms were made with old timber, and requests for a station (Note: As opposed to "platforms".) there were refused.

== West Moors station and junction ==
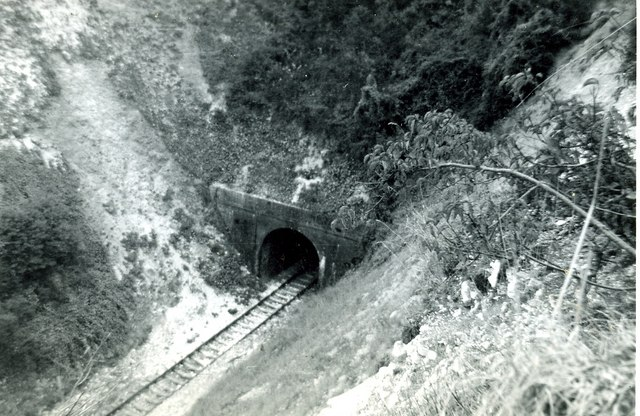
Downton - tunnel

When the line was planned, Bournemouth was considered an insignificant small settlement; between 1836 and 1862 it had "grown into existence", with a population of 691. In 1841 it did not warrant its own census summary, being included under Holdenhurst. Accordingly the southern end of the line was aligned towards Poole, for the harbour there, and the route therefore failed to adopt an easy course down the valley of the River Avon to Ringwood, an important town with a population of 2,075 in 1862. Instead it joined the former Southampton and Dorchester Railway route near West Moors, then also a small settlement. The junction there faced towards Wimborne and Poole.

In 1859 the Ringwood, Christchurch and Bournemouth Railway was authorised; it was opened in 1862; by this time it was plain that Bournemouth was a rising commercial and leisure centre. That line's junction with the former Southampton and Dorchester Railway route faced away from West Moors, so that both junctions were aligned in a way that was unhelpful to through transits from Salisbury to Bournemouth. A station near the West Moors junction had been promised, with the imposing title of Dorset Junction. It opened, more prosaically titled West Moors, on 1 August 1867. The Salisbury and Dorset paid £20 yearly towards the cost and all its trains stopped there. In 1870 there was a proposal to alter the junction to face Ringwood, but the scheme was never implemented.

== Financial problems ==
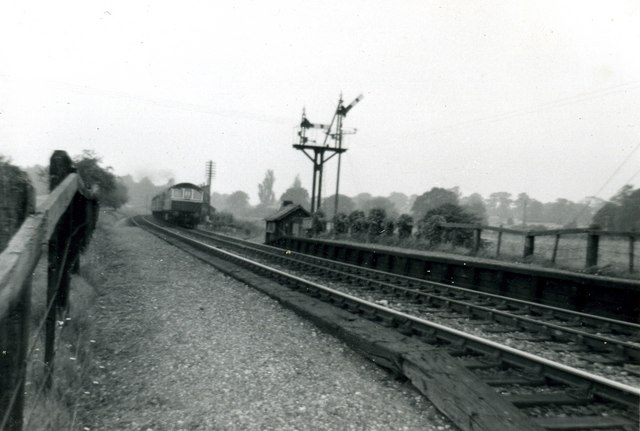
The platforms at Alderbury Halt shortly before closure; the train is approaching from Salisbury and the road is set for Romsey

A debenture holder waiting for interest unpaid since before the opening secured the appointment of a receiver, resulting in a scheme of arrangement of 11 March 1873 by which new debentures totalling £100,000 were created. The receiver was subsequently withdrawn. A 1,000 year lease, authorised by the South Western Railway (Amalgamation, &c.) Act 1873 (36 & 37 Vict. c. lxviii) of 16 June 1873, reflected the working agreement. Receipts rose from £4,981 in 1868 to £8,893 in 1875. On 1 January 1876 Alderholt station was opened; its name was changed to Daggons Road from 1 May 1876 to avoid confusion with Aldershot.

A running battle ensued over subsequent years between the local company and the LSWR. The main line company regarded the Salisbury and Dorset Junction as a purely local enterprise, while the S&DJR believed that if only the LSWR would treat it as a through north-south main line to Bournemouth, its fortunes would improve. There were several points of difficulty between the two companies, in particular the refusal of the LSWR to operate through trains from Salisbury to Bournemouth, and the fact that the line's trains arrived in Salisbury station at a platform remote from the platform where the London connectional train was waiting.

On 3 June 1882 the LSWR board considered absorption of the Salisbury and Dorset Junction company, having met with its board to discuss the matter. The move was agreed and the acquisition was authorised by the South Western Railway (Various Powers) Act 1883 (46 & 47 Vict. c. clxxxix) of 20 August 1883, retrospectively effective from 1 January 1883. The Salisbury company shareholders got about 70% of their investment.

== Downton accidents ==
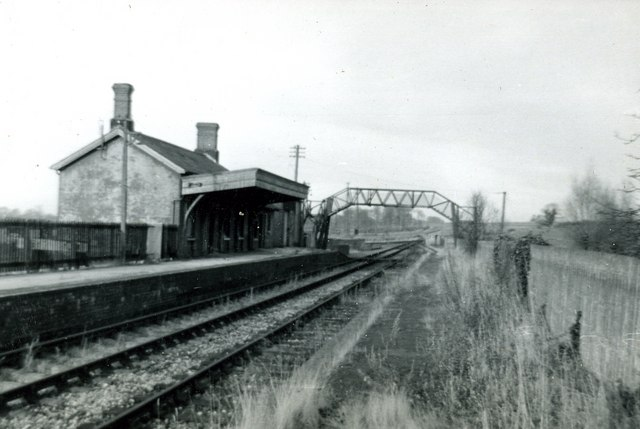
Downton railway station in 1964

On 3 June 1884 a Salisbury-Weymouth train parted from the engine and derailed some way south of Downton. 41 people were injured and 4 died. Three of these drowned after a carriage overturned into a drainage ditch. The inspecting officer for the Board of Trade, Colonel J. H. Rich, asserted that the cause was inferior passenger rolling stock travelling too fast over a track not designed for that speed. Rich's published view contradicted the recorded opinion of senior company officials. The widespread publicity generated by the case was damaging to the reputation of the LSWR.

A practical consequence was that a 25 mph speed restriction was imposed over the line, adding considerably to journey times, and resulting in some connections being broken.

== From 1923 ==
Under the provisions of the Railways Act 1921, the LSWR amalgamated with several other railways at the start of 1923 to create the Southern Railway. Then, with nationalisation in 1948 it became part of British Railways Southern Region.

Since the 1930s the business on the line had been dwindling, due to increasingly efficient competition from road transport in a predominantly rural area. In the 1950s the branch was used on summer Saturdays by through Bournemouth to Cardiff trains.

White, writing in 1961 said "Local passenger traffic has always been exiguous and services infrequent by the standards of Southern England. But Fordingbridge is a railhead for freight, and agricultural produce is forwarded from the other stations. The route has some pretensions at being a through one to Bournemouth at holiday times."

By 1963 the line was under consideration for closure; it was stated to be losing £96,000 a year. There was a public hearing into the closure of this and the Brockenhurst – Ringwood – Broadstone line at Bournemouth on 17 September 1963. The Times newspaper's special correspondent was not impressed by the turnout of objectors; 120 people had lodged objections, but in the hall there were only 60 persons, which included a fifteen-man committee, British Railways representatives, newspapermen and a strong team from Dorset County Council.

On 3 March 1964 it was announced that the closure of the line had been approved by Ernest Marples, the Minister of Transport. The line closed to all traffic on 4 May 1964. Also closed on that day was the original route of the Southampton and Dorchester line from Brockenhurst to Broadstone; the section from Brockenhurst to Ringwood completely and the section from Ringwood to Broadstone to passengers only.

== Locations ==
- Salisbury; LSWR main line station; opened 2 May 1859; still open;
- Alderbury Junction; opened February 1872 for exchange purposes and railway staff use; divergence from Bishopstoke line; staff wives going to market; closed 4 May 1964;
- Downton; opened 20 December 1866; closed 4 May 1964;
- Breamore; opened 20 December 1866; closed 4 May 1964;
- Fordingbridge; opened 20 December 1866; closed 4 May 1964;
- Alderholt; opened 1 January 1876; renamed Daggens Road 1 May 1876; renamed 1903/4; closed 4 May 1964;
- Verwood; opened 20 December 1866; closed 4 May 1964;
- West Moors; opened 1 August 1867; closed 4 May 1964.
