= Dorset Council elections =

Local government elections in Dorset, England

Dorset Council is the local authority for the unitary authority of Dorset in England. There are 82 councillors, elected every five years until 2029, after which elections will be held every four years.

== Political control ==
The council was created on 1 April 2019, when Dorset County Council and five of its six district councils merged to form a unitary authority. A "shadow authority" was created in 2018 to oversee the transition, comprising all the existing district and county councillors representing the area of the new authority. The first election to the new council was held in May 2019. Political control of the council has been held by the following parties:

Party in control	Years
Conservative	2019–2024
Liberal Democrats	2024–present

=== Leadership ===
During the shadow period 2018–2019, Rebecca Knox, Conservative leader of the outgoing Dorset County Council served as leader of the shadow authority. At the first formal meeting of the new Dorset Council after its elections, Spencer Flower was appointed leader of the council. He had been the last leader of the former East Dorset District Council.

Councillor	Party	From	To
Spencer Flower	Conservative	16 May 2019	16 May 2024
Nick Ireland	Liberal Democrats	16 May 2024	

== Council elections ==
Year	Conservative	Liberal Democrats	Green	Independent	IfD	Labour	Council control after election
Council established from the merger of East Dorset, North Dorset, Purbeck, West Dorset and Weymouth & Portland (82 seats)
2019	43	29	4	4	0	2	Conservative
2024	30	42	4	1	3	2	Liberal Democrats

The next election is due in 2029, five years after the 2024 elections. After the 2029 elections have been held, elections will revert back to being held in every fourth year.

== District result maps ==
2019 results map

2024 results map

== By-election results ==
=== 2019–2024 ===
Lyme and Charmouth by-election 7 April 2022
Party	Candidate	Votes	%	±%
Green	Belinda Bawden	594	43.8	+27.0
Conservative	Vicci Stocqueler	359	26.5	−13.6
Independent	Cheryl Reynolds	320	23.6	−6.7
Labour	David Hart	82	6.1	−6.6
Majority		235	17.3	
Turnout		1,355		
Green gain from Conservative		Swing		

Sherborne West by-election 29 June 2023
Party	Candidate	Votes	%	±%
Liberal Democrats	Richard Crabb	589	50.8	−2.8
Conservative	Becky Burns	489	42.2	+4.2
Labour	Nick Boothroyd	81	7.0	+7.0
Majority		100	8.6	
Turnout		1,159		
Liberal Democrats hold		Swing		

Littlemoor and Preston by-election 11 January 2024
Party	Candidate	Votes	%	±%
Conservative	Peter Dickenson	1,237	53.7	+24.3
Liberal Democrats	Simon Clifford	833	36.2	+19.1
Labour	Stephen Brown	232	10.1	−9.5
Majority		404	17.5	
Turnout		2,302		
Conservative hold		Swing		

=== 2024–2028 ===
Swanage by-election 24 July 2025
Party	Candidate	Votes	%	±%
Conservative	Chris Tomes	1,254	35.3	
Reform	John Lejeune	748	21.0	
Liberal Democrats	Poppy Maltby	737	20.7	
IfD	Philip Eades	415	11.7	
Labour	Gemma Simmons	400	11.3	
Majority		506	14.2	
Turnout		3,554		
Conservative hold		Swing		

Bridport by-election 21 May 2026
Party	Candidate	Votes	%	±%
Liberal Democrats	Paddy Mooney	2,190	43.6	+2.1
Reform	Jason Holt	1,164	23.2	+23.2
Green	Kelvin Clayton	1,011	20.1	–17.5
Conservative	Una Christopher	656	13.1	–6.9
Majority		1,026	20.4	
Turnout		5,038		
Liberal Democrats hold				

St Leonards and St Ives by-election 2 July 2026
Party	Candidate	Votes	%	±%
Conservative	Margaret Goringe	928	37.9	–25.0
Reform	Jason Holt	823	33.6	+33.6
Liberal Democrats	Andrew Barham	629	25.7	–11.4
Green	Mark Keith	68	2.8	+2.8
Majority		105	4.3	
Turnout		2,448		
Conservative hold				
