= Blackmore Vale (Dorset ward) =

Electoral ward in Dorset, England

- ward Dorset Council
- Population: 4,549
- Major settlements: Blackmore Vale

Current ward
- Created: 2019
- Councillor: Stephen Murcer (Conservative)
- Number of councillors: 1

Blackmore Vale is an electoral ward in Dorset, England. Since the 2019 Dorset Council election, it has elected one councillor to Dorset Council.

== Geography ==
The Blackmore Vale ward is in rural north Dorset, and contains the civil parishes of Fifehead Neville, Hazelbury Bryan, Ibberton, Lydlinch, Mappowder, Okeford Fitzpaine, Pulham, Shillingstone, Stoke Wake and Woolland.

It is named after the Blackmore Vale, but contains only a part of the vale, other parts of which are covered by the Beacon, Gillingham, Hill Forts and Upper Tarrants, Stalbridge and Marnhull and Sturminster Newton wards.

== Councillors ==
Election	Councillors
2019	Pauline Hannah Batstone (Conservative)
2024	Stephen Murcer (Conservative)

== Election ==
=== 2024 Dorset Council election ===
2024 Dorset Council election: Blackmore Vale (1 seat)
Party	Candidate	Votes	%	±%
Conservative	Stephen Murcer	637	50.3	−11.5
Liberal Democrats	Ian Philip Suter	468	37.0	+22.4
Green	Vicki Elcoate	161	12.7	New
Turnout		1,266	35.09	
Conservative hold		Swing		

=== 2019 Dorset Council election ===
2019 Dorset Council election: Blackmore Vale (1 seat)
Party	Candidate	Votes	%	±%
Conservative	Pauline Hannah Batstone	912	61.8	
UKIP	Bill Woodhouse	224	15.2	
Liberal Democrats	Ian De Carteret Edlin	215	14.6	
Labour	Kevin Thomas James Shillington	124	8.4	
Majority		688	45.3	
Turnout			40.70	
Conservative win (new seat)				

== See also ==
- List of electoral wards in Dorset
