= Cranborne Chase (ward) =

Electoral ward in Dorset, England

- ward Dorset Council
- Population: 5,024
- Major settlements: Cranborne Chase

Current ward
- Created: 2019
- Councillor: Piers Brown (Conservative)
- Number of councillors: 1

Cranborne Chase is an electoral ward in Dorset, England. Since the 2019 Dorset Council election, it has elected one councillor to Dorset Council.

== Geography ==
The Cranborne Chase ward is rural and covers the civil parishes of Crichel, Gussage All Saints, Gussage St Michael, Langton Long Blandford, Sixpenny Handley and Pentridge, Tarrant Crawford, Tarrant Keyneston, Tarrant Launceston, Tarrant Monkton, Tarrant Rushton and Witchampton.

The ward is named after the Cranborne Chase chalk plateau, but does not cover the entirety of the plateau, which straddles the borders of Hampshire and Wiltshire as well as the neighbouring Dorset electoral wards of Beacon, Cranborne and Alderholt and Hill Forts and Upper Tarrants.

== Councillors ==
| Election | Councillors |
|---|---|
| 2019 | Piers Brown (Conservative) |
| 2024 | Piers Brown (Conservative) |

== Election ==
=== 2019 Dorset Council election ===
2019 Dorset Council election: Cranborne Chase (1 seat)
| Party | Candidate | Votes | % | ±% |
|---|---|---|---|---|
| Conservative | Piers Brown | 778 | 65.6 | |
| Labour | Dennis Wardleworth | 208 | 17.5 | |
| UKIP | Stephen Mark Kelly | 200 | 16.9 | |
| Majority | | | | |
| Turnout | | | 36.70 | |
| Conservative win (new seat) | | | | |

=== 2024 Dorset Council election ===
2024 Dorset Council election: Cranborne Chase (1 seat)
| Party | Candidate | Votes | % | ±% |
|---|---|---|---|---|
| Conservative | Piers Brown* | 634 | 65.4 | −0.2 |
| Liberal Democrats | Tom Harding | 194 | 20.0 | New |
| Labour | Louise Claire Cooper | 142 | 14.6 | −2.9 |
| Turnout | | 970 | 30.24 | |
| Conservative hold | | Swing | | |

== See also ==
- List of electoral wards in Dorset
