= Furzehill, Dorset =

Coordinates: 50.818889°N 1.978889°W

Furzehill
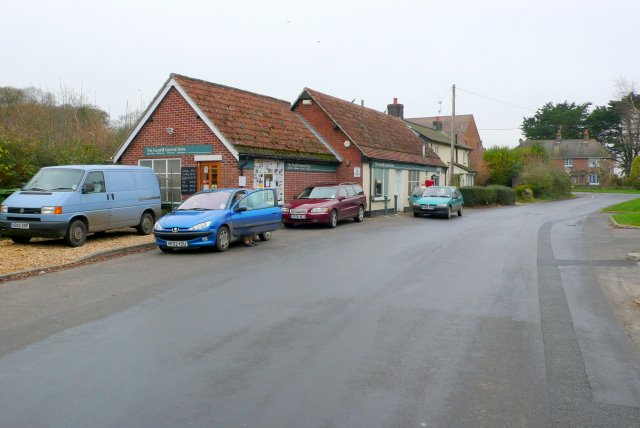
- Village stores at Furzehill

- Location within Dorset
- Population: 763 (2021 Census)
- Civil parish: Holt
- Unitary authority: Dorset
- Ceremonial county: Dorset
- Region: South West
- Country: England
- Sovereign state: United Kingdom
- Post town: BOURNEMOUTH
- Postcode district: BH21
- Police: Dorset
- Fire: Dorset and Wiltshire
- Ambulance: South Western
- UK Parliament: Mid Dorset and North Poole

Furzehill is a village in the civil parish of Holt, in Dorset, England. In 2021 it had a population of 763.

== History ==
In 1982, a local landowner gifted land to the Woodland Trust to manage the Furzehill Wood. In 2023, Dorset Council announced their plans to sell the old District Council office site in Furzehill.

== Politics ==
For UK general elections, Furzehill is part of the Mid Dorset and North Poole constituency.

Locally, Furzehill is divided by two wards: Colehill and Wimborne Minster East and Stour and Allen Vale for elections to Dorset Council.
