= Sherborne Rural =

Electoral ward in Dorset, England

- ward Dorset Council
- Population: 5,141
- Major settlements: Bishop's Caundle

Current ward
- Created: 2019
- Councillor: Robin Legg (Liberal Democrat)
- Number of councillors: 1

Sherborne Rural is an electoral ward in Dorset. Since 2019, the ward has elected 1 councillor to Dorset Council.

== Geography ==
The Sherborne Rural ward covers a rural area outside the town of Sherborne. It is composed of the civil parishes of Beer Hackett, Bishop's Caundle, Bradford Abbas, Caundle Marsh, Clifton Maybank, Folke (including Alweston), Glanvilles Wootton, Goathill, Haydon, Holwell, Nether Compton, North Wootton, Oborne, Over Compton, Poyntington, Purse Caundle, Sandford Orcas, Thornford and Trent. It does not include any of the parish of Sherborne, which is in the Sherborne East and Sherborne West wards.

== Councillors ==
Election	Councillors
2019	Robin Legg (Liberal Democrat)
2024	Robin Legg (Liberal Democrat)

== Election ==
=== 2019 Dorset Council election ===
Sherborne Rural
Party	Candidate	Votes	%	±%
Liberal Democrats	Robin Andrew Shane Legg	902	53.4	
Conservative	Peter Robert Shorland	583	34.5	
UKIP	Leon Jennings	204	12.1	
Majority				
Turnout			42.70	
Liberal Democrats win (new seat)				

=== 2024 Dorset Council election ===
Sherborne Rural
Party	Candidate	Votes	%	±%
Liberal Democrats	Robin Andrew Shane Legg *	916	60.3	+6.9
Conservative	Stephen Hillier	604	39.7	+5.2
Majority		312	20.5	
Registered electors		4,036		
Turnout		1,520	38.11	–4.59
Liberal Democrats hold		Swing	+0.9	

== See also ==
- List of electoral wards in Dorset
