= East Compton =

East Compton may refer to:

- East Compton, California, USA
- East Compton, Dorset, England
- East Compton, Somerset, England
