= Holt Heath =

Holt Heath may refer to:

- Holt Heath, Dorset, a common near the village of Holt in east Dorset, southern England
- Holt Heath, Worcestershire, a village in the parish of Holt, near the west bank of the River Severn in Worcestershire, England
