= Mannington, Dorset =

Hamlet in Dorset, England

Coordinates: 50.85258°N 1.91329°W

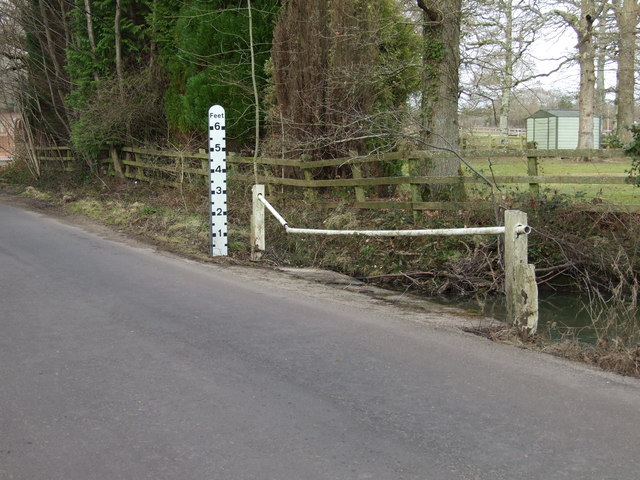
Ford at Mannington

Mannington and its southerly neighbour Lower Mannington are hamlets in the English county of Dorset. They are located within Holt parish 2.5 miles (4 km) north of Ferndown and 2.5 miles (4 km) south-east of Verwood. The village is home to a large electricity substation on the National Grid 400kV transmission network.

== Governance ==
In the UK national parliament, Holt is within the North Dorset parliamentary constituency.

After 2019 structural changes to local government in England, Holt is part of the Stour and Allen Vale ward which elects 1 member to Dorset Council.
