= Shaftesbury (disambiguation) =

Shaftesbury is a town in Dorset, England

Shaftesbury may also refer to:

== Businesses and organisations ==
- Shaftesbury plc, a British real estate investment trust
- Shaftesbury (production company), a Canadian media production company
- Shaftesbury High School, in Winnipeg, Manitoba, Canada
- Shaftesbury School, in Dorset, England

== Places ==
- Shaftesbury (constituency), a former parliamentary constituency in Dorset, England
- Shaftesbury Town (ward), Dorset, England
- Shaftesbury, Newport, Wales
- Shaftesbury, Belfast, Northern Ireland
- Shaftesbury Settlement, Alberta, Canada

== Other uses ==
- Shaftesbury Theatre, in London
- Shaftesbury, a British merchant ship sunk by Wolfpack Hai in 1942
- Earl of Shaftesbury, a title in the peerage of England

== See also ==
- Shaftsbury, Vermont
