= Upwey and Broadwey (ward) =

Electoral ward in Dorset, England

- ward Dorset Council
- Population: 4,518
- Major settlements: Compton Abbas

Current ward
- Created: 2019
- Councillor: David James Northam (Liberal Democrat)
- Number of councillors: 1

Upwey and Broadwey is an electoral ward in Dorset. Since 2019, the ward has elected 1 councillor to Dorset Council.

== Geography ==
The ward is named after the Weymouth suburbs of Upwey and Broadwey.

== Councillors ==
Election	Councillors
2019	Howard Legg (Liberal Democrat)
2024	David James Northam (Liberal Democrat)

== Election ==
=== 2019 Dorset Council election ===
2019 Dorset Council election: Upwey and Broadwey (1 seat)
Party	Candidate	Votes	%	±%
Liberal Democrats	Howard Richard Legg	555	41.1	
Conservative	Kevin Brookes	543	40.3	
Labour	Debra Kohana	251	18.6	
Majority				
Turnout			37.00	
Liberal Democrats win (new seat)				

=== 2024 Dorset Council election ===
Upwey and Broadwey
Party	Candidate	Votes	%	±%
Liberal Democrats	David James Northam	710	55.9	+14.8
Conservative	Jan Edward Ernest Bergman	317	25.0	−15.3
Labour	Byron Silver	242	19.1	+0.5
Turnout		1,269	34.04	
Liberal Democrats hold		Swing		

== See also ==
- List of electoral wards in Dorset
