= West Moors and Three Legged Cross =

Electoral ward in Dorset, England

- ward Dorset Council
- Population: 9,101
- Major settlements: Compton Abbas

Current ward
- Created: 2019
- Councillor: David Shortell (Conservative)
- Councillor: Andy Skeats (Conservative)
- Number of councillors: 2

West Moors and Three Legged Cross is an electoral ward in Dorset. Since 2019, the ward has elected 2 councillors to Dorset Council.

== Geography ==
The ward contains the villages of West Moors and Three Legged Cross.

== Councillors ==
Election	Councillors	
2019	David Shortell (Conservative)	Mike Dyer (Conservative)
2024	David Shortell (Conservative)	Andy Skeats (Conservative)

== Election ==
=== 2019 Dorset Council election ===
2019 Dorset Council election: West Moors and Three Legged Cross (2 seats)
Party	Candidate	Votes	%	±%
Conservative	David William Shortell	1,412	57.3	
Conservative	Michael Roy Dyer	1,323	53.7	
UKIP	David Richard Marshall	596	24.2	
Liberal Democrats	Marlies Koutstaal	541	22.0	
UKIP	Mark Wadeson	447	18.1	
Liberal Democrats	Lars Wilmar	432	17.5	
Majority				
Turnout		2,463	33.35	
Conservative win (new seat)				
Conservative win (new seat)				

=== 2024 Dorset Council election ===
2019 Dorset Council election: West Moors and Three Legged Cross (2 seats)
Party	Candidate	Votes	%	±%
Conservative	David Shortell*	1,056	50.3	−7.0
Conservative	Andy Skeats	1,054	50.2	−3.5
Liberal Democrats	Sally Christine Walls	713	34.0	+12.0
Liberal Democrats	Peter Durant	671	32.0	+14.5
Independent	Malcolm John Hobbs	273	13.0	New
Independent	Steven Anzinger-Cooper	239	11.4	New
Turnout		2,100	28.59	−4.76
Conservative hold		Swing	▼9.6	
Conservative hold		Swing	▼9.1	

== See also ==
- List of electoral wards in Dorset
