= Mannington =

Mannington may refer to:

- Mannington, Dorset, England
- Mannington, Kentucky, United States
- Mannington, Norfolk, England, the location of Mannington Hall
- Mannington Township, New Jersey, in Salem County, United States
- Mannington, West Virginia, a city in Marion County, United States

== See also ==
- Mannington Creek, in New Jersey
