= Wimborne Minster (ward) =

Electoral ward in Dorset, England

- ward Dorset Council
- Population: 7,385
- Major settlements: Wimborne Minster

Current ward
- Created: 2019
- Councillor: Shane Bartlett (Liberal Democrats)
- Councillor: David Martin (Liberal Democrats)
- Number of councillors: 2
- UK Parliament constituency: Mid Dorset and North Poole

Wimborne Minster is an electoral ward in Dorset. Since 2019, the ward has elected 2 councillors to Dorset Council.

== Geography ==
The ward covers the majority of Wimborne Minster. The rest of the town is part of Colehill and Wimborne Minster East.

== Councillors ==
Election	Councillors	
2019	Shane Bartlett (Liberal Democrats)	David Morgan (Liberal Democrats)
2024	Shane Bartlett (Liberal Democrats)	David Morgan (Liberal Democrats)

== Election ==
=== 2019 Dorset Council election ===
Wimborne Minster (2 seats)
Party	Candidate	Votes	%	±%
Liberal Democrats	Shane Kevin Bartlett	1,296	65.5	
Liberal Democrats	David Morgan	1,155	58.4	
Conservative	Derek Bidkar Frank Burt	514	26.0	
Conservative	Colin Robin William Beck	509	25.7	
Labour	Stewart William Bullen	192	9.7	
Labour	Ashley Wynne Rowlands	182	9.2	
Majority				
Turnout		1,979	36.42	
Liberal Democrats win (new seat)				
Liberal Democrats win (new seat)				

=== 2024 Dorset Council election ===
Wimborne Minster
Party	Candidate	Votes	%	±%
Liberal Democrats	Shane Bartlett*	1,161	62.3	−3.2
Liberal Democrats	David Morgan*	1,067	57.2	−1.2
Conservative	Sue Cook	493	26.4	+0.4
Conservative	Mike Bartlett	451	24.2	−1.5
Labour	Ashley Wynne Rowlands	283	15.2	+6.0
Rejected ballots		13	0.69	
Turnout		1,864	29.76	−6.66
Registered electors		6,307		
Liberal Democrats hold		Swing	▼2.0	
Liberal Democrats hold		Swing	▲0.1	

== See also ==
- List of electoral wards in Dorset
