= Ferndown South (ward) =

Electoral ward in Dorset, England

- ward Dorset Council
- Population: 9,011
- Major settlements: Ferndown

Current ward
- Created: 2019
- Councillor: Hannah Hobbs-Chell (Independent)
- Councillor: Julie Robinson (Conservative)
- Number of councillors: 2

Ferndown South is an electoral ward in Dorset. Since 2019, the ward has elected 2 councillors to Dorset Council.

== Geography ==
The Ferndown South ward is rural and contains the southern areas of Ferndown.

== Councillors ==
Election	Councillors	
2019	Rod Adkins (Conservative Party)	Julie Robinson (Conservative Party)
2024	Hannah Hobbs-Chell (Independent)	Julie Robinson (Conservative Party)

== Election ==
=== 2019 Dorset Council election ===
2019 Dorset Council election: Ferndown South (2 seats)
Party	Candidate	Votes	%	±%
Conservative	Julie Lorraine Robinson	765	38.9	
Conservative	Rod Adkins	689	35.0	
UKIP	Geoff Laidlaw	536	27.3	
UKIP	Lawrence Wilson	487	24.8	
Liberal Democrats	Philip Carl Bamborough	474	24.1	
Independent	Paul Hanson Graham	371	18.9	
Labour	Suzanne M Roffe	264	13.4	
Majority				
Turnout		1,966	29.83	
Conservative win (new seat)				
Conservative win (new seat)				

=== 2024 Dorset Council election ===
2024 Dorset Council election: Ferndown South (2 seats)
Party	Candidate	Votes	%	±%
Conservative	Julie Lorraine Robinson*	684	38.6	−0.3
Independent	Hannah Hobbs-Chell	621	35.0	New
Conservative	George Phillips	602	34.0	−1.0
Independent	Lawrence Leslie Ralph Wilson	556	31.4	+6.6
Independent	Paul Hanson Graham	367	20.7	+1.8
Liberal Democrats	Susan Jefferies	276	15.6	−8.5
Liberal Democrats	Ross Alexander Bowell	270	15.2	New
Turnout		1,773	26.45	
Conservative hold		Swing		
Independent gain from Conservative		Swing		

== See also ==
- List of electoral wards in Dorset
