= Compton Abbas Airfield =

Airport in Dorset, England

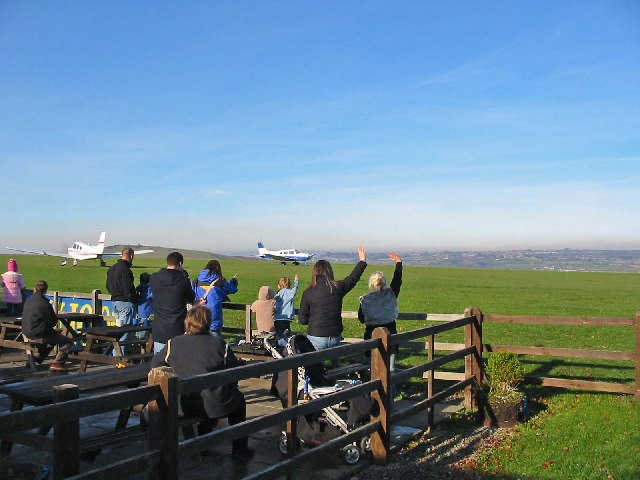
- Spectators outside the clubhouse
- IATA: none; ICAO: EGHA

Summary
- Airport type: Private
- Owner: Guy Ritchie
- Operator: Ashcombe Estates Ltd
- Serves: Shaftesbury
- Location: Compton Abbas
- Elevation AMSL: 811 ft (247 m)
- Coordinates: 50°58′02″N 002°09′13″W
- Website: www.comptonairfield.com

Map
- Location in Dorset

Runways
| Direction | Length | | Surface |
| Direction | m | ft | Surface |
|---|---|---|---|
| 08/26 | 803 | 2,635 | Grass |
- Sources: UK AIP at NATS

Compton Abbas Airfield (IATA: n/a, ICAO: EGHA) is a grass airstrip 3 miles (4.8 kilometres) south of Shaftesbury, Dorset, England.

Compton Abbas Aerodrome has a CAA Ordinary Licence (Number P851) that allows flights for the public transport of passengers or for flying instruction as authorised by the licensee. The aerodrome is not licensed for night use.

It was from this airfield in May 1993 that tycoon Asil Nadir flew to France in a six-seater Piper Seneca as he fled to Northern Cyprus.

The airfield is owned and managed by film director Guy Ritchie, who also owns the neighbouring Ashcombe Estate. Ritchie took over the running of the airfield in February 2023 after acquiring it from the Hughes family, who had managed it for 35 years.

The airfield is also used by Aero Legends which provide Supermarine Spitfire experiences, as well as a flight training facility, with multiple instructors.

The airfield hosts a weekly parkrun event, this began on 22nd August 2026.
