= Chalk Valleys (ward) =

Electoral ward in Dorset, England

- ward Dorset Council
- Population: 4,846
- Major settlements: Piddlehinton

Current ward
- Created: 2019
- Councillor: Jill Haynes (Conservative)
- Number of councillors: 1

Chalk Valleys is an electoral ward in Dorset. Since 2019, the ward has elected 1 councillor to Dorset Council.

== Geography ==
The Chalk Valleys ward is rural area between Dorchester and Sherborne and contains the villages of Alton Pancras, Buckland Newton, Cerne Abbas, Duntish, Higher Ansty and Piddlehinton.

== Councillors ==
Election	Councillors
2019	Jill Haynes (Conservative)
2024	Jill Haynes (Conservative)

== Election ==
=== 2024 Dorset Council election ===
2024 Dorset Council election: Chalk Valleys (1 seat)
Party	Candidate	Votes	%	±%
Conservative	Jill Haynes	683	48.0	−2.4
Liberal Democrats	Iain Douglas Young	554	38.9	+17.1
Labour	John Bennett	186	13.1	New
Turnout		1,423	36.99	
Conservative hold		Swing		

=== 2019 Dorset Council election ===
2019 Dorset Council election: Chalk Valleys (1 seat)
Party	Candidate	Votes	%	±%
Conservative	Jill Haynes	810	50.4	
Green	Carol Rosemary Byrom	447	27.8	
Liberal Democrats	Michael John Sandy	351	21.8	
Majority		363	22.6	
Turnout			42.30	
Conservative win (new seat)				

== See also ==
- List of electoral wards in Dorset
