= Beaminster (ward) =

Electoral ward in Dorset, England

- ward Dorset Council
- Population: 4,001
- Major settlements: Beaminster

Current ward
- Created: 2019
- Councillor: Craig Monks (Conservative)
- Number of councillors: 1

Beaminster is an electoral ward in Dorset. Since 2019, the ward has elected 1 councillor to Dorset Council.

== Geography ==
The Beaminster ward covers the town of Beaminster.

== Councillors ==
| Election | Councillors |
|---|---|
| 2019 | Rebecca Knox (Conservative) |
| 2024 | Craig Monks (Conservative) |

== Election ==
=== 2024 Dorset Council election ===
2024 Dorset Council election: Beaminster (1 seat)
| Party | Candidate | Votes | % | ±% |
|---|---|---|---|---|
| Conservative | Craig Monks | 601 | 42.9 | −4.8 |
| Liberal Democrats | Paul David Fitzpatrick | 579 | 41.3 | +3.7 |
| Labour | Julie Cook | 70 | 5.0 | +0.5 |
| Reform UK | Yvonne Harris | 69 | 4.9 | New |
| Green | Andy McEwen | 65 | 4.6 | −5.4 |
| Independent | Richard Thomas Gunning | 17 | 1.2 | New |
| Turnout | | 1,401 | 40.33 | |
| Conservative hold | | Swing | | |

=== 2019 Dorset Council election ===
2019 Dorset Council election: Beaminster (1 seat)
| Party | Candidate | Votes | % | ±% |
|---|---|---|---|---|
| Conservative | Rebecca Knox | 678 | 47.9 | |
| Liberal Democrats | Chris Turner | 532 | 37.6 | |
| Green | Robert Sean Casey | 141 | 10.0 | |
| Labour | Stephen Everington | 63 | 4.5 | |
| Majority | | 146 | 10.3 | |
| Turnout | | | 42.10 | |
| Conservative win (new seat) | | | | |

== See also ==
- List of electoral wards in Dorset
