= Winterborne North (ward) =

Electoral ward in Dorset, England

- ward Dorset Council
- Population: 4,072
- Major settlements: Charlton Marshall, Winterborne Stickland

Current ward
- Created: 2019
- Councillor: Barry Cooper ((Liberal Democrats)
- Number of councillors: 1

Winterborne North is an electoral ward in Dorset. Since 2019, the ward has elected 1 councillor to Dorset Council.

== Geography ==
The ward is rural and is located in upper Winterborne valley covering the villages of Charlton Marshall and Winterborne Stickland.

== Councillors ==
Election	Councillors
2019	Andrew Kerby (Conservative)
2024	Barry Cooper (Liberal Democrats)

== Elections ==
=== 2019 Dorset Council election ===
Winterborne North
Party	Candidate	Votes	%	±%
Conservative	Andrew Kerby	557	39.9	
Liberal Democrats	Barrie Cooper	363	26.0	
UKIP	Christine Adey	162	11.6	
Independent	James Bernard Mayo	105	7.5	
Labour	Haydn Roger White	102	7.3	
Independent	John Stayt	88	6.3	
Independent	Jason Williamson	19	1.4	
Majority				
Turnout			41.90	
Conservative win (new seat)				

=== 2024 Dorset Council election ===
Winterborne North
Party	Candidate	Votes	%	±%
Liberal Democrats	Barrie George Cooper	663	54.6	+28.6
Conservative	Steve O'Connell	444	36.6	−3.3
Labour	Haydn White	107	8.8	+1.5
Rejected ballots		23	1.85	
Turnout		1,214	32.84	−9.06
Registered electors		3,776		
Liberal Democrats gain from Conservative		Swing	▲15.8	

== See also ==
- List of electoral wards in Dorset
