= West Parley (ward) =

Electoral ward in Dorset, England

- ward Dorset Council
- Population: 3,561
- Major settlements: West Parley

Current ward
- Created: 2019
- Councillor: Andrew Parry (Conservative)
- Number of councillors: 1

West Parley is an electoral ward in Dorset. Since 2019, the ward has elected 1 councillor to Dorset Council.

== Geography ==
The ward is rural and contains the village of West Parley.

== Councillors ==
Election	Councillors
2019	Andrew Parry (Conservative)
2024	Andrew Parry (Conservative)

== Election ==
=== 2019 Dorset Council election ===
2019 Dorset Council election: West Parley (1 seat)
Party	Candidate	Votes	%	±%
Conservative	Andrew Charles Parry	611	62.5	
UKIP	Ann Josephine Miller	201	20.6	
Liberal Democrats	Jocelyn Grace Lortie	165	16.9	
Majority				
Turnout			32.10	
Conservative win (new seat)				

=== 2024 Dorset Council election ===
West Parley
Party	Candidate	Votes	%	±%
Conservative	Andrew Charles Parry*	564	66.0	+3.5
Independent	Ann Josephine Miller	152	17.8	−2.8
Liberal Democrats	Marlies Koutstaal	139	16.3	−0.6
Turnout		855	28.70	−3.4
Conservative hold		Swing	▲1.9	

== See also ==
- List of electoral wards in Dorset
