= Verwood (ward) =

Electoral ward in Dorset, England

- ward Dorset Council
- Population: 13,724
- Major settlements: Verwood

Current ward
- Created: 2019
- Councillor: Simon Gibson (Conservative)
- Councillor: Toni Coombs (Conservative)
- Councillor: Spencer Flower (Conservative)
- Number of councillors: 3

Verwood is an electoral ward in Dorset. Since 2019, the ward has elected 3 councillors to Dorset Council.

== Geography ==
The Verwood ward is based on the town of Verwood, but stretches to contain Ebblake in the east.

== Councillors ==
Election	Councillors		
2019	Simon Gibson (Conservative)	Toni Coombs (Conservative)	Spencer Flower (Conservative)
2024	Simon Gibson (Conservative)	Toni Coombs (Conservative)	Spencer Flower (Conservative)

== Election ==
=== 2024 Dorset Council election ===
Verwood
Party	Candidate	Votes	%	±%
Conservative	Simon Gibson*	2,006	64.3	+0.7
Conservative	Toni Bartley Coombs*	1,918	61.5	+2.3
Conservative	Spencer Grant Flower*	1,765	56.6	+1.3
Liberal Democrats	Lindsey Dedden	857	27.5	New
Liberal Democrats	Ted Mason	707	22.7	New
Liberal Democrats	Ginette Marie Holdroyd	579	18.6	+2.5
Labour	Sandra Turner	487	15.6	+9.1
UKIP	John Baxter	220	7.1	−7.1
Turnout		3,118	28.91	
Conservative hold		Swing		
Conservative hold		Swing		
Conservative hold		Swing		

=== 2019 Dorset Council election ===
Verwood (3 seats)
Party	Candidate	Votes	%	±%
Conservative	Simon Gibson	2,235	63.6	
Conservative	Toni Bartley Coombs	2,083	59.2	
Conservative	Spencer Grant Flower	1,946	55.3	
Green	Bridie Salmon	736	20.9	
Liberal Democrats	Ginette Marie Holdroyd	565	16.1	
Green	Peter Jonathan Lucas	546	15.5	
UKIP	John Baxter	499	14.2	
UKIP	Peter Grant	480	13.7	
Labour	James Andrew McKenzie	306	8.7	
Labour	Maryanne Pike	228	6.5	
Labour	Sandra Joy Turner	227	6.5	
Majority				
Turnout		3,516	33.60	
Conservative win (new seat)				
Conservative win (new seat)				
Conservative win (new seat)				

== See also ==
- List of electoral wards in Dorset
