= Ferndown North (ward) =

Electoral ward in Dorset, England

- ward Dorset Council
- Population: 8,916
- Major settlements: Ferndown

Current ward
- Created: 2019
- Councillor: Cathy Lugg (Conservative)
- Councillor: Mike Parkes (Conservative)
- Number of councillors: 2

Ferndown North is an electoral ward in Dorset. Since 2019, the ward has elected 2 councillors to Dorset Council.

== Geography ==
The Ferndown North ward is rural and contains the northern areas of Ferndown.

== Councillors ==
Election	Councillors	
2019	Cathy Lugg (Conservative Party)	Mike Parkes (Conservative Party)
2024	Cathy Lugg (Conservative Party)	Mike Parkes (Conservative Party)

== Election ==
=== 2019 Dorset Council election ===
2019 Dorset Council election: Ferndown North (2 seats)
Party	Candidate	Votes	%	±%
Conservative	Cathy Lugg	1,312	54.1	
Conservative	Mike Parkes	1,221	50.3	
Liberal Democrats	Matthew Coussell	578	23.8	
Liberal Democrats	Peter Durant	545	22.5	
UKIP	Alan Albert Miller	521	21.5	
UKIP	Jade Cadman	492	20.3	
Majority				
Turnout		2,426	33.40	
Conservative win (new seat)				
Conservative win (new seat)				

=== 2024 Dorset Council election ===
2024 Dorset Council election: Ferndown North (2 seats)
Party	Candidate	Votes	%	±%
Conservative	Cathy Lugg*	955	44.3	−9.8
Conservative	Mike Parkes*	794	36.8	−13.3
Independent	Simon Lee Cable	781	36.2	New
Independent	Philip Leach	753	34.9	New
Liberal Democrats	Michael Adrian Clements	304	14.1	−9.7
Reform UK	Andrei Silviu Dragotoniu	232	10.8	New
Liberal Democrats	Esbjörn Roderick Wilmar	228	10.6	−11.9
Turnout		2,156	29.62	
Conservative hold		Swing		
Conservative hold		Swing		

== See also ==
- List of electoral wards in Dorset
