= Wareham (ward) =

Electoral ward in Dorset, England

- ward Dorset Council
- Population: 8,985
- Major settlements: Wareham

Current ward
- Created: 2019
- Councillor: Beryl Ezzard (Liberal Democrats)
- Councillor: Ryan Holloway (Liberal Democrats)
- Number of councillors: 2

Wareham is an electoral ward in Dorset. Since 2019, the ward has elected 2 councillors to Dorset Council.

== Geography ==
The Wareham ward covers the town of the same name.

== Councillors ==
Election	Councillors	
2019	Beryl Ezzard (Liberal Democrats)	Ryan Holloway (Liberal Democrats)
2024	Beryl Ezzard (Liberal Democrats)	Ryan Holloway (Liberal Democrats)

== Election ==
=== 2019 Dorset Council election ===
2019 Dorset Council election: Wareham (2 seats)
Party	Candidate	Votes	%	±%
Liberal Democrats	Beryl Rita Ezzard	1,837	57.1	
Liberal Democrats	Ryan David Holloway	1,308	40.6	
Conservative	Mark Unsworth	965	30.0	
Conservative	Mike Wiggins	942	29.3	
UKIP	Keith Allen Simpson	431	13.4	
Labour	Cherry Ann Bartlett	365	11.3	
Labour	Alice Jane Blachford Rogers	219	6.8	
Majority				
Turnout		3,219	41.16	
Liberal Democrats win (new seat)				
Liberal Democrats win (new seat)				

=== 2024 Dorset Council election ===
2024 Dorset Council election: Wareham (2 seats)
Party	Candidate	Votes	%	±%
Liberal Democrats	Beryl Rita Ezzard*	1,879	68.0	+10.9
Liberal Democrats	Ryan David Holloway*	1,710	61.8	+21.2
Conservative	Jane Newell	632	22.9	−7.1
Conservative	Victoria Stocqueler	617	22.3	−7.0
Labour	David Brian Law	361	13.1	+1.8
Turnout		2,765	35.88	−5.28
Liberal Democrats hold		Swing	▲8.7	
Liberal Democrats hold		Swing	▲13.9	

== See also ==
- List of electoral wards in Dorset
