= Melcombe Regis (ward) =

Electoral ward in Dorset, England

- ward Dorset Council
- Population: 4,247
- Major settlements: Melcombe Regis

Current ward
- Created: 2019
- Councillor: Jon Orrell (Green)
- Number of councillors: 1

Melcombe Regis is an electoral ward in Dorset. Since 2019, the ward has elected 1 councillor to Dorset Council.

== Geography ==
The Melcombe Regis ward is based on the Weymouth suburb of Melcombe Regis.

== Councillors ==
Election	Councillors
2019	Jon Orrell (Green)
2024	Jon Orrell (Green)

== Election ==
=== 2019 Dorset Council election ===
2019 Dorset Council election: Melcombe Regis (1 seat)
Party	Candidate	Votes	%	±%
Green	Jon Orrell	691	62.8	
Conservative	James William Farquharson	220	20.0	
Labour	Tia Roos	190	17.3	
Majority				
Turnout			33.00	
Green win (new seat)				

=== 2024 Dorset Council election ===
Melcombe Regis
Party	Candidate	Votes	%	±%
Green	Jon Orrell*	419	49.2	−13.6
Conservative	Claire Wall	256	30.1	+10.1
Labour	Howard John Atkinson	176	20.7	+3.4
Turnout		851	26.01	
Green hold		Swing		

== See also ==
- List of electoral wards in Dorset
