= West Purbeck =

Electoral ward in Dorset, England

- ward Dorset Council
- Population: 10,308
- Major settlements: Bere Regis, West Lulworth

Current ward
- Created: 2019
- Councillor: Laura Beddow (Conservative)
- Councillor: Michael Baker (Liberal Democrats)
- Number of councillors: 2

West Purbeck is an electoral ward in Dorset. Since 2019, the ward has elected 2 councillors to Dorset Council.

== Geography ==
The ward contains the western parts of the Isle of Purbeck stretching from Bere Regis in the north to West Lulworth in the south.

== Councillors ==
| Election | Councillors | |
|---|---|---|
| 2019 | Laura Beddow (Conservative) | Peter Wharf (Conservative) |
| 2024 | Laura Beddow (Conservative) | Michael Baker (Liberal Democrats) |

== Elections ==
=== 2019 Dorset Council election ===
2019 Dorset Council election: West Purbeck (2 seats)
| Party | Candidate | Votes | % | ±% |
|---|---|---|---|---|
| Conservative | Laura Jane Miller | 1,142 | 44.1 | |
| Conservative | Peter Kendrick Wharf | 1,064 | 41.1 | |
| Independent | Malcolm Leonard Shakesby | 848 | 32.7 | |
| Liberal Democrats | David H Bhattacharjee | 556 | 21.5 | |
| Liberal Democrats | David Sinclair Burden | 375 | 14.5 | |
| Labour | Jon Davey | 307 | 11.8 | |
| Labour | Nick Chaffey | 288 | 11.1 | |
| Majority | | | | |
| Turnout | | 2,591 | 36.59 | |
| Conservative win (new seat) | | | | |
| Conservative win (new seat) | | | | |

=== 2024 Dorset Council election ===
2024 Dorset Council election: West Purbeck (2 seats)
| Party | Candidate | Votes | % | ±% |
|---|---|---|---|---|
| Liberal Democrats | Michael John Baker | 1,245 | 52.3 | +30.8 |
| Conservative | Laura Jane Beddow* | 962 | 40.4 | −3.7 |
| Liberal Democrats | David Graham Civil | 929 | 39.0 | +24.5 |
| Conservative | Peter Kendrick Wharf* | 835 | 35.1 | −6.0 |
| Labour | Peter David Green | 300 | 12.6 | +0.8 |
| Labour | David Peden | 171 | 7.2 | −3.9 |
| Turnout | | 2,380 | 33.41 | +3.18 |
| Liberal Democrats gain from Conservative | | Swing | ▲17.2 | |
| Conservative hold | | Swing | ▼15.3 | |

== See also ==
- List of electoral wards in Dorset
