= West Parley =

Village in Dorset, England

Coordinates: 50.786°N 1.886°W

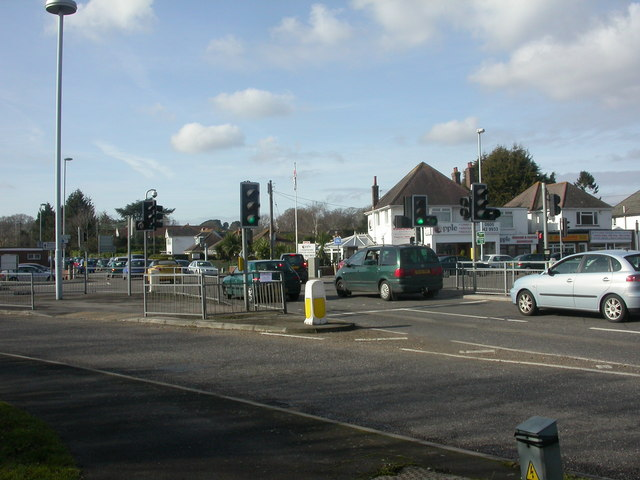
- Parley Cross road junction

- Location within Dorset
- Population: 3,673 (2021 census)
- OS grid reference: SZ081984
- Civil parish: West Parley
- Unitary authority: Dorset
- Ceremonial county: Dorset
- Region: South West
- Country: England
- Sovereign state: United Kingdom
- Post town: Ferndown
- Postcode district: BH22
- Dialling code: 01202
- Police: Dorset
- Fire: Dorset and Wiltshire
- Ambulance: South Western
- UK Parliament: Christchurch

West Parley is a village and civil parish in south-east Dorset, England, situated on the River Stour between Bournemouth and Ferndown and off of the B3073 road. The parish of West Parley covers an area of 4.52 square kilometres (1,120 acres). It is also about 4 miles (6.4 km) to the closest major town of Bournemouth. West Parley has a primary school, a post office, a garden centre and a church. In the 2021 census the parish had a population of 3,673.

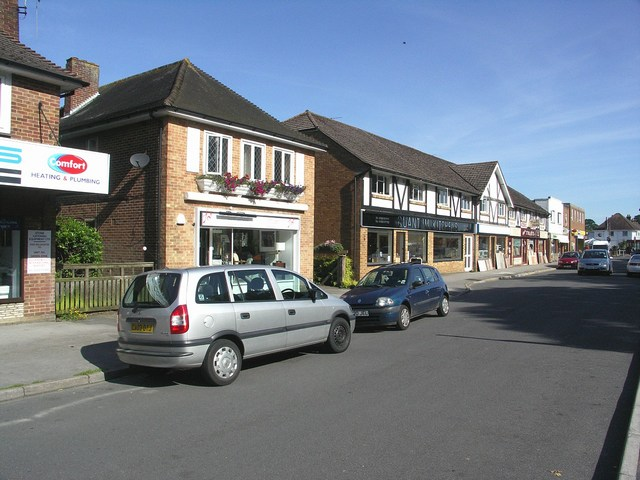
Shops at Parley Cross

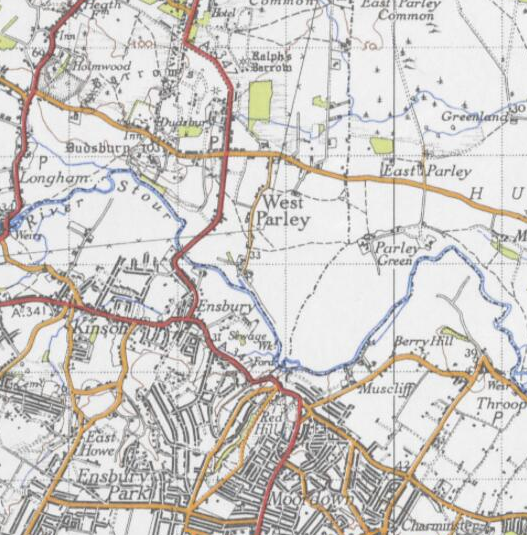
Ordnance Survey map of West Parley in 1945

West Parley has a football team Parley F.C..

== History ==
West Parley is older than both Bournemouth and Ferndown, it features in the Domesday Book when it had 60 inhabitants. At that time it had a Saxon Church, replaced by the present All Saints Church in the 12th century. There is evidence of West Parley being much older as Dudsbury Rings, to the south-west of West Parley is the remains of a hill fort dated to the Iron Age, it can be seen as a defensive site that overlooks the River Stour. The walls of the fort can still be seen today.

In 1870–1872 West Parley was described by John Marius Wilson in the Imperial Gazetteer of England and Wales as

"The living is a rectory in the diocese of Salisbury. The church is ancient; and there is an Independent chapel".

In the 1800s the main source of materials were gravel and clay and these were important in helping build within West Parley, the materials enabled the local community to create tracks that were passable and the clay meant that the workers could use the bricks to build houses within West Parley as well as supplying the city of Bournemouth with bricks for the construction.

On 16 January 2023, a fire broke out in the roof of the West Parley Memorial Hall.

== Governance ==
After 2019 structural changes to local government in England, West Parley is part of the West Parley ward which elects 2 members to Dorset Council.

== Demographics ==
=== Population ===
At the 2021 census, the civil parish had a population of 3,532 people in 1,528 households.

Census population of West Parley parish
Census	Population	Female	Male	Households	Source
1961	2,002				
1971	2,980				
1981	3,610				
1991	3,420				
2001	3,532	1,855	1,677	1,528	
2011	3,585	1,865	1,720	1,562	
2021	3,673	1,871	1,802	1,603	

Over the last 200 years the population of West Parley has changed dramatically, In 1801 the population of West Parley was 180, since then the population has mainly increased, the total population decreased three times since then, once where the population went from 180 in 1801 to 175 in 1811. The second time went from 336 in 1881 to 334 in 1891, the largest increases were during the mid-20th-century baby boom from 1921 to 1951, when the population rose from 1,130 to 2,947.

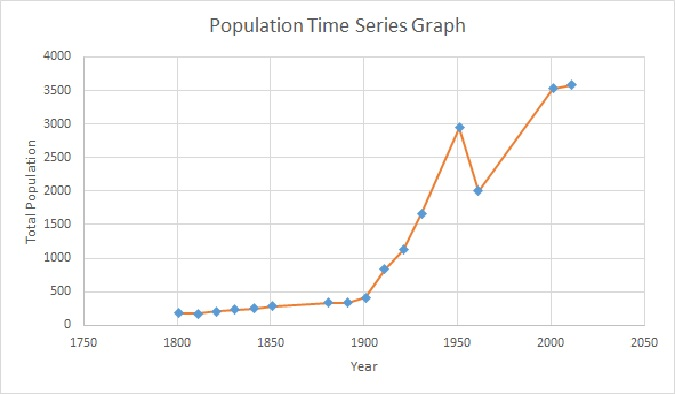
Total Population of West Parley Civil Parish, Dorset as reported by the Census of Population from 1801 to 2011

In 1956, the boundaries of West Parley parish were redrawn to reflect to reflect the growing urbanisation of the area, with part of the parish transferred to Ferndown (then named Hampreston) parish, and another part to the new West Moors parish.

=== Housing ===
In 2011, there was a total of 1,562 households. The largest household had 8 residents and there is only one of these, the majority of the households had 2 people and there is 733 of these households and the second amount is one person per household with 377 people.

=== Age structure ===
Information published by the 2011 census shows that 22.1% of the population was aged between 45 and 59, this means that it is the largest age group in West Parley, the second largest group in the area was 65–79 which equated to 17.1% of the total population, 79.7% of the population are aged 25 and over and the largest age group remaining out of the 20.3% is 10–14 which equates to 4.4% of the total population and so the population of West Parley is an ageing population as there are fewer younger residents.

=== Employment ===
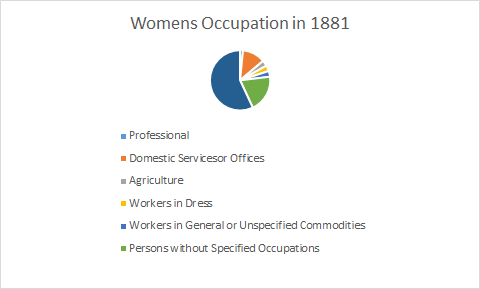
Occupation of women in 1881 shown by the census

In 1881 the main employment for males was agriculture with 45 people, during this era this was the common practice and therefore this is not peculiar, however 37 females had an unknown occupation, the main occupation for females at this date was for domestic services or offices and this only had a total of 8 women which shows the inequality at the time.

According to the 2001 census the number of full-time employees aged 16–74 years of age was 733 people, the number of part-time workers was 316 and the self-employed workers equated to 290 people The main industry of employment was wholesale & retail trade; repair of motor vehicles with 283 people with the second largest being real estate with 170 people. In comparison, the 2011 census shows that there was 758 full-time employees, 408 part-time workers and 335 self-employed people. Wholesale and retail trade was still the main industry of employment in 2011 with 304 people and the second largest was in fact Human health and social work activities with 174 people.

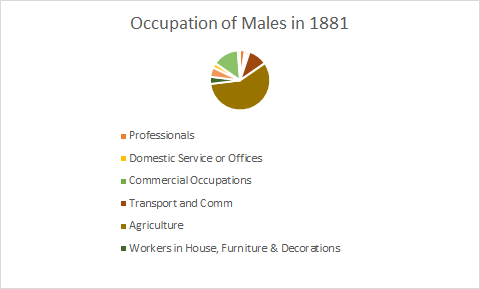
Male occupation in West Parley from the 1881 census

=== Ethnicity ===
In the 2001 census, of the total population of 3,532 the largest ethnicity of West Parley was White British with 3,438 people, this only leaves 94 residents that are not White British, 76 of these residents are also white which means that there are only 18 people of other ethnicities and this means that there is not many different ethnicities such as 5 Chinese and 13 mixed ethnicities in West Parley during 2001. In contrast in the 2011 census there was 3,460 White British out of a total population of 3,585, there are a further 78 white residents leaving 22 mixed race and 22 Asian residents as well 3 other ethnic group, this shows that there has been an increase in ethnic diversity since 2001.
