= Blandford (ward) =

Electoral ward in Dorset, England

- ward Dorset Council
- Population: 10,824
- Major settlements: Blandford Forum

Current ward
- Created: 2019
- Councillor: Byron Robert Quayle (Conservative)
- Councillor: Noc Lacey-Clarke (Conservative)
- Number of councillors: 2

Blandford is an electoral ward in Dorset. Since 2019, the ward has elected 2 councillors to Dorset Council.

== Geography ==
The Blandford ward covers the town of Blandford Forum in north Dorset.

== Councillors ==
Election	Councillors	
2019	Byron Robert Quayle (Conservative)	Noc Lacey-Clarke (Conservative)
2024	Byron Robert Quayle (Conservative)	Noc Lacey-Clarke (Conservative)

== Election ==
=== 2024 Dorset Council election ===
2024 Dorset Council election: Blandford (2 seats)
Party	Candidate	Votes	%	±%
Conservative	Byron Robert Quayle*	1,334	53.9	−1.1
Conservative	Noc Lacey-Clarke*	1,307	52.9	+0.7
Liberal Democrats	Hugo Anthony Mieville	756	30.6	+3.6
Liberal Democrats	David Edwin Orton	556	22.5	−4.1
Labour	Gerald Davies	279	11.3	−6.5
Labour	Dennis Wardleworth	259	10.5	−2.1
Green	Lisa Willis	123	5.0	New
Green	Pete West	113	4.6	New
SDP	Daniel Paul Avery	50	2.0	New
SDP	Linda Isobel Stenner	31	1.3	New
Turnout		2,473	31.29	
Conservative hold		Swing		
Conservative hold		Swing		

=== 2019 Dorset Council election ===
2019 Dorset Council election: Blandford (2 seats)
Party	Candidate	Votes	%	±%
Conservative	Byron Robert Quayle	1,573	55.0	
Conservative	Noc Lacey-Clarke	1,495	52.2	
Liberal Democrats	Hugo Anthony Mieville	774	27.0	
Liberal Democrats	John Edward Thomas Tanner	761	26.6	
Labour	Pat Osborne	509	17.8	
Labour	Doro Russell	362	12.6	
Majority		721	25.2	
Turnout		2,862	35.80	
Conservative win (new seat)				
Conservative win (new seat)				

== See also ==
- List of electoral wards in Dorset
