= Three Legged Cross =

Coordinates: 50.851°N 1.888°W

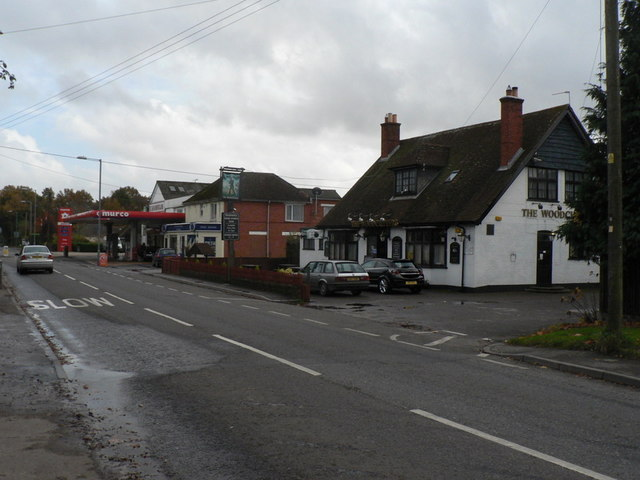
- Ringwood Road, Three Legged Cross (Showing the former Woodcutters pub, and Murco fuel garage)

- Location within Dorset
- Population: 2,740 (2014 est.)
- OS grid reference: SU079057
- Civil parish: Verwood
- Unitary authority: Dorset
- Ceremonial county: Dorset
- Region: South West
- Country: England
- Sovereign state: United Kingdom
- Post town: WIMBORNE
- Postcode district: BH21
- Dialling code: 01202
- Police: Dorset
- Fire: Dorset and Wiltshire
- Ambulance: South Western
- UK Parliament: Christchurch

Three Legged Cross is an extended village within Verwood civil parish in east Dorset, England. It lies to the south of the town of Verwood and to the north of West Moors. Its population in 2014 was estimated at 2,740.

== Origins ==
Various explanations have been put forward for the etymology of 'Three Legged Cross', which is recorded as a toponym from the sixteenth century onwards. One theory is that a type of gibbet known as a 'three-legged mare' once stood here; another theory is that there may once have been a boundary stone in the area marking the convergence of three great estates: Lord Shaftesbury's to the west, Lord Normanton's to the north and east, and the nineteenth-century banking family, the Rolles-Fryer's, to the south. The simpler explanation is that the name signifies the zigzagging configuration of the B3072 through this district, whereby the road is effectively divided into three separate stretches, or 'legs'.

== Politics ==
After 2019 structural changes to local government in England, Three Legged Cross is part of the West Moors and Three Legged Cross ward which elects two members to Dorset Council. Previously it was part of Vernwood and Three Legged Cross.
