= Littlemoor =

Village in Dorset, England

Coordinates: 50.6417°N 2.4463°W

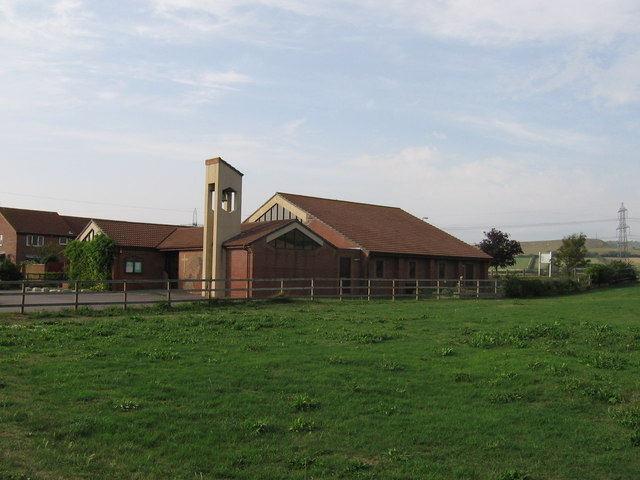
St. Francis church Littlemoor

Littlemoor is a suburb of Weymouth in Dorset, England. Littlemoor is about 2 miles (3 km) to the north of the town centre. The nearest railway station is Upwey 0.5 miles (0.8 km) to the west.

During World War I, the Littlemoor area was used as an Australian army camp. For this reason many of the roads in the area today are named after towns and cities in Australia.

Littlemoor has a skatepark, youth centre and a small shopping centre. Opposite the shopping centre there is a Library; next to which is a small green, and the local Church of England church - St. Francis of Assisi. There is also a community centre and a youth club.

Littlemoor is partially surrounded by fields. It has a woodland area (which has been named Teddy Bear woods, referencing to the famous nursery rhyme) managed by Dorset Wildlife Trust, part of their Lorton Meadows nature reserve.

Littlemoor has a high level of deprivation and poverty but this has decreased in recent years as the estate has expanded.

The estate is historically a labour stronghold and has been represented by labour councillors since it was created in 2004 with Cllr Mark Tewkesbury (Labour) serving since its creation. Since the move to a unitary council it has been represented by Cllr Tony Ferrari (Conservative) and Cllr Louie O'Leary as part of the Littlemoor and Preston ward. On 6 November 2023, councillor Tony Ferrari died after collapsing while running.

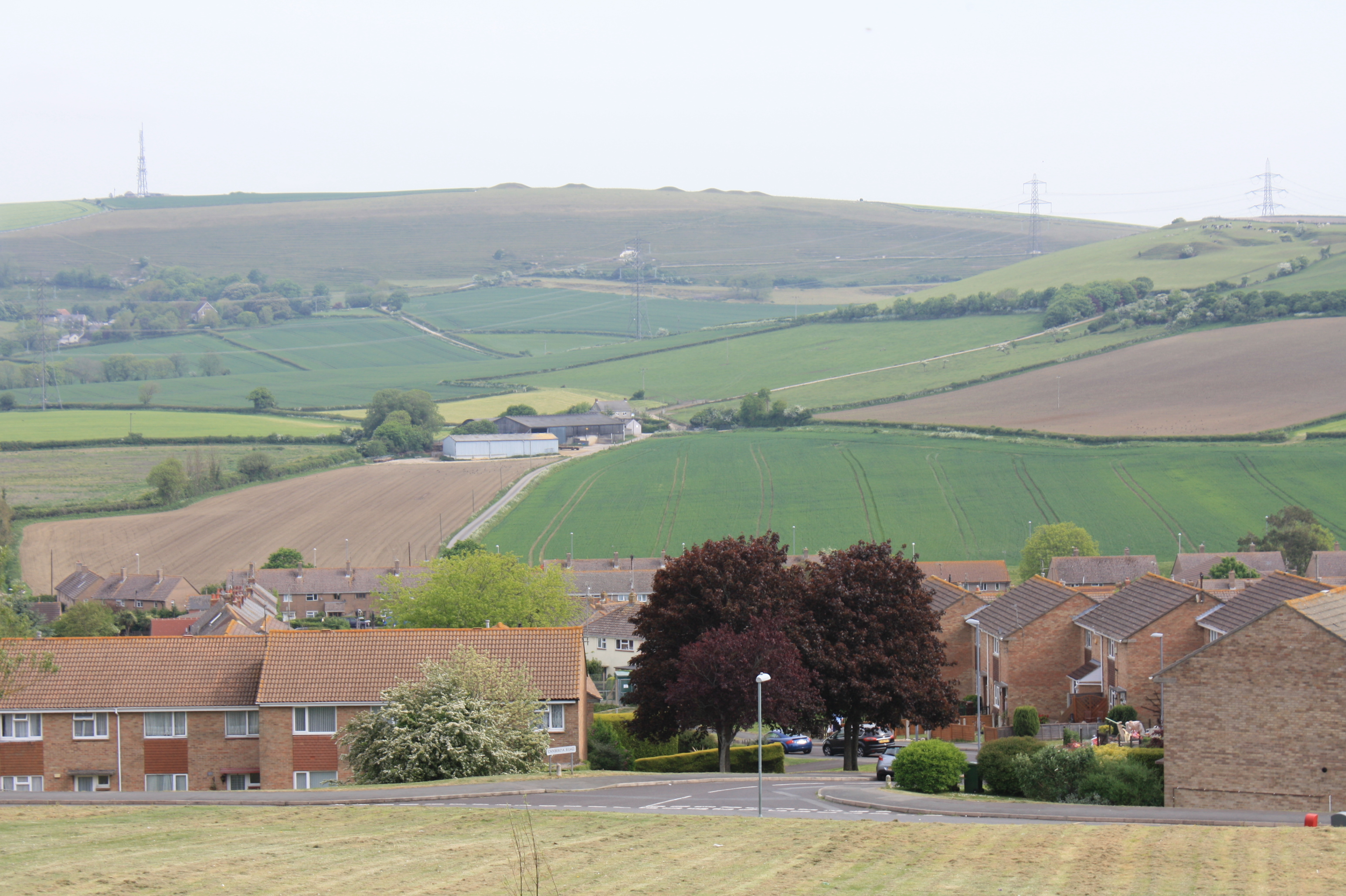
Littlemoor and Bincombe Bumps
