= Chesil Bank (ward) =

Electoral ward in Dorset, England

- ward Dorset Council
- Population: 3,964
- Major settlements: Abbotsbury, Burton Bradstock, Portesham

Current ward
- Created: 2019
- Councillor: Sally Anne Holland (Liberal Democrats)
- Number of councillors: 1

Chesil Bank is an electoral ward in Dorset. Since 2019, the ward has elected 1 councillor to Dorset Council.

== Geography ==
The Chesil Bank ward covers the villages along the Chesil Beach coast and Bride Valley in rural west Dorset. It is composed of the civil parishes of Abbotsbury, Burton Bradstock, Chilcombe, Fleet, Kingston Russell, Langton Herring, Littlebredy, Litton Cheney, Long Bredy, Portesham, Puncknowle, Shipton Gorge.

== Councillors ==
Election	Councillors
2019	Mark Brandon Roberts (Conservative)
2024	Sally Anne Holland (Liberal Democrats)

== Election ==
=== 2024 Dorset Council election ===
2024 Dorset Council election: Chesil Bank (1 seat)
Party	Candidate	Votes	%	±%
Liberal Democrats	Sally Anne Holland	704	43.5	+22.7
Conservative	Mark Roberts*	482	29.8	−9.4
Green	Peter Reid	373	23.0	−10.1
Labour	Richard Howard Nicholls	61	3.8	−3.1
Turnout		1,620	49.34	
Liberal Democrats gain from Conservative		Swing		

=== 2019 Dorset Council election ===
2019 Dorset Council election: Chesil Bank (1 seat)
Party	Candidate	Votes	%	±%
Conservative	Mark Brandon Roberts	595	39.2	
Green	Vaughan Jones	503	33.1	
Liberal Democrats	Sally Anne Holland	316	20.8	
Labour	Richard Howard Nicholls	105	6.9	
Majority				
Turnout			47.10	
Conservative win (new seat)				

== See also ==
- List of electoral wards in Dorset
