= Woolland =

Village and civil parish in Dorset, England

Coordinates: 50.8615°N 2.32°W

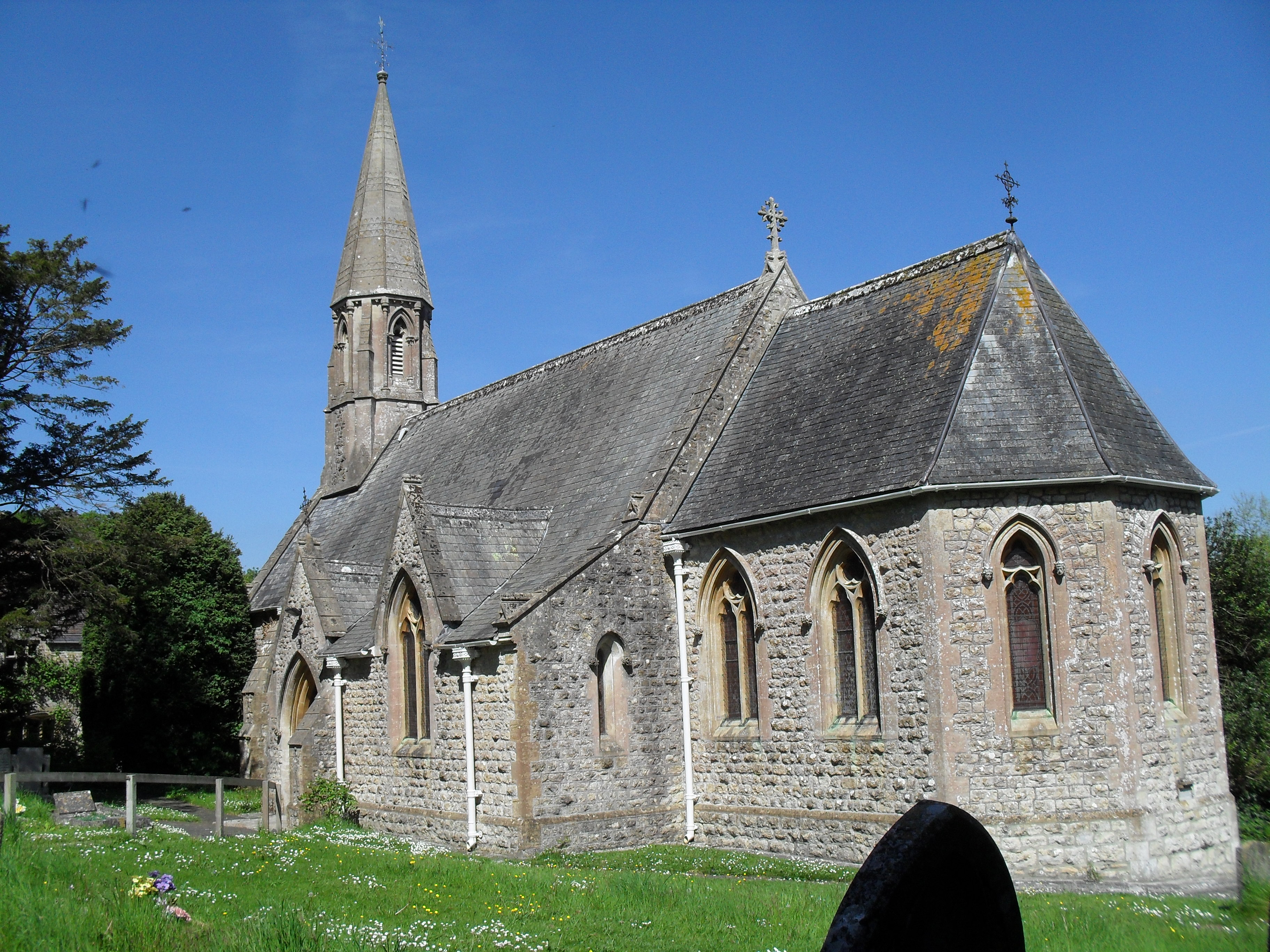
- Woolland Church

- Location within Dorset
- Interactive map showing the parish boundary
- Population: 75 (2021 census)
- OS grid reference: ST776069
- Unitary authority: Dorset
- Ceremonial county: Dorset
- Region: South West
- Country: England
- Sovereign state: United Kingdom
- Post town: Blandford Forum
- Postcode district: DT11
- Police: Dorset
- Fire: Dorset and Wiltshire
- Ambulance: South Western
- UK Parliament: North Dorset

Woolland is a village and civil parish in north Dorset, England, situated in the Blackmore Vale under Bulbarrow Hill 7 miles (11 km) west of Blandford Forum.

The village is first mentioned as Wonlond in Cartularium Saxonicum from the year 939; as Winlande in the Domesday Book from 1086; and as Wunlanda in the Pipe Rolls from 1170. The name is interpreted as Old English wynn-land meaning "meadow land" or "pasture land".

The sculptor Elisabeth Frink had a studio in the village during the 1970s.

The grade II listed parish church was designed by George Gilbert Scott and built in 1857.

== Governance ==
At the lower level of local government, Woolland is a civil parish. It does not have a parish council, instead holding parish meetings.

At the upper level of local government, Wooland is in Dorset unitary district. For elections to Dorset Council, it is part of Blackmore Vale electoral ward.

Historically, Woolland was in Sturminster Rural District from 1894 until 1974. It was then in North Dorset district until Dorset became unitary in 2019.

== Demographics ==
Census population of Woolland parish
Census	Population	Female	Male	Households	Source
1801	123	67	56		
1811	119	56	63		
1821	135	68	67		
1831	119	65	54		
1841	124	65	59		
1851	107	48	59		
1881	120	60	60		
1891	155	74	81		
1901	142	73	69	27	
1911	140	71	69	26	
1921	103	47	56	22	
1931	102	44	58	23	
1951	96	47	49	28	
1961	85	42	43	29	
1971	66	37	29		
1981	80				
1991	80				
2001 (Note: 2001 census data for Woolland is reported aggregated with data for Stoke Wake.)	123	66	57	45	
2011	130	69	61	54	
2021	75	35	40	36	
