= Yetminster (ward) =

Electoral ward in Dorset, England

- ward Dorset Council
- Population: 4,817
- Major settlements: Yetminster

Current ward
- Created: 2019
- Councillor: Chris Kippax (Liberal Democrat)
- Number of councillors: 1

Yetminster is an electoral ward in Dorset. Since 2019, the ward has elected 1 councillor to Dorset Council.

== Geography ==
The ward is a rural area located in North West Dorset and is composed of the civil parishes of Batcombe, Chetnole, Corscombe, East Chelborough, Evershot, Halstock, Hermitage, Hilfield, Holnest, Leigh, Leweston, Lillington, Longburton, Melbury Osmond, Melbury Sampford, Ryme Intrinseca, Stockwood, West Chelborough and Yetminster.

== Councillors ==
| Election | Councillors |
|---|---|
| 2019 | Mary Penfold (Conservative) |
| 2024 | Chris Kippax (Liberal Democrat) |

== Election ==
=== 2024 Dorset Council election ===
2024 Dorset Council election: Yetminster
| Party | Candidate | Votes | % | ±% |
|---|---|---|---|---|
| Liberal Democrats | Chris Kippax | 813 | 47.7 | +12.2 |
| Conservative | Diane Elizabeth Howell | 752 | 44.1 | −8.8 |
| Green | Stuart Martin | 139 | 8.2 | New |
| Rejected ballots | | 10 | 0.58 | |
| Turnout | | 1,704 | 42.08 | −1.38 |
| Registered electors | | 4,073 | | |
| Liberal Democrats gain from Conservative | | Swing | ▲10.5 | |

=== 2019 Dorset Council election ===
2019 Dorset Council election: Yetminster
| Party | Candidate | Votes | % | ±% |
|---|---|---|---|---|
| Conservative | Mary Penfold | 910 | 52.9 | |
| Liberal Democrats | Tim Fearon | 611 | 35.5 | |
| UKIP | Philip Lee Broomfield | 200 | 11.6 | |
| Majority | | | | |
| Turnout | | | 43.40 | |
| Conservative win (new seat) | | | | |

== See also ==
- List of electoral wards in Dorset
