= Charminster St Mary's (ward) =

Electoral ward in Dorset, England

- ward Dorset Council
- Population: 5,165
- Major settlements: Charminster

Current ward
- Created: 2019
- Councillor: David Taylor (Liberal Democrats)
- Number of councillors: 1

Charminster St Mary's is an electoral ward in Dorset. Since 2019, the ward has elected 1 councillor to Dorset Council.

== Geography ==
The Charminster St Mary's ward is rural and contains the villages of Charminster, Charlton Down and Stratton. The ward is named after the 11th century St Mary's Church.

== Councillors ==
| Election | Councillors |
|---|---|
| 2019 | David Taylor (Liberal Democrats) |
| 2024 | David Taylor (Liberal Democrats) |

== Election ==
=== 2024 Dorset Council election ===
2024 Dorset Council election: Charminster St Mary's (1 seat)
| Party | Candidate | Votes | % | ±% |
|---|---|---|---|---|
| Liberal Democrats | David Taylor* | 892 | 64.9 | +11.4 |
| Conservative | Nigel McCrea | 483 | 35.1 | +5.3 |
| Turnout | | 1,375 | 34.57 | |
| Liberal Democrats hold | | Swing | | |

=== 2019 Dorset Council election ===
2019 Dorset Council election: Charminster St Mary's (1 seat)
| Party | Candidate | Votes | % | ±% |
|---|---|---|---|---|
| Liberal Democrats | David Taylor | 846 | 53.5 | |
| Conservative | Tim Yarker | 472 | 29.8 | |
| Independent | Richard David Denton-White | 176 | 11.1 | |
| Labour | Michael John Maher | 88 | 5.6 | |
| Majority | | | | |
| Turnout | | | 42.20 | |
| Liberal Democrats win (new seat) | | | | |

== See also ==
- List of electoral wards in Dorset
