= Cranborne and Alderholt (ward) =

Electoral ward in Dorset, England

- ward Dorset Council
- Population: 5,150
- Major settlements: Alderholt, Cranborne

Current ward
- Created: 2019
- Councillor: David Lawrence Tooke (Liberal Democrat)
- Number of councillors: 1

Cranborne and Alderholt is an electoral ward in Dorset. Since 2019, the ward has elected 1 councillor to Dorset Council.

== Geography ==
The Cranborne and Alderholt ward is rural and is composed of the civil parishes of Alderholt, Cranborne, Edmondsham, Wimborne St Giles and Woodlands.

== Councillors ==
Election	Councillors
2019	David Lawrence Tooke (Liberal Democrats)
2024	David Lawrence Tooke (Liberal Democrats)

== Election ==
=== 2019 Dorset Council election ===
2019 Dorset Council election: Cranborne and Alderholt (1 seat)
Party	Candidate	Votes	%	±%
Liberal Democrats	David Lawrence Tooke	689	46.7	
Conservative	Steve Butler	671	45.5	
Labour	Peter Thomas Parsons	116	7.9	
Majority				
Turnout			37.90	
Liberal Democrats win (new seat)				

=== 2024 Dorset Council election ===
2024 Dorset Council election: Cranborne and Alderholt (1 seat)
Party	Candidate	Votes	%	±%
Liberal Democrats	Dave Tooke*	678	53.7	+7.0
Conservative	Adrian Hibberd	508	40.2	−5.3
Labour	Peter Parsons	77	6.1	−1.8
Turnout		1,263	32.33	
Liberal Democrats hold		Swing		

== See also ==
- List of electoral wards in Dorset
