= Littlemoor and Preston (ward) =

Electoral ward in Dorset, England

- ward Dorset Council
- Population: 9,528
- Major settlements: Littlemoor, Preston

Current ward
- Created: 2019
- Councillor: Louie O'Leary (Conservative)
- Councillor: Peter Dickenson (Conservative)
- Number of councillors: 2

Littlemoor and Preston is an electoral ward in Dorset. Since 2019, the ward has elected 2 councillors to Dorset Council.

== History ==
On 6 November 2023, councillor Tony Ferrari died after collapsing while running.

== Geography ==
The Littlemoor and Preston ward covers the Weymouth suburbs of Littlemoor and Preston.

== Councillors ==
Election	Councillors	
2019	Louie O'Leary (Conservative)	Tony Ferrari (Conservative)
2024 by-election	Louie O'Leary (Conservative)	Peter Dickenson (Conservative)
2024	Louie O'Leary (Conservative)	Peter Dickenson (Conservative)

== Election ==
=== 2024 Dorset Council election ===
2024 Dorset Council election: Littlemoor and Preston (2 seats)
Party	Candidate	Votes	%	±%
Conservative	Louie James O'Leary*	1,599	56.3	+23.9
Conservative	Peter Dickenson*	1,379	48.6	+13.3
Liberal Democrats	Howard Richard Legg	688	24.2	+3.6
Liberal Democrats	Ann Weaving	664	23.4	+6.1
Independent	Alex Bailey	439	15.5	New
Labour	Steve Brown	408	14.4	−9.2
Turnout		2,838	37.42	
Conservative hold		Swing		
Conservative hold		Swing		

=== 2024 by-election ===
A by-election was held on 11 January 2024 to replace Tony Ferrari who died. It was held by Conservative Peter Dickenson.

Littlemoor and Preston by-election 11 January 2024
Party	Candidate	Votes	%	±%
Conservative	Peter Dickenson	1,237	53.7	+24.3
Liberal Democrats	Simon Clifford	833	36.2	+19.1
Labour	Stephen Brown	232	10.1	−9.5
Majority		404	17.5	
Turnout		2,302		
Conservative hold		Swing		

=== 2019 Dorset Council election ===
2019 Dorset Council election: Littlemoor and Preston (2 seats)
Party	Candidate	Votes	%	±%
Conservative	Tony Ferrari	1,078	35.3	
Conservative	Louie James O`Leary	988	32.4	
Independent	Michael McCallister Wilkinson	741	24.3	
Labour	Mark Richard Tewkesbury	719	23.6	
Liberal Democrats	Gillian Pearson	629	20.6	
Labour	Ann Weaving	527	17.3	
Green	John Victor Tomblin	505	16.6	
Independent	David Skinner	347	11.4	
Majority				
Turnout		3,050	40.15	
Conservative win (new seat)				
Conservative win (new seat)				

== See also ==
- List of electoral wards in Dorset
