= Swanage (ward) =

Electoral ward in Dorset, England

- ward Dorset Council
- Population: 9,702
- Major settlements: Swanage

Current ward
- Created: 2019
- Councillor: Gary Suttle (Conservative)
- Councillor: Chris Tomes (Conservative)
- Number of councillors: 2

Swanage is an electoral ward in Dorset. Since 2019, the ward has elected 2 councillors to Dorset Council.

== Geography ==
The Swanage ward contains the town of Swanage.

== Councillors ==
Election	Councillors	
2019	Gary Suttle (Conservative)	Bill Trite (Conservative)
2024	Gary Suttle (Conservative)	Bill Trite (Conservative)
2025	Gary Suttle (Conservative)	Chris Tomes (Conservative)

== Elections ==
=== 2019 Dorset Council election ===
2019 Dorset Council election: Swanage (2 seats)
Party	Candidate	Votes	%	±%
Conservative	Gary Maurice Suttle	1,546	45.9	
Conservative	William Stanley Trite	1,457	43.3	
Labour	Debby Monkhouse	780	23.2	
Independent	Philip Michael Eades	677	20.1	
Labour	Chris Bradey	614	18.2	
Liberal Democrats	Gill Calvin Thomas	592	17.6	
Liberal Democrats	Cliff Sutton	469	13.9	
Independent	Jason Paul Haiselden	351	10.4	
Majority				
Turnout		3,368	42.38	
Conservative win (new seat)				
Conservative win (new seat)				

=== 2024 Dorset Council election ===
Swanage (2 seats)
Party	Candidate	Votes	%	±%
Conservative	Gary Maurice Suttle*	1,262	39.7	−6.2
Conservative	William Stanley Trite*	1,148	36.2	−7.1
Labour	Debby Monkhouse	1,084	34.1	+10.9
Labour	Chris Bradey	789	24.9	+6.7
Independent	Philip Michael Eades	686	21.6	+1.5
Independent	Helen Mary McDavid	460	14.5	New
Liberal Democrats	Matt Piper	283	8.9	−5.0
Green	Kia Pope	215	6.8	New
Liberal Democrats	Gill Calvin Thomas	192	6.0	−11.6
Turnout		3,175	40.92	
Conservative hold		Swing		
Conservative hold		Swing		

=== 2025 Swanage by-election ===
Following the death of Conservative councillor Bill Trite, a by-election was held on Thursday the 24th of July 2025 to select his successor.

Swanage (1 seat contested)
Party	Candidate	Votes	%	±%
Conservative	Chris Tomes	1,254	35.3	−2.7
Reform UK	John Lejeune	748	21.0	New
Liberal Democrats	Poppy Maltby	737	20.7	+13.3
IfD	Philip Michael Eades	415	11.7	New
Labour	Gemma Simmons	400	11.2	−18.3
Majority		506	14.2	+5.8
Turnout		3558	45.37	+4.45
Conservative hold		Swing	-2.7	

== See also ==
- List of electoral wards in Dorset
