= Shaftesbury Town (ward) =

Electoral ward in Dorset, England

- ward Dorset Council
- Population: 8,985
- Major settlements: Shaftesbury

Current ward
- Created: 2019
- Councillor: Derek Beer (Liberal Democrats)
- Councillor: Jack Jeanes (Liberal Democrats)
- Number of councillors: 2

Shaftesbury Town is an electoral ward in Dorset. Since 2019, the ward has elected 2 councillors to Dorset Council.

== Geography ==
The Shaftesbury Town ward covers the town of the same name.

== Councillors ==
Election	Councillors	
2019	Derek Beer (Liberal Democrats)	Tim Cook (Liberal Democrats)
2024	Derek Beer (Liberal Democrats)	Jack Jeanes (Liberal Democrats)

== Election ==
=== 2019 Dorset Council election ===
2019 Dorset Council election: Shaftesbury Town (2 seats)
Party	Candidate	Votes	%	±%
Liberal Democrats	Derek Leslie Beer	1,177	50.6	
Liberal Democrats	Tim Cook	682	29.3	
Conservative	Julian Pritchard	480	20.6	
Conservative	Alexander Edward Chase	381	16.4	
Independent	Andrew Reginald Hollingshead	360	15.5	
Independent	Peter David Yeo	273	11.7	
UKIP	Lester Geoffrey Taylor	250	10.7	
UKIP	Steve Unwin	233	10.0	
Labour	Melanie Costas	213	9.2	
Independent	Lester Mark Dibben	147	6.3	
Labour	William Kenealy	145	6.2	
Majority				
Turnout		2,326	35.21	
Liberal Democrats win (new seat)				
Liberal Democrats win (new seat)				

=== 2024 Dorset Council election ===
Shaftesbury Town
Party	Candidate	Votes	%	±%
Liberal Democrats	Derek Leslie Beer*	1,403	60.1	+9.5
Liberal Democrats	Jack David John Jeanes	1,008	43.2	+13.9
Conservative	Virginia Edwyn-Jones	558	23.9	+3.3
Independent	Andrew Reginald Hollingshead	529	22.7	+7.2
Conservative	Barry von Clemens	269	11.5	−4.9
Labour	Dan Bavister	233	10.0	+0.8
No Description	Lester Mark Dibben	187	8.0	+1.7
Patriots Alliance (English Democrats and UKIP)	Steve Unwin	118	5.1	−4.9
Patriots Alliance (English Democrats and UKIP)	Lester Taylor	86	3.7	−7.0
Turnout		2,335	34.40	
Liberal Democrats hold		Swing		
Liberal Democrats hold		Swing		

== See also ==
- List of electoral wards in Dorset
