= Gillingham (ward) =

Electoral ward in Dorset, England

- ward Dorset Council
- Population: 15,944
- Major settlements: Gillingham

Current ward
- Created: 2019
- Councillor: Val Pothecary (Conservative)
- Councillor: Belinda Ridout (Conservative)
- Councillor: Carl Woode (Liberal Democrats)
- Number of councillors: 3

Gillingham is an electoral ward in Dorset. Since 2019, the ward has elected 3 councillors to Dorset Council.

== History ==
In the 2019 Dorset Council election, the ward elected three Conservatives.

== Geography ==
The Gillingham ward is named for the town of Gillingham and also contains the civil parishes of Bourton, Buckhorn Weston, East Stour, Kington Magna, Motcombe and West Stour

== Councillors ==
Election	Councillors		
2019	Val Pothecary (Conservative)	Belinda Ridout (Conservative)	David Walsh (Conservative)
2024	Val Pothecary (Conservative)	Belinda Ridout (Conservative)	Carl Woode (Liberal Democrats)

== Election ==
=== 2019 Dorset Council election ===
2019 Dorset Council election: Gillingham (3 seats)
Party	Candidate	Votes	%	±%
Conservative	Belinda Ridout	1,799	43.4	
Conservative	Valerie Rose Pothecary	1,682	40.6	
Conservative	David Walsh	1,626	39.2	
Liberal Democrats	Barry Von Clemens	1,245	30.0	
Liberal Democrats	Mike Gould	958	23.1	
Independent	Mark Jonathan White	853	20.6	
Liberal Democrats	John William Butcher	765	18.5	
UKIP	Nick Edmunds	582	14.0	
UKIP	Peter Caulfield	533	12.9	
UKIP	Jane Unwin	497	12.0	
Labour	Fiona Jane Cullen	433	10.4	
Labour	Philip Peter Wilson	415	10.0	
Labour	Paul Taylor	322	7.8	
Majority				
Turnout		4,145	34.19	
Conservative win (new seat)				
Conservative win (new seat)				
Conservative win (new seat)				

=== 2024 Dorset Council election ===
2024 Dorset Council election: Gillingham (3 seats)
Party	Candidate	Votes	%	±%
Conservative	Val Pothecary*	1,549	42.5	+1.9
Conservative	Belinda Brenda Louise Ridout*	1,528	41.9	−1.5
Liberal Democrats	Carl Anthony Woode	1,490	40.9	+10.9
Liberal Democrats	David Charles Thomas Fox	1,444	39.6	+16.5
Conservative	David Walsh*	1,408	38.6	−0.6
Liberal Democrats	Alex Percy	1,402	38.4	+19.9
Green	Angela Henshall	554	15.2	New
Labour	Anna Marsh	532	14.6	+4.2
Turnout		3,647	30.19	
Conservative hold		Swing		
Conservative hold		Swing		
Liberal Democrats gain from Conservative		Swing		

== See also ==
- List of electoral wards in Dorset
