= Stalbridge and Marnhull =

Electoral ward in Dorset, England

- ward Dorset Council
- Population: 4,917
- Major settlements: Stalbridge and Marnhull

Current ward
- Created: 2019
- Councillor: James Charles Vitali (Conservative)
- Number of councillors: 1

Stalbridge and Marnhull is an electoral ward in Dorset. Since 2019, the ward has elected 1 councillor to Dorset Council.

== Geography ==
The Stalbridge and Marnhull ward is rural and contains the villages of Stalbridge and Marnhull.

== Councillors ==
Election	Councillors
2019	Graham Carr-Jones (Conservative)
2024	James Charles Vitali (Conservative)

== Election ==
=== 2019 Dorset Council election ===
2019 Dorset Council election: Stalbridge and Marnhull (1 seat)
Party	Candidate	Votes	%	±%
Conservative	Graham Carr-Jones	837	47.6	
Liberal Democrats	Ros Eveleigh	541	30.8	
UKIP	Rory Herbert	246	14.0	
Labour	Pippa Shillington	135	7.7	
Majority				
Turnout			42.30	
Conservative win (new seat)				

=== 2024 Dorset Council election ===
Stalbridge and Marnhull
Party	Candidate	Votes	%	±%
Conservative	James Charles Vitali	767	51.0	+3.4
Liberal Democrats	Rosalind Sheila Eveleigh	603	40.1	+9.3
Green	Richard Harvey	133	8.8	New
Turnout		1,503	34.46	
Conservative hold		Swing		

== See also ==
- List of electoral wards in Dorset
