= 2024 Dorset Council election =

2024 English local election

- 2 May 2024

All 82 seats to Dorset Council 42 seats needed for a majority

	First party	Second party	Third party
Leader	Nick Ireland	Spencer Flower	Clare Sutton
Party	Liberal Democrats	Conservative	Green
Last election	29	43	4
Seats before	27	43	5
Seats after	42	30	4
Seat change	▲13	▼13	Steady
Popular vote	38,669	36,411	8,989
Percentage	36.7%	34.6%	8.5%
Swing	▲7.7 pp	▼1.7 pp	▼0.6 pp
	Fourth party	Fifth party	Sixth party
Leader	Les Fry	Paul Kimber	N/A
Party	Independents for Dorset	Labour	Independent
Last election	Did not exist	2	4
Seats before	4	2	1
Seats after	3	2	1
Seat change	▲3	Steady	▼3
Popular vote	3,077	12,282	4,797
Percentage	2.9%	11.7%	4.6%
Swing	New	▲0.8 pp	▼4.1 pp
- Map showing the results of the 2024 Dorset Council elections.
Leader before election
Spencer Flower
Conservative
Leader after election
Nick Ireland
Liberal Democrats

The 2024 Dorset Council election took place on Thursday 2 May 2024 to elect all 82 councillors to Dorset Council in England, the same day as other local elections in the United Kingdom.

Dorset Council was previously controlled by the Conservatives, who won the first election to the Council in 2019. The 2024 election was the last for a five-year term of office; after 2029, elections will take place every four years.

The Liberal Democrats were aiming to gain control of the council from the Conservatives, which they achieved. The Liberal Democrat group leader, Nick Ireland, was subsequently appointed leader of the council at the annual council meeting on 16 May 2024.

== Wards ==
Ward	Councillors
Beacon	1
Beaminster	1
Blackmore Vale	1
Blandford	2
Bridport	3
Chalk Valleys	1
Charminster St Mary's	1
Chesil Bank	1
Chickerell	2
Colehill and Wimborne Minster East	2
Corfe Mullen	2
Cranborne and Alderholt	1
Cranborne Chase	1
Crossways	1
Dorchester East	2
Dorchester Poundbury	1
Dorchester West	2
Eggardon	1
Ferndown North	2
Ferndown South	2
Gillingham	3
Hill Forts and Upper Tarrants	1
Littlemoor and Preston	2
Lyme and Charmouth	1
Lytchett Matravers and Upton	3
Marshwood Vale	1
Melcombe Regis	1
Portland	3
Puddletown and Lower Winterborne	1
Radipole	2
Rodwell and Wyke	3
Shaftesbury Town	2
Sherborne East	1
Sherborne Rural	1
Sherborne West	1
South East Purbeck	1
St Leonards and St Ives	2
Stalbridge and Marnhull	1
Stour and Allen Vale	1
Sturminster Newton	1
Swanage	2
Upwey and Broadwey	1
Verwood	3
Wareham	2
West Moors and Three Legged Cross	2
West Parley	1
West Purbeck	2
Westham	2
Wimborne Minster	2
Winterborne and Broadmayne	1
Winterborne North	1
Yetminster	1

== Overall results ==
Results
Party	Seats	Change
Liberal Democrats	42	▲13
Conservative Party	30	▼13
Green	4	Steady
Independents for Dorset	4	Steady
Labour	2	Steady

== Seats changing hands ==
Ward	Party before	Party after
Bridport	Green	Liberal Democrats
Chesil Bank	Conservative	Liberal Democrats
Chickerell	Conservative	Liberal Democrats
Chickerell	Independent	Liberal Democrats
Corfe Mullen	Conservative	Liberal Democrats
Eggardon	Conservative	Liberal Democrats
Gillingham	Conservative	Liberal Democrats
Lyme and Charmouth	Conservative	Green
Lytchett Matravers and Upton	Conservative	Liberal Democrats
South East Purbeck	Conservative	Liberal Democrats
Stour and Allen Vale	Conservative	Liberal Democrats
West Purbeck	Conservative	Liberal Democrats
Winterborne North	Conservative	Liberal Democrats
Yetminster	Conservative	Liberal Democrats

== Ward results ==
=== Beacon ===
Beacon
Party	Candidate	Votes	%	±%
Conservative	Jane Somper*	898	61.3	−3.1
Liberal Democrats	Claire Elizabeth Reed	307	20.9	−5.8
Labour	Gillian Clare Cross	133	9.1	+0.1
Green	Sheila Healy	125	8.5	New
Rejected ballots		5	0.34	
Turnout		1,466	38.32	
Registered electors		3,826		
Conservative hold		Swing		

=== Beaminster ===
Beaminster
Party	Candidate	Votes	%	±%
Conservative	Craig Monks	601	42.9	−4.8
Liberal Democrats	Paul David Fitzpatrick	579	41.3	+3.7
Labour	Julie Cooke	70	5.0	+0.5
Reform	Yvonne Harris	69	4.9	New
Green	Andy McEwen	65	4.6	−5.4
Independent	Richard Thomas Gunning	17	1.2	New
Rejected ballots		0	0.0	
Turnout		1,401	40.33	
Registered electors		3,474		
Conservative hold		Swing		

=== Blackmore Vale ===
Blackmore Vale
Party	Candidate	Votes	%	±%
Conservative	Stephen Murcer	637	50.3	−11.5
Liberal Democrats	Ian Philip Suter	468	37.0	+22.4
Green	Vicki Elcoate	161	12.7	New
Rejected ballots		13	1.02	
Turnout		1,279	35.09	
Registered electors		3,645		
Conservative hold		Swing		

=== Blandford ===
Blandford
Party	Candidate	Votes	%	±%
Conservative	Byron Robert Quayle*	1,334	53.9	−1.1
Conservative	Noc Lacey-Clarke*	1,307	52.9	+0.7
Liberal Democrats	Hugo Anthony Mieville	756	30.6	+3.6
Liberal Democrats	David Edwin Orton	556	22.5	−4.1
Labour	Gerald Davies	279	11.3	−6.5
Labour	Dennis Wardleworth	259	10.5	−2.1
Green	Lisa Willis	123	5.0	New
Green	Pete West	113	4.6	New
SDP	Daniel Paul Avery	50	2.0	New
SDP	Linda Isobel Stenner	31	1.3	New
Rejected ballots		10	0.4	
Turnout		2,483	31.29	
Registered electors		7,935		
Conservative hold		Swing		
Conservative hold		Swing		

=== Bridport ===
Bridport
Party	Candidate	Votes	%	±%
Liberal Democrats	Sarah Williams*	1,726	41.5	−0.8
Liberal Democrats	Dave Bolwell*	1,646	39.6	+6.3
Liberal Democrats	Bridget Bolwell	1,587	38.2	+18.2
Green	Kelvin Charles Clayton*	1,562	37.6	+1.7
Green	Julian Stephen Langton Jones	1,166	28.0	New
Green	Bob Hamblett	880	21.2	New
Conservative	Una Christopher	832	20.0	−6.2
Labour	Steven Rose	760	18.3	+1.0
Conservative	Anna Louise Cox	754	18.1	−7.3
Conservative	Frances Kathleen McKenzie	747	18.0	−5.3
Rejected ballots		46	1.09	
Turnout		4,204	35.07	
Registered electors		11,986		
Liberal Democrats hold		Swing		
Liberal Democrats gain from Green		Swing		
Liberal Democrats hold		Swing		

=== Chalk Valleys ===
Chalk Valleys
Party	Candidate	Votes	%	±%
Conservative	Jill Haynes	683	48.0	−2.4
Liberal Democrats	Iain Douglas Young	554	38.9	+17.1
Labour	John Bennett	186	13.1	New
Rejected ballots		19	1.32	
Turnout		1,443	36.99	
Registered electors		3,901		
Conservative hold		Swing		

=== Charminster St Mary's ===
Charminster St Mary's
Party	Candidate	Votes	%	±%
Liberal Democrats	David Taylor*	892	64.9	+11.4
Conservative	Nigel McCrea	483	35.1	+5.3
Rejected ballots		7	0.51	
Turnout		1,382	34.57	
Registered electors		3,998		
Liberal Democrats hold		Swing		

=== Chesil Bank ===
Chesil Bank
Party	Candidate	Votes	%	±%
Liberal Democrats	Sally Anne Holland	704	43.5	+22.7
Conservative	Mark Roberts*	482	29.8	−9.4
Green	Peter Reid	373	23.0	−10.1
Labour	Richard Howard Nicholls	61	3.8	−3.1
Rejected ballots		16	0.98	
Turnout		1,637	49.34	
Registered electors		3,318		
Liberal Democrats gain from Conservative		Swing		

=== Chickerell ===
Chickerell
Party	Candidate	Votes	%	±%
Liberal Democrats	Gill Taylor	891	49.2	+29.5
Liberal Democrats	Simon Arthur Dewi Clifford	729	40.3	+24.7
Conservative	Jean Dunseith*	690	38.1	−4.2
Conservative	Andrew William MacLeod Reid	570	31.5	+1.6
Labour	Grafton Alphonso Straker	329	18.2	+3.0
Rejected ballots		23	1.25	
Turnout		1,834	28.58	
Registered electors		6,416		
Liberal Democrats gain from Conservative		Swing		
Liberal Democrats gain from Independent		Swing		

=== Colehill & Wimborne Minster East ===
Colehill & Wimborne Minster East
Party	Candidate	Votes	%	±%
Liberal Democrats	Andrew Thomas Todd	1,275	48.0	−9.4
Liberal Democrats	Jindy Atwal	1,168	44.0	+5.9
Conservative	KD Johnson	940	35.4	+1.0
Conservative	Carol Lynda Butter	764	28.8	+1.4
Independent	Emma Urquhart	578	21.8	New
Labour	David Moore	215	8.1	+2.9
Rejected ballots		5	0.19	
Turnout		2,661	36.72	
Registered electors		7,247		
Liberal Democrats hold		Swing		
Liberal Democrats hold		Swing		

=== Corfe Mullen ===
Corfe Mullen
Party	Candidate	Votes	%	±%
Liberal Democrats	Duncan Sowry-House	1,249	53.7	+14.6
Liberal Democrats	Scott Florek	1,145	49.3	+1.6
Conservative	Mike Barron*	641	27.6	−20.1
Conservative	Penny Barron	597	25.7	−18.7
Independent	Lee Charles Hardy	457	19.7	New
Labour	Graham Paul Hillman	197	8.5	+0.9
Rejected ballots		4	0.17	
Turnout		2,328	29.03	
Registered electors		8,020		
Liberal Democrats hold		Swing		
Liberal Democrats gain from Conservative		Swing		

=== Cranborne & Alderholt ===
Cranborne and Alderholt
Party	Candidate	Votes	%	±%
Liberal Democrats	Dave Tooke*	678	53.7	+7.0
Conservative	Adrian Hibberd	508	40.2	−5.3
Labour	Peter Parsons	77	6.1	−1.8
Rejected ballots		10	0.78	
Turnout		1,278	32.33	
Registered electors		3,953		
Liberal Democrats hold		Swing		

=== Cranborne Chase ===
Cranborne Chase
Party	Candidate	Votes	%	±%
Conservative	Piers Brown*	634	65.4	−0.2
Liberal Democrats	Tom Harding	194	20.0	New
Labour	Louise Claire Cooper	142	14.6	−2.9
Rejected ballots		18	1.82	
Turnout		991	30.24	
Registered electors		3,277		
Conservative hold		Swing		

=== Crossways ===
Crossways
Party	Candidate	Votes	%	±%
Liberal Democrats	Nick Ireland*	636	57.3	−5.0
Conservative	Andrew Ross-Skinner	361	32.5	+2.4
Labour	Jim Draper	113	10.2	+2.6
Rejected ballots		16	1.42	
Turnout		1,126	37.4	
Registered electors		3,010		
Liberal Democrats hold		Swing		

=== Dorchester East ===
Dorchester East
Party	Candidate	Votes	%	±%
Liberal Democrats	Stella Jones*	1,337	52.4	−11.2
Liberal Democrats	Rory Major	979	38.3	−25.9
Green	Kate Hebditch	825	32.3	New
IfD	Katy Jones	571	22.4	New
Conservative	Angus Christopher	329	12.9	−4.9
Conservative	Mina Bowater	322	12.6	−7.9
Labour	Barry Thompson	304	11.9	−1.6
Labour	Ash Mottaghi	208	8.1	−8.3
Rejected ballots		13	0.51	
Turnout		2,566	38.54	
Registered electors		6,658		
Liberal Democrats hold		Swing		
Liberal Democrats hold		Swing		

=== Dorchester Poundbury ===
Dorchester Poundbury
Party	Candidate	Votes	%	±%
Liberal Democrats	Richard Martin Biggs*	780	54.0	+18.1
Conservative	Peter Jonathon Stein	449	31.1	−1.5
Labour	Nick Boothroyd	122	8.4	+4.1
Green	Len Herbert	93	6.4	+0.7
Rejected ballots		16	1.1	
Turnout		1,461	41.38	
Registered electors		3,531		
Liberal Democrats hold		Swing		

=== Dorchester West ===
Dorchester West
Party	Candidate	Votes	%	±%
IfD	Les Fry*	1,335	58.5	+19.6
Liberal Democrats	Andy Canning*	1,322	57.9	+13.2
Labour	Claudia Sorin	580	25.4	+14.8
Conservative	Jeremy Peel-Yates	261	11.4	−7.3
Labour	Andrew Charles Wyatt	259	11.3	+1.6
Conservative	Kevin Selby	254	11.1	−1.2
Rejected ballots		8	0.35	
Turnout		2,290	34.06	
Registered electors		6,724		
IfD hold		Swing		
Liberal Democrats hold		Swing		

=== Eggardon ===
Eggardon
Party	Candidate	Votes	%	±%
Liberal Democrats	Neil Jeffrey Eysenck	724	43.7	+26.0
Conservative	Harry Coutts	637	38.5	−9.6
Green	Richard Edwards	238	14.4	−9.3
Labour	David Machin	57	3.4	−7.1
Rejected ballots		14	0.84	
Turnout		1,670	41.08	
Registered electors		4,065		
Liberal Democrats gain from Conservative		Swing		

=== Ferndown North ===
Ferndown North
Party	Candidate	Votes	%	±%
Conservative	Cathy Lugg*	955	44.3	−9.8
Conservative	Mike Parkes*	794	36.8	−13.3
Independent	Simon Lee Cable	781	36.2	New
Independent	Philip Leach	753	34.9	New
Liberal Democrats	Michael Adrian Clements	304	14.1	−9.7
Reform	Andrei Silviu Dragotoniu	232	10.8	New
Liberal Democrats	Esbjörn Roderick Wilmar	228	10.6	−11.9
Rejected ballots		15	0.69	
Turnout		2,171	29.62	
Registered electors		7,330		
Conservative hold		Swing		
Conservative hold		Swing		

=== Ferndown South ===
Ferndown South
Party	Candidate	Votes	%	±%
Conservative	Julie Lorraine Robinson*	684	38.6	−0.3
Independent	Hannah Hobbs-Chell	621	35.0	New
Conservative	George Phillips	602	34.0	−1.0
Independent	Lawrence Leslie Ralph Wilson	556	31.4	+6.6
Independent	Paul Hanson Graham	367	20.7	+1.8
Liberal Democrats	Susan Jefferies	276	15.6	−8.5
Liberal Democrats	Ross Alexander Bowell	270	15.2	New
Rejected ballots		26	1.45	
Turnout		1,799	26.45	
Registered electors		6,802		
Conservative hold		Swing		
Independent gain from Conservative		Swing		

=== Gillingham ===
Gillingham
Party	Candidate	Votes	%	±%
Conservative	Val Pothecary*	1,549	42.5	+1.9
Conservative	Belinda Brenda Louise Ridout*	1,528	41.9	−1.5
Liberal Democrats	Carl Anthony Woode	1,490	40.9	+10.9
Liberal Democrats	David Charles Thomas Fox	1,444	39.6	+16.5
Conservative	David Walsh*	1,408	38.6	−0.6
Liberal Democrats	Alex Percy	1,402	38.4	+19.9
Green	Angela Henshall	554	15.2	New
Labour	Anna Marsh	532	14.6	+4.2
Rejected ballots		35	0.95	
Turnout		3,682	30.19	
Registered electors		12,196		
Conservative hold		Swing		
Conservative hold		Swing		
Liberal Democrats gain from Conservative		Swing		

=== Hill Forts & Upper Tarrants ===
Hill Forts and Upper Tarrants
Party	Candidate	Votes	%	±%
Conservative	Sherry Jespersen*	709	55.4	−5.1
Liberal Democrats	Joseph Roger Hickish	251	19.6	−4.2
Labour	Alan Cross	168	13.1	−2.6
Green	Keith Yarwood	151	11.8	New
Rejected ballots		17	1.31	
Turnout		1,296	36.47	
Registered electors		3,554		
Conservative hold		Swing		

=== Littlemoor & Preston ===
Littlemoor and Preston
Party	Candidate	Votes	%	±%
Conservative	Louie James O'Leary*	1,599	56.3	+23.9
Conservative	Peter Dickenson*	1,379	48.6	+13.3
Liberal Democrats	Howard Richard Legg	688	24.2	+3.6
Liberal Democrats	Ann Weaving	664	23.4	+6.1
Independent	Alex Bailey	439	15.5	New
Labour	Steve Brown	408	14.4	−9.2
Rejected ballots		14	0.49	
Turnout		2,852	37.42	
Registered electors		7,622		
Conservative hold		Swing		
Conservative hold		Swing		

=== Lyme & Charmouth ===
Lyme and Charmouth
Party	Candidate	Votes	%	±%
Green	Belinda Bawden*	884	61.0	+46.2
Conservative	Michaela Louise Ellis	380	26.2	−13.9
Liberal Democrats	Paddy Mooney	103	7.1	New
Labour	David Hart	83	5.7	−7.0
Rejected ballots		7	0.48	
Turnout		1,460	35.92	
Registered electors		4,065		
Green gain from Conservative		Swing		

=== Lytchett Matravers & Upton ===
Lytchett Matravers and Upton
Party	Candidate	Votes	%	±%
Liberal Democrats	Steve Robinson	1,356	50.7	+17.0
Liberal Democrats	Alex Brenton*	1,354	50.7	+9.4
Liberal Democrats	Andrew James Starr*	1,155	43.2	−1.2
Conservative	Bill Pipe*	1,073	40.2	−5.2
Conservative	Sean Gabriel	965	36.1	−4.3
Conservative	Stew McKell	928	34.7	−3.4
Labour	John Patrick Billington	363	13.6	+3.9
Rejected ballots		24	0.89	
Turnout		2,696	27.72	
Registered electors		9,726		
Liberal Democrats gain from Conservative		Swing		
Liberal Democrats hold		Swing		
Liberal Democrats hold		Swing		

=== Marshwood Vale ===
Marshwood Vale
Party	Candidate	Votes	%	±%
Conservative	Simon John Christopher	645	39.8	+0.8
Green	Jacqui Sewell	525	32.4	+1.5
Liberal Democrats	Jane Gregory	340	21.0	+11.3
Labour	Steve Chapman	109	6.7	+2.3
Rejected ballots		8	0.49	
Turnout		1,627	41.37	
Registered electors		3,933		
Conservative hold		Swing		

=== Melcombe Regis ===
Melcombe Regis
Party	Candidate	Votes	%	±%
Green	Jon Orrell*	419	49.2	−13.6
Conservative	Claire Wall	256	30.1	+10.1
Labour	Howard John Atkinson	176	20.7	+3.4
Rejected ballots		16	1.85	
Turnout		866	26.01	
Registered electors		3,330		
Green hold		Swing		

=== Portland ===
Portland
Party	Candidate	Votes	%	±%
IfD	Pete Roper	899	35.6	New
IfD	Rob Hughes*	895	35.5	−1.8
Labour	Paul Ralph Kimber*	875	34.7	+2.5
Green	Catherine Bennett	785	31.1	+6.4
IfD	Susan Cocking*	744	29.5	−2.2
Labour	Carralyn Paula Parkes	724	28.7	−1.3
Labour	Bernard Edward Parkes	546	21.6	−2.3
Conservative	Margaret Caroline Gadd	342	13.6	−12.3
Conservative	Ian Munro-Price	244	9.7	−14.4
Conservative	Maureen Quinn	224	8.9	−11.3
Liberal Democrats	Holly Hope	120	4.8	New
Liberal Democrats	Lee Daniel Harmsworth	75	3.0	New
Liberal Democrats	Gillian Pearson	74	2.9	New
Rejected ballots		22	0.86	
Turnout		2,544	27.24	
Registered electors		9,338		
IfD hold		Swing		
IfD hold		Swing		
Labour hold		Swing		

=== Puddletown & Lower Winterborne ===
Puddletown and Lower Winterborne
Party	Candidate	Votes	%	±%
Conservative	Emma Jayne Parker*	603	46.3	−2.2
Liberal Democrats	James Henry Lloyd	456	35.0	+11.1
Labour	Helen Badger	243	18.7	+6.9
Rejected ballots		23	1.73	
Turnout		1,326	30.74	
Registered electors		4,313		
Conservative hold		Swing		

=== Radipole ===
Radipole
Party	Candidate	Votes	%	±%
Liberal Democrats	Matt Bell	1,427	64.3	+13.0
Liberal Democrats	Louise Bown	1,123	50.6	+3.6
Labour	Pauline Crump	486	21.9	+1.3
Conservative	George Granycome	464	20.9	−6.1
Conservative	James William Farquharson	457	20.6	−5.0
Rejected ballots		23	1.03	
Turnout		2,243	30.66	
Registered electors		7,316		
Liberal Democrats hold		Swing		
Liberal Democrats hold		Swing		

=== Rodwell & Wyke ===
Rodwell and Wyke
Party	Candidate	Votes	%	±%
Green	Clare Sutton*	1,516	44.9	−4.5
Labour	Kate Wheller*	1,385	41.0	+6.9
Green	Claudia Lucienne Webb	1,327	39.3	+8.7
Green	Valerie Jane Graves	1,199	35.5	+9.7
Labour	Antony Prowse	914	27.1	+3.6
Conservative	Caroline Joyce Nickinson	825	24.4	+3.4
Conservative	Richard Douglas Nickinson	756	22.4	+0.2
Labour	Thomas Taylor	700	20.7	+0.5
Conservative	Clare Louise Williams	644	19.1	−1.2
Rejected ballots		21	0.62	
Turnout		3,398	31.69	
Registered electors		10,722		
Green hold		Swing		
Labour hold		Swing		
Green hold		Swing		

=== Shaftesbury Town ===
Shaftesbury Town
Party	Candidate	Votes	%	±%
Liberal Democrats	Derek Leslie Beer*	1,403	60.1	+9.5
Liberal Democrats	Jack David John Jeanes	1,008	43.2	+13.9
Conservative	Virginia Edwyn-Jones	558	23.9	+3.3
Independent	Andrew Reginald Hollingshead	529	22.7	+7.2
Conservative	Barry von Clemens	269	11.5	−4.9
Labour	Dan Bavister	233	10.0	+0.8
No Description	Lester Mark Dibben	187	8.0	+1.7
Patriots Alliance (English Democrats and UKIP)	Steve Unwin	118	5.1	−4.9
Patriots Alliance (English Democrats and UKIP)	Lester Taylor	86	3.7	−7.0
Rejected ballots		16	0.68	
Turnout		2,351	34.40	
Registered electors		6,835		
Liberal Democrats hold		Swing		
Liberal Democrats hold		Swing		

=== Sherborne East ===
Sherborne East
Party	Candidate	Votes	%	±%
Liberal Democrats	Jon Andrews *	838	58.1	+8.5
Conservative	Juliet May Pentolfe	502	34.8	–1.4
Green	Robert Sean Casey	103	7.1	±0.0
Majority		336	23.3	+9.9
Registered electors		3,777		
Rejected ballots		21	1.43	
Turnout		1,464	38.76	–5.74
Liberal Democrats hold		Swing	+9.2	

=== Sherborne Rural ===
Sherborne Rural
Party	Candidate	Votes	%	±%
Liberal Democrats	Robin Andrew Shane Legg *	916	60.3	+6.9
Conservative	Stephen Hillier	604	39.7	+5.2
Majority		312	20.5	
Registered electors		4,036		
Rejected ballots		18	1.17	
Turnout		1,538	38.11	–4.59
Liberal Democrats hold		Swing	+0.9	

=== Sherborne West ===
Sherborne West
Party	Candidate	Votes	%	±%
Liberal Democrats	Richard Henry Geoffrey Crabb *	575	43.9	–9.7
Conservative	Rebecca Burns	471	36.0	–2.0
Independent	Taff Martin	264	20.2	New
Majority		104	7.9	–7.7
Registered electors		3,791		
Rejected ballots		5	0.38	
Turnout		1,315	34.69	–7.71
Liberal Democrats hold		Swing	–3.9	

=== South East Purbeck ===
South East Purbeck
Party	Candidate	Votes	%	±%
Liberal Democrats	Ben Wilson	848	57.8	+40.3
Conservative	Cherry Louise Brooks*	523	35.7	+5.0
Labour	Peter Copp	95	6.5	−5.2
Rejected ballots		14	0.95	
Turnout		1,480	42.57	
Registered electors		3,477		
Liberal Democrats gain from Conservative		Swing		

=== St Leonards & St Ives ===
St Leonards and St Ives
Party	Candidate	Votes	%	±%
Conservative	Ray Bryan*	1,236	62.5	+8.6
Conservative	Barry Peter Goringe*	1,160	58.6	+3.0
Liberal Democrats	Nicola Joanne Buskell	730	36.9	+13.6
Liberal Democrats	Andrew Paul Barham	626	31.6	New
Rejected ballots		17	0.85	
Turnout		1,996	30.52	
Registered electors		6,540		
Conservative hold		Swing		
Conservative hold		Swing		

=== Stalbridge & Marnhull ===
Stalbridge and Marnhull
Party	Candidate	Votes	%	±%
Conservative	James Charles Vitali	767	51.0	+3.4
Liberal Democrats	Rosalind Sheila Eveleigh	603	40.1	+9.3
Green	Richard Harvey	133	8.8	New
Rejected ballots		18	1.18	
Turnout		1,521	34.46	
Registered electors		4,414		
Conservative hold		Swing		

=== Stour & Allen Vale ===
Stour and Allen Vale
Party	Candidate	Votes	%	±%
Liberal Democrats	Will Chakawhata	688	53.0	+29.5
Conservative	Robin David Cook*	497	38.3	−5.2
Labour	Maryanne Pike	114	8.8	+2.1
Rejected ballots		14	1.07	
Turnout		1,314	34.30	
Registered electors		3,831		
Liberal Democrats gain from Conservative		Swing		

=== Sturminster Newton ===
Sturminster Newton
Party	Candidate	Votes	%	±%
Conservative	Carole Yvonne Jones*	712	66.9	+34.4
Liberal Democrats	Kevin Nicholas Maitland-Gleed	267	25.1	−1.3
Labour	Jennifer Daultrey	85	8.0	+3.7
Rejected ballots		10	0.93	
Turnout		1,075	30.81	
Registered electors		3,489		
Conservative hold		Swing		

=== Swanage ===
Swanage
Party	Candidate	Votes	%	±%
Conservative	Gary Maurice Suttle*	1,262	39.7	−6.2
Conservative	William Stanley Trite*	1,148	36.2	−7.1
Labour	Debby Monkhouse	1,084	34.1	+10.9
Labour	Chris Bradey	789	24.9	+6.7
Independent	Philip Michael Eades	686	21.6	+1.5
Independent	Helen Mary McDavid	460	14.5	New
Liberal Democrats	Matt Piper	283	8.9	−5.0
Green	Kia Pope	215	6.8	New
Liberal Democrats	Gill Calvin Thomas	192	6.0	−11.6
Rejected ballots		33	1.03	
Turnout		3,208	40.92	
Registered electors		7,840		
Conservative hold		Swing		
Conservative hold		Swing		

=== Upwey & Broadwey ===
Upwey and Broadwey
Party	Candidate	Votes	%	±%
Liberal Democrats	David James Northam	710	55.9	+14.8
Conservative	Jan Edward Ernest Bergman	317	25.0	−15.3
Labour	Byron Silver	242	19.1	+0.5
Rejected ballots		15	1.17	
Turnout		1,283	34.04	
Registered electors		3,769		
Liberal Democrats hold		Swing		

=== Verwood ===
Verwood
Party	Candidate	Votes	%	±%
Conservative	Simon Gibson*	2,006	64.3	+0.7
Conservative	Toni Bartley Coombs*	1,918	61.5	+2.3
Conservative	Spencer Grant Flower*	1,765	56.6	+1.3
Liberal Democrats	Lindsey Dedden	857	27.5	New
Liberal Democrats	Ted Mason	707	22.7	New
Liberal Democrats	Ginette Marie Holdroyd	579	18.6	+2.5
Labour	Sandra Turner	487	15.6	+9.1
UKIP	John Baxter	220	7.1	−7.1
Rejected ballots		10	0.32	
Turnout		3,128	28.91	
Registered electors		10,819		
Conservative hold		Swing		
Conservative hold		Swing		
Conservative hold		Swing		

=== Wareham ===
Wareham
Party	Candidate	Votes	%	±%
Liberal Democrats	Beryl Rita Ezzard*	1,879	68.0	+10.9
Liberal Democrats	Ryan David Holloway*	1,710	61.8	+21.2
Conservative	Jane Newell	632	22.9	−7.1
Conservative	Victoria Stocqueler	617	22.3	−7.0
Labour	David Brian Law	361	13.1	+1.8
Rejected ballots		40	1.43	
Turnout		2,805	35.88	−5.28
Registered electors		7,818		
Liberal Democrats hold		Swing	▲8.7	
Liberal Democrats hold		Swing	▲13.9	

=== West Moors & Three Legged Cross ===
West Moors and Three Legged Cross
Party	Candidate	Votes	%	±%
Conservative	David Shortell*	1,056	50.3	−7.0
Conservative	Andy Skeats	1,054	50.2	−3.5
Liberal Democrats	Sally Christine Wallis	713	34.0	+12.0
Liberal Democrats	Peter Durant	671	32.0	+14.5
Independent	Malcolm John Hobbs	273	13.0	New
Independent	Steven Anzinger-Cooper	239	11.4	New
Rejected ballots		17	0.8	
Turnout		2,117	28.59	−4.76
Registered electors		7,404		
Conservative hold		Swing	▼9.6	
Conservative hold		Swing	▼9.1	

=== West Parley ===
West Parley
Party	Candidate	Votes	%	±%
Conservative	Andrew Charles Parry*	564	66.0	+3.5
Independent	Ann Josephine Miller	152	17.8	−2.8
Liberal Democrats	Marlies Koutstaal	139	16.3	−0.6
Rejected ballots		6	0.7	
Turnout		861	28.70	−3.4
Registered electors		3,000		
Conservative hold		Swing	▲1.9	

=== West Purbeck ===
West Purbeck
Party	Candidate	Votes	%	±%
Liberal Democrats	Michael John Baker	1,245	52.3	+30.8
Conservative	Laura Jane Beddow*	962	40.4	−3.7
Liberal Democrats	David Graham Civil	929	39.0	+24.5
Conservative	Peter Kendrick Wharf*	835	35.1	−6.0
Labour	Peter David Green	300	12.6	+0.8
Labour	David Peden	171	7.2	−3.9
Rejected ballots		17	0.71	
Turnout		2,397	33.41	+3.18
Registered electors		7,174		
Liberal Democrats gain from Conservative		Swing	▲17.2	
Conservative hold		Swing	▼15.3	

=== Westham ===
Westham
Party	Candidate	Votes	%	±%
Liberal Democrats	Ryan Dean Hope*	708	43.8	−2.3
Liberal Democrats	Alex Fuhrmann	684	42.3	−0.7
Labour	Lucy Hamilton	438	27.1	+2.9
Labour	Jon Rodd	320	19.8	−2.9
IfD	Christine Mary James	272	16.8	New
Conservative	Alexander John McGlynn	255	15.8	−3.0
Conservative	Thomas Oswald Tannassee	175	10.8	−7.0
Rejected ballots		25	1.52	
Turnout		1,643	24.04	−5.57
Registered electors		6,835		
Liberal Democrats hold		Swing	▼2.3	
Liberal Democrats hold		Swing	▲0.9	

=== Wimborne Minster ===
Wimborne Minster
Party	Candidate	Votes	%	±%
Liberal Democrats	Shane Bartlett*	1,161	62.3	−3.2
Liberal Democrats	David Morgan*	1,067	57.2	−1.2
Conservative	Sue Cook	493	26.4	+0.4
Conservative	Mike Bartlett	451	24.2	−1.5
Labour	Ashley Wynne Rowlands	283	15.2	+6.0
Rejected ballots		13	0.69	
Turnout		1,877	29.76	−6.66
Registered electors		6,307		
Liberal Democrats hold		Swing	▼2.0	
Liberal Democrats hold		Swing	▲0.1	

=== Winterborne & Broadmayne ===
Winterborne & Broadmayne
Party	Candidate	Votes	%	±%
Liberal Democrats	Roland Tarr*	747	62.1	+5.5
Conservative	Mark Penfold	314	26.1	−3.1
Reform	Graham Richard Brant	142	11.8	−2.4
Rejected ballots		10	0.82	
Turnout		1,215	34.81	−6.39
Registered electors		3,490		
Liberal Democrats hold		Swing	▲4.2	

=== Winterborne North ===
Winterborne North
Party	Candidate	Votes	%	±%
Liberal Democrats	Barrie George Cooper	663	54.6	+28.6
Conservative	Steve O'Connell	444	36.6	−3.3
Labour	Haydn White	107	8.8	+1.5
Rejected ballots		23	1.85	
Turnout		1,240	32.84	−9.06
Registered electors		3,776		
Liberal Democrats gain from Conservative		Swing	▲15.8	

=== Yetminster ===
Yetminster
Party	Candidate	Votes	%	±%
Liberal Democrats	Chris Kippax	813	47.7	+12.2
Conservative	Diane Elizabeth Howell	752	44.1	−8.8
Green	Stuart Martin	139	8.2	New
Rejected ballots		10	0.58	
Turnout		1,714	42.08	−1.38
Registered electors		4,073		
Liberal Democrats gain from Conservative		Swing	▲10.5	

== Changes 2024–2029 ==
=== By-elections ===
==== Swanage ====
Swanage by-election: 24 July 2025
Party	Candidate	Votes	%	±%
Conservative	Christopher Tomes	1,254	35.3	–0.5
Reform	John Lejeune	748	21.0	N/A
Liberal Democrats	Poppy Maltby	737	20.7	+12.7
IfD	Philip Eades	415	11.7	N/A
Labour	Gemma Simmons	400	11.3	–19.4
Majority		506	14.3	N/A
Turnout		3,558	45.4	+4.5
Registered electors		7,843		
Conservative hold				

The by-election was triggered by the death of the sitting Local Conservatives councillor, Bill Trite.

==== Bridport ====
Bridport by-election: 21 May 2026
Party	Candidate	Votes	%	±%
Liberal Democrats	Paddy Mooney	2,190	43.6	+2.1
Reform	Jason Holt	1,164	23.2	N/A
Green	Kelvin Charles Clayton	1,011	20.1	–17.5
Conservative	Una Mary Christopher	656	13.1	–6.9
Majority		1,026	20.4	N/A
Turnout		5,038	42.62	+7.55
Registered electors		11,820		
Liberal Democrats hold				

The by-election was triggered by the death of the sitting Liberal Democrat councillor, Dave Bolwell.

==== St Leonards and St Ives ====
St Leonards and St Ives by-election: 2 July 2026
Party	Candidate	Votes	%	±%
Conservative	Margaret Elizabeth Goringe	928	37.9	−20.7
Reform	Philip Leach	823	33.6	N/A
Liberal Democrats	Andrew Paul Barham	629	25.7	−5.9
Green	Mark Hamilton Keith	68	2.8	N/A
Majority		105	4.3	N/A
Rejected ballots		4	0.16	
Turnout		2,452	37.45	
Registered electors		6,548		
Conservative hold				

The by-election was triggered by the death of the sitting Local Conservatives councillor, Barry Goringe, on 8 April 2026.
