= Lyme and Charmouth =

Electoral ward in Dorset, England

- ward Dorset Council
- Population: 5,142
- Major settlements: Lyme Regis and Charmouth

Current ward
- Created: 2019
- Councillor: Belinda Bawden (Green Party of England and Wales)
- Number of councillors: 1

Lyme and Charmouth is an electoral ward in Dorset. Since 2019, the ward has elected 1 councillor to Dorset Council.

== Geography ==
The Lyme and Charmouth ward is in the far west of Dorset and contains the towns of Lyme Regis and Charmouth.

== Councillors ==
Election	Councillors
2019	Daryl Whane Turner (Conservative)
2022	Belinda Bawden (Green)
2024	Belinda Bawden (Green)

== Election ==
=== 2024 Dorset Council election ===
2024 Dorset Council election: Lyme and Charmouth (1 seat)
Party	Candidate	Votes	%	±%
Green	Belinda Bawden*	884	61.0	+46.2
Conservative	Michaela Louise Ellis	380	26.2	−13.9
Liberal Democrats	Paddy Mooney	103	7.1	New
Labour	David Hart	83	5.7	−7.0
Turnout		1,450	35.92	
Green gain from Conservative		Swing		

=== 2022 by-election ===
Belinda Bawden won the 2022 by-election.

Lyme and Charmouth by-election 7 April 2022
Party	Candidate	Votes	%	±%
Green	Belinda Bawden	594	43.8	+27.0
Conservative	Vicci Stocqueler	359	26.5	−13.6
Independent	Cheryl Reynolds	320	23.6	−6.7
Labour	David Hart	82	6.1	−6.6
Majority		235	17.3	
Turnout		1,355		
Green gain from Conservative		Swing		

=== 2019 Dorset Council election ===
2019 Dorset Council election: Lyme and Charmouth (1 seat)
Party	Candidate	Votes	%	±%
Conservative	Daryl Whane Turner	756	40.1	
Independent	Cheryl Lesley Reynolds	571	30.3	
Green	Rob Smith	317	16.8	
Labour	Rikey Austin	239	12.7	
Majority				
Turnout			44.90	
Conservative win (new seat)				

== See also ==
- List of electoral wards in Dorset
