= Colehill and Wimborne Minster East =

Electoral ward in Dorset, England

- ward Dorset Council
- Population: 9,105

Current ward
- Created: 2024
- Councillor: Andy Todd (Liberal Democrats)
- Councillor: Rajinder Atwal (Liberal Democrats)
- Number of councillors: 2

Colehill and Wimborne Minster East is an electoral ward in Dorset. Since 2019, the ward has elected 2 councillors to Dorset Council.

== Geography ==
The Colehill and Wimborne Minster East ward covers the Colehill area as well as eastern parts of Wimborne Minster. The southern areas of Furzehill are also in the ward.

== Councillors ==
Election	Councillors	
2019	Janet Dover (Liberal Democrats)	Maria Roe (Liberal Democrats)
2024	Andy Todd (Liberal Democrats)	Jindy Atwal (Liberal Democrats)

== Election ==
=== 2019 Dorset Council election ===
2019 Dorset Council election: Colehill and Wimborne Minster East (2 seats)
Party	Candidate	Votes	%	±%
Liberal Democrats	Janet Dover	1,616	57.4	
Liberal Democrats	Maria Angela Roe	1,073	38.1	
Conservative	KD Johnson	968	34.4	
Conservative	David Geoffrey Lawson Packer	771	27.4	
Green	Derek Baker	477	17.0	
UKIP	Nick Wellstead	319	11.3	
Labour	David Francis Moore	145	5.2	
Majority				
Turnout		2,814	41.26	
Liberal Democrats win (new seat)				
Liberal Democrats win (new seat)				

=== 2024 Dorset Council election ===
Colehill & Wimborne Minster East
Party	Candidate	Votes	%	±%
Liberal Democrats	Andrew Thomas Todd	1,275	48.0	−9.4
Liberal Democrats	Jindy Atwal	1,168	44.0	+5.9
Conservative	KD Johnson	940	35.4	+1.0
Conservative	Carol Lynda Butter	764	28.8	+1.4
Independent	Emma Urquhart	578	21.8	New
Labour	David Moore	215	8.1	+2.9
Turnout		2,656	36.72	
Liberal Democrats hold		Swing		
Liberal Democrats hold		Swing		

== See also ==
- List of electoral wards in Dorset
