= Sherborne East (ward) =

Electoral ward in Dorset, England

- ward Dorset Council
- Population: 4,766
- Major settlements: Sherborne

Current ward
- Created: 2019
- Councillor: Jon Andrews (Liberal Democrat)
- Number of councillors: 1

Sherborne East is an electoral ward in Dorset. Since 2019, the ward has elected 1 councillor to Dorset Council.

== Geography ==
The Sherborne East ward covers the eastern areas of the town of Sherborne.

== Councillors ==
Election	Councillors
2019	Jon Andrews (Liberal Democrat)
2024	Jon Andrews (Liberal Democrat)

== Election ==
=== 2019 Dorset Council election ===
2019 Dorset Council election: Sherborne East (1 seat)
Party	Candidate	Votes	%	±%
Liberal Democrats	Jon Andrews	842	49.6	
Conservative	Jill Warburton	615	36.2	
UKIP	Alan Gordon Taylor	122	7.2	
Green	Ken Huggins	120	7.1	
Majority				
Turnout			44.50	
Liberal Democrats win (new seat)				

=== 2024 Dorset Council election ===
Sherborne East
Party	Candidate	Votes	%	±%
Liberal Democrats	Jon Andrews *	838	58.1	+8.5
Conservative	Juliet May Pentolfe	502	34.8	–1.4
Green	Robert Sean Casey	103	7.1	±0.0
Majority		336	23.3	+9.9
Registered electors		3,777		
Turnout		1,443	38.76	–5.74
Liberal Democrats hold		Swing	+9.2	

== See also ==
- List of electoral wards in Dorset
