= Sturminster Newton (ward) =

Electoral ward in Dorset, England

- ward Dorset Council
- Population: 4,773
- Major settlements: Sturminster Newton

Current ward
- Created: 2019
- Councillor: Carole Yvonne Jones (Conservative)
- Number of councillors: 1

Sturminster Newton is an electoral ward in Dorset, England. Since the 2019 Dorset Council election, it has elected one councillor to Dorset Council.

== Geography ==
The Sturminster Newton ward contains the town of Sturminster Newton.

== Councillors ==
| Election | Councillors |
|---|---|
| 2019 | Carole Yvonne Jones (Conservative) |
| 2024 | Carole Yvonne Jones (Conservative) |

== Election ==
=== 2019 Dorset Council election ===
2019 Dorset Council election: Sturminster Newton (1 seat)
| Party | Candidate | Votes | % | ±% |
|---|---|---|---|---|
| Conservative | Carole Yvonne Jones | 442 | 32.5 | |
| Independent | Michael Roake | 399 | 29.3 | |
| Liberal Democrats | David Fox | 360 | 26.4 | |
| UKIP | Sam Edmunds | 102 | 7.5 | |
| Labour | Craig Andrew White | 59 | 4.3 | |
| Majority | | | | |
| Turnout | | | 38.70 | |
| Conservative win (new seat) | | | | |

=== 2024 Dorset Council election ===
Sturminster Newton
| Party | Candidate | Votes | % | ±% |
|---|---|---|---|---|
| Conservative | Carole Yvonne Jones* | 712 | 66.9 | +34.4 |
| Liberal Democrats | Kevin Nicholas Maitland-Gleed | 267 | 25.1 | −1.3 |
| Labour | Jennifer Daultrey | 85 | 8.0 | +3.7 |
| Turnout | | 1,064 | 30.81 | |
| Conservative hold | | Swing | | |

== See also ==
- List of electoral wards in Dorset
