= Holt Heath, Dorset =

Common land in Dorset, England

Coordinates: 50.8363°N 1.9171°W

Holt and West Moors Heaths SSSI
- Site of Special Scientific Interest
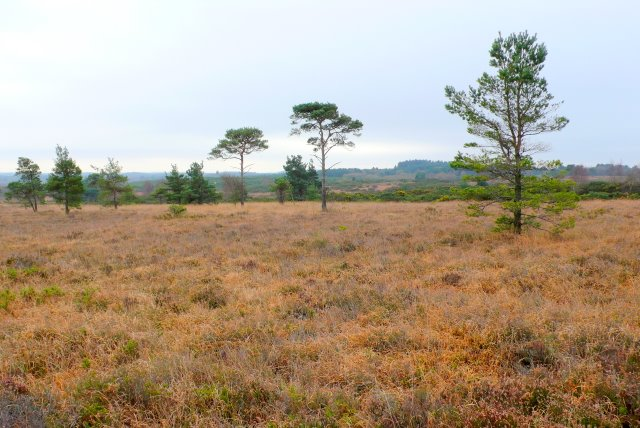
- Location of Holt and West Moors Heaths SSSI.
- Area of search: Dorset
- Grid reference: SU030058, SU060040, SU096070
- Interest: Biological
- Area: 766 ha (1,890 acres)
- Notification date: 1977

Holt Heath is a 4.88 square kilometres (1.88 sq mi) common situated four miles north-east of Wimborne Minster in east Dorset, southern England, close to the village of Holt. The reserve includes dry and wet heathland, bog and ancient woodland. The common has several nature conservation designations: national nature reserve, Special Protection Area, Special Area of Conservation and Site of Special Scientific Interest. It is owned by the National Trust and managed in association with Natural England. The heath is one of the few places where all six native British reptile species occur, and it also supports many other heathland animals, plants and birds. Rare heathland birds such as Eurasian Hobby, nightjar, Dartford warbler and woodlark have been recorded as breeding on the reserve.

As a common, historically it was grazed by livestock owned by local people; as with other heathlands it was this grazing which created and maintained the open habitat. Grazing ceased in the mid-20th century, leading to long-term deterioration in the structure and composition of the habitat. Plans are under way to install cattle grids on the minor roads crossing the heath, and then to begin grazing again.
