= Bridport (ward) =

Electoral ward in Dorset, England

- ward Dorset Council
- Population: 14,645
- Major settlements: Bridport

Current ward
- Created: 2019
- Councillor: Sarah Williams (Liberal Democrats)
- Councillor: Bridget Bolwell (Liberal Democrats)
- Councillor: Vacant (Vacant)
- Number of councillors: 3

Bridport is an electoral ward in Dorset. Since 2019, the ward has elected 3 councillors to Dorset Council.

== Geography ==
The Bridport ward covers the civil parishes of Bridport (including Allington, Coneygar, Bothenhampton, Bradpole and West Bay) and Symondsbury (including Eype) in west Dorset.

== Councillors ==
Election	Councillors		
2019	Kelvin Charles Clayton (Green)	Sarah Williams (Liberal Democrats)	Dave Bolwell (Liberal Democrats)
2024	Bridget Bolwell (Liberal Democrats)	Sarah Williams (Liberal Democrats)	Dave Bolwell (Liberal Democrats)

== Election ==
=== 2026 Bridport by-election ===
Following the death of Liberal Democrat councillor Dave Bolwell, a by-election was held on the 21st of May 2026 to elect his successor.

2026 Bridport by-election: Bridport (1 seat)
Party	Candidate	Votes	%	±%
Liberal Democrats	Paddy Mooney	2,190	43.6	+2.1
Reform	Jason Holt	1164	23.2	New
Green	Kelvin Clayton	1011	20.1	−17.5
Conservative	Una Christopher	656	13.1	−6.7
Turnout		5032	42.62	+7.55
Liberal Democrats hold		Swing		

=== 2024 Dorset Council election ===
2024 Dorset Council election: Bridport (3 seats)
Party	Candidate	Votes	%	±%
Liberal Democrats	Sarah Williams*	1,726	41.5	−0.8
Liberal Democrats	Dave Bolwell*	1,646	39.6	+6.3
Liberal Democrats	Bridget Bolwell	1,587	38.2	+18.2
Green	Kelvin Charles Clayton*	1,562	37.6	+1.7
Green	Julian Stephen Langton Jones	1,166	28.0	New
Green	Bob Hamblett	880	21.2	New
Conservative	Una Christopher	832	20.0	−6.2
Labour	Steven Rose	760	18.3	+1.0
Conservative	Anna Louise Cox	754	18.1	−7.3
Conservative	Frances Kathleen McKenzie	747	18.0	−5.3
Turnout		4,158	35.07	
Liberal Democrats hold		Swing		
Liberal Democrats gain from Green		Swing		
Liberal Democrats hold		Swing		

=== 2019 Dorset Council election ===
2019 Dorset Council election: Bridport (3 seats)
Party	Candidate	Votes	%	±%
Liberal Democrats	Sarah Williams	1,891	42.3	
Green	Kelvin Charles Clayton	1,606	35.9	
Liberal Democrats	Dave Bolwell	1,489	33.3	
Conservative	Derek Raymond Bussell	1,172	26.2	
Conservative	Ronald William Coatsworth	1,138	25.4	
Conservative	Una Mary Christopher	1,040	23.3	
Liberal Democrats	Iain Douglas Young	893	20.0	
Labour	Nick Boothroyd	773	17.3	
Labour	Mark Gage	734	16.4	
UKIP	Heath Barrett	643	14.4	
Labour	Bill Mellish	630	14.1	
Majority				
Turnout		4,473	37.37	
Liberal Democrats win (new seat)				
Green win (new seat)				
Liberal Democrats win (new seat)				

== See also ==
- List of electoral wards in Dorset
