= Beacon (ward) =

Electoral ward in Dorset, England

- ward Dorset Council
- Population: 5,150
- Major settlements: Compton Abbas

Current ward
- Created: 2019
- Councillor: Jane Somper (Conservative)
- Number of councillors: 1

Beacon is an electoral ward in Dorset. Since 2019, the ward has elected 1 councillor to Dorset Council.

== Geography ==
The Beacon ward is rural and contains the civil parishes of Ashmore, Cann, Compton Abbas, East Orchard, Fontmell Magna, Guy's Marsh, Hammoon, Iwerne Courtney, Iwerne Minster, Iwerne Stepleton, Manston, Margaret Marsh, Melbury Abbas, Stour Provost, Stour Row, Sutton Waldron, Todber, West Orchard.

== Councillors ==
Election	Councillors
2019	Jane Somper (Conservative)
2024	Jane Somper (Conservative)

== Election ==
=== 2024 Dorset Council election ===
Beacon
Party	Candidate	Votes	%	±%
Conservative	Jane Somper*	898	61.3	−3.1
Liberal Democrats	Claire Elizabeth Reed	307	20.9	−5.8
Labour	Gillian Clare Cross	133	9.1	+0.1
Green	Sheila Healy	125	8.5	New
Rejected ballots		5	0.34	
Turnout		1,466	38.32	
Registered electors		3,826		
Conservative hold		Swing		

=== 2019 Dorset Council election ===
2019 Dorset Council election: Beacon (1 seat)
Party	Candidate	Votes	%	±%
Conservative	Jane Somper	1,020	64.4	
Liberal Democrats	Alexandra Gale	423	26.7	
Labour	Samuel Charles Skey	142	9.0	
Majority		597	37.7	
Turnout			42.60	
Conservative win (new seat)				

== See also ==
- List of electoral wards in Dorset
