= Stour and Allen Vale =

Electoral ward in Dorset, England

- ward Dorset Council
- Population: 5,185
- Major settlements: Chalbury, Holt, Shapwick, Sturminster Marshall

Current ward
- Created: 2019
- Councillor: Will Chakawhata (Liberal Democrats)
- Number of councillors: 1

Stour and Allen Vale is an electoral ward in Dorset, England. Since the 2019 Dorset Council election, it has elected one councillor to Dorset Council.

== Geography ==
The Stour and Allen Vale ward is rural and is named after the River Stour and the River Allen. The ward is located between Wimborne Minster and Ferndown to the south, Verwood to the north east and Blandford Forum to the north west. It contains the civil parish of Hinton and the villages of Chalbury, Holt, Shapwick.

== Councillors ==
Election	Councillors
2019	Robin Cook (Conservative)
2024	Will Chakawhata (Liberal Democrats)

== Election ==
=== 2019 Dorset Council election ===
2019 Dorset Council election: Stour and Allen Vale (1 seat)
Party	Candidate	Votes	%	±%
Conservative	Robin David Cook	606	43.5	
Liberal Democrats	Joanna Jane Bury	328	23.5	
Independent	Francis Edward Raven-Vause	201	14.4	
UKIP	Michael Simmons	165	11.8	
Labour	Stephen Gerry	94	6.7	
Majority				
Turnout			35.80	
Conservative win (new seat)				

=== 2024 Dorset Council election ===
Stour & Allen Vale
Party	Candidate	Votes	%	±%
Liberal Democrats	Will Chakawhata	688	53.0	+29.5
Conservative	Robin David Cook*	497	38.3	−5.2
Labour	Maryanne Pike	114	8.8	+2.1
Turnout		1,299	34.30	
Liberal Democrats gain from Conservative		Swing		

== See also ==
- List of electoral wards in Dorset
