= Sherborne West (ward) =

Electoral ward in Dorset, England

- ward Dorset Council
- Population: 5,047
- Major settlements: Sherborne

Current ward
- Created: 2019
- Councillor: Richard Crabb (Liberal Democrat)
- Number of councillors: 1

Sherborne West is an electoral ward in Dorset. Since 2019, the ward has elected 1 councillor to Dorset Council.

== History ==
In 2023, Matt Hall was elected councillor in Exmouth, Devon and so resigned. He was succeeded by fellow Liberal Democrat Richard Crabb.

== Geography ==
The Sherborne West ward covers the western areas of the town of Sherborne.

== Councillors ==
Election	Councillors
2019	Matt Hall (Liberal Democrat)
2023	Richard Henry Geoffrey Crabb (Liberal Democrat)
2024	Richard Henry Geoffrey Crabb (Liberal Democrat)

== Election ==
=== 2024 Dorset Council election ===
Sherborne West
Party	Candidate	Votes	%	±%
Liberal Democrats	Richard Henry Geoffrey Crabb *	575	43.9	–9.7
Conservative	Rebecca Burns	471	36.0	–2.0
Independent	Taff Martin	264	20.2	New
Majority		104	7.9	–7.7
Registered electors		3,791		
Turnout		1,310	34.69	–7.71
Liberal Democrats hold		Swing	–3.9	

=== 2023 by-election ===
Richard Crabb was elected.

Sherborne West by-election 29 June 2023
Party	Candidate	Votes	%	±%
Liberal Democrats	Richard Crabb	589	50.8	−2.8
Conservative	Becky Burns	489	42.2	+4.2
Labour	Nick Boothroyd	81	7.0	+7.0
Majority		100	8.6	
Turnout		1,159		
Liberal Democrats hold		Swing		

=== 2019 Dorset Council election ===
2019 Dorset Council election: Sherborne West (1 seat)
Party	Candidate	Votes	%	±%
Liberal Democrats	Matt Hall	759	53.6	
Conservative	Rebecca Burns	538	38.0	
Green	Pam Rosling	119	8.4	
Majority				
Turnout			42.40	
Liberal Democrats win (new seat)				

== See also ==
- List of electoral wards in Dorset
