= Holt, Dorset =

Village in Dorset, England

Coordinates: 50.834°N 1.960°W

Holt
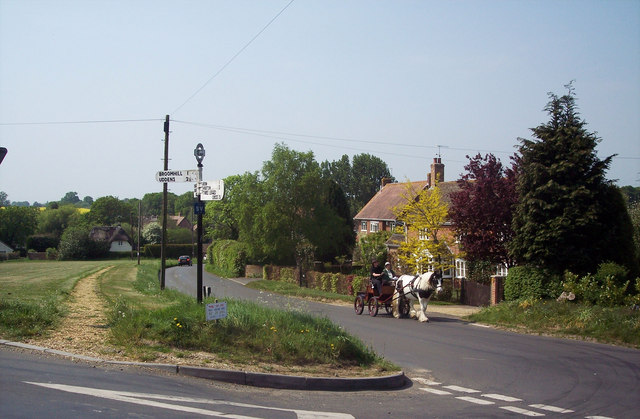
- Village Green, Holt

- Location within Dorset
- OS grid reference: SU029038
- Civil parish: Holt
- Unitary authority: Dorset
- Ceremonial county: Dorset
- Region: South West
- Country: England
- Sovereign state: United Kingdom
- Post town: WIMBORNE
- Postcode district: BH21
- Dialling code: 01202
- Police: Dorset
- Fire: Dorset and Wiltshire
- Ambulance: South Western
- UK Parliament: North Dorset

Holt is a village in east Dorset, England, 2 miles (3.2 km) north of Wimborne Minster. The village had a population of 1,265 in 2001. The electoral ward of the same name had a population of 2,286 at the 2011 census. It also includes Hinton Martell and Horton.

Holt gives its name to Holt Heath, a nearby large heathland common, owned by the National Trust and designated as a national nature reserve.

The village has a football team called Holt United which plays in the Dorset Premier League.

According to the 1901 UK census, Lieutenant-General John Plumptre Carr Glyn KCB, who had fought in the Crimean War, the Anglo-Ashanti War and the Anglo-Zulu War retired to Holt with his wife Belgian born Ellen.

Holt also boasts two popular community halls, Holt Parish Hall (built in 1935) and Holt Village Hall (the former School built in the 1840s).

== Governance ==
In the UK national parliament, Holt is within the North Dorset parliamentary constituency.

After 2019 structural changes to local government in England, Holt is part of the Stour and Allen Vale ward which elects 1 member to Dorset Council.
