= Compton Abbas =

Village and civil parish in Dorset, England

Coordinates: 50.9655°N 2.1885°W

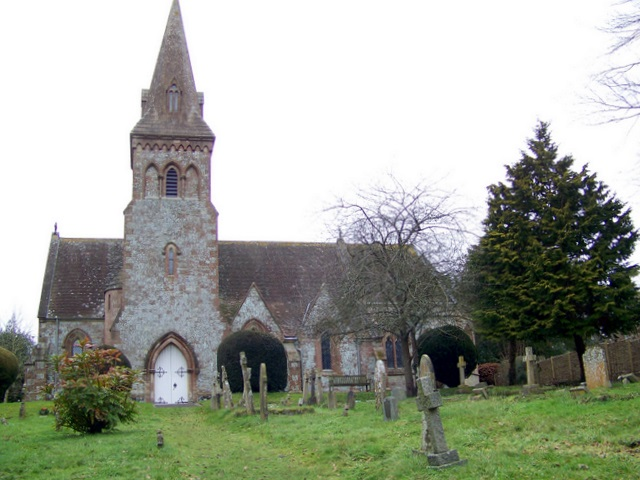
- St Mary's Church, Compton Abbas

- Location within Dorset
- Population: 216 (2011)
- OS grid reference: ST869184
- Civil parish: Compton Abbas
- Unitary authority: Dorset
- Ceremonial county: Dorset
- Region: South West
- Country: England
- Sovereign state: United Kingdom
- Post town: SHAFTESBURY
- Postcode district: SP7
- Dialling code: 01747
- Police: Dorset
- Fire: Dorset and Wiltshire
- Ambulance: South Western
- UK Parliament: North Dorset

Compton Abbas is a village and civil parish in north Dorset, England. It lies 3 miles (5 kilometres) south of the town of Shaftesbury. It is sited on greensand strata on the edge of the Blackmore Vale, below the chalk downs of Cranborne Chase. On top of these hills is Compton Abbas Airfield. The A350 road between Wiltshire and the south coast passes through the village. In the 2011 census the civil parish had a population of 216. The name Compton Abbas derives from the Saxon "cumb-ton", meaning 'village in a narrow valley', plus "abbas" which refers to Shaftesbury Abbey (the land was owned by the abbess). The church, St. Mary's, was built in 1866 to replace the older structure which was more remote from the village.

== Places of interest ==
The tower of the Church of St Mary in East Compton is a Grade I listed building.

== Politics ==
Compton Abbas is part of the North Dorset constituency for elections to the Parliament of the United Kingdom.

Compton Abbas is part of the Beacon ward for elections to Dorset Council.
