= List of electoral wards in Dorset =

This is a list of electoral divisions and wards in the ceremonial county of Dorset in South West England. All changes since the re-organisation of local government following the passing of the Local Government Act 1972 are shown. The number of councillors elected for each electoral division or ward is shown in brackets.

== Unitary authority councils ==
=== Dorset ===

Wards from 2 May 2019 to present:

Ward	Population (2021)	Councillors	Areas
Beacon	5,168	1	Ashmore, Cann, Compton Abbas, East Orchard, Fontmell Magna, Guy's Marsh, Hammoon, Iwerne Courtney, Iwerne Minster, Iwerne Stepleton, Manston, Margaret Marsh, Melbury Abbas, Stour Provost, Stour Row, Sutton Waldron, Todber, West Orchard
Beaminster	4,258	1	Beaminster, Chedington, Mapperton, Mosterton, South Perrott
Blackmore Vale	4,502	1	Fifehead Neville, Hazelbury Bryan, Ibberton, Lydlinch, Mappowder, Okeford Fitzpaine, Pulham, Shillingstone, Stoke Wake, Woolland
Blandford	10,359	2	Blandford Forum
Bridport	14,635	3	Bridport, Symondsbury
Chalk Valleys	4,788	1	Alton Pancras, Buckland Newton, Cerne Abbas, Cheselbourne, Dewlish, Godmanstone, Hilton, Minterne Magna, Nether Cerne, Piddlehinton, Piddletrenthide, Sydling St Nicholas, Up Cerne
Charminster St Mary's	5,165	1	Bradford Peverell, Charminster, Charlton Down, Frampton, Stinsford, Stratton
Chesil Bank	3,933	1	Abbotsbury, Burton Bradstock, Chilcombe, Fleet, Kingston Russell, Langton Herring, Littlebredy, Litton Cheney, Long Bredy, Portesham, Puncknowle, Shipton Gorge
Chickerell	7,817	1	Chickerell
Colehill and Wimborne Minster East	8,676	2	Colehill, east Wimborne Minster
Corfe Mullen	10,374	2	Corfe Mullen
Cranborne and Alderholt	5,029	1	Alderholt, Cranborne, Edmondsham, Wimborne St Giles, Woodlands
Cranborne Chase	5,180	1	Crichel, Gussage All Saints, Gussage St Michael, Langton Long Blandford, Sixpenny Handley and Pentridge, Tarrant Crawford, Tarrant Keyneston, Tarrant Launceston, Tarrant Monkton, Tarrant Rushton, Witchampton
Crossways	3,736	1	Crossways, Osmington, Owermoigne, Poxwell, Warmwell
Dorchester East	8,219	2	Eastern Dorchester
Dorchester Poundbury	4,072	1	Poundbury
Dorchester West	9,067	2	Western Dorchester
Eggardon	5,298	1	Askerswell, Cattistock, Chilfrome, Compton Valence, Frome St Quintin, Hooke, Loders, Maiden Newton, Netherbury, North Poorton, Powerstock, Rampisham, Toller Fratrum, Toller Porcorum, West Compton, Wraxall, Wynford Eagle
Ferndown North	8,692	2	Northern Ferndown
Ferndown South	8,805	2	Southern Ferndown
Gillingham	15,528	3	Bourton, Buckhorn Weston, East Stour, Gillingham, Kington Magna, Motcombe, West Stour
Hill Forts and Upper Tarrants	4,979	1	Bryanston, Chettle, Child Okeford, Durweston, Farnham, Hanford, Pimperne, Stourpaine, Tarrant Gunville, Tarrant Hinton
Littlemoor and Preston	9,865	2	Littlemoor and Preston
Lyme and Charmouth	5,079	1	Lyme Regis and Charmouth
Lytchett Matravers and Upton	12,537	3	Lytchett Matravers, Lytchett Minster, Morden, Upton
Marshwood Vale	4,562	1	Bettiscombe, Broadwindsor, Burstock, Catherston Leweston, Chideock, Marshwood, Seaborough, Stanton St Gabriel, Stoke Abbott, Thorncombe, Wootton Fitzpaine
Melcombe Regis	4,299	1	Melcombe Regis
Portland	13,558	3	Isle of Portland
Puddletown and Lower Winterborne	5,491	1	Athelhampton, Burleston, Milborne St Andrew, Puddletown, Tolpuddle, Winterborne Kingston, Winterborne Whitechurch, Winterborne Zelston
Radipole	9,768	2	Radipole
Rodwell and Wyke	13,916	3	Rodwell and Wyke Regis
Shaftesbury Town	9,160	2	Shaftesbury
Sherborne East	4,389	1	Eastern Sherborne
Sherborne Rural	4,952	1	Beer Hackett, Bishop's Caundle, Bradford Abbas, Caundle Marsh, Clifton Maybank, Folke, Glanvilles Wootton, Goathill, Haydon, Holwell, Nether Compton, North Wootton, Oborne, Over Compton, Poyntington, Purse Caundle, Sandford Orcas, Thornford, Trent
Sherborne West	5,972	1	Western Sherborne
South East Purbeck	4,132	1	Church Knowle, Corfe Castle, East Holme, East Stoke, Kimmeridge, Langton Matravers, Steeple with Tyneham, Studland, Worth Matravers
St Leonards and St Ives	7,903	1	St Leonards and St Ives
Stalbridge and Marnhull	5,152	1	Marnhull, Stalbridge, Stourton Caundle
Stour and Allen Vale	4,963	1	Chalbury, Holt, Horton, Pamphill, Shapwick, Sturminster Marshall
Sturminster Newton	4,633	1	Hinton St Mary, Sturminster Newton
Swanage	9,426	2	Swanage
Upwey and Broadwey	4,537	1	Upwey and Broadwey
Verwood	13,709	3	Verwood
Wareham	9,855	2	Arne, Wareham, Wareham St Martin
Westham	9,503	2	Westham
West Moors and Three Legged Cross	8,870	2	West Moors and Three Legged Cross
West Parley	3,660	1	West Parley
West Purbeck	9,844	2	Affpuddle, Bere Regis, Bloxworth, Chaldon Herring, Coombe Keynes, East Lulworth, Moreton, West Lulworth, Wool
Wimborne Minster	8,097	2	Wimborne Minster
Winterborne and Broadmayne	4,286	1	Bincombe, Broadmayne, Tincleton, West Knighton, West Stafford, Whitcombe, Winterbourne Abbas, Winterborne Came, Winterborne Herringston, Winterborne Monkton, Winterborne St Martin, Winterbourne Steepleton, Woodsford
Winterborne North	4,263	1	Blandford St Mary, Charlton Marshall, Spetisbury, Turnworth, Winterborne Clenston, Winterborne Houghton, Winterborne Stickland
Yetminster	4,911	1	Batcombe, Chetnole, Corscombe, East Chelborough, Evershot, Halstock, Hermitage, Hilfield, Holnest, Leigh, Leweston, Lillington, Longburton, Melbury Osmond, Melbury Sampford, Ryme Intrinseca, Stockwood, West Chelborough, Yetminster

=== Bournemouth, Christchurch and Poole ===

Wards from 2 May 2019 to present:

Ward	Population (2021)	Councillors	Map	Areas
Alderney and Bourne Valley	16,685	3		Alderney, Bourne Valley, Alder Hills, northern Rossmore
Bearwood and Merley	14,028	3		Bearwood, Knighton Heath, Merley
Boscombe East and Pokesdown	11,197	2		Eastern Boscombe, Pokesdown
Boscombe West	10,585	2		Western Boscombe
Bournemouth Central	16,220	2		Bournemouth Town Centre, Lansdowne, Richmond Hill.
Broadstone	10,284	2		Broadstone
Burton and Grange	9,320	2		Burton, Hoburne Park, Somerford, Winkton
Canford Cliffs	9,367	2		Canford Cliffs, Branksome Park, Lilliput, Sandbanks
Canford Heath	14,382	3		Canford Heath, Fleetsbridge
Christchurch Town	10,289	2		Christchurch Town Centre, Portfield, Purewell
Commons	10,329	2		Bournemouth International Airport, East Parley, Jumpers Common, Fairmile, Hurn, Parley Common
Creekmoor	9,463	2		Creekmoor, Waterloo
East Cliff and Springbourne	17,213	3		East Cliff, Springbourne
East Southbourne and Tuckton	8,810	2		Hengistbury Head, Southbourne, Tuckton, Warren Hill
Hamworthy	14,209	3		Hamworthy
Highcliffe and Walkford	10,008	2		Highcliffe, Walkford
Kinson	17,795	3		East Howe, Kinson, and Turbary Park, West Howe
Littledown and Iford	9,897	2		Kings Park, Littledown, Iford
Moordown	10,523	2		Charminster, Moordown
Mudeford, Stanpit and West Highcliffe	10,185	2		Friars Cliff, western Highcliffe-on-Sea, Mudeford, Stanpit
Muscliff and Strouden Park	16,874	3		Holdenhurst, Muscliff, Strouden Park, Townsend, Throop, Woodbury
Newtown and Heatherlands	17,731	3		Heatherlands, Newtown, Rossmore
Oakdale	11,194	2		Oakdale, Stanley Green
Parkstone	10,996	2		Parkstone
Penn Hill	11,550	2		Penn Hill
Poole Town	12,662	3		Baiter Park, Longfleet, Poole Town Centre
Queen's Park	11,383	2		Malmesbury Park, Queen's Park, Richmond Park
Redhill and Northbourne	9,868	2		East Howe, northern Ensbury Park, Hill View, Northbourne, Redhill
Talbot and Branksome Woods	13,682	3		Branksome Woods and Meyrick Park, Talbot Woods, parts of Talbot Village and Charminster
Wallisdown and Winton West	10,829	2		Ensbury Park, south Redhill, Slades Farm, Talbot Village, Victoria Park, Wallisdown, western Winton
Westbourne and West Cliff	10,326	2		Westbourne and West Cliff
West Southbourne	10,437	2		Western Southbourne
Winton East	11,830	2		Eastern Winton

== Former county council ==
=== Dorset ===
Electoral Divisions from 1 April 1974 (first election 12 April 1973) to 2 May 1985:

1. Beaminster Rural No. 1 (1)
2. Beaminster Rural No. 2 (1)
3. Blandford (1)
4. Blandford Rural No. 1 (1)
5. Blandford Rural No. 2 (1)
6. Bournemouth (Boscombe East) (1)
7. Bournemouth (Boscombe West) (1)
8. Bournemouth (Central) (1)
9. Bournemouth (East Cliff) (1)
10. Bournemouth (Kings Park) (2)
11. Bournemouth (Kinson North) (2)
12. Bournemouth (Kinson South) (2)
13. Bournemouth (Moordown North) (2)
14. Bournemouth (Moordown South) (1)
15. Bournemouth (Queens Park) (2)
16. Bournemouth (Redhill Park) (2)
17. Bournemouth (Southbourne) (2)
18. Bournemouth (West Cliff) (2)
19. Bournemouth (West Southbourne) (1)
20. Bournemouth (Westbourne) (2)
21. Bournemouth (Winton) (1)
22. Bridport (1)
23. Bridport Rural (1)
24. Christchurch No. 1 (Central) (1)
25. Christchurch No. 2 (Highcliffe East (1)
26. Christchurch No. 3 (Highcliffe West (1)
27. Christchurch No. 4 (Mudeford) (1)
28. Christchurch No. 5 (1)
29. Christchurch No. 6 (1)
30. Dorchester No. 1 (West) (1)
31. Dorchester No. 2 (1)
32. Dorchester Rural No. 1 (1)
33. Dorchester Rural No. 2 (1)
34. Dorchester Rural No. 3 (1)
35. Lyme Regis (1)
36. Poole No. 1 (1)
37. Poole No. 2 (East) (1)
38. Poole No. 2 (West) (1)
39. Poole No. 3 (North) (1)
40. Poole No. 3 (South) (1)
41. Poole No. 4 (North) (1)
42. Poole No. 4 (South) (1)
43. Poole No. 5 (North) (1)
44. Poole No. 5 (South) (1)
45. Poole No. 6 (1)
46. Poole No. 7 (1)
47. Poole No. 8 (North) (1)
48. Poole No. 8 (South) (1)
49. Poole No. 9 (North) (1)
50. Poole No. 9 (South) (1)
51. Poole No. 10 (North) (1)
52. Poole No. 10 (South) (1)
53. Portland (2)
54. Ringwood & Fordingbridge (1)
55. Shaftesbury (1)
56. Shaftesbury Rural (1)
57. Sherborne (1)
58. Sherborne Rural (1)
59. Sturminster Rural No. 1 (1)
60. Sturminster Rural No. 2 (1)
61. Swanage (1)
62. Wareham (1)
63. Wareham & Purbeck No. 1 (1)
64. Wareham & Purbeck No. 2 (1)
65. Wareham & Purbeck No. 3 (1)
66. Wareham & Purbeck No. 4 (1)
67. Weymouth No. 1 (1)
68. Weymouth No. 2 (1)
69. Weymouth No. 3 (1)
70. Weymouth No. 4 (1)
71. Weymouth No. 5 (1)
72. Weymouth No. 6 (1)
73. Weymouth No. 7 (1)
74. Wimborne & Cranborne No. 1 (1)
75. Wimborne & Cranborne No. 2 (1)
76. Wimborne & Cranborne No. 3 (1)
77. Wimborne & Cranborne No. 4 (1)
78. Wimborne & Cranborne No. 5 (1)
79. Wimborne & Cranborne No. 6 (1)
80. Wimborne & Cranborne No. 7 (1)
81. Wimborne Minster (1)

Electoral Divisions from 2 May 1985 to 5 May 2005:

1. Alderney (1); electoral division abolished in 1997
2. Beaminster (1)
3. Blackmore Vale (1)
4. Blandford (1)
5. Boscombe East (1); electoral division abolished in 1997
6. Boscombe West (1); electoral division abolished in 1997
7. Bournemouth Central (1); electoral division abolished in 1997
8. Branksome (1); electoral division abolished in 1997
9. Bridport (1)
10. Broadstone (1); electoral division abolished in 1997
11. Broadwey (1)
12. Burton Grange (1)
13. Canford Cliffs (1); electoral division abolished in 1997
14. Canford Heath (1); electoral division abolished in 1997
15. Canford Magna (1); electoral division abolished in 1997
16. Cerne (1)
17. Chesil (1)
18. Christchurch Central (1)
19. Colehill (1)
20. Commons (1)
21. Corfe Mullen (1)
22. Cranborne Chase (1)
23. Creekmoor (1); electoral division abolished in 1997
24. Dorchester East (1)
25. Dorchester North (1)
26. Dorchester Rural South (1)
27. East Cliff (1); electoral division abolished in 1997
28. Egdon Heath (1)
29. Ensbury Park (1); electoral division abolished in 1997
30. Ferndown (1)
31. Gillingham (1)
32. Hambledon (1)
33. Hampreston South (1)
34. Hamworthy (1); electoral division abolished in 1997
35. Highcliffe (1)
36. Kinson (1); electoral division abolished in 1997
37. Littledown (1); electoral division abolished in 1997
38. Lodmoor (1)
39. Longfleet (1); electoral division abolished in 1997
40. Lower Parkstone (1); electoral division abolished in 1997
41. Lytchett (1)
42. Marshwood Vale (1)
43. Merley (1); electoral division abolished in 1997
44. Minster (1)
45. Moordown (1); electoral division abolished in 1997
46. Mudeford & Wingfield (1)
47. Muscliff (1); electoral division abolished in 1997
48. Newtown (1); electoral division abolished in 1997
49. Oakdale (1); electoral division abolished in 1997
50. Poole Town (1); electoral division abolished in 1997
51. Portland Harbour (1)
52. Portland Tophill (1)
53. Purbeck Hills (1)
54. Queens Park (1); electoral division abolished in 1997
55. Redhill Park (1); electoral division abolished in 1997
56. Rodwell (1)
57. Salterns (1); electoral division abolished in 1997
58. Shaftesbury (1)
59. Sherborne (1)
60. Sherborne Rural (1)
61. Southbourne (1); electoral division abolished in 1997
62. St Leonards & St Ives (1)
63. Strouden Park (1); electoral division abolished in 1997
64. Swanage (1)
65. Talbot Woods (1); electoral division abolished in 1997
66. Upper Parkstone (1); electoral division abolished in 1997
67. Verwood (1)
68. Wallisdown (1); electoral division abolished in 1997
69. Wareham (1)
70. West Cliff (1); electoral division abolished in 1997
71. West Moors (1)
72. West Southbourne (1); electoral division abolished in 1997
73. Westbourne (1); electoral division abolished in 1997
74. Westham (1)
75. Weymouth Town (1)
76. Winterborne (1)
77. Winton (1); electoral division abolished in 1997

Electoral Divisions from 5 May 2005 to 4 May 2017:

1. Beaminster (1)
2. Blackmore Vale (1)
3. Blandford (1)
4. Bride Valley (1)
5. Bridport (1)
6. Broadwey (1)
7. Burton Grange (1)
8. Chickerell & Chesil Bank (1)
9. Christchurch Central (1)
10. Colehill & Stapehill (1)
11. Commons (1)
12. Corfe Mullen (1)
13. Cranborne Chase (1)
14. Dorchester (2)
15. Egdon Heath (1)
16. Ferndown (2)
17. Gillingham (1)
18. Hambledon (1)
19. Highcliffe & Walkford (1)
20. Linden Lea (1)
21. Lodmoor (1)
22. Lytchett (1)
23. Marshwood Vale (1)
24. Minster (1)
25. Mudeford & Highcliffe (1)
26. Portland Harbour (1)
27. Portland Tophill (1)
28. Purbeck Hills (1)
29. Rodwell (1)
30. Shaftesbury (1)
31. Sherborne (1)
32. Sherborne Rural (1)
33. St Leonards & St Ives (1)
34. Stour Vale (1)
35. Swanage (1)
36. Three Valleys (1)
37. Verwood & Three Legged Cross (2)
38. Wareham (1)
39. West Moors & Holt (1)
40. Westham (1)
41. Weymouth Town (1)
42. Winterborne (1)

Electoral Divisions from 4 May 2017 to 2 May 2019 (county abolished):

1. Beaminster (1)
2. Blackmore Vale (1)
3. Blandford Forum (1)
4. Bridport (2)
5. Broadway (1)
6. Burton Grange (1)
7. Chickerell & Chesil Bank (1)
8. Christchurch Central (1)
9. Colehill East & Staphill (1)
10. Colehill West & Wimborne Minster (1)
11. Commons (1)
12. Corfe Mullen (1)
13. Cranborne Chase (1)
14. Dorchester (2)
15. Ferndown (2)
16. Gillingham (2)
17. Hambledon (1)
18. Linden Lea (1)
19. Lodmoor (1)
20. Lytchett Minster & Upton (1)
21. Marshwood Vale (1)
22. Moors (2)
23. Mudeford & Highcliffe (1)
24. North West Purbeck (1)
25. Portland Harbour (1)
26. Portland Tophill (1)
27. Rodwell (1)
28. Shaftesbury (1)
29. Sherborne Rural (1)
30. Sherborne Town (1)
31. South Purbeck (1)
32. Stalbridge & The Beacon (1)
33. Swanage (1)
34. Three Valleys (1)
35. Verwood (2)
36. Walkford (1)
37. Wareham (1)
38. Westham (1)
39. Weymouth Town (1)
40. Winterborne (1)

== Former unitary authority councils ==
=== Bournemouth ===
Wards from 1 April 1974 (first election 7 June 1973) to 3 May 1979:

1. Boscombe East (2)
2. Boscombe West (3)
3. Central (3)
4. East Cliff (3)
5. Kings Park (3)
6. Kinson North (5)
7. Kinson South (5)
8. Moordown North (4)
9. Moordown South (2)
10. Queens Park (5)
11. Redhill Park (4)
12. Southbourne (5)
13. West Cliff (4)
14. West Southbourne (3)
15. Westbourne (4)
16. Winton (2)

Wards from 3 May 1979 to 1 May 2003:

Wards from 1 May 2003 to 2 May 2019 (unitary authority abolished):

1. Boscombe East (3)
2. Boscombe West (3)
3. Central (3)
4. East Cliff & Springbourne (3)
5. East Southbourne & Tuckton (3)
6. Kinson North (3)
7. Kinson South (3)
8. Littledown & Iford (3)
9. Moordown (3)
10. Queen’s Park (3)
11. Redhill & Northbourne (3)
12. Strouden Park (3)
13. Talbot & Branksome Woods (3)
14. Throop & Muscliff (3)
15. Wallisdown & Winton West (3)
16. Westbourne & West Cliff (3)
17. West Southbourne (3)
18. Winton East (3)

=== Poole ===
Wards from 1 April 1974 (first election 7 June 1973) to 5 May 1983:

1. Bourne Valley & Branksome (3)
2. Branksome Park-Canford Cliffs-Sandbanks (3)
3. Broadstone & Canford Magna (5)
4. Hamworthy (3)
5. Newtown (3)
6. Oakdale & South Canford Heath (5)
7. Old Town & Longfleet (3)
8. Parkstone (4)
9. Penn Hill & Lilliput (3)
10. Upper Parkstone & Wallisdown (4)

Wards from 5 May 1983 to 1 May 2003:

All Wards were changed to (3) in 1996

Wards from 1 May 2003 to 7 May 2015:

1. Alderney (3)
2. Branksome East (2)
3. Branksome West (2)
4. Broadstone (3)
5. Canford Cliffs (3)
6. Canford Heath East (2)
7. Canford Heath West (2)
8. Creekmoor (3)
9. Hamworthy East (2)
10. Hamworthy West (2)
11. Merley & Bearwood (3)
12. Newtown (3)
13. Oakdale (3)
14. Parkstone (3)
15. Penn Hill (3)
16. Poole Town (3)

Wards from 7 May 2015 to 2 May 2019 (unitary authority abolished):

1. Alderney (3)
2. Branksome East (2)
3. Branksome West (2)
4. Broadstone (3)
5. Canford Cliffs (3)
6. Canford Heath East (2)
7. Canford Heath West (2)
8. Creekmoor (3)
9. Hamworthy East (2)
10. Hamworthy West (2)
11. Merley & Bearwood (3)
12. Newtown (3)
13. Oakdale (3)
14. Parkstone (3)
15. Penn Hill (3)
16. Poole Town (3)

== Former district councils ==
=== Christchurch ===
Wards from 1 April 1974 (first election 7 June 1973) to 3 May 1979:

1. No. 1 (Jumpers) (4)
2. No. 2 (Central) (3)
3. No. 3 (Somerford) (4)
4. No. 4 (Mudeford) (3)
5. No. 5 (Highcliffe West) (3)
6. No. 6 (Highcliffe East) (3)
7. No. 7 (Hurn & Burton) (2)

Wards from 3 May 1979 to 1 May 2003:

Wards from 1 May 2003 to 2 May 2019 (district abolished):

1. Burton & Winkton (2)
2. Grange (2)
3. Highcliffe (2)
4. Jumpers (2)
5. Mudeford & Friars Cliff (3)
6. North Highcliffe & Walkford (2)
7. Portfield (2)
8. Purewell & Stanpit (2)
9. St Catherine’s & Hurn (2)
10. Town Centre (2)
11. West Highcliffe (3)

=== East Dorset ===
Wards from 1 April 1974 (first election 7 June 1973) to 5 May 1983:

1. No. 1 (Wimborne Minster) (3)
2. No. 2 (St Leonards & St Ives) (3)
3. No. 3 (Corfe Mullen) (3)
4. No. 5 (Hampreston) (7)
5. No. 7 (West Moors) (2)
6. No. 10 (Sixpenny Handley) (1)
7. No. 11 (Witchampton) (1)
8. No. 12 (Holt) (1)
9. No. 13 (Horton) (1)
10. No. 14 (Sturminster Marshall) (1)
11. No. 15 (Pamphill) (1)
12. Colehill (3)
13. Crane (1)
14. Verwood (2)
15. West Parley (2)

Wards from 5 May 1983 to 1 May 2003:

Wards from 1 May 2003 to 7 May 2015:

1. Alderholt (1)
2. Ameysford (1)
3. Colehill East (2)
4. Colehill West (1)
5. Corfe Mullen Central (2)
6. Corfe Mullen North (1)
7. Corfe Mullen South (1)
8. Crane (1)
9. Ferndown Central (2)
10. Ferndown Links (2)
11. Handley Vale (1)
12. Holt (1)
13. Longham (1)
14. Parley (2)
15. St Leonards & St Ives East (2)
16. St Leonards & St Ives West (1)
17. Stapehill (1)
18. Stour (1)
19. Three Cross & Potterne (1)
20. Verwood Stephen’s Castle (2)
21. Verwood Dewlands (2)
22. Verwood Newtown (1)
23. West Moors (3)
24. Wimborne Minster (3)

Wards from 7 May 2015 to 2 May 2019 (district abolished):

1. Alderholt (1)
2. Ameysford (1)
3. Colehill East (2)
4. Colehill West (1)
5. Corfe Mullen (3)
6. Crane (1)
7. Ferndown Central (3)
8. Hampreston & Longham (1)
9. Handley Vale (1)
10. Parley (2)
11. St Leonards (3)
12. Stour (1)
13. Verwood East (2)
14. Verwood West (2)
15. West Moors & Holt (3)
16. Wimborne Minster (2)

=== North Dorset ===
Wards from 1 April 1974 (first election 7 June 1973) to 5 May 1983:

1. No. 1 (Blandford Forum) (3)
2. No. 2 (Shaftesbury) (3)
3. No. 5 (Tarrant Monkton) (1)
4. No. 6 (Tarrant Hinton) (1)
5. No. 7 (Stourpaine) (1)
6. No. 8 (Milborne St Andrew) (1)
7. No. 9 (Winterborne Stickland) (1)
8. No. 10 (Pimperne) (1)
9. No. 12 (Fontmell Magna) (1)
10. No. 13 (Cann) (1)
11. No. 14 (Gillingham) (3)
12. No. 16 (East & West Stour) (1)
13. No. 17 (Motcombe) (1)
14. No. 18 (Child Okeford) (1)
15. No. 19 (Marnhull) (1)
16. Blackmore (2)
17. Bourton & District (1)
18. Bulbarrow (1)
19. Lower Winterborne (1)
20. Lydden Vale (1)
21. Portman (1)
22. Riversdale (1)
23. Stour Valley (2)

Wards from 5 May 1983 to 1 May 2003:

Wards from 1 May 2003 to 7 May 2015:

1. Abbey (2)
2. Blackmore (2)
3. Blandford Damory Down (1)
4. Blandford Hilltop (1)
5. Blandford Langton St Leonards (1)
6. Blandford Old Town (1)
7. Blandford Station (1)
8. Bourton & District (1)
9. Bulbarrow (1)
10. Cranborne Chase (1)
11. Gillingham Town (1)
12. Hill Forts (2)
13. Lodbourne (1)
14. Lydden Vale (1)
15. Marnhull (1)
16. Milton (1)
17. Motcombe & Ham (1)
18. Portman (1)
19. Riversdale (1)
20. Shaftesbury Central (1)
21. Shaftesbury Christy's (1)
22. Shaftesbury Grosvenor (1)
23. Shaftesbury Underhill (1)
24. Stour Valley (2)
25. The Beacon (1)
26. The Lower Tarrants (1)
27. The Stours (1)
28. Wyke (2)

Wards from 7 May 2015 to 2 May 2019 (district abolished):

1. Abbey (2)
2. Blackmore (2)
3. Blandford Central (2)
4. Blandford Hilltop (1)
5. Blandford Langton St Leonards (1)
6. Blandford Old Town (1)
7. Bulbarrow (1)
8. Gillingham Rural (2)
9. Gillingham Town (3)
10. Hill Forts (3)
11. Lower Tarrants (1)
12. Lydden Vale (1)
13. Motcombe & Bourton (2)
14. Riversdale & Portman (2)
15. Shaftesbury East (2)
16. Shaftesbury West (2)
17. Sturminster Newton (2)
18. The Beacon (1)
19. The Stours & Marnhull (2)

=== Purbeck ===
Wards from 1 April 1974 (first election 7 June 1973) to 3 May 1979:

1. Bere Regis (1)
2. Castle (2)
3. Langton (1)
4. Lytchett Matravers (1)
5. Lytchett Minster (3)
6. St Martin (1)
7. Swanage (5)
8. Wareham (3)
9. West Purbeck (1)
10. Winfrith (1)
11. Wool (2)

Wards from 3 May 1979 to 6 May 1999:

Wards from 6 May 1999 to 7 May 2015:

1. Bere Regis (1)
2. Castle (1)
3. Creech Barrow (1)
4. Langton (1)
5. Lytchett Matravers (2)
6. Lytchett Minster & Upton East (2)
7. Lytchett Minster & Upton West (2)
8. St Martin (2)
9. Swanage North (2)
10. Swanage South (3)
11. Wareham (3)
12. West Purbeck (1)
13. Winfrith (1)
14. Wool (2)

Wards from 7 May 2015 to 2 May 2019 (district abolished):

1. Bere Regis (1) †
2. Castle (1) †
3. Creech Barrow (1) †
4. Langton (1) †
5. Lulworth & Winfrith (1)
6. Lytchett Matravers (2)
7. Lytchett Minster & Upton East (2)
8. Lytchett Minster & Upton West (2)
9. St Martin (2)
10. Swanage North (3)
11. Swanage South (3)
12. Wareham (3) †
13. Wool (3) †

† minor boundary changes in 2015

=== West Dorset ===
Wards from 1 April 1974 (first election 7 June 1973) to 5 May 1983:

1. Beaminster (2)
2. Bothenhampton (1)
3. Bradford Abbas (1)
4. Bradpole (1)
5. Bridport (5)
6. Broadmayne (1)
7. Broadwindsor (1)
8. Burton Bradstock (1)
9. Caundle Vale (1)
10. Cerne Valley (1)
11. Charminister (1)
12. Charmouth (1)
13. Chesil Bank (1)
14. Chickerell (2)
15. Dorchester Central (1)
16. Dorchester East (4)
17. Dorchester West (5)
18. Frome Valley (1)
19. Halstock (1)
20. Holnest (1)
21. Loders (1)
22. Lyme Regis (3)
23. Maiden Newton (1)
24. Netherbury (1)
25. Owermoigne (1)
26. Piddle Valley (1)
27. Puddletown (1)
28. Queen Thorne (1)
29. Sherborne (5)
30. Stinsford (1)
31. Symondsbury (1)
32. Thorncombe (1)
33. Tolpuddle (1)
34. Whitchurch Canonicorum (1)
35. Winterborne St Martin (1)
36. Yetminster (1)

Wards from 5 May 1983 to 1 May 2003:

1. Beaminster (2)
2. Bothenhampton (1)
3. Bradford Abbas (1)
4. Bradpole (1)
5. Bridport North (3)
6. Bridport South (2)
7. Broadmayne (1)
8. Broadwindsor (1)
9. Burton Bradstock (1)
10. Caundle Vale (1)
11. Cerne Valley (1)
12. Charminister (1)
13. Charmouth (1)
14. Chesil Bank (1)
15. Chickerell (2)
16. Dorchester East (2)
17. Dorchester North (2)
18. Dorchester South (3)
19. Dorchester West (3)
20. Frome Valley (1)
21. Halstock (1)
22. Holnest (1)
23. Loders (1)
24. Lyme Regis (3)
25. Maiden Newton (1)
26. Netherbury (1)
27. Owermoigne (2)
28. Piddle Valley (1)
29. Puddletown (1)
30. Queen Thorne (1)
31. Sherborne East (2)
32. Sherborne West (3)
33. Symondsbury (1)
34. Thorncombe (1)
35. Tolpuddle (1)
36. Whitchurch Canonicorum (1)
37. Winterborne St Martin (1)
38. Yetminster (1)

Wards from 1 May 2003 to 7 May 2015:

1. Beaminster (2)
2. Bradford Abbas (1)
3. Bradpole (1)
4. Bridport North (2)
5. Bridport South & Bothenhampton (3)
6. Broadmayne (1)
7. Broadwindsor (1)
8. Burton Bradstock (1)
9. Cam Vale (1)
10. Charminster & Cerne Valley (2)
11. Charmouth (1)
12. Chesil Bank (1)
13. Chickerell (3)
14. Chideock & Symondsbury (1)
15. Dorchester East (2)
16. Dorchester North (2)
17. Dorchester South (2)
18. Dorchester West (2)
19. Frome Valley (1)
20. Halstock (1)
21. Loders (1)
22. Lyme Regis (2)
23. Maiden Newton (1)
24. Marshwood Vale (1)
25. Netherbury (1)
26. Owermoigne (2)
27. Piddle Valley (1)
28. Puddletown (1)
29. Queen Thorne (1)
30. Sherborne East (2)
31. Sherborne West (2)
32. Winterborne St Martin (1)
33. Yetminster (1)

Wards from 7 May 2015 to 2 May 2019 (district abolished):

1. Beaminster (2)
2. Bridport North (3)
3. Bridport South (3)
4. Broadmayne & Crossways (2)
5. Broadwindsor (1)
6. Burton Bradstock (1)
7. Cerne Valley (2)
8. Chickerell & Chesil Bank (3)
9. Chideock & Symondsbury (1)
10. Dorchester East (2)
11. Dorchester North (3)
12. Dorchester South (2)
13. Dorchester West (2)
14. Frome Valley (1)
15. Lyme Regis & Charmouth (2)
16. Maiden Newton (1)
17. Netherbury (1)
18. Piddle Valley (1)
19. Puddletown (1)
20. Queen Thorne (1)
21. Sherborne East (2)
22. Sherborne West (2)
23. Winterborne St Martin (1)
24. Yetminster & Cam Vale (2)

=== Weymouth and Portland ===
Wards from 1 April 1974 (first election 7 June 1973) to 3 May 1979:

1. Melcombe Regis (3)
2. North (3)
3. Portland (9)
4. Preston (3)
5. Radipole (3)
6. Westham East (3)
7. Westham North (3)
8. Westham West (3)
9. Weymouth East (3)
10. Weymouth West (3)
11. Wyke Regis (3)

Wards from 3 May 1979 to 10 June 2004:

Wards from 10 June 2004 to 2 May 2019 (district abolished):

1. Littlemoor (2)
2. Melcombe Regis (3)
3. Preston (3)
4. Radipole (2)
5. Tophill East (2)
6. Tophill West (3)
7. Underhill (2)
8. Upwey & Broadwey (2)
9. Westham East (2)
10. Westham North (3)
11. Westham West (2)
12. Wey Valley (2)
13. Weymouth East (2)
14. Weymouth West (3)
15. Wyke Regis (3)

== Electoral wards by constituency ==
Wards as they existed on 1 December 2020.

=== Bournemouth East ===
Bournemouth, Christchurch and Poole: Boscombe East & Pokesdown; Boscombe West; East Cliff & Springbourne; East Southbourne & Tuckton; Littledown & Ilford; Moordown; Muscliff & Strouden Park; Queen’s Park; West Southbourne.

=== Bournemouth West ===
Bournemouth, Christchurch and Poole: Alderney & Bourne Valley; Bournemouth Central; Kinson; Redhill & Northbourne; Talbot & Branksome Woods; Wallisdown & Winton West; Westbourne & West Cliff; Winton East.

=== Christchurch ===
Bournemouth, Christchurch and Poole: Burton & Grange; Christchurch Town; Commons; Highcliffe & Walkford; Mudeford, Stanpit & West Highcliffe.

Dorset: Ferndown North; Ferndown South; St. Leonards & St. Ives; West Moors & Three Legged Cross; West Parley.

=== Mid Dorset and North Poole ===
Bournemouth, Christchurch and Poole: Bearwood & Merley; Broadstone; Canford Heath.

Dorset: Colehill & Wimborne Minster East; Corfe Mullen; Lytchett Matravers & Upton; Stour & Allen Vale; Wareham; West Purbeck (polling districts WPU2 & WPU3); Wimborne Minster.

=== North Dorset ===
Dorset: Beacon; Blackmore Vale; Blandford; Cranborne & Alderholt; Cranborne Chase; Gillingham; Hill Forts & Upper Tarrants; Puddletown & Lower Winterborne; Shaftesbury Town; Stalbridge & Marnhull; Sturminster Newton; Verwood; Winterborne North.

=== Poole ===
Bournemouth, Christchurch and Poole: Canford Cliffs; Creekmoor; Hamworthy; Newtown & Heatherlands; Oakdale; Parkstone; Penn Hill; Poole Town.

=== South Dorset ===
Dorset: Chickerell; Crossways; Littlemoor & Preston; Melcombe Regis; Portland; Radipole; Rodwell & Wyke; South East Purbeck; Swanage; Upwey & Broadwey; West Purbeck (polling districts WPU1, WPU4, WPU5, WPU6, WPU7, WPU8, WPU9, WPU10, WPU11, WPU12 & WPU13); Westham.

=== West Dorset ===
Dorset: Beaminster; Bridport; Chalk Valleys; Charminster St. Mary’s; Chesil Bank; Dorchester East; Dorchester Poundbury; Dorchester West; Eggardon; Lyme & Charmouth; Marshwood Vale; Sherborne East; Sherborne Rural; Sherborne West; Winterborne & Broadmayne; Yetminster.

== See also ==
- List of parliamentary constituencies in Dorset
