= Dorchester East (ward) =

Electoral ward in Dorset, England

- ward Dorset Council
- Population: 8,371
- Major settlements: Dorchester, Dorset

Current ward
- Created: 2019
- Councillor: Rory Major (Liberal Democrats)
- Councillor: Stella Jones (Liberal Democrats)
- Number of councillors: 2

Dorchester East is an electoral ward in Dorset. Since 2019, the ward has elected 2 councillors to Dorset Council.

== Geography ==
The Dorchester East ward covers the eastern areas of Dorchester.

== Councillors ==
Election	Councillors	
2019	Molly Rennie (Liberal Democrats)	Stella Jones (Liberal Democrats)
2024	Rory Major (Liberal Democrats)	Stella Jones (Liberal Democrats)

== Election ==
=== 2019 Dorset Council election ===
2019 Dorset Council election: Dorchester East (2 seats)
Party	Candidate	Votes	%	±%
Liberal Democrats	Molly Rennie	1,755	64.2	
Liberal Democrats	Stella Jones	1,739	63.6	
Conservative	Anthony James Kirkpatrick Austin	559	20.5	
Conservative	Andrew William Charles Christopher	487	17.8	
Labour	Claudia Sorin	448	16.4	
Labour	Barry Thompson	369	13.5	
Majority				
Turnout		2,733	41.70	
Liberal Democrats win (new seat)				
Liberal Democrats win (new seat)				

=== 2024 Dorset Council election ===
2019 Dorset Council election: Dorchester East (2 seats)
Party	Candidate	Votes	%	±%
Liberal Democrats	Stella Jones*	1,337	52.4	−11.2
Liberal Democrats	Rory Major	979	38.3	−25.9
Green	Kate Hebditch	825	32.3	New
Independents for Dorset	Katy Jones	571	22.4	New
Conservative	Angus Christopher	329	12.9	−4.9
Conservative	Mina Bowater	322	12.6	−7.9
Labour	Barry Thompson	304	11.9	−1.6
Labour	Ash Mottaghi	208	8.1	−8.3
Turnout		2,553	38.54	
Liberal Democrats hold		Swing		
Liberal Democrats hold		Swing		

== See also ==
- List of electoral wards in Dorset
