= Marshwood Vale (ward) =

Electoral ward in Dorset, England

- ward Dorset Council
- Population: 4,529
- Major settlements: Morcombelake, Stoke Abbott and Thorncombe

Current ward
- Created: 2019
- Councillor: Simon Christopher (Conservative)
- Number of councillors: 1

Marshwood Vale is an electoral ward in Dorset, England. Since the 2019 Dorset Council election, it has elected one councillor to Dorset Council.

== Geography ==
The Marshwood Vale ward is covers the rural Marshwood Vale area of west Dorset. Settlements include Morcombelake, Stoke Abbott and Thorncombe.

== Councillors ==
Election	Councillors
2019	Simon Christopher (Conservative)
2024	Simon Christopher (Conservative)

== Elections ==
=== 2019 Dorset Council election ===
2019 Dorset Council election: Marshwood Vale (1 seat)
Party	Candidate	Votes	%	±%
Conservative	Simon John Christopher	752	39.0	
Independent	Jacqui Sewell	595	30.9	
Green	Simon Fairlie	308	16.0	
Liberal Democrats	Eddie Gerrard	187	9.7	
Labour	Phyllida Culpin	85	4.4	
Majority				
Turnout			50.30	
Conservative win (new seat)				

=== 2024 Dorset Council election ===
2024 Dorset Council election: Marshwood Vale (1 seat)
Party	Candidate	Votes	%	±%
Conservative	Simon John Christopher	645	39.8	+0.8
Green	Jacqui Sewell	525	32.4	+1.5
Liberal Democrats	Jane Gregory	340	21.0	+11.3
Labour	Steve Chapman	109	6.7	+2.3
Turnout		1,619	41.37	
Conservative hold		Swing		

== See also ==
- List of electoral wards in Dorset
