= Westham (ward) =

Electoral ward in Dorset, England

- ward Dorset Council
- Population: 9,393
- Major settlements: Westham

Current ward
- Created: 2019
- Councillor: Ryan Hope (Liberal Democrats)
- Councillor: Alex Fuhrmann (Liberal Democrats)
- Number of councillors: 2

Westham is an electoral ward in Dorset. Since 2019, the ward has elected 2 councillors to Dorset Council.

== Geography ==
The Westham ward covers the Weymouth suburb of Westham.

== Councillors ==
Election	Councillors	
2019	Ryan Hope (Liberal Democrats)	Gill Taylor (Liberal Democrats)
2024	Ryan Hope (Liberal Democrats)	Alex Fuhrmann (Liberal Democrats)

== Election ==
=== 2019 Dorset Council election ===
2019 Dorset Council election: Westham (2 seats)
Party	Candidate	Votes	%	±%
Liberal Democrats	Ryan Dean Hope	895	46.1	
Liberal Democrats	Gill Taylor	836	43.0	
Labour	Sara Louise Greenhalf	471	24.2	
Labour	David Joseph Greenhalf	441	22.7	
Conservative	Clare Louise Williams	366	18.8	
Conservative	Tom Tannassee	345	17.8	
Majority				
Turnout		1,943	29.61	
Liberal Democrats win (new seat)				
Liberal Democrats win (new seat)				

=== 2024 Dorset Council election ===
Westham
Party	Candidate	Votes	%	±%
Liberal Democrats	Ryan Dean Hope*	708	43.8	−2.3
Liberal Democrats	Alex Fuhrmann	684	42.3	−0.7
Labour	Lucy Hamilton	438	27.1	+2.9
Labour	Jon Rodd	320	19.8	−2.9
Independents for Dorset	Christine Mary James	272	16.8	New
Conservative	Alexander John McGlynn	255	15.8	−3.0
Conservative	Thomas Oswald Tannassee	175	10.8	−7.0
Turnout		1,618	24.04	−5.57
Liberal Democrats hold		Swing	▼2.3	
Liberal Democrats hold		Swing	▲0.9	

== See also ==
- List of electoral wards in Dorset
