= Holy Trinity Church, Bincombe =

Church in Dorset, England

Holy Trinity Church
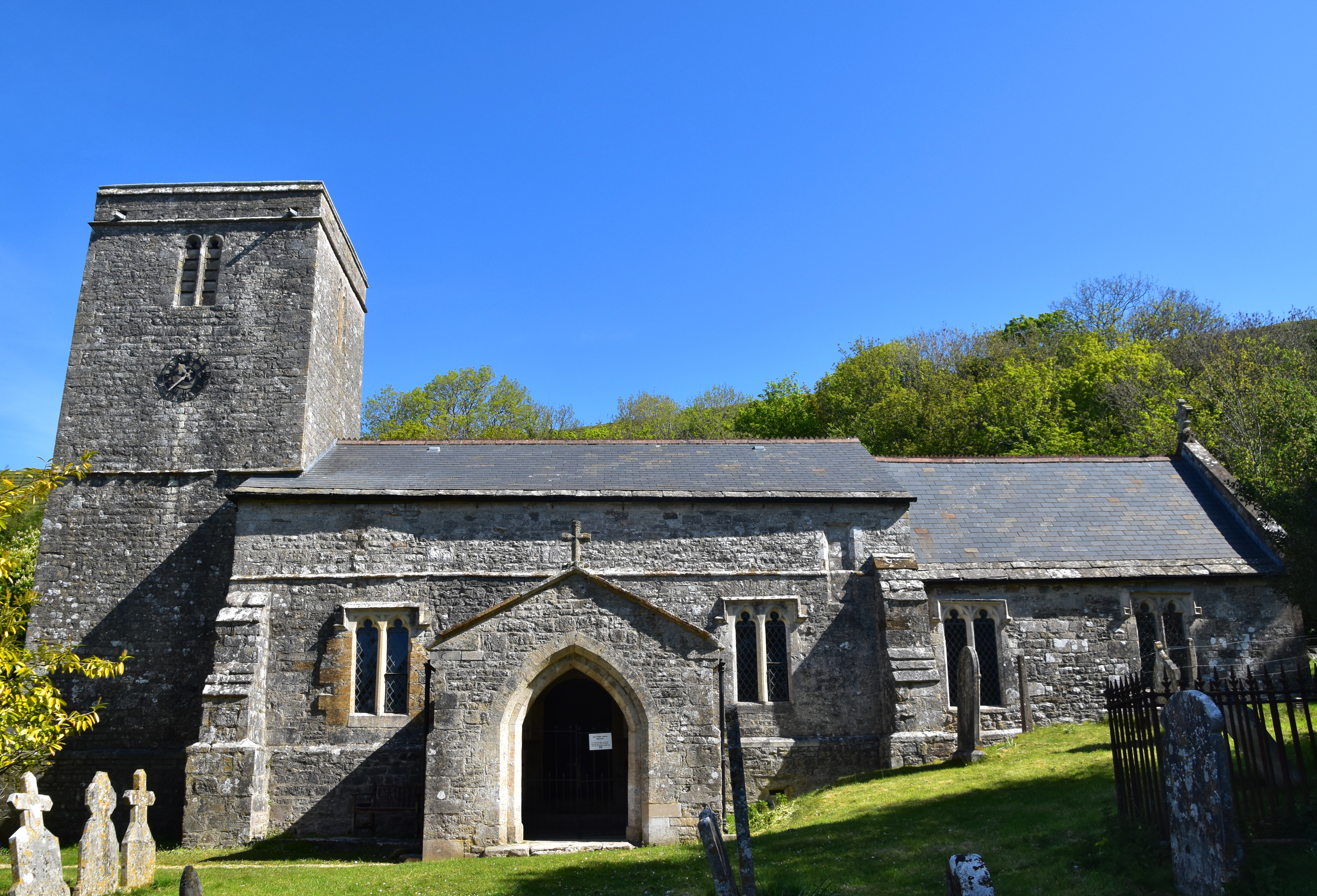

Religion
- Affiliation: Church of England
- Ecclesiastical or organizational status: Active

Location
- Location: Bincombe, Dorset, England
- Interactive map of Holy Trinity Church
- Coordinates: 50.6598°N 2.4449°W

Architecture
- Type: Church

Holy Trinity Church is a Church of England parish church located in Bincombe, Dorset, England. The church dates back to the late 12th century, with subsequent additions and a restoration in 1865. It is a Grade I listed building.

== History ==
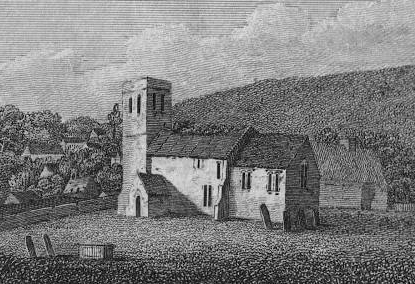
An illustration of Holy Trinity Church, published in the Gentleman's Magazine in 1802.

Much of the current church structure dates to the 15th century, although parts of the nave and chancel originate from the late 12th century. The south wall of the chancel, the north wall of the nave, and the tower were all reconstructed during the 15th century. Additionally, the south wall of the nave was heightened during this period. A south porch was added in the 17th century, constructed from fragments of old stonework.

The church underwent extensive restoration and reseating in 1865. The restoration was funded by voluntary subscriptions and Gonville and Caius College, which has been the parish's principal landowner since 1570. The work was conducted by Mr. R. Reynolds of Weymouth, with Mr. S. Pitman as clerk of the works. The masonry work was undertaken by Mr. George Roper from Bincombe. While the church was closed for restoration, a nearby barn served as a temporary place of worship.

The interior was restored, the eastern wall of the chancel was rebuilt, and the external walls were strengthened and underpinned. The church's pews were removed and replaced with new seating of stained deal. Some new fittings were also added, including a communion table, pulpit, reading desk and harmonium. The church was reopened by the Bishop of Salisbury, the Right Rev. Walter Kerr Hamilton, on 31 July 1865. The reopening was brought forward to coincide with the Bishop's visit to Dorchester for an archaeological meeting.

The church's organ was installed in 1901 after being transferred from St Nicholas' Church in Broadwey. A clock was installed on the tower as a thanksgiving at the end of World War II. In 1995, the church's roof was renewed and other repairs carried out at a cost of £82,000.

== Architecture ==
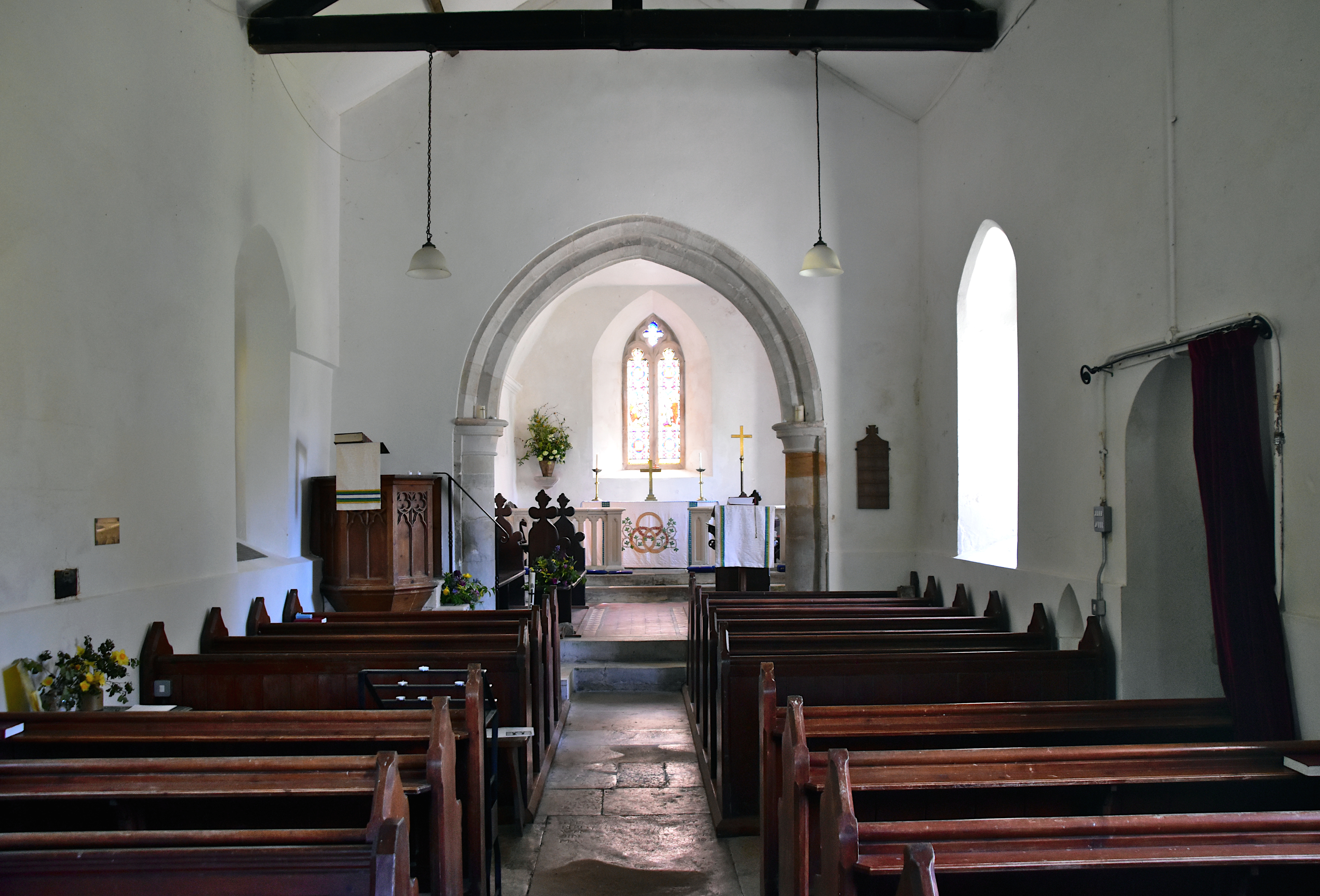
The interior of Holy Trinity Church.

Holy Trinity is constructed from rubblestone with freestone dressings, and features slate and stone tile roofing. The two-stage tower includes a parapet and houses two bells: one by John Wallis of Salisbury, dated 1594, and another by Thomas Purdue, dated 1658. Internal fittings include a font of 13th-century origin, the bowl of which is made from Purbeck stone. The window in the east wall of the chancel features stained glass installed in 1865 in memory of Elizabeth, the wife of surgeon John Howship.
