= St Nicholas' Church, Broadwey =

Church in Dorset, England

St Nicholas' Church
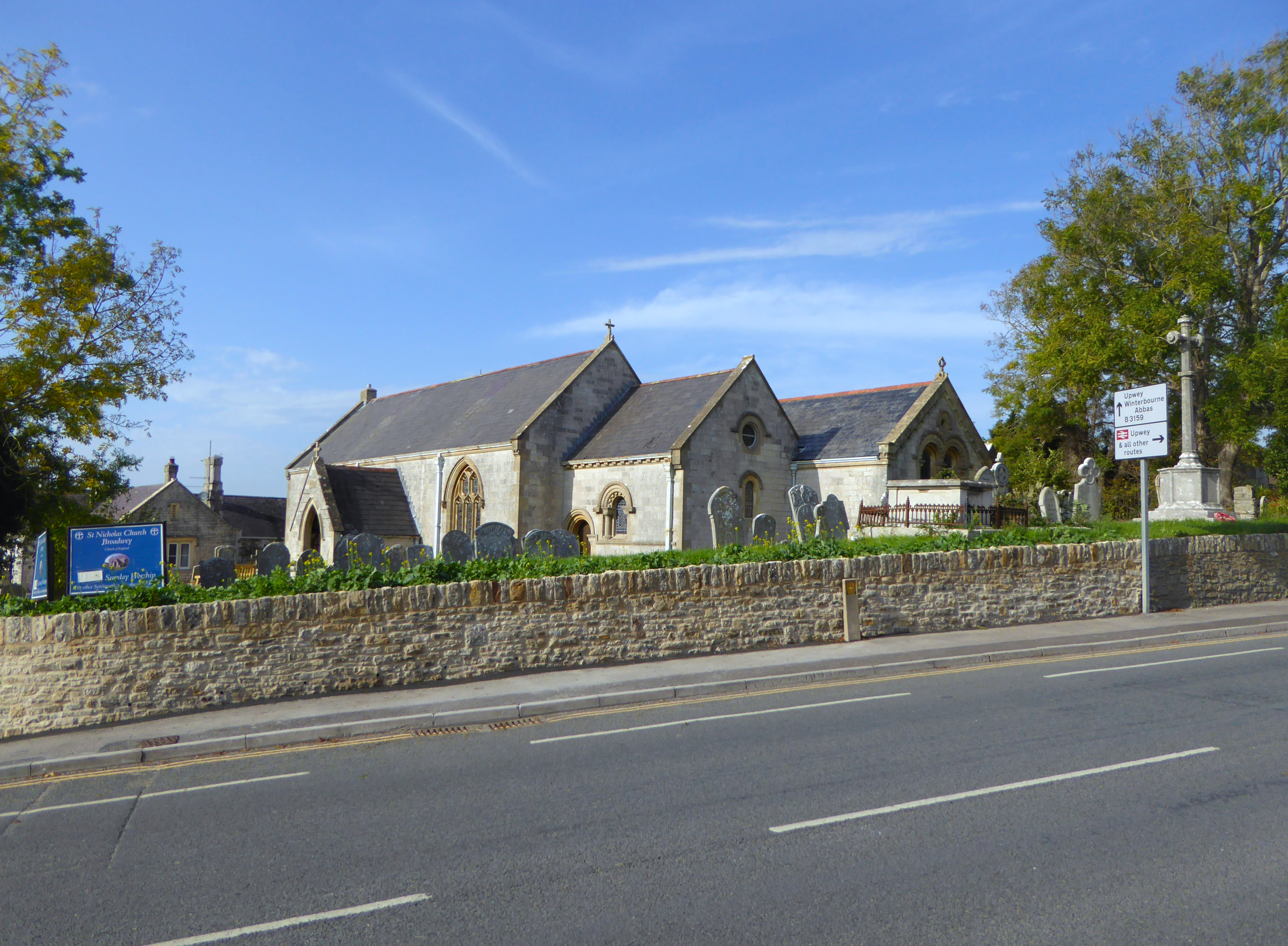

Religion
- Affiliation: Church of England
- Ecclesiastical or organizational status: Active

Location
- Location: Broadwey, Dorset, England
- Interactive map of St Nicholas' Church
- Coordinates: 50.6505°N 2.4712°W

Architecture
- Type: Church

St Nicholas' Church is a Church of England church in Broadwey, Dorset, England. It has Norman origins, but most of the existing church dates from 19th century work. St Nicholas' was the parish church of Broadwey until 1933 when the village became a suburb of Weymouth.

The church became Grade II listed in 1953. A number of 19th century chest tombs and headstones in the churchyard are also Grade II listed, including those of the Firth, Melchior, Beale, Bartlett and Nicholson families. A World War I memorial is also located in the churchyard.

== History ==
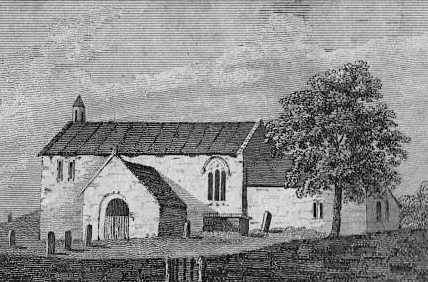
An illustration of St Nicholas' Church, published in the Gentleman's Magazine in 1802.

St Nicholas' Church contains fragments dating to the 12th, 14th and 15th centuries, but most of the building dates to the 19th century when various rebuilding and alteration schemes were carried out. The north aisle dates to 1815 and the nave to 1834. Work was carried out in 1873–74 on the enlargement and partial re-seating of the church, to the designs of G. R. Crickmay of Weymouth, which included the addition of a chancel and vestry.

The church underwent further alteration and enlargement in 1901, with Messrs Crickmay & Sons as the architects and Mr. Theophilus Conway of Weymouth as the builder. Although enlargement of the church had been considered necessary beforehand, fundraising did not begin until 1900 after £1,000 was bequeathed by Colonel R. O. F. Steward of Nottington. Broadwey's rector, Rev. D. Long, held a meeting in December 1900, which resulted in the formation of a building committee, which raised a further £600 of the £1,900 cost after a week of fundraising.

As part of the restoration work, the south wall of the nave was removed to make way for a new aisle, which also incorporated an organ chamber adjoining a chancel at its east end. The work allowed the church to accommodate approximately 400 persons. The new organ cost £270 and was built by Messrs. Peter Conacher and Co of Huddersfield. The Dean of Salisbury, Allan Webb, dedicated the new aisle and organ on 22 January 1902. The church's previous organ was transferred to Holy Trinity Church at Bincombe.

Further alteration work has been carried out in the late 20th century, including the addition of a Sunday school room in 1985. In 2001, the pews were removed and the church redecorated and reordered.

== Architecture ==
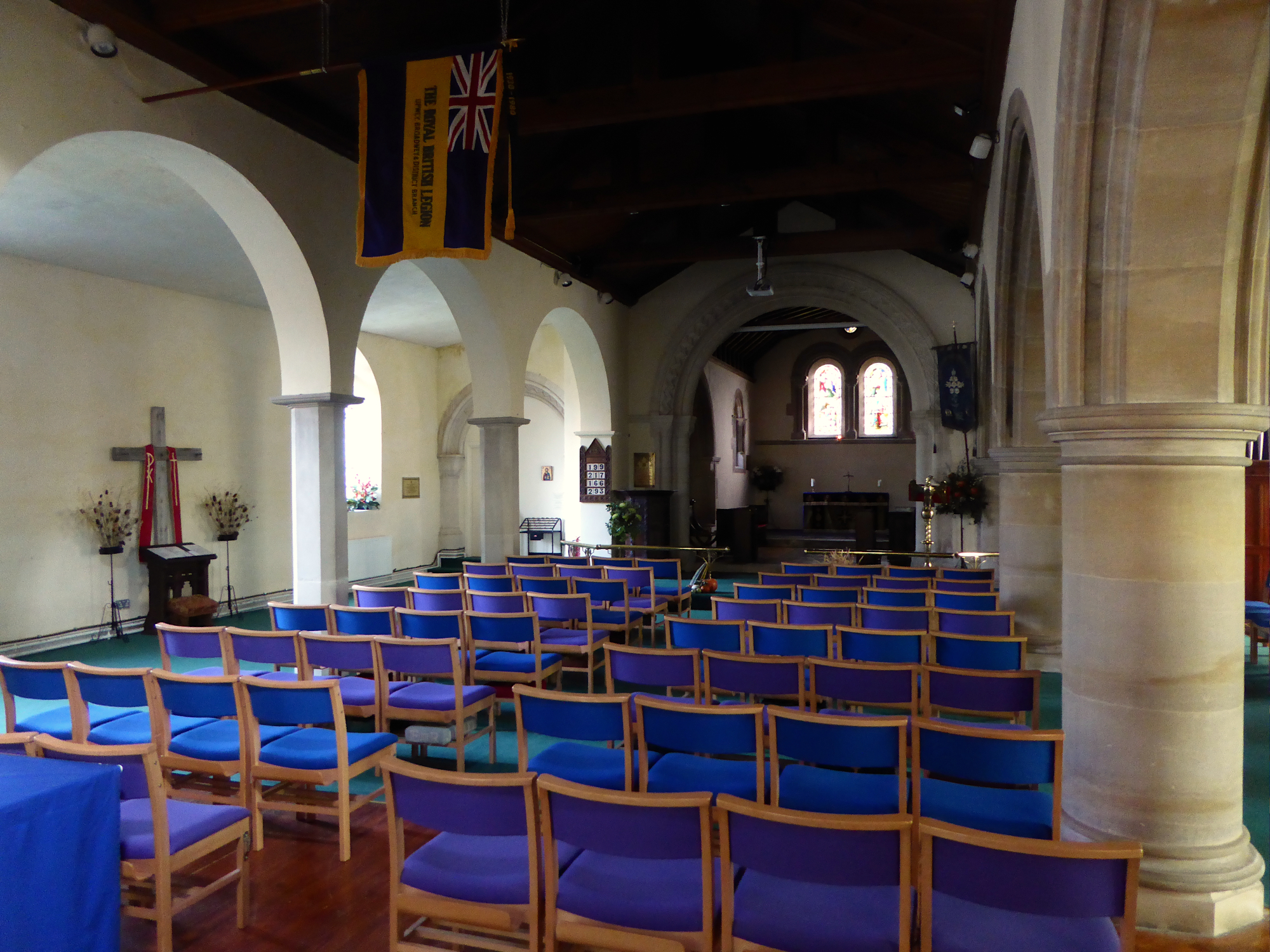
The interior of St Nicholas' Church.

St Nicholas' is built of Portland stone ashlar, with a slate roof, except for the north aisle, which uses coursed rubble in its walls and lead on the roof. The church has a double bell turret and plain whitewashed walls inside. The south aisle incorporates a 12th-century doorway on the south side. The font of Purbeck stone dates to the 12th century, the five-sided pulpit to the 17th century and the pews to the 19th century. Historic England, in their listed building entry for the church, describes its style as "rather heavy neo-Norman".
