= Alliance for Local Living =

British political party

Alliance for Local Living Alliance for Local Living Group
- Abbreviation: ALL
- Party Leader: Felicity Rice
- Group Leader in Dorset Council: Les Fry
- Deputy Group Leader in Dorset Council: Rob Hughes
- Founders: Michael Hancock; Felicity Rice
- Founded: 24 November 2018; 7 years ago
- Registered: 1 April 2019
- Dissolved: 2024; 2 years ago
- Merger of: Independents for Dorset; Three Towns Together
- Merged into: Poole People (Bournemouth, Christchurch and Poole)
- Succeeded by: Independents for Dorset (Dorset)
- Branches: ALL for Bournemouth, Christchurch and Poole; ALL for Dorset
- Ideology: Localism Nonpartisanism
- Colours: Turquoise; Pink
- Slogan: Standing for Better, for All Together

Website
- www.voteforall.org.uk

The Alliance for Local Living (ALL) was a minor localist party and political group based in Dorset, with separate branches in the two authorities, ALL for Bournemouth, Christchurch and Poole and ALL for Dorset. The BCP office was based in Poole, whilst the Dorset office was based in Weymouth. The party was deregistered in November 2023, at which point it had four councillors on Dorset Council, who continued to sit together as an informal grouping. The group became Independents for Dorset in 2024.

== History ==
=== Background ===
Prior to 2019, Dorset was divided into three authorities, with Bournemouth and Poole each constituting unitary authorities, with the remainder of the county as a two-tier system, under Dorset County Council. However, in 2017 the government supported plans to reorganise Dorset into two unitary authorities, with the existing unitary authorities of Bournemouth and Poole to merge with the district of Christchurch, and the remaining districts to form a new Dorset Council. Legislation for this was passed in 2018 by Parliament. Two separate groups, Independents for Dorset and Three Towns Together subsequently formed in the two unitary authorities, with the intention of supporting localist independent candidates. In November 2018, the two groups joined to form the Alliance for Local Living, with the former group ultimately changing its name to ALL for Dorset within ALL.

=== Bournemouth, Christchurch and Poole ===
In October 2018 founders Felicity Rice and Michael Hancock launched the group as the Alliance for Local Living in preparation of the 2019 Bournemouth Christchurch and Poole Council election; whilst organising under the banner of ALL, it was planned for candidates to stand as independents, and be free of political whips if elected. Early liaisons were made with the Poole People Party, a similarly localist group founded in 2010 which had councillors as part of Poole district council.

On 1 April 2019, ALL was registered with the electoral commission, with fourteen names and three emblems filed for ballot papers. Four candidates were due to stand for ALL in Bournemouth, Christchurch and Poole, but due to the timing of the election and the registration of the party just a month before, two candidates (Michael Hancock for the Parkstone Ward and Martin Smalley for the Alderney & Bourne Valley Ward) stood as independents, with the remaining two (Felicity Rice for the Oakdale Ward and Claire Crescent for the Alderney & Bourne Valley Ward) standing as "Alliance for Local Living Independent Candidate".

In the 2019 inaugural election for Bournemouth, Christchurch and Poole only party leader Felicity Rice won a seat in Oakdale ward. Within the BCP Council, ALL Councillor Felicity Rice joined with the then seven Poole People Candidates to form the Poole People and ALL Political Group; this group of eight was joint third-largest, alongside the Christchurch Independents. Subsequently, on 21 May, a Unity Alliance administration took control of Bournemouth, Christchurch and Poole Council, with a coalition led by the Liberal Democrats comprising the Christchurch Independents group, Poole People, Labour, the Greens, ALL and independents.

However, in 2020, two Poole People councillors left both the party and one left the administration, alongside one Christchurch Independent dying and another leaving the group. As such the Unity Alliance was left without a majority, leading to a vote of no confidence which resulted in a tie due to one abstention. However, subsequently a Liberal Democrat councillor died, and the remaining former-Poole People councillor also left the alliance, leaving it with a minority; a second vote of no confidence was held in September, which passed and thus removed Vikki Slade as leader. A meeting of the council was scheduled for 1 October in order to elect a new leader of the council; Conservative leader on the council Drew Mellor was nominated by his deputy Phillip Broadhead, stating that the council "needed a reset", whilst Christchurch Independent Lesley Dedman nominated Vikki Slade. with Conservative Group Leader Drew Mellor subsequently elected leader of the council, forming a new minority administration. In a secret ballot, Mellor received 40 votes for leader, whilst Slade received 33 votes, with a single abstention, with Mellor duly elected leader of the council. As such, the Alliance for Local Living currently is opposition in BCP Council.

In October 2022, leader Felicity Rice was charged with wilful obstruction of a highway in London while protesting alongside Just Stop Oil. She was re-elected in the 2023 Bournemouth, Christchurch and Poole Council election as part of the Poole People Party.

=== Dorset Council ===
In January 2019 a meeting was held in Dorchester to launch the group, which included as a speaker Peter MacFayden, who helped launch Independents for Frome, a similar localist group in Somerset, alongside representatives from the Bournemouth, Christchurch and Poole ALL and other localist groups. Whilst no candidates stood in Dorset council as ALL Candidates, ALL for Dorset encouraged residents to stand as independent candidates under the joint banner. Sixteen candidates stood for either or both Dorset Council and local Parish elections. Four independents were ultimately elected to Dorset Council in the 2019 Dorset Council election, subsequently sitting as the Alliance for Local Living Group. Aside from the ALL Councillors, the Conservatives won 43 of the 42 seats required for a majority, with the Liberal Democrats winning 29, the Greens 4, and Labour 2; as such, alongside the Green Party, the Alliance for Local Living Group is the joint third biggest group on the council.

In 2024, the group was succeeded by the Independents for Dorset.

== Former Councillors ==
At the time of its deregistration in November 2023, the party had four councillors on Dorset Council.

Name	Ward	Notes
Bournemouth, Christchurch and Poole Council
Felicity Rice	Alderney & Bourne Valley	Left party for Poole People, who she stood for in 2023
Dorset Council
Susan Cocking	Portland	Contested in 2024 as IfD candidate but did not retain seat
Les Fry	Dorchester West	Held seat for IfD in 2024
Rob Hughes	Portland	Held seat for IfD in 2024
John Worth	Chickerell	Did not contest 2024

== See also ==
- Bournemouth, Christchurch and Poole
  - Bournemouth, Christchurch and Poole Council
  - 2019 Bournemouth, Christchurch and Poole Council
- Dorset Council
  - 2019 Dorset Council Election
- Localism
- Poole People
- Independents for Frome
- Independents for Dorset
