= Dorchester West (ward) =

Electoral ward in Dorset, England

- ward Dorset Council
- Population: 9,142
- Major settlements: Dorchester, Dorset

Current ward
- Created: 2019
- Councillor: Andy Canning (Liberal Democrats)
- Councillor: Les Fry (Independents for Dorset)
- Number of councillors: 2

Dorchester West is an electoral ward in Dorset. Since 2019, the ward has elected 2 councillors to Dorset Council.

== Geography ==
The Dorchester West ward covers the western areas of Dorchester.

== Councillors ==
Election	Councillors	
2019	Andy Canning (Liberal Democrats)	Les Fry (Alliance for Local Living)
2024	Andy Canning (Liberal Democrats)	Les Fry (Independents for Dorset)

== Election ==
=== 2019 Dorset Council election ===
2019 Dorset Council election: Dorchester West (2 seats)
Party	Candidate	Votes	%	±%
Liberal Democrats	Andy Canning	1,221	44.7	
Independent	Les Fry	1,064	38.9	
Liberal Democrats	Janet Elizabeth Hewitt	973	35.6	
Conservative	Gerald Duke	512	18.7	
Green	Len Herbert	434	15.9	
Conservative	Ian Francois Bernard Gosling	336	12.3	
Labour	Jules Daulby	289	10.6	
Labour	Tracee Lorraine Cossey	264	9.7	
Majority				
Turnout		2,733	39.51	
Liberal Democrats win (new seat)				
Independent win (new seat)				

=== 2024 Dorset Council election ===
Dorchester West
Party	Candidate	Votes	%	±%
Independents for Dorset	Les Fry*	1,335	58.5	+19.6
Liberal Democrats	Andy Canning*	1,322	57.9	+13.2
Labour	Claudia Sorin	580	25.4	+14.8
Conservative	Jeremy Peel-Yates	261	11.4	−7.3
Labour	Andrew Charles Wyatt	259	11.3	+1.6
Conservative	Kevin Selby	254	11.1	−1.2
Turnout		2,282	34.06	
Independents for Dorset hold		Swing		
Liberal Democrats hold		Swing		

== See also ==
- List of electoral wards in Dorset
