= Portland (ward) =

Electoral ward in Dorset, England

- ward Dorset Council
- Population: 13,417
- Major settlements: Isle of Portland

Current ward
- Created: 2019
- Councillor: Paul Ralph Kimber (Labour)
- Councillor: Pete Roper (Independents for Dorset)
- Councillor: Susan Cocking (Independents for Dorset)
- Number of councillors: 3

Portland is an electoral ward in Dorset. Since 2019, the ward has elected 3 councillors to Dorset Council.

== Geography ==
The Portland ward covers the entire Isle of Portland.

== Councillors ==
Election	Councillors		
2019	Paul Ralph Kimber (Labour)	Rob Hughes (Alliance for Local Living)	Susan Cocking (Alliance for Local Living)
2024	Paul Ralph Kimber (Labour)	Rob Hughes (Independents for Dorset)	Pete Roper (Independents for Dorset)

== Election ==
=== 2024 Dorset Council election ===
Portland
Party	Candidate	Votes	%	±%
Independents for Dorset	Pete Roper	899	35.6	New
Independents for Dorset	Rob Hughes*	895	35.5	-1.8
Labour	Paul Ralph Kimber*	875	34.7	+2.5
Green	Catherine Bennett	785	31.1	+6.4
Independents for Dorset	Susan Cocking*	744	29.5	−2.2
Labour	Carralyn Paula Parkes	724	28.7	−1.3
Labour	Bernard Edward Parkes	546	21.6	−2.3
Conservative	Margaret Caroline Gadd	342	13.6	−12.3
Conservative	Ian Munro-Price	244	9.7	−14.4
Conservative	Maureen Quinn	224	8.9	−11.3
Liberal Democrats	Holly Hope	120	4.8	New
Liberal Democrats	Lee Daniel Harmsworth	75	3.0	New
Liberal Democrats	Gillian Pearson	74	2.9	New
Turnout		2,522	27.24	
Independents for Dorset hold		Swing		
Independents for Dorset hold		Swing		
Labour hold		Swing		

=== 2019 Dorset Council election ===
2019 Dorset Council election: Portland (3 seats)
Party	Candidate	Votes	%	±%
Independent	Rob Hughes	1,052	37.3	
Labour	Paul Ralph Kimber	910	32.2	
Independent	Susan Cocking	894	31.7	
Labour	Giovanna Elizabeth Lewis	847	30.0	
Conservative	Katharine Muriel Garcia	732	25.9	
Green	Sara Ann Harpley	697	24.7	
Conservative	Su Illsley	680	24.1	
Labour	Ray Nowak	675	23.9	
Conservative	Chris Wakefield	571	20.2	
Independent	Tim Munro	447	15.8	
Majority				
Turnout		2,824	30.49	
Independent win (new seat)				
Labour win (new seat)				
Independent win (new seat)				

== See also ==
- List of electoral wards in Dorset
