= 2019 Dorset Council election =

2019 UK local government election

- 2 May 2019

All 82 seats to Dorset Council 42 seats needed for a majority

	First party	Second party	Third party
Party	Conservative	Liberal Democrats	Green
Seats won	43	29	4
Popular vote	43,656	35,012	11,021
Percentage	36.3%	29.1%	9.2%
	Fourth party	Fifth party
Party	Independent	Labour
Seats won	4	2
Popular vote	10,466	13,077
Percentage	8.7%	10.9%
- Map showing the results of the 2019 Dorset Council elections.
Leader before election
Spencer Flower
Conservative
Leader after election
Spencer Flower
Conservative

The 2019 Dorset Council election was held on Thursday 2 May 2019 to elect councillors to the new Dorset Council in England. It took place on the same day as other district council elections in the United Kingdom.

These were the first elections to the new unitary council, which has come into effect on 1 April 2019. The new unitary authority was created to administer most of the area formerly administered by Dorset County Council, which was previously subdivided into the districts of Weymouth and Portland, West Dorset, North Dorset, Purbeck, and East Dorset. The previous elections in for Dorset County Council took place in 2017, and for the former district councils in 2015 and 2016. Future elections will take place in 2024 and 2029, and then every 4 years.

The 2019 election saw the Conservatives take a majority of seats on the Council.

== Council composition ==
Prior to the election the composition of the shadow authority was:

↓
120	31	11	8	2
Con	LD	Lab	I	G

After the election the composition of the council was:

↓
43	29	4	4	2
Con	LD	G	I	Lab

== Summary ==
=== Election result ===
2019 Dorset Council election
Party	Candidates	Seats	Gains	Losses	Net gain/loss	Seats %	Votes %	Votes	+/−
Conservative	82	43	N/A	N/A	N/A	52.4	36.3	43,656	N/A
Liberal Democrats	68	29	N/A	N/A	N/A	35.4	29.1	35,012	N/A
Green	23	4	N/A	N/A	N/A	4.9	9.2	11,021	N/A
Independent	28	4	N/A	N/A	N/A	4.9	8.7	10,466	N/A
Labour	64	2	N/A	N/A	N/A	2.4	10.9	13,077	N/A
UKIP	30	0	N/A	N/A	N/A	0.0	5.9	7,125	N/A

== Ward results ==
=== Beacon ===
Beacon
Party	Candidate	Votes	%	±%
Conservative	Jane Somper	1,020	64.4	
Liberal Democrats	Alexandra Gale	423	26.7	
Labour	Samuel Charles Skey	142	9.0	
Majority		597	37.7	
Turnout		1,649	42.60	
Registered electors		3,870		
Conservative win (new seat)				

=== Beaminster ===
Beaminster
Party	Candidate	Votes	%	±%
Conservative	Rebecca Knox	678	47.9	
Liberal Democrats	Chris Turner	532	37.6	
Green	Robert Sean Casey	141	10.0	
Labour	Stephen Everington	63	4.5	
Majority		146	10.3	
Turnout		1,444	42.10	
Registered electors		3,429		
Conservative win (new seat)				

=== Blackmore Vale ===
Blackmore Vale
Party	Candidate	Votes	%	±%
Conservative	Pauline Hannah Batstone	912	61.8	
UKIP	Bill Woodhouse	224	15.2	
Liberal Democrats	Ian De Carteret Edlin	215	14.6	
Labour	Kevin Thomas James Shillington	124	8.4	
Majority		688	45.3	
Turnout			40.70	
Registered electors		3,608		
Conservative win (new seat)				

Pauline Batstone was subsequently elected the first chair of the council.

=== Blandford ===
Blandford (2 seats)
Party	Candidate	Votes	%	±%
Conservative	Byron Robert Quayle	1,573	55.0	
Conservative	Noc Lacey-Clarke	1,495	52.2	
Liberal Democrats	Hugo Anthony Mieville	774	27.0	
Liberal Democrats	John Edward Thomas Tanner	761	26.6	
Labour	Pat Osborne	509	17.8	
Labour	Doro Russell	362	12.6	
Majority		721	25.2	
Turnout		2,862	35.80	
Registered electors		8,125		
Conservative win (new seat)				
Conservative win (new seat)				

=== Bridport ===
Bridport (3 seats)
Party	Candidate	Votes	%	±%
Liberal Democrats	Sarah Williams	1,891	42.3	
Green	Kelvin Charles Clayton	1,606	35.9	
Liberal Democrats	Dave Bolwell	1,489	33.3	
Conservative	Derek Raymond Bussell	1,172	26.2	
Conservative	Ronald William Coatsworth	1,138	25.4	
Conservative	Una Mary Christopher	1,040	23.3	
Liberal Democrats	Iain Douglas Young	893	20.0	
Labour	Nick Boothroyd	773	17.3	
Labour	Mark Gage	734	16.4	
UKIP	Heath Barrett	643	14.4	
Labour	Bill Mellish	630	14.1	
Majority				
Turnout		4,473	37.37	
Registered electors		12,103		
Liberal Democrats win (new seat)				
Green win (new seat)				
Liberal Democrats win (new seat)				

=== Chalk Valleys ===
Chalk Valleys
Party	Candidate	Votes	%	±%
Conservative	Jill Haynes	810	50.4	
Green	Carol Rosemary Byrom	447	27.8	
Liberal Democrats	Michael John Sandy	351	21.8	
Majority		363	22.6	
Turnout		1,645	42.30	
Registered electors		3,890		
Conservative win (new seat)				

=== Charminster St Mary's ===
Charminster St Mary's
Party	Candidate	Votes	%	±%
Liberal Democrats	David Taylor	846	53.5	
Conservative	Tim Yarker	472	29.8	
Independent	Richard David Denton-White	176	11.1	
Labour	Michael John Maher	88	5.6	
Majority				
Turnout		1,605	42.20	
Registered electors		3,803		
Liberal Democrats win (new seat)				

=== Chesil Bank ===
Chesil Bank
Party	Candidate	Votes	%	±%
Conservative	Mark Brandon Roberts	595	39.2	
Green	Vaughan Jones	503	33.1	
Liberal Democrats	Sally Anne Holland	316	20.8	
Labour	Richard Howard Nicholls	105	6.9	
Majority				
Turnout		1,559	47.10	
Registered electors		3,310		
Conservative win (new seat)				

=== Chickerell ===
Chickerell (2 seats)
Party	Candidate	Votes	%	±%
Conservative	Jean Dunseith	766	42.3	
Independent	John Howard Worth	564	31.1	
Conservative	Mike Byatt	542	29.9	
Green	Graham Lambert	376	20.7	
Liberal Democrats	Holly Bessant	339	18.7	
Liberal Democrats	James Alexander Lane Canning	283	15.6	
Labour	Valerie Ann Ashenden	275	15.2	
Majority				
Turnout		1,813	30.56	
Registered electors		6,040		
Conservative win (new seat)				
Independent win (new seat)				

=== Colehill and Wimborne Minster East ===
Colehill and Wimborne Minster East (2 seats)
Party	Candidate	Votes	%	±%
Liberal Democrats	Janet Dover	1,616	57.4	
Liberal Democrats	Maria Angela Roe	1,073	38.1	
Conservative	KD Johnson	968	34.4	
Conservative	David Geoffrey Lawson Packer	771	27.4	
Green	Derek Baker	477	17.0	
UKIP	Nick Wellstead	319	11.3	
Labour	David Francis Moore	145	5.2	
Majority				
Turnout		2,814	41.26	
Registered electors		6,860		
Liberal Democrats win (new seat)				
Liberal Democrats win (new seat)				

=== Corfe Mullen ===
Corfe Mullen (2 seats)
Party	Candidate	Votes	%	±%
Liberal Democrats	Mike Barron	1,388	47.7	
Conservative	Paul Ronald Harrison	1,292	44.4	
Liberal Democrats	Duncan Anthony Sowry-House	1,138	39.1	
Conservative	Sarah Jayne Burns	1,093	37.6	
Green	Tracie Stevens	374	12.9	
Labour	David Peden	222	7.6	
Majority				
Turnout		2,909	37.07	
Registered electors		8,015		
Liberal Democrats win (new seat)				
Conservative win (new seat)				

=== Cranborne and Alderholt ===
Cranborne and Alderholt
Party	Candidate	Votes	%	±%
Liberal Democrats	David Lawrence Tooke	689	46.7	
Conservative	Steve Butler	671	45.5	
Labour	Peter Thomas Parsons	116	7.9	
Majority				
Turnout		1,508	37.90	
Registered electors		3,978		
Liberal Democrats win (new seat)				

=== Cranborne Chase ===
Cranborne Chase
Party	Candidate	Votes	%	±%
Conservative	Piers Brown	778	65.6	
Labour	Dennis Wardleworth	208	17.5	
UKIP	Stephen Mark Kelly	200	16.9	
Majority				
Turnout		1,230	36.70	
Registered electors		3,352		
Conservative win (new seat)				

=== Crossways ===
Crossways
Party	Candidate	Votes	%	±%
Liberal Democrats	Nick Ireland	746	62.3	
Conservative	Barry Michael Quinn	360	30.1	
Labour	Mollie Joy Collins	91	7.6	
Majority				
Turnout		1,229	40.70	
Registered electors		3,019		
Liberal Democrats win (new seat)				

Ireland was later elected leader for the Liberal Democrat group.

=== Dorchester East ===
Dorchester East (2 seats)
Party	Candidate	Votes	%	±%
Liberal Democrats	Molly Rennie	1,755	64.2	
Liberal Democrats	Stella Jones	1,739	63.6	
Conservative	Anthony James Kirkpatrick Austin	559	20.5	
Conservative	Andrew William Charles Christopher	487	17.8	
Labour	Claudia Sorin	448	16.4	
Labour	Barry Thompson	369	13.5	
Majority				
Turnout		2,733	41.70	
Registered electors		6,735		
Liberal Democrats win (new seat)				
Liberal Democrats win (new seat)				

=== Dorchester Poundbury ===
Dorchester Poundbury
Party	Candidate	Votes	%	±%
Liberal Democrats	Richard Biggs	457	35.9	
Conservative	Peter Jonathon Stein	415	32.6	
Independent	William Gibbons	273	21.4	
Green	Tim Oram	73	5.7	
Labour	Sinead McCarney	55	4.3	
Majority				
Turnout		1,282	46.20	
Registered electors		2,775		
Liberal Democrats win (new seat)				

=== Dorchester West ===
Dorchester West (2 seats)
Party	Candidate	Votes	%	±%
Liberal Democrats	Andy Canning	1,221	44.7	
Independent	Les Fry	1,064	38.9	
Liberal Democrats	Janet Elizabeth Hewitt	973	35.6	
Conservative	Gerald Duke	512	18.7	
Green	Len Herbert	434	15.9	
Conservative	Ian Francois Bernard Gosling	336	12.3	
Labour	Jules Daulby	289	10.6	
Labour	Tracee Lorraine Cossey	264	9.7	
Majority				
Turnout		2,733	39.51	
Registered electors		7,040		
Liberal Democrats win (new seat)				
Independent win (new seat)				

Fry was later elected leader of the all for Dorset independent group.

=== Eggardon ===
Eggardon
Party	Candidate	Votes	%	±%
Conservative	Anthony Paul Robin Alford	735	48.0	
Green	Anne Elizabeth Clements	362	23.7	
Liberal Democrats	Robin Potter	271	17.7	
Labour	Lucy Campbell	162	10.6	
Majority				
Turnout		1,576	37.50	
Registered electors		4,203		
Conservative win (new seat)				

=== Ferndown North ===
Ferndown North (2 seats)
Party	Candidate	Votes	%	±%
Conservative	Cathy Lugg	1,312	54.1	
Conservative	Mike Parkes	1,221	50.3	
Liberal Democrats	Matthew Coussell	578	23.8	
Liberal Democrats	Peter Durant	545	22.5	
UKIP	Alan Albert Miller	521	21.5	
UKIP	Jade Cadman	492	20.3	
Majority				
Turnout		2,426	33.40	
Registered electors		7,402		
Conservative win (new seat)				
Conservative win (new seat)				

=== Ferndown South ===
Ferndown South (2 seats)
Party	Candidate	Votes	%	±%
Conservative	Julie Lorraine Robinson	765	38.9	
Conservative	Rod Adkins	689	35.0	
UKIP	Geoff Laidlaw	536	27.3	
UKIP	Lawrence Wilson	487	24.8	
Liberal Democrats	Philip Carl Bamborough	474	24.1	
Independent	Paul Hanson Graham	371	18.9	
Labour	Suzanne M Roffe	264	13.4	
Majority				
Turnout		1,966	29.83	
Registered electors		6,683		
Conservative win (new seat)				
Conservative win (new seat)				

=== Gillingham ===
Gillingham (3 seats)
Party	Candidate	Votes	%	±%
Conservative	Belinda Ridout	1,799	43.4	
Conservative	Valerie Rose Pothecary	1,682	40.6	
Conservative	David Walsh	1,626	39.2	
Liberal Democrats	Barry Von Clemens	1,245	30.0	
Liberal Democrats	Mike Gould	958	23.1	
Independent	Mark Jonathan White	853	20.6	
Liberal Democrats	John William Butcher	765	18.5	
UKIP	Nick Edmunds	582	14.0	
UKIP	Peter Caulfield	533	12.9	
UKIP	Jane Unwin	497	12.0	
Labour	Fiona Jane Cullen	433	10.4	
Labour	Philip Peter Wilson	415	10.0	
Labour	Paul Taylor	322	7.8	
Majority				
Turnout		4,145	34.19	
Registered electors		12,243		
Conservative win (new seat)				
Conservative win (new seat)				
Conservative win (new seat)				

=== Hill Forts and Upper Tarrants ===
Hill Forts and Upper Tarrants
Party	Candidate	Votes	%	±%
Conservative	Sherry Jespersen	854	60.5	
Liberal Democrats	Joe Hickish	336	23.8	
Labour	Alan Cross	221	15.7	
Majority				
Turnout		1,445	40.00	
Registered electors		3,613		
Conservative win (new seat)				

=== Littlemoor and Preston ===
Littlemoor and Preston (2 seats)
Party	Candidate	Votes	%	±%
Conservative	Tony Ferrari	1,078	35.3	
Conservative	Louie James O`Leary	988	32.4	
Independent	Michael McCallister Wilkinson	741	24.3	
Labour	Mark Richard Tewkesbury	719	23.6	
Liberal Democrats	Gillian Pearson	629	20.6	
Labour	Ann Weaving	527	17.3	
Green	John Victor Tomblin	505	16.6	
Independent	David Skinner	347	11.4	
Majority				
Turnout		3,050	40.15	
Registered electors		7,751		
Conservative win (new seat)				
Conservative win (new seat)				

O'Leary was the youngest elected councillor aged 20. Cllr Ferrari became the cabinet member for finance and assets.

=== Lyme and Charmouth ===
Lyme and Charmouth
Party	Candidate	Votes	%	±%
Conservative	Daryl Whane Turner	756	40.1	
Independent	Cheryl Lesley Reynolds	571	30.3	
Green	Rob Smith	317	16.8	
Labour	Rikey Austin	239	12.7	
Majority				
Turnout		1,929	44.90	
Registered electors		4,296		
Conservative win (new seat)				

=== Lytchett Matravers and Upton ===
Lytchett Matravers and Upton (3 seats)
Party	Candidate	Votes	%	±%
Conservative	Bill Pipe	1,472	45.4	
Liberal Democrats	Andrew James Starr	1,441	44.4	
Liberal Democrats	Alex Brenton	1,339	41.3	
Conservative	Robin Guy Sequeira	1,312	40.4	
Conservative	Ralph Turvill Watts	1,235	38.1	
Liberal Democrats	John Brian Taylor	1,092	33.7	
Green	Natalie Carswell	702	21.6	
Labour	Frank Duncan Milsom	314	9.7	
Majority				
Turnout		3,244	35.00	
Registered electors		9,424		
Conservative win (new seat)				
Liberal Democrats win (new seat)				
Liberal Democrats win (new seat)				

=== Marshwood Vale ===
Marshwood Vale
Party	Candidate	Votes	%	±%
Conservative	Simon John Christopher	752	39.0	
Independent	Jacqui Sewell	595	30.9	
Green	Simon Fairlie	308	16.0	
Liberal Democrats	Eddie Gerrard	187	9.7	
Labour	Phyllida Culpin	85	4.4	
Majority				
Turnout		2,113	50.30	
Registered electors		4,200		
Conservative win (new seat)				

=== Melcombe Regis ===
Melcombe Regis
Party	Candidate	Votes	%	±%
Green	Jon Orrell	691	62.8	
Conservative	James William Farquharson	220	20.0	
Labour	Tia Roos	190	17.3	
Majority				
Turnout		1,131	33.00	
Registered electors		3,428		
Green win (new seat)				

=== Portland ===
Portland (3 seats)
Party	Candidate	Votes	%	±%
Independent	Rob Hughes	1,052	37.3	
Labour	Paul Ralph Kimber	910	32.2	
Independent	Susan Cocking	894	31.7	
Labour	Giovanna Elizabeth Lewis	847	30.0	
Conservative	Katharine Muriel Garcia	732	25.9	
Green	Sara Ann Harpley	697	24.7	
Conservative	Su Illsley	680	24.1	
Labour	Ray Nowak	675	23.9	
Conservative	Chris Wakefield	571	20.2	
Independent	Tim Munro	447	15.8	
Majority				
Turnout		2,824	30.49	
Registered electors		9,443		
Independent win (new seat)				
Labour win (new seat)				
Independent win (new seat)				

Kimber was later elected leader of the labour and co-op group.

=== Puddletown and Lower Winterborne ===
Puddletown and Lower Winterborne
Party	Candidate	Votes	%	±%
Conservative	Emma Jayne Parker	789	48.5	
Liberal Democrats	Helen Frances	388	23.9	
Independent	Kevin Nicholas Maitland-Gleed	257	15.8	
Labour	Emma Elizabeth Bratley	192	11.8	
Majority		401	24.6	
Turnout		1,678	38.40	
Registered electors		4,370		
Conservative win (new seat)				

=== Radipole ===
Radipole (2 seats)
Party	Candidate	Votes	%	±%
Liberal Democrats	Peter Lawrence Fraser Barrow	1,346	51.3	
Liberal Democrats	David Michael Gray	1,234	47.0	
Conservative	Peter Dickenson	709	27.0	
Conservative	John Twidale Ellis	671	25.6	
Labour	Mark Duxbury	541	20.6	
Labour	Grafton Alphonso Straker	62	2.4	
Majority				
Turnout		2,624	36.48	
Registered electors		7,466		
Liberal Democrats win (new seat)				
Liberal Democrats win (new seat)				

=== Rodwell and Wyke ===
Rodwell and Wyke (3 seats)
Party	Candidate	Votes	%	±%
Green	Clare Sutton	2,033	49.4	
Labour	Kate Wheller	1,403	34.1	
Green	Brian Heatley	1,258	30.6	
Green	Daragh Edwin Croxson	1,062	25.8	
Labour	Becky Suzanne Blake	965	23.5	
Conservative	Richard Douglas Nickinson	911	22.2	
Independent	Luke Michael Wakeling	908	22.1	
Conservative	Joanna Mary Dickenson	862	21.0	
Conservative	Michael James Bevan	835	20.3	
Labour	Lucy Hamilton	830	20.2	
Majority				
Turnout		4,112	37.68	
Registered electors		11,110		
Green win (new seat)				
Labour win (new seat)				
Green win (new seat)				

Sutton was elected as leader of the green group on the council.

=== Shaftesbury Town ===
Shaftesbury Town (2 seats)
Party	Candidate	Votes	%	±%
Liberal Democrats	Derek Leslie Beer	1,177	50.6	
Liberal Democrats	Tim Cook	682	29.3	
Conservative	Julian Pritchard	480	20.6	
Conservative	Alexander Edward Chase	381	16.4	
Independent	Andrew Reginald Hollingshead	360	15.5	
Independent	Peter David Yeo	273	11.7	
UKIP	Lester Geoffrey Taylor	250	10.7	
UKIP	Steve Unwin	233	10.0	
Labour	Melanie Costas	213	9.2	
Independent	Lester Mark Dibben	147	6.3	
Labour	William Kenealy	145	6.2	
Majority				
Turnout		2,326	35.21	
Registered electors		6,677		
Liberal Democrats win (new seat)				
Liberal Democrats win (new seat)				

=== Sherborne East ===
Sherborne East
Party	Candidate	Votes	%	±%
Liberal Democrats	Jon Andrews	842	49.6	
Conservative	Jill Warburton	615	36.2	
UKIP	Alan Gordon Taylor	122	7.2	
Green	Ken Huggins	120	7.1	
Majority				
Turnout		1,715	44.50	
Registered electors		3,853		
Liberal Democrats win (new seat)				

=== Sherborne Rural ===
Sherborne Rural
Party	Candidate	Votes	%	±%
Liberal Democrats	Robin Andrew Shane Legg	902	53.4	
Conservative	Peter Robert Shorland	583	34.5	
UKIP	Leon Jennings	204	12.1	
Majority				
Turnout		1,706	42.70	
Registered electors		3,995		
Liberal Democrats win (new seat)				

=== Sherborne West ===
Sherborne West
Party	Candidate	Votes	%	±%
Liberal Democrats	Matt Hall	759	53.6	
Conservative	Rebecca Burns	538	38.0	
Green	Pam Rosling	119	8.4	
Majority				
Turnout		1,446	42.40	
Registered electors		3,410		
Liberal Democrats win (new seat)				

=== South East Purbeck ===
South East Purbeck
Party	Candidate	Votes	%	±%
Conservative	Cherry Louise Brooks	499	30.7	
Independent	Nigel Dragon	451	27.7	
Liberal Democrats	Mandy Platts	284	17.5	
Labour	George Holden	191	11.7	
UKIP	John Barnes	117	7.2	
Independent	Matt Etherington	84	5.2	
Majority				
Turnout		1,643	46.80	
Registered electors		3,510		
Conservative win (new seat)				

=== St Leonards and St Ives ===
St Leonards and St Ives (2 seats)
Party	Candidate	Votes	%	±%
Conservative	Barry Peter Goringe	1,406	55.6	
Conservative	Ray Bryan	1,363	53.9	
UKIP	Robin Frances Grey	604	23.9	
Liberal Democrats	Ulrike Lucas	590	23.3	
UKIP	Allan Stephen Tallett	482	19.1	
Labour	Steve Hards	286	11.3	
Majority				
Turnout		2,529	40.70	
Registered electors		6,247		
Conservative win (new seat)				
Conservative win (new seat)				

=== Stalbridge and Marnhull ===
Stalbridge and Marnhull
Party	Candidate	Votes	%	±%
Conservative	Graham Carr-Jones	837	47.6	
Liberal Democrats	Ros Eveleigh	541	30.8	
UKIP	Rory Herbert	246	14.0	
Labour	Pippa Shillington	135	7.7	
Majority				
Turnout		1,792	42.30	
Registered electors		4,237		
Conservative win (new seat)				

=== Stour and Allen Vale ===
Stour and Allen Vale
Party	Candidate	Votes	%	±%
Conservative	Robin David Cook	606	43.5	
Liberal Democrats	Joanna Jane Bury	328	23.5	
Independent	Francis Edward Raven-Vause	201	14.4	
UKIP	Michael Simmons	165	11.8	
Labour	Stephen Gerry	94	6.7	
Majority				
Turnout		1,408	35.80	
Registered electors		3,933		
Conservative win (new seat)				

=== Sturminster Newton ===
Sturminster Newton
Party	Candidate	Votes	%	±%
Conservative	Carole Yvonne Jones	442	32.5	
Independent	Michael Roake	399	29.3	
Liberal Democrats	David Fox	360	26.4	
UKIP	Sam Edmunds	102	7.5	
Labour	Craig Andrew White	59	4.3	
Majority				
Turnout		1,371	38.70	
Registered electors		3,543		
Conservative win (new seat)				

=== Swanage ===
Swanage (2 seats)
Party	Candidate	Votes	%	±%
Conservative	Gary Maurice Suttle	1,546	45.9	
Conservative	William Stanley Trite	1,457	43.3	
Labour	Debby Monkhouse	780	23.2	
Independent	Philip Michael Eades	677	20.1	
Labour	Chris Bradey	614	18.2	
Liberal Democrats	Gill Calvin Thomas	592	17.6	
Liberal Democrats	Cliff Sutton	469	13.9	
Independent	Jason Paul Haiselden	351	10.4	
Majority				
Turnout		3,368	42.38	
Registered electors		8,009		
Conservative win (new seat)				
Conservative win (new seat)				

=== Upwey and Broadwey ===
Upwey and Broadwey
Party	Candidate	Votes	%	±%
Liberal Democrats	Howard Richard Legg	555	41.1	
Conservative	Kevin Brookes	543	40.3	
Labour	Debra Kohana	251	18.6	
Majority				
Turnout		1,403	37.00	
Registered electors		3,791		
Liberal Democrats win (new seat)				

=== Verwood ===
Verwood (3 seats)
Party	Candidate	Votes	%	±%
Conservative	Simon Gibson	2,235	63.6	
Conservative	Toni Bartley Coombs	2,083	59.2	
Conservative	Spencer Grant Flower	1,946	55.3	
Green	Bridie Salmon	736	20.9	
Liberal Democrats	Ginette Marie Holdroyd	565	16.1	
Green	Peter Jonathan Lucas	546	15.5	
UKIP	John Baxter	499	14.2	
UKIP	Peter Grant	480	13.7	
Labour	James Andrew McKenzie	306	8.7	
Labour	Maryanne Pike	228	6.5	
Labour	Sandra Joy Turner	227	6.5	
Majority				
Turnout		3,516	33.60	
Registered electors		10,586		
Conservative win (new seat)				
Conservative win (new seat)				
Conservative win (new seat)				

Flower was later elected as the first leader of the council.

=== Wareham ===
Wareham (2 seats)
Party	Candidate	Votes	%	±%
Liberal Democrats	Beryl Rita Ezzard	1,837	57.1	
Liberal Democrats	Ryan David Holloway	1,308	40.6	
Conservative	Mark Unsworth	965	30.0	
Conservative	Mike Wiggins	942	29.3	
UKIP	Keith Allen Simpson	431	13.4	
Labour	Cherry Ann Bartlett	365	11.3	
Labour	Alice Jane Blachford Rogers	219	6.8	
Majority				
Turnout		3,219	41.16	
Registered electors		7,880		
Liberal Democrats win (new seat)				
Liberal Democrats win (new seat)				

=== West Moors and Three Legged Cross ===
West Moors and Three Legged Cross (2 seats)
Party	Candidate	Votes	%	±%
Conservative	David William Shortell	1,412	57.3	
Conservative	Michael Roy Dyer	1,323	53.7	
UKIP	David Richard Marshall	596	24.2	
Liberal Democrats	Marlies Koutstaal	541	22.0	
UKIP	Mark Wadeson	447	18.1	
Liberal Democrats	Lars Wilmar	432	17.5	
Majority				
Turnout		2,463	33.35	
Registered electors		7,507		
Conservative win (new seat)				
Conservative win (new seat)				

=== West Parley ===
West Parley
Party	Candidate	Votes	%	±%
Conservative	Andrew Charles Parry	611	62.5	
UKIP	Ann Josephine Miller	201	20.6	
Liberal Democrats	Jocelyn Grace Lortie	165	16.9	
Majority				
Turnout		984	32.10	
Registered electors		3,066		
Conservative win (new seat)				

=== West Purbeck ===
West Purbeck (2 seats)
Party	Candidate	Votes	%	±%
Conservative	Laura Jane Miller	1,142	44.1	
Conservative	Peter Kendrick Wharf	1,064	41.1	
Independent	Malcolm Leonard Shakesby	848	32.7	
Liberal Democrats	David H Bhattacharjee	556	21.5	
Liberal Democrats	David Sinclair Burden	375	14.5	
Labour	Jon Davey	307	11.8	
Labour	Nick Chaffey	288	11.1	
Majority				
Turnout		2,591	36.59	
Registered electors		7,144		
Conservative win (new seat)				
Conservative win (new seat)				

Wharf was later appointed deputy leader of the council

=== Westham ===
Westham (2 seats)
Party	Candidate	Votes	%	±%
Liberal Democrats	Ryan Dean Hope	895	46.1	
Liberal Democrats	Gill Taylor	836	43.0	
Labour	Sara Louise Greenhalf	471	24.2	
Labour	David Joseph Greenhalf	441	22.7	
Conservative	Clare Louise Williams	366	18.8	
Conservative	Tom Tannassee	345	17.8	
Majority				
Turnout		1,943	29.61	
Registered electors		6,853		
Liberal Democrats win (new seat)				
Liberal Democrats win (new seat)				

=== Wimborne Minster ===
Wimborne Minster (2 seats)
Party	Candidate	Votes	%	±%
Liberal Democrats	Shane Kevin Bartlett	1,296	65.5	
Liberal Democrats	David Morgan	1,155	58.4	
Conservative	Derek Bidkar Frank Burt	514	26.0	
Conservative	Colin Robin William Beck	509	25.7	
Labour	Stewart William Bullen	192	9.7	
Labour	Ashley Wynne Rowlands	182	9.2	
Majority				
Turnout		1,979	36.42	
Registered electors		5,526		
Liberal Democrats win (new seat)				
Liberal Democrats win (new seat)				

=== Winterborne and Broadmayne ===
Winterborne and Broadmayne
Party	Candidate	Votes	%	±%
Liberal Democrats	Roland Tarr	799	56.6	
Conservative	Robert Philip Freeman	412	29.2	
UKIP	Graham Richard Brant	201	14.2	
Majority				
Turnout		1,450	41.20	
Registered electors		3,519		
Liberal Democrats win (new seat)				

=== Winterborne North ===
Winterborne North
Party	Candidate	Votes	%	±%
Conservative	Andrew Kerby	557	39.9	
Liberal Democrats	Barrie Cooper	363	26.0	
UKIP	Christine Adey	162	11.6	
Independent	James Bernard Mayo	105	7.5	
Labour	Haydn Roger White	102	7.3	
Independent	John Stayt	88	6.3	
Independent	Jason Williamson	19	1.4	
Majority				
Turnout		1,396	41.90	
Registered electors		3,331		
Conservative win (new seat)				

=== Yetminster ===
Yetminster
Party	Candidate	Votes	%	±%
Conservative	Mary Penfold	910	52.9	
Liberal Democrats	Tim Fearon	611	35.5	
UKIP	Philip Lee Broomfield	200	11.6	
Majority				
Turnout		1,744	43.40	
Registered electors		4,019		
Conservative win (new seat)				

== Changes 2019–2024 ==
- Susan Cocking, Les Fry, Rob Hughes and John Worth, all elected as independents, subsequently sat as members of the Alliance for Local Living, which was in the process of being set up as a registered party when nominations for the 2019 election closed. It was deregistered as a political party in November 2023 but they continued to sit together as a group, before registering as a new political party called Independents for Dorset in February 2024.
- Kate Wheller, elected for Labour, left the party in October 2019 to join the Alliance for Local Living. In May 2022 she left the ALL to sit as an independent. She re-joined Labour in January 2024.
- Mike Barron, elected as a Liberal Democrat, joined the Conservatives in December 2021.
- David Gray, elected as a Liberal Democrat, left the party in October 2022 to sit as an independent.

=== By-elections ===
==== Lyme & Charmouth ====
Lyme & Charmouth: 7 April 2022
Party	Candidate	Votes	%	±%
Green	Belinda Bawden	594	43.8	+27.0
Conservative	Victoria Anna Stocqueler	359	26.5	−13.7
Independent	Cheryl Lesley Reynolds	320	23.6	−6.7
Labour	David Hart	82	6.1	−6.6
Majority		235	17.3	
Turnout		1,357		
Green gain from Conservative		Swing	▲20.4	

The by-election was triggered by the resignation of the sitting Conservative councillor, Daryl Turner.

==== Sherborne West ====
Sherborne West: 29 June 2023
Party	Candidate	Votes	%	±%
Liberal Democrats	Richard Henry Geoffrey Crabb	589	50.8	–2.8
Conservative	Rebecca Burns	489	42.2	+4.2
Labour	Nicholas Boothroyd	81	7.0	N/A
Majority		100	8.6	
Turnout		1,135	30.5	
Registered electors		3,722		
Liberal Democrats hold		Swing	▼3.5	

The by-election was triggered by the resignation of the sitting Liberal Democrat councillor, Matt Hall.

==== Littlemoor & Preston ====
Littlemoor & Preston: 11 January 2024
Party	Candidate	Votes	%	±%
Conservative	Peter Dickenson	1,237	53.7	+18.4
Liberal Democrats	Simon Arthur Dewi Clifford	833	36.2	+15.6
Labour	Stephen Nicholas Brown	232	10.1	−13.5
Majority		404	17.5	
Turnout		2,302	30.8	
Registered electors		7,579		
Conservative hold		Swing	▲1.4	

The by-election was triggered by the death of the sitting Conservative councillor, Tony Ferrari, who collapsed while running.
