= Rodwell, Dorset =

Suburb of Weymouth, Dorset, England

Coordinates: 50°36′43.0″N 2°28′12.0″W

Rodwell
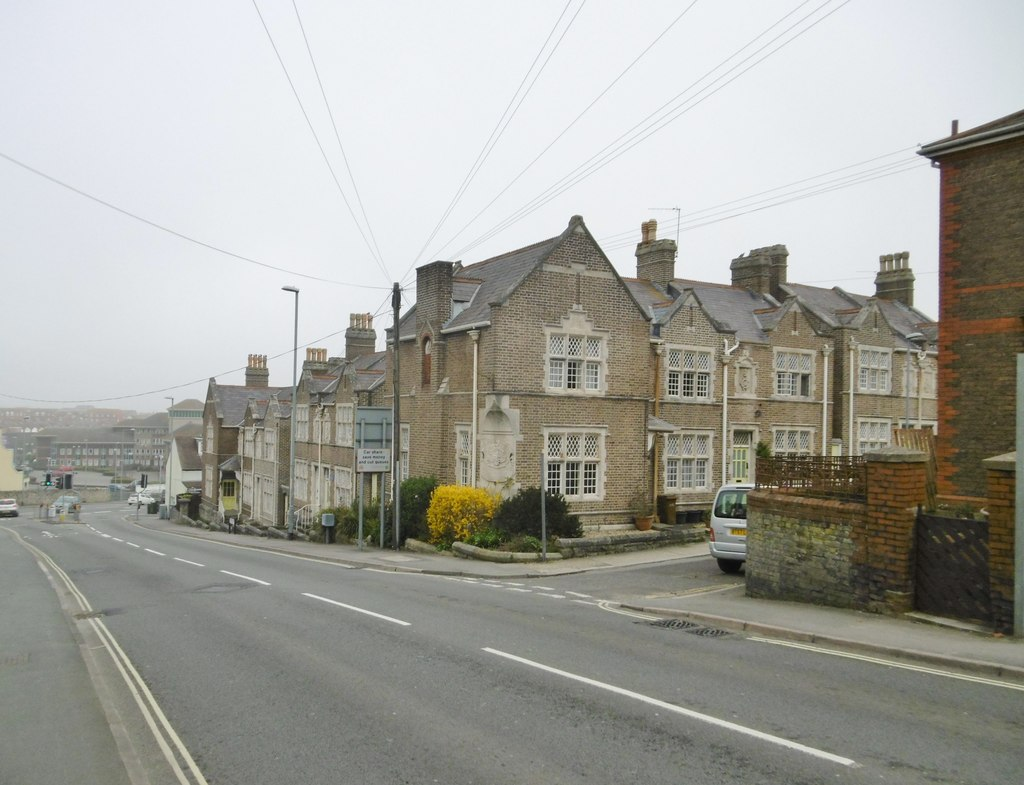
- Almshouses in Rodwell

- Location within Dorset
- Unitary authority: Dorset
- Ceremonial county: Dorset
- Region: South West
- Country: England
- Sovereign state: United Kingdom
- Post town: Weymouth
- Postcode district: DT4
- Police: Dorset
- Fire: Dorset and Wiltshire
- Ambulance: South Western
- UK Parliament: South Dorset

Rodwell is a suburb of Weymouth, Dorset, England.

== Places of interest ==
- Rodwell Trail
- Rodwell Railway Station

== Politics ==
Rodwell is part of South Dorset constituency for elections to the House of Commons of the United Kingdom.

Rodwell is part of the Rodwell and Wyke ward for elections to Dorset Council.
