= Chickerell (ward) =

Electoral ward in Dorset, England

- ward Dorset Council
- Population: 7,666
- Major settlements: Chickerell

Current ward
- Created: 2019
- Councillor: Gill Taylor (Liberal Democrats)
- Councillor: Simon Clifford (Liberal Democrats)
- Number of councillors: 2

Chickerell is an electoral ward in Dorset. Since 2019, the ward has elected 2 councillors to Dorset Council.

== Geography ==
The Chickerell ward is s based on the town of Chickerell outside Weymouth.

== Councillors ==
Election	Councillors	
2024	Gill Taylor (Liberal Democrats)	Simon Arthur Dewi Clifford (Liberal Democrats)
2019	Jean Dunseith (Conservative)	John Howard Worth (Alliance for Local Living)

== Election ==
=== 2024 Dorset Council election ===
2024 Dorset Council election: Chickerell (2 seats)
Party	Candidate	Votes	%	±%
Liberal Democrats	Gill Taylor	891	49.2	+29.5
Liberal Democrats	Simon Arthur Dewi Clifford	729	40.3	+24.7
Conservative	Jean Dunseith*	690	38.1	−4.2
Conservative	Andrew William MacLeod Reid	570	31.5	+1.6
Labour	Grafton Alphonso Straker	329	18.2	+3.0
Turnout		1,811	28.58	
Liberal Democrats gain from Conservative		Swing		
Liberal Democrats gain from Independent		Swing		

=== 2019 Dorset Council election ===
2019 Dorset Council election: Chickerell (2 seats)
Party	Candidate	Votes	%	±%
Conservative	Jean Dunseith	766	42.3	
Independent	John Howard Worth	564	31.1	
Conservative	Mike Byatt	542	29.9	
Green	Graham Lambert	376	20.7	
Liberal Democrats	Holly Bessant	339	18.7	
Liberal Democrats	James Alexander Lane Canning	283	15.6	
Labour	Valerie Ann Ashenden	275	15.2	
Majority				
Turnout		1,813	30.56	
Conservative win (new seat)				
Independent win (new seat)				

== See also ==
- List of electoral wards in Dorset
