= Rodwell and Wyke (ward) =

Electoral ward in Dorset, England

- ward Dorset Council
- Population: 14,199
- Major settlements: Rodwell and Wyke Regis

Current ward
- Created: 2019
- Councillor: Clare Sutton (Green)
- Councillor: Kate Wheller (Labour)
- Councillor: Claudia Webb (Green)
- Number of councillors: 3

Rodwell and Wyke is an electoral ward in Dorset. Since 2019, the ward has elected 3 councillors to Dorset Council.

== Geography ==
The Rodwell and Wyke ward covers the Weymouth suburbs of Newton's Cove, Rodwell and Wyke Regis.

== Councillors ==
Election	Councillors		
2019	Clare Sutton (Green)	Kate Wheller (Labour)	Brian Heatley (Green)
2024	Clare Sutton (Green)	Kate Wheller (Labour)	Claudia Webb (Green)

== Elections ==
=== 2019 Dorset Council election ===
Rodwell and Wyke (3 seats)
Party	Candidate	Votes	%	±%
Green	Clare Sutton	2,033	49.4	
Labour	Kate Wheller	1,403	34.1	
Green	Brian Heatley	1,258	30.6	
Green	Darragh Edwin Croxson	1,062	25.8	
Labour	Becky Suzanne Blake	965	23.5	
Conservative	Richard Douglas Nickinson	911	22.2	
Independent	Luke Michael Wakeling	908	22.1	
Conservative	Joanna Mary Dickenson	862	21.0	
Conservative	Michael James Bevan	835	20.3	
Labour	Lucy Hamilton	830	20.2	
Majority				
Turnout		4,112	37.68	
Green win (new seat)				
Labour win (new seat)				
Green win (new seat)				

=== 2024 Dorset Council election ===
Rodwell & Wyke
Party	Candidate	Votes	%	±%
Green	Clare Sutton*	1,516	44.9	−4.5
Labour	Kate Wheller*	1,385	41.0	+6.9
Green	Claudia Lucienne Webb	1,327	39.3	+8.7
Green	Valerie Jane Graves	1,199	35.5	+9.7
Labour	Antony Prowse	914	27.1	+3.6
Conservative	Caroline Joyce Nickinson	825	24.4	+3.4
Conservative	Richard Douglas Nickinson	756	22.4	+0.2
Labour	Thomas Taylor	700	20.7	+0.5
Conservative	Clare Louise Williams	644	19.1	−1.2
Turnout		3,377	31.69	
Green hold		Swing		
Labour hold		Swing		
Green hold		Swing		

== See also ==
- List of electoral wards in Dorset
