= Broadwey Methodist Church =

Former Methodist church in Broadwey, England

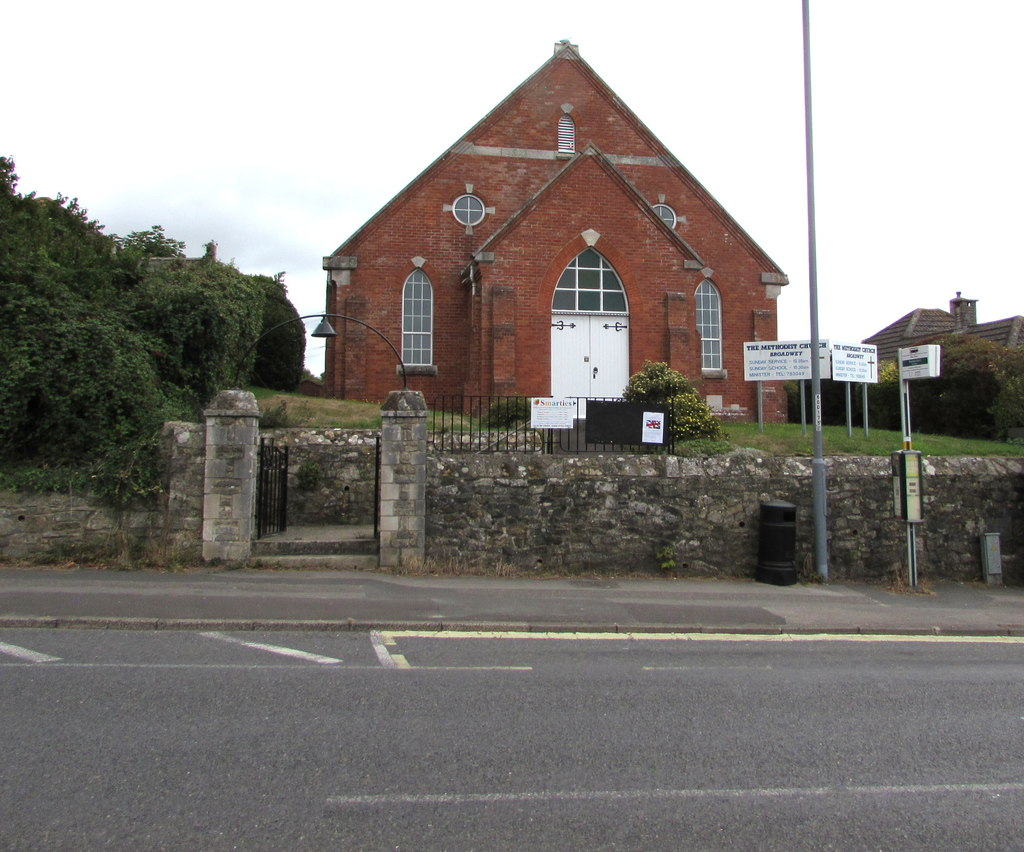

Religion
- Affiliation: Methodist
- Ecclesiastical or organizational status: Closed

Location
- Location: Broadwey, Dorset, England
- Interactive map of Broadwey Methodist Church
- Coordinates: 50.6493°N 2.4707°W

Architecture
- Type: Church
- Completed: 1928

Broadwey Methodist Church is a former Methodist church in Broadwey, Weymouth, Dorset, England. It was built in 1928 and was active as part of the Dorset South & West Methodist Circuit until 2021.

== History ==
Broadwey Methodist Church was built in 1928 to replace an earlier chapel in the village which was erected by the Wesleyan-Methodists in 1838. The foundation stone of the new church was laid by the church secretary, Mr. J. E. Gray, in April 1928. A number of fittings were transferred from the old chapel to the new building, including most of the seating, the pulpit and five memorial tablets. The new church cost around £2,700 to build.

The old chapel held its last service on 5 August 1928 and the new church was opened by Mrs. J. E. Gray on 8 August 1928, in the presence of a large gathering of Wesleyans from the Weymouth circuit. The dedication service was conducted by Rev. W. T. A. Barber, the Principal of the Richmond Training College in Cambridge. He was assisted by the superintendent minister of the Weymouth circuit, Rev. Sydney J. Rogers, Mr. F. J. Williams of the Weymouth circuit, Mr. J. E. Dixon of Nottingham (the son-in-law of the Mayor of Weymouth), Mr. Pentney of Padstow and Mr. Bollom of the London Wesleyan Mission Church.

In 1961, plans were drawn up by Donald Jackson of Weymouth for the construction of a Sunday School at the rear of the church. The interior of the church was modernised and redecorated during the early 1990s. The work included removing the pews and forming a glass-screened vestibule.

The church remained active as part of the Dorset South & West Methodist Circuit until 2021. For over 30 years, the Sunday school building was leased to Smarties Pre-school, originally known as Broadwey Playschool, until 2022.

In 2022, the church was put up for sale pending redevelopment. Dorset Council granted planning permission in 2023 to convert it into a family home. The external appearance of the building is to remain unchanged. The village's Wesleyan-Methodist chapel of 1838 is also now a private house.
