= South East Purbeck (ward) =

Electoral ward in Dorset, England

- ward Dorset Council
- Population: 4,148
- Major settlements: Corfe Castle, Kimmeridge

Current ward
- Created: 2019
- Councillor: Ben Wilson (Liberal Democrat)
- Number of councillors: 1

South East Purbeck is an electoral ward in Dorset. Since 2019, the ward has elected 1 councillor to Dorset Council.

== Geography ==
The South East Purbeck ward is rural and covers the southern and western parts of the Isle of Purbeck outside Swanage, including a small portion of land around Binnegar which lies beyond the traditional boundary of Purbeck, north of the River Frome and west of Luckford Lake stream.

It comprises nine civil parishes: Church Knowle, Corfe Castle, East Holme, East Stoke, Kimmeridge, Langton Matravers, Steeple with Tyneham, Studland and Worth Matravers.

== Councillors ==
Election	Councillors
2019	Cherry Brooks (Conservative)
2024	Ben Wilson (Liberal Democrats)

== Election ==
=== 2019 Dorset Council election ===
2019 Dorset Council election: South East Purbeck (1 seat)
Party	Candidate	Votes	%	±%
Conservative	Cherry Louise Brooks	499	30.7	
Independent	Nigel Dragon	451	27.7	
Liberal Democrats	Mandy Platts	284	17.5	
Labour	George Holden	191	11.7	
UKIP	John Barnes	117	7.2	
Independent	Matt Etherington	84	5.2	
Majority				
Turnout			46.80	
Conservative win (new seat)				

=== 2024 Dorset Council election ===
South East Purbeck
Party	Candidate	Votes	%	±%
Liberal Democrats	Ben Wilson	848	57.8	+40.3
Conservative	Cherry Louise Brooks*	523	35.7	+5.0
Labour	Peter Copp	95	6.5	−5.2
Turnout		1,466	42.57	
Liberal Democrats gain from Conservative		Swing		

== See also ==
- List of electoral wards in Dorset
