= Lytchett Matravers and Upton (ward) =

Electoral ward in Dorset, England

- ward Dorset Council
- Population: 12,748
- Major settlements: East Morden, Lytchett Matravers, Upton

Current ward
- Created: 2019
- Councillor: Steve Robinson (Liberal Democrats)
- Councillor: Andrew James Starr (Liberal Democrats)
- Councillor: Alex Brenton (Liberal Democrats)
- Number of councillors: 3

Lytchett Matravers and Upton is an electoral ward in Dorset. Since 2019, the ward has elected 3 councillors to Dorset Council.

== Geography ==
The Lytchett Matravers and Upton ward covers the towns of Lytchett Matravers and Upton as well as Beacon Hill and East Morden.

== Councillors ==
Election	Councillors		
2019	Bill Pipe (Conservative)	Andrew James Starr (Liberal Democrats)	Alex Brenton (Liberal Democrats)
2024	Steve Robinson (Liberal Democrats)	Andrew James Starr (Liberal Democrats)	Alex Brenton (Liberal Democrats)

== Elections ==
=== 2019 Dorset Council election ===
2019 Dorset Council election: Lytchett Matravers and Upton (3 seats)
Party	Candidate	Votes	%	±%
Conservative	Bill Pipe	1,472	45.4	
Liberal Democrats	Andrew James Starr	1,441	44.4	
Liberal Democrats	Alex Brenton	1,339	41.3	
Conservative	Robin Guy Sequeira	1,312	40.4	
Conservative	Ralph Turvill Watts	1,235	38.1	
Liberal Democrats	John Brian Taylor	1,092	33.7	
Green	Natalie Carswell	702	21.6	
Labour	Frank Duncan Milsom	314	9.7	
Majority				
Turnout		3,244	35.00	
Conservative win (new seat)				
Liberal Democrats win (new seat)				
Liberal Democrats win (new seat)				

=== 2024 Dorset Council election ===
Lytchett Matravers and Upton
Party	Candidate	Votes	%	±%
Liberal Democrats	Steve Robinson	1,356	50.7	+17.0
Liberal Democrats	Alex Brenton*	1,354	50.7	+9.4
Liberal Democrats	Andrew James Starr*	1,155	43.2	−1.2
Conservative	Bill Pipe*	1,073	40.2	−5.2
Conservative	Sean Gabriel	965	36.1	−4.3
Conservative	Stew McKell	928	34.7	−3.4
Labour	John Patrick Billington	363	13.6	+3.9
Turnout		2,672	27.72	
Liberal Democrats gain from Conservative		Swing		
Liberal Democrats hold		Swing		
Liberal Democrats hold		Swing		

== See also ==
- List of electoral wards in Dorset
