= Stoke Abbott =

Village in Dorset, England

Coordinates: 50.8027°N 2.7776°W

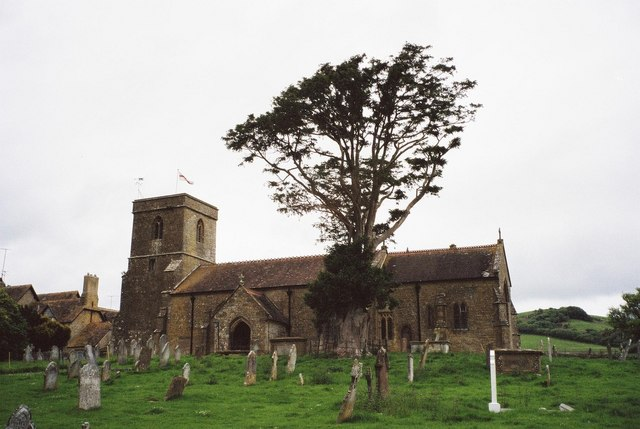
- Parish church of St Mary

- Location within Dorset
- Population: 190
- OS grid reference: ST453006
- Unitary authority: Dorset
- Ceremonial county: Dorset
- Region: South West
- Country: England
- Sovereign state: United Kingdom
- Post town: Beaminster
- Postcode district: DT8
- Police: Dorset
- Fire: Dorset and Wiltshire
- Ambulance: South Western
- UK Parliament: West Dorset

Stoke Abbott is a village and civil parish in west Dorset, England, 2 miles (3.2 km) west of Beaminster. In 2013 the estimated population of the parish was 190.

The author Ralph Wightman, agriculturist, broadcaster, and native of Dorset, described the village as "a beautiful place of deep lanes, orchards and old houses, with a church of quiet charm", and, in a similar vein, Sir Frederick Treves in 1906 considered it "as pretty a village as any in Dorset".

On Waddon Hill to the northwest of the village are the remains of earthworks of an Iron Age settlement, consisting of a low bank 9 metres (30 ft) wide and traces of a ditch, replaced in AD 50 to AD60 by a short lived Roman Fort, though historic quarrying around the hill has destroyed much of the fort. Mid-1st-century Roman and Romano-British military artefacts were found on the hill's southern slopes in 1876–1878, and in Graham Webster's 1960's excavations. Roman artefacts from Chartknolle, a flat area further east, are on display in the village hall, along with a replica of a gold durotrigian stater. In the Domesday Book in 1086 the village was recorded as Stoche and had 32 households.

The parish church of St Mary the Virgin has Norman origins but has been altered and added to over the centuries. The 12th-century font is notable. The poet William Crowe was rector here between 1782 and 1786; at the end of his incumbency he published his most well known piece, Lewesdon Hill, about the hill to the west of the village. The Very Rev Hedley Robert Burrows (1887–1983), who later became Archdeacon of Winchester and then Dean of Hereford, was incumbent at Stoke Abbott for a time.

== Politics ==
In the UK national parliament, Stoke Abbott is within the West Dorset parliamentary constituency.

After 2019 structural changes to local government in England, Stoke Abbott is part of the Marshwood Vale ward which elects 1 member to Dorset Council.
