= Dorchester Poundbury (ward) =

Electoral ward in Dorset, England

- ward Dorset Council
- Population: 4,067
- Major settlements: Poundbury

Current ward
- Created: 2019
- Councillor: Richard Biggs (Liberal Democrats)
- Number of councillors: 1

Dorchester Poundbury is an electoral ward in Dorset. Since 2019, the ward has elected 1 councillor to Dorset Council.

== Geography ==
The Dorchester Poundbury ward covers the Poundbury area of Dorchester.

== Councillors ==
Election	Councillors
2019	Richard Biggs (Liberal Democrats)
2024	Richard Biggs (Liberal Democrats)

== Election ==
=== 2019 Dorset Council election ===
2019 Dorset Council election: Dorchester Poundbury (1 seat)
Party	Candidate	Votes	%	±%
Liberal Democrats	Richard Biggs	457	35.9	
Conservative	Peter Jonathon Stein	415	32.6	
Independent	William Gibbons	273	21.4	
Green	Tim Oram	73	5.7	
Labour	Sinead McCarney	55	4.3	
Majority				
Turnout			46.20	
Liberal Democrats win (new seat)				

=== 2024 Dorset Council election ===
2024 Dorset Council election: Dorchester Poundbury (1 seat)
Party	Candidate	Votes	%	±%
Liberal Democrats	Richard Martin Biggs*	780	54.0	+18.1
Conservative	Peter Jonathon Stein	449	31.1	−1.5
Labour	Nick Boothroyd	122	8.4	+4.1
Green	Len Herbert	93	6.4	+0.7
Turnout		1,444	41.38	
Liberal Democrats hold		Swing		

== See also ==
- List of electoral wards in Dorset
