= Crossways (ward) =

Electoral ward in Dorset, England

- ward Dorset Council
- Population: 3,787
- Major settlements: Crossways

Current ward
- Created: 2019
- Councillor: Nick Ireland (Liberal Democrats)
- Number of councillors: 1

Crossways is an electoral ward in Dorset. Since 2019, the ward has elected 1 councillor to Dorset Council.

== History ==
Crossways is represented by Nick Ireland who is the Liberal Democrat group leader on Dorset Council. He was the unsuccessful parliamentary candidate in South Dorset at the 2019 general election.

== Geography ==
The Crossways ward is rural and is composed of the civil parishes of Crossways, Osmington, Owermoigne, Poxwell and Warmwell.

== Councillors ==
Election	Councillors
2019	Nick Ireland (Liberal Democrats)
2024	Nick Ireland (Liberal Democrats)

== Election ==
=== 2019 Dorset Council election ===
2019 Dorset Council election: Crossways (1 seat)
Party	Candidate	Votes	%	±%
Liberal Democrats	Nick Ireland	746	62.3	
Conservative	Barry Michael Quinn	360	30.1	
Labour	Mollie Joy Collins	91	7.6	
Majority				
Turnout			40.70	
Liberal Democrats win (new seat)				

=== 2024 Dorset Council election ===
2024 Dorset Council election: Crossways (1 seat)
Party	Candidate	Votes	%	±%
Liberal Democrats	Nick Ireland*	636	57.3	−5.0
Conservative	Andrew Ross-Skinner	361	32.5	+2.4
Labour	Jim Draper	113	10.2	+2.6
Turnout		1,110	37.4	
Liberal Democrats hold		Swing		

== See also ==
- List of electoral wards in Dorset
