= Broadwey =

Village in Dorset, England

Coordinates: 50°39′N 2°28′W

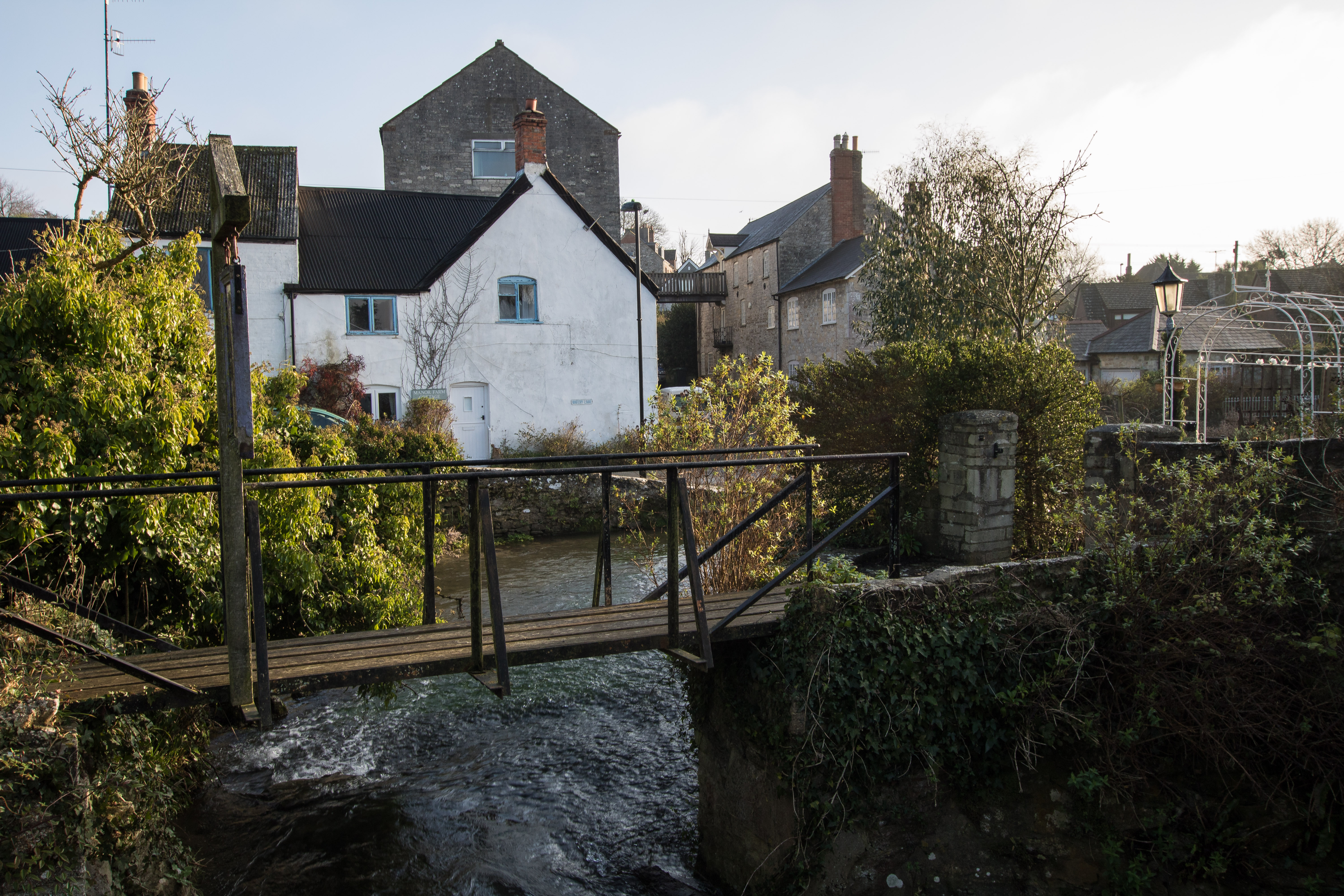
- The River Wey in Broadwey

- Location within Dorset
- Civil parish: Weymouth
- Unitary authority: Dorset
- Ceremonial county: Dorset
- Region: South West
- Country: England
- Sovereign state: United Kingdom
- Post town: Weymouth
- Postcode district: DT3
- Dialling code: 01305

Broadwey /ˈbrɔːdweɪ/ was a former village in the northern suburbs of Weymouth, Dorset, England. It lies on the B3159 road. In 2001, Broadwey and Upwey ward had a population of 4,349. St Nicholas' Church serves the suburb, as did Broadwey Methodist Church until 2021.

== Politics ==
Broadwey is part of the South Dorset parliamentary constituency.

Broadwey is part of the Upwey and Broadwey ward for elections to Dorset Council.

In 1931 the civil parish called "Broadway" had a population of 960. On 1 April 1933 the parish was abolished and merged with Weymouth and Bincombe.
