= Bincombe =

Hamlet and civil parish in Dorset, England

Coordinates: 50.6603°N 2.4459°W

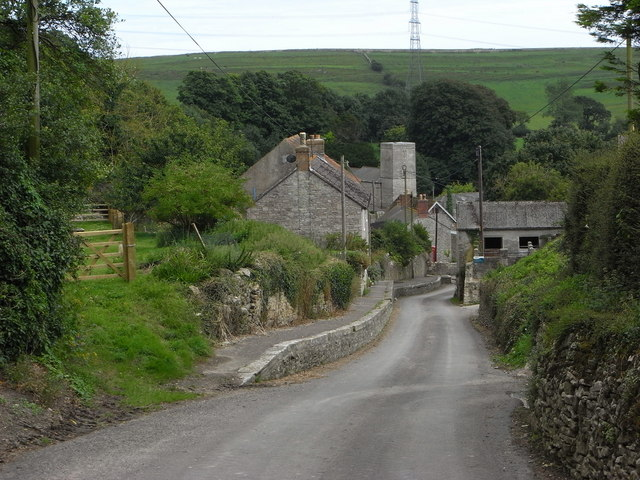
- View along the main road in Bincombe with the church in the background.

- Location within Dorset
- Population: 514
- OS grid reference: SY685846
- Civil parish: Bincombe
- Unitary authority: Dorset
- Ceremonial county: Dorset
- Region: South West
- Country: England
- Sovereign state: United Kingdom
- Post town: WEYMOUTH
- Postcode district: DT3
- Dialling code: 01305
- Police: Dorset
- Fire: Dorset and Wiltshire
- Ambulance: South Western
- UK Parliament: West Dorset
- Website: www.bincombe.co.uk

Bincombe is a small village, or hamlet, and civil parish in Dorset, England, 5 miles (8.0 km) north of Weymouth. The village is 1 mile (1.6 km) from Upwey railway station and 28 miles (45 km) from Bournemouth Airport. The main road running through the village is Icen Lane. The civil parish, which includes a small part of the settlement of Broadwey to the west, had a population of 514 in the 2011 census.

The village stands on a limestone ridge 3 miles (5 km) south of Dorchester. Holy Trinity Church dates from the early 13th century.

Large military camps for the observation of the English Channel were formed on the hills in this parish in the reign of George III, and two deserters, in trying to escape with details of the different camps, were captured in the English Channel, tried by court martial and shot on Bincombe Down. Their remains are buried in the churchyard, where the stone can still be seen. The same incident, differently interpreted, forms the basis of Thomas Hardy's short story, The Melancholy Hussar of the German Legion.

The Master and Fellows of Caius College, Cambridge, are the principal landowners.
