= Independents for Dorset =

British political party

- Abbreviation: IfD
- Leader: Les Fry
- Founded: February 28, 2024; 13 months ago
- Preceded by: Alliance for Local Living
- Headquarters: Dorchester, Dorset
- Ideology: Localism; Non-partisan politics
- Dorset Council: 3 / 76

Website
- www.dorset-independents.uk

Independents for Dorset is a local political party based in Dorset, England.

== History ==
The group was founded succeeding the Alliance for Local Living. It was originally known as "All for Dorset" and was inspired by the teal independents in Australia. Independents for Dorset had 4 councillors until May 2024.

Independents for Dorset won three seats in the 2024 Dorset Council election.

Name	Ward
Pete Roper	Portland
Rob Hughes	Portland
Les Fry	Dorchester West

They won nine of the 14 seats on Portland Town Council.

== See also ==
- Alliance for Local Living
- Christchurch Independents
- Poole People Party
- Poole Engage Party
