= Dorset Council (UK) =

Local authority in England

- Coat of arms of Dorset Council

Type
- Type: Unitary authority

History
- Founded: 1 April 2019
- Preceded by: Weymouth and Portland; West Dorset; North Dorset; Purbeck; East Dorset; Dorset County Council

Leadership
- Chair: Stella Jones, Liberal Democrats since 15 May 2025
- Leader: Nick Ireland, Liberal Democrats since 16 May 2024
- Chief Executive: Catherine Howe since 4 August 2025

Structure
- Seats: 82 councillors
- Political groups: Administration (46) Liberal Democrats (42) Green (4) Other parties (36) Conservative (30) Ind. for Dorset (2) Labour (2) Independent (1)

Elections
- Voting system: First past the post
- Last election: 2 May 2024
- Next election: May 2029

Meeting place
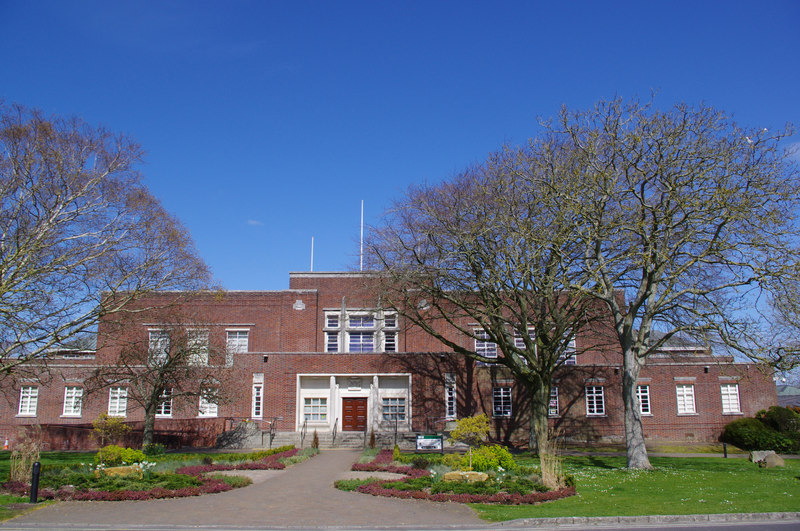
- County Hall, Colliton Park, Dorchester, DT1 1XJ

Website
- www.dorsetcouncil.gov.uk

Dorset Council is the local authority for the non-metropolitan county of Dorset in England. It is a unitary authority, being a district council which also performs the functions of a county council. The non-metropolitan county is smaller than the ceremonial county of Dorset, which also includes Bournemouth, Christchurch and Poole. The council was created in 2019 when local government across Dorset was reorganised.

The council has been under Liberal Democrat majority control since the 2024 election. It is based at County Hall in Dorchester.

== History ==
Prior to 2019, the non-metropolitan county of Dorset had a two-tier structure of local government, with Dorset County Council serving as the upper-tier authority, and the six district councils of Christchurch, East Dorset, North Dorset, Purbeck, West Dorset, and Weymouth and Portland serving as lower-tier authorities. The boroughs of Bournemouth and Poole had both been removed from the non-metropolitan county in 1997 to become unitary authorities, but remained part of the ceremonial county.

Following consultation on proposals described as 'Future Dorset', which concluded in 2018, local government across the whole ceremonial county of Dorset was reorganised with effect from 1 April 2019. The nine previous councils (Dorset County Council, the six lower-tier district councils and the two unitary authorities of Bournemouth and Poole) were all abolished. They were replaced by two unitary authorities: Dorset Council and Bournemouth, Christchurch and Poole Council.

The way the changes were implemented was to redefine the non-metropolitan county of Dorset to remove the borough of Christchurch, which was merged with Bournemouth and Poole to create Bournemouth, Christchurch and Poole. The redefined non-metropolitan county therefore covered the combined area of the former districts of East Dorset, North Dorset, Purbeck, West Dorset, and Weymouth and Portland. A non-metropolitan district of Dorset was created matching the new version of the non-metropolitan county. Dorset Council is legally the district council, and there is no separate county council; the district council also performs county council functions, making it a unitary authority.

A shadow authority was established in May 2018 to oversee the transition, comprising all elected councillors from the five districts in the new Dorset Council area, plus all councillors on Dorset County Council except the five who represented divisions in Christchurch. Rebecca Knox, the Conservative leader of Dorset County Council, was appointed leader of the shadow authority.

The new district and council formally came into being on 1 April 2019, at which point the old councils were abolished. The shadow authority continued to run the council until the inaugural election in May 2019.

== Governance ==
As a unitary authority, the council provides both district-level and county-level services. The whole area is divided into civil parishes, which form an additional tier of local government.

=== Political control ===
Following the 2024 election, the Liberal Democrats had a two-seat majority on the council. They therefore could have formed a majority administration alone, but opted instead to form an administration with the Green Party.

Political control of the council since its formation in 2019 has been as follows:

Party in Control	Years
Conservative	2019–2024
Liberal Democrats	2024–present

=== Leadership ===
During the shadow period 2018–2019, Rebecca Knox, Conservative leader of the outgoing Dorset County Council, served as leader of the shadow authority. At the first formal meeting of the new Dorset Council after its first elections in 2019, Spencer Flower was appointed leader of the council. He had been the last leader of the former East Dorset District Council.

Councillor	Party	From	To
Spencer Flower	Conservative	16 May 2019	16 May 2024
Nick Ireland	Liberal Democrats	16 May 2024	

=== Composition ===
Following the 2024 election, the composition of the council was:

Party	Councillors
Liberal Democrats	42
Conservative	30
Green	4
Independents for Dorset	3
Labour	2
Independent	1
Total	82

The independent councillor sits in a group with the local party Independents for Dorset. The next election is due in May 2029.

== Elections ==
Since the first election in 2019 the council has comprised 82 councillors representing 52 wards, with each ward electing one, two or three councillors. As part of the reforms creating the new council, it was specified that the first two elections in 2019 and 2024 should each be for a five year term of office, reverting to the normal four year terms used by other English local authorities from 2029 onwards.

== Premises ==
The council has its headquarters at County Hall at Colliton Park in Dorchester, which was completed for Dorset County Council in 1955.

== Cabinet ==
On 14 May 2024, the new cabinet was announced, including Green Party councillor from Rodwell and Wyke, Clare Sutton. 'Lead councillors' (deputy portfolio holders) were scrapped to save money. Four councillors representing wards in Weymouth were appointed, which was significant as the previous Conservative cabinet had no members from Weymouth, despite it being the largest town in the council's area.

Councillor	Party	Portfolio	Ward
Nick Ireland	Liberal Democrats	Council leader, performance, communications, the environment, climate change and safeguarding	Crossways
Richard Biggs	Liberal Democrats	Deputy leader portfolio holder for property and assets, economic growth and levelling up, Dorchester councillor	Dorchester Poundbury
Simon Clifford	Liberal Democrats	Finance, corporate assets and strategy	Chickerell
Ben Wilson	Liberal Democrats	Corporate development, transformation, digital and change	South East Purbeck
Jon Andrews	Liberal Democrats	Commissioned services, highways, waste and travel	Sherborne East
Steve Robinson	Liberal Democrats	Adult social services	Lytchett Matravers and Upton
Gill Taylor	Liberal Democrats	Public health, environmental health and housing	Chickerell
Shane Bartlett	Liberal Democrats	Emergency planning	Wimborne Minster
Ryan Hope	Liberal Democrats	Customer, culture and community engagement	Westham
Clare Sutton	Green Party	Children’s services, education and skills	Rodwell and Wyke

Other posts, including council chair, committee chairs and vice-chairs were elected at the council’s annual meeting in Dorchester on 16 May 2024.

Committee chairs:

- People & Health Overview Committee – Cllr Beryl Ezzard
- People & Health Scrutiny Committee – Cllr Toni Coombs
- Place & Resources Overview Committee – Cllr Andy Canning
- Place & Resources Scrutiny Committee – Cllr Noc Lacey-Clarke
- Audit & Governance Committee – Cllr Gary Suttle
- Appeals Committee – Cllr Andrew Starr
- Harbours Advisory Committee – Cllr Rob Hughes
- Licensing Committee – Cllr Derek Beer
- Strategic & Technical Planning Committee – Cllr Duncan Sowry-House
- Northern Area Planning Committee – Cllr Richard Crabb
- Eastern Area Planning Committee – Cllr David Tooke
- Western Area Planning Committee – Cllr Dave Bolwell
- Pension Fund Committee – Cllr Andy Canning

== See also ==
- 2019 structural changes to local government in England
