= 2022 Somerset Council election =

2022 local election in Somerset

- 5 May 2022

All 110 seats of Somerset Council 56 seats needed for a majority
	First party	Second party	Third party
Leader	Bill Revans	David Fothergill
Party	Liberal Democrats	Conservative	Green
Last election	12 seats, 31.4%	35 seats, 47.0%	2 seats, 4.7%
Seats won	61	36	5
Seat change	▲49	▲1	▲3
Popular vote	132,830	113,054	26,353
Percentage	43.6%	37.1%	8.7%
	Fourth party	Fifth party
Leader	Leigh Redman
Party	Labour	Independent
Last election	3 seats, 9.3%	3 seats, 4.7%
Seats won	5	3
Seat change	▲2	Steady
Popular vote	17,840	12,002
Percentage	5.9%	3.9%
- 2022 Somerset County Council Election Results Map
Council control before election
Conservative
Subsequent council control
Liberal Democrats

The 2022 Somerset Council election took place on 5 May 2022 to elect members of Somerset County Council. The number of councillors was doubled from 55 to 110 at this election, in preparation for the county council becoming a unitary authority on 1 April 2023, when it was renamed Somerset Council.

The election coincided with other local elections across the United Kingdom. The county council election was initially due to take place on 6 May 2021, but Robert Jenrick extended the terms of sitting councillors for a year pending a decision as to which unitarisation scheme would be taken forward: the county council had advocated the eventually successful proposal for a single unitary authority, while the district councils supported introducing two unitary councils.

== Background ==
The Conservative governments of Theresa May and Boris Johnson undertook structural changes to local government in England that resulted in several county councils and their district councils being replaced by unitary authorities. Somerset County Council first made plans for unitarisation in 2018. The county council proposed a single unitary authority that would encompass all the districts, while the district councils proposed two unitary authorities representing the east and the west of the county. Robert Jenrick, the minister responsible, approved the plan for a single council.

Before the election, the Somerset County Council was led by a Conservative Party majority.

== Election results ==
The Liberal Democrats won 61 of the 110 seats, giving them an overall majority, taking control of the county council from May 2022 and of the new unitary authority from April 2023.

Somerset Council election, 2022
Party	Candidates						Votes		
Party	Stood	Elected	Gained	Unseated	Net	% of total	%	No.	Net %
Liberal Democrats	108	61	–	–	–	55.5%	43.6%	132,830	N/A
Conservative	109	36	–	–	–	32.7%	37.1%	113,054	N/A
Green	49	5	–	–	–	4.5%	8.7%	26,353	N/A
Labour	45	5	–	–	–	4.5%	5.9%	17,840	N/A
Independent	21	3	–	–	–	2.7%	3.9%	12,002	N/A
ifF	2	0	–	–	–	0%	0.5%	1,600	N/A
For Britain	1	0	–	–	–	0%	0.1%	171	N/A
Freedom Alliance	1	0	–	–	–	0%	0.0%	117	N/A
UKIP	1	0	–	–	–	0%	0.0%	97	N/A

== Results by division ==
Sitting district councillors are shown with *, sitting county councillors are shown with †.

=== Bishops Hull & Taunton West ===
Bishops Hull & Taunton West
Party	Candidate	Votes	%	±%
Independent	John Hunt*†	1,835	53.6	N/A
Liberal Democrats	Caroline Jane Ellis*	1,646	48.1	N/A
Conservative	Peter James Prior-Sankey	813	23.7	N/A
Liberal Democrats	Rosemary Esther Sabel	799	23.3	N/A
Green	Alan William Debenham	379	11.1	N/A
Labour	Matthew William Rhys Ravenhill	249	7.3	N/A
Turnout		3,424		
Registered electors		7,928		
Independent win (new seat)				
Liberal Democrats win (new seat)				

=== Blackdown & Neroche ===
Blackdown & Neroche
Party	Candidate	Votes	%	±%
Liberal Democrats	Ross Longhurst Henley*	1,891	54.0	N/A
Liberal Democrats	Sarah Anne Wakefield*	1,701	48.6	N/A
Conservative	John Bryan Thorne†	1,256	35.9	N/A
Conservative	Michael Stanley Albert Dennis	1,191	34.0	N/A
Independent	Janet Carol Lloyd	303	8.6	N/A
Independent	Sue Buller	276	7.9	N/A
Turnout		3,503		
Registered electors		8,598		
Liberal Democrats win (new seat)				
Liberal Democrats win (new seat)				

=== Blackmoor Vale ===
Blackmoor Vale
Party	Candidate	Votes	%	±%
Liberal Democrats	Sarah Joanne Dyke*	1,814	57.0	N/A
Liberal Democrats	Nicola Clark*	1,590	50.0	N/A
Conservative	Hayward Burt*	1,443	45.4	N/A
Conservative	William Wallace*†	1,328	41.7	N/A
Turnout		3,181		
Registered electors		7,338		
Liberal Democrats win (new seat)				
Liberal Democrats win (new seat)				

=== Brent ===
Brent
Party	Candidate	Votes	%	±%
Conservative	Bob Filmer*†	1,718	57.4	N/A
Conservative	Tony Grimes*	1,475	49.3	N/A
Liberal Democrats	Gregory Andrew Broadhurst	1,254	41.9	N/A
Liberal Democrats	Jamie Scanlon	1,179	39.4	N/A
Turnout		2,994		
Registered electors		7,966		
Conservative win (new seat)				
Conservative win (new seat)				

=== Bridgwater East & Bawdrip ===
Bridgwater East & Bawdrip
Party	Candidate	Votes	%	±%
Conservative	Diogo Rodrigues*	1,188	49.6	N/A
Conservative	Andy Dingwall	1,099	45.9	N/A
Labour	David Peter Loveridge†	549	22.9	N/A
Labour	Tony Heywood*	537	22.4	N/A
Liberal Democrats	Sarah Baker	508	21.2	N/A
Liberal Democrats	Lorna King	422	17.6	N/A
Green	Allan James Jeffrey	203	8.5	N/A
Turnout		2,396		
Registered electors		9,083		
Conservative win (new seat)				
Conservative win (new seat)				

=== Bridgwater North & Central ===
Bridgwater North & Central
Party	Candidate	Votes	%	±%
Labour	Leigh Redman*†	589	46.4	N/A
Labour	Hilary Joan Bruce*	511	40.3	N/A
Conservative	Pelè James Barnes	403	31.8	N/A
Conservative	Christine Henrietta Ellen Rogers	357	28.1	N/A
Liberal Democrats	Adrian Nickolls	254	20.0	N/A
Liberal Democrats	Anthony Nickolls	226	17.8	N/A
Turnout		1,269		
Registered electors		6,973		
Labour win (new seat)				
Labour win (new seat)				

=== Bridgwater South ===
Bridgwater South
Party	Candidate	Votes	%	±%
Labour	Kathy Pearce*	804	52.2	N/A
Labour	Brian David Smedley*	768	49.9	N/A
Conservative	Matthew Paul Fermor	508	33.0	N/A
Conservative	Klaus Detlef Galeitzke	440	28.6	N/A
Liberal Democrats	Phil Stone	201	13.1	N/A
Liberal Democrats	Theo Jupp	199	12.9	N/A
Turnout		1,540		
Registered electors		7,743		
Labour win (new seat)				
Labour win (new seat)				

=== Bridgwater West ===
Bridgwater West
Party	Candidate	Votes	%	±%
Conservative	Gill Slocombe*	1,040	49.9	N/A
Conservative	Lance John Duddridge*	956	45.9	N/A
Labour	Tim Mander	661	31.7	N/A
Labour	Mick Lerry	590	28.3	N/A
Liberal Democrats	Dean Waghorn	395	19.0	N/A
Liberal Democrats	Taz Haysham	304	14.6	N/A
Turnout		2,083		
Registered electors		7,930		
Conservative win (new seat)				
Conservative win (new seat)				

=== Brympton ===
Brympton
Party	Candidate	Votes	%	±%
Liberal Democrats	Peter Jeremy Seib*	920	60.2	N/A
Liberal Democrats	Jeny Snell*	905		
Conservative	Anthony Power	609	39.8	N/A
Conservative	Teresa Thomas	512		
Turnout				
Registered electors		6,943		
Liberal Democrats win (new seat)				
Liberal Democrats win (new seat)				

=== Burnham on Sea North ===
Burnham on Sea North
Party	Candidate	Votes	%	±%
Liberal Democrats	Mike Murphy*	1,597	54.8	N/A
Conservative	Peter Laurence Clayton*†	1,384	47.5	N/A
Liberal Democrats	Tony Sutcliffe	1,288	44.2	N/A
Conservative	Kathy Jones	1,269	43.6	N/A
Turnout		2,912		
Registered electors		8,010		
Liberal Democrats win (new seat)				
Conservative win (new seat)				

=== Cannington ===
Cannington
Party	Candidate	Votes	%	±%
Conservative	Mike Caswell*†	1,271	44.2	N/A
Conservative	Brian James Bolt*	1,234	42.9	N/A
Liberal Democrats	Stephen James Darch	1,000	34.8	N/A
Liberal Democrats	Jane Victoria Sutton	967	33.6	N/A
Labour	Siobhan Wilson	390	13.6	N/A
Labour	Philip St Lawrence King	336	11.7	N/A
Green	Malcolm John Critchley	314	10.9	N/A
Turnout		2,874		
Registered electors		7,400		
Conservative win (new seat)				
Conservative win (new seat)				

=== Castle Cary ===
Castle Cary
Party	Candidate	Votes	%	±%
Liberal Democrats	Henry Hobhouse*	1,618	48.8	N/A
Conservative	Mike Lewis*†	1,556	46.9	N/A
Conservative	Howard Alan Butterfield	1,333	40.2	N/A
Liberal Democrats	Stephen Richard John Page	1,231	37.1	N/A
Green	Peter Martin Ebsworth	469	14.1	N/A
Turnout		3,315		
Registered electors		8,038		
Liberal Democrats win (new seat)				
Conservative win (new seat)				

=== Chard North ===
Chard North
Party	Candidate	Votes	%	±%
Liberal Democrats	Jenny Kenton*	1,162	39.9	N/A
Conservative	Martin John Wale*	1,041	35.8	N/A
Liberal Democrats	Martin John Carnell*	972	33.4	N/A
Conservative	Kate Wylie Carrick	829	28.5	N/A
Green	Serena Angela Wootton	693	23.8	N/A
Green	Jason Charles Hawkes	681	23.4	N/A
Labour	John Wardman Schofield	110	3.8	N/A
Turnout		2,910		
Registered electors		8,042		
Liberal Democrats win (new seat)				
Conservative win (new seat)				

=== Chard South ===
Chard South
Party	Candidate	Votes	%	±%
Liberal Democrats	Jason Paul Baker*	928	35.8	N/A
Conservative	Connor Anthony Payne	903	34.9	N/A
Liberal Democrats	Claire Ann Brown	818	31.6	N/A
Green	Timothy Michael Eggins	813	31.4	N/A
Conservative	Stuart James Bull	748	28.9	N/A
Green	Adam Harold Loveridge	479	18.5	N/A
For Britain	Nigel Charles Pearson	171	6.6	N/A
Turnout		2,589		
Registered electors		6,657		
Liberal Democrats win (new seat)				
Conservative win (new seat)				

=== Cheddar ===
Cheddar
Party	Candidate	Votes	%	±%
Liberal Democrats	Pauline Ann Ham	1,300	45.6	N/A
Liberal Democrats	Ben Ferguson	1,185	41.5	N/A
Conservative	Jeff Savage	1,151	40.3	N/A
Conservative	Graham Roger Godwin-Pearson*	1,106	38.8	N/A
Green	Stewart Frances Conning	325	11.4	N/A
Labour	Joe Maggs	246	8.6	N/A
Green	Liz Barrett	242	8.5	N/A
Turnout		2,853		
Registered electors		7,202		
Liberal Democrats win (new seat)				
Liberal Democrats win (new seat)				

=== Coker ===
Coker
Party	Candidate	Votes	%	±%
Liberal Democrats	Oliver James Patrick	1,857	54.3	N/A
Liberal Democrats	Mike Hewitson*	1,856	54.3	N/A
Conservative	Robert Leonard David Janes	1,316	38.5	N/A
Conservative	Huw Rutherford Lawford	1,186	34.7	N/A
Labour	Jane Elizabeth Carter-Uren	243	7.1	N/A
Turnout		3,419		
Registered electors		7,533		
Liberal Democrats win (new seat)				
Liberal Democrats win (new seat)				

=== Comeytrowe & Trull ===
Comeytrowe & Trull
Party	Candidate	Votes	%	±%
Liberal Democrats	Habib Farbahi*	2,219	60.6	N/A
Liberal Democrats	Dawn Elaine Johnson*†	2,216	60.6	N/A
Conservative	Ruth Harmon	1,084	29.6	N/A
Conservative	Aimee Patricia Cheshire	912	24.9	N/A
Green	Julian Mellor	333	9.1	N/A
Labour	Jon Gray	199	5.4	N/A
Turnout		3,659		
Registered electors		7,908		
Liberal Democrats win (new seat)				
Liberal Democrats win (new seat)				

=== Crewkerne ===
Crewkerne
Party	Candidate	Votes	%	±%
Liberal Democrats	Mike Best*†	1,213	45.3	N/A
Conservative	Steve Ashton	1,069	39.9	N/A
Liberal Democrats	Paul Michael Maxwell*	906	33.8	N/A
Conservative	Pippa Reynolds	860	32.1	N/A
Green	Kate Limmer	480	17.9	N/A
Green	Noor Renee Limmer	283	10.6	N/A
Labour	John James Shirley	260	9.7	N/A
Turnout		2,680		
Registered electors		7,091		
Liberal Democrats win (new seat)				
Conservative win (new seat)				

=== Curry Rivel & Langport ===
Curry Rivel & Langport
Party	Candidate	Votes	%	±%
Liberal Democrats	Richard John Wilkins	1,711	43.0	N/A
Liberal Democrats	Mike Stanton*	1,634	41.1	N/A
Conservative	Claire Paul*†	1,519	38.2	N/A
Conservative	Jonathan Eric Lewis Munday	1,397	35.1	N/A
Green	Stephen Peter Tate	427	10.7	N/A
Labour	Sean Adam Drumgoole	352	8.8	N/A
Green	Matthew Francis Geen	254	6.4	N/A
Turnout		3,980		
Registered electors		8,735		
Liberal Democrats win (new seat)				
Liberal Democrats win (new seat)				

=== Dulverton & Exmoor ===
Dulverton & Exmoor
Party	Candidate	Votes	%	±%
Conservative	Steven John Pugsley*	2,157	66.4	N/A
Conservative	Frances Mary Nicholson†	2,072	63.8	N/A
Liberal Democrats	Scilla Barney	741	22.8	N/A
Liberal Democrats	Robert David Jones	735	22.6	N/A
Green	Julie Ann Mitchell	367	11.3	N/A
Labour	Graham Robert Kennedy	187	5.8	N/A
Turnout		3,250		
Registered electors		6,726		
Conservative win (new seat)				
Conservative win (new seat)				

=== Dunster ===
Dunster
Party	Candidate	Votes	%	±%
Conservative	Christine Mary Lawrence†	1,371	49.2	N/A
Liberal Democrats	Marcus Kravis*	1,332	47.8	N/A
Liberal Democrats	Stephen Dennis Griffiths*	1,305	46.8	N/A
Conservative	David John Mansfield	1,156	41.4	N/A
Green	Katri Hastings	334	12.0	N/A
Labour	Shanti Roos	198	7.1	N/A
Turnout		2,789		
Registered electors		7,097		
Conservative win (new seat)				
Liberal Democrats win (new seat)				

=== Frome East ===
Frome East
Party	Candidate	Votes	%	±%
Green	William Shane Collins*	1,171	36.7	N/A
Green	Helen Rachael Kay*	1,103	34.6	N/A
Liberal Democrats	Janine Louise Nash*	975	30.5	N/A
ifF	Scott Anthony Joseph Ward	975	30.5	N/A
Liberal Democrats	Alex Lawrence-Berkeley	837	26.2	N/A
Conservative	Eve Berry*	587	18.4	N/A
Conservative	Dan Wood	472	14.8	N/A
Turnout		3,192	34.3	
Registered electors		9,283		
Green win (new seat)				
Green win (new seat)				

=== Frome North ===
Frome North
Party	Candidate	Votes	%	±%
Liberal Democrats	Adam Owen Matthew Boyden*	1,437	44.2	N/A
Conservative	Dawn Adele Denton	1,004	30.9	N/A
Liberal Democrats	Christine Cockroft	955	29.4	N/A
Green	John Martin Clarke*†	794	24.4	N/A
Conservative	Dale Viven Spree	769	23.6	N/A
Green	Lollie Melton	637	19.6	N/A
ifF	Steve Tanner	625	19.2	N/A
Turnout		3,252	43.7	
Registered electors		7,447		
Liberal Democrats win (new seat)				
Conservative win (new seat)				

=== Frome West ===
Frome West
Party	Candidate	Votes	%	±%
Green	Martin John Dimery†	1,604	51.1	N/A
Green	Michael John Dunk*	1,306	41.6	N/A
Liberal Democrats	Richard Francis Pinnock*	1,139	36.3	N/A
Liberal Democrats	Damon John Hooton*	1,098	35.0	N/A
Conservative	Mike Rideout	441	14.0	N/A
Conservative	Hilary Anne Thomas	419	13.3	N/A
Labour	Byron Kingsley Taylor	225	7.2	N/A
Turnout		3,139	38.5	
Registered electors		8,161		
Green win (new seat)				
Green win (new seat)				

=== Glastonbury ===
Glastonbury
Party	Candidate	Votes	%	±%
Liberal Democrats	Nick Cottle*	1,244	42.2	N/A
Conservative	Susannah Hart	1,025	34.8	N/A
Green	Jon Cousins*	916	31.1	N/A
Conservative	Lillith Linda Christine Osborn	887	30.1	N/A
Liberal Democrats	Adam Sen	719	24.4	N/A
Green	Mike Smyth	676	22.9	N/A
No party description	Susannah Maria Clemence	173	5.9	N/A
Turnout		2,946	41.0	
Registered electors		7,227		
Liberal Democrats win (new seat)				
Conservative win (new seat)				

=== Highbridge & Burnham South ===
Highbridge & Burnham South
Party	Candidate	Votes	%	±%
Conservative	John Charles Cook-Woodman*†	857	42.2	N/A
Conservative	Alistair Frank Hendry*	804	39.5	N/A
Liberal Democrats	Ross Baker	730	35.9	N/A
Liberal Democrats	Lizzy Ayres	596	29.3	N/A
Independent	Roger Charles Keen	391	19.2	N/A
Labour	Ben Metcalfe	282	13.9	N/A
No party description	Neculai Lupu	83	4.1	N/A
Turnout		2,033		
Registered electors		7,477		
Conservative win (new seat)				
Conservative win (new seat)				

=== Huntspill ===
Huntspill
Party	Candidate	Votes	%	±%
Conservative	Mark Healey*†	1,289	52.5	N/A
Conservative	Suria Aujla	1,218	49.6	N/A
Liberal Democrats	Martin Dunton	708	28.9	N/A
Liberal Democrats	Christina Murray Baron	681	27.8	N/A
Labour	Alex Glassford*	338	13.8	N/A
Labour Co-op	Liz Leavy*	320	13.0	N/A
Turnout		2,454		
Registered electors		7,735		
Conservative win (new seat)				
Conservative win (new seat)				

=== Ilminster ===
Ilminster
Party	Candidate	Votes	%	±%
Conservative	Sue Osborne*	1,494	43.1	N/A
Liberal Democrats	Val Keitch*	1,397	40.3	N/A
Conservative	Jo Woodcock	1,392	40.1	N/A
Liberal Democrats	Ray Buckler*	1,384	39.9	N/A
Green	Roger Sydney Bradley	425	12.3	N/A
Green	Karin Cumming	342	9.9	N/A
Labour	Paul John Sellers	227	6.5	N/A
Turnout		3,468		
Registered electors		8,331		
Conservative win (new seat)				
Liberal Democrats win (new seat)				

=== King Alfred ===
King Alfred
Party	Candidate	Votes	%	±%
Liberal Democrats	Matthew Henry Martin*	1,709	47.0	N/A
Liberal Democrats	Harry James Munt	1,641	45.1	N/A
Conservative	David John Huxtable†	1,592	43.8	N/A
Conservative	Duncan McGinty*	1,423	39.1	N/A
Green	Charles Graham	526	14.5	N/A
Turnout		3,635		
Registered electors		8,127		
Liberal Democrats win (new seat)				
Liberal Democrats win (new seat)				

=== Lydeard ===
Lydeard
Party	Candidate	Votes	%	±%
Liberal Democrats	Mike Rigby*†	1,975	64.4	N/A
Liberal Democrats	Andy Sully*	1,557	50.8	N/A
Conservative	Steve Richards	972	31.7	N/A
Conservative	Paul Alistair Sayer	878	28.6	N/A
Green	Clive Martin	442	14.4	N/A
Turnout		3,067		
Registered electors		8,162		
Liberal Democrats win (new seat)				
Liberal Democrats win (new seat)				

=== Martock ===
Martock
Party	Candidate	Votes	%	±%
Liberal Democrats	John Allison Bailey	1,388	45.3	N/A
Liberal Democrats	Emily Jane Pearlstone	989	32.3	N/A
Conservative	Gemma Trudy Verdon*	975	31.8	N/A
Conservative	Stephen Bower	892	29.1	N/A
Independent	Neil Brian Bloomfield*†	775	25.3	N/A
Independent	Tony Capozzoli*	526	17.2	N/A
Labour	Gregory Chambers	222	7.2	N/A
Turnout		3,065		
Registered electors		8,442		
Liberal Democrats win (new seat)				
Liberal Democrats win (new seat)				

=== Mendip Central & East ===
Mendip Central & East
Party	Candidate	Votes	%	±%
Conservative	Philip John Ham*†	1,243	41.0	N/A
Conservative	Barry Michael Clarke	1,168	38.5	N/A
Liberal Democrats	Clare Hudson	1,117	36.8	N/A
Green	Matt Mellen	876	28.9	N/A
Liberal Democrats	Robert John Reed	806	26.6	N/A
Labour	Melanie Moulding	397	13.1	N/A
Turnout		3,033	40.8	
Registered electors		7,427		
Conservative win (new seat)				
Conservative win (new seat)				

=== Mendip Hills ===
Mendip Hills
Party	Candidate	Votes	%	±%
Liberal Democrats	Edric Wayland Hobbs*	1,450	48.6	N/A
Liberal Democrats	Tony Robbins	1,375	46.1	N/A
Conservative	David John Baker	1,254	42.0	N/A
Conservative	David Albert George Swain	1,080	36.2	N/A
Green	David Hine	513	17.2	N/A
Turnout		2,984	38.3	
Registered electors		7,830		
Liberal Democrats win (new seat)				
Liberal Democrats win (new seat)				

=== Mendip South ===
Mendip South
Party	Candidate	Votes	%	±%
Liberal Democrats	Claire Sully	1,781	52.4	N/A
Liberal Democrats	Alex Wiltshire	1,614	47.5	N/A
Conservative	John William Parham†	1,589	46.8	N/A
Conservative	Nigel Woollcombe-Adams*	1,458	42.9	N/A
Turnout		3,397	44.0	
Registered electors		7,771		
Liberal Democrats win (new seat)				
Liberal Democrats win (new seat)				

=== Mendip West ===
Mendip West
Party	Candidate	Votes	%	±%
Liberal Democrats	Ros Wyke*	2,232	62.7	N/A
Liberal Democrats	Heather Shearer*	2,124	59.7	N/A
Conservative	Mandy May Thomas-Atkin	1,195	33.6	N/A
Conservative	Stuart Arthur Kingham*	1,164	32.7	N/A
Turnout		3,560	44.1	
Registered electors		8,101		
Liberal Democrats win (new seat)				
Liberal Democrats win (new seat)				

=== Minehead ===
Minehead
Party	Candidate	Votes	%	±%
Conservative	Mandy Jayne Chilcott†	1,274	45.9	N/A
Conservative	Andy Hadley*	1,066	38.4	N/A
Liberal Democrats	Benet Allen*	809	29.2	N/A
Independent	Terry Venner*	800	28.8	N/A
Liberal Democrats	Jane Bowman Scott	719	25.9	N/A
Independent	Craig Frederick Palmer*	309	11.1	N/A
Labour	Liam Tucker	226	8.2	N/A
Turnout		2,773		
Registered electors		7,033		
Conservative win (new seat)				
Conservative win (new seat)				

=== Monkton & North Curry ===
Monkton & North Curry
Party	Candidate	Votes	%	±%
Conservative	David John Andrew Fothergill†	1,776	46.9	N/A
Conservative	Norman Philip Cavill*	1,698	44.8	N/A
Liberal Democrats	Ray Tully*	1,487	39.3	N/A
Liberal Democrats	Nick O'Donnell	1,407	37.2	N/A
Green	Andy Pritchard*	802	21.2	N/A
Turnout		3,786		
Registered electors		9,658		
Conservative win (new seat)				
Conservative win (new seat)				

=== North Petherton ===
North Petherton
Party	Candidate	Votes	%	±%
Liberal Democrats	Bill Revans*†	1,548	60.1	N/A
Conservative	Alan Sydney Ernest Bradford*	1,121	43.5	N/A
Liberal Democrats	Gary Wong*	1,084	42.1	N/A
Conservative	Anthony John Edward Betty*	801	31.1	N/A
Labour	Jon Falkingham	194	7.5	N/A
Labour	Genevieve Wark	183	7.1	N/A
Turnout		2,575		
Registered electors		7,468		
Liberal Democrats win (new seat)				
Conservative win (new seat)				

=== Rowbarton & Staplegrove ===
Rowbarton & Staplegrove
Party	Candidate	Votes	%	±%
Liberal Democrats	Dixie Claire Darch*	1,627	61.5	N/A
Liberal Democrats	Derek Aneurin Perry*	1,378	52.1	N/A
Conservative	Rod Williams†	880	33.3	N/A
Conservative	Greg Garner	783	29.6	N/A
Labour	Libby Lisgo*	367	13.9	N/A
Turnout		2,646		
Registered electors		7,399		
Liberal Democrats win (new seat)				
Liberal Democrats win (new seat)				

=== Shepton Mallet ===
Shepton Mallet
Party	Candidate	Votes	%	±%
Liberal Democrats	Martin Lovell	1,196	44.4	N/A
Conservative	Bente Olsen Height*	950	35.3	N/A
Liberal Democrats	Warren Garfield Kennedy*	930	34.5	N/A
Conservative	Simon Paul Davies	823	30.6	N/A
Independent	Abi McGuire	780	29.0	N/A
Labour	Chloe Adduocchio	282	10.5	N/A
Green	Victoria Kate Welsh	201	7.5	N/A
Green	Gregor Henry Neeve	165	6.1	N/A
Turnout		2,692	32.4	
Registered electors		8,331		
Liberal Democrats win (new seat)				
Conservative win (new seat)				

=== Somerton ===
Somerton
Party	Candidate	Votes	%	±%
Liberal Democrats	Dean Douglas Ruddle*†	1,906	52.9	N/A
Liberal Democrats	Tim Kerley*	1,761	48.8	N/A
Conservative	David Hall†	1,436	39.8	N/A
Conservative	Lucy Wallace	1,205	33.4	N/A
Labour	Keith Laurence O'Boyle	288	8.0	N/A
UKIP	Peter Kevin Richardson	97	2.7	N/A
Turnout		3,606		
Registered electors		8,324		
Liberal Democrats win (new seat)				
Liberal Democrats win (new seat)				

=== South Petherton & Islemoor ===
South Petherton & Islemoor
Party	Candidate	Votes	%	±%
Liberal Democrats	Adam James Dance*†	3,061	71.1	N/A
Liberal Democrats	Jo Roundell Greene	2,496	58.0	N/A
Conservative	Stephen Barry Carp	1,121	26.0	N/A
Conservative	Derek Normal Lander Yeomans	902	21.0	N/A
Green	Colin John Comben	320	7.4	N/A
Green	Michael Bernard Fox	210	4.9	N/A
Labour	Sarah Louise Setter	119	2.8	N/A
Turnout		4,305		
Registered electors		8,531		
Liberal Democrats win (new seat)				
Liberal Democrats win (new seat)				

=== Street ===
Street
Party	Candidate	Votes	%	±%
Liberal Democrats	Liz Leyshon*†	1,896	62.3	N/A
Liberal Democrats	Simon Michael Carswell*	1,661	54.6	N/A
Conservative	Terry William Edwin Napper*†	1,219	40.1	N/A
Conservative	Bryan Albert Beha	931	30.6	N/A
Turnout		3,041	33.7	
Registered electors		9,054		
Liberal Democrats win (new seat)				
Liberal Democrats win (new seat)				

=== Taunton East ===
Taunton East
Party	Candidate	Votes	%	±%
Liberal Democrats	Simon Coles*†	1,190	56.3	N/A
Liberal Democrats	Federica Roberta Diana Smith-Roberts*	1,183	56.0	N/A
Conservative	Henry William Haslam	549	26.0	N/A
Conservative	Tom Linnell	506	23.9	N/A
Green	Chris Salter	301	14.2	N/A
Labour	Stanley Joseph Ely	266	12.6	N/A
Turnout		2,114		
Registered electors		8,008		
Liberal Democrats win (new seat)				
Liberal Democrats win (new seat)				

=== Taunton North ===
Taunton North
Party	Candidate	Votes	%	±%
Liberal Democrats	Lee Baker*	1,073	45.0	N/A
Liberal Democrats	Tom Deakin*	1,072	44.9	N/A
Conservative	Giuseppe Leslie Fraschini†	817	34.2	N/A
Conservative	Jason Wayne Woollacott	730	30.6	N/A
Labour Co-op	Brenda Dawn Weston*	498	20.9	N/A
Labour Co-op	Rowan Thorne	438	18.3	N/A
Turnout		2,387		
Registered electors		7,628		
Liberal Democrats win (new seat)				
Liberal Democrats win (new seat)				

=== Taunton South ===
Taunton South
Party	Candidate	Votes	%	±%
Liberal Democrats	Hazel Ruth Prior-Sankey*†	1,945	68.8	N/A
Liberal Democrats	Fran Smith*	1,613	57.1	N/A
Conservative	Jean Margaret Allgrove	691	24.5	N/A
Conservative	Joanna Jane Lewin-Harris	608	21.5	N/A
Green	Fran Hicks	336	11.9	N/A
Labour Co-op	Ross Leach	208	7.4	N/A
Turnout		2,825		
Registered electors		8,335		
Liberal Democrats win (new seat)				
Liberal Democrats win (new seat)				

=== Upper Tone ===
Upper Tone
Party	Candidate	Votes	%	±%
Green	Dave Mansell*	1,687	49.7	N/A
Independent	Gwil Wren*	1,487	43.8	N/A
Conservative	Roger Keith Habgood*	1,158	34.1	N/A
Conservative	James Alexander Hunt†	1,082	31.9	N/A
Liberal Democrats	John Roskruge Hassall*	641	18.9	N/A
Labour	Michael Charles McGuffie	267	7.9	N/A
No party description	Phillip Robert Thorne	137	4.0	N/A
Turnout		3,392		
Registered electors		7,625		
Green win (new seat)				
Independent win (new seat)				

=== Watchet & Stogursey ===
Watchet & Stogursey
Party	Candidate	Votes	%	±%
Independent	Hugh John William Davies*†	890	29.6	N/A
Conservative	Rosemary Woods	841	28.0	N/A
Independent	Edward Martin	782	26.0	N/A
Conservative	Craig James Coleman	633	21.1	N/A
Independent	Loretta Anne Whetlor*	595	19.8	N/A
Independent	Ian Charles Aldridge*	521	17.3	N/A
Labour Co-op	Lucy Naylor	459	15.3	N/A
Liberal Democrats	Jill Ann Dillamore	296	9.9	N/A
Independent	Chris Morgan*	288	9.6	N/A
Liberal Democrats	Andy Kingston-James	237	7.9	N/A
No party description	Guy Denton	69	2.3	N/A
Turnout		3,004		
Registered electors		7,736		
Independent win (new seat)				
Conservative win (new seat)				

=== Wellington ===
Wellington
Party	Candidate	Votes	%	±%
Labour	Andrew James Govier*†	1,809	50.6	N/A
Conservative	Marcus Trevor Barr*	1,241	34.7	N/A
Liberal Democrats	Mark Raymond Lithgow*	1,226	34.3	N/A
Labour	Catherine Elizabeth Govier	1,046	29.3	N/A
Conservative	Zoe Alex Barr	966	27.0	N/A
Green	John Ainsworth	521	14.6	N/A
Turnout		3,572		
Registered electors		9,712		
Labour win (new seat)				
Conservative win (new seat)				

=== Wells ===
Wells
Party	Candidate	Votes	%	±%
Liberal Democrats	Tessa Munt†	2,507	65.0	N/A
Liberal Democrats	Theo Butt Philip	2,047	53.1	N/A
Conservative	Harvey Siggs	1,013	26.3	N/A
Conservative	Richard James Austin Greenwell	953	24.7	N/A
Green	Amanda Victoria Jane Phillips	526	13.6	N/A
Green	David Paul Grace	353	9.1	N/A
Turnout		3,858	43.8	
Registered electors		8,860		
Liberal Democrats win (new seat)				
Liberal Democrats win (new seat)				

=== Wincanton & Bruton ===
Wincanton & Bruton
Party	Candidate	Votes	%	±%
Conservative	Tom Peter John Power	1,447	41.7	N/A
Conservative	Lucy Clare Trimnell*	1,232	35.5	N/A
Green	Ewan William George Jones	1,045	30.1	N/A
Liberal Democrats	Abigail Rebekah Baker	1,007	29.0	N/A
Independent	Robin Frederick Bastable*	778	22.4	N/A
Labour	Suzanna van Moyland	529	15.3	N/A
Liberal Democrats	Kate Alexandra Pettemerides	492	14.2	N/A
Turnout		3,468		
Registered electors		8,746		
Conservative win (new seat)				
Conservative win (new seat)				

=== Yeovil Central ===
Yeovil Central
Party	Candidate	Votes	%	±%
Liberal Democrats	Andy Kendall*†	1,098	54.1	N/A
Liberal Democrats	Dave Woan	874	43.1	N/A
Conservative	Tony Ash	575	28.4	N/A
Conservative	Bridge Mary Philomena Spender	484	23.9	N/A
Green	Alan John Flint	253	12.5	N/A
Labour	Martin Ronald Bailey	222	10.9	N/A
Green	Andrew John Newman Simkins	151	7.4	N/A
Freedom Alliance	Stephen Robert Hawker	117	5.8	N/A
Turnout		2,028		
Registered electors		7,281		
Liberal Democrats win (new seat)				
Liberal Democrats win (new seat)				

=== Yeovil East ===
Yeovil East
Party	Candidate	Votes	%	±%
Liberal Democrats	Tony Lock*†	1,056	55.6	N/A
Liberal Democrats	Graham John Oakes*	983	51.8	N/A
Conservative	Claire Louise Thorne	458	24.1	N/A
Conservative	Teresa Anne Bond	420	22.1	N/A
Labour	Mary Lister Ashby	334	17.6	N/A
Green	Karen Ann Stutz	284	15.0	N/A
Turnout		1,899		
Registered electors		8,115		
Liberal Democrats win (new seat)				
Liberal Democrats win (new seat)				

=== Yeovil South ===
Yeovil South
Party	Candidate	Votes	%	±%
Conservative	Faye Marie Purbrick†	920	34.5	N/A
Liberal Democrats	Andy Soughton*	917	34.4	N/A
Liberal Democrats	Karl William Gill*	905	33.9	N/A
Conservative	Trisha Lawford	860	32.3	N/A
Independent	Tareth William Casey	666	25.0	N/A
Green	Mark Edwards	354	13.3	N/A
Labour	Terry Ledlie	315	11.8	N/A
Turnout		2,666		
Registered electors		7,885		
Conservative win (new seat)				
Liberal Democrats win (new seat)				

=== Yeovil West ===
Yeovil West
Party	Candidate	Votes	%	±%
Liberal Democrats	Evie Potts-Jones	944	53.5	N/A
Liberal Democrats	Wes Read*	901	51.0	N/A
Conservative	Graham Pritchard	566	32.0	N/A
Conservative	Amy Irene Green	517	29.3	N/A
Green	Robert Charles Wood	232	13.1	N/A
Green	Peter Harvey	205	11.6	N/A
Turnout		1,766		
Registered electors		6,436		
Liberal Democrats win (new seat)				
Liberal Democrats win (new seat)				

== Changes 2022–2027 ==
- In March 2024, Crewkerne councillor Steve Ashton left the Conservatives and subsequently sat as a non-aligned councillor. He joined the Liberal Democrats in February 2025.
- In April 2024, Taunton South councillor Hazel Prior-Sankey left the Liberal Democrats to sit as a non-aligned councillor.
- In January 2025, Shepton Mallet councillor Bente Height left the Conservatives and joined Reform UK. Wellington councillor Marcus Barr, who had been elected as a Conservative and subsequently sat as an independent, joined Reform UK in March 2025.
- In January 2026, Highbridge and Burnham South councillor John Cook-Woodman left the Conservatives and joined Reform UK.

=== By-elections ===
==== Castle Cary ====
The Castle Cary by-election was triggered by the death of Conservative councillor Mike Lewis.

Castle Cary by-election, 10 August 2023
Party	Candidate	Votes	%	±%
Liberal Democrats	Kevin Messenger	1,247	54.8	+10.4
Conservative	David Hall	614	27.0	−15.7
Green	Ewan Jones	415	18.2	+5.3
Majority		633	27.8	
Turnout		2,276	28.3	
Liberal Democrats gain from Conservative		Swing	+13.1	

==== Somerton ====
The Somerton by-election was triggered by the death of Liberal Democrat councillor Dean Ruddle.

Somerton by-election, 28 March 2024
Party	Candidate	Votes	%	±%
Liberal Democrats	Stephen Page	1,212	50.1	−1.0
Conservative	David Hall	878	36.3	−2.2
Labour	Gregory Chambers	174	7.2	−0.5
Green	Matthew Geen	154	6.4	N/A
Majority		334	13.8	
Turnout		2,418	28.0	−15.3
Liberal Democrats hold		Swing	+0.6	

==== Mendip South ====
The Mendip South by-election followed the resignation of Liberal Democrat councillor Alex Wiltshire, who left the council after taking a job overseas.

Mendip South by-election, 2 May 2024
Party	Candidate	Votes	%	±%
Liberal Democrats	Rob Reed	1,313	47.3	−5.5
Conservative	Ken Maddock	1,122	40.4	−6.8
Green	Michael Kenneth Smyth	200	7.2	N/A
Labour	David Alan Oakensen	139	5.0	N/A
Majority		191	6.9	
Turnout		2,774	36.1	−7.9
Liberal Democrats hold		Swing	+0.7	

==== Blackmoor Vale ====
The Blackmoor Vale by-election followed the resignation of Liberal Democrat councillor Sarah Dyke.

Blackmoor Vale by-election, 21 November 2024
Party	Candidate	Votes	%	±%
Conservative	Hayward Burt	1,120	57.4	+13.1
Liberal Democrats	Howard Ellard	714	36.6	−19.1
Green	Peter Martin Ebsworth	86	4.4	N/A
Labour	Gregory Lawrence Chambers	32	1.6	N/A
Majority		406	20.8	
Turnout		1,952	26.1	
Conservative gain from Liberal Democrats		Swing	+16.1	

==== Rowbarton & Staplegrove ====
The Rowbarton & Staplegrove by-election followed the resignation of Liberal Democrat councillor Dixie Darch.

Rowbarton & Staplegrove by-election, 21 November 2024
Party	Candidate	Votes	%	±%
Liberal Democrats	Nick O'Donnell	817	58.3	+1.7
Conservative	Pete Prior-Sankey	396	28.3	−2.3
Green	Alan William Debenham	102	7.3	N/A
Labour	Moya Patricia Doherty	86	6.1	−6.7
Majority		421	30.0	
Turnout		1,401	18.3	
Liberal Democrats hold		Swing	+2.0	

==== Dunster ====
The Dunster by-election followed the resignation of Conservative councillor Christine Lawrence because of ill health.

Dunster by-election, 23 October 2025
Party	Candidate	Votes	%	±%
Liberal Democrats	Cara Strom	1,142	49.6	+8.5
Reform	Jonathan Rollason	666	28.9	N/A
Conservative	James Bellamy	449	19.5	−22.9
Labour	Terry Ledlie	44	1.9	−4.2
Majority		476	20.7	
Turnout		2,301	32.2	
Liberal Democrats gain from Conservative		Swing	+15.7	

==== Glastonbury ====
The Glastonbury by-election was triggered by the death of Liberal Democrat councillor Nick Cottle.

Glastonbury by-election, 23 October 2025
Party	Candidate	Votes	%	±%
Liberal Democrats	Ewan Cameron	882	36.4	−0.6
Reform	Henry Warne	523	21.6	N/A
Conservative	Lillith Osborn	506	20.9	−9.6
Green	Jonathon Cousins	480	19.8	−7.5
Labour	Gregory Chambers	35	1.4	N/A
Majority		359	14.8	
Turnout		2,426	33.5	−7.5
Liberal Democrats hold		Swing	+4.5	

==== Mendip Hills ====
The Mendip Hills by-election was triggered by the death of Liberal Democrat councillor Tony Robbins.

Mendip Hills by-election, 7 May 2026
Party	Candidate	Votes	%	±%
Liberal Democrats	Sam Phripp	1,534	41.5	−3.6
Reform	Greg Stone	936	25.3	N/A
Conservative	Nicola Jane Perold	724	19.6	−19.4
Green	Victoria Kate Welsh	330	8.9	−7.0
Independent	Abi McGuire	107	2.9	N/A
Labour	Terry Ledlie	64	1.7	N/A
Majority		598	16.2	
Turnout		3,695	46.8	+8.5
Liberal Democrats hold		Swing		

==== Frome West ====
The Frome West by-election was triggered by the disqualification of Green councillor Michael Dunk after he received a prison sentence of more than three months.

Frome West by-election, 3 September 2026
Party	Candidate	Votes	%	±%
Green	Dominic Ellison	663	41.4	−5.6
Liberal Democrats	Drew Gardner	544	34.0	+0.6
Reform	Joseph Williams	218	13.6	N/A
Labour	Christopher Wildridge	89	5.6	−1.0
Conservative	David Quantrill-Simon	87	5.4	−7.5
Majority		119	7.4	N/A
Turnout		1601	19.6	−18.9
Green hold		Swing		
