= 2019–2023 structural changes to local government in England =

Changes to local government authorities in England

English local authority districts by year of restructuring: 1986; 1995–1998: 1995 1996 1997 1998; 2009; 2019–2023: 2019 2020 2021 2023; 2027+: 2027 Paused or withdrawn Not yet announced

Structural changes to local government in England took place between 2019 and 2023. Some of these changes continue the trend of new unitary authorities being created from other types of local government districts, which was a policy of Communities Secretary Robert Jenrick from 2019.

Ceremonial counties have not seen any changes to their boundaries, as the Lieutenancies Act 1997 was amended to reflect the new local government areas that comprise them.

== Changes in 2019 ==
In all new authorities created in 2019, new councils were elected on 2 May 2019, at the same time as local elections in other parts of the country. See 2019 United Kingdom local elections for details.

=== Dorset ===
Dorset before (left) and after (right) the 2019 structural changes
- Status: Completed

On 1 April 2019, the non-metropolitan county of Dorset and its six non-metropolitan districts were abolished, along with the unitary authorities of Poole and Bournemouth, with two new unitary authorities created in their place. The new unitary authorities are:

- Bournemouth, Christchurch and Poole, covering the areas of the former unitary authorities of Bournemouth and Poole as well as the non-metropolitan district of Christchurch
- Dorset, which merged the five remaining non-metropolitan districts of East Dorset, North Dorset, Purbeck, West Dorset, and Weymouth and Portland, as well as the former county council

Charter trustees were established for Bournemouth and for Poole as a consequence. For details of the inaugural elections to the new councils, see 2019 Bournemouth, Christchurch and Poole Council election and 2019 Dorset Council election.

=== Somerset ===
Somerset before (left) and after (right) the 2019 structural changes
- Status: Completed

On 1 April 2019, the number of districts in the non-metropolitan county of Somerset was reduced from five to four, when Taunton Deane and West Somerset were merged as Somerset West and Taunton. This new district was not a unitary authority, and the two-tier structure of county and district councils remained in place.

Charter trustees were established for Taunton as a consequence. The inaugural election took place in 2019.

=== Suffolk ===
Suffolk before (left) and after (right) the 2019 structural changes
- Status: Completed

On 1 April 2019, the number of districts in Suffolk was reduced from seven to five. West Suffolk was created by merging Forest Heath and St Edmundsbury. East Suffolk was created by merging Suffolk Coastal and Waveney. These new districts are not unitary authorities, and the two-tier structure of county and district councils remains in place.

For details of the inaugural elections to the new councils, see 2019 East Suffolk District Council election and 2019 West Suffolk District Council election.

== Changes in 2020 ==
In all new authorities created in 2020, new councils were scheduled to be elected on 7 May 2020, along with local elections in other parts of the country. However, all local elections in the United Kingdom were postponed a year due to the COVID-19 pandemic, so elections scheduled for 2020 were instead held on 6 May 2021. See 2021 United Kingdom local elections for details.

=== Buckinghamshire ===
Buckinghamshire before (left) and after (right) the 2020 structural changes
- Status: Completed

A new unitary authority, Buckinghamshire Council, replaced Buckinghamshire County Council and the non-metropolitan districts of Aylesbury Vale, Chiltern, South Bucks, and Wycombe on 1 April 2020. This change was proposed by Martin Tett, leader of the county council, and backed by then-Communities Secretary James Brokenshire. It received approval from Parliament in May 2019. The existing unitary authority of Milton Keynes was not affected; since 1 April 2020, the ceremonial county of Buckinghamshire has therefore been composed of two unitary authorities.

Before this was approved by Parliament, the district councils had proposed a different plan in which Aylesbury Vale would become a unitary authority and the three southern districts would become another unitary authority. The district councils opposed the single unitary Buckinghamshire plan, and considered legal action against it.

For details of the inaugural elections to the new council, see 2021 Buckinghamshire Council election.

== Changes in 2021 ==
In all new authorities created in 2021, new councils were elected on 6 May 2021, at the same time as local elections in other parts of the country. See 2021 United Kingdom local elections for details.

=== Northamptonshire ===
Northamptonshire before (left) and after (right) the 2021 structural changes
- Status: Completed

On 1 April 2021, the non-metropolitan county of Northamptonshire and its seven districts were abolished, and two new unitary authorities were created:

- North Northamptonshire, consisting of the old non-metropolitan districts of Corby, East Northamptonshire, Kettering, and Wellingborough
- West Northamptonshire, consisting of the old non-metropolitan districts of Daventry, Northampton, and South Northamptonshire

The Conservative national government proposed the changes in Northamptonshire as a cost saving measure, as the Conservative-led county council had been experiencing financial difficulty. The joint committee for West Northamptonshire claimed that the changes would save 85 million pounds per year. The Northamptonshire (Structural Change) Order 2019 (SCO) was brought before Parliament in October 2019, but due to the dissolution of Parliament on 6 November leading up to the general election on 12 December 2019, the changes were not then given final approval. Parliament went on Christmas break after the election, and the Order was eventually made on 14 February 2020.

For details of the inaugural elections to the new councils, see 2021 North Northamptonshire Council election and 2021 West Northamptonshire Council election.

== Changes in 2023 ==
Several new authorities came into operation in April 2023. In each case, new councils were elected on 5 May 2022, at the same time as local elections in other parts of the country. See 2023 United Kingdom local elections for details.

=== Cumbria ===
Cumbria before (left) and after (right) the 2023 structural changes
- Status: Completed

On 1 April 2023, the non-metropolitan county of Cumbria and its six districts were abolished and replaced by two unitary authorities:

- Cumberland, consisting of the old non-metropolitan districts of Allerdale, Carlisle, and Copeland
- Westmorland and Furness, consisting of the old non-metropolitan districts of Barrow-in-Furness, Eden, and South Lakeland

In October 2020, the UK government invited proposals for reform of arrangements in Cumbria by 2023. The area was previously served by the Cumbria County Council, as well as six non-metropolitan district councils.

Barrow Borough Council and South Lakeland District Council (in Cumbria) and Lancaster City Council (in Lancashire) proposed in 2020 to merge themselves into a Morecambe Bay unitary authority.

The idea of a Morecambe Bay authority has been proposed several times previously. If the Redcliffe-Maud Report had been implemented, Furness & North Lancashire would have been one of the unitary authorities within the North West Province. Before the unsuccessful 2004 North East England devolution referendum, when similar referendums were also planned in North West England and Yorkshire and the Humber, one proposed structure below the region level in North West England would have created a Morecambe Bay unitary authority, with the rest of Cumbria and Lancashire being divided into more unitary authorities.

In July 2021, local government minister Robert Jenrick approved plans for two new unitary authorities, Westmorland and Furness and Cumberland. Parliamentary approval would be sought around the end of 2021, with the intention of holding elections for the new councils in May 2022 and the councils going live in April 2023. The names for the proposed new authorities were announced in November 2021. The legislation required to bring the new structure into operation, the Cumbria (Structural Changes) Order 2022 (2022 No. 331), was made on 17 March 2022 and came into force the following day.

For details of the inaugural elections to the new councils, see 2022 Cumberland Council election and 2022 Westmorland and Furness Council election.

=== North Yorkshire ===
North Yorkshire before (left) and after (right) the 2023 structural changes
- Status: Completed

A new unitary authority, North Yorkshire Council, replaced North Yorkshire County Council and the non-metropolitan districts of Craven, Hambleton, Harrogate, Richmondshire, Ryedale, Scarborough and Selby on 1 April 2023.

In October 2020, the UK government invited proposals for reform of arrangements in North Yorkshire by 2023. The proposals were only to cover the areas of the non-metropolitan county of North Yorkshire and the City of York, and not the parts of North Yorkshire outside those two areas (Middlesbrough, Redcar and Cleveland, and the southern part of Stockton-on-Tees). Later that year, North Yorkshire County Council proposed a unitary authority to replace existing non-metropolitan districts (but not the City of York, which was already a separate unitary authority).

Around the same time, the districts of Craven, Harrogate, Richmondshire, Ryedale, Scarborough and Selby submitted a proposal for an "East & West model" of two unitary councils in North Yorkshire, including the City of York. The two new councils would cover Ryedale, Scarborough, Selby and York in the east, and Craven, Hambleton, Harrogate and Richmondshire in the west.

In July 2021, local government minister Robert Jenrick approved plans for a single unitary authority, to be known as North Yorkshire Council. Parliamentary approval would be sought around the end of 2021, with the intention of the councils going live in April 2023. County councillors elected in May 2022 would serve for an extended term of five years, continuing as councillors for the new authority from 2023.

For details of the inaugural elections to the new council, see 2022 North Yorkshire Council election.

=== Somerset ===
Somerset before (left) and after (right) the 2023 structural changes
- Status: Completed

A new unitary authority, Somerset Council, replaced Somerset County Council and the non-metropolitan districts of Mendip, Sedgemoor, Somerset West and Taunton, and South Somerset on 1 April 2023.

Changes in Somerset have been under consideration since at least 2018. The existing unitary authorities of Bath and North East Somerset and North Somerset were not affected by any of these proposals. In October 2020, the UK government invited proposals for reform of arrangements in Somerset by 2023. There were two rival proposals: a single unitary council, or two unitary councils (east and west).

In 2020, the county council submitted a proposal known as "One Somerset" to the government. Under this plan, the county council and the four non-metropolitan districts of Mendip, Sedgemoor, Somerset West and Taunton and South Somerset would be replaced by a single unitary authority to be known as Somerset Council.

The four district councils had created a rival proposal, known as "Stronger Somerset", where the county and district councils would be replaced by two unitary authorities. Mendip and South Somerset would be merged to create Eastern Somerset, while Sedgemoor and Somerset West and Taunton would be merged to create Western Somerset. The district councils argued that a single authority would be too far removed from the citizens, and said that forming two instead of one would help save £204 million. District councillors agreed to this plan in August 2020.

In May 2021, a poll organised by the district councils found 65% support for the two-council Stronger Somerset proposal. Despite this public vote, the single unitary council proposal was approved by the Secretary of State, Robert Jenrick, in July 2021. Parliamentary approval was to be sought around the end of 2021, with the intention of holding elections for the new Somerset Council in May 2022 and the council going live in April 2023.

For details of the inaugural elections to the new council, see 2022 Somerset Council election.

== Other proposals ==
=== Essex ===
Essex

- Status: Proposed

In February 2021, it was reported that Basildon and Thurrock councils were in talks to form a new unitary authority with a population of over 350,000. Thurrock is already unitary, while Basildon is within the area of Essex County Council.

Around 2022, the district councils of Essex proposed a "Greater Essex" devolution deal which would include the unitary authorities of Southend-on-Sea City Council and Thurrock.

In December 2024, Basildon councillors proposed five unitary districts, namely South West (from Basildon and Thurrock), South East (from Southend-on-Sea, Castle Point and Rochford), Mid (from Chelmsford, Brentwood and Maldon), North West (from Epping Forest, Harlow and Uttlesford) and North East (Braintree, Colchester and Tendring).

=== Gloucestershire ===
Gloucestershire

- Status: Proposed

In August 2020, it was reported that Cheltenham Borough Council, Cotswold District Council and Stroud District Council were exploring ways to create unitary authorities for their county. The plans would affect Gloucestershire County Council and all six of its districts (not including South Gloucestershire, which is already a unitary authority). It was suggested that there could be two new unitary authorities: one in the west of the county (Gloucester, Stroud and Forest of Dean) and another in the east (Tewkesbury, Cheltenham and Cotswold). Mark Hawthorne, leader of the county council, described the proposals as "nuts".

=== Kent ===
Kent

- Status: Withdrawn

In the east of Kent in 2016, Dover, Ashford, Thanet, Shepway and Canterbury district councils proposed a five-way merger to take effect in 2019, although the new body would remain within the established two-tier arrangement under the county council. Following the withdrawal of interest from Shepway (later renamed Folkestone and Hythe) and Ashford councils, the remaining authorities decided not to take matters further.

=== Lancashire ===
Lancashire

- Status: Proposed

In 2020–21, Lancashire County Council leader Geoff Driver mentioned that the council was in talks to abolish the existing 15 councils in the county (the county council, 12 district councils and 2 unitary councils). In place of these districts and boroughs, they proposed creating three new unitary authorities which would also include Blackburn with Darwen and Blackpool. He suggested one unitary authority called "Central Lancashire" could be formed to cover the pre-existing new town proposal which would include the Borough of Chorley, South Ribble, Preston and West Lancashire. Another authority called "North West Lancashire" would cover the City of Lancaster, Fylde, Wyre, Blackpool, and Ribble Valley, while "East Pennine Lancashire" would cover the Borough of Burnley, Pendle, Hyndburn, Rossendale and Blackburn with Darwen. However, these proposals have not been so far reviewed by the government.

Other unitary authority proposals around the county included a 2020 idea for a new unitary authority covering the aforementioned "Central Lancashire"; however, the councils excluded Preston City Council from being a part of the proposal.

In 2021, the government and Lancashire County Council rejected a proposal put forward by the councils of the Borough of Barrow-in-Furness, South Lakeland and City of Lancaster to form a new unitary authority covering part of the historical county of Lancashire which included the Borough of Barrow-in-Furness and parts of South Lakeland. This would have placed parts of Cumbria back into Lancashire and would have meant it gained the towns of Ambleside, Bowness-on-Windmere, Kendal, Kirkby Lonsdale, Windermere, and Sedbergh which were part of Westmorland and the West Riding of Yorkshire.

Proposals for unitary authorities continue as of November 2021.

=== Lincolnshire ===
Lincolnshire

- Status: Proposed

In 2021, the Borough of Boston, East Lindsey and South Holland councils formed the South & East Lincolnshire Councils Partnership, a joint venture which aims to save £42m across the Councils over 10 years. As of November 2021, the talk of reorganising Lincolnshire has come under criticism and proposals and planning is still ongoing.

=== Oxfordshire ===
Oxfordshire

- Status: Proposed

A unitary authority in Oxfordshire had been proposed by Oxford City Council, just for the city of Oxford, and by Oxfordshire County Council for the county as a whole, in 2006.

Plans re-emerged a decade later, with a new proposal from Oxfordshire County Council that was supported by then-Prime Minister, and MP for Witney, David Cameron, but opposed by Oxford City Council.

In 2017, Oxfordshire County Council conducted an engagement exercise across the county to understand views on the possible creation of a new unitary council to replace the existing councils. A year later, the Government announced that the plans had been shelved. Despite this, the idea came under further discussion in 2020 after suggestions from the leadership of the County Council and Cherwell District Council.

=== Staffordshire ===
Staffordshire

- Status: Proposed

In 2020, it was proposed by the Centre for Cities think tank that the neighbouring districts of Newcastle-under-Lyme and Staffordshire Moorlands should merge into a single unitary authority with the city of Stoke-on-Trent to form a new unitary authority known as "Greater Stoke". Settlements in the area would include Newcastle-under-Lyme, Kidsgrove, Cheadle, Leek and Biddulph.

As well as the "Greater Stoke" unitary proposal, other proposed unitary authorities in the county include one combining Stafford Borough, Cannock Chase and East Staffordshire into a "Staffordshire" unitary authority. This would include outlying towns such as Stafford, Cannock and Burton-upon-Trent. The districts of Lichfield, South Staffordshire and Tamworth would become full members of the West Midlands Combined Authority as part of the wider West Midlands county, although it is unclear if they would remain separate districts or form a new unitary authority.

=== Warwickshire ===
Warwickshire

- Status: Proposed

In 2021, the district councils of Stratford and Warwick announced their intention to merge to form a new "South Warwickshire" district with a population of 274,000. As of January 2022, the proposal has not been approved by central government or pursued further by either council.

=== Worcestershire ===
Worcestershire

- Status: Proposed

A unitary authority for south Worcestershire – covering the city of Worcester and the Malvern Hills and Wychavon districts – was suggested in 2016 by Paul Denham, at the time a city and county councillor and mayor of the city. The idea was discussed in 2018 by Wychavon District councillors including the leader of the Liberal Democrats at the time, Councillor Margaret Rowley. However, the leaders of the Labour and Conservative groups on Worcester City Council spoke out against the suggestion, arguing that Worcester should have its own unitary authority rather than be subsumed by a wider authority.

In 2019, Bromsgrove independent councillor Steve Colella suggested that Worcestershire should be merged with other councils in the local region. In the following year, the leader of Redditch Borough Council, Councillor Matt Dormer backed plans to split the county into unitary authorities, arguing that "Redditch has never had its fair share from the County". He also said that he was open to either cross-border authorities or a two-authority model for Worcestershire, and praised neighbouring Warwickshire for following the government's proposals.

== English Devolution Bill ==
The Labour Party returned to power following the 2024 general election, and in her Autumn budget statement, Chancellor of the Exchequer Rachel Reeves outlined that a forthcoming English Devolution Bill would include plans for "working with councils to move to simpler structures that make sense for their local areas", suggesting that a new round of local government reorganisation could be likely.

== See also ==
- History of local government in England
- Local government in England
- Earlier local government reforms:
  - 1974 structural changes to local government in England
  - 1995–1998 structural changes to local government in England
  - 2009 structural changes to local government in England
- Later local government reforms:
  - 2027–2028 planned structural changes to local government in England
