= Value Jersey =

Political movement

- Founded: October 2025
- Type: Political movement
- Location: Jersey
- Website: valuejersey.je

Value Jersey is a political movement in Jersey, launched in October 2025. It said that it aimed to bring islanders and experts together to develop responses to Jersey's economic challenges and to influence the policy agenda of the States Assembly elected in 2026.

== Political orientation ==
Value Jersey describes its outlook as focused on affordability, economic growth and government efficiency. Its policy programme emphasised lower taxes, spending restraint, deregulation, increased competition in retail, taxis and banking, digital government reform, and support for business growth. The movement presented these policies as evidence-based and practical rather than ideological, while ITV reported that one of its leaders said the group did not have a clear leaning to either the political left or right.

== Status ==
Value Jersey is not a political party registered under the Political Parties (Registration)(Jersey) Law 2008 and did not field or endorse candidates. Its role was comparable to Independents for Frome, a local political grouping based in Frome, Somerset, UK. It is known for its independent and non party-political approach and for its espousal of a series of ideas that have become known as "flatpack democracy".

The organisation was initially registered as a company in the United Kingdom, but since May 2026 has been registered as a private company under the Companies (Jersey) Law 1991.

== Influence in 2026 general election ==
Nine candidates standing as independents at the 2026 general election expressed support in their manifestos for Value Jersey's priorities, which were set out in a document known as 'the purple book'. Candidates were able to buy a package of support from Value Jersey, including help with campaign planning, speech-writing, emails, and printed materials, and advice from political consultants, including from The Messina Group.

Unlock Democracy was among those to criticise the movement for what critics described as a lack of transparency about its donors and funding. Value Jersey board members rejected the criticism, saying there was 'significant misinformation' about the organisation. Value Jersey clarified that the movement had received 58 donations from anonymous supporters, including a donation of £10,000 and one donation from a UK-based individual with business interests in Jersey. Lee Madden resigned as President of the Jersey Chamber of Commerce in June 2026 following concern over a personal donation he had made to Value Jersey before taking up the role. It later transpired he had been asked to resign by the retail committee (Value Jersey has argued that Jersey needs a cheaper supermarket in the island and there is concern that the resignation was demanded by 'vested interests').

Six candidates endorsing Value Jersey were elected. Among named parties and political movements, Value Jersey-associated candidates formed the second-largest group in the new Assembly after Reform Jersey, which won seven seats.

Candidates endorsing Value Jersey in the 2026 general election
Candidate	Contest	Result
Serena Kersten Guthrie	Senator	Elected
Samantha Gleave	Deputy, St Helier South	Elected
Gerald Voisin	Deputy, St Helier North	Elected
Robert Parker	Deputy, St Saviour	Elected
Gabriel Raimondo	Deputy, St Brelade	Elected
Phil Romeril	Deputy, St John, St Lawrence and Trinity	Elected
Claire de Than	Deputy, St Helier Central	Not elected
Judy Martin	Deputy, St Helier South	Not elected
Cameron Monro	Deputy, St Helier Central	Not elected

== See also ==
- Political parties in Jersey
- Pressure groups in Jersey
- Politics of Jersey
- Constitution of Jersey
