= Results of the 2026 Jersey general election =

This article contains the full results of the 2026 Jersey general election by constituency.

During the 2026 election, 9 independent candidates publicly associated themselves with the political movement Value Jersey. As it is not formally registered as a party, they are formally independent candidates. For the purposes of these result tables, party labels include political affiliation where candidates fit this criterion.

Candidates in bold were elected. An asterisk denotes a candidate who was a sitting States Member immediately before the election. Results were sourced from BBC News, the Jersey Evening Post, and Vote.je.

== Results for senators ==
Party	Candidate	Votes	%	±%
Independent	**Helen Miles**	15,859	58.44	New
Independent	**Ian Gorst**	15,667	57.74	New
Independent	**Lyndon Farnham**	14,217	52.39	New
Independent	**Elaine Millar**	14,208	52.36	New
Value Jersey	**Serena Kersten Guthrie**	12,588	46.39	New
Independent	**Tom Binet**	12,584	46.37	New
Independent	**Alan Maclean**	12,506	46.09	New
Independent	**Mark Boleat**	11,948	44.03	New
Independent	**Mary Le Hegarat**	11,571	42.64	New
Reform Jersey	Sam Mézec	9,374	34.54	New
Independent	Steve Luce	8,669	31.95	New
Independent	Bernard Place	6,675	24.60	New
Independent	Alan Le Pavoux	6,294	23.19	New
Independent	Martin Aliga	5,390	19.86	New
Independent	Alan Breckon	4,412	16.26	New
Independent	Guy de Faye	2,979	10.97	New
Independent	Karl Busch	1,688	6.22	New
Turnout		27,133		

== Results for connétables ==
The results for the elections for Connétables were as follows:

=== Grouville ===
Party	Candidate	Votes	%	±%
**Independent**	**Mark Labey***	**1,398**	**75.0**	
	None of the candidates	466	25.0	
Majority		932	50.0	
Total valid votes		1,864	99.2	
Rejected ballots		15	0.8	
Turnout		1,879		
Independent **hold**				

=== St Brelade ===
St Brelade
Party	Candidate	Votes	%	±%
**Independent**	**Steve Pallett**	**2,093**	**61.0**	**New**
Independent	Mike Jackson*	1,339	39.0	
Majority		754	22.0	N/A
Total valid votes		3,432	96.7	
Rejected ballots		116	3.3	
Turnout		3,548		
Independent **gain** from Independent		Swing		

=== St Clement ===
St Clement
Party	Candidate	Votes	%	±%
**Independent**	**Marcus Troy***	**2,078**	**80.9**	
	None of the candidates	490	19.1	
Majority		1,588	61.8	
Total valid votes		2,568	97.8	
Rejected ballots		57	2.2	
Turnout		2,625		
Independent **hold**				

=== St Helier ===
Party	Candidate	Votes	%	±%
**Independent**	**Inna Gardiner**	**2,740**	**40.8**	**New**
Reform Jersey	Rob Ward	1,960	29.2	New
Independent	David Warr	1,153	17.2	New
Independent	Mark Le Chevalier	781	11.6	
Independent	Alvin Aaron	75	1.1	New
Majority		780	11.6	
Total valid votes		6,709		
Rejected ballots				
Turnout				
Independent **gain** from Independent		Swing		

=== St John ===
St John
Party	Candidate	Votes	%	±%
**Independent**	**Andy Jehan***	**1,096**	**93.1**	
	None of the candidates	81	6.9	
Majority		1,015	86.2	
Total valid votes		1,177	92.4	
Rejected ballots		97	7.6	
Turnout		1,274		
Independent **hold**				

=== St Lawrence ===
Party	Candidate	Votes	%	±%
**Independent**	**Tina Palmer**	**1,151**	**65.43**	
Independent	John Le Fondré	608	34.57	
Majority		543	30.87	
Total valid votes		1,759		

=== St Martin ===
Party	Candidate	Votes	%	±%
**Independent**	**Karen Shenton Stone***	**1,222**	**85.9**	
	None of the candidates	201	14.1	
Majority		1,021	71.7	
Total valid votes		1,423	98.7	
Rejected ballots		19	1.3	
Turnout		1,442		
Independent **hold**				

=== St Mary ===
St Mary
Party	Candidate	Votes	%	±%
**Independent**	**David Johnson***	**406**	**52.5**	
Independent	Ivor Barette	211	27.3	New
Independent	Mark Baker	156	20.2	New
Majority		195	25.2	
Total valid votes		773	98.3	
Rejected ballots		13	1.7	
Turnout		786		
Independent **hold**		Swing		

=== St Ouen ===
Party	Candidate	Votes	%	±%
**Independent**	**Richard Honeycombe***	**1,107**		
	None of the candidates	409		
Rejected ballots		33		
Turnout				

=== St Peter ===
Party	Candidate	Votes	%	±%
**Independent**	**Richard Vibert***	**1,289**		
	None of the candidates	225		
Rejected ballots				
Turnout				

=== St Saviour ===
Party	Candidate	Votes	%	±%
**Independent**	**Dave Curtis**	**1,295**	**40.41**	
Independent	Suzanne Webb	1,031	32.17	
Independent	Kevin Lewis*	879	27.43	
Majority		264	8.24	
Total valid votes		3,205		

=== Trinity ===
Party	Candidate	Votes	%	±%
**Independent**	**Andy Howell**	**853**	**71.4**	**New**
Independent	Steve de Louche	342	28.6	New
Majority		511	42.8	
Total valid votes		1,195	98.8	
Rejected ballots		14	1.2	
Turnout		1,209		
Independent **gain** from Jersey Alliance		Swing		

== Results for deputies ==
The results for the elections for Deputy were as follows:

=== St Helier South ===
St Helier South
Party	Candidate	Votes	%	±%
**Value Jersey**	**Samantha Gleave**	**953**	**45.6**	**New**
**Reform Jersey**	**Tom Coles***	**791**	**37.9**	
**Reform Jersey**	**Beatriz Porée***	**733**	**35.1**	
Reform Jersey	Carla Jardim	706	33.8	
Value Jersey	Judy Martin	682	32.6	
Independent	Jason Lagadu	416	19.9	New
Independent	Bernie Manning	378	18.1	
People First	Nick Le Cornu	349	16.7	
People First	Andrew Sinclair	310	14.8	New
Total valid votes		2,089	97.5	
Rejected ballots		54	2.5	
Turnout		2,143		
Value Jersey **gain** from Reform Jersey				
Reform Jersey **hold**				
Reform Jersey **hold**				

=== St Helier Central ===
Party	Candidate	Votes	%	±%
**Reform Jersey**	**Carina Alves***	**1,106**	**18.04**	
**Reform Jersey**	**Lyndsay Feltham***	**982**	**16.01**	
**Reform Jersey**	**Catherine Curtis***	**850**	**13.86**	
**Reform Jersey**	**Lee Carpenter**	**833**	**13.58**	**New**
Independent	Robin Ward	811	13.24	New
Value Jersey	Claire de Than	582	9.47	New
Value Jersey	Cameron Monro	524	8.55	New
Independent	John Ttokkallos	444	7.24	New
Total valid votes		6,132		
Rejected ballots		17		

A recount was held after 21 votes initially separated Lee Carpenter, the final elected candidate, and Robin Ward, the highest-placed unelected candidate. The recount confirmed Carpenter had retained the fourth and final seat, with Ward's total revised from 812 to 811.

=== St Helier North ===
Party	Candidate	Votes	%	±%
**Value Jersey**	**Gerald Voisin**	**1,572**	**24.96**	**New**
**Independent**	**Max Andrews***	**1,223**	**19.42**	
**Independent**	**Victoria Li**	**1,058**	**16.80**	**New**
Independent	Steve Ahier*	946	15.02	
Independent	Ian Barnes	917	14.56	New
Reform Jersey	Kevin O'Connell	583	9.26	New
Total valid votes		6,299		

=== St Saviour ===
Party	Candidate	Votes	%	±%
**Independent**	**Malcolm Ferey***	**2,225**	**24.77**	
**Independent**	**Louise Doublet***	**2,013**	**22.41**	
**Independent**	**Chris Leck**	**1,691**	**18.83**	
**Independent**	**Robert Parker**	**1,586**	**17.66**	
Reform Jersey	Raluca Kovacs*	1,466	16.32	
Total valid votes		8,981		

=== St Clement ===
St Clement
Party	Candidate	Votes	%	±%
**Independent**	**Alex Curtis***	**1,384**	**20.41**	
**Independent**	**Barbara Ward***	**1,208**	**17.82**	
**Independent**	**Karen Wilson***	**1,205**	**17.77**	
Independent	Lindsay Ash	1,091	16.09	
Independent	Joanne Vandermerwe-Mahon	837	12.35	
Reform Jersey	Noah Jervis	528	7.79	
Reform Jersey	Mick Robbins	527	7.77	
Total valid votes		6,780		

=== St Brelade ===
Party	Candidate	Votes	%	±%
Independent	**Jonathan Renouf***	2,414	33.11	
Reform Jersey	**Monty Tadier***	2,122	29.10	
Value Jersey	**Gabriel Raimondo**	1,603	21.99	New
Reform Jersey	John Young	1,152	15.80	New
Rejected ballots				
Turnout				

=== St Mary, St Ouen, and St Peter ===
Party	Candidate	Votes	%	±%
**Independent**	**Lucy Stephenson***	**2,318**	**24.14**	
**Independent**	**Christopher Rebindaine**	**2,205**	**22.96**	
**Independent**	**Arlene Maltman**	**2,046**	**21.30**	
Independent	David Benn	1,167	12.15	
Independent	Russell Labey	1,012	10.54	
Reform Jersey	Helen Evans	856	8.91	
Total valid votes		9,604		
Rejected ballots		78		
Turnout		9,682		

=== St John, St Lawrence, and Trinity ===
Party	Candidate	Votes	%	±%
**Independent**	**Hilary Jeune***	**3,020**	**31.78**	
**Value Jersey**	**Phil Romeril**	**2,781**	**29.26**	
**Independent**	**Kirsten Morel***	**2,252**	**23.70**	
Independent	Peter McLinton	1,451	15.27	
Total valid votes		9,504		
Rejected ballots		91		
Turnout		9,595		

=== Grouville and St Martin ===
Party	Candidate	Votes	%	±%
**Independent**	**Carolyn Labey***	**2,379**	**43.04**	
**Independent**	**Rose Binet***	**1,846**	**33.39**	
Independent	Scott Wickenden	1,303	23.57	
Total valid votes		5,528		
Rejected ballots		82		
Turnout		5,610		
