= Gabriel Raimondo =

Jersey politician

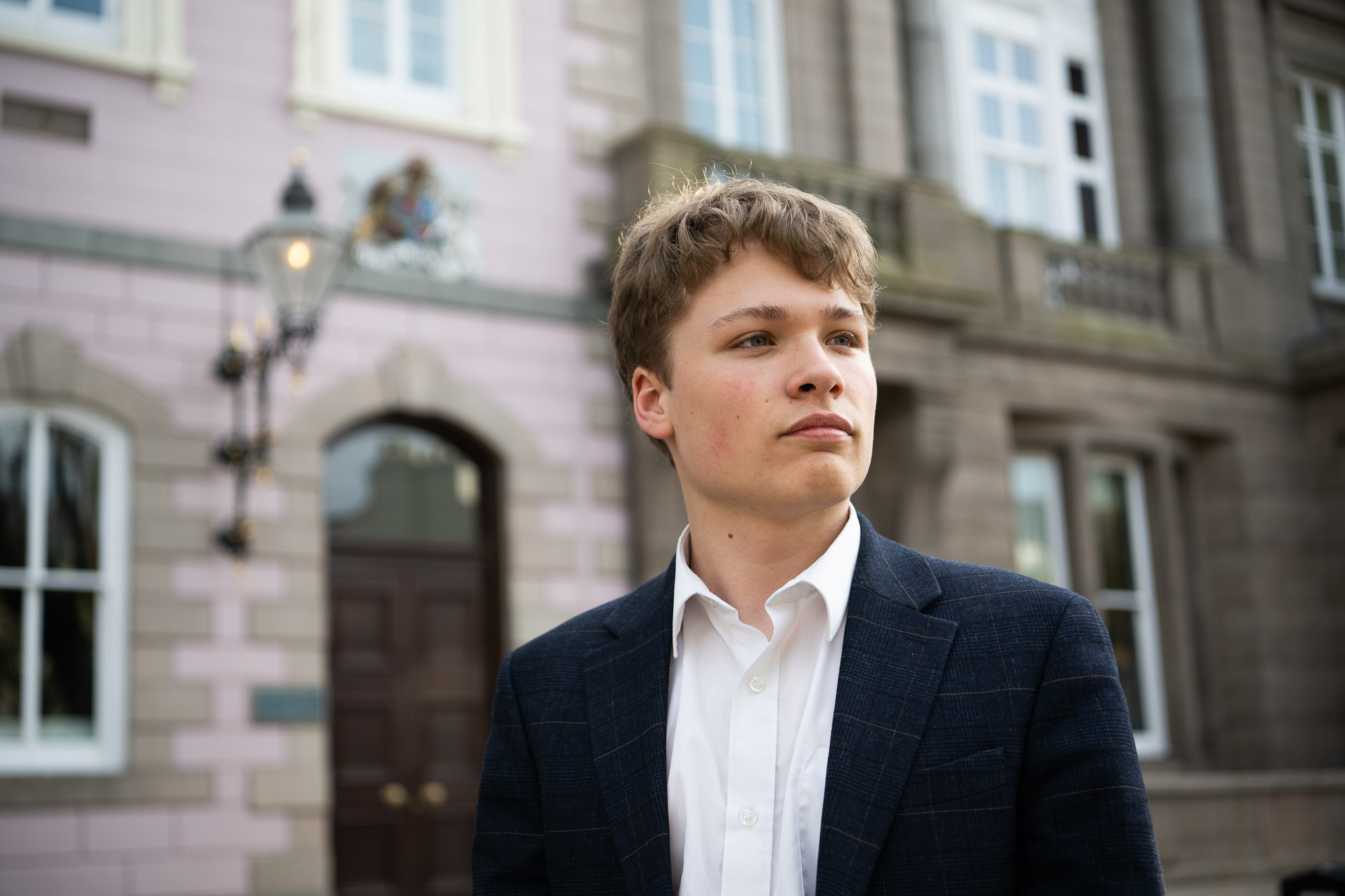

Deputy for St Brelade
- Incumbent
- Assumed office 12 June 2026

Personal details
- Born: 28 May 2008 (age 18)
- Party: Independent
- Other political affiliations: Value Jersey (political movement)
- Website: www.gabrielraimondo.com

Gabriel Raimondo (born 28 May 2008) is a Jersey politician who was elected as a Deputy for St Brelade in the States Assembly at the 2026 Jersey general election.

He is widely considered the youngest elected politician in the world.

== Political career ==
Raimondo stood as an independent candidate for Deputy in St Brelade at the 2026 Jersey general election. His campaign focused on the cost of living, economic opportunity, transport, and parish issues in St Brelade. He said he endorsed the principles of the political movement Value Jersey. His campaign was met with severe backlash and abuse on social media.

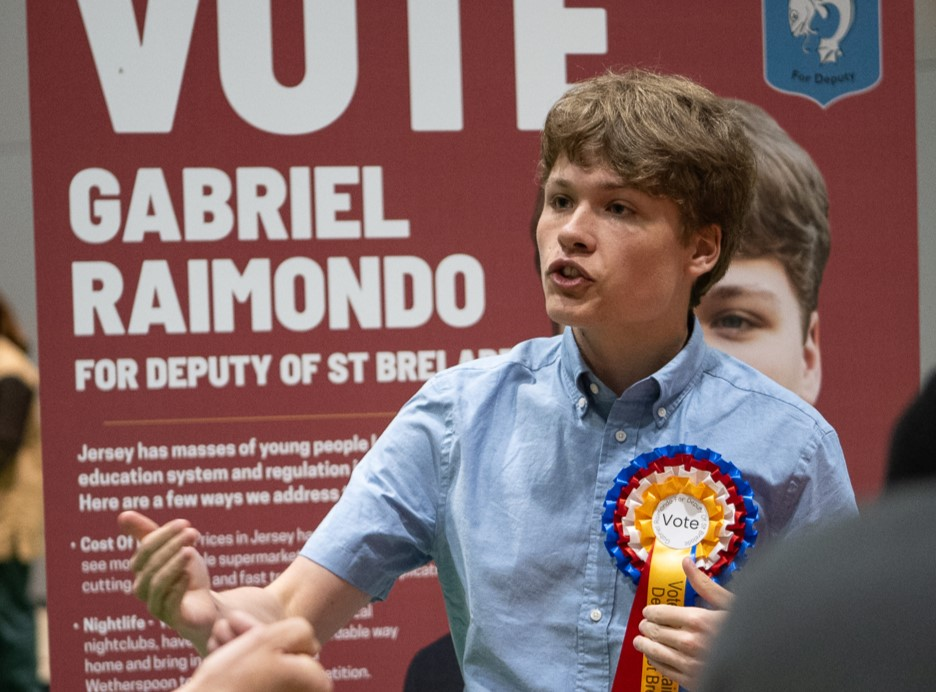
Gabriel Raimondo debates a fellow candidate

He was elected after finishing third in the St Brelade deputy poll with 1603 votes, coming in behind Jonathan Renouf and Montfort Tadier. ITV News described him as "one of the world's youngest politicians", reporting that he was 18 at the time of his election and had delayed his A-Level exams to campaign. Bailiwick Express reported that he was set to become the youngest ever States Member. Raimondo was officially sworn in on 12 June 2026.

ITV News also reported that news of Raimondo's election reached the White House, with United States President Donald Trump wishing him "a lot of luck".
