= Gerald Voisin =

Jersey politician

Deputy Gerald Voisin

Minister for Sustainable Economic Development
- Incumbent
- Assumed office 30 June 2026
- Preceded by: Kirsten Morel

Deputy of St Helier North
- Incumbent
- Assumed office 2026

President of the Economic Development Committee
- In office 2002–2005

Deputy of St Lawrence
- In office 1999–2005

Personal details
- Born: Francis Gerald Voisin
- Party: Independent (endorsing Value Jersey policy priorities)

Gerald Voisin is a Jersey politician serving in the Council of Ministers as the Minister for Sustainable Economic Development since 2026. He has been a Deputy in the States Assembly since 2026, representing St Helier North as an independent. He previously served as a Deputy from 1999 to 2005.

== Business career ==
Outside politics, Voisin has been associated with Voisins Department Store, the family-owned department store on King Street, St Helier. The business was founded in 1837 as a haberdashery shop at 26 King Street, and later became one of Jersey's best-known local retailers. Voisin joined the business after leaving school, spent time working at Harrods, and later bought the company from his father.

== Political career ==
Voisin was first elected to the States Assembly in 1999 as Deputy of St Lawrence, and served until 2005. He served on the Finance and Economics Committee and the Policy and Resources Committee, before becoming the first president of the Economic Development Committee in 2002. In that role he was associated with the Economic Growth Plan adopted by the States Assembly in 2005. Shortly afterwards he argued for measures to encourage investment in the tourism industry.

Voisin was associated with Value Jersey before the 2026 election. At the movement's launch event in October 2025, he was listed by Bailiwick Express among a "range of other speakers", and was reported as saying that Jersey's entrepreneurial spirit was being stifled and needed to be set free. At the 2026 election, he stood as an independent candidate in St Helier North while endorsing Value Jersey’s policy priorities, and was elected as one of the constituency's Deputies.

In June 2026, Chief Minister Lyndon Farnham nominated Voisin as Minister for Sustainable Economic Development. He was subsequently appointed by the States Assembly.
