= 2019 Somerset West and Taunton District Council election =

2019 Council Election in England

- 2 May 2019

All 59 seats of Somerset West and Taunton District Council 30 seats needed for a majority
	First party	Second party	Third party
Party	Liberal Democrats	Independent	Conservative
Seats won	30	14	10
Percentage	41%	16%	30%
	Fourth party	Fifth party	Sixth party
Party	Labour	Green	UKIP
Seats won	3	2	0
Percentage	8%	5%	>1%
- Map showing the results of the 2019 Somerset West and Taunton Council elections. Blue showing Conservative, Red showing Labour, Yellow showing Liberal Democrats, Green showing Greens and Grey showing Independents. Striped wards have mixed representation.
Council control before election
Conservative (Taunton Deane)
Conservative (West Somerset)
Council control after election
Liberal Democrats

The 2019 Somerset West and Taunton District Council election took place on 2 May 2019 to elect members of Somerset West and Taunton District Council in Somerset, England. This was the first election since the West Somerset District Council and Taunton Deane merged, with the whole council being up for election.

== Overall election result ==
Somerset West and Taunton District Council Election Result 2019
Party	Seats	Gains	Losses	Net gain/loss	Seats %	Votes %	Votes	+/−
Liberal Democrats	30	N/A	N/A	N/A	50.9	41.0	29,257	N/A
Independent	14	N/A	N/A	N/A	23.7	14.7	10,458	N/A
Conservative	10	N/A	N/A	N/A	17.0	30.7	21,928	N/A
Labour	3	N/A	N/A	N/A	5.1	7.9	5,668	N/A
Green	2	N/A	N/A	N/A	3.4	5.0	3,595	N/A
UKIP	0	N/A	N/A	N/A	0.0	0.6	411	N/A

== Results by ward ==
=== Alcombe ===
Alcombe
Party	Candidate	Votes	%	±%
Independent	Paul Bolton	236	37.6	
Liberal Democrats	Nicole Hawkins*	204	32.5	
Conservative	Michael Keenan	119	19.0	
Labour	Andrew Mountford	68	10.8	
Majority		32	5.1	
Turnout		631	32.4	
Rejected ballots		4	0.6	
Registered electors		1,948		
Independent win (new seat)				

=== Blackbrook & Holway ===
Blackbrook & Holway (2 seats)
Party	Candidate	Votes	%	±%
Liberal Democrats	Hazel Prior-Sankey*	1,072	75.7	
Liberal Democrats	Francesca Smith*	883	62.4	
Conservative	Richard Boyden	242	17.1	
Conservative	David Reed	236	16.7	
Labour	Peter Ernest	179	12.6	
Majority		641	45.3	
Turnout		1,443	31.5	
Rejected ballots		27	1.9	
Registered electors		4,578		
Liberal Democrats win (new seat)				
Liberal Democrats win (new seat)				

=== Comeytrowe & Bishop's Hull ===
Comeytrowe & Bishop's Hull (3 seats)
Party	Candidate	Votes	%	±%
Independent	John Hunt	1,857	58.4	
Liberal Democrats	Simon Nicholls*	1,513	47.6	
Liberal Democrats	Habib Farbahi*	1,433	45.0	
Liberal Democrats	Bev Fernandes	1,400	44.0	
Conservative	Jean Allgrove	463	14.6	
Conservative	Nicholas Clark	402	12.6	
Conservative	Jackie Wright	316	9.9	
Majority		33	1.0	
Turnout		3,193	47.0	
Rejected ballots		12	0.4	
Registered electors		6,788		
Independent win (new seat)				
Liberal Democrats win (new seat)				
Liberal Democrats win (new seat)				

=== Cotford St Luke & Oake ===
Cotford St Luke & Oake
Party	Candidate	Votes	%	±%
Liberal Democrats	John Hassall	317	46.8	
Conservative	Oliver Green	258	38.1	
Labour	Sandra Newing-Griffiths	103	15.2	
Majority		59	8.7	
Turnout		706	33.0	
Rejected ballots		28	4.0	
Registered electors		2,142		
Liberal Democrats win (new seat)				

=== Creech St Michael ===
Creech St Michael (2 seats)
Party	Candidate	Votes	%	±%
Independent	Dave Durdan	338	38.8	
Independent	Kelly Durdan	302	34.7	
Conservative	Simon Hutchings	292	33.5	
Liberal Democrats	Nick O'Donnell	288	33.1	
Liberal Democrats	Tony Sutcliffe	254	29.2	
Conservative	Denise Webber*	179	20.6	
Majority		10	1.1	
Turnout		884	38.0	
Rejected ballots		13	1.5	
Registered electors		2,324		
Independent win (new seat)				
Independent win (new seat)				

=== Dulverton & District ===
Dulverton & District
Party	Candidate	Votes	%	±%
Conservative	Nick Thwaites*	550	72.0	
Green	Caitlin Collins	214	28.0	
Majority		336	44.0	
Turnout		788	41.0	
Rejected ballots		24	3.0	
Registered electors		1,923		
Conservative win (new seat)				

=== Exmoor ===
Exmoor
Party	Candidate	Votes	%	±%
Conservative	Steven Pugsley*	732	82.7	
Liberal Democrats	Sue Levinge	153	17.3	
Majority		579	65.4	
Turnout		901	47.2	
Rejected ballots		16	1.8	
Registered electors		1,909		
Conservative win (new seat)				

=== Halcon & Lane ===
Halcon & Lane (2 seats)
Party	Candidate	Votes	%	±%
Liberal Democrats	Chris Booth	665	59.3	
Liberal Democrats	Federica Smith-Roberts*	660	58.8	
Conservative	Roger Ryan*	279	24.9	
Conservative	Sharon Fussell	237	21.1	
Labour	Stanley Ely	161	14.3	
Labour	Liam Canham	148	13.2	
Majority		381	34.0	
Turnout		1,154	27.0	
Rejected ballots		32	2.8	
Registered electors		4,264		
Liberal Democrats win (new seat)				
Liberal Democrats win (new seat)				

=== Hatch & Blackdown ===
Hatch & Blackdown
Party	Candidate	Votes	%	±%
Liberal Democrats	Ross Henley*	663	64.9	
Conservative	John Williams*	317	31.0	
Labour	Colin Croad	42	4.1	
Majority		346	33.9	
Turnout		1,040	47.6	
Rejected ballots		18	1.7	
Registered electors		2,183		
Liberal Democrats win (new seat)				

=== Manor & Tangier ===
Manor & Tangier
Party	Candidate	Votes	%	±%
Liberal Democrats	Martin Peters	380	39.1	
Independent	Ian Morrell*	286	29.4	
Conservative	Henry Haslam	230	23.7	
Labour	Matthew Ravenhill	76	7.8	
Majority		94	9.7	
Turnout		978	44.2	
Rejected ballots		6	0.6	
Registered electors		2,212		
Liberal Democrats win (new seat)				

=== Milverton & District ===
Milverton & District
Party	Candidate	Votes	%	±%
Independent	Gwil Wren*	578	58.8	
Conservative	Steven Wort	210	21.4	
Liberal Democrats	Eddie Eatwell	195	19.8	
Majority		368	37.4	
Turnout		989	47.4	
Rejected ballots		6	0.6	
Registered electors		2,088		
Independent win (new seat)				

=== Minehead Central ===
Minehead Central (2 seats)
Party	Candidate	Votes	%	±%
Conservative	Andrew Hadley*	422	37.0	
Independent	Craig Palmer	411	36.0	
Liberal Democrats	Andy Kingston-James*	359	31.4	
Conservative	Jean Parbrook*	299	26.2	
Independent	Steven Heard	295	25.8	
Liberal Democrats	Jill Dillamore	294	25.7	
Majority		52	4.6	
Turnout		1,150	33.4	
Rejected ballots		8	0.7	
Registered electors		3,443		
Conservative win (new seat)				
Independent win (new seat)				

=== Minehead North ===
Minehead North
Party	Candidate	Votes	%	±%
Independent	Terry Venner*	386	54.0	
Liberal Democrats	Glenys Harrison-Poole	177	24.8	
Conservative	Andy Parbrook	152	21.3	
Majority		209	29.2	
Turnout		728	37.6	
Rejected ballots		13	1.8	
Registered electors		1,934		
Independent win (new seat)				

=== Monument ===
Monument
Party	Candidate	Votes	%	±%
Conservative	Roger Habgood*	439	58.7	
Liberal Democrats	Sarah Lithgow	309	41.3	
Majority		130	17.4	
Turnout		792	35.7	
Rejected ballots		44	5.6	
Registered electors		2,216		
Conservative win (new seat)				

=== North Curry & Ruishton ===
North Curry & Ruishton (2 seats)
Party	Candidate	Votes	%	±%
Liberal Democrats	Phil Stone*	1,362	75.9	
Liberal Democrats	Sue Buller	1,090	60.8	
Conservative	William Coombes*	455	25.4	
Conservative	Debbie House	443	24.7	
Majority		635	35.4	
Turnout		1,831	44.5	
Rejected ballots		37	2.0	
Registered electors		4,116		
Liberal Democrats win (new seat)				
Liberal Democrats win (new seat)				

=== North Town ===
North Town
Party	Candidate	Votes	%	±%
Liberal Democrats	Caroline Ellis	490	64.1	
Conservative	George PinedaLangford	121	15.8	
Labour	Stuart Lyddon	80	10.5	
UKIP	Robert Bryant	74	9.7	
Majority		369	48.2	
Turnout		774	39.6	
Rejected ballots		9	1.2	
Registered electors		1,956		
Liberal Democrats win (new seat)				

=== Norton Fitzwarren & Staplegrove ===
Norton Fitzwarren & Staplegrove (3 seats)
Party	Candidate	Votes	%	±%
Liberal Democrats	Dixie Darch	929	55.9	
Liberal Democrats	Ed Firmin	818	49.2	
Independent	Jean Adkins*	525	31.6	
Green	Alan Debenham	478	28.8	
Conservative	Rod Williams	448	27.0	
Conservative	Caroline Tucker*	422	25.4	
Conservative	Edward Tucker	373	22.4	
Labour	Jonathan Gray	195	11.7	
Majority		47	2.8	
Turnout		1,672	34.5	
Rejected ballots		10	0.6	
Registered electors		4,851		
Liberal Democrats win (new seat)				
Liberal Democrats win (new seat)				
Independent win (new seat)				

=== Old Cleeve & District ===
Old Cleeve & District (2 seats)
Party	Candidate	Votes	%	±%
Liberal Democrats	Marcus Kravis	757	48.8	
Liberal Democrats	Peter Pilkington*	705	45.5	
Conservative	Martin Dewdney*	514	33.2	
Conservative	Brenda Maitland-Walker*	496	32.0	
Independent	Richard Lillis*	401	25.9	
Majority		191	12.3	
Turnout		1,576	40.7	
Rejected ballots		26	1.6	
Registered electors		3,869		
Liberal Democrats win (new seat)				
Liberal Democrats win (new seat)				

=== Periton & Woodcombe ===
Periton & Woodcombe
Party	Candidate	Votes	%	±%
Liberal Democrats	Benet Allen	353	53.9	
Independent	Toni Bloomfield	170	26.0	
Conservative	Gary Miele	132	20.2	
Majority		183	27.9	
Turnout		664	37.9	
Rejected ballots		9	1.4	
Registered electors		1,753		
Liberal Democrats win (new seat)				

=== Porlock & District ===
Porlock & District
Party	Candidate	Votes	%	±%
Conservative	Andy Milne	466	49.7	
Liberal Democrats	Scilla Barney	308	32.9	
UKIP	Ivor Jones*	163	17.4	
Majority		158	16.9	
Turnout		949	49.1	
Rejected ballots		12	1.3	
Registered electors		1,932		
Conservative win (new seat)				

=== Priorswood ===
Priorswood (3 seats)
Party	Candidate	Votes	%	±%
Labour	Libby Lisgo*	851	50.4	
Liberal Democrats	Lee Baker	689	40.8	
Labour	Brenda Weston	658	39.0	
Labour	Bob Rawle	657	38.9	
Liberal Democrats	Rosemary Sabel	569	33.7	
Conservative	Michael Adkins*	360	21.3	
Conservative	Marie Hill	346	20.5	
Conservative	Nicholas Townsend*	316	18.7	
Majority		1	0.1	
Turnout		1,724	26.4	
Rejected ballots		36	2.1	
Registered electors		6,528		
Labour win (new seat)				
Liberal Democrats win (new seat)				
Labour win (new seat)				

=== Quantock Vale ===
Quantock Vale
Party	Candidate	Votes	%	±%
Conservative	Chris Morgan	Unopposed		
Turnout		N/A		
Conservative win (new seat)				

=== Rockwell Green ===
Rockwell Green
Party	Candidate	Votes	%	±%
Independent	Marcus Barr	464	61.0	
Conservative	Janet Reed*	137	18.0	
Labour	Kieran Canham	80	10.5	
Liberal Democrats	Stephen Kaye	80	10.5	
Majority		327	43.0	
Turnout		777	38.3	
Rejected ballots		16	2.1	
Registered electors		2,031		
Independent win (new seat)				

=== South Quantock ===
South Quantock (2 seats)
Party	Candidate	Votes	%	±%
Liberal Democrats	Mike Rigby	1,188	59.3	
Conservative	Anthony Trollope-Bellew*	775	38.7	
Conservative	Mike Davis	748	37.3	
Green	Clive Martin	731	36.5	
Majority		27	1.3	
Turnout		2,030	48.9	
Rejected ballots		26	1.3	
Registered electors		4,146		
Liberal Democrats win (new seat)				
Conservative win (new seat)				

=== Trull, Pitminster & Corfe ===
Trull, Pitminster & Corfe (2 seats)
Party	Candidate	Votes	%	±%
Liberal Democrats	Sarah Wakefield	821	66.7	
Liberal Democrats	Martin Hill	595	48.4	
Conservative	Mark Edwards*	423	34.4	
Conservative	Chris Hill	323	26.3	
Labour	Neil Guild	119	9.7	
Majority		172	14.0	
Turnout		1,243	46.2	
Rejected ballots		13	1.0	
Registered electors		2,688		
Liberal Democrats win (new seat)				
Liberal Democrats win (new seat)				

=== Victoria ===
Victoria (2 seats)
Party	Candidate	Votes	%	±%
Liberal Democrats	Simon Coles*	594	53.1	
Liberal Democrats	Richard Lees*	571	51.1	
Conservative	Stephen Martin-Scott*	263	23.5	
Labour	Charlie Grabham	230	20.6	
UKIP	Edmund Bailhache	174	15.6	
Conservative	Ben Wong	172	15.4	
Majority		308	27.5	
Turnout		1,127	29.8	
Rejected ballots		9	0.8	
Registered electors		3,779		
Liberal Democrats win (new seat)				
Liberal Democrats win (new seat)				

=== Vivary ===
Vivary (2 seats)
Party	Candidate	Votes	%	±%
Liberal Democrats	Danny Wedderkopp*	709	49.7	
Conservative	Catherine Herbert*	581	40.7	
Independent	Nick Messarra	514	36.0	
Conservative	Andy Sully*	413	28.9	
Labour	Robert Noakes	261	18.3	
Majority		67	4.7	
Turnout		1,452	40.3	
Rejected ballots		25	1.7	
Registered electors		3,603		
Liberal Democrats win (new seat)				
Conservative win (new seat)				

=== Watchet & Williton ===
Watchet & Williton (3 seats)
Party	Candidate	Votes	%	±%
Independent	Hugh Davies*	1,260	61.9	
Independent	Ian Aldridge*	946	46.5	
Independent	Loretta Whetlor	704	34.6	
Conservative	Dave Westcott*	690	33.9	
Green	Mickie Ritchie	431	21.2	
Liberal Democrats	James Russell	381	18.7	
Conservative	Andrew Whitehorn	365	17.9	
Conservative	Stuart Dowding*	345	17.0	
Majority		14	0.7	
Turnout		2,044	37.5	
Rejected ballots		10	0.5	
Registered electors		5,446		
Independent win (new seat)				
Independent win (new seat)				
Independent win (new seat)				

=== Wellington East ===
Wellington East (2 seats)
Party	Candidate	Votes	%	±%
Liberal Democrats	Keith Wheatley	550	50.4	
Independent	Janet Lloyd	537	49.2	
Conservative	James Hunt*	426	39.0	
Conservative	Wayne Battishill	369	33.8	
Majority		111	10.2	
Turnout		1,111	32.0	
Rejected ballots		20	1.8	
Registered electors		3,474		
Liberal Democrats win (new seat)				
Independent win (new seat)				

=== Wellington North ===
Wellington North (2 seats)
Party	Candidate	Votes	%	±%
Labour	Andrew Govier*	723	61.2	
Liberal Democrats	Mark Lithgow	495	41.9	
Conservative	John Thorne	320	27.1	
Labour	Michael McGuffie	316	26.8	
Conservative	Kevin Wendt	208	17.6	
Majority		175	14.8	
Turnout		1,199	31.8	
Rejected ballots		18	1.5	
Registered electors		3,771		
Labour win (new seat)				
Liberal Democrats win (new seat)				

=== Wellington South ===
Wellington South
Party	Candidate	Votes	%	±%
Conservative	Vivienne Stock-Williams*	441	53.9	
Liberal Democrats	Nancy Powell-Brace	377	46.1	
Majority		64	7.8	
Turnout		851	39.2	
Rejected ballots		33	3.9	
Registered electors		2,171		
Conservative win (new seat)				

=== Wellsprings & Rowbarton ===
Wellsprings & Rowbarton (2 seats)
Party	Candidate	Votes	%	±%
Liberal Democrats	Marcia Hill*	690	49.6	
Liberal Democrats	Susan Lees*	619	44.5	
Labour	Mark Wood	390	28.0	
Labour	Lisa Martin	331	23.8	
Conservative	Greg Garner	326	23.4	
Conservative	Rod Watson	310	22.3	
Majority		229	16.5	
Turnout		1,423	32.6	
Rejected ballots		31	2.2	
Registered electors		4,366		
Liberal Democrats win (new seat)				
Liberal Democrats win (new seat)				

=== West Monkton & Cheddon Fitzpaine ===
West Monkton & Cheddon Fitzpaine (3 seats)
Party	Candidate	Votes	%	±%
Conservative	Norman Cavill*	739	47.6	
Liberal Democrats	Ray Tully	713	45.9	
Green	Andy Pritchard	671	43.2	
Liberal Democrats	Eamonn Leniston	625	40.2	
Conservative	Jason Woollacott	593	38.2	
Conservative	Giuseppe Fraschini	562	36.2	
Majority		46	3.0	
Turnout		1,576	30.3	
Rejected ballots		23	1.5	
Registered electors		5,193		
Conservative win (new seat)				
Liberal Democrats win (new seat)				
Green win (new seat)				

=== Wilton & Sherford ===
Wilton & Sherford
Party	Candidate	Votes	%	±%
Liberal Democrats	Alan Wedderkopp	692	68.4	
Conservative	Patrick Berry*	320	31.6	
Majority		372	36.8	
Turnout		1,031	49.1	
Rejected ballots		19	1.8	
Registered electors		2,098		
Liberal Democrats win (new seat)				

=== Wiveliscombe & District ===
Wiveliscombe & District (2 seats)
Party	Candidate	Votes	%	±%
Green	Dave Mansell*	1,070	59.1	
Independent	Mark Blaker	893	49.3	
Conservative	Christopher Chanter	430	23.8	
Conservative	Phillip Thorne	383	21.2	
Liberal Democrats	Danny Clark-Lowes	318	17.6	
Independent	Bryn Wilson	248	13.7	
Majority		463	25.6	
Turnout		1,824	45.0	
Rejected ballots		14	0.8	
Registered electors		4,050		
Green win (new seat)				
Independent win (new seat)				

== Changes 2019–2023 ==
- In 2020, Sue Buller left the Liberal Democrat group and sat as an independent councillor.
- In February 2021, Marcus Barr, who had been elected as an independent, rejoined the Conservatives.
- In May 2021, Marcus Kravis left the Liberal Democrat group to sit as a non-aligned councillor. He had rejoined the Liberal Democrats by October 2021.
- In April 2022, Chris Morgan left the Conservatives to sit as a non-aligned councillor. He returned to the party in September 2022.
- On 28 October 2022, Conservative councillor Anthony Trollope-Bellew died after falling from a vehicle on his land at the edge of the Quantock Hills. No by-election was held because the council was to be abolished in April 2023.
- On 1 December 2022, Liberal Democrat councillor Danny Wedderkopp resigned from the council; his seat was also left vacant until abolition.
- By February 2023, Martin Peters had left the Liberal Democrat group and joined Labour.
- On 1 April 2023, Somerset West and Taunton District Council was abolished and its functions passed to the new unitary Somerset Council.

=== By-elections ===
==== Vivary ====
The by-election was triggered by the resignation of Conservative councillor Catherine Herbert, who stood down for personal reasons.

Vivary by-election, 19 September 2019
Party	Candidate	Votes	%	±%
Liberal Democrats	Derek Perry	648	55.3	+21.0
Conservative	Sharon Fussell	307	26.2	−1.9
Independent	Neil Rudram	155	13.2	+13.2
Labour	Robert Noakes	32	2.7	−9.9
Green	Marguerite Paffard	30	2.6	+2.6
Majority		341	29.1	
Turnout		1,176	32.10	
Rejected ballots		4	0.3	
Registered electors		3,664		
Liberal Democrats gain from Conservative		Swing		

==== Norton Fitzwarren & Staplegrove ====
The death of independent councillor Jean Adkins caused this by-election.

Norton Fitzwarren & Staplegrove by-election, 3 October 2019
Party	Candidate	Votes	%	±%
Liberal Democrats	Andrew Sully	686	53.7	+17.6
Conservative	Rod Williams	493	38.6	+21.2
Green	Alan Debenham	67	5.2	−13.3
Labour	Michael McGuffie	31	2.4	−5.1
Majority		193	15.1	
Turnout			25.9	
Liberal Democrats gain from Independent		Swing		

==== Trull, Pitminster & Corfe ====
Liberal Democrat councillor Martin Hill's resignation led to this by-election.

Trull, Pitminster & Corfe by-election, 6 May 2021
Party	Candidate	Votes	%	±%
Liberal Democrats	Dawn Johnson	781	55.5	+7.1
Conservative	John Thorne	583	41.4	+7.0
Labour	Samuel Booker	44	3.1	−6.6
Majority		198	14.1	
Turnout		1,417	50.52	
Rejected ballots		9	0.6	
Registered electors		2,805		
Liberal Democrats hold		Swing		

==== Old Cleeve & District ====
This by-election was held after Liberal Democrat councillor Peter Pilkington resigned for personal reasons.

Old Cleeve & District by-election, 17 June 2021
Party	Candidate	Votes	%	±%
Liberal Democrats	Stephen Griffiths	500	44.9	−0.6
Conservative	Martin Dewdney	494	44.3	+11.1
Independent	Richard Lillis	120	10.8	−15.1
Majority		6	0.5	
Turnout		1,120	28	
Rejected ballots		6	0.5	
Registered electors		4,042		
Liberal Democrats hold		Swing		

==== North Curry & Ruishton ====
The by-election was called following the resignation of Liberal Democrat councillor Philip Stone, who left in protest at the way the council's leadership was organised.

North Curry & Ruishton by-election, 24 June 2021
Party	Candidate	Votes	%	±%
Liberal Democrats	Barrie Hall	798	49.6	−26.3
Conservative	Thomas Linnell	678	42.1	+16.7
Green	Catherine Parmenter	133	8.3	N/A
Majority		120	7.5	
Turnout		1,610	37.14	
Rejected ballots		1	0.1	
Registered electors		4,335		
Liberal Democrats hold		Swing		

==== Wilton & Sherford ====
The death of Liberal Democrat councillor Alan Wedderkopp, at the age of 89, triggered this by-election.

Wilton & Sherford by-election, 7 October 2021
Party	Candidate	Votes	%	±%
Liberal Democrats	Thomas Deakin	489	56.9	−11.5
Conservative	Alberta Harmon	314	36.5	+4.9
Green	Frances Hicks	57	6.6	N/A
Majority		175	20.3	
Turnout		863	40	
Rejected ballots		3	0.3	
Registered electors		2,154		
Liberal Democrats hold		Swing	▼8.2	

==== Alcombe ====
Independent councillor Paul Bolton was disqualified after the council said he had not attended a meeting for six months, leading to this by-election.

Alcombe by-election, 10 February 2022
Party	Candidate	Votes	%	±%
Liberal Democrats	Nicole Hawkins	259	50.2	+17.7
Conservative	Craig Coleman	223	43.2	+24.2
Labour	Shanti Roos	21	4.1	−6.7
Independent	Richard Lillis	13	2.5	N/A
Majority		36	7.0	
Turnout		518	25.57	
Rejected ballots		2	0.4	
Registered electors		2,026		
Liberal Democrats gain from Independent		Swing	▼3.3	
