= Independents for Frome =

Political grouping in Frome, England

- Leader: Richard Ackroyd
- Founded: 2011
- Headquarters: Frome
- Political position: Localism; Conservation
- Slogan: I'm for Frome
- Frome Town council seats: 16 / 17

Website
- www.independentsforfrome.co.uk/

Independents for Frome (ifF) is a local political grouping based in Frome, Somerset, UK. It is known for its independent and non party-political approach and for its espousal of a series of ideas that have become known as "flatpack democracy". Independent councillors elected under the banner of ifF have been in control of Frome Town Council since 2011.

Independents for Frome's development of the town council has been credited with being the 'crucible' of a new independent approach to local government, and is reported as having been directly responsible for the election successes of a number of similarly independent groups elsewhere in England.

The grouping, and the way in which it has run the town council since 2011, has been the focus of several academic research studies. One study reviewed how the council has used techniques of normative social influence to increase political diversity. Others have assessed its wider importance, concluding that Frome is becoming increasingly renowned for its thriving independent political and economic identity, and that it is becoming a mentor for other places that seek to replicate conditions for independent, post-party politics.

== Establishment ==
Independents for Frome was established in January 2011 by a group of Frome residents who had become disenchanted with what they considered the institutional wrangling and party-political self-interests within the town council, and the extent to which the controlling party-based politicians had become walled in by bureaucracy and protocol.

A decision was made to field candidates for all the seats on the council at the 2011 local elections under a new non-partisan independent grouping, politically diverse but unified by a common set of values including a codified way of working that acknowledged the inevitability of disagreement, and an understanding that there would be no whipping on council votes.

The group was immediately successful, taking 10 of the available 17 seats and thus control of the town council.

== Flatpack democracy and its influences ==
The ideas that lead to the establishment of Independents for Frome were described as "flatpack democracy" by Peter Macfadyen, one of the group's founders and first town councillors. In 2014 the ideas were developed in book form as Flatpack Democracy: A DIY Guide to Independent Politics. Flatpack democracy was reported in 2015 as having been directly responsible for the election successes of similarly independent groups in Arlesey, Bedfordshire and in Buckfastleigh, Devon. A further book, Flatpack Democracy 2.0: Powertools for reclaiming local politics, followed in September 2019.

Independents for Frome's flatpack democracy approach has been credited with being the 'crucible' of a new independent approach to local government. Local successes were reported by 2019 in places in South-West England, Yorkshire and County Durham, and in New Zealand. Specific examples in addition to Buckfastleigh include Dartmouth, Devon, Queen's Park, London and Alderley Edge, Cheshire.

== Academic studies ==
There have been several academic studies that focus on Independents for Frome.

In 2019, Amy Burnett of the University of Reading completed her PhD study of the town and its local politics following the election of Independents for Frome councillors in 2011. Burnett found that ifF had cultivated a new identity that was not previously reflected by local politics and organisations. Its projection of Frome's independence as a self-sufficient market town, framed around sustainability issues, created a strong level of identity in some of the survey respondents, and the group's relocalisation and independent politics generated a self-identity that has filtered the type of person attracted to the town. ifF's success at cultivating diversity and welcoming of different perspectives could, the author argued, be well placed for replication at the national level.

In June 2020 Emil Husted of the Copenhagen Business School published research analysing how Independents for Frome has made use of normative control techniques to reduce homogenizing norms.

In March 2021 Burnett and Richard Nunes, also from the University of Reading, published a journal article reporting the results of an in-depth study of Independents for Frome and its flatpack democracy model. They considered ifF to be a "notable example of a potential political 'transition' where local voters rejected adversarial party-politics" and they argued that Frome's case is important in that the key protagonists were a group of independent councillors seeking to encourage inclusion and diversity.

The authors reported evidence that ifF has contributed to an increase in local political engagement, and argued that a growing interest in the concepts of flatpack democracy nationally may be behind an unprecedented rise in the number of independent councillors elected at town and district level in the 2019 English local elections. Elected representatives of several different local government tiers are, they stated, turning to independent non-partisan policies as a means of cultivating a shift in local politics.

Burnett and Nunes concluded that Frome is becoming increasingly renowned for its thriving independent political and economic identity, and that it is becoming a mentor for other places that seek to replicate conditions for independent, post-party politics.

== Electoral performance history ==
=== Frome town council elections, 2011 ===
Party	Members elected
Conservative	2
Liberal Democrats	5*
ifF	10
Total	17

*One of the Liberal Democrat councillors defected to UKIP prior to the 2015 election.

=== Frome town council elections, 2015 ===
At the town council elections on 7 May 2015, Independents for Frome contested and won all seventeen available seats.

Party	Members elected
ifF	17
Total	17

=== Frome town council elections, 2019 ===
At the town council elections on 2 May 2019, Independents for Frome again contested and won all seventeen available seats.

Party	Members elected
ifF	17
Total	17

=== Frome town council elections, 2022 ===
At the town council elections on 5 May 2022, Independents for Frome won all seventeen available seats (only 1 seat was contested).

Party	Members elected
ifF	17
Total	17

=== Frome town council: Park ward by-election, 2026 ===
On the 10 February 2026, a by-election was held in the Park ward following the resignation of incumbent Independents for Frome councilor, Max Wide. The Independents for Frome candidate placed second overall.

Park ward by-election 10 February 2026
Party	Candidate	Votes	%	±%
Liberal Democrats	Richard Pinnock	255	43.4	+43.4
ifF	Grace Harper	249	42.3	−57.7
Conservative	Dawn Denton	84	14.3	+14.3
Majority		6	1.0	
Turnout		588	18.9	
Liberal Democrats gain from ifF		Swing	43.4	
