= List of sporting events in Belgrade =

Belgrade, the capital of Serbia, has been host to many important sport events in its history. Some of them include:

- 1932 European Rowing Championships
- 1939 Belgrade Grand Prix
- 1953 nine-pin bowling World Championships
- EuroBasket Women 1954
- 1957 World Women's Handball Championship
- EuroBasket 1961
- 1961 European Amateur Boxing Championships
- 1962 European Athletics Championships
- 1963 European Men's Artistic Gymnastics Championships
- 1969 European Indoor Games (track & field)
- 1970 Mr. Universe
- 1973 European Cup Final (football)
- 1973 World Aquatics Championships
- 1973 World Women's Handball Championship
- 1973 European Amateur Boxing Championships
- EuroBasket 1975
- 1975 Men's European Volleyball Championship
- 1975 Women's European Volleyball Championship
- 1976 European Football Championship
- 1977 FIBA European Champions Cup Final (basketball)
- 1978 World Amateur Boxing Championships
- 1979 FIBA Korać Cup Final (basketball)
- 1980 European Weightlifting Championships
- 1986 Men's European Judo Championships
- Belgrade Marathon (annually since 1988) and Belgrade Race Through History (started 1996)
- 1989 World Judo Championships
- Fischer–Spassky (1992 match)
- W.A.K.O. European Championships 1996
- 1998 FIBA EuroCup Final (basketball)
- 1998 European Karate Championships
- W.A.K.O. World Championships 2001 (Belgrade)
- 2003 European Wrestling Championships
- 2004 FIBA Diamond Ball
- EuroBasket 2005
- 2005 European Volleyball Championship
- 2006 European Water Polo Championship (men and women)
- 2007 European Judo Championships
- 2007 European Youth Olympic Festival
- 2007 European Table Tennis Championships
- W.A.K.O. World Championships 2007 (Belgrade)
- 2008 World University Taekwondo Championships
- 2009 Summer Universiade
- 2009 World Volleyball League Finals
- 2010 World Karate Championships
- 2010 Davis Cup finals
- 2011 Women's European Volleyball Championship
- 2011 European Shooting Championships
- 2011 World Shotgun Championships
- 2011 Canoe Sprint European Championships
- 2012 European Handball Championship (men and women)
- 2012 European Wrestling Championships
- 2013 LEN Champions League Final Four
- 2013 World Women's Handball Championship
- 2013 Davis Cup finals
- 2013 European Individual Chess Championship for women
- 2014 FILA Veterans Freestyle and Greco-Roman Wrestling Championship
- 2014 European Rowing Championships
- 2016 European Water Polo Championship (men and women)
- UEFA Futsal Euro 2016
- 2017 European Athletics Indoor Championships
- 2018 EuroLeague Final Four
- 2018 Canoe Sprint European Championships
- EuroBasket Women 2019
- 2020 European Taekwondo Championships
- 2021 AIBA World Boxing Championships
- 2021 LEN Champions League Final Eight
- 2022 LEN Champions League Final Eight
- 2022 World Athletics Indoor Championships
- 2023 LEN Champions League Final Eight
- 2025 World Junior Ice Hockey Championships – Division II B
- 2026 World Junior Ice Hockey Championships – Division II B
