= 1988 World Ninepin Bowling Classic Championships =

European bowling competition

17th World Ninepin Bowling Classic Championships
- Host city: Budapest
- Country: Hungary
- Nations: 12
- Athletes: 161
- Sport: 9-pins
- Events: 6
- Opening: May 17, 1988
- Closing: May 20, 1988

The 1988 World Ninepin Bowling Classic Championships was the seventeenth edition of the championships and was held in Budapest, Hungary, from 17 to 20 May 1988.

In the men's competition the title was won by Hungary in the team competition, Boris Urbanc and Nikola Dragaš (Yugoslavia) in the pair competition and by Boris Urbanc (Yugoslavia) in the singles. In the women's competition the title was won by Yugoslavia in the team competition, Naděžda Dobešová and Daniela Žďárková (Czechoslovakia) in the pair competition and by Marianna Török (Hungary) in the singles.

== Participating teams ==
=== Men ===
- Austria
- Bulgaria
- Czechoslovakia
- Denmark
- France
- Hungary
- Italy
- Romania
- Poland
- Sweden
- West Germany
- Yugoslavia

=== Women ===
- Austria
- Bulgaria
- Czechoslovakia
- Denmark
- Hungary
- Italy
- Romania
- Poland
- Sweden
- West Germany
- Yugoslavia

== Results ==
=== Men - team ===
The competition was played with 200 balls (100 all, 100 clean).
Teams were composed of 6 competitors and the scores were added up.

Rank	Team	Result			
Rank	Team	All	Clear	X	Total
1st place, gold medalist(s)	Hungary; Béla Csányi; József Mészáros; Lajos Németh; Miklós Makkai; László Mráz; Pál Madák; László Nagy (R)	3548; 602; 620; 572; 567; 602; 585	1905; 342; 312; 324; 276; 331; 320	6; 0; 1; 1; 2; 2; 0	5453; 944; 932; 896; 843; 933; 905
2nd place, silver medalist(s)	West Germany; Günter Baumer; Jürgen Fleischer; Ralf Koch; Christian Schwarz; Siegfried Waeber; Ludwig Keller; Werner Stößel (R)	3594; 600; 574; 625; 594; 590; 611	1832; 308; 316; 304; 291; 287; 326	9; 2; 2; 2; 1; 1; 1	5426; 908; 890; 929; 885; 877; 937
3rd place, bronze medalist(s)	Yugoslavia; Vladimir Galjanić; Boris Urbanc; Matjaž Hočevar ( (substituted in) Darko Bizjak); Nikola Dragaš; Miloš Milivojević; Damir Fučkar	3543; 605; 617; 566; 593; 596; 566	1780; 275; 321; 270; 312; 300; 302	17; 5; 0; 5; 1; 4; 2	5323; 880; 938; 836; 905; 896; 868
4	Czechoslovakia; Josef Bartoš; Jozef Kríž; Jozef Pešta; Zdenĕk Procházka; Jaroslav Slabák; Vojtech Vitkovič; Josef Něnička (R)	3489; 565; 597; 605; 553; 566; 603	1800; 291; 309; 291; 336; 280; 293	14; 0; 2; 4; 3; 2; 3	5289; 856; 906; 896; 889; 846; 896
5	Romania; Stelian Boariu; Silviu Belivaca; Vasja Donos; Costică Frigea; Ilie Hosu; Ernö Gergely; Sandor Székely (R)	3555; 590; 618; 563; 606; 590; 588	1718; 282; 277; 281; 298; 294; 286	8; 2; 2; 1; 1; 2; 0	5273; 872; 895; 844; 904; 884; 874
6	Austria; Andreas Dobias; Erwin Doszpod; Thomas Löscher; Peter Pezel; Gerhard Pracser; Franz Wendl; Hubert Supper (R)	3472; 615; 572; 549; 584; 580; 572	1792; 321; 318; 272; 293; 280; 308	16; 0; 4; 6; 2; 2; 2	5264; 936; 890; 821; 877; 860; 880
7	Italy; Christian Gruber; Alois Gruber; Hans Blaas; Alois Hofer; Walter Unteregger; Ludwig Meßner; Hubert Hofer (R)	3390; 558; 550; 566; 562; 588; 566	1698; 258; 288; 308; 311; 264; 269	24; 6; 3; 6; 2; 4; 3	5088; 816; 838; 874; 873; 852; 835
8	Sweden; Juha Kuosmanen; Raimo Kuosmanen; Roger Nilsson; Stefan Olsson; Håkan Pergelius; Håkan Strömberg; Lennart Karlsson (R)	3476; 566; 579; 589; 615; 592; 535	1571; 221; 275; 294; 275; 246; 260	20; 8; 1; 2; 4; 3; 2	5047; 787; 854; 883; 890; 838; 795
9	Poland; Marek Krawczyk; Krzysztof Kamiński; Janusz Adamczak; Roman Żarna; Sylwester Zieliński; Kazimierz Kulbacki; Jerzy Szulc (R)	3349; 590; 568; 545; 546; 544; 556	1655; 270; 306; 269; 246; 282; 282	33; 5; 4; 4; 7; 6; 7	5004; 860; 874; 814; 792; 826; 838
10	France; Christian Hoferer; Jean-Marie Boux; Jean-Marc Bertsch; Gérard Janus; Jean-Jacques Forcht; Laurent Perret; Gérard Brisse (R)	3401; 556; 578; 548; 563; 589; 567	1602; 268; 260; 240; 236; 286; 312	35; 4; 7; 2; 11; 6; 5	5003; 824; 838; 788; 799; 875; 879
11	Denmark; Finn Madsen; Kaj Lindstrom; Bent Ole Gad; Keld Andersen; Jens Rasmussen; Michael Jensen; John Jensen (R)	3334; 542; 584; 570; 568; 552; 518	1478; 242; 247; 233; 254; 251; 251	56; 7; 8; 16; 5; 8; 12	4812; 784; 831; 803; 822; 803; 769
12	Bulgaria; Kiril Stanoev; Konstantin Nikolov; Dimitar Kristov; Dimitar Arnavdov; Botio Koritarov; Krastio Palasev; Petko Petkov (R)	3289; 544; 528; 533; 584; 540; 560	1367; 244; 222; 219; 212; 219; 251	69; 9; 11; 14; 19; 10; 6	4656; 788; 750; 752; 796; 759; 811

=== Women - team ===
The competition was played with 100 balls (50 all, 50 clean).
Teams were composed of 6 competitors and the scores were added up.

Rank	Team	Result			
Rank	Team	All	Clear	X	Total
1st place, gold medalist(s)	Yugoslavia; Marika Kardinar-Nagy; Štefica Krištof; Biserka Perman; Margit Tot; Olivera Busija; Jožica Šeško; Vesna Žunek (R)	1708; 289; 303; 284; 267; 278; 287	850; 141; 126; 151; 132; 148; 152	15; 0; 3; 2; 4; 3; 3	2558; 430; 429; 435; 399; 426; 439
2nd place, silver medalist(s)	Czechoslovakia; Naděžda Dobešová; Hana Gajová; Gabriela Kuchárová; Anna Martišková; Růžena Smrčková; Daniela Žďárková; Zdena Vytisková (R)	1706; 280; 289; 296; 284; 279; 278	843; 166; 109; 134; 134; 161; 139	14; 0; 7; 3; 2; 0; 2	2549; 446; 398; 430; 418; 440; 417
3rd place, bronze medalist(s)	West Germany; Gabriele Bergholz; Gudrun Beier; Cornelia Lachman; Anita Walz; Heike Zahn; Karin Zipf; Hildegard Pichler (R)	1701; 279; 286; 287; 269; 278; 302	820; 120; 143; 123; 152; 133; 149	17; 4; 4; 1; 4; 2; 2	2521; 399; 429; 410; 421; 411; 451
4	Hungary; Erika Vecseri; Marianna Török; Istvánné Németh; Zsuzsanna Szöke; Ferencné Hudomiet; Györgyné Vidács; Ágota Kovácsné Grampsch (R)	1676; 293; 278; 269; 273; 277; 286	825; 154; 159; 125; 125; 141; 121	15; 0; 0; 8; 1; 1; 5	2501; 447; 437; 394; 398; 418; 407
5	Romania; Mária Zsizsik; Adriana Antonesei; Elena Andreescu; Elena Birnaz; Liliana Bejenaru; Deina Tagean; Viorica Botezatu (R)	1633; 268; 283; 271; 258; 261; 292	983; 140; 134; 137; 141; 261; 170	18; 2; 4; 5; 3; 3; 1	2616; 408; 417; 408; 399; 522; 462
6	Austria; Gabriella Tusch; Eva-Maria Birsach; Heidelinde Wolf; Katalin Nove; Eveline Besta; Christine Pracser; Hildegard Strele (R)	1627; 275; 277; 265; 265; 272; 273	785; 140; 135; 117; 139; 138; 116	18; 1; 2; 4; 1; 4; 6	2412; 415; 412; 382; 404; 410; 389
7	Poland; Bogumiła Górczak; Karolina Galińska; Agata Banaszak; Maria Waszak; Alicja Włodarczak; Beata Górczak; Dorota Włodarczak (R)	1623; 282; 265; 265; 277; 269; 265	742; 113; 107; 131; 124; 135; 132	25; 4; 6; 5; 4; 4; 2	2365; 395; 372; 396; 401; 404; 397
8	Bulgaria; Sofia Koteva; Konstandinka Nikolova; Letizia Mihailova; Zornica Jordanova; Albena Kostova; Ani Gueorguieva; Emilia Mihailova (R)	1618; 285; 279; 258; 253; 271; 272	695; 129; 114; 112; 92; 125; 123	23; 2; 1; 3; 10; 5; 2	2313; 414; 393; 370; 345; 396; 395
9	Sweden; Lillemor Dahlström; Lena Jakobsson; Chris Jonsson; Lena Karlsson; Ann-Britt Karlsson; Karin Carlson; Mikaela Petterson (R)	1615; 269; 267; 279; 274; 269; 257	693; 98; 102; 116; 122; 141; 114	42; 7; 11; 8; 4; 6; 6	2308; 367; 369; 395; 396; 410; 371
10	Italy; Christa Wiedenhofer; Cilly Ploner; Monika Aufderklamm; Maria Gufler; Herta Köhlgruber; Laura Andreasi; Frida Kerschbaumer (R)	1601; 270; 272; 255; 263; 271; 270	694; 117; 140; 98; 104; 132; 103	48; 9; 0; 13; 8; 9; 9	2295; 387; 412; 353; 367; 403; 373
11	Denmark; Gudrun Jensen; Alice Krogh; Jette Stougaard; Anette Jensen; Kristem Bajlun; Yvonne Helvig; Carina Norregaard (R)	1569; 255; 266; 281; 255; 266; 246	599; 96; 124; 105; 86; 103; 85	72; 13; 7; 12; 15; 9; 16	2168; 351; 390; 386; 341; 369; 331

=== Men - pair ===
Rank	Team	Result			
Rank	Team	All	Clear	X	Total
1st place, gold medalist(s)	Yugoslavia; Boris Urbanc; Nikola Dragaš	1225; 617; 608	626; 320; 306	4; 2; 2	1851; 937; 914
2nd place, silver medalist(s)	Austria; Gerhard Pracser; Andreas Dobias	1193; 607; 586	634; 308; 326	3; 2; 1	1827; 915; 912
3rd place, bronze medalist(s)	West Germany; Ralf Koch; Ludwig Keller	1201; 606; 595	622; 309; 313	2; 2; 0	1823; 915; 908
4	Hungary; Pál Madák; László Nagy	1179; 580; 599	642; 316; 326	2; 1; 1	1821; 896; 925
5	Romania; Stelian Boariu; Ilie Hosu	1178; 601; 577	640; 326; 314	5; 3; 2	1818; 927; 891
6	Hungary; Béla Csányi; József Mészáros	1186; 584; 602	626; 324; 302	3; 1; 2	1812; 908; 904
7	Czechoslovakia; Josef Kríž; Jozef Pešta	1181; 596; 585	629; 316; 313	0; 0; 0	1810; 912; 898
8	Czechoslovakia; Zděnek Procházka; Vojtech Vitkovič	1187; 602; 585	604; 322; 282	7; 2; 5	1791; 924; 867
9	Yugoslavia; Vladimir Galjanić; Miloš Milivojević	1180; 590; 590	584; 294; 290	4; 3; 1	1764; 884; 880
10	Romania; Costica Frigea; Ernö Gergely	1196; 607; 589	564; 256; 308	9; 6; 3	1760; 863; 897
11	Hungary; Lajos Németh; László Mráz	1158; 573; 585	598; 302; 296	3; 0; 3	1756; 875; 881
12	West Germany; Günter Baumer; Werner Stößel	1160; 580; 580	590; 284; 306	9; 5; 4	1750; 864; 886
13	West Germany; Jürgen Fleischer; Christian Schwarz	1160; 577; 583	585; 285; 300	4; 3; 1	1745; 862; 883
14	Sweden; Roger Nilsson; Raimo Kuosmannen	1162; 611; 551	576; 291; 285	14; 7; 7	1738; 902; 836
15	Yugoslavia; Matjaž Hočevar; Damir Fučkar	1153; 563; 590	579; 294; 285	2; 1; 1	1732; 857; 875
16	Austria; Hubert Supper; Peter Pezel	1142; 577; 565	584; 292; 292	0; 0; 0	1726; 869; 857
17	France; Christian Hoferer; Jean-Marc Bertsch	1166; 600; 566	554; 249; 305	4; 4; 0	1720; 849; 871
18	Austria; Franz Wendl; Erwin Doszpod	1134; 566; 568	553; 279; 274	8; 2; 6	1687; 845; 842
19	Czechoslovakia; Josef Něnička; Jozef Bartoš	1077; 544; 533	501; 246; 255	24; 11; 13	1578; 790; 788
20	Sweden; Håkan Pergelius; Stefan Olsson	1128; 564; 564	547; 293; 254	9; 5; 4	1675; 857; 818
21	Denmark; Finn Madsen; Kaj Lindström	1140; 579; 561	523; 256; 267	11; 5; 6	1663; 835; 828
22	Romania; Silviu Belivaca; Sándor Székely	1135; 573; 562	527; 282; 245	8; 6; 2	1662; 855; 807
23	Italy; Ludwig Meßner; Christian Gruber	1092; 545; 547	566; 282; 284	6; 3; 3	1658; 827; 831
24	Poland; Marek Krawczyk; Krzysztof Kamiński	1105; 567; 538	541; 269; 272	15; 8; 7	1646; 836; 810
25	France; Gérard Brisse; Gérard Janus	1130; 555; 575	516; 247; 269	15; 8; 7	1646; 802; 844
26	Italy; Hans Blaas; Alois Hofer	1116; 566; 550	528; 270; 258	10; 8; 2	1644; 836; 808
27	Poland; Roman Żarna; Kazimierz Kulbacki	1119; 556; 563	525; 249; 276	10; 4; 6	1644; 805; 839
28	Poland; Janusz Adamczak; Sylwester Zieliński	1096; 560; 536	540; 284; 256	14; 5; 9	1636; 844; 792
29	Bulgaria; Krastio Palasev; Dimitar Arnavdov	1149; 570; 579	477; 239; 238	15; 6; 9	1626; 809; 817
30	Sweden; Juha Kuosmannen; Lennart Karlsson	1098; 559; 539	526; 278; 248	12; 8; 4	1624; 837; 787
31	Bulgaria; Konstantin Nikolov; Kiril Stanoev	1099; 540; 559	519; 261; 258	12; 5; 7	1618; 801; 817
32	France; Jean-Jacques Forcht; Laurent Perret	1092; 540; 552	489; 273; 216	17; 6; 11	1581; 813; 768
33	Italy; Herbert Hofer; Walter Unteregger	1081; 558; 523	498; 234; 264	16; 8; 8	1579; 792; 787
34	Denmark; Bent Ole Gad; Keld Andersen	1089; 546; 543	480; 228; 252	20; 11; 9	1569; 774; 795
35	Bulgaria; Petko Petkov; Botio Koritarov	1105; 541; 564	457; 229; 228	29; 16; 13	1562; 770; 792
36	Denmark; Jens Rasmussen; John Jensen	1052; 552; 500	481; 290; 191	32; 11; 21	1533; 842; 691

=== Women - pair ===
Rank	Team	Result			
Rank	Team	All	Clear	X	Total
1st place, gold medalist(s)	Czechoslovakia; Naděžda Dobešová; Daniela Žďárková	570; 292; 278	311; 147; 164	0; 0; 0	881; 439; 442
2nd place, silver medalist(s)	Hungary; Ferencné Hudomiet; Ágota Kovácsné Grampsch	590; 294; 296	285; 145; 140	3; 1; 2	875; 439; 436
3rd place, bronze medalist(s)	Yugoslavia; Vesna Žunek; Olivera Busija	586; 315; 271	269; 125; 144	7; 6; 1	855; 440; 415
4	Hungary; Marianna Török; Erika Vecseri	568; 278; 290	281; 159; 122	2; 0; 2	849; 437; 412
5	West Germany; Cornelia Lachmann; Gudrun Beier	550; 263; 287	291; 134; 157	12; 6; 6	841; 397; 444
6	Austria; Katalin Nove; Gabriella Tusch	570; 287; 283	263; 130; 133	3; 2; 1	833; 417; 416
7	Yugoslavia; Biserka Perman; Štefica Krištof	554; 284; 270	274; 148; 126	5; 3; 2	828; 432; 396
8	Yugoslavia; Marika Kardinar-Nagy; Jožica Šeško	541; 270; 271	285; 142; 143	3; 0; 3	826; 412; 414
9	Romania; Deina Tagean; Elena Andreescu	569; 280; 289	253; 114; 139	3; 2; 1	822; 394; 428
10	West Germany; Karin Zipf; Anita Walz	572; 286; 286	249; 121; 128	10; 3; 7	821; 407; 414
11	Romania; Elena Birnaz; Adriana Antonesei	564; 269; 295	254; 115; 139	4; 0; 4	818; 384; 434
12	Czechoslovakia; Hana Gajová; Gabriela Kuchárová	561; 285; 276	256; 107; 149	4; 3; 1	817; 392; 425
13	Italy; Cilly Ploner; Herta Köhlgruber	564; 287; 277	249; 125; 124	8; 4; 4	813; 412; 401
14	Czechoslovakia; Anna Martišková; Růžena Smrčková	536; 274; 262	265; 122; 143	6; 4; 2	801; 396; 405
15	West Germany; Gabriele Bergholz; Heike Zahn	559; 276; 283	240; 123; 117	7; 2; 5	799; 399; 400
16	Austria; Hildegard Strele; Eveline Besta	547; 270; 277	244; 114; 130	14; 9; 5	791; 384; 407
17	Poland; Beata Górczak; Maria Waszak	548; 266; 282	237; 115; 122	7; 5; 2	785; 381; 404
18	Austria; Christine Pracser; Eva-Maria Birsach	541; 263; 278	242; 108; 134	9; 8; 1	783; 371; 412
19	Bulgaria; Sofia Koteva; Albena Kostova	544; 271; 273	236; 109; 127	10; 6; 4	780; 380; 400
20	Hungary; Istvánné Németh; Györgyné Vidács	555; 262; 293	257; 143; 114	9; 5; 4	812; 405; 407
21	Poland; Alicja Włodarczak; Dorota Włodarczak	533; 271; 262	239; 115; 124	12; 6; 6	772; 386; 386
22	Romania; Mária Zsizsik; Viorica Botezatu	513; 259; 254	247; 124; 123	7; 2; 5	760; 383; 377
23	Sweden; Lena Karlsson; Ann-Britt Karlsson	521; 267; 254	240; 117; 123	9; 4; 5	761; 384; 377
24	Bulgaria; Letizia Mihailova; Zornica Jordanova	532; 265; 267	210; 106; 104	19; 10; 9	742; 371; 371
25	Bulgaria; Konstandinka Nikolova; Ani Gueorguieva	539; 271; 268	202; 104; 98	19; 7; 12	741; 375; 366
26	Poland; Agata Banaszak; Bogumiła Górczak	527; 251; 276	212; 113; 99	14; 7; 7	739; 364; 375
27	Sweden; Mikaela Petterson; Lena Jakobsson	521; 261; 260	212; 106; 106	17; 7; 10	733; 367; 366
28	Denmark; Gudrun Jensen; Alice Krogh	524; 247; 277	209; 112; 97	20; 7; 13	733; 359; 374
29	Sweden; Karin Carlsson; Chris Jonsson	513; 267; 246	218; 103; 115	16; 6; 10	731; 370; 361
30	Italy; Christa Wiedenhofer; Frida Kerschbaumer	517; 252; 265	210; 104; 106	15; 7; 8	727; 356; 371
31	Italy; Maria Gufler; Laura Andreasi	492; 247; 245	223; 102; 121	12; 6; 6	715; 349; 366
32	Denmark; Anette Jensen; Jette Stougaard	505; 234; 271	207; 101; 106	14; 8; 6	712; 335; 377
33	Denmark; Kristem Bajlun; Carina Norregaard	499; 246; 253	184; 96; 88	29; 11; 18	683; 342; 341

=== Men - single ===
20 competitors with the best sum from the start team and pair advanced to the final. The results from the final were added to qualification which decided on the final event order.

Rank	Name	Country	Qualification						Final				Total
Rank	Name	Country	Team	Pair	A	C	X	QT	A	C	X	T	Total
1st place, gold medalist(s)	Boris Urbanc	Yugoslavia	938	937	1234	641	2	1875	607	310	1	917	2792
2nd place, silver medalist(s)	Béla Csányi	Hungary	944	908	1186	666	1	1852	590	321	1	911	2763
3rd place, bronze medalist(s)	József Mészáros	Hungary	932	904	1222	614	3	1836	598	309	0	907	2743
4	Stelian Boariu	Romania	872	927	1191	608	5	1799	604	334	0	938	2737
5	Ludwig Keller	West Germany	937	908	1206	639	1	1845	593	299	1	892	2737
6	Jozef Kríž	Czechoslovakia	906	912	1193	605	2	1818	607	310	1	917	2735
7	Andreas Dobias	Austria	936	912	1201	647	1	1848	579	293	1	872	2720
8	Zdeněk Procházka	Czechoslovakia	889	924	1155	658	5	1813	598	297	1	895	2708
9	Ralf Koch	West Germany	929	915	1231	613	4	1844	578	278	2	856	2700
10	Nikola Dragaš	Yugoslavia	905	914	1201	618	3	1819	582	298	2	880	2699
11	Pál Madák	Hungary	905	896	1165	636	1	1801	575	317	1	892	2693
12	Miloš Milivojević	Yugoslavia	896	880	1186	590	5	1776	590	317	2	907	2683
13	Christian Schwarz	West Germany	885	883	1177	591	2	1768	279	334	1	913	2681
14	László Mráz	Hungary	933	881	1187	627	5	1814	575	291	1	866	2680
15	Jozef Pešta	Czechoslovakia	896	898	1190	604	4	1794	593	285	1	878	2672
16	Gerhard Pracser	Austria	860	915	1187	588	4	1775	586	275	5	861	2636
17	Lajos Németh	Hungary	896	875	1145	626	1	1171	569	280	1	849	2620
18	Roger Nilsson	Sweden	883	902	1200	585	9	1785	542	290	4	832	2617
19	Costică Frigea	Romania	904	863	1213	554	7	1767	563	280	4	843	2610
20	Günter Baumer	West Germany	908	864	1180	592	7	1772	559	276	2	835	2607
21	Ilie Hosu	Romania	884	891	1167	608	4	1775	Withdrawn				
22	Ernö Gergely	Romania	874	897	1177	594	3	1771	Withdrawn				
23	Vladimir Galjanić	Yugoslavia	880	884	1195	569	8	1764	did not advance				
24	Vojtech Vitkovič	Czechoslovakia	896	867	1188	575	8	1763	did not advance				
25	Jürgen Fleischer	West Germany	890	862	1151	601	5	1752	did not advance				
26	Silviu Belivaca	Romania	895	855	1191	559	8	1750	did not advance				
27	Damir Fučkar	Yugoslavia	868	875	1156	587	3	1743	did not advance				
28	Peter Pezel	Austria	877	857	1149	585	2	1734	did not advance				
29	Erwin Doszpod	Austria	890	842	1140	592	10	1732	did not advance				
30	Franz Wendl	Austria	890	845	1138	587	4	1725	did not advance				
31	Hans Blaas	Italy	874	836	1132	578	14	1710	did not advance				
32	Stefan Olsson	Sweden	890	818	1179	529	8	1708	did not advance				
33	Marek Krawczyk	Poland	860	836	1157	539	13	1696	did not advance				
34	Håkan Pergelius	Sweden	838	857	1156	539	8	1695	did not advance				
35	Josef Bartoš	Czechoslovakia	856	835	1130	561	3	1691	did not advance				
36	Raimo Kuosmannen	Sweden	854	836	1130	560	8	1690	did not advance				
37	Jean-Jacques Forcht	France	875	813	1129	559	12	1688	did not advance				
38	Krzysztof Kamiński	Poland	874	810	1106	578	11	1684	did not advance				
39	Alois Hofer	Italy	873	808	1112	569	4	1681	did not advance				
40	Kazimierz Kulbacki	Poland	838	839	1119	558	13	1677	did not advance				
41	Christian Hoferer	France	824	849	1156	517	8	1673	did not advance				
42	Ludwig Meßner	Italy	835	827	1111	551	6	1662	did not advance				
43	Jean-Marc Bertsch	France	768	871	1114	545	2	1659	did not advance				
44	Kaj Lindstrom	Denmark	831	828	1145	514	14	1659	did not advance				
45	Janusz Adamczak	Poland	814	844	1105	553	9	1658	did not advance				
46	Christian Gruber	Italy	816	831	1105	542	9	1647	did not advance				
47	Laurent Perret	France	879	768	1119	528	16	1647	did not advance				
48	Jens Rasmussen	Denmark	803	842	1104	541	19	1645	did not advance				
49	Gérard Janus	France	799	844	1138	505	18	1643	did not advance				
50	Walter Unteregger	Italy	852	787	1111	528	12	1639	did not advance				
51	Juga Kuosmannen	Sweden	787	837	1125	499	16	1624	did not advance				
52	Krastio Palasev	Bulgaria	811	809	1130	490	12	1620	did not advance				
53	Finn Madsen	Denmark	784	835	1121	498	12	1619	did not advance				
54	Sylwester Zieliński	Poland	826	792	1080	538	15	1618	did not advance				
55	Keld Andersen	Denmark	822	795	1111	506	14	1617	did not advance				
56	Dimitar Arnavdov	Bulgaria	796	817	1163	450	28	1613	did not advance				
57	Kiril Stanoev	Bulgaria	788	817	1103	502	16	1605	did not advance				
58	Roman Żarna	Poland	792	805	1102	495	11	1597	did not advance				
59	Bent Ole Gad	Denmark	803	774	1116	461	27	1577	did not advance				
60	Konstantin Nikolov	Bulgaria	750	801	1068	483	16	1551	did not advance				
61	Botio Koritarov	Bulgaria	759	792	1104	447	23	1551	did not advance				
62	Matjaž Hočevar	Yugoslavia	580	857	936	501	4	1437	did not advance				
63	László Nagy	Hungary	—	925	599	326	1	925	did not advance				
64	Werner Stößel	West Germany	—	886	580	306	4	886	did not advance				
65	Siegfried Waeber	West Germany	877	—	590	287	1	877	did not advance				
66	Hubert Supper	Austria	—	869	577	292	0	869	did not advance				
67	Josef Něnička	Czechoslovakia	—	846	562	284	3	846	did not advance				
68	Jaroslav Slabák	Czechoslovakia	846	—	566	280	2	846	did not advance				
69	Vasja Donos	Romania	844	—	563	281	1	844	did not advance				
70	Miklós Makkai	Hungary	843	—	567	276	2	843	did not advance				
71	Alois Gruber	Italy	838	—	550	288	3	838	did not advance				
72	Jean-Marie Boux	France	838	—	578	260	7	838	did not advance				
73	Thomas Löscher	Austria	821	—	549	272	6	821	did not advance				
74	Sandor Székely	Romania	—	807	562	245	2	807	did not advance				
75	Gérard Brisse	France	—	802	555	247	8	802	did not advance				
76	Håkan Strömberg	Sweden	795	—	535	260	2	795	did not advance				
77	Herbert Hofer	Italy	—	792	558	234	8	792	did not advance				
78	Lennart Karlsson	Sweden	—	787	539	248	4	787	did not advance				
79	Petko Petkov	Bulgaria	—	770	541	229	16	770	did not advance				
80	Michael Jensen	Denmark	769	—	518	251	12	769	did not advance				
81	Dimitar Hristov	Bulgaria	752	—	533	219	14	752	did not advance				
82	John Jensen	Denmark	—	691	500	191	21	691	did not advance				
83	Darko Bizjak	Yugoslavia	256	—	193	60	2	256	did not advance				

=== Women - single ===
20 competitors with the best sum from the start team and pair advanced to the final. The results from the final were added to qualification which decided on the final event order.

Rank	Name	Country	Qualification						Final				Total
Rank	Name	Country	Team	Pair	A	C	X	QT	A	C	X	T	Total
1st place, gold medalist(s)	Marianna Torok	Hungary	437	437	556	318	0	874	299	141	5	440	1314
2nd place, silver medalist(s)	Erika Vecseri	Hungary	447	412	583	276	2	859	292	151	1	443	1302
3rd place, bronze medalist(s)	Biserka Perman	Yugoslavia	435	432	568	299	5	867	280	149	0	429	1296
4	Adriana Antonesei	Romania	417	434	578	273	8	851	292	150	2	442	1293
5	Deina Tagean	Romania	462	394	572	284	3	856	269	165	0	434	1290
6	Gudrun Beier	West Germany	429	444	573	300	10	873	277	140	1	417	1290
7	Naděžda Dobešová	Czechoslovakia	446	439	572	313	0	885	280	125	4	403	1290
8	Ferencné Hudomiet	Hungary	418	439	571	286	2	857	280	142	2	422	1279
9	Olivera Busija	Yugoslavia	426	415	549	292	1	841	289	143	1	432	1273
10	Růžena Smrčková	Czechoslovakia	440	405	541	304	2	845	288	132	3	420	1265
11	Karin Zipf	West Germany	451	407	588	270	5	858	285	119	2	404	1262
12	Daniela Žďárková	Czechoslovakia	417	442	556	303	2	859	272	130	1	402	1261
13	Štefica Krištof	Yugoslavia	429	396	573	252	5	825	280	149	0	429	1254
14	Marika Karindar-Nagy	Yugoslavia	430	412	559	283	0	842	278	133	1	411	1253
15	Anita Walz	West Germany	421	414	555	280	11	835	289	128	3	417	1252
16	Jožica Šeško	Yugoslavia	439	414	558	295	6	853	275	122	3	397	1250
17	Gabriela Kuchárová	Czechoslovakia	430	425	572	283	4	855	277	113	7	390	1245
18	Eva-Maria Birsach	Austria	412	412	555	269	3	824	275	144	2	419	1243
19	Elena Andreescu	Romania	408	428	560	276	6	836	278	125	4	403	1239
20	Gabriella Tusch	Austria	415	416	558	273	2	831	264	115	6	379	1210
21	Cilly Ploner	Italy	412	412	559	265	4	824	did not advance				
22	Katalin Nove	Austria	404	417	552	269	3	821	did not advance				
23	Eveline Besta	Austria	410	407	549	268	9	817	did not advance				
24	Anna Martišková	Czechoslovakia	418	396	558	256	6	814	did not advance				
25	Heike Zahn	West Germany	411	400	561	250	7	811	did not advance				
26	Cornelia Lachmann	West Germany	410	397	550	257	7	807	did not advance				
27	Maria Waszak	Poland	401	404	559	246	6	805	did not advance				
28	Herta Kohlgruber	Italy	403	401	548	256	13	804	did not advance				
29	Gabriele Bergholz	West Germany	399	399	555	243	6	798	did not advance				
30	Albena Kostova	Bulgaria	396	400	544	252	9	796	did not advance				
31	Sofia Koteva	Bulgaria	414	380	556	238	8	794	did not advance				
32	Mária Zsizsik	Romania	408	383	527	264	4	791	did not advance				
33	Alicja Włodarczak	Poland	404	386	540	250	10	790	did not advance				
34	Györgyné Vidács	Hungary	407	383	556	234	8	790	did not advance				
35	Hana Gajová	Czechoslovakia	398	392	574	216	10	790	did not advance				
36	Istvánné Németh	Hungary	394	395	542	247	15	789	did not advance				
37	Ann-Brit Karlsson	Sweden	410	377	523	264	11	787	did not advance				
38	Elena Birnaz	Romania	399	384	527	256	3	783	did not advance				
39	Lena Karlsson	Sweden	396	384	541	239	8	780	did not advance				
40	Beata Górczak	Poland	397	381	531	247	7	778	did not advance				
41	Bogumiła Górczak	Poland	395	375	558	212	11	770	did not advance				
42	Kostandinka Nikolova	Bulgaria	393	375	550	218	8	768	did not advance				
43	Alice Krogh	Denmark	390	374	543	221	20	764	did not advance				
44	Jette Stougaard	Denmark	386	377	552	211	18	763	did not advance				
45	Ani Gueorguieva	Bulgaria	395	366	540	221	14	761	did not advance				
46	Agata Banaszak	Poland	396	364	516	244	12	760	did not advance				
47	Christine Pracser	Austria	389	371	536	224	14	760	did not advance				
48	Chris Jonsson	Sweden	395	361	525	231	18	756	did not advance				
49	Christia Wiedenhofer	Italy	387	356	522	221	16	743	did not advance				
50	Letizia Mihailova	Bulgaria	370	371	523	218	13	741	did not advance				
51	Karin Carlson	Sweden	371	370	524	217	12	741	did not advance				
52	Laura Andreasi	Italy	373	366	515	224	15	739	did not advance				
53	Lena Jakobsson	Sweden	369	366	527	208	21	735	did not advance				
54	Maria Gufler	Italy	367	349	510	206	14	716	did not advance				
55	Zornica Jordanova	Bulgaria	345	371	520	196	19	716	did not advance				
56	Kirstem Bajlun	Denmark	369	342	512	199	20	711	did not advance				
57	Gudrun Jensen	Denmark	351	359	502	208	20	710	did not advance				
58	Anette Jensen	Denmark	341	335	489	187	23	676	did not advance				
59	Vesna Žunek	Yugoslavia	—	440	315	125	6	440	did not advance				
60	Ágota Kovácsné Grampsh	Hungary	—	436	296	140	2	436	did not advance				
61	Margit Tot	Yugoslavia	399	—	267	132	4	399	did not advance				
62	Zsuzsanna Szöke	Hungary	398	—	273	125	1	398	did not advance				
63	Liliana Bejenaru	Romania	389	—	261	128	3	389	did not advance				
64	Dorota Włodarczak	Poland	—	386	262	124	6	386	did not advance				
65	Hildegard Strele	Austria	—	384	270	114	9	384	did not advance				
66	Heidelinde Wolf	Austria	382	—	265	117	4	382	did not advance				
67	Viorica Botezatu	Romania	—	378	254	124	0	378	did not advance				
68	Karolina Galińska	Poland	372	—	265	107	6	372	did not advance				
69	Frida Kerschbaumer	Italy	—	371	265	106	8	371	did not advance				
70	Mikaela Petterson	Sweden	—	367	261	106	7	367	did not advance				
71	Lillemor Dahlström	Sweden	367	—	269	98	7	367	did not advance				
72	Monika Aufderklamm	Italy	353	—	255	98	13	353	did not advance				
73	Carina Norregaard	Denmark	—	341	253	88	18	341	did not advance				
74	Yvonne Helvig	Denmark	331	—	246	85	16	331	did not advance				

== Medal summary ==
=== Medal table ===
* Host nation (Host nation)

Rank	Nation	Gold	Silver	Bronze	Total
1	Yugoslavia (YUG)	3	0	3	6
2	Hungary (HUN)*	2	3	1	6
3	Czechoslovakia (TCH)	1	1	0	2
4	West Germany (FRG)	0	1	2	3
5	Austria (AUT)	0	1	0	1
Totals (5 entries)		6	6	6	18

=== Men ===
Event	Gold	Silver	Bronze
Team	Hungary; Béla Csányi; Pál Madák; Miklós Makkai; József Mészáros; László Mráz; László Nagy; Lajos Németh	West Germany; Günter Baumer; Jürgen Fleischer; Ludwig Keller; Ralf Koch; Christian Schwarz; Werner Stossel; Siegfried Waeber	Yugoslavia; Darko Bizjak; Nikola Dragaš; Damir Fučkar; Vladimir Galjanić; Matjaž Hočevar; Miloš Milivojević; Boris Urbanc
Pair	Yugoslavia; Nikola Dragaš; Boris Urbanc	Austria; Andreas Dobias; Gerhard Pracser	West Germany; Ludwig Keller; Ralf Koch
Single	Boris Urbanc; Yugoslavia	Béla Csányi; Hungary	József Mészáros; Hungary

=== Women ===
Event	Gold	Silver	Bronze
Team	Yugoslavia; Olivera Busija; Marika Kardinar-Nagy; Štefica Krištof; Biserka Perman; Jožica Šeško; Margit Tot; Vesna Žunek	Czechoslovakia; Naděžda Dobešová; Hana Gajová; Gabriela Kuchárová; Anna Martišková; Růžena Smrčková; Zdena Vytisková; Daniela Žďárková	West Germany; Gabriele Bergholz; Gudrun Beier; Cornelia Lachman; Hildegard Pichler; Anita Walz; Heike Zahn; Karin Zipf
Pair	Czechoslovakia; Naděžda Dobešová; Daniela Žďárková	Hungary; Ferencné Hudomiet; Ágota Kovácsné Grampsch	Yugoslavia; Olivera Busija; Vesna Žunek
Single	Marianna Török; Hungary	Erika Vecseri; Hungary	Biserka Perman; Yugoslavia
