= World Ninepin Bowling Classic Championships =

European bowling competition

- Status: inactive
- Genre: sporting event
- Date: varying
- Frequency: biennial
- Location: Europe
- Country: varying
- Inaugurated: 1953
- Most recent: 2004
- Organiser: WNBA NBC
- Website: www.wnba-nbc.com

The World Ninepin Bowling Classic Championships were a biennial nine-pin bowling competition organized by the World Ninepin Bowling Association. The World Championships was started in 1953 and took place every two years until 1959. The next competition was in 1962 with the assumption of alternating with the European Championships every two years. In 1966, this concept was abandoned and thereafter the championships were biennial until 2004.

Since 2005, the competition has been divided. Team events are held in odd years, while singles events are in even years.

The following list shows when new events were added for the first time:

- 1953, singles and team events as first events.
- 1966, pair competitions were added.
- 1990, combination competitions were added.
- 1994, separation of team competition into two divisions A and B.
- 2004, sprint and mixed tandem competitions added. An individual event on a distance of 120 throws for the first time.

== List of championships ==
| Edition | Year | City | Country | Date | Events | Top of the medal table | Notes |
|---|---|---|---|---|---|---|---|
| 1st | 1953 | Belgrade | Yugoslavia | 21 - 24 Jun | 4 | Austria | |
| 2nd | 1955 | Essen | West Germany | 30 Aug – 5 Sep | 4 | East Germany | |
| 3rd | 1957 | Vienna | Austria | 9 – 14 Jun | 4 | Austria | |
| 4th | 1959 | Bautzen | East Germany | 22 - 27 Sep | 4 | East Germany | |
| 5th | 1962 | Bratislava | Czechoslovakia | 24 – 29 Sep | 4 | Czechoslovakia | |
| 6th | 1966 | Bucharest | Romania | 19 – 25 Jun | 6 | Romania | First with pair |
| 7th | 1968 | Linz | Austria (2) | 9 – 15 Jun | 6 | East Germany | |
| 8th | 1970 | Bolzano | Italy | 24 – 30 May | 6 | Romania | |
| 9th | 1972 | Split | Yugoslavia (2) | 27 May – 4 Jun | 6 | Romania | |
| 10th | 1974 | Eppelheim | West Germany (2) | 17 – 23 May | 6 | Romania | |
| 11th | 1976 | Vienna (2) | Austria (3) | 14 - 20 May | 6 | Yugoslavia | |
| 12th | 1978 | Lucerne | Switzerland | 20 - 26 May | 6 | Romania | |
| 13th | 1980 | Mangalia | Romania (2) | 24 - 30 May | 6 | Romania | |
| 14th | 1982 | Brno | Czechoslovakia (2) | 4 - 11 Jun | 6 | Yugoslavia | |
| 15th | 1984 | Ljubljana | Yugoslavia (3) | 27 May - 1 Jun | 6 | Hungary | |
| 16th | 1986 | Munich | West Germany (3) | 18 - 26 May | 6 | Hungary | |
| 17th | 1988 | Budapest | Hungary | 17 - 20 May | 6 | Yugoslavia | |
| 18th | 1990 | Innsbruck | Austria (4) | 20 - 26 May | 8 | Hungary | First with combination |
| 19th | 1992 | Bratislava (2) | Czechoslovakia (3) | 17 - 23 May | 8 | Slovenia | |
| 20th | 1994 | Ludwigshafen | Germany | 15 - 22 May | 10 | Czech Republic | First with the division of teams into two groups |
| 21st | 1996 | Prague | Czech Republic (4) | 19 - 25 May | 10 | FR Yugoslavia | |
| 22nd | 1998 | Celje | Slovenia | 9 - 15 May | 10 | Germany | |
| 23rd | 2000 | Poznań | Poland | 14 - 20 May | 8 | Germany | |
| 24th | 2002 | Osijek | Croatia | 19 - 25 May | 8 | Germany | |
| 25th | 2004 | Brașov | Romania (3) | 15 - 22 May | 11 | Germany | First with sprint and mixed tandem. Individual on distance 120 throws. |
Since 2005 separated into Singles and Team Championships.

== Medal count ==
| Rank | Nation | Gold | Silver | Bronze | Total |
|---|---|---|---|---|---|
| 1 | Hungary | 28 | 34 | 23 | 85 |
| 2 | Romania | 28 | 26 | 25 | 79 |
| 3 | Yugoslavia | 23 | 20 | 22 | 65 |
| 4 | Germany | 21 | 19 | 13 | 53 |
| 5 | East Germany | 13 | 8 | 15 | 36 |
| 6 | Slovenia | 9 | 5 | 7 | 21 |
| 7 | Czech Republic | 9 | 3 | 3 | 15 |
| 8 | Czechoslovakia | 8 | 8 | 9 | 25 |
| 9 | West Germany | 7 | 14 | 17 | 38 |
| 10 | Serbia and Montenegro | 6 | 6 | 2 | 14 |
| 11 | Austria | 5 | 4 | 5 | 14 |
| 12 | Croatia | 4 | 8 | 11 | 23 |
| 13 | Poland | 2 | 4 | 1 | 7 |
| 14 | Macedonia | 2 | 0 | 1 | 3 |
| 15 | Slovakia | 0 | 5 | 4 | 9 |
| 16 | Italy | 0 | 1 | 0 | 1 |
| 17 | Bosnia and Herzegovina | 0 | 0 | 4 | 4 |
| 18 | Bulgaria | 0 | 0 | 1 | 1 |
| 18 | Sweden | 0 | 0 | 1 | 1 |
| Totals (19 entries) | | 165 | 165 | 164 | 494 |

== List of hosts ==
List of hosts by the number of championships hosted.

| Times hosted | Host | Year(s) |
|---|---|---|
| 5 | Germany (including East and West Germany) | 1955, 1959, 1974, 1986, 1994 |
| 4 | Austria | 1957, 1968, 1976, 1990 |
| 4 | Czech Republic (including Czechoslovakia) | 1962, 1982, 1992, 1996 |
| 3 | Romania | 1966, 1980, 2004 |
| 3 | Yugoslavia | 1953, 1972, 1984 |
| 1 | Croatia | 2002 |
| 1 | Hungary | 1988 |
| 1 | Italy | 1970 |
| 1 | Poland | 2000 |
| 1 | Slovenia | 1998 |
| 1 | Switzerland | 1978 |
