= 1959 World Ninepin Bowling Classic Championships =

European bowling competition

4th World Ninepin Bowling Classic Championships
- Host city: Bautzen
- Country: East Germany
- Nations: 9
- Athletes: 98
- Events: 4
- Opening: September 22, 1959
- Closing: September 27, 1959

The 1959 World Ninepin Bowling Classic Championships was the fourth edition of the championships and was held in Bautzen, East Germany, from 22 to 27 September 1959.

In the men's competition the title was won by Yugoslavia in the team competition and by Eberhard Luther (East Germany) in the individual event. In the women's competition the title was won by East Germany in the team competition and by Hilde Beljan (East Germany) in the individual event.

== Participating teams ==
=== Men ===
- Austria
- Czechoslovakia
- East Germany
- France
- Hungary
- Romania
- Switzerland
- West Germany
- Yugoslavia

=== Women ===
- Austria
- Czechoslovakia
- East Germany
- Hungary
- Romania

== Results ==
=== Men - team ===
The competition was played with 200 throws mixed (100 full, 100 clean). Teams were composed of 6 competitors
and the scores were added up.

Rank	Team	Result		
Rank	Team	All	Clean	Total
1st place, gold medalist(s)	Yugoslavia; Vladimir Martelanc; Rajko Starc; Mate Buneta; Miroslav Steržaj; Leon Grom; Dujam Smoljanović	3593; 599; 600; 607; 598; 559; 630	1711; 291; 267; 276; 295; 265; 317	5304; 890; 867; 883; 893; 824; 947
2nd place, silver medalist(s)	Hungary; Gyula Várfalvi; József Rákos; György Gyebrovszky; János Brachmann; Mátyás Balogh; József Szabó	3476; 576; 588; 586; 557; 586; 583	1709; 297; 305; 291; 255; 290; 271	5185; 873; 893; 877; 812; 876; 854
3rd place, bronze medalist(s)	East Germany; Erhard Schulze; Gerhard Grohs; Otto Dietz; Herbert Uhlmann; Horst Bräutigam; Eberhard Luther	3475; 573; 590; 564; 564; 598; 586	1706; 297; 291; 264; 264; 309; 281	5181; 870; 881; 828; 828; 907; 867
4	Czechoslovakia; Pavol Halpert; Lumír Vostřák; Václav Šavlík; Imrich Mihál; Emil Bachratý; Karol Demitrovič	3498; 594; 581; 588; 591; 558; 586	1664; 256; 264; 289; 295; 259; 301	5162; 850; 845; 877; 886; 817; 887
5	West Germany; Herman Birner; Walter Trinkaus; Brönner; Albert Pfeiffer; Gerber; Richard Pelikan	3375; 569; 573; 536; 550; 543; 604	1676; 246; 275; 249; 318; 283; 305	5051; 815; 848; 785; 868; 826; 909
6	Austria; Johann Binder; Ludvig Lukaschek; Herbert Bauer; Alfred Baierl; Ludwig Curda; Hans Haidvogel	3352; 534; 580; 544; 578; 562; 554	1683; 244; 253; 282; 291; 311; 302	5035; 778; 833; 826; 869; 873; 856
7	Romania; Alexandru Andrei; Dragomirescu; Ion Micoroiu; Zambori; Ivan; Francise Micola	3399; 569; 589; 564; 563; 549; 565	1567; 275; 231; 270; 247; 278; 266	4966; 844; 820; 834; 810; 827; 831
8	France; Rene Weiss; Robert Schneider; Jean-Luc Vonarx; Pierre Neff; Frederic Zimmermann; Charles Metzger	3308; 553; 512; 570; 555; 569; 549	1482; 252; 226; 270; 192; 243; 299	4790; 805; 738; 840; 747; 812; 848
9	Switzerland; Josef Stocker; Walter Gnos; Fritz Brönimann; Max Ehrsam; Josef Schüler; Hans Biechy	3273; 540; 578; 530; 534; 571; 520	1398; 210; 226; 233; 241; 261; 227	4671; 750; 804; 763; 775; 832; 747

=== Women - team ===
The competition was played with 100 throws mixed (50 full, 50 clean). Teams were composed of 6 competitors
and the scores were added up.

Rank	Team	Result		
Rank	Team	All	Clean	Total
1st place, gold medalist(s)	East Germany; Hannelore Cebulla; Elisabeth Bannert; Liane Lohse; Edith Balcke; Hilde Beljan; Gera Bamberg	1683; 290; 276; 282; 278; 288; 269	783; 107; 132; 132; 141; 150; 121	2466; 397; 408; 414; 419; 438; 390
2nd place, silver medalist(s)	Hungary; Györgyné Soos; Jenőné Vajda; Gézáné Ballagó; Gyuláné Schrett; Erzsébet Kuzma; Sándorné Wenzel	1623; 277; 267; 283; 269; 262; 265	799; 134; 106; 158; 125; 146; 130	2422; 411; 373; 441; 394; 408; 395
3rd place, bronze medalist(s)	Austria; Hedwig Biedermann; Stefanie Kriha; Wilhelmine Hensel; Maria Schmoranzer; Margarete Wallner; Rosa Kesselgruber	1626; 268; 281; 278; 270; 272; 257	783; 129; 122; 149; 129; 122; 132	2409; 397; 403; 427; 399; 394; 389
4	Romania; Maria Nadas; Felszeghi; Margareta Szemanyi; Rezac; Nagy; Arion	1565; 271; 257; 254; 259; 259; 265	824; 135; 132; 140; 141; 141; 135	2389; 406; 389; 394; 400; 400; 400
5	Czechoslovakia; Zdeňka Těthalová; Růžena Račková; Liduše Kusnierzová; Martina Hnízdilová; Vlasta Šindlerová; Anna Jirásková	1641; 253; 287; 278; 274; 267; 282	746; 116; 116; 142; 110; 130; 132	2387; 369; 403; 420; 384; 397; 414

=== Men - individual ===
Rank	Name	Qualification			Final			Result		
Rank	Name	All	Clean	Total	All	Clean	Total	All	Clean	Total
1st place, gold medalist(s)	(East Germany) Eberhard Luther	634	317	951	594	293	887	1228	610	1838
2nd place, silver medalist(s)	(Socialist Federal Republic of Yugoslavia) Dujan Smoljanović	607	301	908	597	320	917	1204	621	1825
3rd place, bronze medalist(s)	(Socialist Federal Republic of Yugoslavia) Vladimir Martelanc	616	325	941	580	297	877	1196	622	1818
4	(Hungary) József Szabó	596	277	873	579	333	912	1175	610	1785
5	(East Germany) Horst Bräutigam	613	284	897	568	291	859	1181	575	1756
6	(Romania) Francise Micola	611	281	892	551	308	859	1162	589	1751
7	(East Germany) Gerhard Grohs	573	282	855	588	300	888	1161	582	1743
8	(Czechoslovakia) Imrich Mihál	588	296	884	590	266	856	1178	562	1740
9	(Socialist Federal Republic of Yugoslavia) Miroslav Steržaj	575	274	849	577	298	875	1152	572	1724
10	(East Germany) Erhard Schulze	600	306	906	545	267	812	1145	573	1718
11	(Czechoslovakia) Václav Šavlík	570	314	884	541	291	832	1111	605	1716
12	(Hungary) József Rákos	607	255	862	550	295	845	1157	550	1707
13	(Hungary) György Gyebrovszky	555	299	854	555	292	847	1110	591	1701
14	(Romania) Erdei	561	283	844	577	274	851	1138	557	1695
15	(Austria) Walter Grois	558	286	844	585	242	827	1143	528	1671
16	(Austria) Alfred Baierl	581	282	863	557	244	801	1138	526	1664
17	(Czechoslovakia) Karol Demitrovič	563	285	848	538	277	815	1101	562	1663
18	(France) Charles Metzger	592	276	868	542	252	794	1134	528	1662
19	(Socialist Federal Republic of Yugoslavia) Evgen Kobal	557	290	847	516	275	791	1073	565	1638
20	(West Germany) Walter Trinkaus	542	300	842			0	542	300	842
21	(West Germany) Albert Pfeiffer	548	290	838			0	548	290	838
22	(West Germany) Gerber	568	269	837			0	568	269	837
23	(West Germany) Richard Pelikan	561	275	836			0	561	275	836
24	(Switzerland) Max Ehrsam	561	275	836			0	561	275	836
25	(Switzerland) Josef Schüler	553	282	835			0	553	282	835
26	(Czechoslovakia) Pěkný	561	274	835			0	561	274	835
27	(Romania) Ion Micoroiu	562	269	831			0	562	269	831
28	(Austria) Ludwig Curda	540	290	830			0	540	290	830
29	(Romania) Restemann	560	266	826			0	560	266	826
30	(Hungary) István Feltein	549	270	819			0	549	270	819
31	(Romania) Alexandru Andrei	559	259	818			0	559	259	818
32	(France) Schnitter	540	265	805			0	540	265	805
33	(Austria) Hans Haidvogel	549	253	802			0	549	253	802
34	(France) Frederic Zimmermann	567	232	799			0	567	232	799
35	(Switzerland) Walter Gnos	560	230	790			0	560	230	790
36	(France) Jean-Luc Vonarx	551	231	782			0	551	231	782
37	(Switzerland) Fritz Brönimann	525	251	776			0	525	251	776

=== Women - individual ===
Rank	Name	Qualification			Final			Result		
Rank	Name	All	Clean	Total	All	Clean	Total	All	Clean	Total
1st place, gold medalist(s)	(East Germany) Hilde Beljan	296	140	436	285	129	414	581	269	850
2nd place, silver medalist(s)	(Hungary) Gézáné Ballagó	290	140	430	299	117	416	589	257	846
3rd place, bronze medalist(s)	(Hungary) Györgyné Soos	287	135	422	290	132	422	577	267	844
4	(East Germany) Edith Balcke	293	143	436	278	126	404	571	269	840
5	(Romania) Nagy	293	126	419	286	129	415	579	255	834
6	(Czechoslovakia) Liduše Kusnierzová	291	124	415	295	123	418	586	247	833
7	(Hungary) Erzsébet Kuzma	287	123	410	275	142	417	562	265	827
8	(East Germany) Charlotte Zeibig	276	148	424	273	123	396	549	271	820
9	(Czechoslovakia) Růžena Račková	254	151	405	295	115	410	549	266	815
10	(Hungary) Emma Molnár	284	150	434	255	125	380	539	275	814
11	(East Germany) Elisabeth Bannert	257	159	416	265	120	385	522	279	801
12	(Czechoslovakia) Anna Jirásková	285	124	409	262	119	381	547	243	790
13	(Socialist Federal Republic of Yugoslavia) Anika Jakovec	264	140	404			0	264	140	404
14	(Austria) Maria Schmoranzer	267	132	399			0	267	132	399
15	(Austria) Marie Langmayer	263	133	396			0	263	133	396
16	(Romania) Maria Nadas	262	132	394			0	262	132	394
17	(Romania) Arion	276	118	394			0	276	118	394
18	(Austria) Stefanie Kriha	266	124	390			0	266	124	390
19	(Romania) Szemanyi	263	121	384			0	263	121	384
20	(Austria) Gertrude Schmidka	260	120	380			0	260	120	380
21	(Austria) Rosa Kesselgruber	255	112	367			0	255	112	367
22	(Socialist Federal Republic of Yugoslavia) Kazi	254	108	362			0	254	108	362
23	(Czechoslovakia) Drápelová	256	98	354			0	256	98	354

== Medal summary ==
=== Medal table ===
* Host nation (Host nation)

Rank	Nation	Gold	Silver	Bronze	Total
1	East Germany (GDR)*	3	0	1	4
2	Yugoslavia (YUG)	1	1	1	3
3	Hungary (HUN)	0	3	1	4
4	Austria (AUT)	0	0	1	1
Totals (4 entries)		4	4	4	12

=== Men ===
Event	Gold	Silver	Bronze
Individual	Eberhard Luther; East Germany	Dujan Smoljanović; Yugoslavia	Vladimir Martelanc; Yugoslavia
Team	Yugoslavia; Vladimir Martelanc; Rajko Starc; Mate Buneta; Miroslav Steržaj; Leon Grom; Dujam Smoljanović	Hungary; Gyula Várfalvi; József Rákos; György Gyebrovszky; János Brachmann; Mátyás Balogh; József Szabó	East Germany; Erhard Schulze; Gerhard Grohs; Otto Dietz; Herbert Uhlmann; Horst Bräutigam; Eberhard Luther

=== Women ===
Event	Gold	Silver	Bronze
Individual	Hilde Beljan; East Germany	Gézáné Ballagó; Hungary	Györgyné Soos; Hungary
Team	East Germany; Hannelore Cebulla; Elisabeth Bannert; Liane Lohse; Edith Balcke; Hilde Beljan; Gera Bamberg	Hungary; Györgyné Soos; Jenőné Vajda; Gézáné Ballagó; Gyuláné Schrett; Erzsébet Kuzma; Sándorné Wenzel	Austria; Hedwig Biedermann; Stefanie Kriha; Wilhelmine Hensel; Maria Schmoranzer; Margarete Wallner; Rosa Kesselgruber
