= 1968 World Ninepin Bowling Classic Championships =

European bowling competition

7th World Ninepin Bowling Classic Championships
- Host city: Linz
- Country: Austria
- Nations: 10
- Athletes: 124
- Sport: 9-pins
- Events: 6
- Opening: June 9, 1968
- Closing: June 15, 1968

The 1968 World Ninepin Bowling Classic Championships was the seventh edition of the championships and was held in Linz, Austria, from 9 to 15 June 1968.

In the men's team competition the title was won by East Germany. Czechoslovakia's Ivo Blaževič and Miroslav Kočarek won the pair competition and Yugoslavian Miroslav Steržaj the individual event. In the women's team competition the title was won by Romania. East Germany's Gertraude Engelmann and Astrid Schmidt won the pair competition and Ossi Sigrid Lidner in the individual event.

== Participating nations ==
- Austria (16)
- Czechoslovakia (14)
- East Germany (14)
- Hungary (14)
- France (8)
- Italy (7)
- Romania (14)
- Switzerland (7)
- West Germany (14)
- Yugoslavia (16)

== Results ==
=== Men - team ===
The competition was played with 200 throws mixed (100 all, 100 clean). Teams were composed of 6 competitors
and the scores were added up.

Rank	Team	Result			
Rank	Team	All	Clear	X	Total
1st place, gold medalist(s)	East Germany; Dieter Seifert; Christoph Wlocka; Gerhard Grohs; Klaus Beyer; Horst Bräutigam; Eberhard Luther	3582; 597; 582; 584; 608; 590; 621	1840; 298; 282; 299; 321; 305; 335	9; 1; 3; 1; 3; 1; 0	5422; 895; 864; 883; 929; 895; 956
2nd place, silver medalist(s)	Romania; Petre Purge; Gheorghe Silvestru; Vasile Măntoiu; Constantin Rădulescu; Ion Micoroiu; Cristu Vănătoru	3483; 576; 604; 559; 571; 594; 579	1869; 318; 347; 284; 286; 311; 323	21; 2; 1; 6; 5; 5; 2	5352; 894; 951; 843; 857; 905; 902
3rd place, bronze medalist(s)	West Germany; Dieter Zieher; Josef Beck; Werner Günzel; Theo Holzmann; Erwin Siebert; Richard Pelikan	3500; 585; 574; 585; 580; 583; 593	1815; 331; 331; 317; 282; 263; 291	20; 2; 1; 1; 5; 8; 3	5315; 916; 905; 902; 862; 846; 884
4	Yugoslavia; Ivica Juričević; Jože Farkaš; Marinko Čubrilo; Jože Turk; Jože Slibar; Miroslav Steržaj	3460; 583; 570; 549; 579; 578; 601	1826; 289; 295; 270; 332; 303; 337	14; 4; 1; 5; 2; 2; 0	5286; 872; 865; 819; 911; 881; 938
5	Hungary; József Rákos; Pál Tösi; István Feltein; Gyula Várfalvi; Imre Kiss; Miklós Varga	3506; 613; 576; 603; 574; 582; 558	1753; 273; 295; 342; 285; 305; 253	17; 3; 3; 1; 3; 3; 4	5259; 886; 871; 945; 859; 887; 811
6	Czechoslovakia; Josef Hapl; Ivo Blažević; Miroslav Kočárek; Lumír Vostřák; Imrich Mihál; Pavol Halpert	3473; 565; 588; 596; 571; 580; 573	1752; 282; 284; 322; 282; 287; 295	19; 4; 3; 0; 2; 7; 3	5225; 847; 872; 918; 853; 867; 868
7	Austria; Gerhard Babl; Walter Grünanger; Ludwig Curda; Leo Köck; Walter Heiseler; Gerhard Pösch	3487; 548; 595; 589; 598; 575; 582	1728; 280; 298; 320; 283; 260; 287	29; 7; 2; 4; 7; 7; 2	5215; 828; 893; 909; 881; 835; 869
8	Italy; Rottensteiner; Adolf Pixner; E. Anrather; Karl Schgör; Siegfried Anrather; Michael Niederstätter	3345; 566; 530; 541; 580; 574; 554	1574; 259; 259; 250; 247; 286; 273	37; 8; 4; 7; 10; 3; 5	4919; 825; 789; 791; 827; 860; 827
9	France; Marcel Weber; Jean Billard; Jean Claude Rousselet; Adolphe Cassel; Charles Metzger; Joseph Fritsch	3324; 562; 543; 544; 545; 586; 544	1561; 268; 243; 237; 255; 267; 291	42; 6; 7; 14; 7; 5; 3	4885; 830; 786; 781; 800; 853; 835
10	Switzerland; René Abt; Otto Benkert; Kurt Friedli; Max Ehrsam; Willi Moser; Walter Mast	3298; 546; 530; 565; 577; 526; 554	1499; 245; 236; 283; 235; 247; 253	49; 8; 10; 8; 6; 6; 11	4797; 791; 766; 848; 812; 773; 807

=== Women - team ===
The competition was played with 100 throws mixed (50 all, 50 clean). Teams were composed of 6 competitors
and the scores were added up.

Rank	Team	Result			
Rank	Team	All	Clear	X	Total
1st place, gold medalist(s)	Romania; Tinca Balaban; Florica Neguțoiu; Crista Szöcs; Elena Trandafir; Margareta Szemanyi; Cornelia Moldoveanu	1664; 261; 296; 295; 280; 287; 245	842; 113; 156; 155; 135; 134; 149	12; 4; 2; 0; 2; 3; 1	2506; 374; 452; 450; 415; 421; 394
2nd place, silver medalist(s)	Czechoslovakia; Marie Mikulčiková; Hana Mádlová; Vĕra Lauerová; Zdeňka Těthalová; Vlasta Šindlerová; Marie Švorbová	1690; 287; 278; 271; 273; 292; 289	793; 133; 104; 131; 116; 134; 175	22; 4; 5; 2; 4; 5; 2	2483; 420; 382; 402; 389; 426; 464
3rd place, bronze medalist(s)	East Germany; Brigitte Uhle; Astrid Schmidt; Annemarie Preller; Sigrid Lindner; Ursula Rippin; Gertraude Engelmann	1695; 271; 283; 281; 280; 280; 300	784; 151; 141; 134; 113; 101; 144	21; 1; 3; 1; 7; 6; 3	2479; 422; 424; 415; 393; 381; 444
4	West Germany; Ulrike Isenbeck; Dagmar Kühne; Gisela Kürbs; Rosemarie Maier; Lilo Schumann; Maria Schwarz	1656; 275; 282; 274; 279; 278; 268	756; 140; 130; 135; 113; 123; 115	26; 4; 4; 6; 3; 3; 6	2412; 415; 412; 409; 392; 401; 383
5	Yugoslavia; Sonja Jevšnikar; Cvetka Čadež; Irena Kaločaj; Francka Hafner; Jožica Šarman; Gorinka Kovrlija	1625; 268; 274; 261; 267; 291; 264	749; 115; 139; 122; 116; 120; 137	29; 6; 4; 4; 5; 8; 2	2374; 383; 413; 383; 383; 411; 401
6	Austria; Frieda Zitta; Hermine Dobias; Hermine Hafenscherer; Elfriede Schiffmann; Friederike Ernst; Elfriede Beer	1619; 272; 269; 269; 292; 249; 268	735; 113; 123; 131; 130; 111; 127	29; 7; 7; 1; 5; 3; 6	2354; 385; 392; 400; 422; 360; 395
7	Hungary; Mátyásné Sallai; Julianna Czéher; Imréné Szilasi; Jánosné Kustán; Györgyné Kiss; Kálmánné Nádas	1592; 273; 257; 254; 270; 281; 257	725; 139; 124; 115; 107; 116; 124	31; 4; 5; 8; 8; 4; 2	2317; 412; 381; 369; 377; 397; 381

=== Men - pair ===
Rank	Team	Result			
Rank	Team	All	Clear	X	Total
1st place, gold medalist(s)	Czechoslovakia; Miroslav Kočarek; Ivo Blaževič	1223; 619; 604	645; 329; 316	0; 0; 0	1868; 948; 920
2nd place, silver medalist(s)	Yugoslavia; Miroslav Steržaj; Jože Turk	1180; 595; 585	680; 363; 317	2; 1; 1	1860; 958; 902
3rd place, bronze medalist(s)	East Germany; Eberhard Luther; Klaus Beyer	1214; 610; 604	630; 322; 308	2; 2; 0	1844; 932; 912
4	Hungary; József Rákos; István Feltein	1248; 630; 618	571; 294; 277	3; 1; 2	1819; 924; 895
5	East Germany; Dieter Seifert; Wolfgang Holewa	1227; 603; 624	576; 306; 270	4; 1; 3	1803; 909; 894
6	Romania; Gheorghe Silvestru; Ion Micoroiu	1169; 585; 584	631; 328; 303	4; 0; 4	1800; 913; 887
7	Romania; Petre Purge; Cristu Vănătoru	1173; 594; 579	618; 327; 291	6; 2; 4	1791; 921; 870
8	Austria; Ludwig Curda; Walter Grünanger	1175; 574; 601	599; 291; 308	7; 3; 4	1774; 865; 909
9	West Germany; Dieter Zieher; Werner Günzel	1160; 593; 567	591; 281; 310	6; 4; 2	1751; 874; 877
10	West Germany; Josef Beck; Theo Holzmann	1154; 560; 594	572; 295; 277	8; 5; 3	1726; 855; 871
11	Czechoslovakia; Imrich Mihál; Pavol Halpert	1157; 599; 558	538; 252; 286	11; 10; 1	1695; 851; 844
12	Hungary; Pál Tösi; Imre Kiss	1149; 565; 584	544; 290; 254	9; 3; 6	1693; 855; 838
13	Yugoslavia; Duro Triplat; Lojze Kordež	1096; 529; 567	590; 286; 304	6; 3; 3	1686; 815; 871
14	Austria; Max Junger; Johann Koinig	1100; 553; 547	559; 274; 285	10; 6; 4	1659; 827; 832
15	Italy; Michael Niederstätter; Siegfried Anrather	1115; 544; 571	535; 275; 260	13; 9; 4	1650; 819; 831
16	France; Jean Billard; Jean Claude Rousselet	1110; 556; 554	517; 272; 245	10; 3; 7	1627; 828; 799
17	France; Bernard Bankhauser; Gerard Hess	1120; 582; 538	505; 266; 239	19; 8; 11	1625; 848; 777
18	Switzerland; Max Ehrsam; Kurt Friedli	1061; 528; 533	551; 297; 254	14; 6; 8	1612; 825; 787
19	Italy; Karl Schgör; Rottensteiner	1128; 575; 553	476; 245; 231	25; 9; 16	1604; 820; 784
20	Switzerland; Walter Mast; Werner Brechbühl	1068; 544; 524	474; 236; 238	21; 10; 11	1542; 780; 762

=== Women - pair ===
Rank	Team	Result			
Rank	Team	All	Clear	X	Total
1st place, gold medalist(s)	East Germany; Astrid Schmidt; Gertraude Engelmann	599; 297; 302	313; 164; 149	0; 0; 0	912; 461; 451
2nd place, silver medalist(s)	Czechoslovakia; Marie Švorbová; Vlasta Šindlerová	591; 309; 282	272; 130; 142	7; 1; 6	863; 439; 424
3rd place, bronze medalist(s)	Hungary; Györgyné Kiss; Kálmánné Nádas	565; 281; 284	293; 160; 133	3; 1; 2	858; 441; 417
4	West Germany; Gisela Kürbs; Lilo Schuhmann	573; 304; 269	262; 123; 139	11; 7; 4	835; 427; 408
5	Romania; Crista Szöcs; Margareta Szemanyi	561; 291; 270	273; 123; 150	6; 5; 1	834; 414; 420
6	East Germany; Renate Engelhard; Annemarie Preller	564; 262; 302	264; 116; 148	12; 7; 5	828; 378; 450
7	Czechoslovakia; Marie Mikulčíková; Vĕra Lauerová	561; 284; 277	262; 138; 124	5; 1; 4	823; 422; 401
8	Yugoslavia; Tilka Stergar; Nada Kodrnja	538; 278; 260	258; 123; 135	7; 5; 2	796; 401; 395
9	Romania; Elena Trandafir; Florica Neguțoiu	540; 268; 272	254; 147; 107	4; 2; 2	794; 415; 379
10	West Germany; Ulrike Isenback; Dagmar Kühne	543; 270; 273	239; 110; 129	8; 6; 2	782; 380; 402
11	Yugoslavia; Jožica Šarman; Gorinka Kovrlija	508; 248; 260	268; 133; 135	13; 8; 5	776; 381; 395
12	Austria; Hermine Hafenscherer; Elfriede Schiffmann	548; 270; 278	222; 133; 89	8; 0; 8	770; 403; 367
13	Austria; Dorothea Zahradnik; Eva Gruber	526; 254; 272	238; 121; 117	10; 4; 6	764; 375; 389
14	Hungary; Mária Sashalmi; Mátyásné Sallai	484; 240; 244	254; 137; 117	5; 1; 4	738; 377; 361

=== Men - individual ===
Rank	Name	Qualification			Final			Result		
Rank	Name	All	Clean	Total	All	Clean	Total	All	Clean	Total
1st place, gold medalist(s)	(Socialist Federal Republic of Yugoslavia) Miroslav Steržaj	615	335	950	662	317	979	1277	652	1929
2nd place, silver medalist(s)	(West Germany) Josef Beck	601	309	910	617	351	968	1218	660	1878
3rd place, bronze medalist(s)	(West Germany) Erwin Siebert	584	328	912	617	341	958	1201	669	1870
4	(East Germany) Gerhard Grohs	591	321	912	621	334	955	1212	655	1867
5	(Romania) Ion Micoroiu	611	312	923	617	304	921	1228	616	1844
6	(Romania) Vasile Măntoiu	591	340	931	627	278	905	1218	618	1836
7	(Czechoslovakia) Miroslav Kočárek	616	295	911	599	306	905	1215	601	1816
8	(Socialist Federal Republic of Yugoslavia) Jože Farkaš	591	324	915	581	313	894	1172	637	1809
9	(East Germany) Horst Bräutigam	597	300	897	592	313	905	1189	613	1802
10	(Romania) Gheorghe Silvestru	594	291	885	602	310	912	1196	601	1797
11	(Socialist Federal Republic of Yugoslavia) Jože Slibar	601	299	900	599	298	897	1200	597	1797
12	(East Germany) Cristoph Wlocka	620	304	924	605	266	871	1225	570	1795
13	(Socialist Federal Republic of Yugoslavia) Jože Turk	613	296	909	576	308	884	1189	604	1793
14	(Hungary) József Rákos	602	283	885	614	293	907	1216	576	1792
15	(West Germany) Theo Holzmann	591	301	892	590	308	898	1181	609	1790
16	(East Germany) Klaus Beyer	578	356	934	579	275	854	1157	631	1788
17	(Romania) Petre Purge	600	296	896	608	278	886	1208	574	1782
18	(East Germany) Eberhard Luther	571	311	882	603	292	895	1174	603	1777
19	(East Germany) Dieter Seifert	577	299	876	589	310	899	1166	609	1775
20	(Socialist Federal Republic of Yugoslavia) Ivica Juričević	587	300	887	572	314	886	1159	614	1773
21	(Hungary) Gyula Várfalvi	596	282	878	603	286	889	1199	568	1767
22	(Romania) Cristu Vănătoru	592	307	899	572	295	867	1164	602	1766
23	(Hungary) László Szépfalvi	585	312	897	586	278	864	1171	590	1761
24	(East Germany) Wolfgang Holewa	598	295	893	598	265	863	1196	560	1756
25	(Hungary) József Feltein	580	296	876	583	295	878	1163	591	1754
26	(West Germany) Dieter Zieher	571	304	875	552	321	873	1123	625	1748
27	(West Germany) Werner Günzel	575	302	877	576	289	865	1151	591	1742
28	(Czechoslovakia) Ivo Blaževič	601	288	889	567	284	851	1168	572	1740
29	(Hungary) Pál Tösi	569	307	876	579	266	845	1148	573	1721
30	(Czechoslovakia) Antonín Král	606	284	890	538	272	810	1144	556	1700
31	(France) Joseph Fritsch	581	300	881	564	249	813	1145	549	1694
32	(Hungary) Imre Kiss	560	307	867						
33	(Austria) Walter Grünanger	584	283	867						
34	(Austria) Leo Köck	577	288	865						
35	(Socialist Federal Republic of Yugoslavia) Lojze Kordež	568	296	864						
36	(Italy) Karl Schgör	586	277	863						
37	(Austria) Ludwig Curda	580	277	857						
38	(Italy) Siegfried Anrather	557	298	855						
39	(West Germany) Franz Birk	573	281	854						
40	(Italy) Michael Niederstätter	569	279	848						
41	(Czechoslovakia) Josef Hapl	558	288	846						
42	(Switzerland) Willi Moser	560	283	843						
43	(Austria) Walter Heiseler	544	289	833						
44	(Austria) Gerhard Babl	565	267	832						
45	(Czechoslovakia) Pavol Halpert	566	263	829						
46	(Czechoslovakia) Lumír Vostřák	556	270	826						
47	(Italy) Erich Auer	566	260	826						
48	(France) Adolphe Cassel	565	257	822						
49	(France) Jean Billard	546	272	818						
50	(Switzerland) Kurt Friedli	544	259	803						
51	(Switzerland) Walter Mast	540	261	801						
52	(Italy) Rottensteiner	555	240	795						
53	(Switzerland) René Abt	549	245	794						
54	(Austria) Gerhard Pösch	548	244	792						
55	(Italy) E. Anrather	541	246	787						
56	(France) Marcel Weber	553	229	782						
57	(France) Bernard Bankhauser	543	236	779						
58	(Romania) Aurel Sucatu	518	260	778						
59	(Switzerland) Otto Benkert	544	234	778						
60	(France) Gerard Hess	543	231	774						
61	(Switzerland) Max Ehrsam	545	194	739						

=== Women - individual ===
Rank	Name	Qualification			Final			Result		
Rank	Name	All	Clean	Total	All	Clean	Total	All	Clean	Total
1st place, gold medalist(s)	(East Germany) Sigrid Lidner	301	142	443	311	153	464	612	295	907
2nd place, silver medalist(s)	(Socialist Federal Republic of Yugoslavia) Gorinka Kovrlija	304	141	445	297	152	449	601	293	894
3rd place, bronze medalist(s)	(Czechoslovakia) Marie Švorbová	297	150	447	296	149	445	593	299	892
4	(Czechoslovakia) Vlasta Šindlerová	305	131	436	293	159	452	598	290	888
5	(Romania) Crista Scöcs	309	142	451	297	140	437	606	282	888
6	(East Germany) Gertraude Engelmann	284	152	436	283	157	440	567	309	876
7	(Hungary) Györgyné Kiss	279	151	430	297	148	445	576	299	875
8	(East Germany) Brigitte Uhle	289	150	439	292	139	431	581	289	870
9	(Hungary) Kálmánné Nádas	295	157	452	286	119	405	581	276	857
10	(Czechoslovakia) Vĕra Lauerová	289	127	416	309	130	439	598	257	855
11	(Czechoslovakia) Ludmila Fürbachová	309	119	428	294	131	425	603	250	853
12	(East Germany) Astrid Schmidt	282	132	414	309	117	426	591	249	840
13	(Czechoslovakia) Zdeňka Těthalová	284	149	433	273	124	397	557	273	830
14	(East Germany) Renate Engelhard	273	140	413	294	118	412	567	258	825
15	(Czechoslovakia) Marie Mikulčíková	279	132	411	286	125	411	565	257	822
16	(Romania) Ana Marcu	295	116	411	263	142	405	558	258	816
17	(Hungary) Mária Sashalmi	278	145	423	293	97	390	571	242	813
18	(West Germany) Maria Schwarz	281	156	437	263	111	374	544	267	811
19	(West Germany) Lilo Schuhmann	281	136	417	268	125	393	549	261	810
20	(Romania) Margareta Szemanyi	263	153	416	266	125	391	529	278	807
21	(Socialist Federal Republic of Yugoslavia) Cvetka Čadež	287	129	416	272	113	385	559	242	801
22	(Hungary) Julianna Czéher	275	147	422	260	114	374	535	261	796
23	(East Germany) Annemarie Preller	249	161	410						
24	(West Germany) Gisela Kürbs	267	140	407						
25	(East Germany) Ursula Rippin	283	122	405						
26	(West Germany) Anni Stadlbauer	277	126	403						
27	(Romania) Cornelia Moldoveanu	278	125	403						
28	(Romania) Elena Trandafir	268	133	401						
29	(Austria) Eva Gruber	282	119	401						
30	(Romania) Tinca Balaban	274	124	398						
31	(Austria) Frieda Zitta	277	122	399						
32	(West Germany) Dagmar Kühne	282	116	398						
33	(Socialist Federal Republic of Yugoslavia) Jožica Šarman	260	134	394						
34	(Socialist Federal Republic of Yugoslavia) Tilka Stergar	263	130	393						
35	(Austria) Hermine Hafenscherer	266	124	390						
36	(Austria) Elfriede Schiffmann	280	108	388						
37	(Socialist Federal Republic of Yugoslavia) Irena Kaločaj	278	107	385						
38	(Socialist Federal Republic of Yugoslavia) Nada Kodrnja	256	124	380						
39	(Austria) Hermine Dobias	260	117	377						
40	(Hungary) Imréné Szilasi	259	115	374						
41	(Austria) Elfriede Beer	265	109	374						
42	(Hungary) Jánosné Kustán	266	107	373						
43	(West Germany) Rosemarie Maier	257	108	365						

== Medal summary ==
=== Medal table ===
Rank	Nation	Gold	Silver	Bronze	Total
1	East Germany (GDR)	3	0	2	5
2	Czechoslovakia (TCH)	1	2	1	4
3	Yugoslavia (YUG)	1	2	0	3
4	Romania (ROU)	1	1	0	2
5	West Germany (FRG)	0	1	2	3
6	Hungary (HUN)	0	0	1	1
Totals (6 entries)		6	6	6	18

=== Men ===
Event	Gold	Silver	Bronze
Team	East Germany; Klaus Beyer; Horst Bräutigam; Gerhard Grohs; Eberhard Luther; Dieter Seifert; Christoph Wlocka	Romania; Vasile Măntoiu; Ion Micoroiu; Petre Purge; Constantin Rădulescu; Gheorghe Silvestru; Cristu Vinătoru	West Germany; Josef Beck; Werner Günzel; Theo Holzmann; Richard Pelikan; Erwin Siebert; Dieter Zieher
Pair	Czechoslovakia; Ivo Blaževič; Miroslav Kočarek	Yugoslavia; Miroslav Steržaj; Jože Turk	East Germany; Klaus Beyer; Eberhard Luther
Individual	Miroslav Steržaj; Yugoslavia	Josef Beck; West Germany	Erwin Siebert; West Germany

=== Women ===
Event	Gold	Silver	Bronze
Team	Romania; Tinca Balaban; Cornelia Moldoveanu; Florica Neguțoiu; Margareta Szemanyi; Crista Szöcs; Elena Trandafir	Czechoslovakia; Vĕra Lauerová; Hana Mádlová; Marie Mikulčiková; Vlasta Šindlerová; Marie Švorbová; Zdeňka Těthalová	East Germany; Gertraude Engelmann; Sigrid Lindner; Annemarie Preller; Ursula Rippin; Astrid Schmidt; Brigitte Uhle
Pair	East Germany; Gertraude Engelmann; Astrid Schmidt	Czechoslovakia; Vlasta Šindlerová; Marie Švorbová	Hungary; Györgyné Kiss; Kálmánné Nádas
Individual	Sigrid Lidner; East Germany	Gorinka Kovrlija; Yugoslavia	Marie Švorbová; Czechoslovakia
