= 1994 World Ninepin Bowling Classic Championships =

European bowling competition

20th World Ninepin Bowling Classic Championships
- Host city: Ludwigshafen
- Country: Germany
- Sport: 9-pins
- Events: 10
- Opening: May 15, 1994
- Closing: May 22, 1994

The 1994 World Ninepin Bowling Classic Championships was the twentieth edition of the championships and was held in Ludwigshafen, Germany, from 15 to 22 May 1994.

Team competitions has been played in two independent groups. In men group A triumphed Slovenia, and among women, Germans. In group B, both among women and men, the Czechs won. In the men pair competition won Romanians - Stelian Boariu and Vasia Donos. In single event triumphed Firedhelm Zänger and in combination Romanian Stelian Boariu. In the women pair won Czechs - Vlastimila Cahová and Naděžda Dobešová. Naděžda Dobešová also won in single competition, while Hungarian Ágota Kovácsné Grampsch triumphed in combination.

== Participating teams ==
=== Men ===
- Austria
- Bosnia and Herzegovina
- Bulgaria
- Croatia
- Czech Republic
- Denmark
- Estonia
- Germany
- France
- Hungary
- Italy
- Macedonia
- Romania
- Poland
- Slovakia
- Slovenia
- Sweden
- Switzerland

=== Women ===
- Austria
- Bosnia and Herzegovina
- Bulgaria
- Croatia
- Czech Republic
- Denmark
- Estonia
- Germany
- France
- Hungary
- Italy
- Macedonia
- Romania
- Poland
- Slovakia
- Slovenia
- Sweden

== Medal summary ==
=== Medal table ===
* Host nation (Host nation)

Rank	Nation	Gold	Silver	Bronze	Total
1	Czech Republic (CZE)	4	0	0	4
2	Germany (GER)*	2	4	2	8
3	Romania (ROU)	2	1	2	5
4	Hungary (HUN)	1	3	3	7
5	Slovenia (SLO)	1	0	0	1
6	Poland (POL)	0	1	1	2
6	Slovakia (SVK)	0	1	1	2
8	Croatia (CRO)	0	0	1	1
Totals (8 entries)		10	10	10	30

=== Men ===
Event	Gold	Silver	Bronze
Single	Friedhelm Zänger (GER)	Stelian Boariu (ROU)	Andreas Kühn (GER)
Combination	Stelian Boariu (ROU)	Béla Csányi (HUN)	Ion Ruge (ROU)
Pair	Romania; Stelian Boariu; Vasia Donos	Germany; Ralf Koch; Friedhelm Zänger	Germany; Jürgen Fleischer; Christian Schwarz
Team Group A	Slovenia; Boris Benedik; Darko Bizjak; Matjaž Hočevar; Albin Juvančič; Franc Kirbiš; Harry Steržaj; Zdravko Štrukelj; Boris Urbanc	Germany; Jürgen Fleischer; Ralf Koch; Andreas Kühn; Peter Mayer; Christian Schwarz; Christian Span; Werner Stößel; Friedhelm Zänger	Romania; Dumitru Beşe; Stelian Boariu; Vasia Donos; Ernö Gergely; Ion Grigorescu; Leontin Popp; Ion Ruge; Nicolae Lupu
Team Group B	Czech Republic; Zdeněk Gartus; Pavel Kaan; Jaroslav Pichl; Zdeněk Procházka; Viktor Pytlík; Jiří Vícha; Václav Zajíc; Ivan Zámečník	Poland; Włodzimierz Dutkiewicz; Robert Glapiak; Krzysztof Kamiński; Marek Krawczyk; Tadeusz Śliwiński; Leszek Torka; Jacek Wojcieszak	Slovakia; Pavol Deško; Radoslav Fúska; Jozef Kríž; Jozef Pešta; Štefan Púchly; Martin Terebessy; Vojtech Vitkovič

=== Women ===
Event	Gold	Silver	Bronze
Single	Naděžda Dobešová (CZE)	Marianna Török (HUN)	Ágota Kovácsné Grampsch (HUN)
Combination	Ágota Kovácsné Grampsch (HUN)	Cornelia Budy (GER)	Zsuzsanna Biró (HUN)
Pair	Czech Republic; Vlastimila Cahová; Naděžda Dobešová	Germany; Cornelia Budy; Helga Oppelt	Hungary; Zsuzsanna Biró; Marianna Török
Team Group A	Germany; Monika Arnold; Cornelia Budy; Birgit Burkart; Claudia Hoffmann; Andrea Kniße; Helga Oppelt; Beate Schönerstedt; Marianne Zink	Hungary; Zsuzsanna Biró; Andrea Feher; Gabriela Herczeghne Vajda; Ágota Kovácsné Grampsch; Andrea Sebestyen; Marianna Török; Erika Vecseri	Croatia; Velinka First; Štefica Krištof; Marija Mađarević; Sonja Mikac; Ružica Neralić; Biserka Perman; Elda Sinovčić; Vesna Žunek
Team Group B	Czech Republic; Vlastimila Cahová; Zdeňka Cyprová; Naděžda Dobešová; Hana Kropáčová; Dagmar Mrázková; Růžena Smrčková; Eliška Šebestová; Daniela Žďárková	Slovakia; Jana Čiljaková; Ružena Juricová; Eva Králiková; Gabriela Kuchárová; Anna Martišková; Margita Peštová; Naďa Vancová	Poland; Agata Banaszak; Mirosława Dobkowicz; Beata Górczak; Dorota Kopańska; Izabela Mus; Stefania Sikorska; Maria Waszak
