= 1962 World Ninepin Bowling Classic Championships =

European bowling competition

5th World Ninepin Bowling Classic Championships
- Host city: Bratislava
- Country: Czechoslovakia
- Nations: 9
- Athletes: 99
- Sport: 9-pins
- Events: 4
- Opening: September 24, 1962
- Closing: September 29, 1962

The 1962 World Ninepin Bowling Classic Championships was the fifth edition of the championships and was held in Bratislava, Czechoslovakia, from 24 to 29 September 1962.

In the men's competition the title was won by Czechoslovakia in the team competition and by József Szabó (Hungary) in the individual event. In the women's competition the title was won by Jugoslawien in the team competition and by Vlasta Šindlerová (Czechoslovakia) in the individual event.

== Participating teams ==
=== Men ===
- Austria
- Czechoslovakia
- East Germany
- France
- Hungary
- Romania
- Switzerland
- West Germany
- Yugoslavia

=== Women ===
- Austria
- Czechoslovakia
- East Germany
- Hungary
- Romania
- Yugoslavia

== Results ==
=== Men - team ===
The competition was played with 200 throws mixed (100 full, 100 clean). Teams were composed of 6 competitors
and the scores were added up.

Rank	Team	Result			
Rank	Team	All	Clear	X	Total
1st place, gold medalist(s)	Czechoslovakia; Jaroslav Šimůnek; Imrich Mihál; Miroslav Kočárek; Lumír Vostřák; Václav Šavlík; František Prejsler	3497; 581; 576; 606; 576; 539; 619	1762; 305; 298; 307; 280; 313; 259	22; 5; 2; 3; 5; 3; 4	5259; 886; 874; 913; 856; 852; 878
2nd place, silver medalist(s)	Hungary; Rákos József; Kratochwill József; Várfalvi Gyula; Varga Miklós; Révész Jenő; Szabó József	3494; 602; 604; 549; 572; 568; 599	1754; 325; 302; 263; 308; 267; 289	33; 9; 4; 8; 4; 8; 0	5248; 927; 906; 812; 880; 835; 888
3rd place, bronze medalist(s)	East Germany; Erhard Schulze; Werner Einhorn; Horst Bräutigam; Linhard Herold; Gerhard Grohs; Eberhard Luther	3468; 596; 571; 586; 552; 604; 559	1745; 288; 241; 316; 261; 311; 328	25; 3; 10; 3; 4; 2; 3	5213; 884; 812; 902; 813; 915; 887
4	Yugoslavia; Vladimir Martelanc; Jože Šlibar; Miroslav Steržaj; Ivica Juričević; Leon Grom; Dujam Smoljanović	3464; 601; 567; 557; 573; 591; 575	1723; 273; 320; 283; 299; 299; 249	37; 9; 5; 3; 5; 7; 8	5187; 874; 887; 840; 872; 890; 824
5	Romania; Petre Purge; Tiberiu Szemanyi; De Dimitru; Gheorge Andrei; Ion Micoroiu; Constantin Radolescu	3458; 586; 586; 555; 575; 578; 578	1650; 263; 292; 308; 260; 285; 242	34; 4; 8; 2; 5; 4; 11	5108; 849; 878; 863; 835; 863; 820
6	West Germany; Richard Pelikan; Albert Pfeiffer; Rüdiger Bergmann; August Käfer; Peter Kierski; Walter Trinkaus	3466; 582; 604; 576; 574; 572; 558	1622; 311; 269; 249; 255; 242; 296	48; 2; 5; 11; 10; 12; 8	5088; 893; 873; 825; 829; 814; 854
7	Austria; Alfred Baierl; Hermann Aigner; Franz Permoser; Gerhard Pösch; Ludwig Curda; Herbert Waniek	3419; 575; 571; 577; 580; 544; 572	1572; 258; 284; 271; 249; 264; 246	51; 11; 9; 11; 6; 7; 7	4991; 833; 855; 848; 829; 808; 818
8	Switzerland; Walter Ehler; Emil Batainer; Josef Schuter; Gustav Steger; Hans Biechy; Max Ehrsam	3351; 569; 550; 523; 555; 582; 572	1436; 231; 244; 204; 242; 254; 261	95; 19; 17; 23; 9; 17; 10	4787; 800; 794; 727; 797; 836; 833
9	France; René Klein; Pierre E. Jeannet; Lautensclaeger; Robert Wurz; Celeste Nothiesen; Frederik Zimmermann	3359; 536; 544; 564; 541; 589; 585	1337; 216; 229; 210; 190; 235; 257	108; 15; 18; 24; 29; 12; 10	4696; 752; 773; 774; 731; 824; 842

=== Women - team ===
The competition was played with 100 throws mixed (50 full, 50 clean). Teams were composed of 6 competitors
and the scores were added up.

Rank	Team	Result			
Rank	Team	All	Clear	X	Total
1st place, gold medalist(s)	Yugoslavia; Agica Dudovič; Floriana Čadež; Malči Mohar; Gorinka Erski; Francka Erjavec; Barbara Bulič	1738; 290; 290; 301; 290; 283; 284	713; 113; 122; 106; 105; 124; 143	53; 11; 5; 13; 8; 9; 7	2451; 403; 412; 407; 395; 407; 427
2nd place, silver medalist(s)	Romania; Tinca Bolovan; Elena Predeanu; Margareta Szemanyi; Ecaterina Atronovici; Elena Lupescu; Iona Gerhardt	1688; 279; 294; 263; 287; 271; 294	735; 109; 112; 130; 147; 125; 112	40; 8; 7; 6; 7; 4; 8	2423; 388; 406; 393; 434; 396; 406
3rd place, bronze medalist(s)	Czechoslovakia; Růžena Šenkeříková; Anna Jirásková; Marie Lauerová; Ludmila Fürbachová; Liduše Kusnierzová; Vlasta Šindlerová	1676; 285; 285; 278; 269; 291; 268	740; 114; 135; 132; 106; 119; 134	37; 11; 2; 4; 9; 5; 6	2416; 399; 420; 410; 375; 410; 402
4	Hungary; Ernőné Hável; Mátyásné Sallai; Jenőné Vajda; Gyuláné Schrett; Kálmánné Nádas; Gézáné Ballagó	1681; 297; 274; 265; 278; 296; 271	714; 141; 121; 123; 110; 123; 96	45; 7; 8; 5; 4; 10; 11	2395; 438; 395; 388; 388; 419; 367
5	East Germany; Hanelore Cebulla; Irmgard Handschke; Charlotte Zeibig; Christine Füchsel; Hilde Beljan; Ursula Rippin	1622; 265; 266; 266; 279; 277; 269	724; 113; 98; 133; 121; 120; 139	39; 7; 10; 7; 9; 3; 3	2346; 378; 364; 399; 400; 397; 408
6	Austria; Steffi Kriha; Marie Schmoranzer; Hermine Hafenscherer; Margarete Wallner; Hermina Dobias; Frieda Zitta	1676; 284; 273; 282; 274; 274; 289	657; 91; 112; 103; 124; 105; 122	54; 15; 7; 7; 7; 7; 11	2333; 375; 385; 385; 398; 379; 411

=== Men - individual ===
Rank	Name	Qualification				Final				Result			
Rank	Name	All	Clean	X	Total	All	Clean	X	Total	All	Clean	X	Total
1st place, gold medalist(s)	(Hungary) József Szabó	587	294		881	606	328		934	1193	622	7	1815
2nd place, silver medalist(s)	(Czechoslovakia) František Prejsler	556	317		873	609	317		926	1165	634	12	1799
3rd place, bronze medalist(s)	(East Germany) Gerhard Grohs	574	310		884	629	283		912	1203	593	6	1796
4	(Hungary) József Kratochwill	601	305		906	609	274		883	1210	579	11	1789
5	(Socialist Federal Republic of Yugoslavia) Vladimir Martelanc	566	317		883	570	333		903	1136	650	2	1786
6	(East Germany) Horst Bräutigam	602	288		890	588	291		879	1190	579	8	1769
7	(Socialist Federal Republic of Yugoslavia) Ivica Juričević	591	292		883	599	283		882	1190	575	8	1765
8	(Czechoslovakia) Miroslav Kočárek	557	320		877	576	308		884	1133	628	2	1761
9	(Austria) Hermann Aigner	595	300		895	582	283		865	1177	583	7	1760
10	(West Germany) Richard Pelikan	597	276		873	579	306		885	1176	582	4	1758
11	(Romania) Tiberiu Szemanyi	591	277		868	578	309		887	1169	586	9	1755
12	(East Germany) Eberhard Luther	604	284		888	585	266		851	1189	550	13	1739
13	(Hungary) Miklós Varga	595	282		877	574	275		849	1169	557	4	1726
14	(West Germany) Albert Pfeiffer	574	284		858	574	290		864	1148	574	13	1722
15	(Czechoslovakia) Jaroslav Šimůnek	602	279		881	575	262		837	1177	541	8	1718
16	(Socialist Federal Republic of Yugoslavia) Leon Grom	604	276		880	558	274		832	1162	550	5	1712
17	(Czechoslovakia) Imrich Mihál	601	280		881	547	264		811	1148	544	14	1692
18	(West Germany) Walter Trinkaus	586	281		867	559	262		821	1145	543	7	1688
19	(Romania) Petre Purge	598	254		852	547	267		814	1145	521	21	1666
20	(Hungary) József Rákos	562	285	1	847								
21	(East Germany) Peter Kasper	571	275	8	846								
22	(Romania) Emanuel Vinatoru	594	248	7	842								
23	(East Germany) Erhard Schulze	566	275	2	841								
24	(Romania) Ion Micoroiu	575	260	7	835								
25	(Socialist Federal Republic of Yugoslavia) Miroslav Steržaj	531	297	5	828								
26	(Switzerland) Gustav Steger	563	263	5	826								
27	(Austria) Herbert Waniek	576	246	11	822								
28	(France) Celeste Nothiesen	554	263	10	817								
29	(Switzerland) Max Ehrsam	567	249	17	816								
30	(Austria) Ludwig Curda	577	236	11	813								
31	(France) Frederic Zimmermann	559	248	13	807								
32	(Switzerland) Hans Biechy	519	274	10	793								
33	(West Germany) Werner Günzel	551	238	10	789								
34	(Austria) Willy Bärthlein	542	246	12	788								
35	(France) René Klein	549	228	17	777								
36	(Switzerland) Walter Ehrler	542	226	21	768								
37	(France) Pierre E. Jeannet	530	231	16	761								

=== Women - individual ===
Rank	Name	Qualification				Final				Result			
Rank	Name	All	Clean	X	Total	All	Clean	X	Total	All	Clean	X	Total
1st place, gold medalist(s)	(Czechoslovakia) Vlasta Šindlerová	302	131		433	288	140		428	590	271	5	861
2nd place, silver medalist(s)	(Czechoslovakia) Liduše Kusnierzová	289	138		427	297	128		425	586	266	11	852
3rd place, bronze medalist(s)	(Hungary) Kálmánné Nádas	300	124		424	283	142		425	583	266	9	849
4	(East Germany) Ursula Rippin	299	138		437	293	115		408	592	253	11	845
5	(Socialist Federal Republic of Yugoslavia) Gorinka Erski	307	142		449	274	112		386	581	254	9	835
6	(Romania) Elena Predeanu	279	142		421	299	108		407	578	250	11	828
7	(Romania) Ecaterina Antonovici	282	132		414	276	129		405	558	261	21	819
8	(Austria) Frieda Zitta	287	124		411	279	126		405	566	250	14	816
9	(East Germany) Hilde Beljan	289	105		394	275	143		418	564	248	14	812
10	(Czechoslovakia) Anna Jirásková	296	122		418	279	115		394	575	237	10	812
11	(Hungary) Emőné Hável	279	126		405	272	114		386	551	240	9	791
12	(East Germany) Ingrid Meinhold	286	120		406	254	110		364	540	230	15	770
13	(Hungary) Elena Lupescu	286	116		402	270	96		366	556	212	20	768
14	(East Germany) Charlotte Zeibig	282	110	8	392								
15	(Socialist Federal Republic of Yugoslavia) Barbara Bulič	270	121	7	391								
16	(East Germany) Christine Füchsel	282	105	7	387								
17	(Czechoslovakia) Marie Lauerová	269	115	10	384								
18	(Hungary) Teréz Steckl	277	105	7	382								
19	(Socialist Federal Republic of Yugoslavia) Franciška Erjavec	275	101	14	376								
20	(Hungary) Gézáné Ballagó	278	96	10	374								
21	(Socialist Federal Republic of Yugoslavia) Agica Dudovič	257	115	7	372								
22	(Romania) Margareta Szamanyi	266	104	11	370								
23	(Austria) Franciska Hayden	263	104	12	367								
24	(Austria) Rosa Kesselgruber	262	97	12	359								
25	(Austria) Marie Schmoranzer	263	94	10	357								

== Medal summary ==
=== Medal table ===
* Host nation (Host nation)

Rank	Nation	Gold	Silver	Bronze	Total
1	Czechoslovakia (TCH)*	2	2	1	5
2	Hungary (HUN)	1	1	1	3
3	Yugoslavia (YUG)	1	0	0	1
4	Romania (ROU)	0	1	0	1
5	East Germany (GDR)	0	0	2	2
Totals (5 entries)		4	4	4	12

=== Men ===
Event	Gold	Silver	Bronze
Team	Czechoslovakia; Jaroslav Šimůnek; Imrich Mihál; Miroslav Kočárek; Lumír Vostřák; Václav Šavlík; František Prejser	Hungary; Rákos József; Kratochwill József; Várfalvi Gyula; Varga Miklós; Révész Jenő; Szabó József	East Germany; Erhard Schulze; Werner Einhorn; Horst Bräutigam; Linhard Herold; Gerhard Grohs; Eberhard Luther
Individual	József Szabó; Hungary	František Prejsler; Czechoslovakia	Gerhard Grohs; East Germany

=== Women ===
Event	Gold	Silver	Bronze
Team	Yugoslavia; Agica Dudovič; Floriana Čadež; Malči Mohar; Gorinka Erski; Francka Erjavec; Barbara Bulič	Romania; Tinca Bolovan; Elena Predeanu; Margareta Szemanyi; Ecaterina Atronovici; Elena Lupescu; Iona Gerhardt	Czechoslovakia; Růžena Šenkeříková; Anna Jirásková; Marie Lauerová; Ludmila Fürbachová; Liduše Kusnierzová; Vlasta Šindlerová
Individual	Vlasta Šindlerová; Czechoslovakia	Liduše Kusnierzová; Czechoslovakia	Kálmánné Nádas; Hungary
