= 1970 World Ninepin Bowling Classic Championships =

European bowling competition

8th World Ninepin Bowling Classic Championships
- Host city: Bolzano
- Country: Italy
- Nations: 11
- Athletes: 117
- Sport: 9-pins
- Events: 6
- Opening: May 24, 1970
- Closing: May 30, 1970

The 1970 World Ninepin Bowling Classic Championships was the eighth edition of the championships and was held in Bolzano, Italy, from 24 to 30 May 1970.

In the men's team competition the title was won by West Germany. East Germany's Horst Bräutigam and Eberhard Luther won the pair competition and representing West Germany Dieter Zieher the individual event. In the women's competitions all were won by Romania. Cornelia Petruşcă became three times World Championess by winning in the individual event, pair competition with Elena Trandafir and in the team event.

== Participating nations ==
- Austria (14)
- Czechoslovakia (14)
- East Germany (13)
- Hungary (12)
- France (8)
- Italy (8)
- Romania (12)
- Sweden (4)
- Switzerland (7)
- West Germany (12)
- Yugoslavia (13)

== Results ==
=== Men - team ===
The competition was played with 200 throws mixed (100 all, 100 clean). Teams were composed of 6 competitors
and the scores were added up.

Rank	Team	Result			
Rank	Team	All	Clear	X	Total
1st place, gold medalist(s)	West Germany; Dieter Zieher; Hans Nutz; Theo Holzmann; Josef Beck; Richard Pelikan; Werner Günzel	3543; 607; 588; 594; 598; 576; 580	1761; 324; 282; 272; 301; 291; 291	22; 0; 6; 5; 6; 1; 4	5304; 931; 870; 866; 899; 867; 871
2nd place, silver medalist(s)	East Germany; Dieter Seifert; Gerhard Grohs; Helfried Hegenbart; Klaus Beyer; Horst Bräutigam; Eberhard Luther	3473; 610; 555; 568; 589; 576; 575	1762; 295; 292; 267; 294; 287; 327	14; 3; 3; 3; 3; 0; 2	5235; 905; 847; 835; 883; 863; 902
3rd place, bronze medalist(s)	Hungary; József Rákos; József Horváth; Endre Boros; Béla Csányi; Imre Kiss; Pál Tösi	3421; 593; 565; 561; 569; 569; 564	1776; 312; 326; 288; 270; 297; 283	9; 2; 0; 1; 3; 1; 2	5197; 905; 891; 849; 839; 866; 847
4	Romania; Ilie Băiaş; Gheorghe Silvestru; Iosif Tismănar; Christu Vinatoru; Petre Purge; Ion Micoroiu	3478; 574; 603; 555; 576; 577; 593	1705; 274; 277; 280; 293; 292; 289	11; 4; 3; 3; 0; 1; 0	5183; 848; 880; 835; 869; 869; 882
5	Yugoslavia; Anton Česen; Ivica Juričević; Jože Farkaš; Vlado Šojat; Jože Turk; Miroslav Steržaj	3425; 574; 574; 548; 572; 573; 584	1712; 284; 272; 283; 274; 283; 316	21; 4; 2; 2; 4; 6; 3	5137; 858; 846; 831; 846; 856; 900
6	Czechoslovakia; Jaroslav Antonín; Lumír Vostřák; Miroslav Kočárek; Emil Bachratý; Imrich Mihál; Ivo Blaževič	3410; 605; 563; 573; 546; 551; 572	1709; 264; 305; 311; 273; 250; 306	24; 2; 1; 2; 10; 8; 1	5119; 869; 868; 884; 819; 801; 878
7	Austria; Oswald Frind; Rudolf Hofer; Franz Schieder; Herbert Malecek; Walter Günanger; Ludwig Curda	3371; 555; 555; 583; 564; 545; 569	1710; 292; 263; 286; 304; 275; 290	17; 3; 4; 0; 3; 4; 3	5081; 847; 818; 869; 868; 820; 859
8	Italy; Karl Schgör; Alfred Prucker; Alois Gruber; Erwin Marseiler; Michael Niederstätter; Siegfried Anrather	3311; 560; 545; 560; 545; 546; 555	1605; 248; 249; 273; 253; 267; 315	35; 4; 5; 7; 10; 6; 3	4916; 808; 794; 833; 798; 813; 870
9	France; Marcel Weber; Gerard Hess; Andre Pierre; Adolpfe Cassel; Andre Bruand; Joseph Fritsch	3335; 555; 557; 544; 528; 575; 576	1471; 245; 237; 233; 234; 262; 260	53; 8; 13; 9; 11; 4; 8	4806; 800; 794; 777; 762; 837; 836
10	Switzerland; Rene Abt; Heinz Gläser; Kurt Friedli; Willi Moser; Walter Mast; Horst Köhler	3275; 560; 533; 533; 538; 558; 553	1456; 242; 221; 233; 240; 257; 263	65; 9; 13; 18; 9; 8; 8	4731; 802; 754; 766; 778; 815; 816

=== Women - team ===
The competition was played with 100 throws mixed (50 all, 50 clean). Teams were composed of 6 competitors
and the scores were added up.

Rank	Team	Result			
Rank	Team	All	Clear	X	Total
1st place, gold medalist(s)	Romania; Elena Cernat; Ana Marcu; Crista Szöcs; Elena Trandafir; Margareta Szemanyi; Cornelia Petruşcă	1695; 274; 283; 286; 296; 273; 283	790; 120; 156; 126; 130; 106; 152	20; 6; 2; 1; 4; 4; 3	2485; 394; 439; 412; 426; 379; 435
2nd place, silver medalist(s)	East Germany; Brigitte Uhle; Annemarie Preller; Astrid Wloka; Siegfried Lindner; Helga Leuchtmann; Gertraude Engelmann	1672; 308; 263; 269; 284; 258; 290	777; 113; 138; 144; 123; 148; 111	17; 5; 3; 1; 4; 0; 4	2449; 421; 401; 413; 407; 406; 401
3rd place, bronze medalist(s)	West Germany; Rosemarie Maier; Inge Stadlbauer; Edith Herzog; Edith Neidhardt; Ulrike Isenbeck; Renate Günzel	1658; 257; 272; 281; 265; 282; 301	754; 112; 140; 138; 132; 114; 118	30; 7; 3; 2; 4; 7; 7	2412; 369; 412; 419; 397; 396; 419
4	Hungary; Mátyásné Sallai; Zsofia Hursan; Borbála Fenyőházi; Julianna Czéher; Györgyné Kiss; Kálmánné Nádas	1687; 285; 286; 280; 275; 267; 294	709; 114; 114; 104; 135; 116; 126	27; 4; 4; 5; 3; 8; 3	2396; 399; 400; 384; 410; 383; 420
5	Czechoslovakia; Marie Mikulčíková; Hana Mádlová; Eva Jirasová; Zdena Těthalová; Věra Lauerová; Marie Švorbová	1640; 264; 279; 292; 263; 262; 280	731; 120; 131; 138; 89; 116; 137	30; 5; 1; 2; 18; 3; 1	2371; 384; 410; 430; 352; 378; 417
6	Austria; Wilhelmine Kriechbaum; Rosemarie Höller; Elfriede Beer; Hermine Dobias; Friederike Ernst; Hermine Hafenscherer	1672; 275; 275; 269; 287; 292; 274	697; 115; 122; 124; 113; 103; 120	25; 9; 7; 4; 1; 4; 0	2369; 390; 397; 393; 400; 395; 394
7	Yugoslavia; Eva Ludvig; Anka Janša; Nada Kodrnja; Irena Kaločai; Marija Popović; Fricka Mačič	1621; 289; 274; 264; 282; 244; 268	721; 116; 104; 124; 133; 115; 129	33; 3; 7; 6; 5; 6; 6	2342; 405; 378; 388; 415; 359; 397

=== Men - pair ===
Rank	Team	Result			
Rank	Team	All	Clear	X	Total
1st place, gold medalist(s)	East Germany; Eberhard Luther; Horst Bräutigam	1163; 589; 574	626; 302; 324	2; 1; 1	1789; 891; 898
2nd place, silver medalist(s)	Romania; Ilie Băiaş; Iosif Tismănar	1194; 597; 597	604; 307; 297	7; 2; 5	1798; 904; 894
3rd place, bronze medalist(s)	West Germany; Richard Pelikan; Dieter Zieher	1193; 585; 608	582; 294; 288	7; 6; 1	1775; 879; 896
4	Romania; Petre Purge; Ion Micoroiu	1196; 590; 606	578; 287; 291	6; 3; 3	1774; 877; 897
5	Czechoslovakia; Ivo Blaževič; Miroslav Kočárek	1173; 584; 589	593; 324; 269	7; 3; 4	1766; 908; 858
6	Hungary; József Horváth; Imre Kiss	1149; 593; 556	605; 301; 304	3; 1; 2	1754; 894; 860
7	West Germany; Theo Holzmann; Hans Nutz	1165; 593; 572	582; 299; 283	3; 0; 3	1747; 892; 855
8	Yugoslavia; Jože Turk; Miroslav Steržaj	1124; 552; 572	621; 293; 328	4; 4; 0	1745; 845; 900
9	East Germany; Dieter Seifert; Klaus Beyer	1151; 589; 562	584; 306; 278	4; 4; 0	1735; 895; 840
10	Austria; Oswald Frind; Franz Schieder	1157; 557; 600	577; 279; 298	4; 1; 3	1734; 836; 898
11	Yugoslavia; Vlado Šojat; Anton Česen	1164; 565; 599	567; 267; 300	2; 2; 0	1731; 832; 899
12	Hungary; József Rákos; Pál Tösi	1160; 592; 568	569; 314; 255	7; 1; 6	1729; 906; 823
13	Hungary; Béla Csányi; Endre Boros	1150; 569; 581	572; 270; 302	3; 3; 0	1722; 839; 883
14	Romania; Gheorghe Silvestru; Christu Vinatoru	1120; 550; 570	599; 278; 321	6; 5; 1	1719; 828; 891
15	West Germany; Werner Günzel; Josef Beck	1123; 570; 553	587; 304; 283	3; 1; 2	1710; 874; 836
16	Switzerland; Horst Köhler; Walter Mast	1137; 582; 555	557; 300; 257	9; 2; 7	1694; 882; 812
17	Czechoslovakia; Zdeněk Procházka; Emil Bachratý	1117; 561; 556	576; 290; 286	3; 0; 3	1693; 851; 842
18	East Germany; Wöstehoff; Gerhard Grohs	1153; 578; 575	540; 267; 273	5; 2; 3	1693; 845; 848
19	Czechoslovakia; Jaroslav Antonín; Lumír Vostřák	1091; 567; 524	593; 285; 308	3; 2; 1	1684; 852; 832
20	Austria; Herbert Malecek; Ludwig Curda	1151; 582; 569	532; 259; 273	8; 2; 6	1683; 841; 842
21	Yugoslavia; Jože Farkaš; Ivica Juričević	1117; 567; 550	565; 290; 275	6; 2; 4	1682; 857; 825
22	Austria; Franz Permoser; Heinz Ziegler	1122; 582; 540	532; 288; 244	13; 3; 10	1654; 870; 784
23	Italy; Michael Niederstätter; Siegfried Anrather	1097; 537; 560	537; 278; 259	3; 1; 2	1634; 815; 819
24	France; Andre Bruand; Joseph Fritsch	1102; 547; 555	525; 275; 250	9; 5; 4	1627; 822; 805
25	Italy; Karl Schgör; Alois Gruber	1087; 533; 554	535; 258; 277	8; 4; 4	1622; 791; 831
26	Italy; Heinrich Zelger; Raimund Senoner	1120; 562; 558	492; 258; 234	17; 8; 9	1612; 820; 792
27	Switzerland; Otto Benkert; Heinz Gläser	1091; 563; 528	517; 256; 261	9; 4; 5	1608; 819; 789
28	France; Francois Millet; Bernard Bankhauser	1090; 545; 545	511; 264; 247	14; 7; 7	1601; 809; 792
29	Switzerland; Rene Abt; Willi Moser	1086; 541; 545	490; 270; 220	19; 7; 12	1576; 811; 765
30	France; Gerard Hess; Marcel Weber	1075; 531; 544	472; 229; 243	22; 15; 7	1547; 760; 787
31	Sweden; Rune Appelgren; Sture Granström	1051; 517; 534	439; 222; 217	32; 20; 12	1490; 739; 751

=== Women - pair ===
Rank	Team	Result			
Rank	Team	All	Clear	X	Total
1st place, gold medalist(s)	Romania; Elena Trandafir; Cornelia Petrușcă	569; 275; 294	295; 143; 152	1; 0; 1	864; 418; 446
2	East Germany; Gertraude Engelmann; Astrid Wloka	577; 298; 279	286; 155; 131	1; 1; 0	863; 453; 410
3	Yugoslavia; Eva Ludvig; Irena Kaločai	565; 293; 272	280; 122; 158	4; 1; 3	845; 415; 430
4	East Germany; Siegfried Lindner; Annemarie Preller	588; 290; 298	249; 138; 111	5; 1; 4	837; 428; 409
5	West Germany; Edith Neidhardt; Rosemarie Maier	548; 267; 281	280; 149; 131	5; 2; 3	828; 416; 412
6	Austria; Friederike Ernst; Hermine Hafenscherer	556; 287; 269	258; 133; 125	3; 1; 2	814; 420; 394
7	West Germany; Renate Günzel; Ulrike Isenbeck	543; 257; 286	258; 124; 134	10; 7; 3	801; 381; 420
8	East Germany; Helga Leuchtmann; Brigitte Uhle	546; 264; 282	253; 131; 122	7; 3; 4	799; 395; 404
9	Austria; Elfriede Beer; Hermine Dobias	542; 274; 268	253; 132; 121	6; 4; 2	795; 406; 389
10	West Germany; Inge Stadlbauer; Edith Herzog	560; 279; 281	234; 104; 130	10; 6; 4	794; 383; 411
11	Romania; Elena Cernat; Margareta Szemanyi	539; 264; 275	254; 122; 132	8; 5; 3	793; 386; 407
12	Hungary; Borbála Fenyőházi; Zsofia Hursan	555; 281; 274	236; 130; 106	7; 1; 6	791; 411; 380
13	Yugoslavia; Fricka Mačič; Anka Janša	546; 279; 267	243; 119; 124	8; 5; 3	789; 398; 391
14	Romania; Ana Marcu; Crista Szöcs	533; 268; 265	249; 122; 127	8; 4; 4	782; 390; 392
15	Hungary; Kálmánné Nádas; Györgyné Kiss	520; 269; 251	260; 135; 125	7; 3; 4	780; 404; 376
16	Czechoslovakia; Hana Mádlová; Marie Švorbová	541; 270; 271	233; 116; 117	11; 7; 4	774; 386; 388
17	Hungary; Mátyásné Sallai; Julianna Czéher	519; 251; 268	254; 123; 131	11; 6; 5	773; 374; 399
18	Yugoslavia; Nada Kodrnja; Sonja Ocvirk	539; 278; 261	229; 115; 114	13; 7; 6	768; 393; 375
19	Czechoslovakia; Marie Mikulčíková; Eva Jirasová	544; 267; 277	208; 123; 85	15; 4; 11	752; 390; 362
20	Austria; Wilhelmine Kriechbaum; Rosemarie Höller	532; 256; 276	218; 113; 105	13; 8; 5	750; 369; 381
21	Czechoslovakia; Růžena Bucková; Věra Lauerová	517; 256; 261	228; 112; 116	11; 8; 3	745; 368; 377
22	Sweden; Dagny Forslund; Anna Pedersen	490; 243; 247	167; 79; 88	28; 16; 12	657; 322; 335

=== Men - individual ===
Rank	Name	Qualification (Note: Qualification result was the sum of the results from the team and pair competition.)			Final			Result		
Rank	Name	All	Clean	Total	All	Clean	Total	All	Clean	Total
1st place, gold medalist(s)	(West Germany) Dieter Zieher	1215	612	1827	567	334	901	1782	946	2728
2nd place, silver medalist(s)	(East Germany) Eberhard Luther	1164	629	1793	594	339	933	1758	968	2726
3rd place, bronze medalist(s)	(Romania) Christu Vinatoru	1146	614	1760	613	341	954	1759	955	2714
4	(Hungary) József Rákos	1185	626	1811	603	297	900	1788	923	2711
5	(Socialist Federal Republic of Yugoslavia) Miroslav Steržaj	1156	644	1800	582	316	898	1738	960	2698
6	(Czechoslovakia) Ivo Blaževič	1156	630	1786	576	317	893	1732	947	2679
7	(East Germany) Dieter Seifert	1199	601	1800	590	285	875	1789	886	2675
8	(Socialist Federal Republic of Yugoslavia) Anton Česen	1173	584	1757	595	319	914	1768	903	2671
9	(East Germany) Horst Bräutigam	1150	611	1761	600	307	907	1750	918	2668
10	(Hungary) József Horváth	1158	627	1785	580	294	874	1738	921	2659
11	(West Germany) Theo Holzmann	1187	571	1758	581	314	895	1768	885	2653
12	(Czechoslovakia) Jaroslav Antonín	1172	549	1721	592	337	929	1764	886	2650
13	(West Germany) Richard Pelikan	1161	585	1746	577	325	902	1738	910	2648
14	(Romania) Ilie Băiaş	1171	581	1752	587	308	895	1758	889	2647
15	(Romania) Ion Micoroiu	1199	580	1779	557	309	866	1756	889	2645
16	(Czechoslovakia) Miroslav Kočárek	1162	580	1742	589	304	893	1751	884	2635
17	(West Germany) Hans Nutz	1160	565	1725	594	304	898	1754	869	2623
18	(Romania) Iosif Tismănar	1152	577	1729	604	289	893	1756	866	2622
19	(East Germany) Klaus Beyer	1151	572	1723	577	314	891	1728	886	2614
20	(West Germany) Werner Günzel	1150	595	1745	570	299	869	1720	894	2614
21	(Austria) Franz Schieder	1183	584	1767	569	271	840	1752	855	2607
22	(West Germany) Josef Beck	1151	584	1735	547	311	858	1698	895	2593
23	(Hungary) Imre Kiss	1125	601	1726	546	306	852	1671	907	2578
24	(Romania) Petre Purge	1167	579	1746	564	267	831	1731	846	2577
25	(Austria) Herbert Malecek	1146	563	1709	575	271	846	1721	834	2555
26	(Hungary) Endre Boros	1142	590	1732	549	272	821	1691	862	2553
27	(Romania) Gheorghe Silvestru	1153	555	1708	565	262	827	1718	817	2535
28	(Socialist Federal Republic of Yugoslavia) Jože Turk	1125	576	1701						
29	(Austria) Ludwig Curda	1138	563	1701						
30	(Czechoslovakia) Lumír Vostřák	1087	613	1700						
31	(Switzerland) Horst Köhler	1135	563	1698						
32	(East Germany) Gerhard Grohs	1130	565	1695						
33	(Italy) Siegfried Anrather	1115	574	1689						
34	(Socialist Federal Republic of Yugoslavia) Jože Farkaš	1115	573	1688						
35	(Austria) Oswald Frind	1112	571	1683						
36	(Socialist Federal Republic of Yugoslavia) Vlado Šojat	1137	541	1678						
37	(Hungary) Béla Csányi	1138	540	1678						
38	(Socialist Federal Republic of Yugoslavia) Ivica Juričević	1124	547	1671						
39	(Hungary) Pál Tősi	1132	538	1670						
40	(Italy) Alois Gruber	1114	550	1664						
41	(Czechoslovakia) Emil Bachratý	1102	559	1661						
42	(France) Andre Bruand	1122	537	1659						
43	(France) Joseph Fritsch	1131	510	1641						
44	(Italy) Michael Niederstätter	1083	545	1628						
45	(Switzerland) Walter Mast	1113	514	1627						
46	(Switzerland) Rene Abt	1101	512	1613						
47	(Italy) Karl Schgör	1093	506	1599						
48	(France) Marcel Weber	1099	488	1587						
49	(France) Gerard Hess	1088	466	1554						
50	(Switzerland) Heinz Gläser	1061	482	1543						
51	(Switzerland) Willi Moser	1083	460	1543						
52	(Austria) Franz Permoser	582	288	870						
53	(Czechoslovakia) Zdeněk Procházka	561	290	851						
54	(East Germany) Wöstehoff	578	267	845						
55	(East Germany) Helfried Hegenbart	568	267	835						
56	(Austria) Walter Günanger	545	275	820						
57	(Italy) Heinrich Zelger	562	258	820						
58	(Switzerland) Otto Benkert	563	256	819						
59	(Austria) Rudolf Hofer	555	263	818						
60	(France) Francois Millet	545	264	809						
61	(Czechoslovakia) Imrich Mihál	551	250	801						
62	(Italy) Erwin Marseiler	545	253	798						
63	(Italy) Alfred Prucker	545	249	794						
64	(France) Bernard Bankhauser	545	247	792						
65	(Italy) Raimund Senoner	558	234	792						
66	(Austria) Heinz Ziegler	540	244	784						
67	(France) Andre Pierre	544	233	777						
68	(Switzerland) Kurt Friedli	533	233	766						
69	(France) Adolpfe Cassel	528	234	762						
70	(Sweden) Sture Granström	534	217	751						
71	(Sweden) Rune Appelgren	517	222	739						

=== Women - individual ===
Rank	Name	Qualification (Note: Qualification result was the sum of the results from the team and pair competition.)			Final			Result		
Rank	Name	All	Clean	Total	All	Clean	Total	All	Clean	Total
1st place, gold medalist(s)	(Romania) Cornelia Petruşcă	577	304	881	296	143	439	873	447	1320
2nd place, silver medalist(s)	(Romania) Elena Trandafir	571	273	844	280	150	430	851	423	1274
3rd place, bronze medalist(s)	(East Germany) Siegfried Lindner	574	261	835	277	149	426	851	410	1261
4	(East Germany) Gertraude Engelmann	588	266	854	272	133	405	860	399	1259
5	(Socialist Federal Republic of Yugoslavia) Irena Kaločai	554	291	845	281	122	403	835	413	1248
6	(Hungary) Kálmánné Nádas	563	261	824	292	130	422	855	391	1246
7	(West Germany) Edith Herzog	562	268	830	279	133	412	841	401	1242
8	(East Germany) Astrid Wloka	548	275	823	294	123	417	842	398	1240
9	(West Germany) Edith Neidhardt	532	281	813	296	125	421	828	406	1234
10	(Czechoslovakia) Marie Švorbová	551	254	805	256	168	424	807	422	1229
11	(Romania) Crista Szöcs	551	253	804	297	124	421	848	377	1225
12	(East Germany) Helga Leuchtmann	522	279	801	293	125	418	815	404	1219
13	(East Germany) Brigitte Uhle	590	235	825	279	115	394	869	350	1219
14	(Romania) Ana Marcu	551	278	829	259	123	382	810	401	1211
15	(Austria) Friederike Ernst	579	236	815	274	119	393	853	355	1208
16	(Socialist Federal Republic of Yugoslavia) Eva Ludvig	582	238	820	262	115	377	844	353	1197
17	(East Germany) Annemarie Preller	561	249	810	272	114	386	833	363	1196
18	(West Germany) Ulrike Isenbeck	568	248	816	270	110	380	838	358	1196
19	(Hungary) Julianna Czéher	543	266	809	262	117	379	805	383	1188
20	(Austria) Elfriede Beer	543	256	799	272	116	388	815	372	1187
21	(West Germany) Renate Günzel	558	242	800	274	112	386	832	354	1186
22	(Czechoslovakia) Hana Mádlová	549	247	796						
23	(Socialist Federal Republic of Yugoslavia) Fricka Mačič	547	248	795						
24	(West Germany) Inge Stadlbauer	551	244	795						
25	(Hungary) Borbála Fenyőházi	561	234	795						
26	(Czechoslovakia) Eva Jirasová	569	223	792						
27	(Austria) Hermine Dobias	555	234	789						
28	(Austria) Hermine Hafenscherer	543	245	788						
29	(Romania) Margareta Szemanyi	548	238	786						
30	(West Germany) Rosemarie Maier	538	243	781						
31	(Socialist Federal Republic of Yugoslavia) Nada Kodrnja	542	239	781						
32	(Romania) Elena Cernat	538	242	780						
33	(Hungary) Zsofia Hursan	560	220	780						
34	(Austria) Rosemarie Höller	551	227	778						
35	(Czechoslovakia) Marie Mikulčíková	531	243	774						
36	(Hungary) Mátyásné Sallai	536	237	773						
37	(Socialist Federal Republic of Yugoslavia) Anka Janša	541	228	769						
38	(Hungary) Györgyné Kiss	518	241	759						
39	(Austria) Wilhelmine Kriechbaum	531	228	759						
40	(Czechoslovakia) Věra Lauerová	523	232	755						
41	(Socialist Federal Republic of Yugoslavia) Sonja Ocvirk	261	114	375						
42	(Czechoslovakia) Růžena Bucková	256	112	368						
43	(Socialist Federal Republic of Yugoslavia) Marija Popović	244	115	359						
44	(Czechoslovakia) Zdena Těthalová	263	89	352						
45	(Sweden) Anna Pedersen	247	88	335						
46	(Sweden) Dagny Forslund	243	79	322						

== Medal summary ==
=== Medal table ===
* Host nation (Italy)

Rank	Nation	Gold	Silver	Bronze	Total
1	Romania (ROU)	3	2	1	6
2	West Germany (FRG)	2	0	2	4
3	East Germany (GDR)	1	4	1	6
4	Hungary (HUN)	0	0	1	1
4	Yugoslavia (YUG)	0	0	1	1
Totals (5 entries)		6	6	6	18

=== Men ===
Event	Gold	Silver	Bronze
Team	West Germany; Josef Beck; Werner Günzel; Theo Holzmann; Hans Nutz; Richard Pelikan; Dieter Zieher	East Germany; Klaus Beyer; Horst Bräutigam; Gerhard Grohs; Helfried Hegenbart; Eberhard Luther; Dieter Seifert	Hungary; Endre Boros; Béla Csányi; József Horváth; Imre Kiss; József Rákos; Pál Tösi
Pair	East Germany; Horst Bräutigam; Eberhard Luther	Romania; Ilie Băiaş; Iosif Tismănar	West Germany; Richard Pelikan; Dieter Zieher
Individual	Dieter Zieher; West Germany	Eberhard Luther; East Germany	Christu Vinatoru; Romania

=== Women ===
Event	Gold	Silver	Bronze
Team	Romania; Elena Cernat; Ana Marcu; Cornelia Petruşcă; Margareta Szemanyi; Crista Szöcs; Elena Trandafir	East Germany; Gertraude Engelmann; Helga Leuchtmann; Siegfried Lindner; Annemarie Preller; Brigitte Uhle; Astrid Wloka	West Germany; Renate Günzel; Edith Herzog; Ulrike Isenbeck; Rosemarie Maier; Edith Neidhardt; Inge Stadlbauer
Pair	Romania; Cornelia Petruşcă; Elena Trandafir	East Germany; Gertraude Engelmann; Brigitte Uhle	Yugoslavia; Irena Kalocai; Eva Ludvig
Individual	Cornelia Petruşcă; Romania	Elena Trandafir; Romania	Siegfried Lindner; East Germany
