= 1957 World Ninepin Bowling Classic Championships =

European bowling competition

3rd World Ninepin Bowling Classic Championships
- Host city: Vienna
- Country: Austria
- Nations: 9
- Athletes: 89
- Events: 4
- Opening: June 9, 1957
- Closing: June 14, 1957

The 1957 World Ninepin Bowling Classic Championships was the third edition of the championships and was held in Vienna, Austria, from 9 to 14 June 1957.

In the men's competition the title was won by Yugoslavia in the team competition and by Ion Micoroiu (Romania) in the individual event. In the women's competition the title was won by Austria in the team competition and by Gertrude Schmidka (Austria) in the individual event. Hungary and Romania entered its first championship.

== Participating teams ==
=== Men ===
- Austria
- Czechoslovakia
- East Germany
- France
- Hungary
- Romania
- Switzerland
- West Germany
- Yugoslavia

=== Women ===
- Austria
- Hungary
- West Germany
- Yugoslavia

== Results ==
=== Men - team ===
The competition was played with 200 throws mixed (100 full, 100 clean). Teams were composed of 6 competitors
and the scores were added up.

Rank	Team	Result		
Rank	Team	All	Clean	Total
1st place, gold medalist(s)	Yugoslavia; Vladimir Martelanc; Leon Grom; Avgust Likovnik; Rajko Starc; Dujam Smoljanović; Stanislav Pogelšek	3361; 560; 526; 553; 574; 577; 571	1685; 271; 293; 260; 294; 279; 288	5046; 831; 819; 813; 868; 856; 859
2nd place, silver medalist(s)	Hungary; Alajos Escher; János Brachmann; György Gyebrovszky; István Bubori; Jenő Révész; József Szabó	3408; 567; 530; 567; 554; 571; 619	1592; 244; 256; 263; 275; 279; 275	5000; 811; 786; 830; 829; 850; 894
3rd place, bronze medalist(s)	East Germany; Gerhard Grohs; Rudolf Franke; Bernd Rumpf; Herbert Uhlmann; Eberhard Luther; Hans Grettner	3296; 545; 580; 545; 560; 531; 535	1555; 263; 288; 223; 264; 257; 260	4851; 808; 868; 768; 824; 788; 795
4	Czechoslovakia; Jaroslav Šimůnek; Miroslav Kočárek; Stanislav Kučera; Štefan Fazika; František Prejsler; Lumír Vostřák	3312; 540; 514; 555; 551; 571; 581	1512; 257; 248; 255; 248; 255; 249	4824; 797; 762; 810; 799; 826; 830
5	Austria; Friedrich Beschl; Johann Binder; Alexander Hofmann; Ludwig Curda; Karl Kuba; Hans Haidvogel	3183; 545; 542; 504; 531; 560; 501	1584; 239; 237; 271; 254; 271; 312	4767; 784; 779; 775; 785; 831; 813
6	Romania; Ion Micoroiu; Tiberiu Szemanyi; Teodor Mihailescu; Francise Micola; Alexandru Gomoiu; Alexandru Andrei	3079; 535; 531; 483; 548; 499; 483	1538; 247; 256; 245; 270; 258; 262	4617; 782; 787; 728; 818; 757; 745
7	West Germany; Josef Bröhl; Werner Stefan; Albert Pfeiffer; Alfred Scherf; Walter Heinlein; Hermann Raethel	3082; 508; 501; 528; 529; 484; 532	1406; 226; 221; 263; 239; 191; 266	4488; 734; 722; 791; 768; 675; 798
8	France; Rene Klein; Andre Weyer; Frederic Zimmermann; Rene Weiss; Pierre Neff; Charles Metzger	3084; 478; 497; 525; 549; 477; 558	1362; 186; 213; 242; 240; 221; 260	4446; 664; 710; 767; 789; 698; 818
9	Switzerland; Giovanni Barisi; Alfred Reisen; Josef Schüler; Fritz Brönimann; Paul Brühlmann; Fritz Bölstreli	2939; 447; 494; 521; 502; 514; 461	1173; 171; 176; 193; 220; 218; 195	4112; 618; 670; 714; 722; 732; 656

=== Women - team ===
The competition was played with 100 throws mixed (50 full, 50 clean). Teams were composed of 6 competitors
and the scores were added up.

Rank	Team	Result		
Rank	Team	All	Clean	Total
1st place, gold medalist(s)	Austria; Wilhelmine Hensel; Franziska Haydn; Rosa Kesselgruber; Maria Schmoranzer; Steffi Kriha; Hedwig Biedermann	1610; 257; 277; 282; 262; 282; 250	723; 124; 123; 121; 108; 115; 132	2333; 381; 400; 403; 370; 397; 382
2nd place, silver medalist(s)	East Germany; Hannelore Cebulla; Susi Herchert; Elisabeth Bannert; Charlote Zeibig; Edith Schulze; Elisabeth Dornack	1782; 521; 239; 243; 267; 250; 262	694; 115; 121; 106; 122; 116; 114	2476; 636; 360; 349; 389; 366; 376
3rd place, bronze medalist(s)	Hungary; Anna Oláh; Anna Vojna; Józsefiné Kiss; Anna Huzián; Gyuláné Schrett; Emma Molnár	1521; 238; 255; 234; 271; 248; 275	668; 104; 119; 122; 113; 106; 104	2189; 342; 374; 356; 384; 354; 379
4	Yugoslavia; Elsa Novak; Zita Pipinić; Bernada Smrajc; Cvetka Čadež; Franciška Erjavec; Barbara Bulić	1472; 265; 222; 242; 257; 223; 263	623; 101; 87; 107; 105; 115; 108	2095; 366; 309; 349; 362; 338; 371

=== Men - individual ===
Rank	Name	Nation	All	Clean	Total
1st place, gold medalist(s)	Ion Micoroiu	Romania	599	278	877
2nd place, silver medalist(s)	František Prejsler	Czechoslovakia	552	316	868
3rd place, bronze medalist(s)	Jaroslav Šimůnek	Czechoslovakia	562	304	866
4.	Dujam Smoljanović	Yugoslavia	592	269	861
5.	Hans Haidvogel	Austria	568	284	852
6.	Bernd Rumpf	East Germany	570	276	846
7.	György Gyebrovszky	Hungary	584	256	840
8.	Stanislav Kučera	Czechoslovakia	555	281	836
9.	Miroslav Steržaj	Yugoslavia	554	280	834
10.	Karl Kuba	Austria	599	275	834
11.	Hermann Raethel	Austria	575	250	825
12.	Friedrich Beschl	Austria	540	281	821
13.	Francise Micole	Romania	529	291	820
14.	Eberhard Luther	East Germany	546	273	819
15.	Eberhard Hofmann	East Germany	569	250	819
16.	Gerhard Grohs	East Germany	544	273	817
17.	Vladimir Martelanc	Yugoslavia	533	282	815
18.	Alajos Escher	Hungary	561	253	814
19.	Jenő Révész	Hungary	538	275	813
20.	Rajko Starc	Yugoslavia	557	254	811
21.	Alexandru Gomoiu	Romania	525	285	810
22.	Wolfgang Holewa	East Germany	539	270	809
23.	Štefan Fazika	Czechoslovakia	552	256	808
24.	József Szabó	Hungary	527	280	807
25.	Avgust Likovnik	Yugoslavia	528	278	806
26.	Stanislav Pogelšek	Yugoslavia	545	261	806
27.	János Brachmann	Hungary	531	273	804
28.	Charles Metzger	France	560	242	802
29.	Friedrich Marx	Austria	533	266	799
30.	Frederic Zimmermann	France	535	264	799
31.	Tiberiu Szmanyi	Romania	559	240	799
32.	Herbert Uhlmann	East Germany	559	240	799
33.	Walter Franke	East Germany	523	264	787
34.	Lumír Vostřák	Czechoslovakia	531	250	781
35.	Alexandru Andrei	Romania	515	261	776
36.	Victor Felszeghi	Romania	551	220	771
37.	István Bubori	Hungary	545	222	767
38.	Josef Bröhl	West Germany	530	236	766
39.	Miroslav Kočárek	Czechoslovakia	516	246	762
40.	Robert Schneider	France	542	219	761
41.	Rene Klein	France	559	201	760
42.	Josef Schüler	Switzerland	521	229	750
43.	Karl Schlager	Austria	518	229	747
44.	Alfred Scherf	West Germany	510	227	737
45.	Rudolf Dietner	Austria	537	199	736
46.	Werner Steffan	West Germany	504	227	731
47.	Fritz Bösterli	Switzerland	496	230	726
48.	Paul Brühlmann	Switzerland	508	216	724
49.	Andre Weyer	France	491	219	710
50.	Pierre Neff	France	495	215	710
51.	Walter Heinlein	West Germany	494	211	705
52.	Walter Malterer	West Germany	485	214	699
53.	Fritz Brönimann	Switzerland	499	198	697
54.	Giovanni Barisi	Switzerland	489	180	669
55.	Willi Streun	Switzerland	424	169	593

=== Women - individual ===
Rank	Name	Nation	All	Clean	Total
1st place, gold medalist(s)	Gertrude Schmidka	Austria	272	123	395
2nd place, silver medalist(s)	Zita Pipinić	Yugoslavia	272	109	381
3rd place, bronze medalist(s)	Hermine Biedermann	Austria	258	122	380
4.	Traude Brandfellner	Austria	258	122	380
5.	Barbara Bulić	Yugoslavia	271	107	378
6.	Margarete Wallner	Austria	261	115	376
7.	Anna Oláh	Hungary	268	107	375
8.	Maria Schmoranzer	Austria	266	107	373
9.	Elsa Novak	Yugoslavia	255	117	372
10.	Emma Molnár	Hungary	253	115	368
11.	Susi Herchert	East Germany	257	111	368
12.	Hannelore Cebulla	East Germany	256	111	367
13.	Bernada Smrajc	Yugoslavia	252	112	364
14.	Cvetka Čadež	Yugoslavia	249	112	361
15.	Edith Schulze	East Germany	255	104	359
16.	Charlotte Zeibig	East Germany	258	96	354
17.	Elisabeth Bannert	East Germany	233	117	350
18.	Elisabeth Dornack	East Germany	234	113	347
19.	Anna Huzián	Hungary	235	107	342
20.	Franciška Erjavec	Yugoslavia	233	106	339
21.	Anna Vojna	Hungary	237	101	338
22.	Gyuláné Schrett	Hungary	237	97	334
23.	Marie Langmayer	Austria	228	105	333
24.	Mandica Asic	Yugoslavia	256	73	329
25.	Józsefiné Kiss	Hungary	224	99	323

== Medal summary ==
=== Medal table ===
* Host nation (Host nation)

Rank	Nation	Gold	Silver	Bronze	Total
1	Austria (AUT)*	2	0	1	3
2	Yugoslavia (YUG)	1	1	0	2
3	Romania (ROU)	1	0	0	1
4	Czechoslovakia (TCH)	0	1	1	2
4	East Germany (GDR)	0	1	1	2
4	Hungary (HUN)	0	1	1	2
Totals (6 entries)		4	4	4	12

=== Men ===
Event	Gold	Silver	Bronze
Individual	Ion Micoroiu; Romania	František Prejsler; Czechoslovakia	Jaroslav Šimůnek; Czechoslovakia
Team	Yugoslavia; Vladimir Martelanc; Leon Grom; Avgust Likovnik; Rajko Starc; Dujam Smoljanović; Stanislav Pogelšek	Hungary; Alajos Escher; János Brachmann; György Gyebrovszky; István Bubori; Jenő Révész; József Szabó	East Germany; Gerhard Grohs; Rudolf Franke; Bernd Rumpf; Herbert Uhlmann; Eberhard Luther; Hans Grettner

=== Women ===
Event	Gold	Silver	Bronze
Individual	Gertrude Schmidka; Austria	Zita Pipinić; Yugoslavia	Hermine Biedermann; Austria
Team	Austria; Wilhelmine Hensel; Franziska Haydn; Rosa Kesselgruber; Maria Schmoranzer; Steffi Kriha; Hedwig Biedermann	East Germany; Hannelore Cebulla; Susi Herchert; Elisabeth Bannert; Charlote Zeibig; Edith Schulze; Elisabeth Dornack	Hungary; Anna Oláh; Anna Vojna; Józsefiné Kiss; Anna Huzián; Gyuláné Schrett; Emma Molnár
