= 1953 World Ninepin Bowling Classic Championships =

European bowling competition

1st World Ninepin Bowling Classic Championships
- Host city: Belgrade
- Country: SFR Yugoslavia
- Nations: 7
- Athletes: 48
- Events: 4
- Opening: June 21, 1953
- Closing: June 24, 1953
- Opened by: Heinz Kropp
- Main venue: KK Partizan

The 1953 World Ninepin Bowling Classic Championships was the first edition of the championships and were held in Belgrade, Yugoslavia, from 21–24 June 1953. Germany sent a united team composed of players from the GDR and the FRG.

In the men's competition the title was won by Yugoslavia in the team competition and by Alfred Baierl (Austria) in the individual event. In the women's competition the title was won by Austria in the team competition and by Jelena Šincek (Yugoslavia) in the individual event.

== Participating teams ==
=== Men ===
- Austria
- Germany
- Finland
- France
- (Saar Protectorate) Saar
- Switzerland
- Yugoslavia

=== Women ===
- Austria
- Yugoslavia

== Results ==
=== Men - team ===
The competition was played with 200 throws mixed (100 full, 100 clean). Teams were composed of 6 competitors
and the scores were added up.

Rank	Team	Result
1st place, gold medalist(s)	Yugoslavia; Dujam Smoljanović; Stanko Hladnik; Vlado Martelanc; Dušan Denić; Eugen Kobal; Stanko Pogelšek	4997; 861; 840; 819; 820; 840; 817
2nd place, silver medalist(s)	Austria; Friedrich Beschl; Hans Portadar; Wilhelm Donath; Hans Haidvogel; Anton Czech; Karl Fehr	4832; 839; 817; 781; 802; 755; 838
3rd place, bronze medalist(s)	Germany; Hans Sonntag; Philipp Noll; Günther Lehmann; Hans Dammann; Adolf Wigger; Ludwig Schmid	4754; 762; 839; 759; 805; 795; 794
4	France; Victor Chatelain; Pierre Neff; Raymond Brechenmacher; Albert Lamey; Rene Weiss; Charles Metzger	4476; 698; 766; 743; 728; 739; 802
5	(Saar Protectorate) Saar (combined) (Note: The Saar team has only five players. Therefore it was completed by Swiss player.); Jacob Theisen; Johan Gäbges; Josef Assmann; Peter Heinz; Artur Notz; Josef Stocker (SUI)	4297; 690; 713; 792; 779; 692; 631
6	Switzerland; Jakob Aschwander; Fritz Bröningmann; Fritz Stutz; Fritz Bölsterly; Alfred Bröhi; Alfred Riesen	4248; 715; 716; 734; 701; 691; 691

=== Women - team ===
The competition was played with 100 throws mixed (50 full, 50 clean). Teams were composed of 6 competitors
and the scores were added up.

Rank	Team	Result
1st place, gold medalist(s)	Austria; Anna Reitzer; Anna Heinzel; Rosa Kesselgruber; Maria Zimmel; Steffi Weiss; Maria Schmoranzer	2206; 358; 346; 339; 402; 395; 366
2nd place, silver medalist(s)	Yugoslavia; Marija Šimunić; Anica Švajger; Ankica Puharić; Franciška Erjavec; Jelica Šincek; Barica Bulić	2186; 386; 357; 338; 345; 386; 374

=== Men - individual ===
Rank	Name	Nation	Score
1st place, gold medalist(s)	Alfred Beierl	Austria	862
2nd place, silver medalist(s)	Ludwig Schmid	Germany	858
3rd place, bronze medalist(s)	Zvonimir Kružić	Yugoslavia	851
4.	Stanko Pogelšek	Yugoslavia	839
5.	Vlado Martelanc	Yugoslavia	835
6.	Evgen Kobal	Yugoslavia	832
7.	Alfred Wigger	Germany	831
8.	Hans Kreuzer	Austria	829
9.	Miljenko Bobanac	Yugoslavia	824
10.	Stanko Hladnik	Yugoslavia	819
11.	Karl Fehrer	Austria	806
12.	Anton Czech	Austria	797
13.	Hans Heindel	Austria	791
14.	Charles Metzger	France	782
15.	Fritz Bölsterli	Switzerland	782
16.	Peter Heinz	(Saar Protectorate) Saar	779
17.	Philipp Noll	Germany	773
18.	Hans Dammann	Germany	770
19.	Josef Assmann	(Saar Protectorate) Saar	768
20.	Rene Weiss	France	764
21.	Karl Aschwander	Switzerland	760
22.	Hans Maier	Austria	753
23.	Albert Lamey	France	742
24.	Raymond Brechenmacher	France	732
25.	Wilhelm Hübner	Germany	731
26.	Hans Sonntag	Germany	727
27.	Pierre Neff	France	722
28.	Victor Chatelain	France	709
29.	Fritz Brönimann	Switzerland	688
30.	Arthur Notz	(Saar Protectorate) Saar	685
31.	Jacob Theisen	(Saar Protectorate) Saar	679
32.	Johann Gäbges	(Saar Protectorate) Saar	667
33.	Kauko Ahlström	Finland	654
34.	Fritz Böhli	Switzerland	635
35.	Josef Stocker	Switzerland	632
36.	Arvi Tikkanen	Finland	600

=== Women - individual ===
Rank	Name	Nation	Score
1st place, gold medalist(s)	Jelena Šincek	Yugoslavia	417 (WR)
2nd place, silver medalist(s)	Maria Schmoranzer	Austria	386
3rd place, bronze medalist(s)	Maria Zimmerl	Austria	379
4.	Steffi Weiss	Austria	375
5.	Wetti Knapp	Austria	361
6.	Anna Heinzel	Austria	359
7.	Barbara Bulić	Yugoslavia	359
8.	Marija Šimunić	Yugoslavia	354
9.	Zinka Tepina	Yugoslavia	350
10.	Hedwig Biedermann	Austria	333
11.	Ana Švajger	Yugoslavia	331
12.	Marija Gašparić	Yugoslavia	330

== Medal summary ==
=== Medal table ===
* Host nation (Host nation)

Rank	Nation	Gold	Silver	Bronze	Total
1	Austria (AUT)	2	2	1	5
2	Yugoslavia (YUG)*	2	1	1	4
3	Germany (GER)	0	1	1	2
Totals (3 entries)		4	4	3	11

=== Men ===
Event	Gold	Silver	Bronze
Team	Yugoslavia; Dujam Smoljanović; Stanko Hladnik; Vlado Martelanc; Dušan Denić; Eugen Kobal; Stanko Pogelšek	Austria; Friedrich Beschl; Hans Portadar; Wilhelm Donath; Hans Haidvogel; Anton Czech; Karl Fehr	Germany; Hans Sonntag; Philipp Noll; Günther Lehmann; Hans Dammann; Adolf Wigger; Ludwig Schmid
Individual	Alfred Beierl; Austria	Ludwig Schmid; Germany	Zvonimir Kružić; Yugoslavia

=== Women ===
Event	Gold	Silver	Bronze
Team	Austria; Anna Reitzer; Anna Heinzel; Rosa Kesselgruber; Maria Zimmel; Steffi Weiss; Maria Schmoranzer	Yugoslavia; Ljerka Prezelj; Anika Jakovec; Ruža Vaštag; Jelena Šincek; Franciška Erjavec; Barbara Bulić	
Individual	Jelena Šincek; Yugoslavia	Maria Schmoranzer; Austria	Maria Zimmerl; Austria
