= Nikola Dragaš =

Croatian nine-pin bowling player

Nikola Dragaš (born 1 November 1944) is a Croatian 9 pin bowling player.

== Career ==
Dragaš competed for the KK Medveščak from Zagreb. In 1972, 1974 and 1976 he was World Champion in the individual class. With Miro Steržaj he competed in pairs three times and they were always second. In 1988, he came first with Boris Urbanc in a pairs championship.
