= Grom =

Grom may refer to:

== Military ==
- 2A28 Grom, a Soviet/Russian low pressure gun
- 9×30mm Grom (Russian: Гром, lit. 'Thunder'), a Russian sub-machine gun bullet
- Kronshtadt Grom, a Russian jet fighter UCAV drone

=== Units ===
- JW GROM, a Polish special forces unit
- Grom Team (Russian: Гром, lit. 'Thunder'), a unit of Vympel (V-Directorate of the Soviet KGB)

=== Missiles ===
- PZR Grom (Polish: Thunder), a Polish man-portable anti-aircraft missile
- Kh-23 Grom (Russian: Х-23 Гром, lit. 'Kh-23 Thunder'; NATO: AS-7 'Kerry'), Soviet air-to-surface missile
  - Grom (Serbo-Croatian: Thunder), a Yugoslav/Serbian version of the Kh-23 air-to-surface missile
- Kh-36 Grom (Russian: Х-36 Гром, lit. 'Kh-36 Thunder'), a Soviet guided glide bomb
- P-750 Grom, a Soviet cruise missile
- Hrim-2 Grom, a Ukrainian short-range ballistic missile

=== Warships ===
- ORP Grom, several ships of the Polish Navy
- Grom-class destroyer, a Polish destroyer class
- Grom-class destroyer (1939), a Polish WW2 destroyer class
- Russian ship Grom (1765), a Donder-class bomb vessel; see List of ship launches in 1765
- Russian destroyer Grom, a WW1 Russian Orfey-class destroyer
- Grom-class frigate (Project 1244.1 Novik), a Russian patrol ship class

== People and characters ==
- Grommet (sportsperson) (shortened: grom), a nickname for young participants in extreme sports

=== Persons ===
- GroM, a drummer for Norwegian black metal band Ancient (band)
- Józef Chyliński (1904—1985; codenamed "Grom"), Polish resistance fighter
- Grom Gravalid (ringname: Gromguten), a wrestler from Høydalsmo, Tokke, Telemark, Norway
- Franc Grom, Slovenian artist
- Jacob de Grom (born 1988), U.S. baseball player
- Leon Grom, bronze medallist for Yugoslavia at the 1966 World Ninepin Bowling Classic Championships
- Zaza Grom, the ringname of Georgian MMA fighter Zaza Tkeshelashvili (born 1965)

=== Fictional characters ===
- Grom, an alter-ego of Marvel Comics character Overmind (comics)
- Grom, a fictional character from the comic book Hellboy: The Chained Coffin and Others
- Grom, a fictional character from the 2007 Russian film Trackman
- Grommash "Grom" Hellscream, a fictional character from the videogame series Warcraft
- Colonel Grom, a fictional character from the 2002 videogame Grom: Terror in Tibet
- Igor Grom, a fictional Saint Petersburg police major in the Russian comic book franchise Major Grom

== Places ==
- Grom, Warmian-Masurian Voivodeship, Poland; a village in Gmina Pasym, Szczytno County
- Gromo (Lombard: Gróm), Bergamo, Lombardy, Italy; a commune
- Grøm, Grimstad (town), Grimstad (municipality), Agder County, Norway; a former farmstead
- River Grom, England, UK; a watercourse
- Grom-Bach (German: Grom Brook), Hesse, Germany; a watercourse

== Groups, organizations ==
- Citizen Option for Macedonia (GROM, ГРОМ; Gragjanska оpcija za Makedonija, 'Граѓанска опција за Македониј'), a political party in North Macedonia
- Grom (company), an Italian gelato company
- Grom, a New York band signed by Resistance Records
- Grom Wolsztyn, the Grom soccer team in Wolsztyn, Gmina Wolsztyn, Powiat Wolsztyn, Greater Poland Voivodeship, Poland

=== Police, security services ===
- 'Grom' Team (Russian: Гром, lit. 'Thunder'), a unit of Vympel (V-Directorate of the Russian FSB)
- "Grom" Unit (Russian: «Гром», lit. ''Thunder''), a Spetsnaz narcopolice unit of the Federal Drug Control Service of Russia

== Other uses ==
- Honda Grom, a motorcycle
- Grom (album), a 1996 album by Polish extreme metal band Behemoth
  - "Grom" (song), a 1996 song by Behemoth, the title track off the eponymous album Grom
- Grom: Terror in Tibet, a 2002 videogame
- GROM, Graphics Read Only Memory, a type of memory used in the TI-99/4A Home Computer

== See also ==
- Grome
- Groom (disambiguation)
- Grem
