= Novick =

- Pronunciation: noʊvɪk

Origin
- Origin: Belarus
- Meaning: A newcomer
- Region of origin: Eastern Europe

Novick is a surname originating from Belarus which translates to 'a newcomer to a place'. The surname is most common in the United States, Israel and Argentina.

== People ==
- Edgardo Novick (born 1956), Uruguayan businessman and politician
- Hernán Novick (born 1988), Uruguayan footballer
- Irv Novick (1916–2004), American comic book artist
- Jill Novick (born 1966), American actress
- Kimberly A. Novick, American environmental scientist
- Lynn Novick (born 1962), American director and producer of documentary films
- Marcel Novick (born 1983), Uruguayan footballer
- Mason Novick (born 1974), American film producer and talent manager
- Melvin R. Novick (1932–1986), American statistician
- Peter Novick (1934–2012), American historian
- Steve Novick (born 1963), American politician

== Characters ==
- Mike Novick, a character on the television series 24

== See also ==
- Novik (surname)
- Edmond Novicki (born 1912), Polish-born French footballer
- Novickis, a surname
