= Novik =

Novik may refer to:

- Novik (surname)
- Novik (beginner), historical Russian term meaning a teenager from a noble, boyar, or cossack family enlisted to army or Opolchenie
- Russian corvette Novik, a corvette operated by the Imperial Russian Navy from 1856 to September 14, 1863
- Russian cruiser Novik, a cruiser operated by the Imperial Russian Navy from 1899 to 1904. It was later known as the Suzuya
- Russian destroyer Novik, a destroyer operated by the Imperial Russian Navy from 1913 to the Bolshevik Revolution. It was later known as the Yakov Sverdlov and operated by the Soviet Navy, but was sunk in 1941
- Novik-class frigate
- Novik, Iran
