= Chylinski =

Chylinski is a surname. Notable people with the name include:

- Andreas Chyliński (born 1590), Polish composer
- Andrzej Chylinski (born 1960), American racewalker
- Józef Chyliński (1904–1985), Polish soldier and resistance fighter
- Keith J. Chylinski (born 1971), American Catholic prelate
- Melchor Chyliński (1694–1741), Polish Roman Catholic priest
- Michał Chyliński (born 1986), Polish basketball player
- Samuel Bogusław Chyliński (1631–1668), first translator and publisher of the Bible in Lithuanian
- Tadeusz Chyliński (1911–1978), Polish aeroplane designer, constructor and researcher

== See also ==
- Chylinski coat of arms, one of the most ancient Polish coats of arms
