= Animal toilet (disambiguation) =

Animal toilet may refer to:

- Animal latrine, wildlife dedicated defecation site
- Litter box, pet defecation site
- Animal grooming; see Groom (disambiguation)
