= List of tallest buildings in Uruguay =

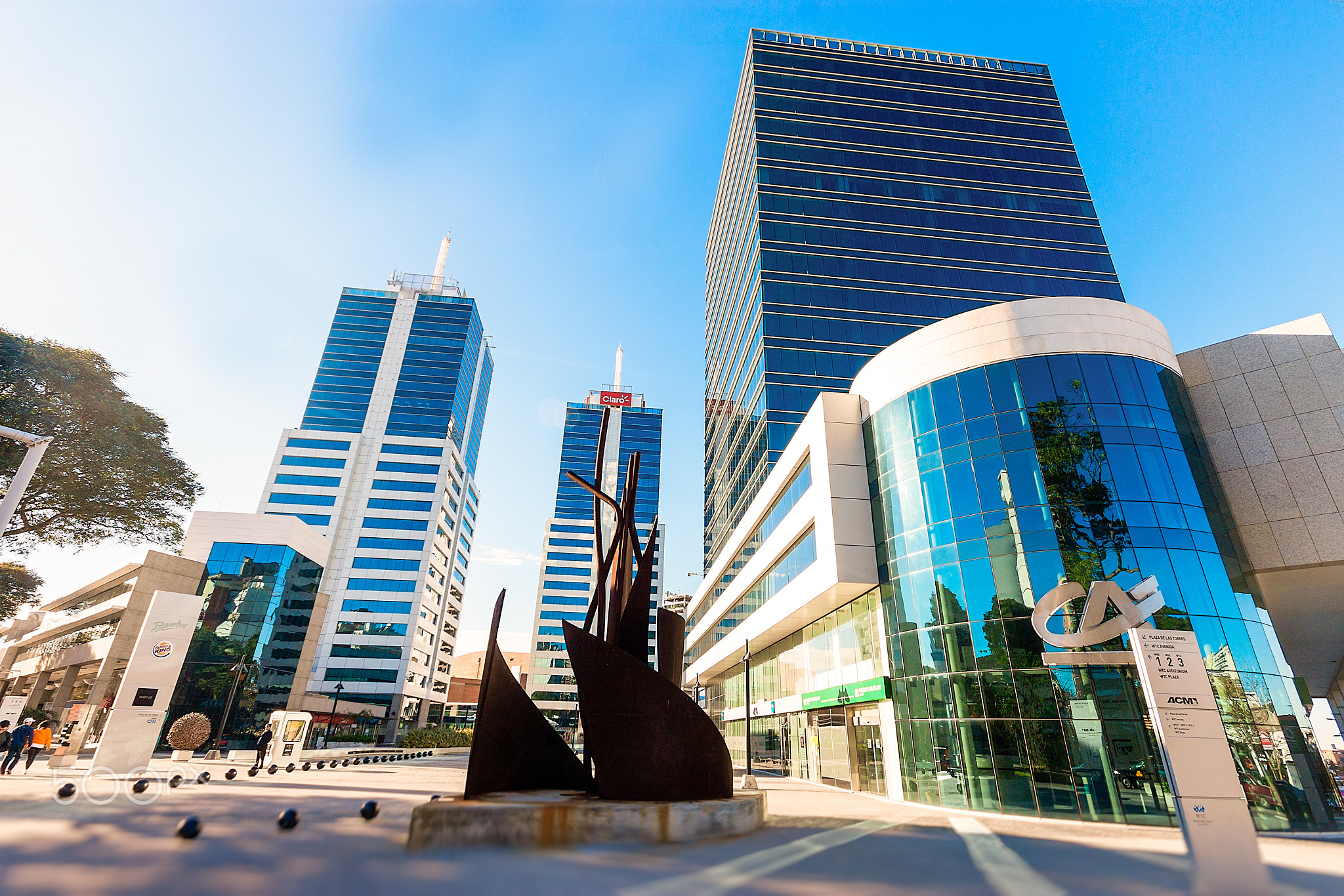
World Trade Center complex in Montevideo.

This list ranks buildings in Uruguay that stand at least 80 metres tall.

== Tallest buildings ==
Was the tallest building in Uruguay upon completion

Rank	Name	Image	City	Height (Note: The heights are estimated. Heights are measured from the base to the maximum structural height of the building, without counting antennas.)	Floors	Year
1	Telecommunications Tower		Montevideo	158 m	35	2002
2	World Trade Center Tower IV		Montevideo	140 m	40	2013
3	World Trade Center Free Zone		Montevideo	115 m	24	2011
4	Radisson Montevideo Victoria Plaza Hotel		Montevideo	115 m	25	1996
5	World Trade Center Tower I		Montevideo	105 m	22	2001
6	World Trade Center Tower II		Montevideo	105 m	22	2002
7	World Trade Center Free Zone II		Montevideo	100 m	20	2020
8	Look Brava		Punta del Este	100 m	30	2015
9	Palacio Salvo		Montevideo	95 m	27	1928
10	World Trade Center Tower III		Montevideo	90 m	19	2009
11	Trump Tower		Punta del Este	85 m	26	2020
12	Edificio Plaza Alemania		Montevideo	80 m	22	2019

== Tallest buildings under construction ==
Rank	Name	Function	City	Height (m)	Height (ft)	Floors	Estimated Completion	Notes
1	Cipriani Resort & Casino I	Residential	Punta del Este	320	1050	60		
2	Cipriani Resort & Casino II	Residential	Punta del Este	240	787	45		
3	Cipriani Resort & Casino III	Residential	Punta del Este	160	524	30		
4	Montevideo Harbour	Residential	Montevideo	120	394	34		
5	Complejo Cosmos	Office	Montevideo	115	377	31	2025	

== See also ==
- List of tallest buildings in South America
