= Novik (surname) =

Novik (Belarusian: Новiк) is a gender-neutral Belarusian surname. Its Russian counterpart is Novikov and its Polish counterpart is Nowik. Notable people with the surname include:

- Aaron Novik (born 1974), American composer, clarinetist and bandleader
- Alyaksandr Novik (born 1975), Belarusian professional footballer
- Alyaksandr Novik (born 1994), Belarusian professional footballer
- Anton Novik (born 1998), Belarusian professional footballer
- Isabella Novik, American mathematician
- Mary Novik, Canadian novelist
- Maryna Novik (born 1984), Belarusian javelin thrower
- Morris S. Novik (1903–1996), Russian-American pioneer in radio
- Naomi Novik (born 1973), American novelist of Polish origins
- Syarhey Novik (born 1993), Belarusian football player
- Tatiana Novik (born 1994), Russian pair skater
- Uladzislau Novik (born 1995), Belarusian track cyclist
- Vitaly Novik (born 1994), Belarusian football player

== See also ==
- Novick, a surname
