= World Trade Center Montevideo =

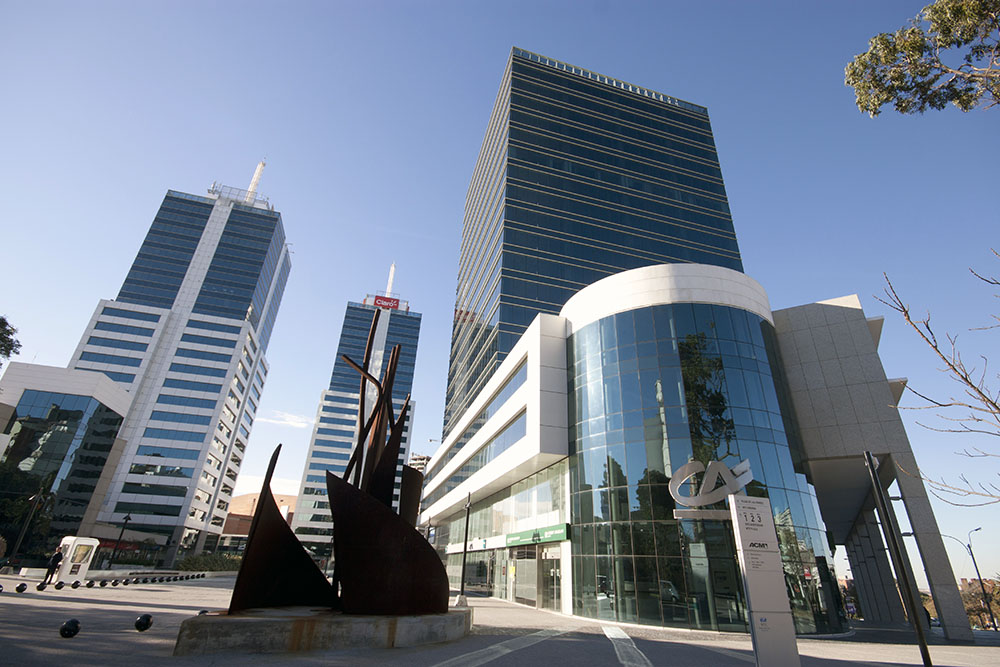
- WTC Montevideo Complex
- Interactive map of the World Trade Center Montevideo area

General information
- Status: Completed
- Type: Offices; Gastronomy and Commercial premises
- Location: Montevideo, Uruguay
- Coordinates: 34°55′14.00″S 56°08′07.53″W
- Opening: 1998

Technical details
- Floor count: 22, 22, 21, 2, 2, 23 and 41

Design and construction
- Architects: Isidoro Singer; Ernesto Kimelman; David Ruben Flom
- Developer: Estudio Luis E. Lecueder
- Main contractor: Roberts&Asoc., Saceem, Ebital

The World Trade Center Montevideo (WTC Montevideo) is a building complex located in Montevideo, Uruguay. It was officially opened in 1998, and renovated between 2002 and 2009.

The official motto is "Work in the best place to live".

== Location ==
The WTC Montevideo is only 30 minutes away from Carrasco International Airport and 15 minutes away from the Port of Montevideo. It is next to Montevideo Shopping, in Buceo, the area of greatest growth in the city in recent years. Avenues of easy traffic flow which surround the Complex guarantee a quick access to it.

The Complex has thus achieved true decentralization in the city, consolidating the trend set by its neighbor, Montevideo Shopping, over 20 years ago by moving the center of gravity of the city.

== Complex ==
To date, WTC Montevideo is composed of three towers; two three-storey buildings called WTC Plaza and WTC Avenue and a large central square called Towers Square.

The WTC 1, is a 22-story, 17.000m2 tower inaugurated in 1998. That same year the WTC Avenue and WTC Auditorium were raised. This former is 2 stories tall, 5600 square meters in total, and the latter is attached to WTC 2.

WTC 2 was inaugurated in 2002 and is identical to WTC 1. Combined, they are the second talles twin towers in Uruguay, only surpassed by the NuevoCentro Towers. 7 years later, in 2009, WTC 3, the WTC Plaza and the Towers Square were inaugurated. WTC 3, located between the avenues Luis Alberto de Herrera and 26 de Marzo is 19 stories tall and has 27.000 square meters of total office space.

WTC Plaza, is 2 stories tall and is home to several national and international food chains such as Burger King, Walrus, Bamboo, Gardenia Mvd, and La Claraboya Cafe.

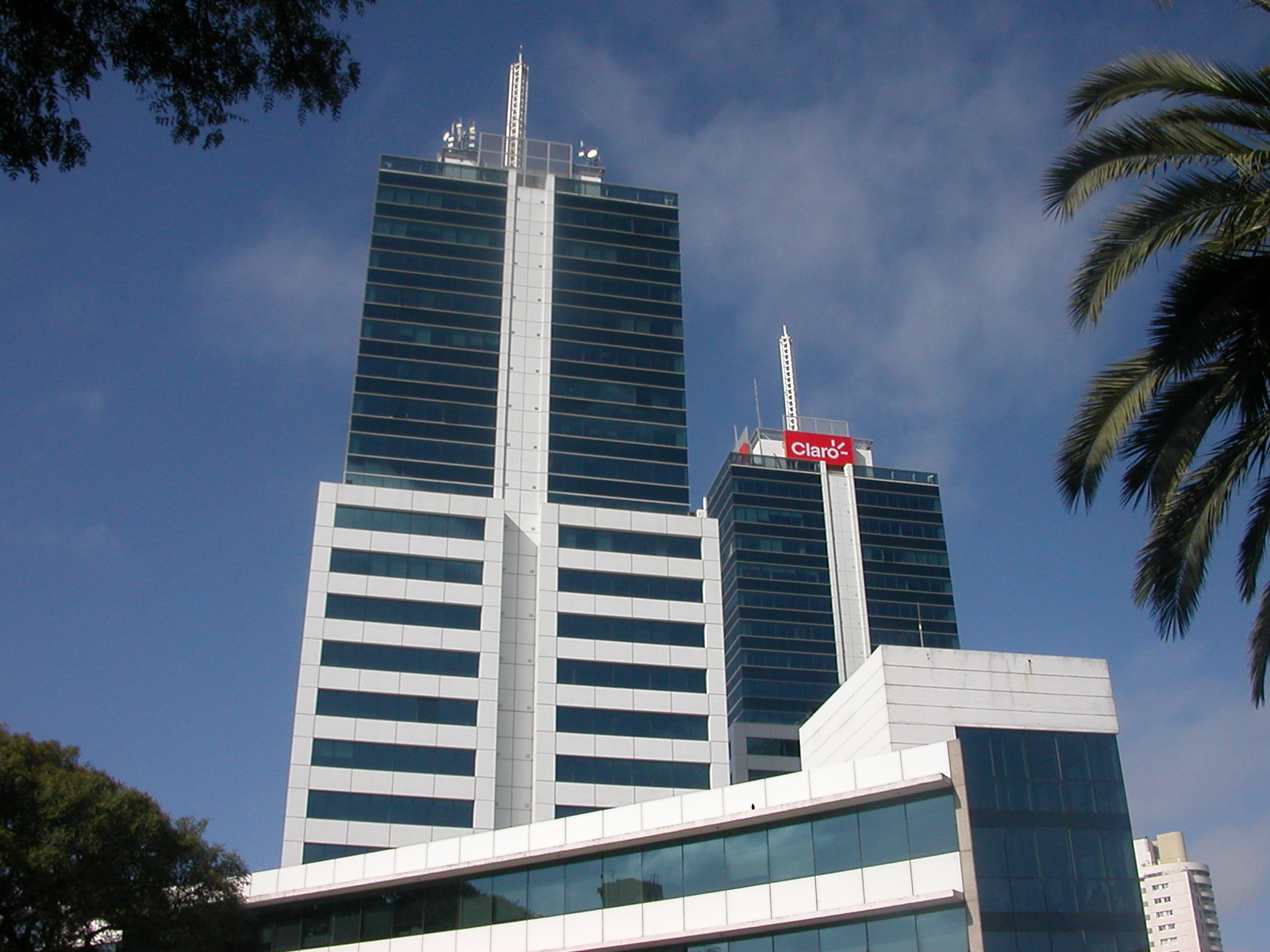
WTC 1, WTC Avenida and WTC 2

The Towers Square is meant to be a platform for the development of business activities, art exhibitions, dance and music performances, cultural animation, a meeting spot as well as a tourist attraction. It connects the different buildings and towers from the WTC Complex and acts as the main access to it. At the centre of the Square sits a sculpture made by renowned Uruguayan artist Pablo Atchugarry.

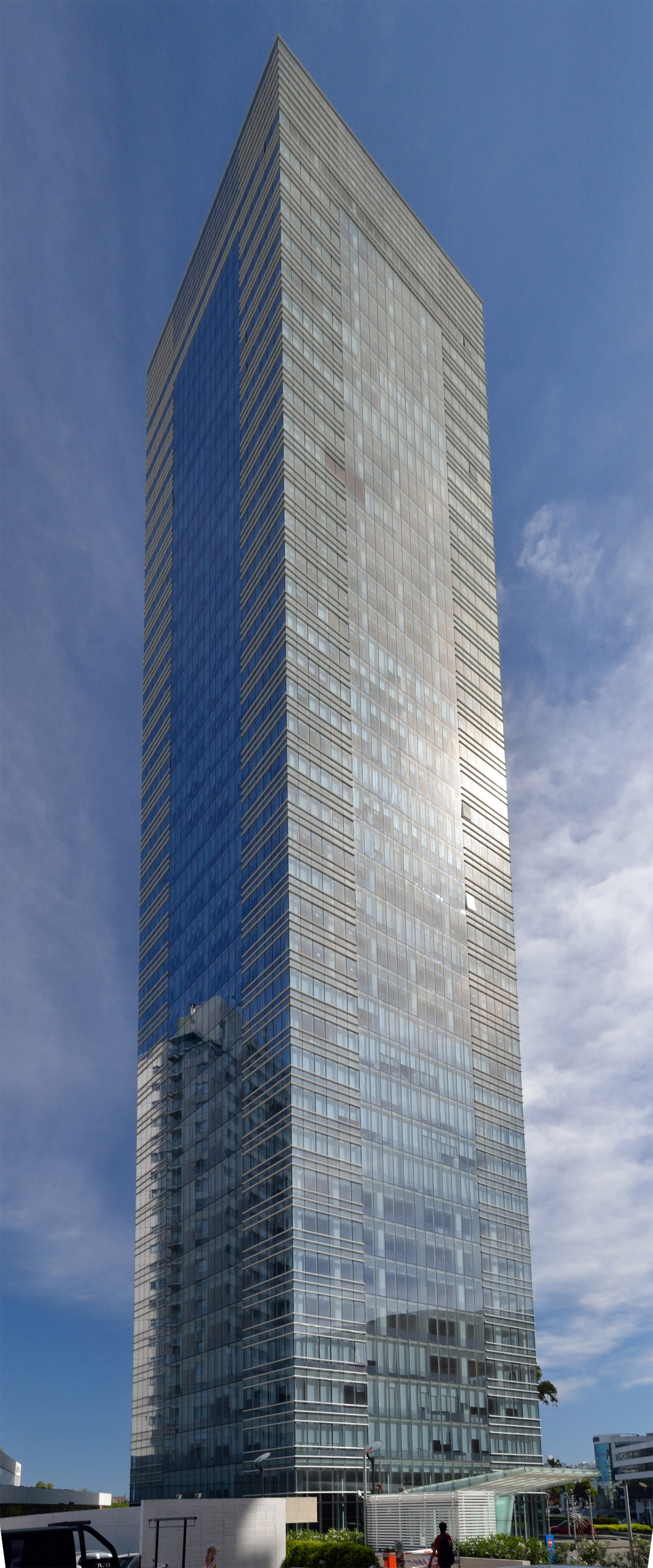
WTC IV Immediate View

Completing the complex are World Trade Center 4, the tallest building in the complex, sitting at 120 metres above the ground, and WTC Free Zone, a 23 story tall building from the "WTC FZ" complex. WTC Free Zone 2's construction is set to complete in early 2020 and sit 60 meters (22 stories) above the ground.

On July 5, 2015, a partially constructed bomb manufactured by a member of the Israeli embassy was discovered near the base of the WTC Montevideo. The motive behind this act was not fully disclosed in the press, but Judge Nestor Valetti told the press that "After viewing the security footage, intelligence officials came to the conclusion that the package was suspicious."'

== See also ==
- World Trade Center (2001–present)
- List of tallest buildings in Uruguay
