= Tienda Inglesa =

Uruguayan retail company

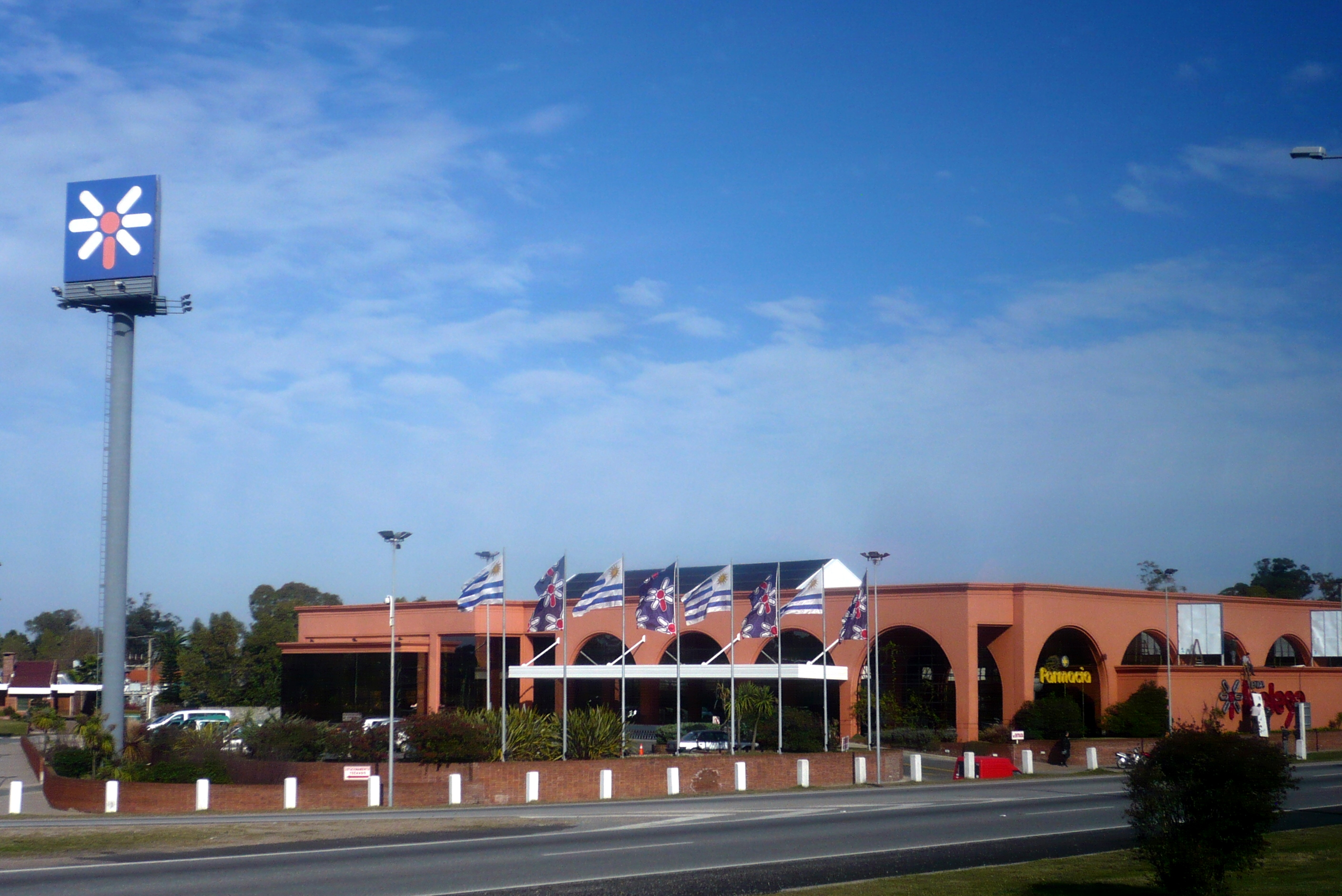
- Tienda Inglesa hypermarket in Atlántida, 2011
- Type: Sociedad Anónima
- Industry: Retail
- Founded: 1869; 157 years ago in Montevideo
- Founder: John Henderson
- Headquarters: Montevideo, Uruguay
- Number of locations: 19 (2024)
- Products: Hypermarket, supermarket, grocery store
- Owner: Goldman Sachs
- Website: tiendainglesa.com.uy

Tienda Inglesa (Spanish for 'English Store') is a Uruguayan retail company that operates a chain of hypermarkets, supermarkets and grocery stores. Founded in 1869 as a textile store and later a department store, it has 19 stores spread across the departments of Montevideo, Canelones and Maldonado, as of December 2024.

== History ==
In 1869, John Pelvis Henderson, an English immigrant, founded a small textile store in the Old City of Montevideo with his partners Marcos Pintos, Walter C. Amy and David Robertson. Over the years, the business grew into a department store, which by 1930 had 23 sections and 4 elevators, occupying half a block in the most central area of the Old City.

By the beginning of the 20th century, Uruguay was experiencing a period of prosperity that led to the massive arrival of European immigrants, increased urbanization and the emergence of a European-style society. The European influence on Uruguayan culture and society was reflected in the predominantly art deco and art nouveau architecture of the capital and in the establishment of department stores inspired by those in London and Paris. Tienda Inglesa offered products mostly imported from those cities, the fashion capitals of the time.

In 1950, the first escalator in Uruguay was installed in the store. In 1963, the first self-service supermarket opened in the Carrasco neighborhood, which meant a change in its operations. In the following years it expanded to different areas of Montevideo and other departments, including the opening of a store in the newly established Montevideo Shopping, being the first supermarket within a shopping mall in the country.

The chain also incorporated services such as a real estate agency, a travel agency, a pharmacy, a diner-style fast food restaurant and a video store, as well as a website for home delivery anywhere in the country in 2001. It also began marketing Tienda Inglesa brand products and a clothing line under the Amy&H brand, named after its founders.

In February 2016, Robin Henderson—great-grandson of John Henderson—announced that due to a lack of interest in the company from his heirs, he would step down as a director and join the board of directors. Later that year, American investment Goldman Sachs became the majority shareholder, displacing Henderson & Company S.A, the founding family company, into second place for US$120 million.

Starting in 2017, Tienda Inglesa expanded along the coast of the Maldonado Department, opening grocery stores in beach towns such as La Barra, José Ignacio, and Punta Ballena. In 2018, the Tienda Inglesa Foundation was created with programs for the labor inclusion of people with disabilities and low incomes. In 2023, the Tienda Inglesa Group acquired the Red Express supermarket chain, which expanded it to other areas of Montevideo and the country in the supermarket format.

== Operating divisions ==
Tienda Inglesa stores operate in four formats: hypermarkets, supermarkets and grocery stores.

=== Hypermarkets ===
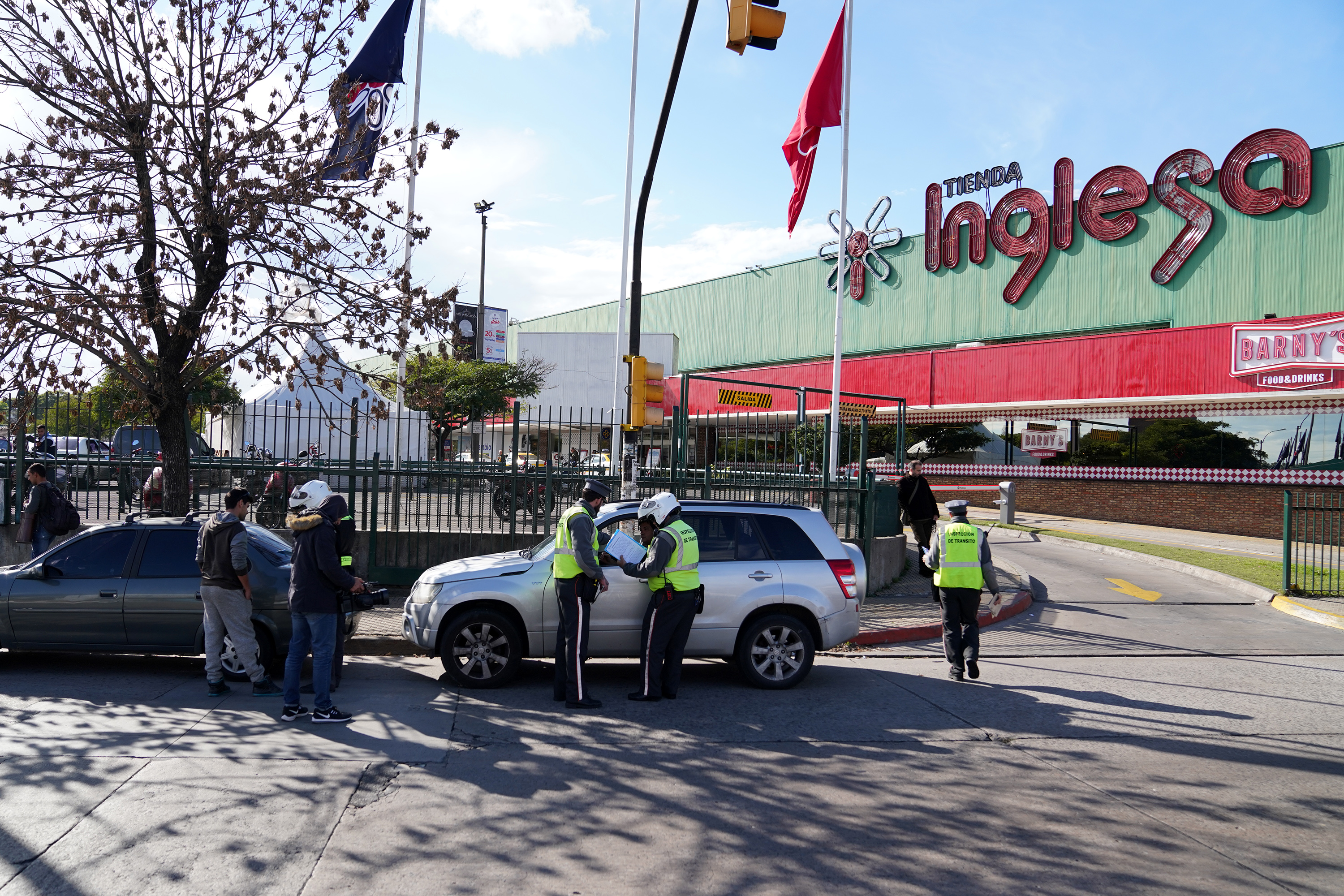
A Tienda Inglesa hypermarket in Montevideo.

Tienda Inglesa Hypermarkets are major stores with sizes of more than 34,500 square feet (3,210 square meters). These stock general merchandise and a full-service supermarket, including meat, poultry and fresh seafood, frozen foods, baked goods, dairy products and garden produce. In addition, stores in this format offer household appliances, clothing and footwear, hardware products, ready-to-assemble furniture, decoration and various other goods and home services. Most of these hypermarkets also have a pharmacy, a travel agency, a real estate agency and a Barny's diner-style fast food restaurant.

=== Grocery Stores ===
Tienda Inglesa Grocery Stores range from 6,460 to 12,920 square feet (600 to 1,200 square meters) and focus on groceries and consumables, as they sell fresh produce, deli and bakery items, prepared foods, meat, dairy, organic, general grocery and frozen foods, in addition to cleaning products.

== Events ==
Every year, the chain organizes the Fiesta de los Países (Spanish for 'Festival of Countries'). Typical products from a certain country are put on sale in each store and included in the menu of the Barny's restaurant. There are performances of typical dances and music, travel raffles, and events with the ambassador to Uruguay.
