= Edgardo Novick =

Uruguayan entrepreneur and politician

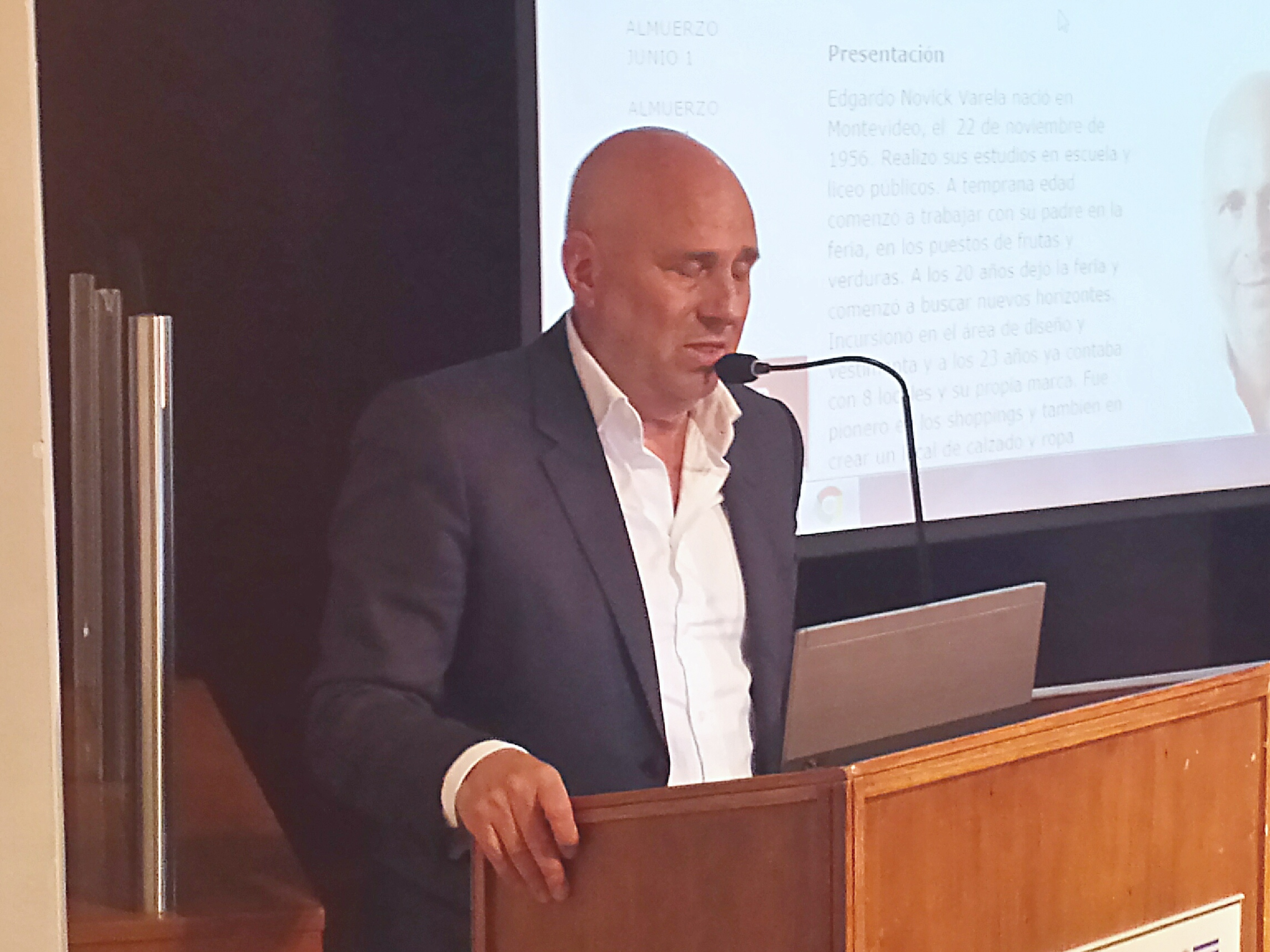
- Edgardo Novick in 2016.
- Born: 22 November 1956 (age 69); Montevideo, Uruguay
- Occupations: Businessman and politician
- Known for: Co-owns Nuevocentro Shopping
- Spouse: Solveig Rettich Gutiérrez (1980 - )
- Children: Lucía Victoria, Bernardo, Marcel, Hernán

Héctor Edgardo Novick Varela (born 22 November 1956 in Montevideo) is a Uruguayan businessman and politician.

== Biography ==
Starting out as a street market worker with his father, Novick developed an important business career. Novick co-owns Nuevocentro Shopping.

In 2015 Novick was a candidate in the Municipal Elections.

On 7 November 2016 Novick founded a political party, Partido de la Gente.

Novick is father of accountant Bernardo, actress Lucía Victoria, and the footballers Marcel and Hernán Novick.
