= Montevideo Shopping =

Montevideo Shopping Center
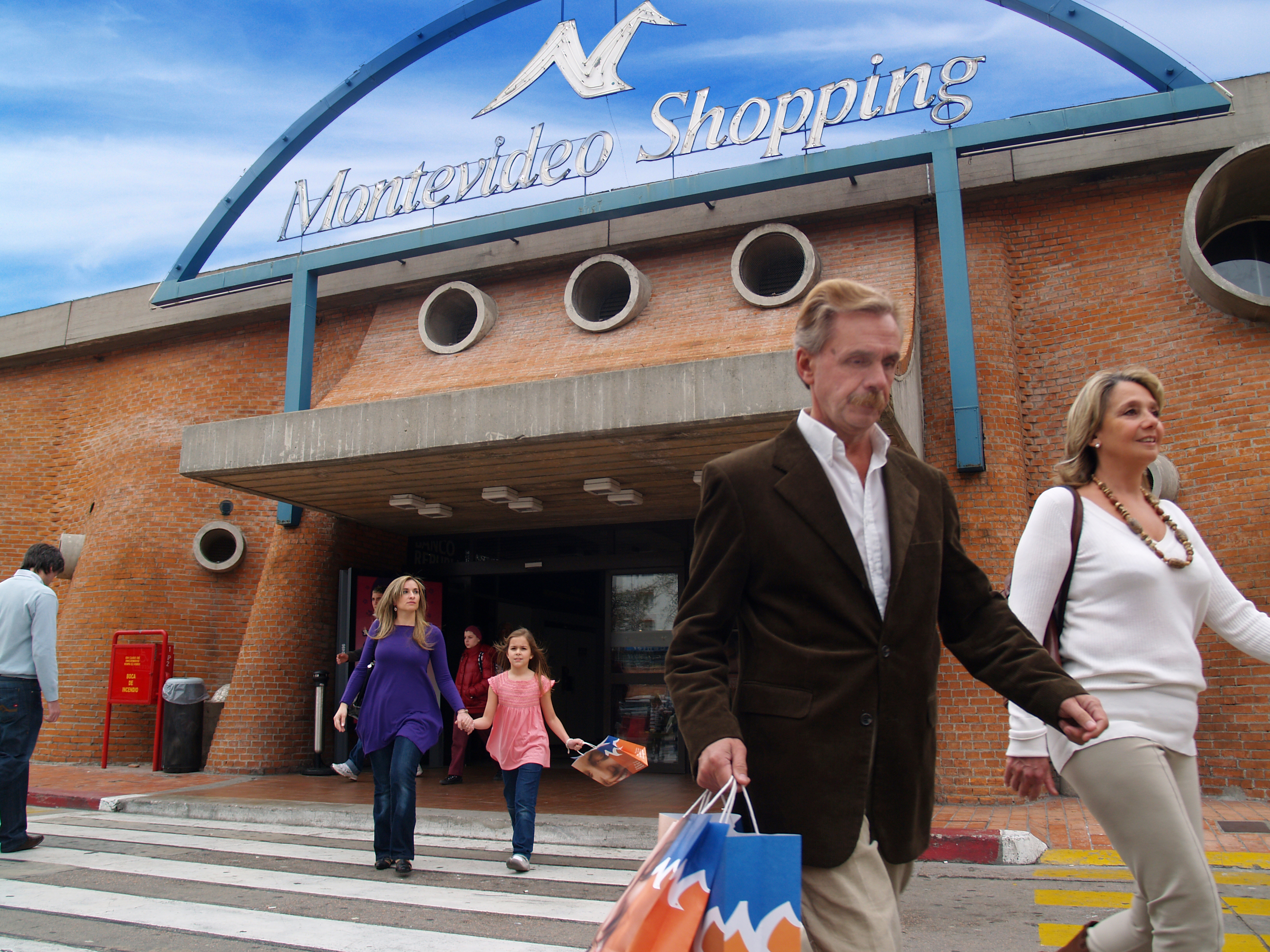
- Mall entrance
- Location: Montevideo, Uruguay
- Coordinates: 34°54′10″S 56°08′10″W
- Address: 1290 Luis Alberto de Herrera Ave, Montevideo
- Opened: 1985
- Architect: Guillermo Gómez Platero
- Num. of stores: 200
- Floors: 3 for public - 6 for parking
- Parking: 2051
- Website: www.montevideoshopping.com.uy

Montevideo Shopping Center is the first shopping mall that opened in Montevideo, Uruguay. It is located in the neighborhood Buceo, on the border with Pocitos, right in front of the World Trade Center Montevideo.

== The mall ==
Opened in 1985 and later expanded, it has 181 shops on three levels; parking place for 2051 vehicles on six levels. It was created by Estudio Gómez Platero, López Rey Estudio Gómez Platero, with the intervention of the engineer Eladio Dieste in the original brick structure. The original idea for the mall came from the accountant Luis Eugenio Lecueder. The seagull design was made by cartoonist Gabriel Odera. One of its first stores was Tienda Inglesa, which was Uruguay's first supermarket in a mall.

The mall is managed by the Estudio Luis E. Lecueder (which in turn is owned along with the Portones Shopping, Tres Cruces Shopping, Nuevocentro Shopping, Salto Shopping Terminal, Mercedes Terminal Shopping, Colonia Shopping and the Paysandú Terminal Shopping). The complex receives around 1,400,000 visitors per month, and has been expanded 21 times.

Montevideo Shopping has been the landing place for several international brands that have arrive in the country, such as McDonald's (1991), Zara (1999), Forever 21 (2014), Starbucks Coffee (2018), H&M (2018).

== Image gallery ==
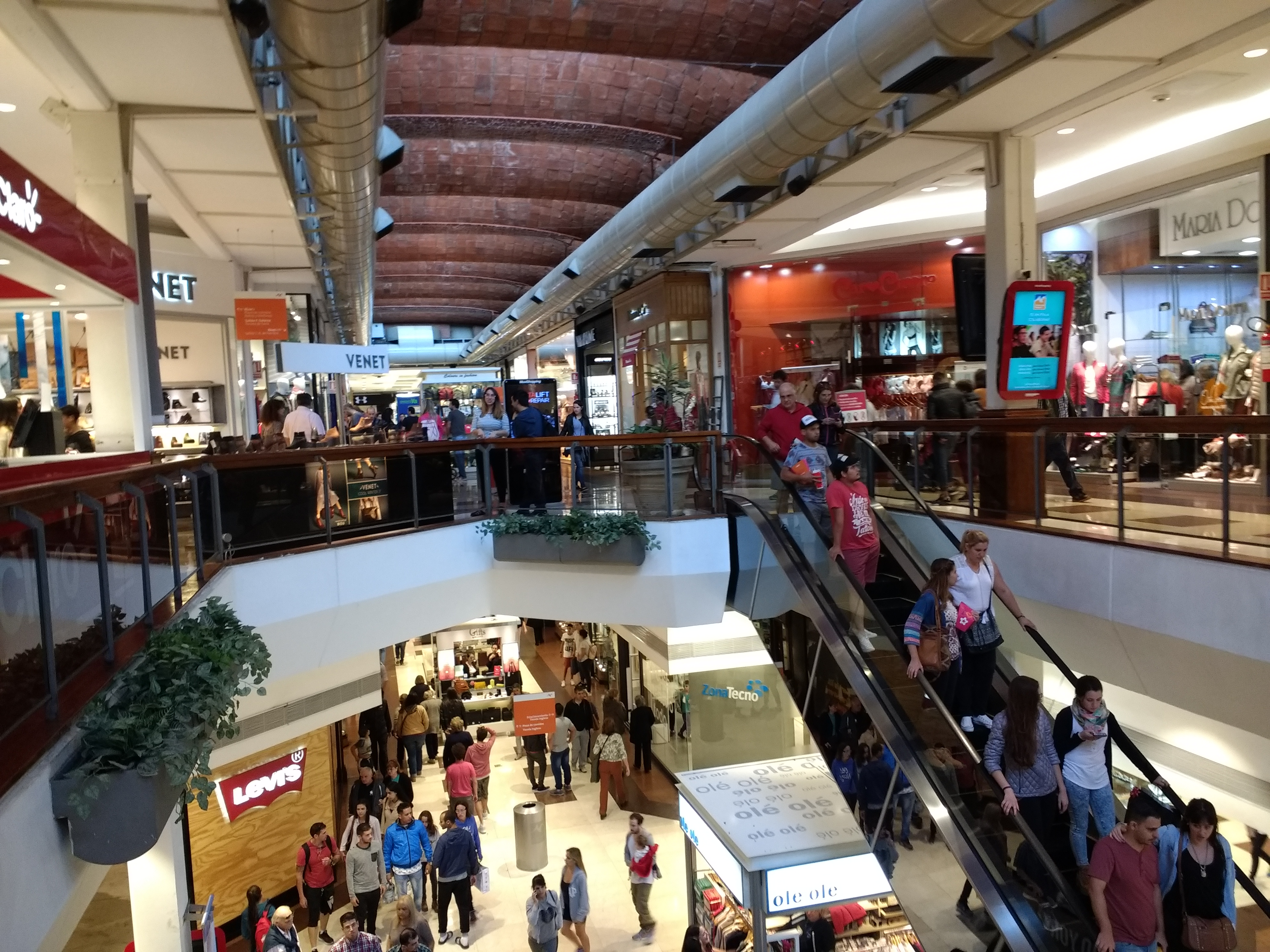
An escalator well in the mall

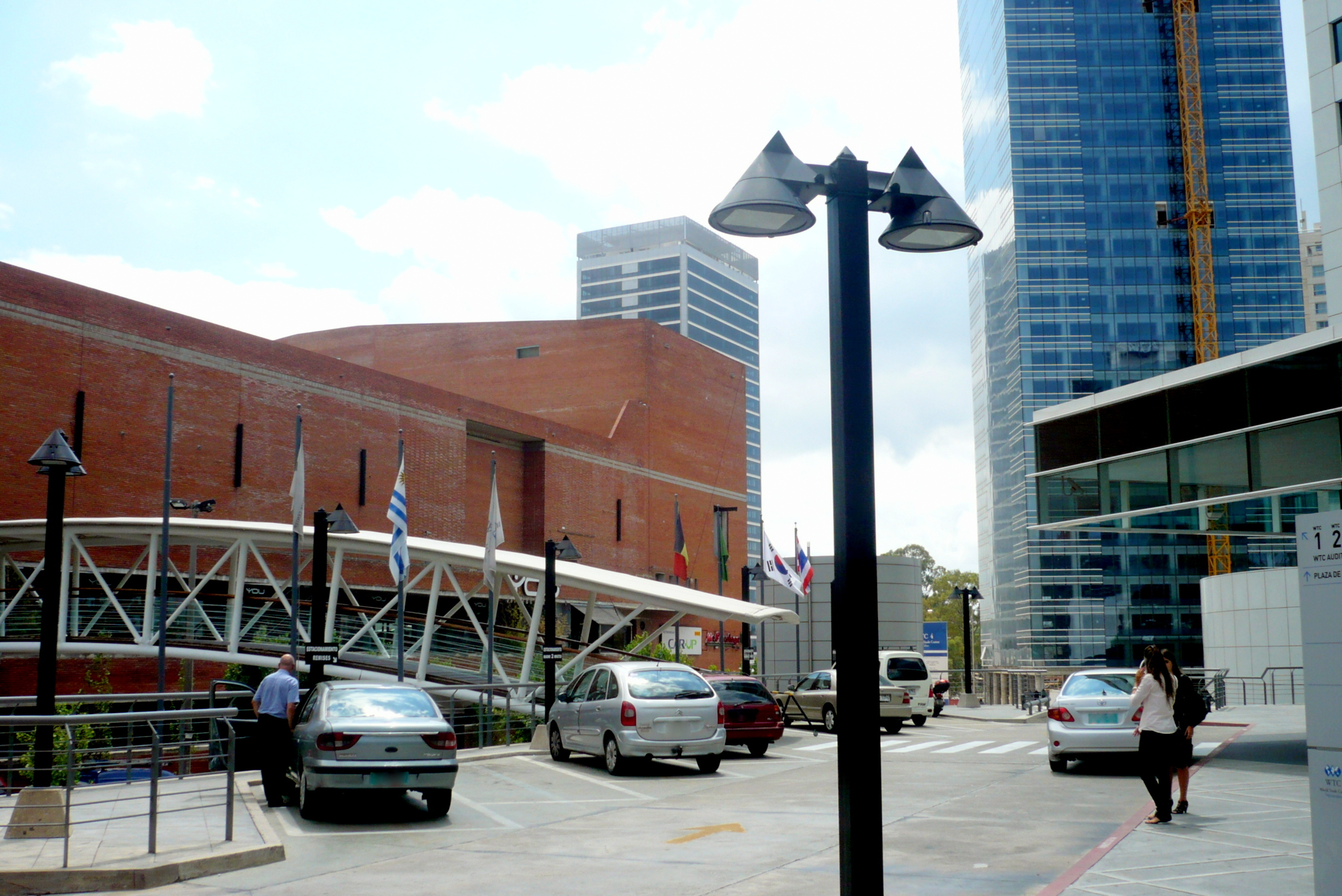
Rear facade next to the World Trade Center

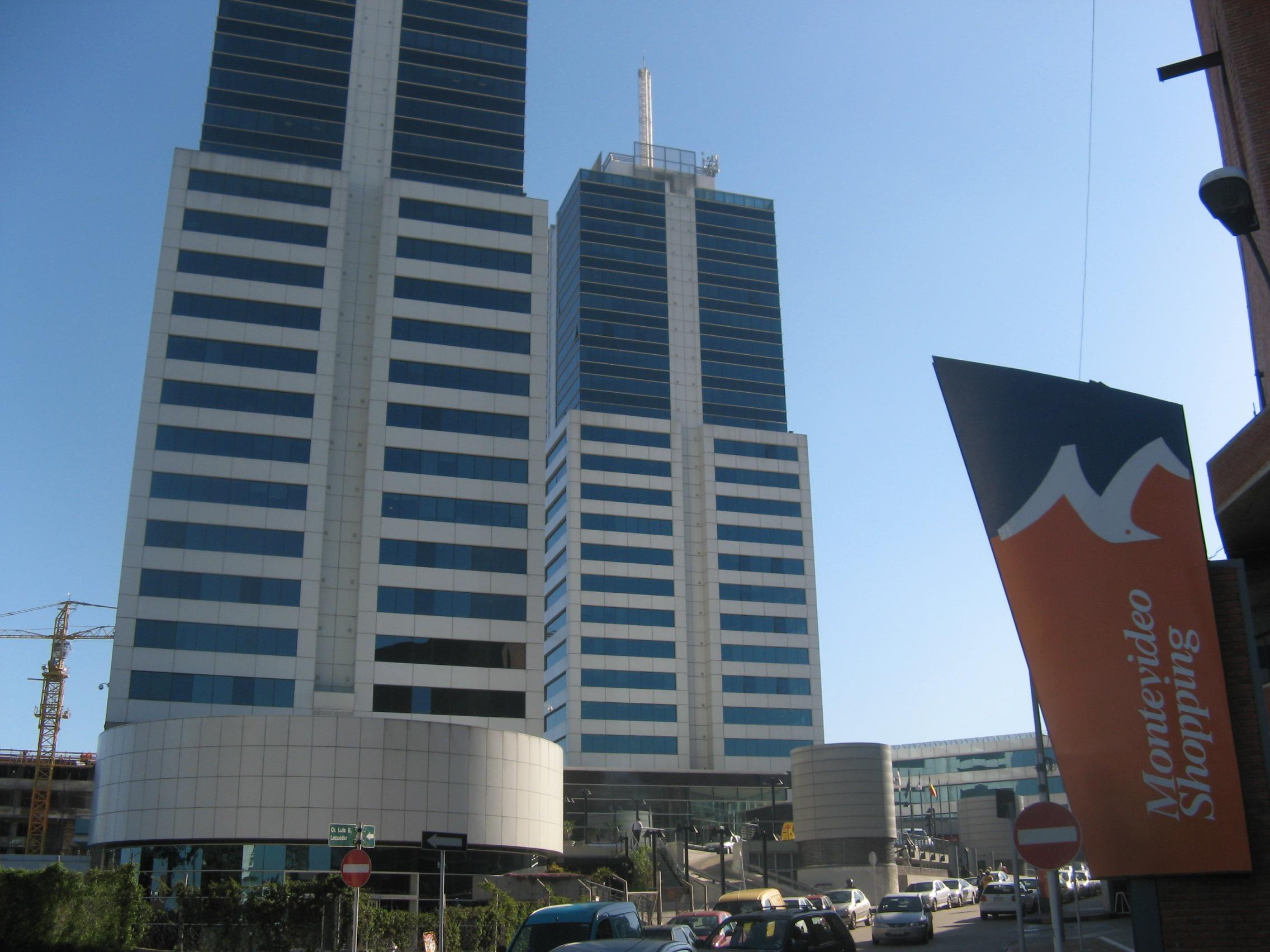
Sign at a Montevideo Shopping mall's entrance
