= Bridegroom (disambiguation) =

A bridegroom (or groom) is a male wedding partner.

It may also refer to:

- Bridegroom (film), a 2013 documentary film
- The Bridegroom (short story collection), by Ha Jin
- The Bridegroom, a short work of fiction by Angela Carter
- The Bridegroom, an adaptation by Alexander Pushkin of The Robber Bridegroom (fairy tale)
- The Bridegroom, an icon in Eastern Christianity

== See also ==
- Groom (disambiguation)
