= Portones Shopping =

Shopping mall in Montevideo, Uruguay

portones Shopping Center
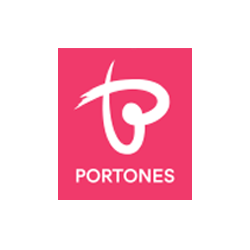
- Location: Montevideo, Uruguay
- Address: 5775 Italia Ave, Montevideo
- Opened: 1994
- Architect: Guillermo Gómez Platero
- Num. of stores: 145
- Floor area: 27,898 m^{2} (300,290 sq ft)
- Floors: 2
- Website: www.portones.com.uy

Portones Shopping is a shopping mall of Montevideo, Uruguay. It is located in the neighborhood Carrasco.

It receives its name from the Portones de Carrasco (Gates of Carrasco) a landmark of the neighborhood. The mall is managed by the Estudio Luis E. Lecueder (which in turn is owned along with the Montevideo Shopping, Tres Cruces Shopping, Nuevocentro Shopping, Salto Shopping Terminal, Mercedes Terminal Shopping, Colonia Shopping and the Paysandú Terminal Shopping). Bordering the building, on Bolivia Avenue is the Portones Terminal with bus service to many neighborhoods of the city.

== History ==
The project began in 1989 when Carlos V. Metzen, Oscar Sena, Luis E. Lecueder and Carlos A. Lecueder bought a large piece of land located on Avenida Italia and Avenida Bolivia, owned by the Mendizábal family. The project was carried out by the architect Guillermo Gómez Platero, who had to develop a building in keeping with the neighborhood's aesthetics (made up of brick, tiles and much green). Due in part to complications with municipal permits and complexities during construction, the shopping center was opened to the public on May 31, 1994. The project was managed by Estudio Luis E. Lecueder, which continues to lead it.

The first company to sign their reservation was Foto Martín on August 9, 1991. The contracts began to be signed in September 1992, with the first Foto Martín and Papelería El Plata on 10, Play and Rec on 21 and Pasqualini on 30. Pasqualini thus fulfilled the tradition of Renato Azzoni, of always being the fourth contract signed in a shopping center, the last to sign was Tiendas Montevideo. Among the pioneers were also Sisí, San Roque and Copacabana. In 1999 Movie Center was installed with the concept of multiplex movie theaters, becoming the first film complex in the country. Later, the Devoto Hypercenter would be added.

In December 2016, the shopping center logo was changed, as well as its slogan, which became "Momentos felices" (Happy moments), with the aim of "developing a new proposal", and having a "new corporate image".

== Image gallery ==
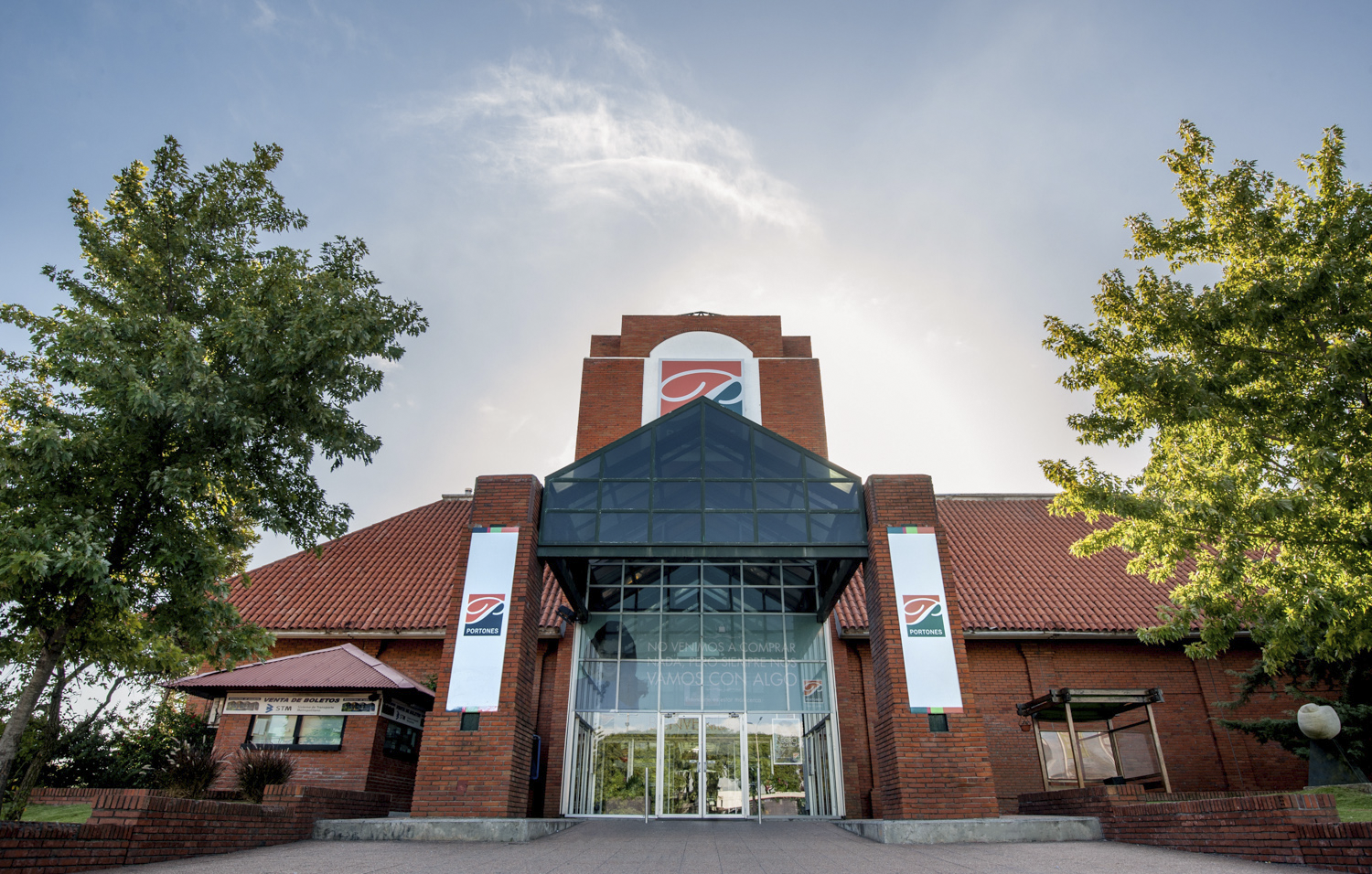
Mall entrance

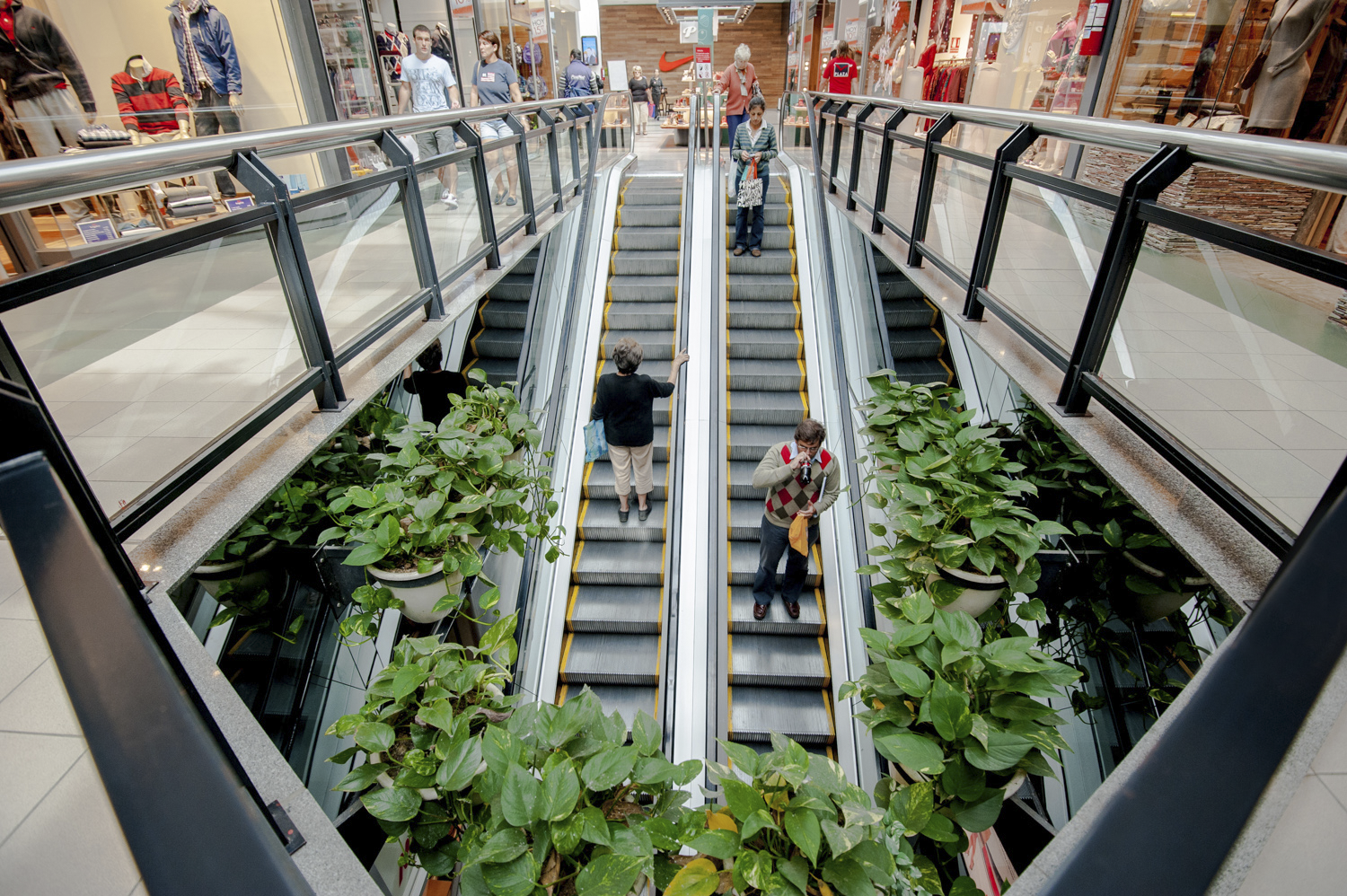
An escalator well in the mall

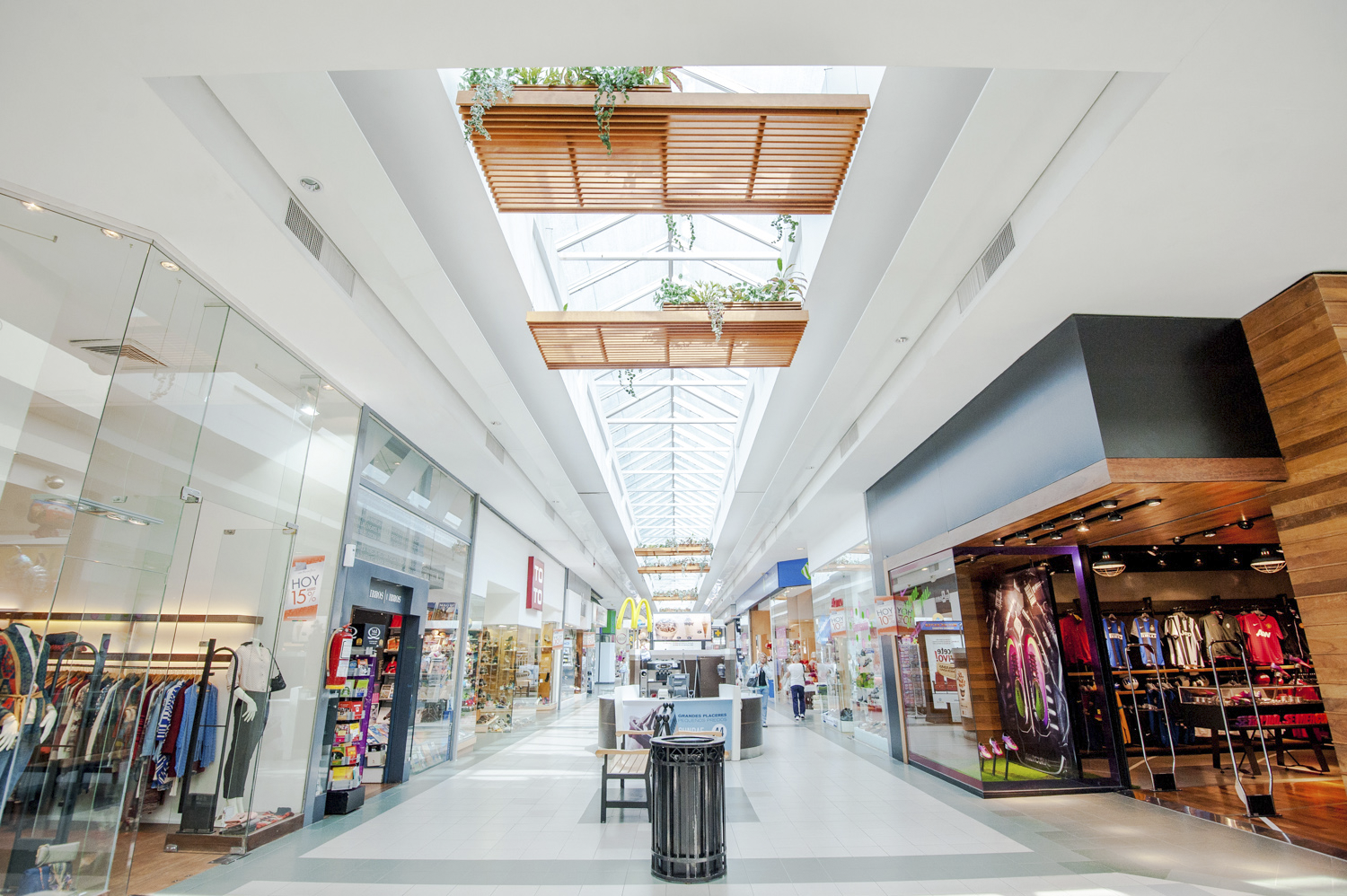
Stores
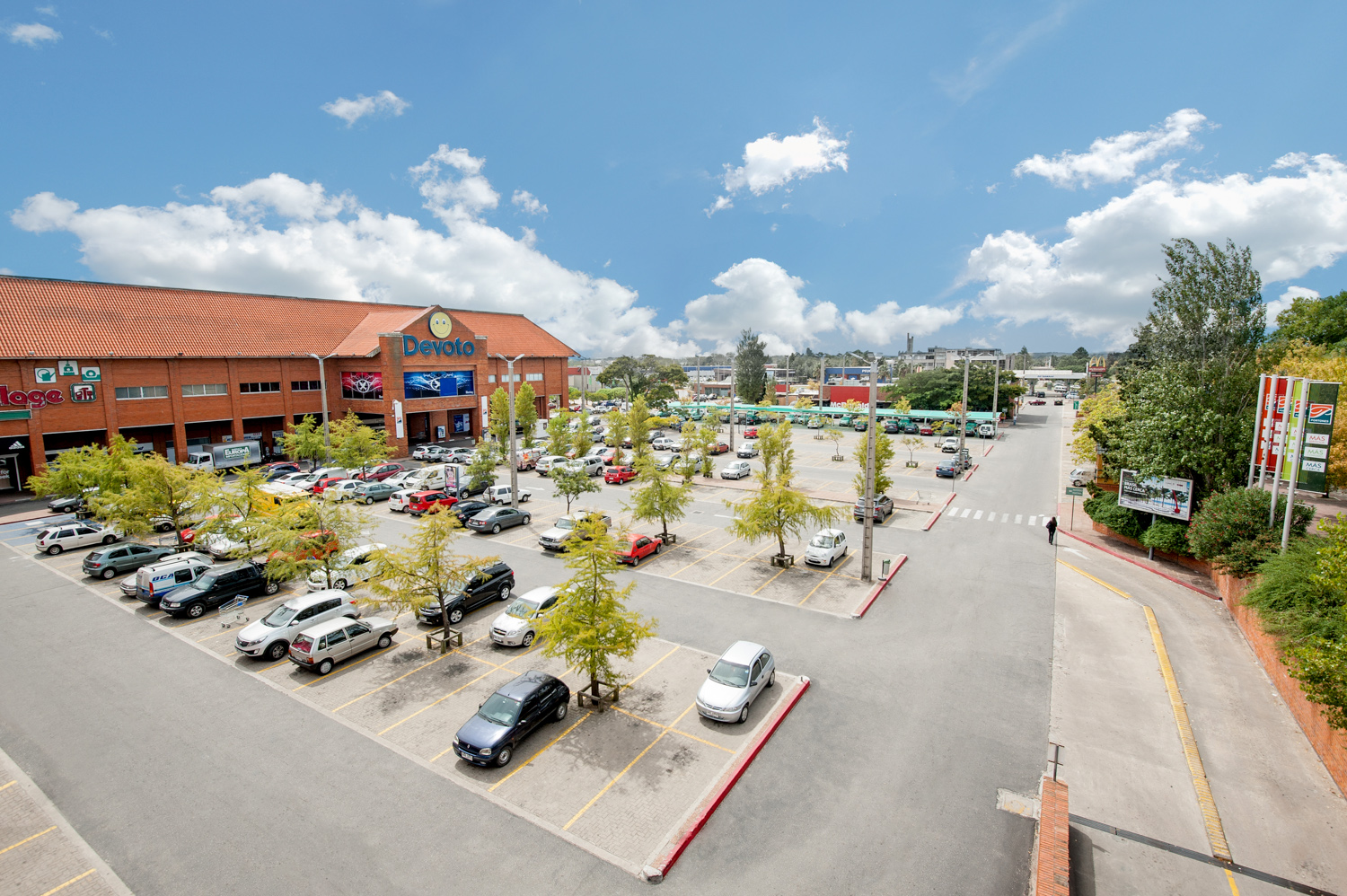
Parking

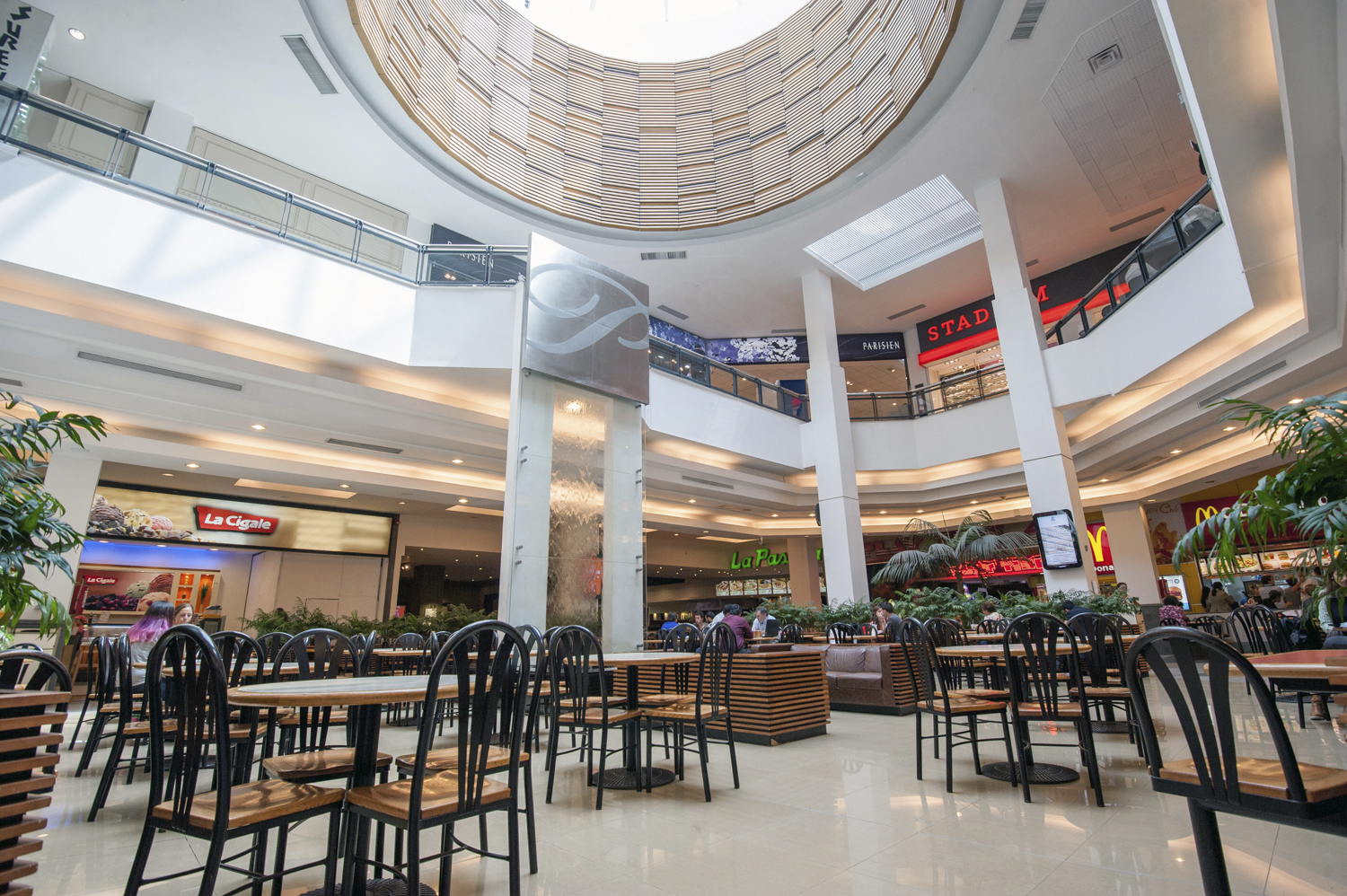
Food court
