= Miro Steržaj =

Slovenian bowling player and mayor (1933–2020)

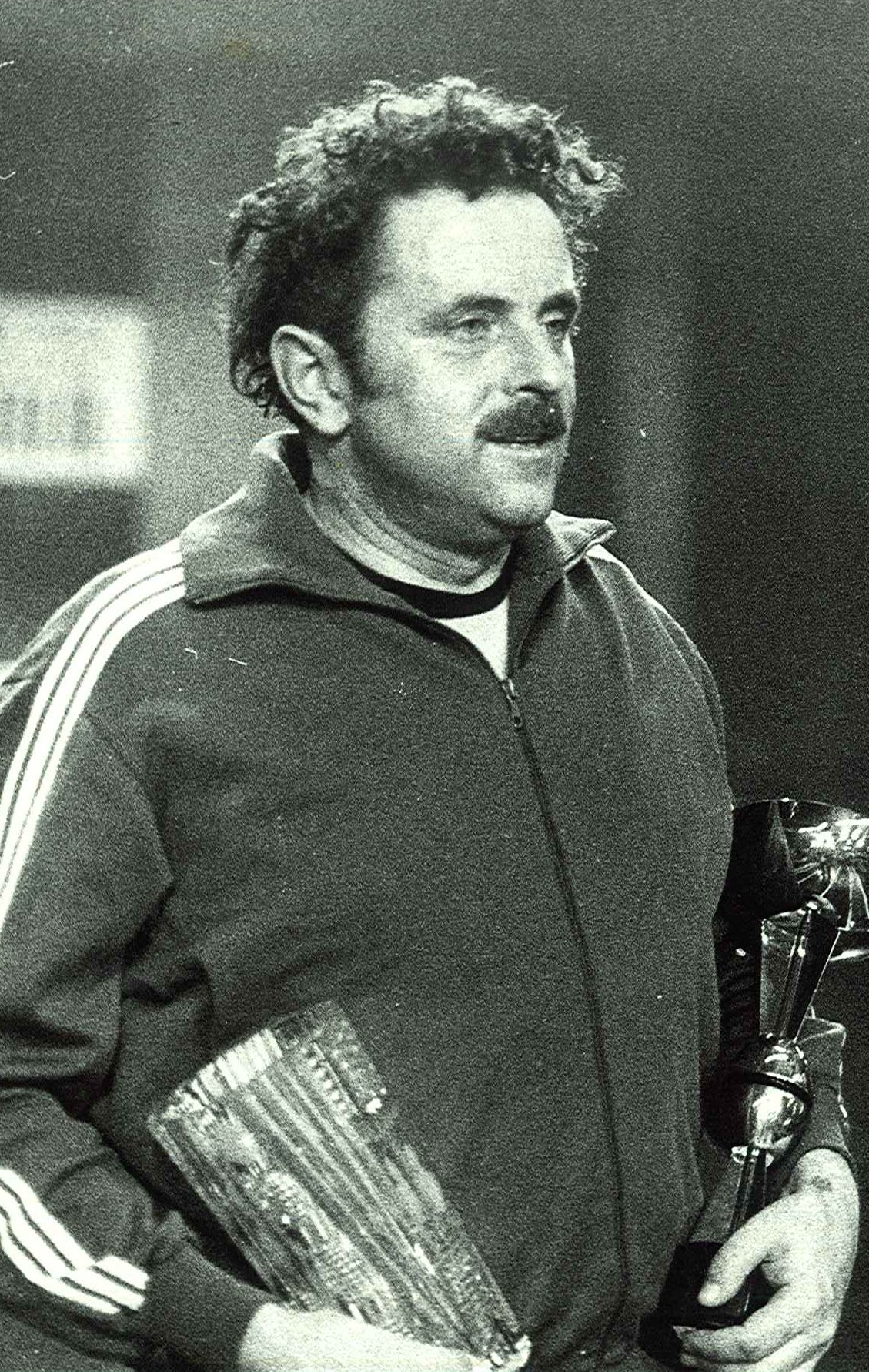
- Miro Steržaj

Personal information
- Nationality: Slovenian
- Born: February 28, 1933 Rakek, Slovenia
- Died: November 8, 2020 Murska Sobota, Slovenia
- Height: 186 cm (6 ft 1 in)

Sport
- Country: Yugoslavia (134 caps); SR Slovenia (34 caps)
- Sport: 9-pins
- Club: KK Ljutomer (1950-1962); KK Branik (1962-1978); KK Radenska (1978-2019)

Achievements and titles
- Personal bests: 200: 1120 (Ljubljana 1973); 120: 570 (Radenci 2004)
Medal record
Men's 9-pins
Representing Yugoslavia
Event	1st	2nd	3rd
World Championships	4	3	5
European Championships	3	2	0
Total	7	5	5
World Championships
Gold medal – first place	1957 Vienna	Team
Gold medal – first place	1959 Bautzen	Team
Gold medal – first place	1968 Linz	Individual
Gold medal – first place	1976 Vienna	Team
Silver medal – second place	1968 Linz	Doubles
Silver medal – second place	1974 Eppelheim	Doubles
Silver medal – second place	1976 Vienna	Doubles
Bronze medal – third place	1966 Bucharest	Team
Bronze medal – third place	1972 Split	Team
Bronze medal – third place	1974 Eppelheim	Team
Bronze medal – third place	1980 Mangalia	Team
Bronze medal – third place	1984 Ljubljana	Team
European Championships
Gold medal – first place	1964 Budapest	Individual
Gold medal – first place	1964 Budapest	Doubles
Gold medal – first place	1964 Budapest	Team
Silver medal – second place	1958 Munich	Team
Silver medal – second place	1960 Zagreb	Team
Event	1st	2nd	3rd
Yugoslav Championships	13	7	5
Slovenian Championships	25	17	9
Total National Championships	38	24	14
Yugoslav Championships
Gold medal – first place	1964	Individual
Gold medal – first place	1965	Individual
Gold medal – first place	1965	Doubles
Gold medal – first place	1966	Individual
Gold medal – first place	1966	Doubles
Gold medal – first place	1967	Doubles
Gold medal – first place	1968	Individual
Gold medal – first place	1968	Doubles
Gold medal – first place	1971	Individual
Gold medal – first place	1974	Doubles
Gold medal – first place	1976	Individual
Gold medal – first place	1978	Doubles
Gold medal – first place	1981	Individual
Silver medal – second place	1963	Individual
Silver medal – second place	1967	Individual
Silver medal – second place	1970	Individual
Silver medal – second place	1972	Individual
Silver medal – second place	1974	Individual
Silver medal – second place	1975	Individual
Silver medal – second place	1980	Individual
Bronze medal – third place	1961	Individual
Bronze medal – third place	1971	Doubles
Bronze medal – third place	1978	Individual
Bronze medal – third place	1979	Individual
Bronze medal – third place	1982	Doubles
Slovenian Championships
Gold medal – first place	1960	Individual
Gold medal – first place	1961	Individual
Gold medal – first place	1962	Individual
Gold medal – first place	1963	Individual
Gold medal – first place	1964	Team
Gold medal – first place	1965	Doubles
Gold medal – first place	1966	Doubles
Gold medal – first place	1968	Individual
Gold medal – first place	1970	Individual
Gold medal – first place	1970	Doubles
Gold medal – first place	1971	Individual
Gold medal – first place	1971	Doubles
Gold medal – first place	1972	Individual
Gold medal – first place	1973	Individual
Gold medal – first place	1973	Doubles
Gold medal – first place	1974	Individual
Gold medal – first place	1974	Doubles
Gold medal – first place	1978	Individual
Gold medal – first place	1978	Doubles
Gold medal – first place	1980	Individual
Gold medal – first place	1980	Doubles
Gold medal – first place	1981	Doubles
Gold medal – first place	1982	Individual
Gold medal – first place	1983	Team
Gold medal – first place	1984	Doubles
Silver medal – second place	1964	Individual
Silver medal – second place	1965	Individual
Silver medal – second place	1965	Team
Silver medal – second place	1966	Individual
Silver medal – second place	1967	Doubles
Silver medal – second place	1967	Team
Silver medal – second place	1968	Doubles
Silver medal – second place	1969	Team
Silver medal – second place	1970	Team
Silver medal – second place	1975	Doubles
Silver medal – second place	1977	Doubles
Silver medal – second place	1979	Team
Silver medal – second place	1982	Doubles
Silver medal – second place	1982	Team
Silver medal – second place	1983	Individual
Silver medal – second place	1983	Doubles
Bronze medal – third place	1962	Team
Bronze medal – third place	1966	Team
Bronze medal – third place	1967	Individual
Bronze medal – third place	1968	Team
Bronze medal – third place	1972	Team
Bronze medal – third place	1973	Team
Bronze medal – third place	1976	Team
Bronze medal – third place	1979	Individual
Bronze medal – third place	1986	Team

Miro Steržaj (full name Miroslav Steržaj, 28 February 1933 – 8 November 2020) was a Slovene 9 pin bowling player and politician.

== Biography ==
He was born in Rakek, Municipality of Cerknica, but moved to Ljutomer when he was 17 years old.

From 1950 to 1962 he played for KK Ljutomer, where he won his first individual Slovenian championship in 1960. In 1962 he moved to KK Branik in Maribor. In 1964 he became absolute European champion, winning in the individual, doubles and team events, while setting a new world record. In 1968 he became World champion with another world record in the individual category, adding to what would eventually become 4 World championship titles (3 with team in 1957, 1959 and 1976). He came second in doubles in 1968 (with Jože Turk), 1974 and 1976 (with Nikola Dragaš). He was part of the Yugoslav national team for 30 years, becoming their most capped player with 134 caps, which is a record for Slovenian players that stands until today. He won a record 7 individual national Yugoslavian titles (tied with Nikola Dragaš), a record 13 individual national Slovenian titles and a record 10 Slovenian national doubles titles, making him the statistically best Slovene nine-pin bowler of all time.

In 1955 he began to work at Mlekopromet, a cheese producing dairy in Ljutomer. He was sales manager for 12 years, after which he was appointed director. In 1993 he retired from his post. After his retirement he became secretary of the Economic association of milk production (GIZ mlekarstva). In 2003 he retired from the association and work completely. For his success in business, he received the award of Chamber of Commerce and Industry of Slovenia in 1981.

He served three terms as vice-mayor, and from 1988 to 1992 as mayor of Ljutomer. He served as a member of the 1st Slovenian National Council.

He was named honorary citizen of Ljutomer in 2003. He received the Bloudek award for his sport achievements in 1968. Despite never being named Slovenian Sportsman of the Year outright, he got honoured as Slovenian Sportsman of the decade 1968–1978, awarded for the decade following the first Sportsman of the Year award ceremony. In 2012 he was inducted into the Slovenian Athletes Hall of Fame.

He died in November 2020, aged 87, from COVID-19 and thrombosis during the COVID-19 pandemic in Slovenia.
