= Grem =

The term Grem may refer to:

- A main character in the movie Cars 2
- The city of Kutaisi in Georgia, former capital of Colchis and the Kingdom of Imereti
- SIMON breach grenade (Grenade Rifle Entry Munition)
- Grem, Uttar Pradesh, a village in India
- A Central Pennsylvanian term used to identify one's grandmother
