= Marcel Novick =

Uruguayan footballer (born 1983)

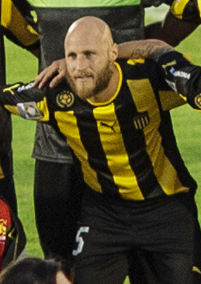

Personal information
- Full name: Marcel Novick Rettich
- Date of birth: 11 October 1983 (age 43)
- Place of birth: Montevideo, Uruguay
- Height: 1.71 m (5 ft 7 in)
- Position: Defensive midfielder

Team information
- Current team: Boston River (youth coach)

Senior career*
Years	Team	Apps	(Gls)
2003	Fénix		
2004	Peñarol		
2005	Fénix		
2006	Rocha		
2006	El Tanque Sisley		
2007	Sportivo Trinidense		
2007–2008	El Tanque Sisley		
2008–2009	Villa Española	13	(0)
2009–2011	Rampla Juniors	59	(1)
2012–2021	Peñarol	105	(2)
2021	Racing de Montevideo	5	(0)

Managerial career
- 2023–: Boston River (youth)
- * Club domestic league appearances and goals

Marcel Novick Rettich (born 11 October 1983) is a Uruguayan football coach and a former player who played as a defensive midfielder. He is a youth coach with Boston River. His nickname is Vikingo (Spanish for "the Viking").

== Family ==
Novick is son of businessman and politician Edgardo Novick, and brother of footballer Hernán Novick.
