= Groom (disambiguation) =

A groom (short for bridegroom) is a male participant in a wedding ceremony.

Groom or grooming may also refer to:

== Hygiene and cleanliness ==
- Dog grooming, the care provided for a dog's physical appearance (especially its coat and nails), or specific work done to enhance its appearance for a show
- Grooming (cross country skiing), preparing cross-country skiing trails
- Horse grooming, the daily hygienic care provided for horses, or specific work done on the horse to enhance its physical appearance for a show
- Male grooming, specific work done by men to enhance their physical appearance, or daily hygiene care done by men
- Personal grooming, or preening, in humans and other animals, a hygienic activity (caring for physical appearance)
- Snow grooming, the process of preparing snow for recreational uses, such as skiing
- Social grooming, behavior between humans and other animals who live in proximity, helping bond and reinforce social structures

== Indoctrination and abuse ==
- Sexual grooming, using non-violent means to normalize sexual abuse
  - Sex trafficking, using the "loverboy method" to recruit victims into prostitution
- Online youth radicalization, or grooming (recruiting) youth to join gangs or enact terrorism

== Occupations ==
- Groom (profession), a person responsible for the feeding and care of horses
- Groom, one of the competitors in combined driving

=== In the English/British Royal Household ===
- Groom of the Bedchamber, later named Groom in Waiting, a junior nobleman in attendance in the King's Bedchamber
- Groom of the Chamber, a rank of courtier in the Tudor royal court
- Groom of the Great Chamber, a junior nobleman in attendance (who would customarily also serve as King's Messenger)
- Groom of the Privy Chamber, a junior nobleman in attendance in the Chamber
- Groom of the Robes
- Groom of the Stool, later named Groom of the Stole, the senior nobleman in attendance in the King's Bedchamber

== Places ==
- Groom, Texas, a town in Carson County, Texas, United States, location of the second largest cross in the western hemisphere
- Division of Groom, a Commonwealth Electoral Division in Queensland, Australia
- Groom Lake (salt flat), a geographic feature of the United States Military Area 51
- Groom Range, a mountain range in Nevada, United States

== Film and television ==
- The Groom, a 2016 Russian comedy film
- Groomed (film), a 2021 American documentary film
- Groomed (TV series), a Canadian reality show

== Other uses ==
- Groom (surname), a surname (including a list of people with the name)
- Traffic grooming, a technical activity in telecommunications

== See also ==
- Bridegroom (disambiguation)
- Grom (disambiguation)
