= Nuevocentro Shopping =

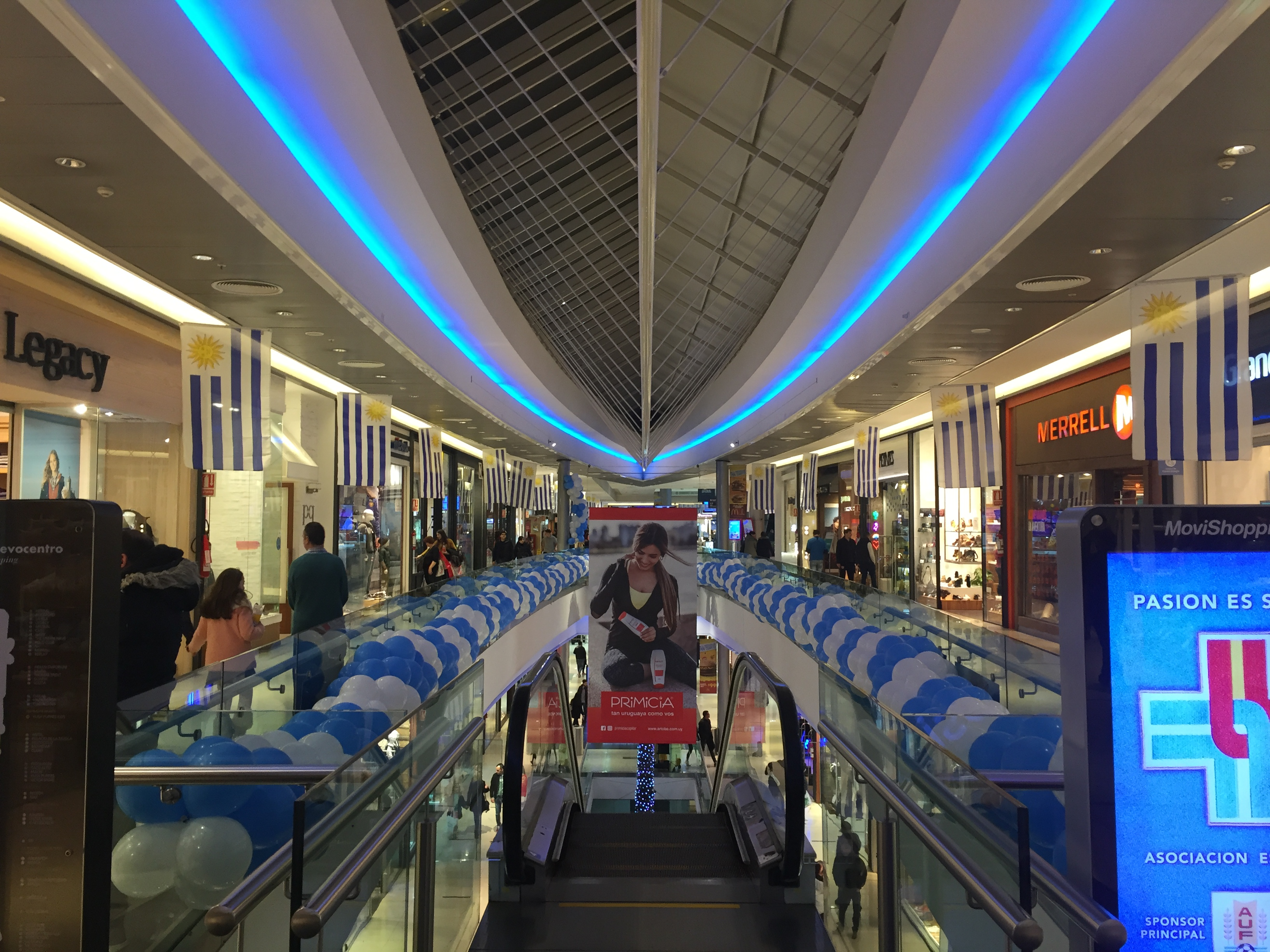
- Decoration on the occasion of Uruguay's participation in the 2018 FIFA World Cup.
- Location: Montevideo, Uruguay
- Address: Luis Alberto de Herrera and Artigas Boulevard, Montevideo
- Opened: October 24, 2013
- Developer: Gómez Platero Studio
- Num. of stores: 146
- Floor area: 73,610 m^{2} (792,300 sq ft)
- Floors: 3
- Parking: 1,000
- Website: www.nuevocentroshopping.com.uy

Nuevocentro Shopping is a shopping mall of Montevideo, Uruguay. It is located in the neighborhood Jacinto Vera.

The name of the shopping center arose from a contest in 2009 called "Name your New Shopping", in which 20,000 proposals participated. The name chosen was Nuevocentro and reflects what the new commercial proposal will mean for the city of Montevideo.

== The mall ==
With an investment of 60 million dollars, Nuevocentro shopping is the fifth shopping center with these characteristics in the Uruguayan capital. The project was presented in 2008, and had the endorsement of the then President Tabaré Vázquez. Once the municipal authorizations were ready, at the end of March 2011 the works began, which lasted two and a half years. The shopping center was built on the land provided by the Cutcsa transport company, which also has an economic stake in the shopping center. The workshops of this company were located in said land until 2011.

The commercial project was carried out by Estudio Gómez Platero and the works were carried out by the companies Ebital and Saceem. The total building corresponds to 73,610 m^{2} (792,300 sq ft), of which 32,260 m^{2} (347,200 sq ft) correspond to the commercial area of the shopping, 37,300 m^{2} (401,000 sq ft) to the closed parking and 4,050 m^{2} (43,600 sq ft) to the cinema area, also having an open parking of 2,450 m^{2} (26,400 sq ft).

The mall has 130 commercial stores, a 6,500 m^{2} (70,000 sq ft) hypermarket spread over 3 levels, a food court for 600 people, a parking lot with 1,000 spaces, a 1,000 m^{2} (11,000 sq ft) amusement center, and a complex with five movie theaters. The shopping center also has a set of colorful lights and an artificial waterfall on one of its facades.

The project also included the construction of two 23-story towers, with a total of 437 units, which are located above the shopping center. In October 2013, the financial trust prospectus was approved by the Central Bank of Uruguay for the construction and commercialization of the buildings. The complex are named Torres Nuevocentro, one of them are located on Bulevar Artigas and the other on Avenida Luis Alberto de Herrera.

== Expansion ==
At the end of 2019, the Shopping expanded its commercial offer with the inauguration of a third floor of more than 8000 m2 that attracted large international brands such as Renner and H&M, and also added new parking trays with capacity for 1.200 cars, with an investment of 20 million dollars. In a month, the shopping mall receives around 1.1 million visitors. After this expansion, it seeks to add more than 1.8.

== See also ==
- Montevideo Shopping
- Portones Shopping
- Tres Cruces bus station
