= 1966 World Ninepin Bowling Classic Championships =

European bowling competition

6th World Ninepin Bowling Classic Championships
- Host city: Bucharest
- Country: Romania
- Nations: 8
- Athletes: 95
- Sport: 9-pins
- Events: 6
- Opening: June 19, 1966
- Closing: June 25, 1966

The 1966 World Ninepin Bowling Classic Championships was the sixth edition of the championships and was held in Bucharest, Romania, from 19 to 25 June 1966.

In the men's competition the title was won by Romania in the team competition, Petre Purge and Constantin Rădulescu (Romania) in the pair competition and by Horst Bräutigam (East Germany) in the individual event. In the women's competition the title was won by Romania in the team competition, Marie Mikulčíková and Vlasta Šindlerová (Czechoslovakia) in the pair competition and by Vlasta Šindlerová (Czechoslovakia) in the individual event.

== Participating teams ==
=== Men ===
- Austria
- Czechoslovakia
- East Germany
- Hungary
- Italy
- Romania
- West Germany
- Yugoslavia

=== Women ===
- Austria
- Czechoslovakia
- East Germany
- Hungary
- Romania
- Yugoslavia

== Results ==
=== Men - team ===
The competition was played with 200 throws mixed (100 all, 100 clean). Teams were composed of 6 competitors
and the scores were added up.

Rank	Team	Result			
Rank	Team	All	Clear	X	Total
1st place, gold medalist(s)	Romania; Petre Purge; Constantin Rădulescu; Tiberiu Szemanyi; Vasile Măntoiu; Ion Micoroiu; Cristu Vinătoru	3575; 593; 593; 583; 556; 608; 642	1791; 313; 298; 281; 300; 322; 277	14; 5; 1; 1; 4; 1; 2	5366; 906; 891; 864; 856; 930; 919
2nd place, silver medalist(s)	East Germany; Gerhardt Grohs; Dieter Seifer; Klaus Beyer; Kristof Wlocka; Eberhard Luther; Horst Bräutigam	3514; 592; 591; 591; 568; 577; 595	1800; 302; 306; 291; 292; 293; 316	12; 1; 2; 2; 3; 4; 0	5314; 894; 897; 882; 860; 870; 911
3rd place, bronze medalist(s)	Yugoslavia; Dinko Juričević; Ivica Juričević; Dujam Smoljanović; Ivica Poleš; Leon Grom; Miroslav Steržaj	3494; 599; 595; 567; 575; 586; 572	1755; 292; 274; 266; 304; 289; 330	29; 6; 4; 7; 3; 5; 4	5249; 891; 869; 833; 879; 875; 902
4	Czechoslovakia; Jiří Ševčík; Lumír Vostřák; Miroslav Kočárek; Ivo Blažević; Pavol Halpert; František Prejsler	3476; 525; 584; 577; 579; 611; 600	1752; 266; 318; 298; 305; 272; 293	22; 8; 2; 5; 2; 2; 3	5228; 791; 902; 875; 884; 883; 893
5	West Germany; Dieter Zieher; Rolf Müller; Richard Pelikan; Adolf Käfer; Werner Grünzel; Erwin Siebert	3444; 567; 521; 575; 593; 581; 607	1708; 283; 290; 288; 294; 269; 284	19; 3; 2; 3; 2; 5; 4	5152; 850; 811; 863; 887; 850; 891
6	Hungary; József Rákos; Endre Boros; József Szabó; Gyula Várfalvi; Imre Kiss; Miklós Varga	3377; 599; 526; 581; 563; 556; 552	1705; 298; 283; 293; 283; 256; 292	28; 4; 5; 2; 4; 7; 6	5082; 897; 809; 874; 846; 812; 844
7	Austria; Walter Grünanger; Rudolf Hofer; Gerhard Pösch; Heinz Eipeldauer; Leo Schmoranzer; Ludwig Curda	3388; 579; 538; 565; 543; 563; 600	1652; 270; 276; 291; 273; 272; 270	28; 7; 6; 2; 5; 3; 5	5040; 849; 814; 856; 816; 835; 870
8	Italy; Michael Niederstätter; Emil Senoner; Siegfried Anrather; Josef Wieser; Heinrich Lintner; Adolf Schweigkofler	3281; 548; 554; 556; 532; 532; 559	1599; 225; 308; 253; 280; 280; 253	57; 15; 9; 10; 6; 6; 11	4880; 773; 862; 809; 812; 812; 812

=== Women - team ===
The competition was played with 100 throws mixed (50 all, 50 clean). Teams were composed of 6 competitors
and the scores were added up.

Rank	Team	Result			
Rank	Team	All	Clear	X	Total
1st place, gold medalist(s)	Romania; Tinca Balaban; Elena Lupescu; Crista Szöcs; Elena Trandafir; Margareta Szemanyi; Cornelia Moldoveanu	1683; 281; 281; 293; 272; 280; 276	800; 133; 142; 108; 140; 134; 143	26; 4; 7; 9; 0; 2; 4	2483; 414; 423; 401; 412; 414; 419
2nd place, silver medalist(s)	East Germany; Hanelore Cebulla; Renate Engelhardt; Christina Schulze; Annemarie Preller; Siegrid Ronninger; Ursula Rippin	1620; 250; 272; 268; 297; 270; 263	778; 125; 140; 140; 159; 108; 106	22; 3; 4; 4; 3; 2; 6	2398; 375; 412; 408; 456; 378; 369
3rd place, bronze medalist(s)	Hungary; Ernőné Hável; Györgyné Kiss; Gyuláné Tóth; Mátyásné Sallai; Gyuláné Schrett; Kálmánné Nádas	1600; 292; 263; 278; 269; 239; 259	702; 88; 129; 117; 116; 122; 130	24; 8; 1; 6; 4; 3; 2	2302; 380; 392; 395; 385; 361; 389
4	Yugoslavia; Anka Janša; Tilka Stergar; Francka Hafner; Irena Kaločaj; Cvetka Čadeź; Gorinka Erski	1569; 251; 260; 278; 256; 262; 262	722; 99; 135; 123; 110; 131; 124	30; 10; 2; 6; 8; 1; 3	2291; 350; 395; 401; 366; 393; 386
5	Austria; Elfriede Schiffmann; Johanna Kamper; Josefine Havranek; Maria Schmoranzer; Frieda Zitta; Hermine Hafenscherer	1558; 278; 244; 257; 256; 259; 264	690; 155; 96; 102; 100; 123; 114	33; 3; 10; 8; 5; 2; 5	2248; 433; 340; 359; 356; 382; 378
6	Czechoslovakia; Marie Mikulčiková; Ludmila Fürbachová; Zdeňka Těthalová; Vĕra Lauerová; Anna Jirásková; Vlasta Šindlerová	1533; 282; 249; 267; 219; 250; 266	714; 128; 102; 142; 131; 95; 116	28; 5; 4; 5; 4; 6; 4	2247; 410; 351; 409; 350; 345; 382

=== Men - pair ===
Rank	Team	Result			
Rank	Team	All	Clear	X	Total
1st place, gold medalist(s)	Romania; Petre Purge; Constantin Rădulescu	1207; 640; 567	639; 326; 313	3; 2; 1	1846; 966; 880
2nd place, silver medalist(s)	Romania; Ion Micoroiu; Cristu Vinătoru	1188; 577; 611	639; 302; 337	2; 2; 0	1827; 879; 948
3rd place, bronze medalist(s)	East Germany; Gerhardt Grohs; Horst Bräutigam	1165; 595; 570	636; 300; 336	2; 2; 0	1801; 895; 906
4	Austria; Walter Jächl; Walter Grünanger	1167; 563; 604	632; 314; 318	7; 1; 6	1799; 877; 922
5	Czechoslovakia; Ivo Blažević; Pavol Halpert	1169; 587; 582	628; 298; 330	5; 1; 4	1797; 885; 912
6	Yugoslavia; Leon Grom; Miroslav Steržaj	1158; 535; 623	631; 325; 306	5; 2; 3	1789; 860; 929
7	Czechoslovakia; Miroslav Kočárek; Lumír Vostřák	1162; 559; 603	621; 318; 303	1; 0; 1	1783; 877; 906
8	Hungary; Miklós Varga; Gyula Várfalvi	1159; 588; 571	621; 294; 327	10; 8; 2	1780; 882; 898
9	East Germany; Dieter Seifert; Klaus Beyer	1153; 573; 580	592; 293; 299	5; 3; 2	1745; 866; 879
10	Hungary; József Rákos; József Szabó	1154; 602; 552	581; 308; 273	9; 5; 4	1735; 910; 825
11	West Germany; Adolf Käfer; Dieter Zieher	1155; 555; 600	554; 281; 273	10; 5; 5	1709; 836; 873
12	Yugoslavia; Dinko Juričević; Ivica Poleś	1111; 568; 543	571; 289; 282	10; 6; 4	1682; 857; 825
13	Austria; Leo Schmoranzer; Ludwig Curda	1112; 561; 551	567; 298; 269	8; 3; 5	1679; 859; 820
14	Italy; Siegfried Anrather; Adolf Schweigkofler	1118; 556; 562	560; 272; 288	5; 3; 2	1678; 828; 850
15	France; Charles Metzger; Joseph Fritsch	1112; 540; 572	564; 276; 288	7; 4; 3	1676; 816; 860
16	West Germany; Erwin Siebert; Richard Pelikan	1118; 559; 559	553; 268; 285	5; 2; 3	1671; 827; 844
17	Italy; Michael Niederstätter; Neinrich Lintner	1083; 538; 545	549; 283; 266	8; 5; 3	1632; 821; 811
18	Switzerland; Kurt Friedli; Walter Mast	1077; 544; 533	501; 246; 255	24; 11; 13	1578; 790; 788

=== Women - pair ===
Rank	Team	Result			
Rank	Team	All	Clear	X	Total
1st place, gold medalist(s)	Czechoslovakia; Marie Mikulčíková; Vlasta Šindlerová	568; 275; 293	262; 126; 136	9; 6; 3	830; 401; 429
2nd place, silver medalist(s)	Romania; Elena Trandafir; Margareta Szemanyi	588; 285; 303	240; 123; 117	7; 2; 5	828; 408; 420
3rd place, bronze medalist(s)	East Germany; Renate Engelhardt; Annemarie Preller	571; 286; 285	242; 115; 127	8; 7; 1	813; 401; 412
4	Yugoslavia; Cvetka Čadeź; Gorinka Erski	555; 262; 293	257; 143; 114	9; 5; 4	812; 405; 407
5	East Germany; Hanelore Cebulla; Ingrid Ronninger	525; 268; 257	275; 142; 133	8; 5; 3	800; 410; 390
6	Hungary; Mária Czakó; Gyuláné Tóth	531; 255; 276	264; 122; 142	6; 3; 3	795; 377; 418
7	Hungary; Györgyné Kiss; Kálmánné Nádas	545; 255; 290	239; 108; 131	6; 3; 3	784; 363; 421
8	Romania; Elena Lupescu; Cornelia Moldoveanu	552; 287; 265	232; 123; 109	14; 6; 8	784; 410; 374
9	Austria; Elfriede Schiffmann; Hermine Dobias	562; 292; 270	214; 106; 108	10; 4; 6	776; 398; 378
10	Austria; Hermine Hafenscherer; Frieda Zitta	540; 263; 277	225; 121; 104	15; 6; 9	765; 384; 381
11	Czechoslovakia; Marta Hrádková; Zdeňka Těthalová	542; 262; 280	222; 107; 115	12; 5; 7	764; 369; 395
12	Yugoslavia; Tilka Stergar; Francka Hafner	521; 269; 252	194; 89; 105	22; 14; 8	715; 358; 357

=== Men - individual ===
Rank	Name	Qualification				Final				Result			
Rank	Name	All	Clean	X	Total	All	Clean	X	Total	All	Clean	X	Total
1st place, gold medalist(s)	(East Germany) Horst Bräutigam	592	329	0	921	613	376	0	989	1205	705	0	1910
2nd place, silver medalist(s)	(Czechoslovakia) Miroslav Kočárek	598	344	3	942	613	319	2	932	1211	663	5	1874
3rd place, bronze medalist(s)	(Romania) Ion Micoroiu	597	305	2	902	632	321	0	953	1229	626	2	1855
4	(East Germany) Eberhardt Luther	617	340	0	957	600	297	2	897	1217	637	2	1854
5	(Hungary) Gyula Várfalvi	592	339	0	931	586	311	2	897	1178	650	2	1828
6	(Romania) Cristu Vinătoru	585	326	1	911	593	322	3	915	1178	648	4	1826
7	(Socialist Federal Republic of Yugoslavia) Leon Grom	584	325	5	909	591	325	3	916	1175	650	8	1825
8	(Socialist Federal Republic of Yugoslavia) Miroslav Steržaj	598	330	1	928	585	311	2	896	1183	641	3	1824
9	(East Germany) Gerhard Grohs	585	312	2	897	605	316	2	921	1190	628	4	1818
10	(Romania) Petre Purge	579	310	1	889	618	311	0	929	1197	621	1	1818
11	(Czechoslovakia) Václav Šavlík	569	321	2	890	560	343	2	903	1129	664	4	1793
12	(Socialist Federal Republic of Yugoslavia) Dujam Smoljanović	572	308	0	880	595	288	5	883	1167	596	5	1763
13	(Czechoslovakia) Lumír Vostřak	606	288	2	894	569	294	3	863	1175	582	5	1757
14	(Socialist Federal Republic of Yugoslavia) Miroslav Ambrožić	565	307	2	872	560	323	2	883	1125	630	4	1755
15	(West Germany) Richard Pelikan	584	291	2	875	571	309	2	880	1155	600	4	1755
16	(Hungary) József Szabó	566	326	1	892	564	285	3	849	1130	611	4	1741
17	(Socialist Federal Republic of Yugoslavia) Dalmiro Vukasević	583	279	9	862	592	287	4	879	1175	566	13	1741
18	(Austria) Leo Schmoranzer	572	295	7	867	586	287	3	873	1158	582	10	1740
19	(Hungary) Endre Boros	565	298	5	863	591	285	4	876	1156	583	9	1739
20	(Hungary) József Rákos	571	295	3	866	603	269	1	872	1174	564	4	1738
21	(East Germany) Kristof Wlocka	561	300	1	861	588	285	2	873	1149	585	3	1734
22	(Socialist Federal Republic of Yugoslavia) Dinko Juričević	577	314	1	891	577	266	5	843	1154	580	6	1734
23	(West Germany) Dieter Sieghert	577	288	6	865	576	293	3	869	1153	581	9	1734
24	(Czechoslovakia) František Prejsler	583	301	3	884	565	280	4	845	1148	581	7	1729
25	(Romania) Tiberiu Szamenyi	594	273	3	867	589	268	3	857	1183	541	6	1724
26	(East Germany) Klaus Beyer	543	330	1	873	560	259	7	819	1103	589	8	1692
27	(Socialist Federal Republic of Yugoslavia) Ivica Juričević	584	272	5	856	550	261	5	811	1134	533	10	1667
28	(Switzerland) Kurt Friedli	577	278	3	855								
29	(Czechoslovakia) Pavol Halpert	589	265	3	854								
30	(Romania) Constantin Rădulescu	574	279	2	853								
31	(Hungary) Miklós Varga	576	275	7	851								
32	(Italy) Adolf Schweigkofler	538	310	0	848								
33	(East Germany) Dieter Seifert	559	288	3	847								
34	(Czechoslovakia) Ivo Blažević	564	283	2	847								
35	(France) Joseph Fritsch	558	280	3	838								
36	(West Germany) Werner Grünzel	547	289	8	836								
37	(Austria) Ludwig Curda	562	272	4	834								
38	(Italy) Josef Wieser	555	275	9	830								
39	(Austria) Walter Grünanger	591	238	3	829								
40	(Austria) Walter Braunberger	537	291	4	828								
41	(Austria) Gerhard Pösch	555	273	5	828								
42	(Italy) Michael Niederstätter	560	266	8	826								
43	(Romania) Vasile Măntoiu	576	249	4	825								
44	(West Germany) Adolf Käfer	542	280	5	822								
45	(West Germany) Erwin Siebert	565	257	6	822								
46	(Austria) Walter Jochl	555	263	1	818								
47	(Hungary) Jenő Szabó	549	267	6	816								
48	(Italy) Sigfried Anrather	566	250	3	816								
49	(Hungary) Imre Kiss	544	269	4	813								
50	(France) Charles Metzger	552	252	2	804								
51	(West Germany) Heinrich Winkler	558	237	7	795								
52	(Italy) Heinrich Lintner	552	239	6	791								
53	(Italy) Emil Senoner	530	256	6	786								
54	(Switzerland) Walter Mast	504	209	17	713								

=== Women - individual ===
Rank	Name	Qualification				Final				Result			
Rank	Name	All	Clean	X	Total	All	Clean	X	Total	All	Clean	X	Total
1st place, gold medalist(s)	(East Germany) Astrid Schmidt	283	132	4	415	283	134	5	417	566	266	9	832
2nd place, silver medalist(s)	(Socialist Federal Republic of Yugoslavia) Gorinka Erski	283	141	2	424	283	124	2	407	566	265	4	831
3rd place, bronze medalist(s)	(Austria) Elfride Schiffmann	292	129	2	421	269	139	3	408	561	268	5	829
4	(Romania) Elena Lupescu	294	133	2	427	274	128	1	402	568	261	3	829
5	(Romania) Tinca Balaban	283	123	3	406	308	115	5	423	591	238	8	829
6	(East Germany) Siegrid Rominger	279	144	1	423	268	134	2	402	547	278	3	825
7	(Romania) Elena Trandafir	292	129	1	421	275	125	3	400	567	254	4	821
8	(East Germany) Hanelore Cebulla	290	125	1	415	265	134	1	399	555	259	2	814
9	(Hungary) Gyuláné Schrett	278	116	5	394	278	141	4	419	556	257	9	813
10	(Hungary) Mária Czakó	270	132	6	402	301	110	2	411	571	242	8	813
11	(East Germany) Annemarie Preller	269	134	3	403	280	119	5	399	549	253	8	802
12	(Czechoslovakia) Marie Mikulčíková	273	140	4	413	264	118	7	382	537	258	11	795
13	(Romania) Margareta Szemanyi	283	111	1	394	270	129	5	399	553	240	6	793
14	(Socialist Federal Republic of Yugoslavia) Cvetka Čadeź	291	115	4	406	263	123	5	386	554	238	9	792
15	(Romania) Cornelia Moldoveanu	283	111	6	394	273	125	5	398	556	236	11	792
16	(Czechoslovakia) Marie Hrádková	283	112	3	395	262	125	3	387	545	237	6	782
17	(Czechoslovakia) Anna Jirásková	274	125	4	399	262	116	7	378	536	241	11	777
18	(Socialist Federal Republic of Yugoslavia) Irena Koločaj	269	124	5	393	257	123	4	380	526	247	9	773
19	(Czechoslovakia) Vlasta Šindlerová	265	132	1	397	269	97	7	366	534	229	8	763
20	(Austria) Hermine Dobias	269	120	7	389								
21	(East Germany) Christine Schulze	255	133	3	388								
22	(Czechoslovakia) Věra Lauerová	267	121	5	388								
23	(Hungary) Gyuláné Tóth	254	133	7	387								
24	(Czechoslovakia) Ludmila Fürbachová	269	116	6	385								
25	(Hungary) Mátyásné Sallai	281	104	3	385								
26	(Austria) Josefine Havranek	265	119	5	384								
27	(Hungary) Kálmánné Nádas	258	125	2	383								
28	(East Germany) Ursula Rippin	259	124	4	383								
29	(East Germany) Renate Engelhardt	274	106	2	380								
30	(Austria) Frieda Zitta	267	106	4	373								
31	(Socialist Federal Republic of Yugoslavia) Nada Kodrnja	257	113	4	370								
32	(Austria) Marie Schmoranzer	260	109	6	369								
33	(Romania) Crista Szöcs	270	96	10	366								
34	(Socialist Federal Republic of Yugoslavia) Anka Janša	255	108	1	363								
35	(Hungary) Ernőné Hável	268	94	9	362								
36	(Czechoslovakia) Zdeňka Těthalová	256	105	9	361								
37	(Austria) Hermine Hafenscherer	239	121	7	360								
38	(Socialist Federal Republic of Yugoslavia) Mara Grujin	244	95	8	339								

== Medal summary ==
=== Medal table ===
* Host nation (Host nation)

Rank	Nation	Gold	Silver	Bronze	Total
1	Romania (ROU)*	3	2	1	6
2	East Germany (GDR)	2	2	2	6
3	Czechoslovakia (TCH)	1	1	0	2
4	Yugoslavia (YUG)	0	1	1	2
5	Austria (AUT)	0	0	1	1
5	Hungary (HUN)	0	0	1	1
Totals (6 entries)		6	6	6	18

=== Men ===
Event	Gold	Silver	Bronze
Team	Romania; Petre Purge; Constantin Rădulescu; Tiberiu Szemanyi; Vasile Măntoiu; Ion Micoroiu; Cristu Vinătoru	East Germany; Gerhardt Grohs; Dieter Seifert; Klaus Beyer; Kristof Wlocka; Eberhard Luther; Horst Bräutigam	Yugoslavia; Dinko Juričević; Ivica Juričević; Dujam Smoljanović; Ivica Poleš; Leon Grom; Miroslav Steržaj
Pair	Romania; Petre Purge; Constantin Rădulescu	Romania; Ion Micoroiu; Cristu Vinătoru	East Germany; Gerhard Grohs; Horst Bräutigam
Individual	Horst Bräutigam; East Germany	Miroslav Kočárek; Czechoslovakia	Ion Micoroiu; Romania

=== Women ===
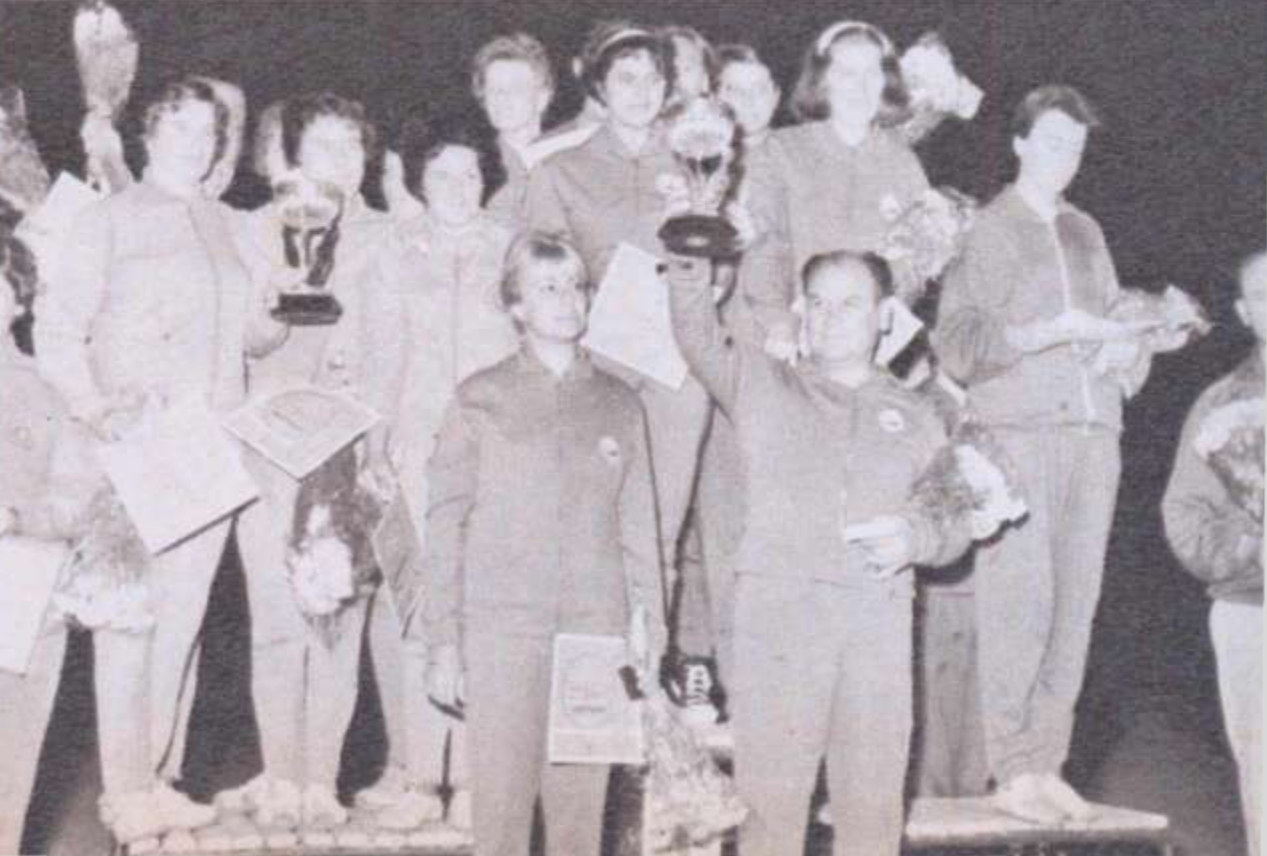
The Romanian women's team and its coach Alexandru Andrei on the top of the podium during the award ceremony.

Event	Gold	Silver	Bronze
Team	Romania; Tinca Balaban; Elena Lupescu; Crista Szöcs; Elena Trandafir; Margareta Szemanyi; Cornelia Moldoveanu	East Germany; Hanelore Cebulla; Renate Engelhardt; Christina Schulze; Annemarie Preller; Siegrid Ronninger; Ursula Rippin	Hungary; Ernőné Hável; Györgyné Kiss; Gyuláné Tóth; Mátyásné Sallai; Gyuláné Schrett; Kálmánné Nádas
Pair	Czechoslovakia; Marie Mikulčíková; Vlasta Šindlerová	Romania; Elena Trandafir; Margareta Szemenyi	East Germany; Renate Engelhardt; Annemarie Preller
Individual	Astrid Schmidt; East Germany	Gorinka Erski; Yugoslavia	Elfriede Schiffmann; Austria
