= Hernán Novick =

Uruguayan footballer (born 1988)

Personal information
- Full name: Hernán Novick Rettich
- Date of birth: 13 December 1988 (age 37)
- Place of birth: Montevideo, Uruguay
- Height: 1.74 m (5 ft 9 in)
- Position: Midfielder

Team information
- Current team: Danubio
- Number: 13

Senior career*
Years	Team	Apps	(Gls)
2010–2013	Fénix	77	(18)
2014–2016	Peñarol	37	(8)
2017	Guaraní	34	(7)
2018–2019	Cerro Porteño	56	(13)
2020	Sol de América	6	(1)
2021–2022	Universitario de Deportes	38	(12)
2023	Boston River	18	(1)
2024–	Danubio	7	(2)
- * Club domestic league appearances and goals as of 8 September 2024

Hernán Novick (born 13 December 1988) is a Uruguayan footballer who plays as an attacking midfielder for Danubio. His nickname is Sensei.

== Career ==
Novick came from the youth ranks of Rocha FC. Halfway through 2006, he moved to El Tanque Sisley of the Second Division, where he made his professional debut. He kept a notable performance throughout the 2007-08 season, with his club ultimately losing the promotion playoff against Villa Española.

In 2008, Novick signed for recently promoted Villa Española, which ended up being relegated at the end of a poor campaign. Due to a serious injury, he spent the final semester of 2009 without a team.

In 2010, he signed for recently promoted Centro Atlético Fénix, where he had good performances, qualifying for and playing the 2011 Copa Sudamericana, where the club was eliminated in the first round by eventual champions Universidad de Chile. At Fénix, Novick was given the number 10 jersey and was a key player for three and a half years.

After the 2013 season, he decided among various offers to sign for Peñarol, due to being a club supporter, with a contract for three years. Novick was given the number 7 jersey and played with the team for three seasons, standing out due to his performances, playing in the 2014 and 2016 Copa Libertadores, where he scored twice in a group stage 4–3 home victory against Sporting Cristal, and in the 2015 Copa Sudamericana.

== Family ==
Novick is the son of businessman and politician Edgardo Novick and the brother of footballer Marcel Novick.
