= Grem, Uttar Pradesh =

Grem
- Village
- Location within Uttar Pradesh
- Coordinates: 28°31′36″N 79°36′21″E
- Country: India
- State: Uttar Pradesh
- Elevation: 185 m (607 ft)

Population (Census 2011)
  - Total: 2,908

Languages
  - Official: Hindi
- Time zone: UTC+5:30 (IST)
- PIN: 262407
- Nearest city: Nawabganj, Bareilly, Pilibhit
- Literacy: 64%
- cold: cold (Köppen)

Grem is a village in Nawabganj of Bareilly district, in Uttar Pradesh, India.

As per constitution of India and Panchyati Raaj Act, Grem village is administered by Sarpanch (Head of Village) who is elected representative of village.
