= Alyaksandr Novik (footballer, born 1994) =

Belarusian footballer

Personal information
- Date of birth: 15 October 1994 (age 32)
- Place of birth: Biaroza, Brest Oblast, Belarus
- Height: 1.92 m (6 ft 4 in)
- Position: Defender

Youth career
- Bereza

Senior career*
Years	Team	Apps	(Gls)
2011–2012	Dinamo-2 Minsk	33	(1)
2013	Kobrin	8	(0)
2014	Bereza-2010	0	(0)
2015	Kolos-Druzhba	16	(2)
2016	Dinamo Brest	13	(1)
2017	Kotwica Kołobrzeg	9	(1)
2017	Slonim-2017	6	(0)
2018	Smorgon	14	(0)
2018	Torpedo-BelAZ Zhodino	0	(0)
2019	Belshina Bobruisk	13	(1)
2020	Naftan Novopolotsk	24	(5)
Total		136	(11)
- * Club domestic league appearances and goals

Alyaksandr Novik (Belarusian: Аляксандр Новiк; Russian: Александр Новик; born 15 October 1994) is a Belarusian former professional footballer who played as a defender.
