= Andreas Chyliński =

Polish composer

Andreas Chyliński (also known as Andrzej Chyliński) (b. ca. 1590 in Poland; d. after 1635 in Padua) was a Polish composer.

His life is not well known; between 1630 and 1635, he lived as a Franciscan Friar in Padua, where he was maestro di cappella at the Basilica of Saint Anthony of Padua. Of his music, sixteen canons survive.

== Biography ==
Around 1625, he served as a music master at the convent in Drohiczyn. In 1630, he traveled to Padua, where he exercised his ministry as a priest and musician at the Basilica of Saint Anthony, becoming a bass in the choir and, in 1632, Maestro di cappella (choirmaster) for the Veneranda Arca.
