= Grom: Terror in Tibet =

2002 video game

- Developer: Rebelmind
- Publisher: CDV Software Entertainment
- Platform: Windows
- Release: DE: 25 November 2002; UK: 7 February 2003; NA: 11 March 2003
- Genre: Action-adventure
- Mode: Single-player

Grom: Terror in Tibet (Polish: Grom: terror w Tybecie) is an action-adventure video game by Polish developer Rebelmind and published by CDV Software Entertainment in Germany in 2002 and worldwide in 2003. Described as an "action role-playing game", the game involves the control of a party of three characters to defeat Nazis in a fictionalised Second World War, seeking the source of mythical weapons in Tibet. The developers designed the game to imitate the tone and narrative of Indiana Jones, stating a desire to return to a "mysterious charm of old adventure games", placing a heavier focus on narrative development and adventure game elements compared to other action games in the genre. Terror in Tibet received a mixed reception from critics, with the game receiving praise for its unique blend of genres, and criticism for its difficult combat and controls, and poor localisation and dialogue.

== Plot ==
In an alternate Second World War, the Nazis direct their forces to Tibet to seek the lost city of the ancient King Arjuna, which legend states contain weapons powerful enough to destroy cities. The player character, Colonel Grom, fought the Nazis in his home country Poland, escaping after its fall and meeting capture by the Soviet forces in Kazakhstan. Upon his escape and attempt to return to join the British forces in Europe, Grom succumbs to a blizzard. He is revived by a Tibetan lama and restored to health, and joins forces with Petr, a Czech smuggler, to resist the Nazi invasion of Tibet and save the world.

== Gameplay ==
In-game screenshot of Grom: Terror in Tibet.

Gameplay in Terror in Tibet follows the conventions of action-adventure games, with players controlling three characters to navigate three-dimensional top-down maps to complete 100 missions over seven chapters. Combat is a mixture of direct combat and stealth, with options to take cover or lie low to avoid confrontation, although all enemies need to be defeated in order to progress a mission. Players control characters using a drag-box to group characters and issue orders, and use a wheel-based scroll menu to select movement commands. The game features several different weapons, including blunderbusses and machine guns, with each character having a different level of proficiency with each weapon, determining its damage.

Although primarily an action-based game, Terror in Tibet imports a number of role-playing mechanics into the game. The game features an inventory of weapons and a simplified series of skills and abilities for characters, including strength, intelligence, and agility. The player also has minor party management, discovering up to 40 characters to join the party of three over the game, and players are able to allocate statistics, give orders and suggest actions. The game also features a trading system in which players complete a card-based minigame to bargain with traders, with the outcome of the game determining whether prices increase or decrease.

== Reception ==
Reception

Aggregate score
Aggregator	Score
Metacritic	51/100

Review scores
Publication	Score
Computer Gaming World	1.5/5
GameSpot	3.8
GameSpy	38%
IGN	8/10
PC PowerPlay	55%
Game Chronicles	7.0

Terror in Tibet received "mixed or average reviews" from contemporary critics, according to review aggregator Metacritic. Positive coverage of Terror in Tibet focused on the unique approach to the game's combat and gameplay. Writing for PC PowerPlay, Daniel Wilks stated the game's wheel system was "interesting and quite intuitive", also praising the "novel and quite fun" haggling card game. Ryan Bohmann of IGN described Terror in Tibet as "overall a fun game", stating the game was "unique and interesting". John Bowlin of Game Chronicles praised the game for its "unique blend of action and RPG elements as well as having a tactical depth to the game that many games lack."

Negative reviews of the game critiqued the lack of depth in the game's role-playing and combat mechanics. Ron Dulin of GameSpot noted the game had "no real tactics or strategy", stating that "while Grom has all the appearances of a tactical game, including the ability to lie prone and crouch, you mostly just run around and exchange fire with the enemy until one of you is dead." Similarly, Kevin Rice of GameSpy stated the game's strategy aspects were poorly implemented, noting that "while you can pause the game to analyze your strategy, you cannot issue attack commands here. Since attacking is what you do most of, this makes no sense." Daniel Wilks of PC PowerPlay noted that "Grom combines elements of action roleplaying and small unit strategy but fails to equal the sum of its parts."

Several critics expressed frustration with the game's difficulty. Writing for IGN, Ryan Bohmann stated that the absence of a difficulty setting made aspects of the game "extremely hard", citing enemies that are able to kill a party member in one hit. Ron Dulin of GameSpot stated the gameplay was "frustrating", citing the "outnumbered and outgunned" mission design, the rarity of healing items, and the requirement to defeat all enemies to complete a mission. Charles Ardai of Computer Gaming World, who dismissed the game as "basically impossible to play", noted "a single battle can require you to save and reload a dozen times", citing the imprecise controls and difficulty in managing characters during a "crowded fight scene".

Reviewers outside of Germany also complained of the poor localisation and dialogue of the game. Kevin Rice of GameSpy critiqued the dialogue as "poorly translated and usually poorly acted". Daniel Wilks of PC PowerPlay critiqued the "rather large conversations had with a number of NPC characters", stating they had "little in the way of player choice", did "little to add to the flavour of the game", and were peppered with what can be loosely termed as humour - bad jokes more likely to raise an eyebrow or groan." Darren Gladstone of Computer Gaming World stated the game earned an "honorable mention" for its amusingly poor voice acting, stating "you now know where bad voice actors go to die."
