= List of ship launches in 1765 =

The list of ship launches in 1765 includes a chronological list of some ships launched in 1765.

Date	Ship	Class	Builder	Location	Country	Notes
22 February	Suffolk	Third rate	John Randall	Rotherhithe	Great Britain	For Royal Navy.
7 March	Artésien	Artesien-class ship of the line	Joseph-Louis Ollivier	Brest	Kingdom of France	For French Navy.
7 March	San Zaccharia	Ship of the line	Agostino & Giuseppe Scolaro	Senglea Dockyard	Malta	For Navy of the Order of Saint John.
9 March	Invincible	Ramillies-class ship of the line	John & William Wells	Deptford	Great Britain	For Royal Navy.
21 April	Europa	Exeter-class ship of the line	Henry Adams	Lepe	Great Britain	For Royal Navy.
Unknown date	San Giacomo	Leon Trionfante-class ship of the line		Venice	Republic of Venice	For Venetian Navy.
7 May	Victory	First rate		Chatham Dockyard	Great Britain	For Royal Navy.
11 May	Flamand	Bordelois-class ship of the line	Léon Guignace	Bordeaux	Kingdom of France	For French Navy.
4 June	Prince of Wales	Ramillies-class ship of the line	Bird and Fisher	Milford Haven	Great Britain	For Royal Navy.
30 June	Trekh Ierarkhov	Slava Rossii-class ship of the line	D. Ulfov	Saint Petersburg	Russia	For Imperial Russian Navy.
20 July	Monarch	Ramillies-class ship of the line	Adam Hayes	Deptford Dockyard	Great Britain	For Royal Navy.
2 August	Duke of Cumberland	East Indiaman	John Perry	Blackwall	Great Britain	For British East India Company.
19 August	Grom	Donder-class bomb vessel	I. Davydov	Saint Petersburg	Russia	For Imperial Russian Navy.
16 September	Prince of Wales	East Indiaman	John Perry	Blackwall	Great Britain	For British East India Company.
17 September	Canada	Canada-class ship of the line	Joseph Harris	Woolwich Dockyard	Great Britain	For Royal Navy.
September	Halifax	Topsail schooner		Halifax Naval Yard	(Kingdom of Great Britain) Nova Scotia	For Joseph Grey.
12 October	Saint-Esprit	Saint-Esprit-class ship of the line	Joseph-Louis Ollivier	Brest	Kingdom of France	For French Navy.
1 November	Lioness	East Indiaman	Thomas West	Deptford	Great Britain	For British East India Company.
23 December	San Genaro	Velasco-class ship of the line	Augustin & Juan de Monteceli	Cartagena	Spain	For Spanish Navy.
Unknown date	César	Cat		Port-d'Envaux	Kingdom of France	For French Navy.
Unknown date	Earl Fauconberg	Merchantman		Whitby	Great Britain	For private owner.
Unknown date	Lord Ligonier	Slave ship		New England	Thirteen Colonies	For James Debatt and Daniel Vialars.
Unknown date	Norske Løve	Third rate		Copenhagen	Denmark-Norway	For Dano-Norwegian Navy.
Unknown date	San Carlos	First rate		Bilbao	Spain	For Spanish Navy.
Unknown date	San Fernando	Third rate	Matthew Mullins	Havana	(Spain) Cuba	For Spanish Navy.
Unknown date	Speedwell	Schooner		Bombay	India	For Bombay Pilot Service.
