= Cipriani Towers =

- Alternative names: Cipriani Residences

General information
- Location: Punta del Este, Uruguay
- Coordinates: 34.942°S 54.917°W

Design and construction
- Developer: Cipriani Group
- Main contractor: Criba

The Cipriani Towers are a residential skyscraper complex located in Punta del Este, Uruguay. The towers are which under construction. The tallest of the three towers comprising the complex, designed by Rafael Viñoly, will rise to a height of 320 m.

== History ==
The site of the complex, partly occupied by the historic Hotel San Rafael, was acquired in 2018 by the Italian hospitality group Cipriani for approximately $40 million.

The group launched a project consisting to develop the three residential towers, and reconstruct the historic hotel. Construction of the new complex, designed by architect Rafael Viñoly, was awarded to Argentine construction company Criba.

The structural work on the first tower is expected to be completed in 2027.

== Description ==
The complex is located on the Punta del Este Atlantic waterfront. It consists of three residential towers measuring 170 meters (38 stories), 260 meters (55 stories), and 320 meters (72 stories), respectively.
