= Józef Chyliński =

Polish resistance fighter (1904–1985)

Józef Chyliński (2 October 1904 — 9 June 1985) (codenames 'Kamień', 'Grom' and 'Julian') was a Polish soldier and resistance fighter, recipient of the Silver Star of the Virtuti Militari, Cross of Valour (Krzyż Walecznych) and Gold Cross of Merit with Swords (Krzyż Zasługi z Mieczami).

Jabłonowski, born in Gosslershausen (Jabłonowo Pomorskie), West Prussia (today Poland), graduated from military academy in Poznań. Before the war, he served in the HQ of Okrągu Korpusu nr VII under gen. Tadeusz Kutrzeba, and in 1938 was the officer in charge of the special forces section.

During the Invasion of Poland with the rank of captain he took part in the Battle of Modlin. He organized a chapter of Służba Zwycięstwu Polski (later transformed into Związek Walki Zbrojnej and then into Armia Krajowa) in Pomorze. He was instrumental in coordinating the activities of various Polish resistance organizations in the Pomorze region, until the majority of them merged into Armia Krajowa. After the death of Józef Ratajczak in May 1940, he was the unofficial commander of Polish resistance in Pomorze. From 1943 he was commander of staff of Komenda Okręgu Armii Krajowej Pomorze under Komendant Okręgu Jan Pałubicki (codename 'Janusz'). During that time, he lived mostly in Toruń, although every few months he traveled to Warsaw for meetings with commanders of AK (Stefan Rowecki and Tadeusz Komorowski).

He was involved in the spying on the Peenemünde Nazi rocket facility, as one of the links between Polish operatives in the field, AK HQ, and through them, the Western Allies. Together with Marian Górski (codename "Wencel"), the chief of Kedyw espionage unit, he organized Operation Gotingen-Vulkan, involving spreading Polish resistance actions (espionage, sabotage, propaganda) throughout Germany itself.

His wife, a courier for the Polish resistance, died in the Warsaw Uprising, 1944.

From 1945 to 1947 he was imprisoned by the communist regime of the People's Republic of Poland. Released in 1947, he refused to join the communist Armia Ludowa, escaped through Sweden to the United Kingdom (where the Polish Government in Exile promoted him to Lieutenant Colonel), then emigrated to Toronto, Canada, where he lived the rest of his life.
