= Novik-class frigate =

Class overview
- Name: Novik class (Project 1244.1)
- Builders: Yantar Zavod, Kaliningrad
- Operators: Russian Navy
- Canceled: 1

General characteristics
- Type: Frigate
- Displacement: 3,000 tonnes
- Length: 120 m (394 ft)
- Propulsion: 2 cruise GTA units M-62M, power sum 12000 hp (8820 kW), 2 boost GTU M-90, power sum 37000 hp (27.2 MW); 1 DG generator DG-800 power kW 800, 3 DG DG-600 kW 600; 1 вал shaft axis, 1 гребной винт helix screw rudder

The Novik-class frigate, Project 1244.1, or Grom class, as it is sometimes referred to, was a planned Russian multipurpose patrol ship class. The Novik class was the first attempt by Russia since the collapse of the Soviet Union to construct a large surface warship. It was designed to perform patrol missions, search for and kill enemy submarines, escort naval ships, and defend the coast of Russia.

The first and only ship in the Novik class was laid down on 26 July 1997. In the late 1990s, work on the ship stopped because of budget restraints. At this point the ship was only 5 percent complete. In the 2000 Russian defence budget the ship received more funding and the work on the ship continued. In 2004, however, work was again stopped, and in 2005 the project was cancelled. It was announced the ship would be finished as the training ship Borodino but in 2009 it was reported that the unfinished ship would be offered for sale overseas. In 2016 it was announced that the Yantar shipyard had no interest in completing what it regarded as an outdated design and would scrap the unfinished hull in order to free up space to work on more cost effective projects.

== Variants ==
- Project 12441U class from the 12411 project class.

== See also ==
- List of ships of the Soviet Navy
- List of ships of Russia by project number

== Sources ==
- http://www.warfare.ru/?lang=&linkid=2101&catid=270
- https://www.globalsecurity.org/military/world/russia/1244_1.htm
- http://www.janes.com/products/janes/defence-security-report.aspx?id=1065926961
