= Furzehill =

Furzehill may refer to the following places in England:

- Furze Hill SSSI, a Site of Special Scientific Interest in Cambridgeshire
- Furzehill, Devon, a hamlet in Devon
- Furzehill, Dorset, a location
- Furze Hill, a hamlet in Hampshire
- Furzehills, a hamlet in Lincolnshire

== See also ==
- Furzehill Plantation, in Devon
- Furzehill Wood, in Dorset
