= Friezland Wood =

Woodland in Kent, England

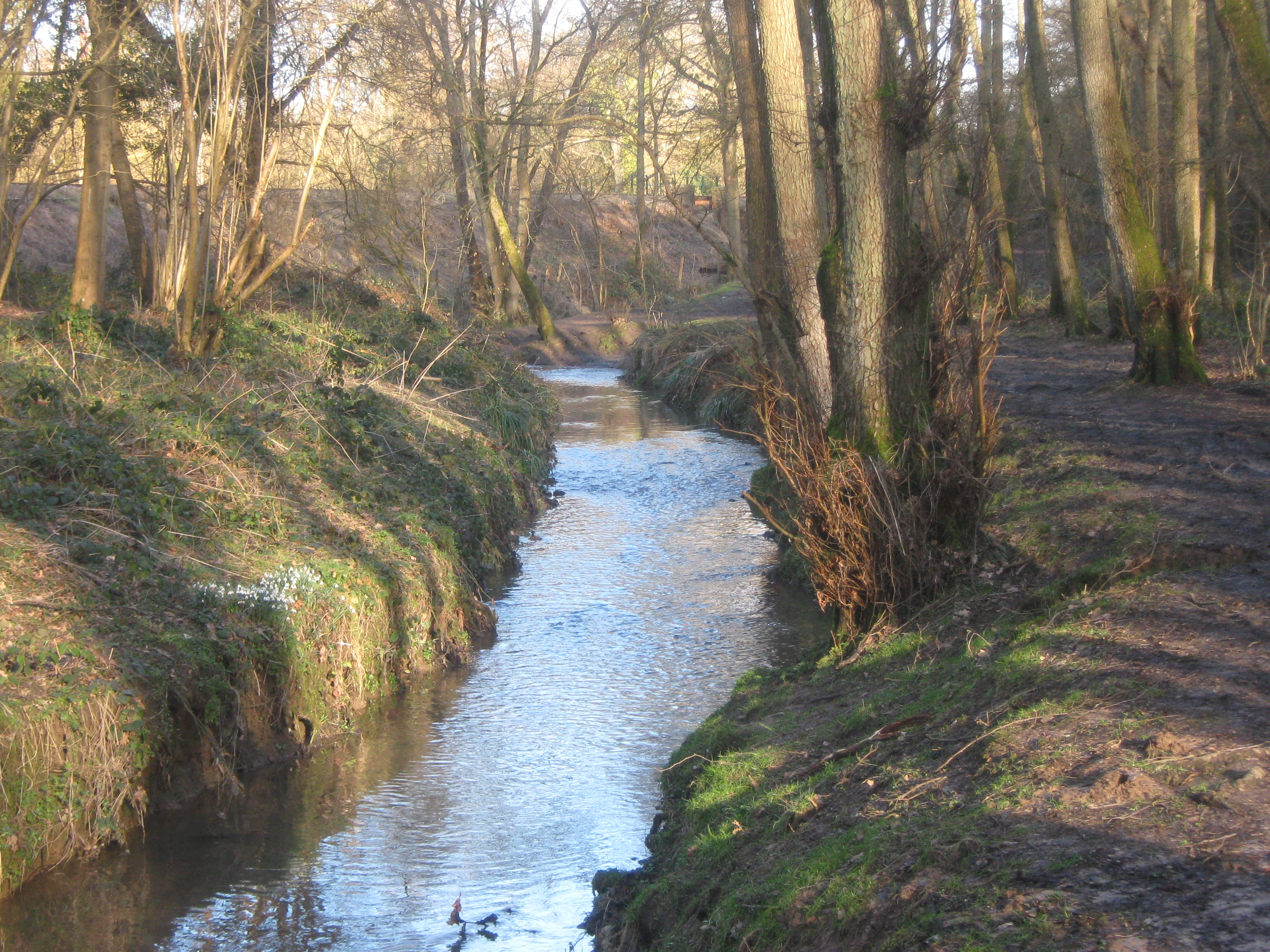
- River Grom and footpath

- Location within Kent
- Interactive map of Friezland Wood

Geography
- Location: Kent, England
- OS grid: TQ562383
- Coordinates: 51.123°N 0.231°E
- Area: 7.69 hectares (19.00 acres)

Administration
- Authority: Woodland Trust

Friezland Wood is a woodland in Kent, England, near Tunbridge Wells. It covers a total area of 7.69 hectares (19.00 acres). It is owned and managed by the Woodland Trust.
