= Fountains Wood =

- Location within Cheshire
- Interactive map of Fountains Wood

Geography
- Location: Cheshire, England
- OS grid: SJ548826
- Coordinates: 53.338°N 2.679°W
- Area: 1.08 hectares (2.67 acres)

Administration
- Authority: Woodland Trust

Fountains Wood is a woodland in Cheshire, England, near Runcorn. It covers a total area of 1.08 hectares (2.67 acres). It is owned and managed by the Woodland Trust.
