= Uplyme =

Village in Devon, England

Coordinates: 50.7337°N 2.9503°W

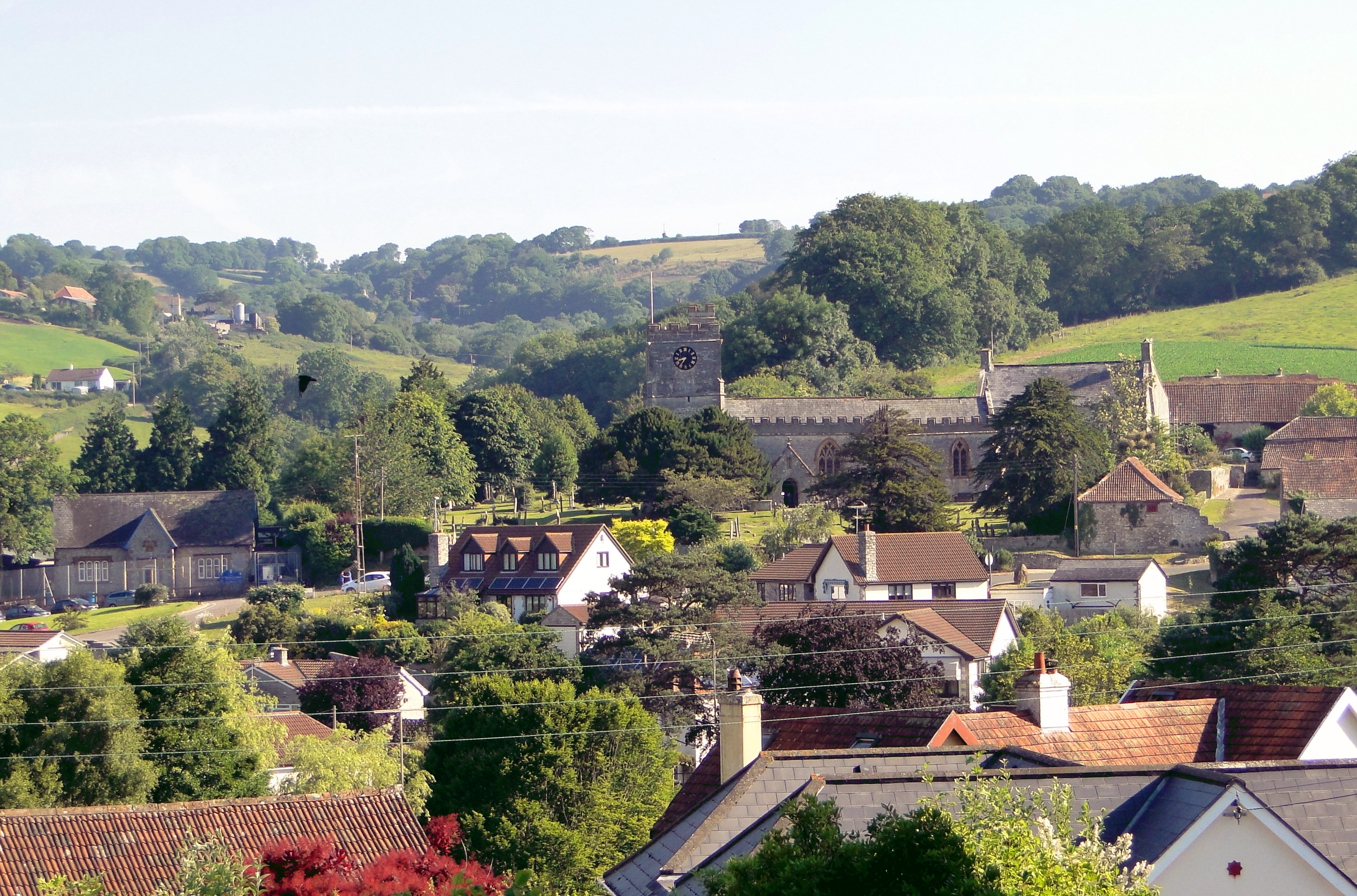
- Uplyme village

- Location within Devon
- Population: 1,663
- OS grid reference: SY3293
- Shire county: Devon
- Region: South West
- Country: England
- Sovereign state: United Kingdom
- Post town: Lyme Regis
- Postcode district: DT7
- Dialling code: 01297
- Police: Devon and Cornwall
- Fire: Devon and Somerset
- Ambulance: South Western

Uplyme is an English village and civil parish in East Devon on the Devon-Dorset border and the River Lym, adjacent to the Dorset coastal town of Lyme Regis. It has a population of approximately 1700 recounted as 1663 at the 2011 census. Uplyme is situated in the electoral ward of Trinity whose population at the above census was 2,521.

== History and background ==
The parish of Uplyme has one of the largest boundaries in England—in excess of 16 miles (26 km), the area of the village being approximately 3,618 acres (14.64 km^{2}).

The remains of a Romano-British villa were excavated near to the village in 1850. The earliest recorded reference to the parish was in AD740 when Cynewulf, King of Wessex gifted the manor of Uplyme to Glastonbury Abbey. The Domesday Book mentions the village.

The parish church of St. Peter and St. Paul lies within the village and is located adjacent to the primary school. The church is thought to have been founded in the 9th century, but the 14th-century tower is the oldest part of the present structure.

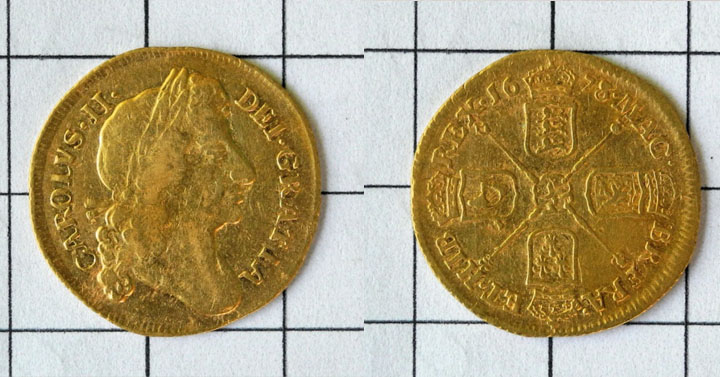
A gold half-guinea of Charles II, minted in 1678 and found in Uplyme in 2013

The village hall is situated a few hundred yards from the church, with adjacent playing fields containing a children's play area and two cricket pavilions (one is disused). The old village hall was replaced by the modern building in 1993 and was financed by fundraising and grant funding under the leadership of villager Adrian Pearson.

== Primary school ==
Mrs Ethelston's C of E Primary School is named after Mrs Anne Ethelston (1799–1854), the wife of the Reverend Charles Wicksted Ethelston. After her death, Charles Ethelston erected a building in his wife's memory in order to house the already existing school. The main building was not opened until 1873, a year after his death.

The school houses around 200 pupils, encompassing seven years in seven classes. The school consists of three buildings, an early 1990s building for reception to year 2 known as Wood Haven, and another building is being built, whilst the main original old building is home to years 3, 4, 5 and 6, as well as the staff and administration areas.

== Facilities ==
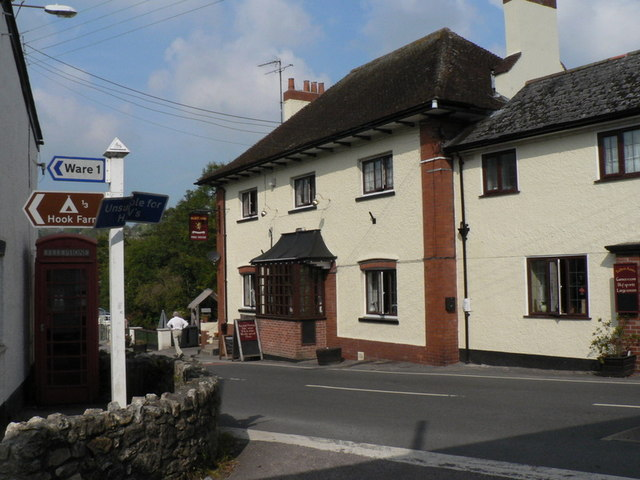
Talbot Arms, A pub on the main road through Uplyme, England

The Black Dog and The New Inn public houses have closed, leaving just the Talbot Arms which has reduced in size from two to one bars, has accommodation and serves food. The Black Dog was supposedly named after a phantom black dog which led a farmer to a hoard of Stuart coins, which he then used to purchase the inn.

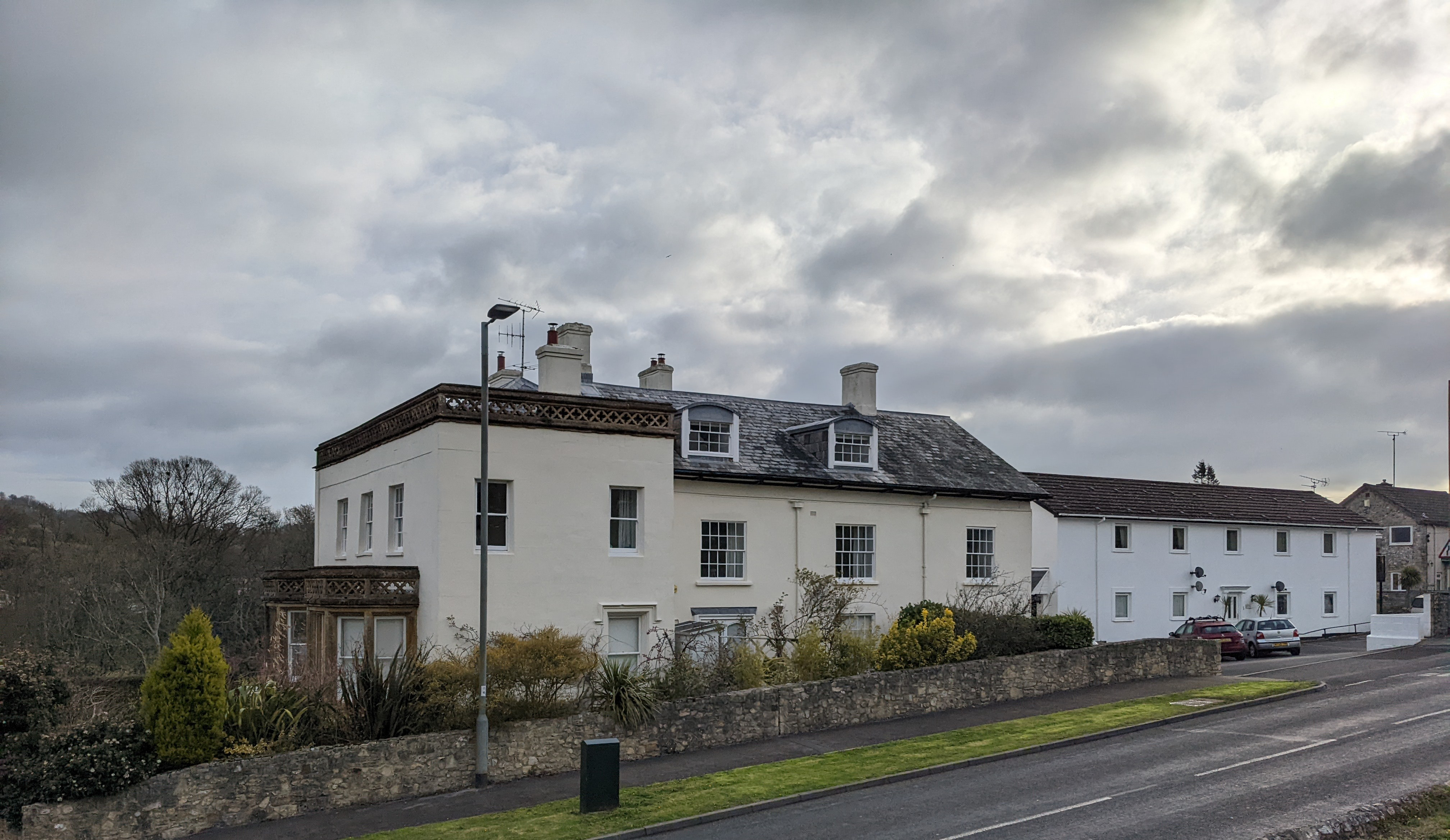
Devon Hotel, formerly the vicarage, now converted to flats

The last hotel, The Devon Hotel, (formerly the vicarage) was converted to flats with the extensive grounds being developed for housing. Shops were reduced to one when the village butchers closed. There is filling station in the village. As with many villages Uplyme has a village hall that was rebuilt in 1994 after a monumental fund raising effort by the local people, run as a charity the village hall relies on funding from revenue raised by hiring out the halls facilities.

Nearby is Furzehill Plantation a 1.22 hectares (3.01 acres) woodland owned and managed by the Woodland Trust.

A 5.5 km footpath at the rear of the Talbot Arms follows the river Lym down to Lyme Regis

== Historic building ==
Uplyme has a number of buildings that are "listed", some examples are :-

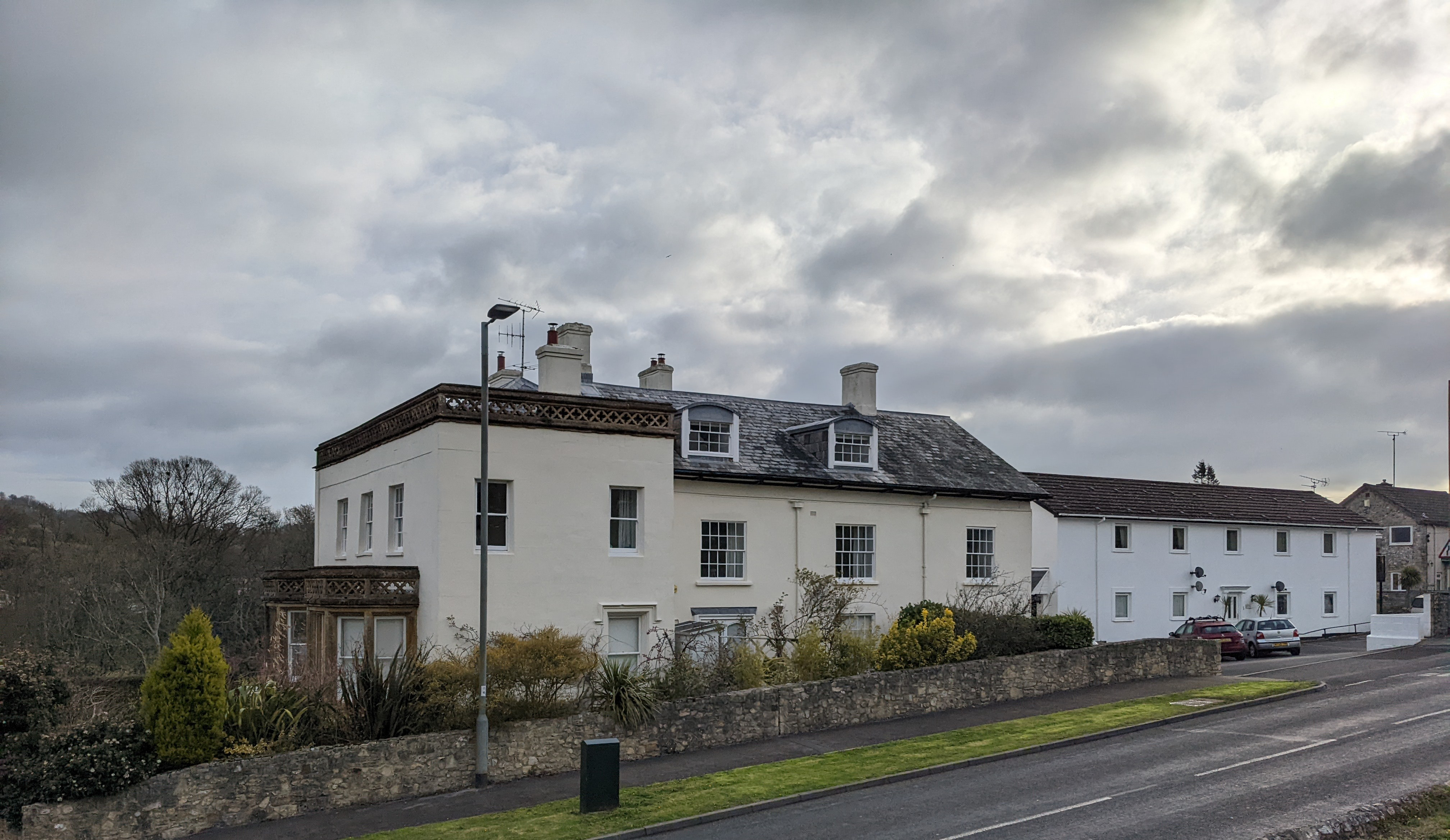
Devon Hotel

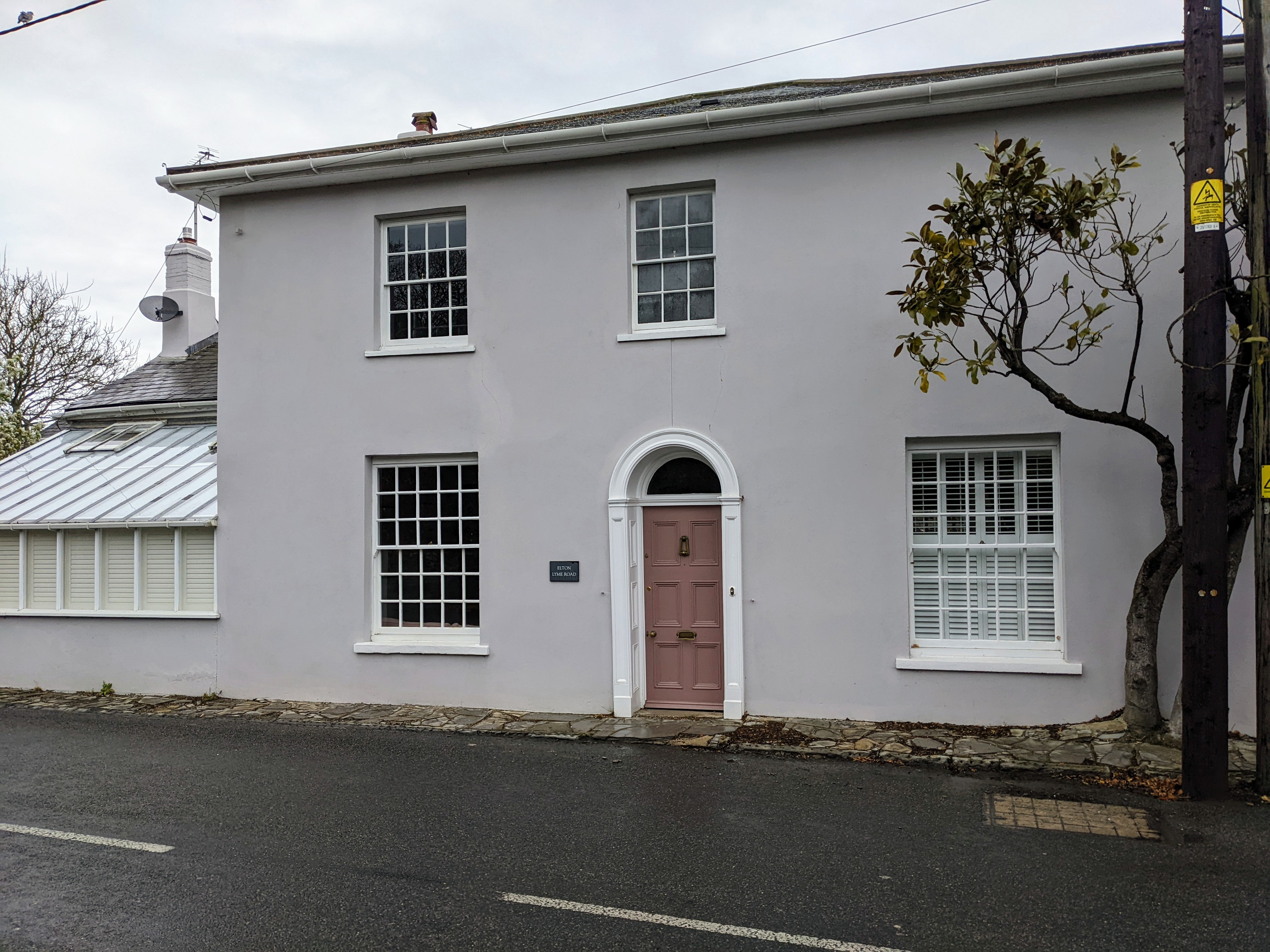
Elton

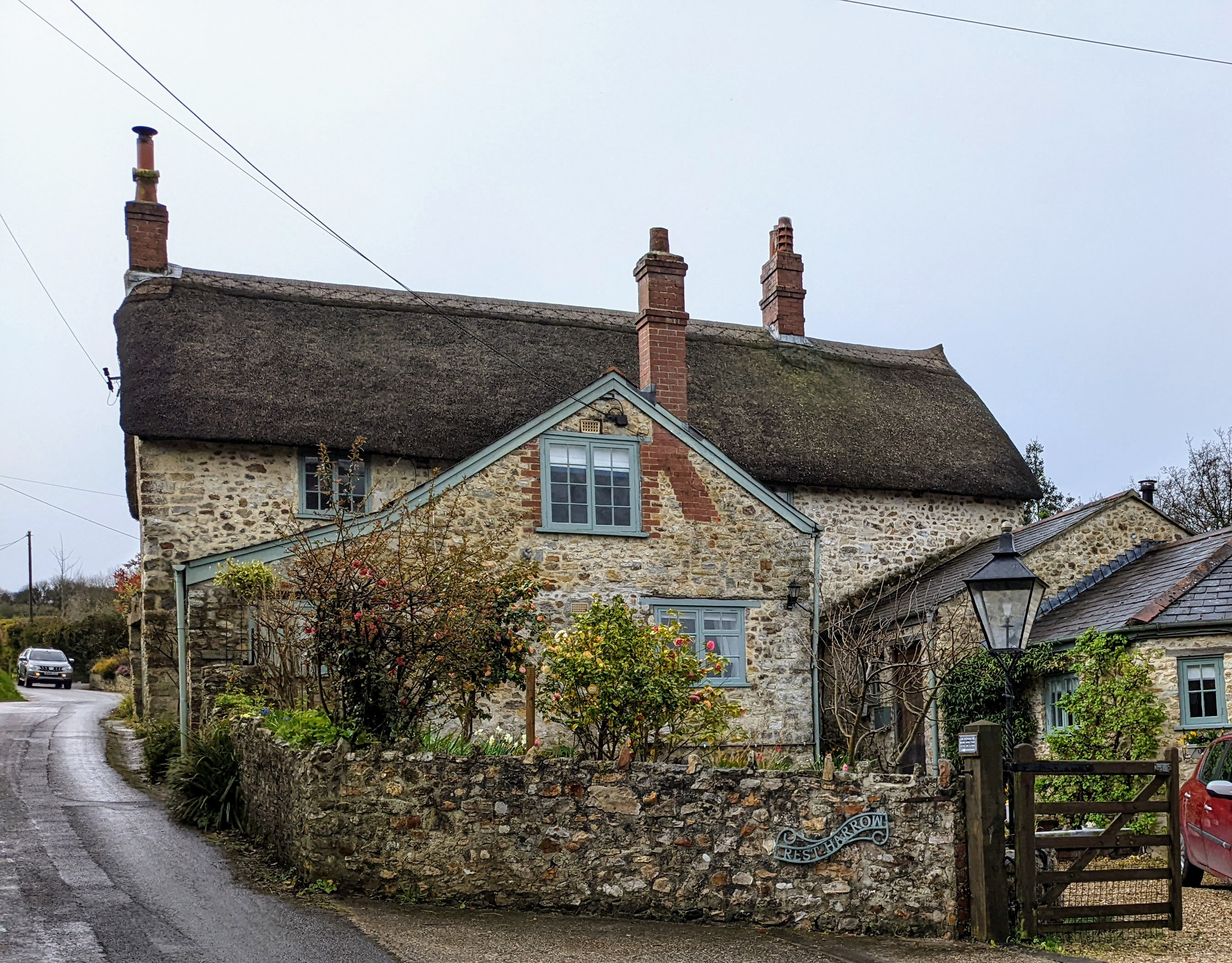
Rest Harrow

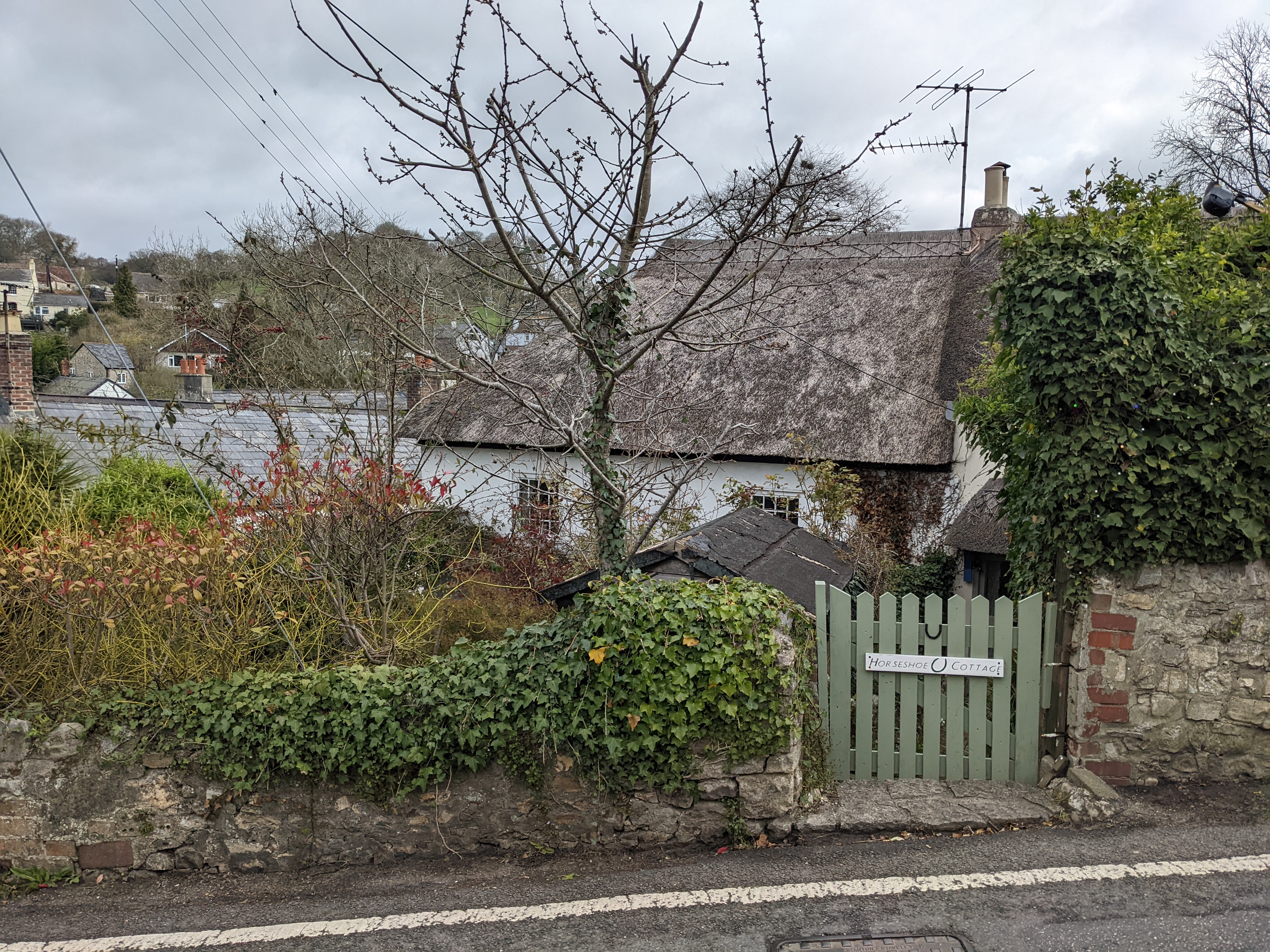
Horseshoe Cottage

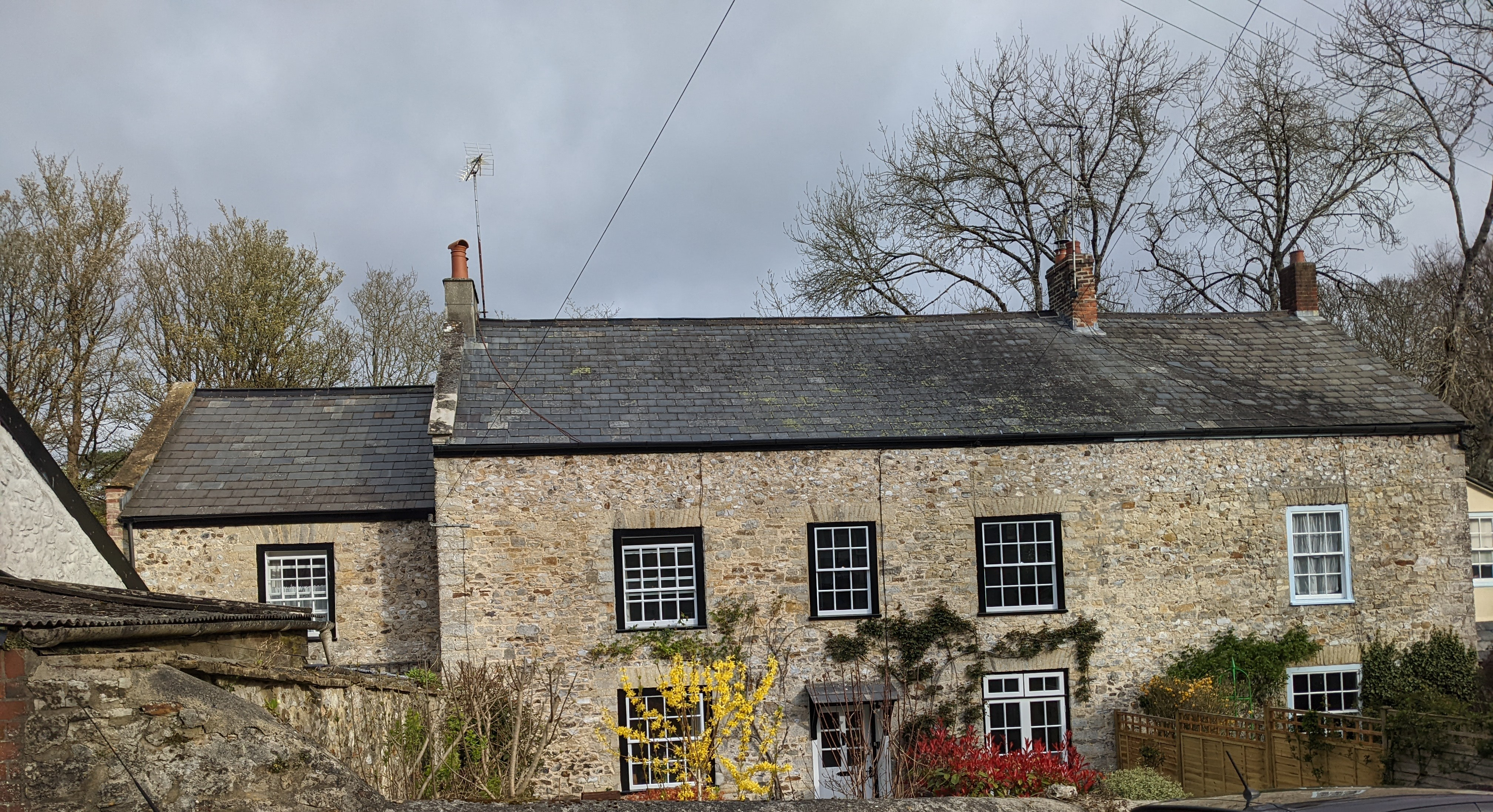
Tor Cottage

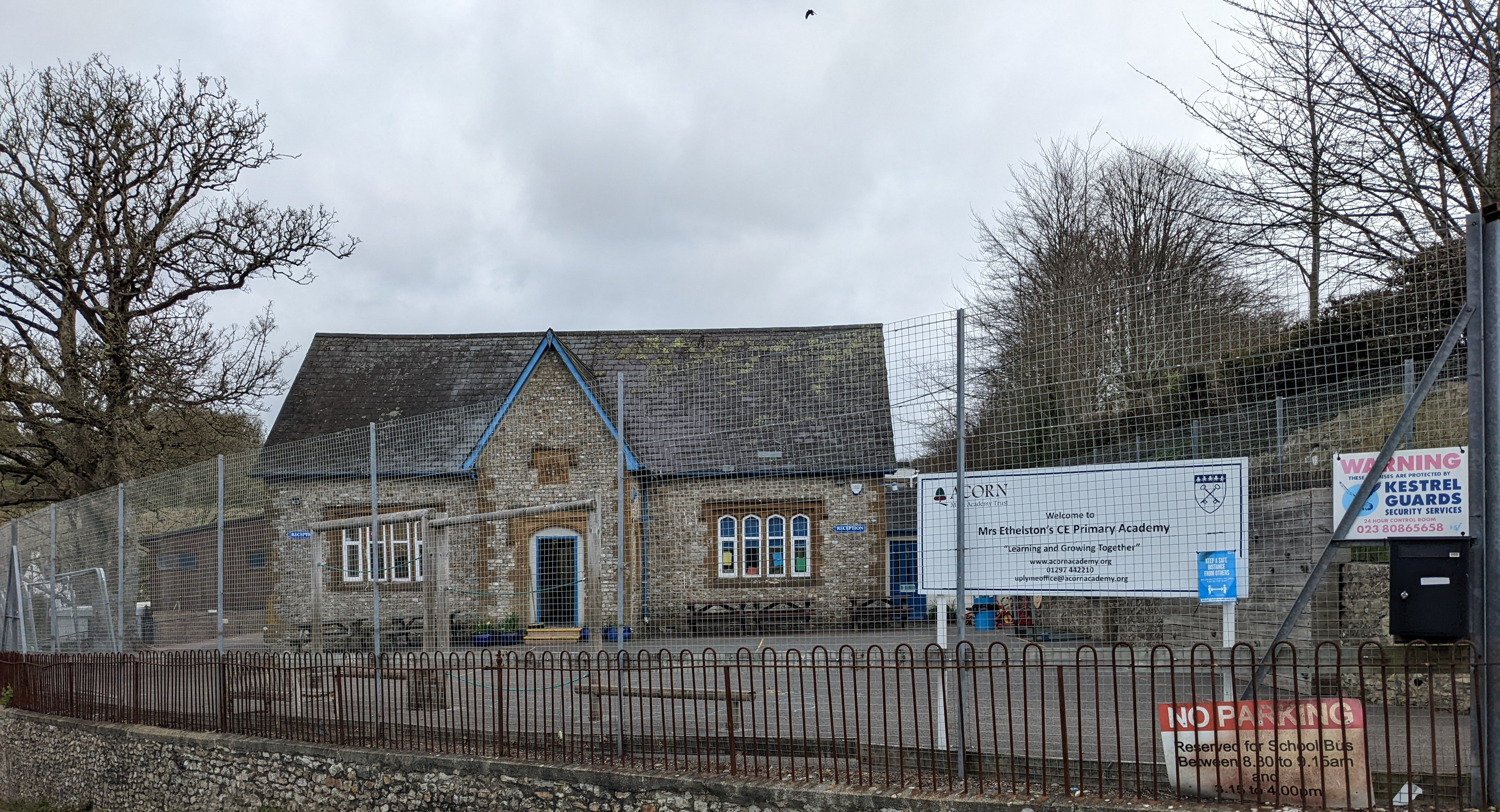
Mrs Ethelston's CofE Academy

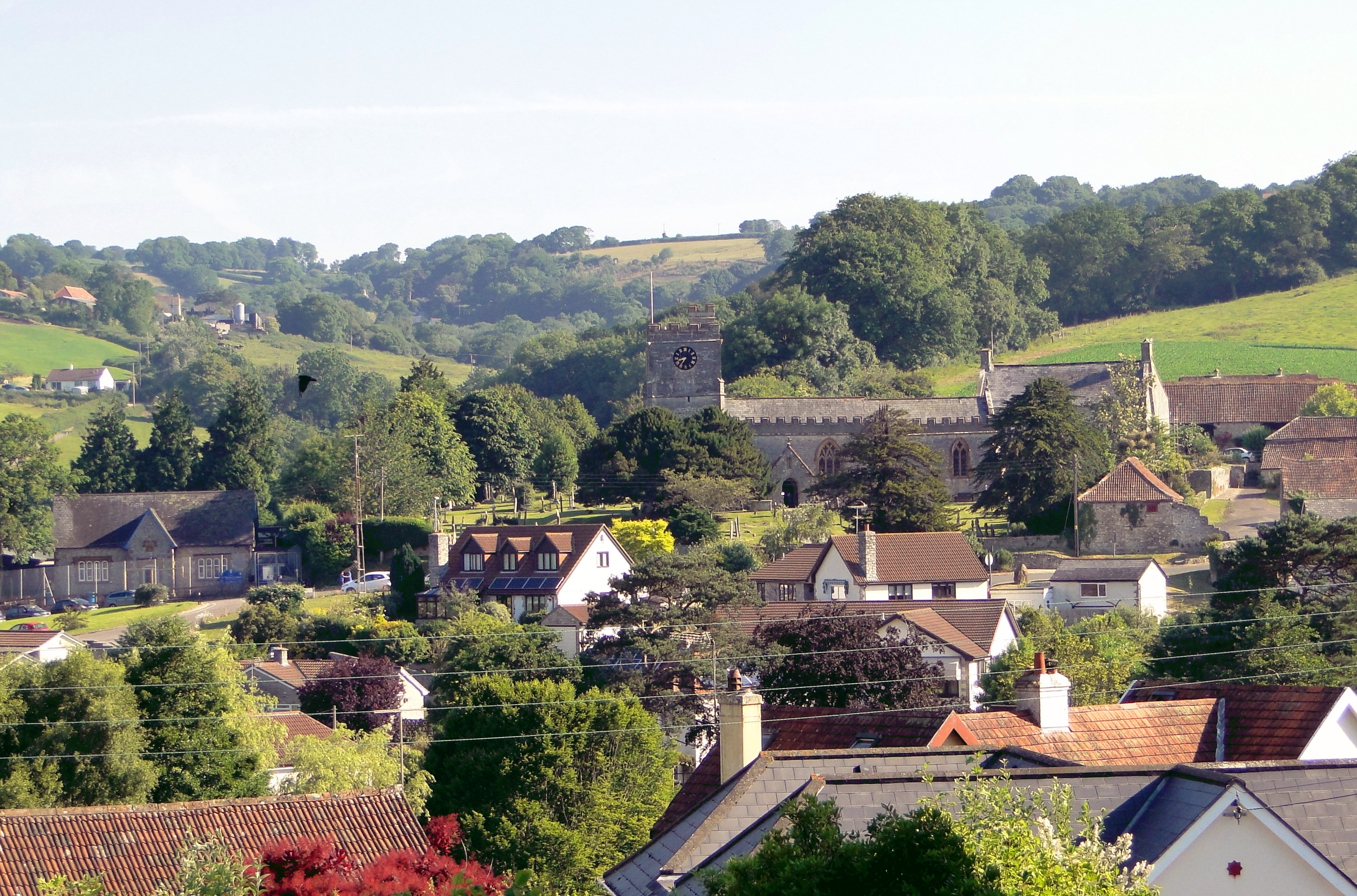
Church of St Peter and St Paul

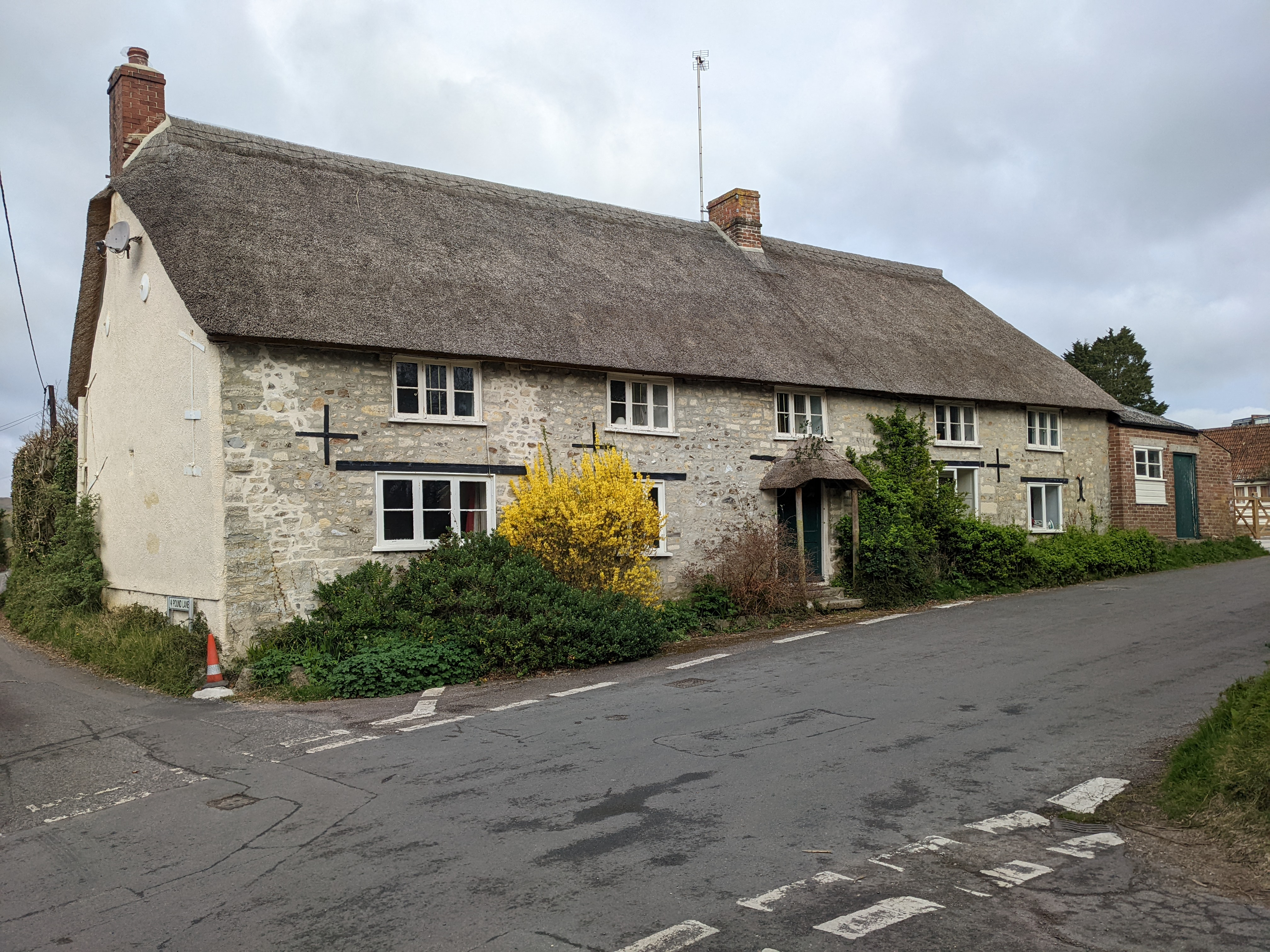
Lane End Farmhouse

== Notable people ==
Percy Fawcett and its family lived in Waterside House, Uplyme during the time he was looking for the City of Z
