= Five Ponds Copse =

Woodland in Cheshire, England

- Location within Cheshire
- Interactive map of Five Ponds Copse

Geography
- Location: Cheshire, England
- OS grid: SJ591903
- Coordinates: 53.4087°N 2.6164°W
- Area: 1.15 hectares (2.84 acres)

Administration
- Authority: Woodland Trust

Five Ponds Copse is a woodland in Cheshire, England, near Warrington. It covers a total area of 1.15 hectares (2.84 acres). It is owned and managed by the Woodland Trust.
