= Folke =

Parish in Dorset, England

Coordinates: 50.9196°N 2.4864°W

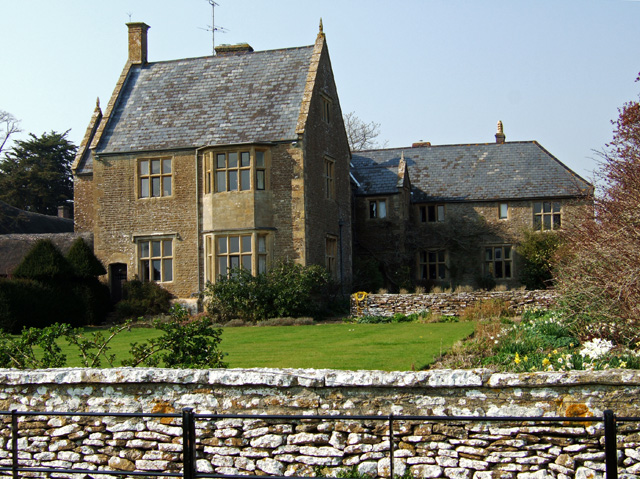
- Folke Manor House

- Location within Dorset
- Population: 270
- OS grid reference: ST660135
- Unitary authority: Dorset
- Ceremonial county: Dorset
- Region: South West
- Country: England
- Sovereign state: United Kingdom
- Post town: Sherborne
- Postcode district: DT9
- Police: Dorset
- Fire: Dorset and Wiltshire
- Ambulance: South Western
- UK Parliament: West Dorset

Folke is a parish in the county of Dorset in southern England, situated in the Blackmore Vale, approximately 3.5 miles (5.6 km) south-east of Sherborne. The parish has an area of 2,120 acres (8.6 km^{2}) and is made of the villages of Folke and Alweston, and the hamlet of Bishops Down.

Dorset County Council's 2013 estimate of the population of Folke parish is 270. In the 2011 census figures have been published for the population of Folke parish combined with the small parish of North Wootton to the north; this was 339.

The Manor House in the hamlet of Folke dates from about 1500 and adjoins the early 17th-century parish church. The house of Font le Roi, sited by the road towards Sturminster Newton, was built as a gatehouse in the 15th century. Folke Wood is nearby.
