= Heartwood Forest =

Woodland creation site in Hertfordshire, England

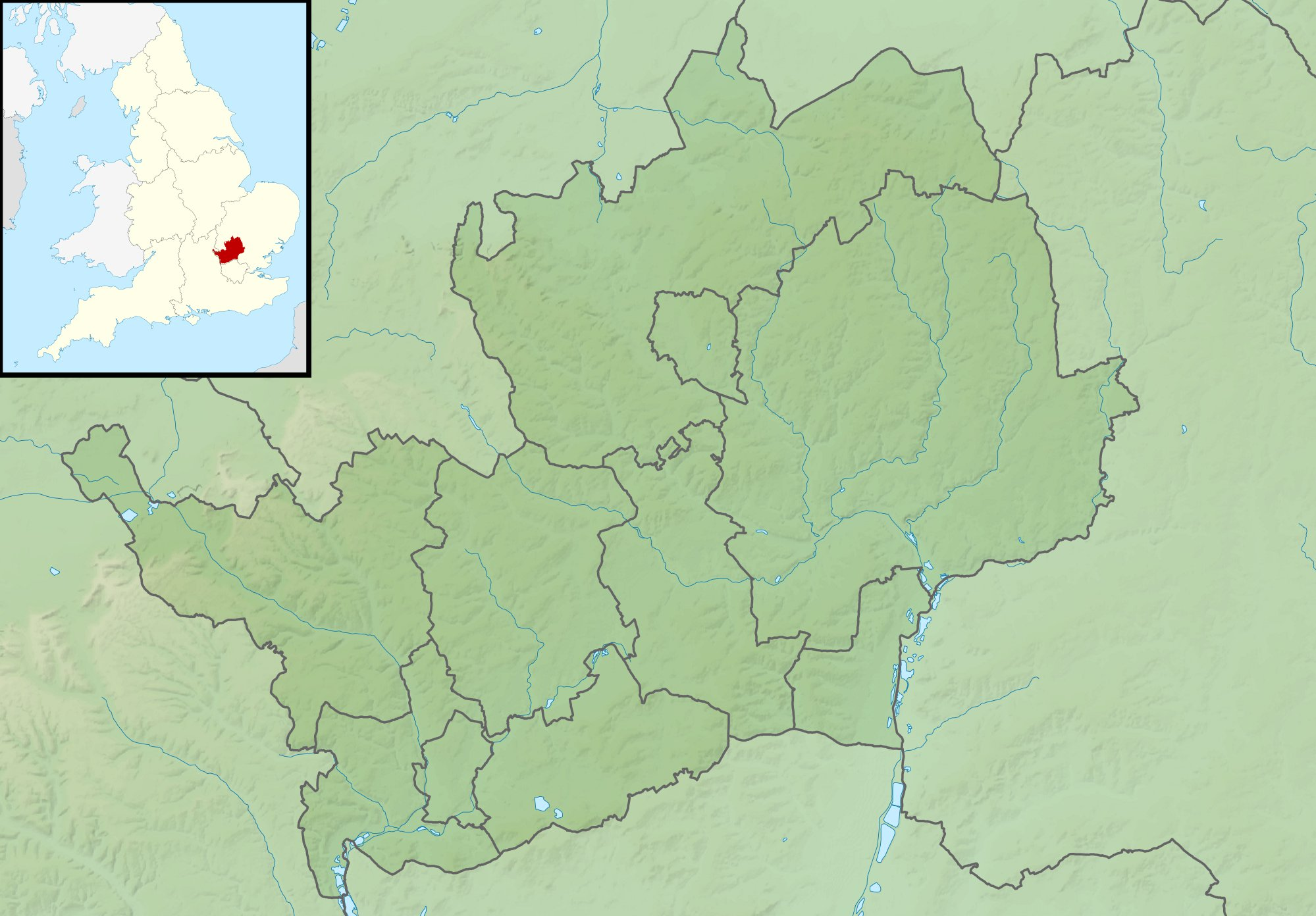
- Location within Hertfordshire
- Location: Sandridge, England
- Nearest city: St. Albans
- Coordinates: 51.7879°N 0.3196°W
- Governing body: Woodland Trust

Heartwood Forest is a planned forest (woodland creation site) in Hertfordshire, England. The site covers 347 hectares (860 acres), the largest continuous new native forest in England.

== Planting ==
Heartwood Forest is located near Sandridge, St Albans, in the Metropolitan Green Belt. When the Woodland Trust acquired the land in 2008, most of the area consisted of farmland, predominantly oilseed rape fields. Only 18 hectares (44 acres) of the site's total 347 hectares (860 acres) consisted of ancient woodland. The name "Heartwood" was chosen for the growing forest as a nod to the heart-shaped leaves of the rare Lime trees present in these original pockets of ancient woodland.

On 9 December 2009, a Guinness World Record attempt was made for the BBC Tree O'Clock scheme, in association with the Woodland Trust to plant the most new trees as possible in one hour. Three woodland sites made the attempt: the Heartwood Forest, Hainault Forest and Gransha Park. The previous record was 18,124 trees in an hour, held by the Forestry Commission at a site in Scotland. The Heartwood Forest site came second, with 20,326 trees planted, being beaten by Gransha Park where they planted over 26,000 trees in the hour.

The site officially opened on 25 March 2018. Over a period of ten years, roughly 45,000 volunteers, including 17,000 school children, planted a total of 600,000 trees.

== Forest ==
The original ancient forest in the area was mostly a bluebell wood. New plantings focused on native species like oak, hornbeam, birch, and willow trees. A community orchard of more than 600 fruit trees similarly focuses on old Hertfortshire varieties, including apple, pear and cherry trees. There is also an arboretum with representatives of all 57 native British tree species, the only such collection in the UK.

In addition to trees, the site contains open grassland and wildflower meadows.

== Wildlife ==
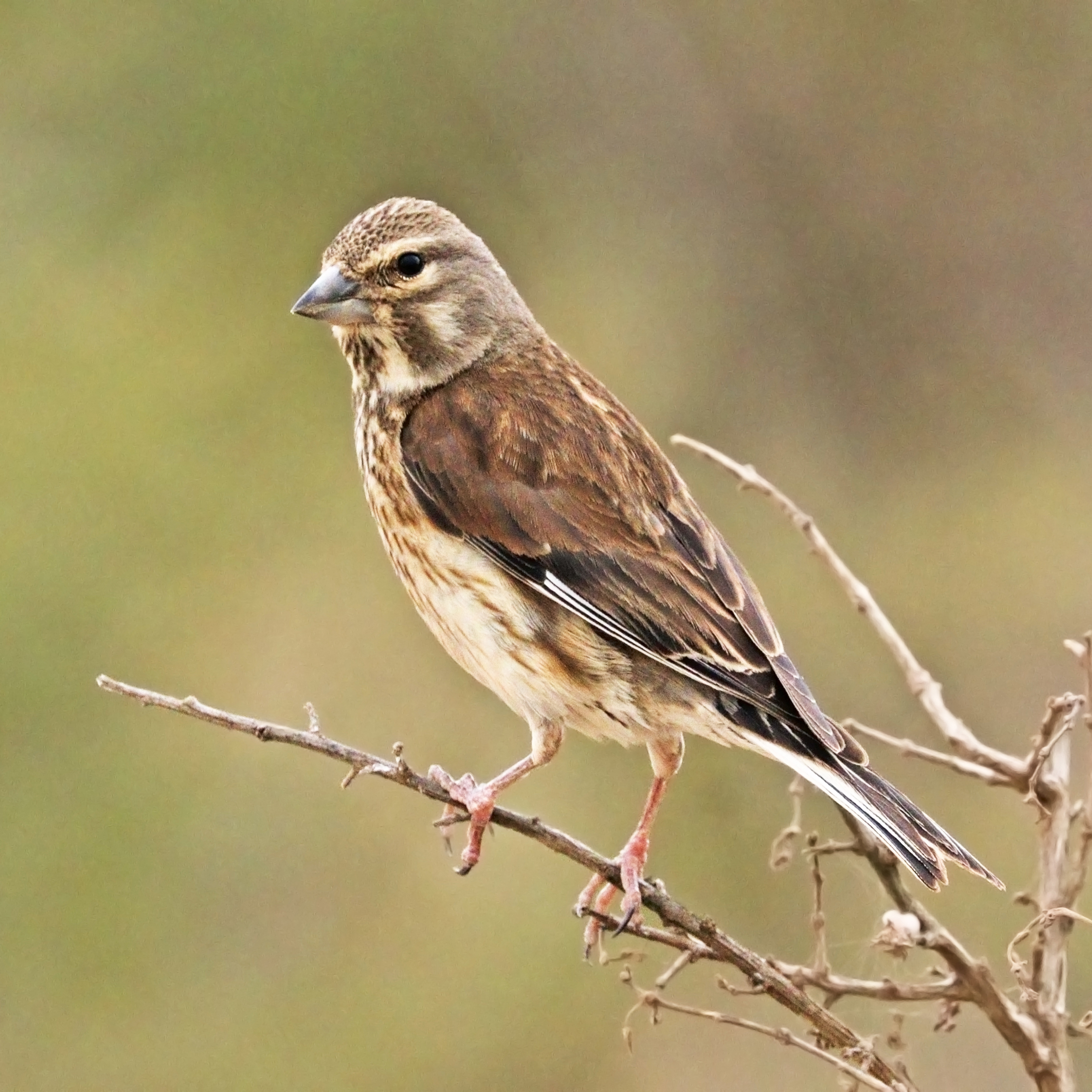
Linnet sightings more than doubled in the area

Part of the motivation for the forest planting was to improve biodiversity. The Woodland Trust monitors local wildlife, and found that many species' populations more than doubled between 2010 and 2016, as the forest expanded substantially. Short-eared owls and barn owls returned for the area for the first time in a decade, and several entirely new species were attracted. As of 2017, the trust had recorded 87 different bird species, 62 small mammal species, and 27 butterfly species.

== Tourism ==
The forest is open to the public free of charge, with marked trails and walking paths throughout. There are also routes to allow riding bicycles or horses. As of 2019, the forest attracted roughly 140,000 visitors a year.
