= Folke Wood =

Woodland in Dorset, England

- Location within Dorset
- Interactive map of Folke Wood

Geography
- Location: Dorset, England
- OS grid: ST657134
- Coordinates: 50.9195°N 2.4888°W

Folke Wood is a wood near Folke in Dorset, England. It was planted by the Woodland Trust in 1985. It consists of native broadleaved trees as well as apple and ash trees. The apple trees are the remains of an orchard which existed in the 19th century.
