= Whittaker Wood =

- Location within Greater Manchester
- Interactive map of Whittaker Wood

Geography
- Location: Greater Manchester, England
- OS grid: SD946154
- Coordinates: 53.635°N 2.082°W
- Area: 1.88 hectares (4.65 acres)

Administration
- Authority: Woodland Trust

Whittaker Wood is a woodland in Greater Manchester, England, near Littleborough. It covers a total area of 1.88 hectares (4.65 acres). It is owned and managed by the Woodland Trust.
