= Christine Charlesworth =

English sculptor

Christine Charlesworth FRSA
- Born: Wolverhampton, West Midlands, UK
- Education: Wolverhampton College of Arts
- Known for: Sculpture
- Website: www.christinecharlesworth.co.uk

Christine Charlesworth (born 1949) is an English sculptor. She has undertaken many private and public commissions, with some of her works standing in locations in England.

== Life ==
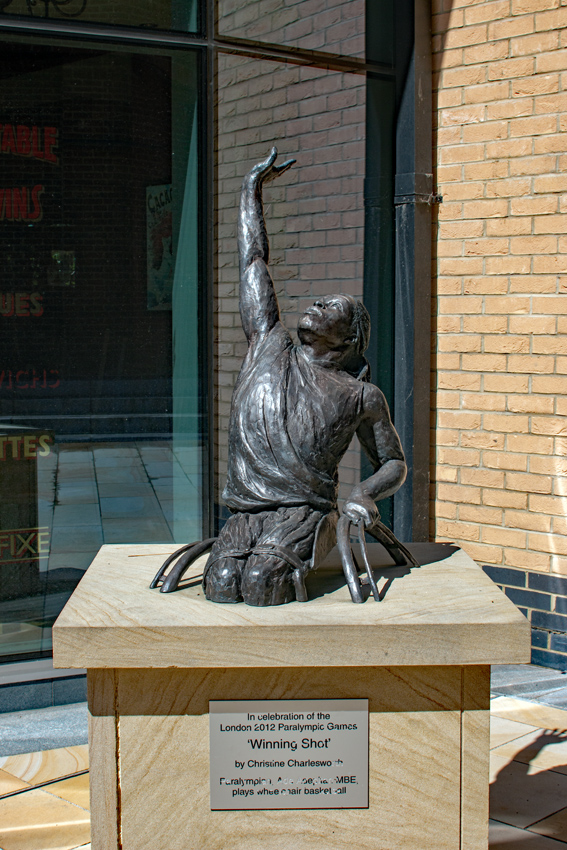
"Winning Shot": statue of Ade Adepitan in Woking

Born Christine Fullwood in Wolverhampton, Charlesworth studied at the Wolverhampton College of Art from 1966 to 1969. She was elected a member of the Society of Women Artists in 2007, and was elected a member in 2008 of the Royal Society of Sculptors. She is a Fellow of the Royal Society of Arts.

== Works ==
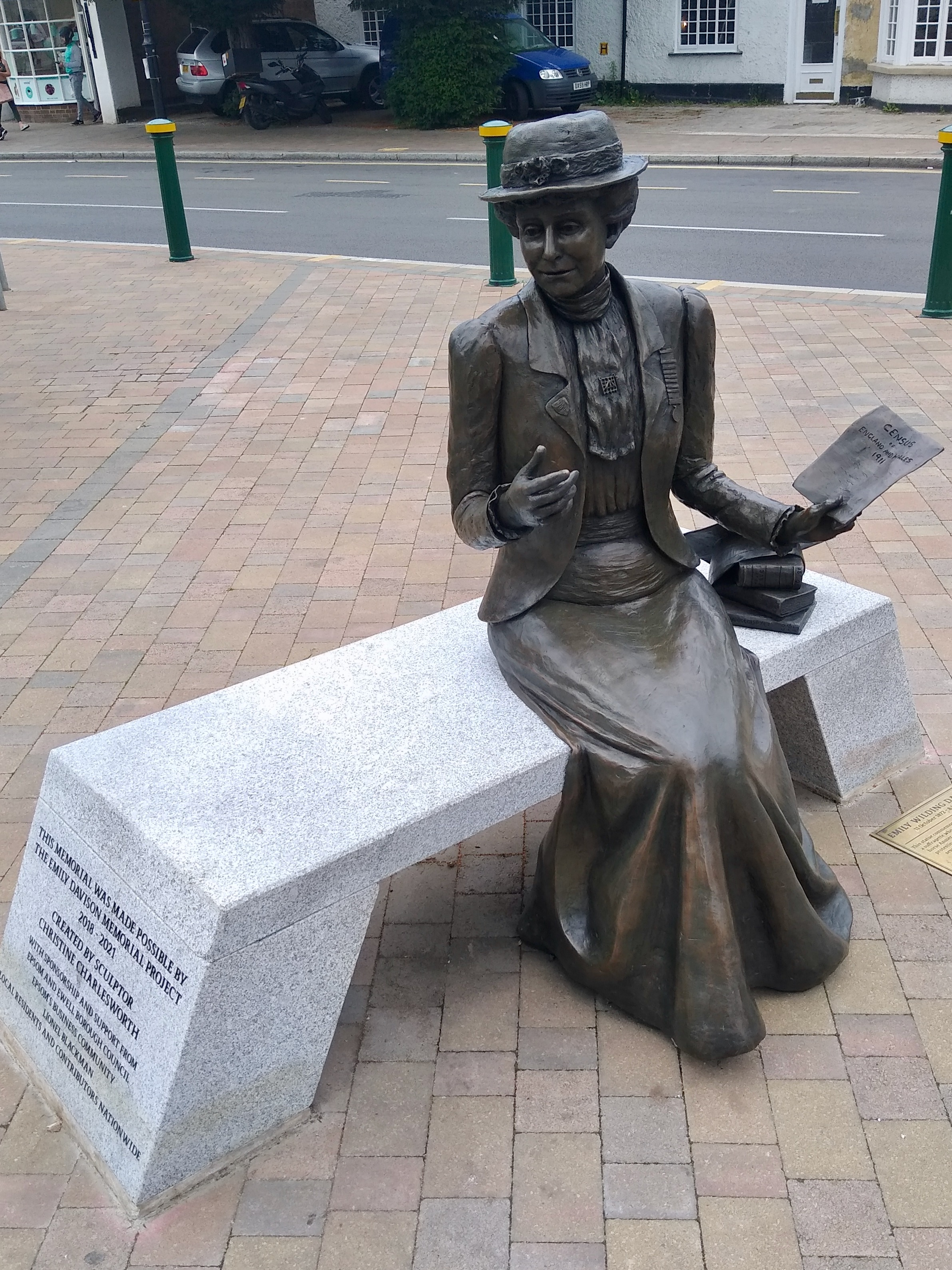
Statue of Emily Davison, in Epsom

For figurative sculptures, Charlesworth works in clay, from which bronze or resin figures are cast, in limited editions or for commissions. She also works in steel to create laser cut-outs for installations. Her works include the following:

"Seeds of Hope", of 2008, was commissioned by the Seeds of Hope Children's Garden Project. Bronze statues of two children playing are in the grounds of Guildford Cathedral, Surrey.

"Winning Shot" is a bronze statue of the television presenter and wheelchair basketball player Ade Adepitan, in Jubilee Square in Woking, Surrey. The statue, one of an edition of five made in celebration of the 2012 Summer Paralympics, was purchased by Woking Borough Council, and it was unveiled on 3 November 2012.

"Sailor", of 2016, is in Langley Vale Wood, a "Centenary Wood" in Langley Vale, near Epsom, Surrey. It was commissioned for the Woodland Trust Centenary Woods Project, as part of the First World War centenary commemorations. Jutland Wood, within Langley Vale Wood, commemorates the Battle of Jutland of 1916. Made of corten steel, "Sailor" is a silhouette, of a sailor of 1916 on one side, facing the ancient woodland, and a sailor of 2016 on the other, facing newly planted trees.

In High Street Epsom, Surrey, there is a bronze statue of the suffragette Emily Wilding Davison, sitting on a granite bench. It was commissioned by the Emily Davison Memorial Project, and it was unveiled on 8 June 2021, the 108th anniversary of Davison's death.
