= Furzehill Plantation =

Woodland in Devon, England

- Location within Devon
- Interactive map of Furzehill Plantation

Geography
- Location: Devon, England
- OS grid: SY323925
- Coordinates: 50.728°N 2.959°W
- Area: 1.22 hectares (3.01 acres)

Administration
- Authority: Woodland Trust

Furzehill Plantation is a woodland in Devon, England, near the village of Uplyme. It covers a total area of 1.22 hectares (3.01 acres). It is owned and managed by the Woodland Trust.
