= Langley Vale Wood =

Woodland in Surrey, England

Coordinates: 51.295°N 0.259°W

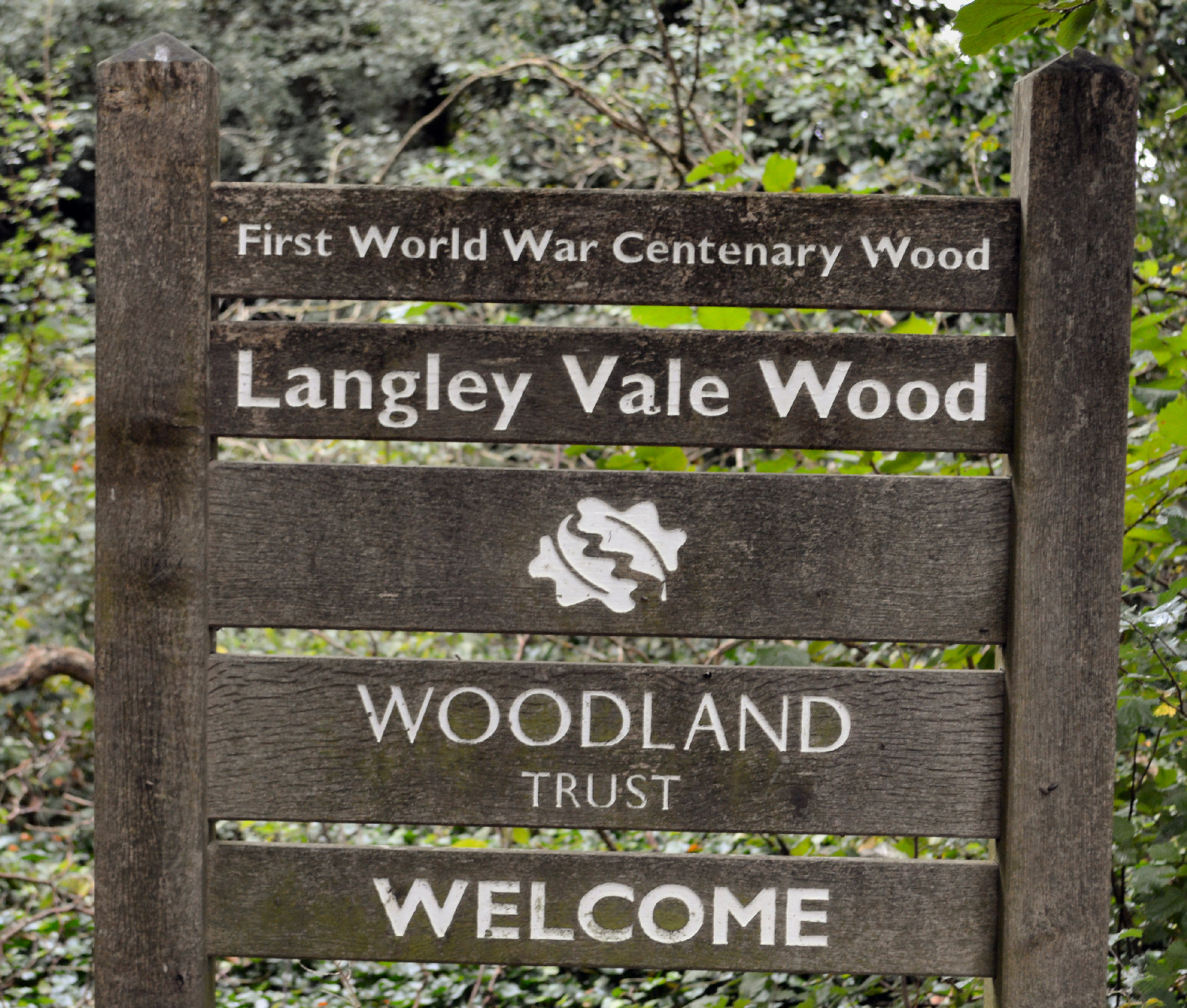

Langley Vale Wood is one of four First World War centenary woods created by the Woodland Trust. It is located in Langley Vale, near Epsom, on the North Downs. The site covers 641 acres, including 120 acres of ancient woodland and areas of open downland. Access is via public rights of way, and a charge applies to parking in the site's car park.

During the First World War, parts of the site near Walton-on-the-Hill and Tadworth were used for army training. Some 8,000 troops were billeted at Tadworth Camp, while nearby Round Wood was used for gas training. Woodcote Park Convalescent Camp was also located nearby.

The Woodland Trust purchased the site in 2014 and has since planted approximately 180,000 trees. Langley Vale Wood was formally opened on 24 June 2015 by the Princess Royal.

The Woodland Trust has commissioned several commemorative installations around the site.

The Regiment of Trees consists of twelve figures carved from Hill House Edge sandstone by Patrick Walls. They represent some of the 20,000 volunteers of the 2nd London Division inspected by Lord Kitchener on Epsom Downs in January 1915. Some figures wear military uniforms and carry rifles, while others are dressed in civilian clothes, reflecting a shortage of uniforms and the availability of only 100 rifles. The inspection took place during a blizzard. Witness is a sculpture created by John Merrill between 2016 and 2020 from 35 large pieces of oak, inspired by the paintings of Paul Nash. The sculpture incorporates excerpts from seven poems written during the war: 'Afterwards' by Margaret Cole, 'May, 1915' by Charlotte Mew, 'The Gift of India' by Sarojini Naidu, 'Futility' by Wilfred Owen, 'Matthew Copse' by Will Streets, 'Lights Out' by Edward Thomas and 'Grodek' by Georg Trakl. Jutland Wood commemorates the 6,097 sailors who died at the Battle of Jutland. It comprises an avenue of 14 oak markers shaped like portholes, one for each British warship sunk in the battle, recording the number of crew members killed. The markers were created by Andrew Lapthorn. At one end of the avenue, a boat-shaped area with benches contains a steel sculpture of a sailor by Christine Charlesworth. On the side facing the ancient woodland, the sailor wears a First World War uniform; on the opposite side, facing the newly planted trees, the figure wears a modern uniform. A sapling was planted for each sailor killed, and the groves are named after recipients of the Victoria Cross for their actions during the battle.

Other features include the Sainsbury's Community Orchard, with picnic tables; the Poppy play area; the Verdun Oaks, grown from acorns descended from those collected on the battlefield of Verdun; Cherry Avenue, where trees bear boards recounting the stories of local soldiers; a carved soldier's bench; and a memorial seat commemorating HMS Paragon.

The chargeable car park on Headley Road opened in May 2023. A visitor centre has also been proposed for the site.

== Gallery ==
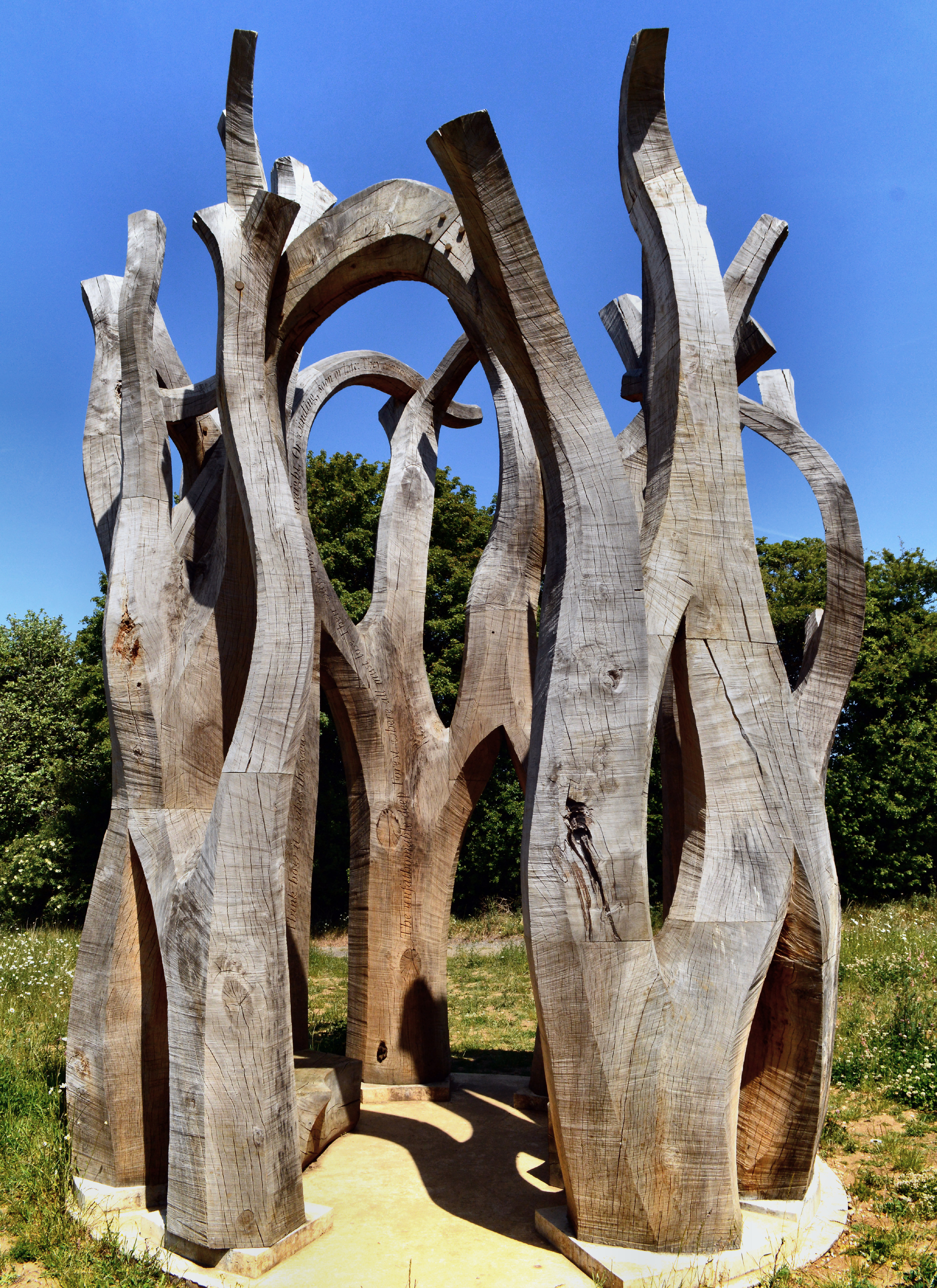
Witness

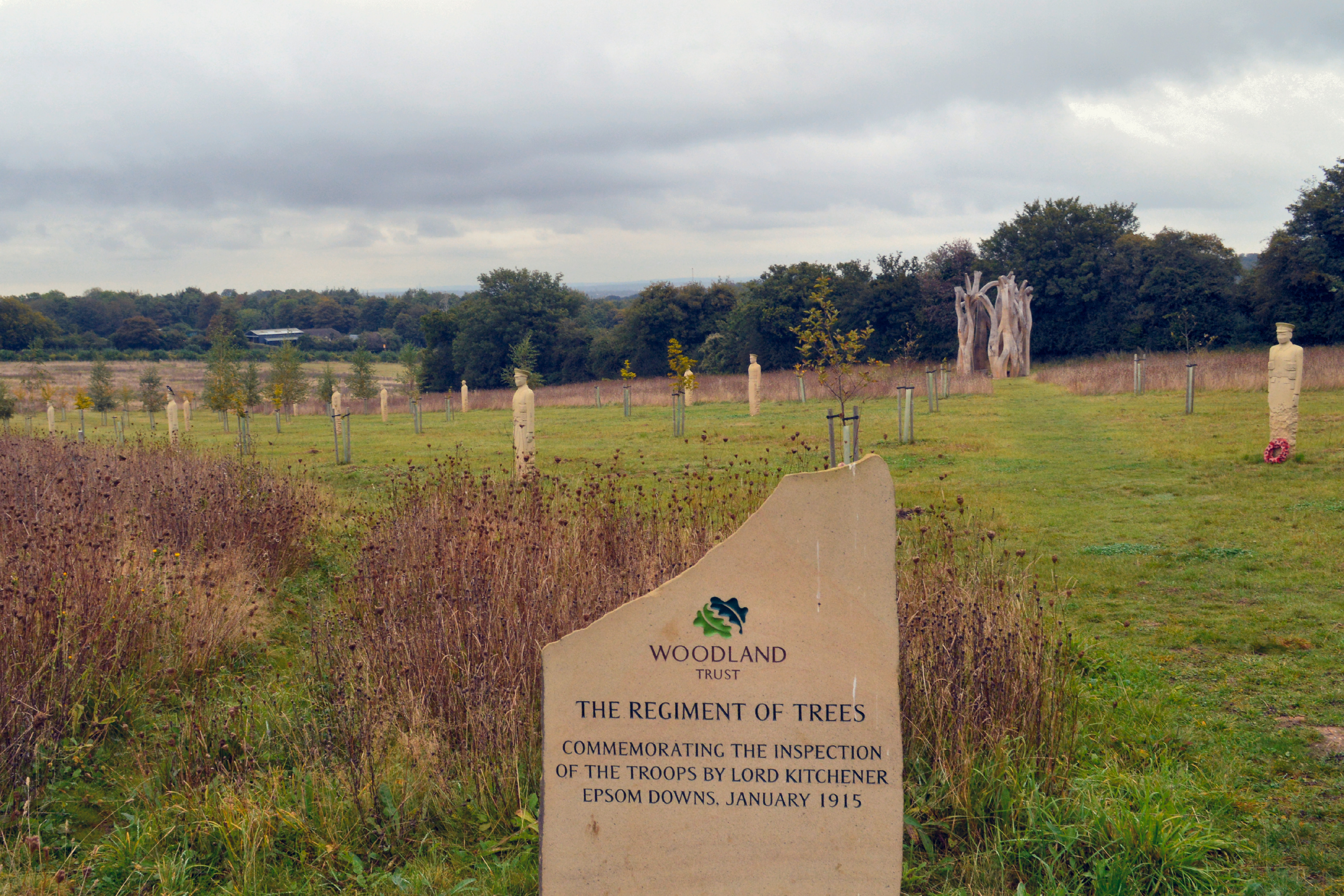
The Regiment of Trees

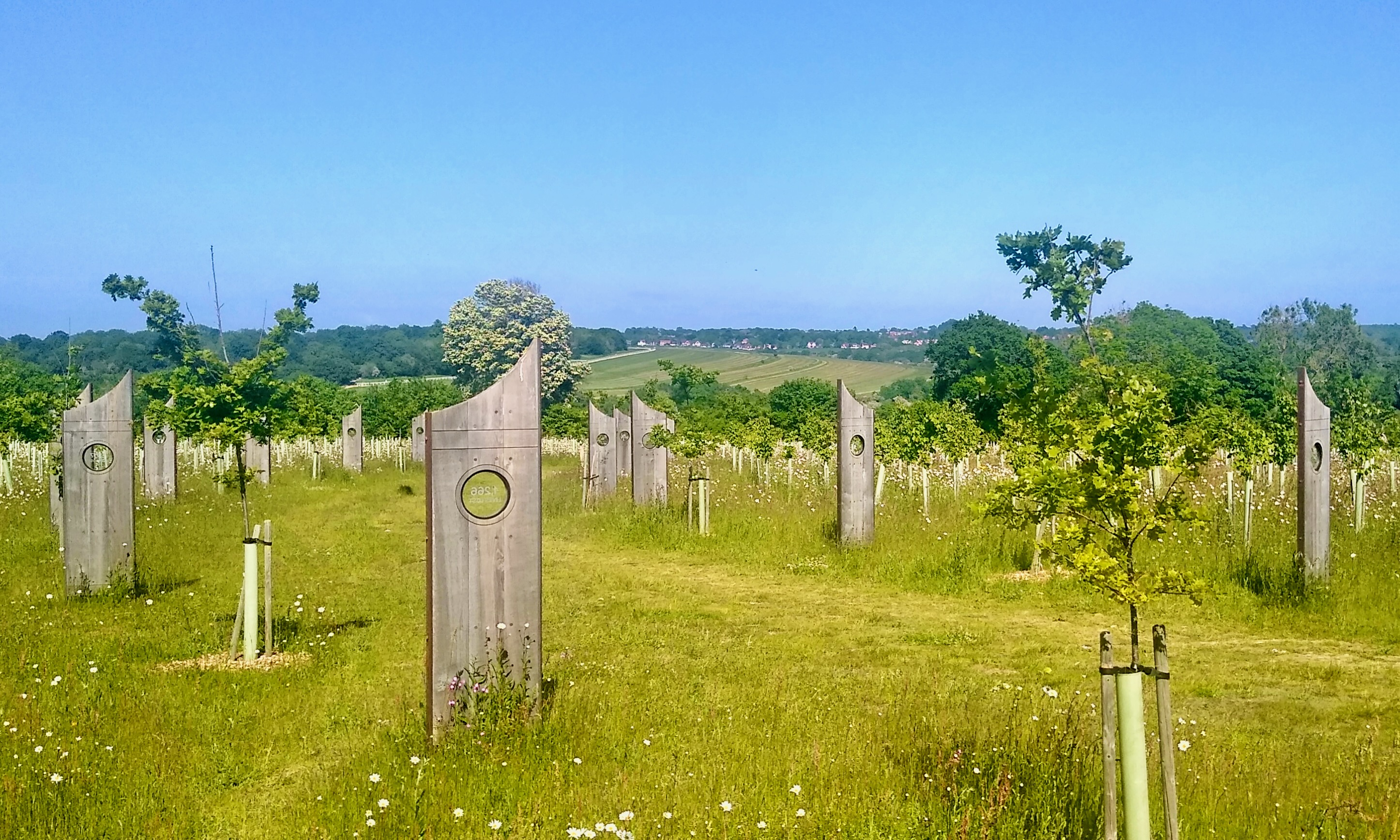
Jutland Wood avenue

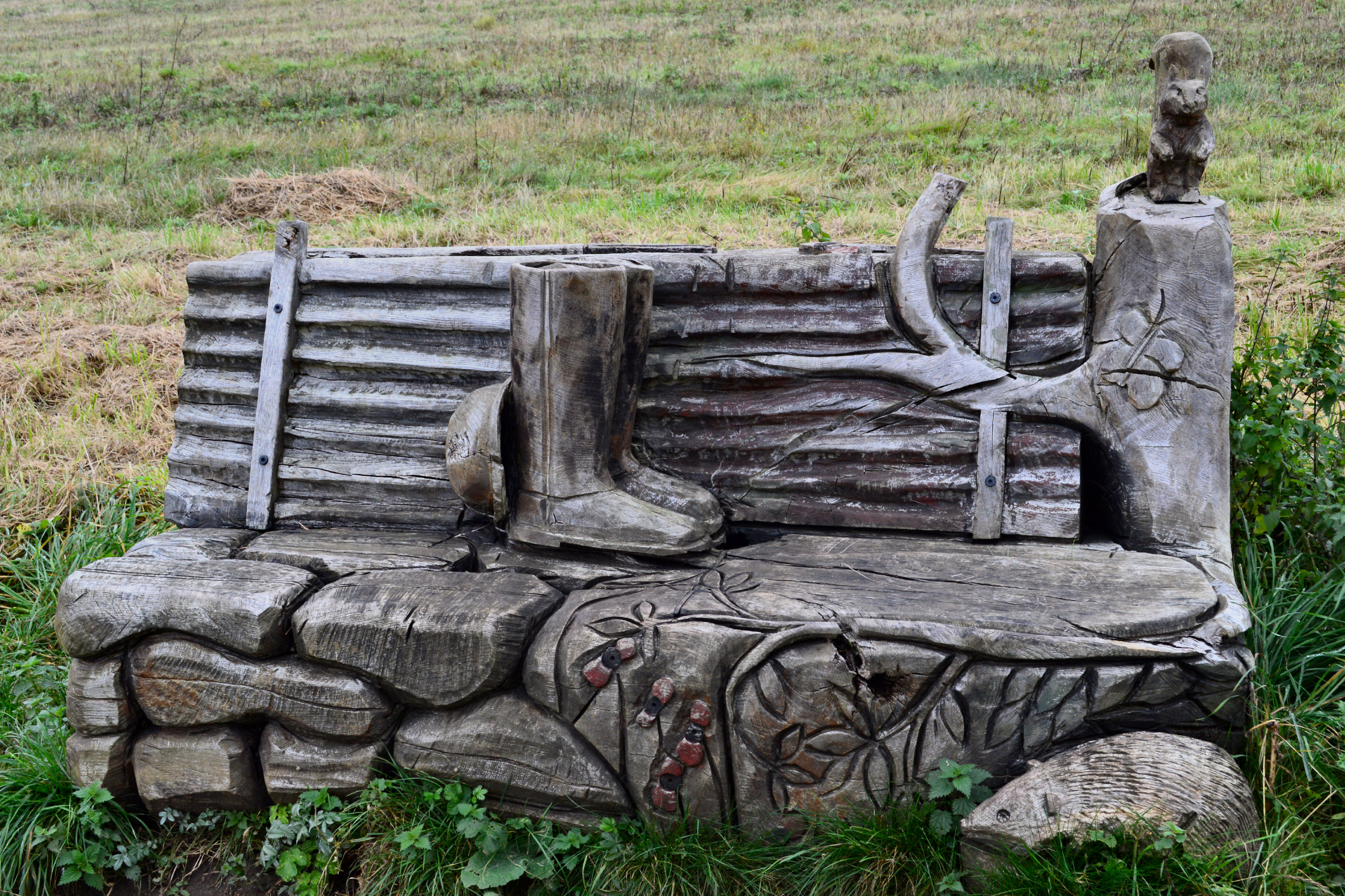
The Soldier's Bench

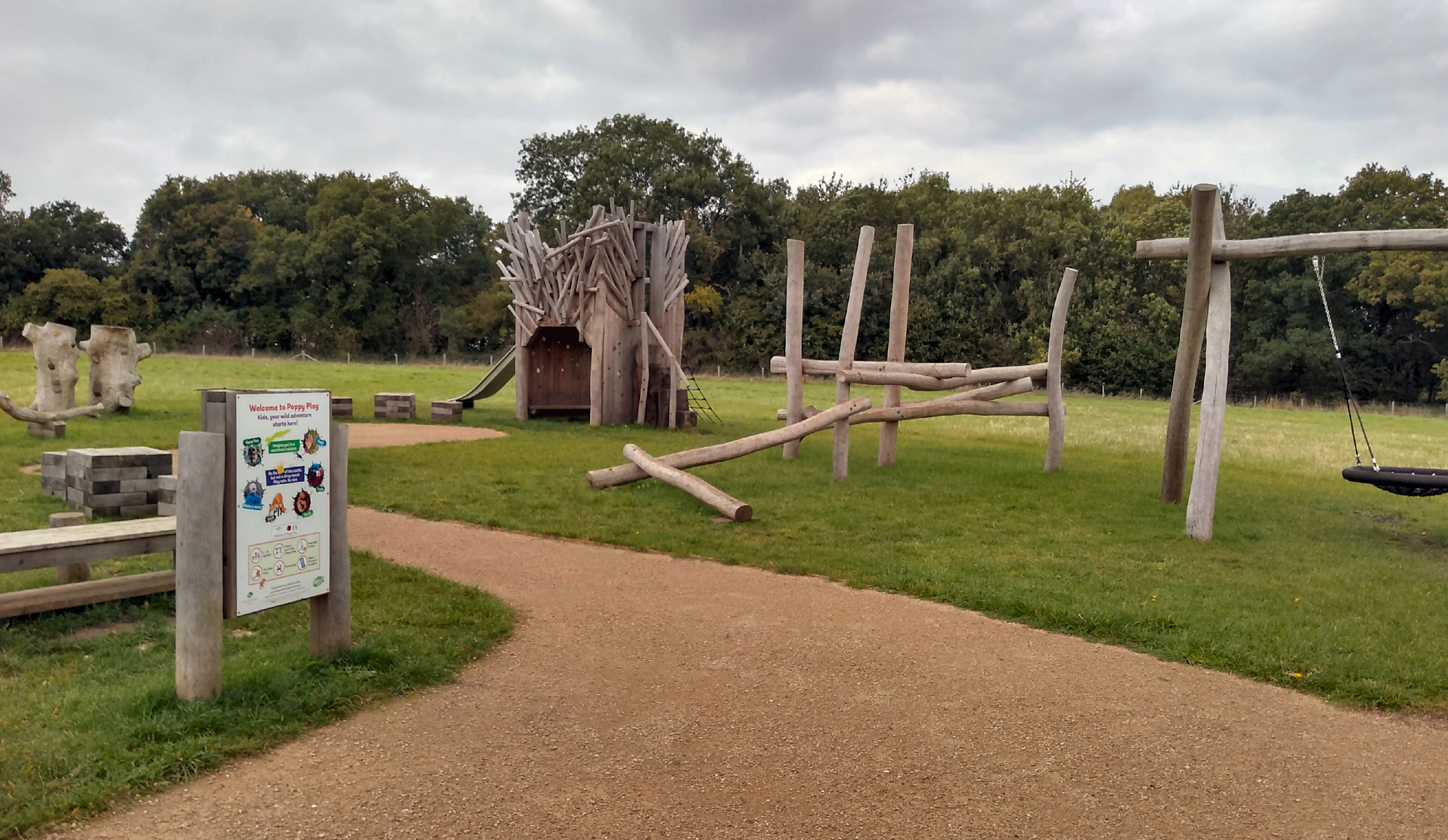
Play Area
