= Glen Finglas Estate =

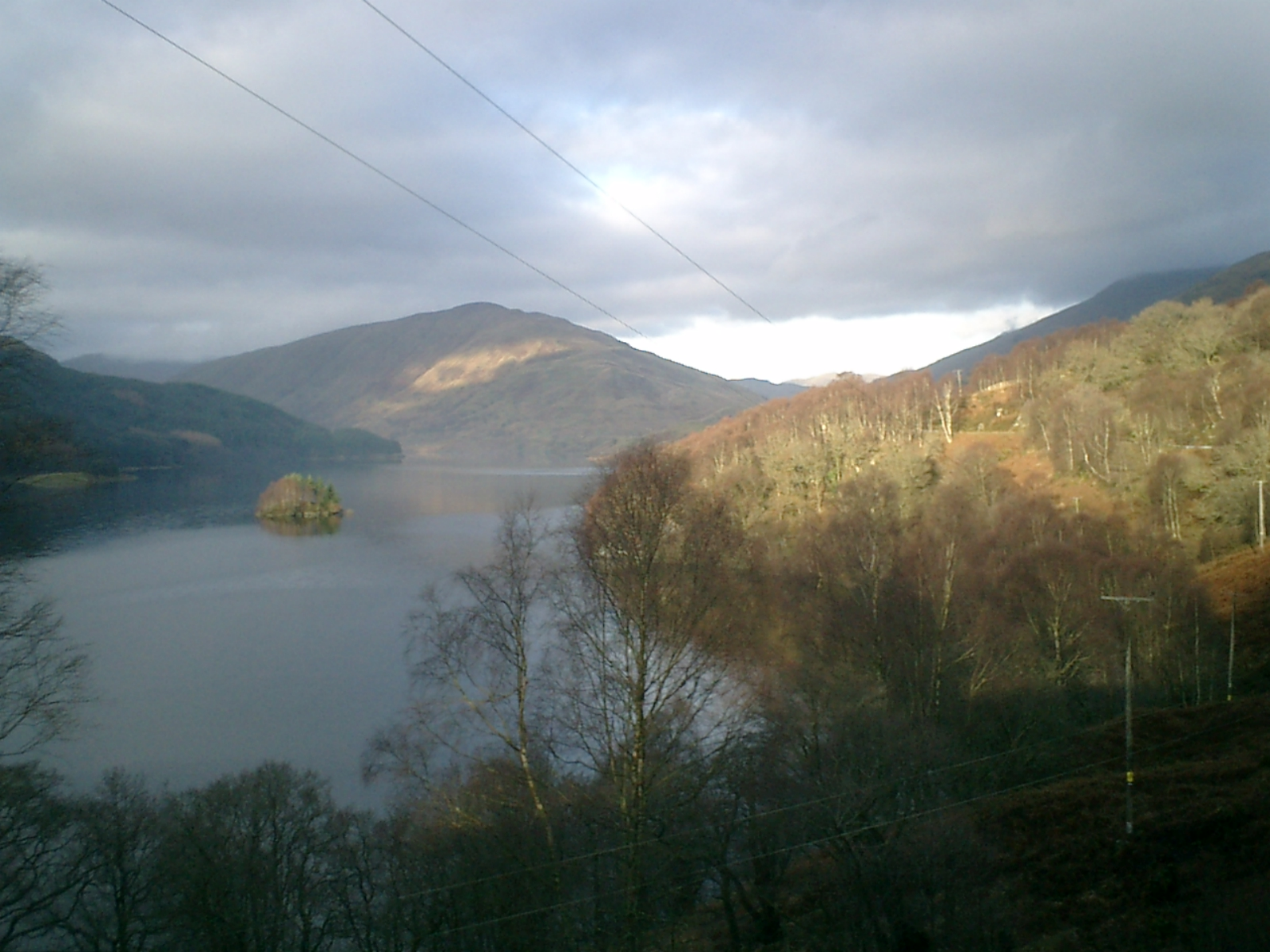
- Glen Finglas with reservoir in the foreground

- Location within Stirling
- Interactive map of Glen Finglas Estate

Geography
- Location: Stirling, Scotland
- OS grid: NN504109
- Coordinates: 56.267°N 4.417°W
- Area: 10,000 acres (4,000 ha)

Administration
- Authority: Woodland Trust

The Glen Finglas Estate is a property in Glen Finglas in the Trossachs, Scotland managed by The Woodland Trust. The estate extends for over 10,000 acres (4,000 ha), most of which was once covered in woodland. The closest towns are Aberfoyle and Callander.

The Woodland Trust has restored ancient woodland and created the Great Trossachs Path, one of Scotland's Great Trails, across the estate.

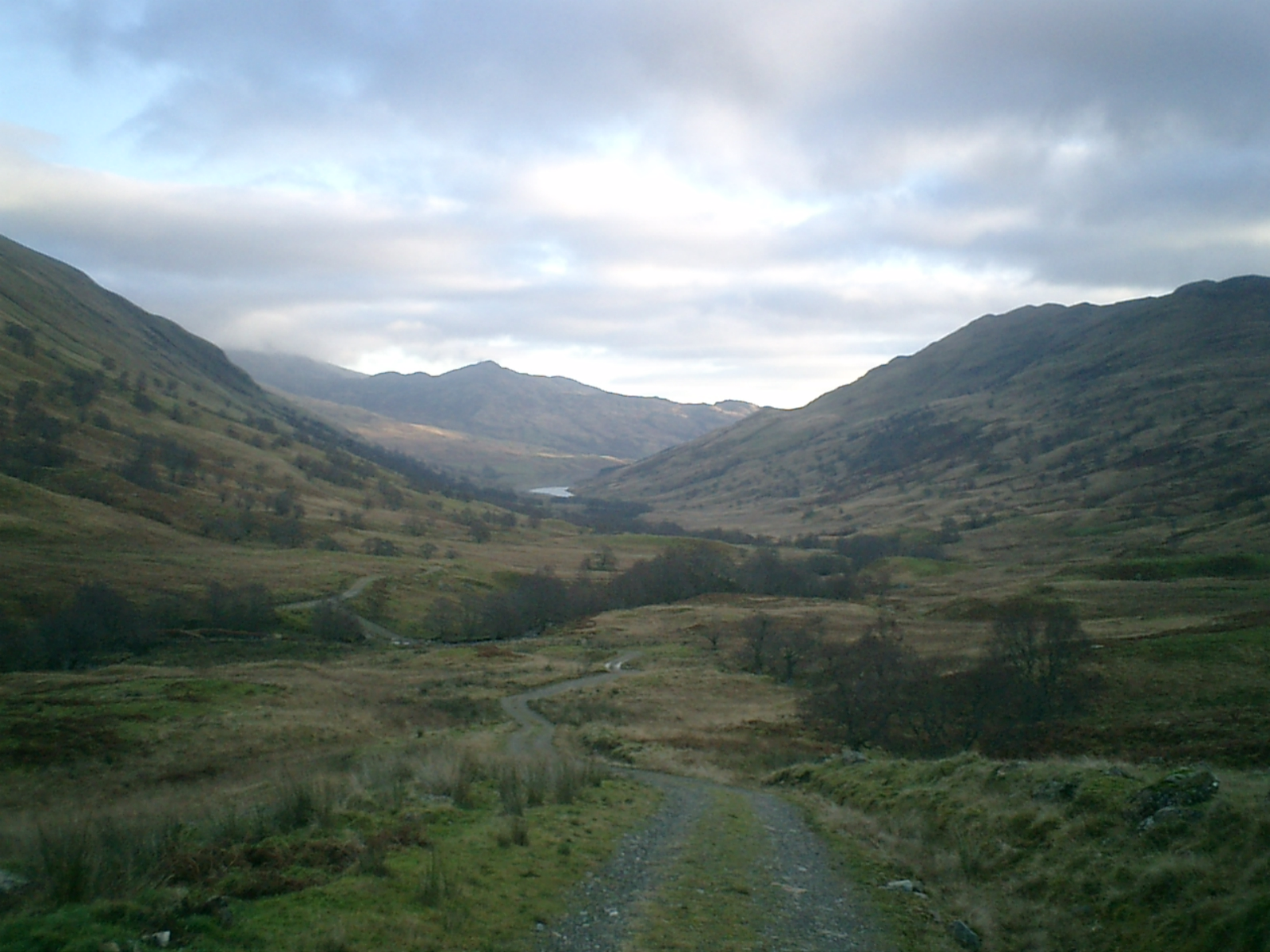
Glen Finglas.
