= Oldmoor Wood =

- Location within Nottinghamshire
- Interactive map of Oldmoor Wood

Geography
- Location: Nottinghamshire, England
- OS grid: SK497419
- Coordinates: 52.972°N 1.260°W
- Area: 15.11 hectares (37.34 acres)

Administration
- Authority: Woodland Trust

Oldmoor Wood is a woodland in Nottinghamshire, England, near the village of Strelley. It covers a total area of 15.11 hectares (37.34 acres). It is owned and managed by the Woodland Trust. During early spring, Oldmoor Woods is blanketed in a carpet of English and Spanish bluebells.
