= Philipshill Wood =

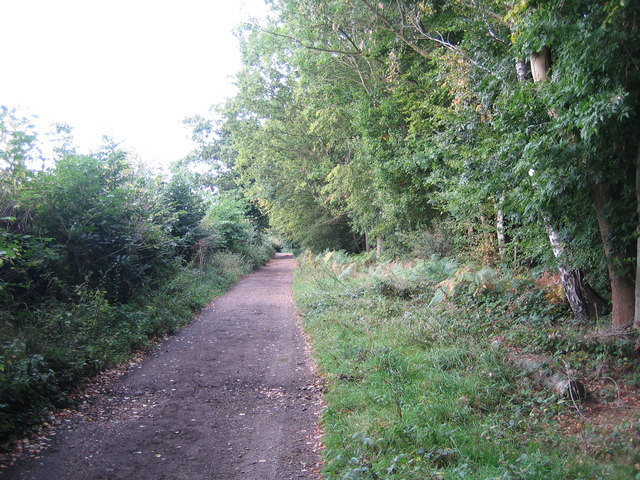
- Old Shire Lane, with the wood to the right

- Location within Buckinghamshire
- Interactive map of Philipshill Wood

Geography
- Location: Buckinghamshire, England
- OS grid: TQ010947
- Coordinates: 51.641°N 0.540°W
- Area: 77 acres (31 ha)

Administration
- Authority: Woodland Trust

Philipshill Wood is a 77-acre (31 ha) area of woodland in the English county of Buckinghamshire, situated on the border with Hertfordshire about 1 mile (1.6 km) from the village of Chorleywood. It is within the Chiltern Hills Area of Outstanding Natural Beauty, and is owned by the Woodland Trust. The wood is fully open to the public, with some parking available in Old Shire Lane, to the east of the wood.

== History ==
Philipshill Wood is an ancient woodland, although it has been cleared and replanted several times during its history. Historic human management of the wood is evidenced by archaeological features such as earthworks and the remains of sawpits, chalk pits and a charcoal hearth. Old Shire Lane on the eastern edge of the wood is thought to mark part of the boundary between the Anglo-Saxon kingdoms of Wessex and Mercia.

Timber from the wood was formerly used by furniture makers in High Wycombe and, during the Second World War, to make rifle butts. The wood was cleared towards the end of the 1960s and planted with beech and conifer trees. In 1994, it came under the ownership and management of the Woodland Trust.

In 2008, the Woodland Trust awarded local resident Janet Anders their "Volunteer of the Year Award" for her work in organising weekly volunteer work parties in the wood.

== Flora and fauna ==
The wood is predominantly beech. There are also a number of conifer species, such as Scots pine, Douglas fir and western hemlock; these were planted during the 1960s but are being removed by the Woodland Trust as part of a long-term management plan. In addition to beech and conifer, the wood is home to some cherry, rowan, hornbeam, field maple and oak trees.

The wood is particularly known for its bluebells during April and May. Its flora also includes wood anemone, wood sorrel and several species of orchid, including bird's-nest orchids and white helleborine. It is home to tawny owls.
