= Backmuir Wood =

Woodland in Angus, Scotland

- Location within Angus
- Interactive map of Backmuir Wood

Geography
- Location: Angus, Scotland
- OS grid: NO340340
- Coordinates: 56.496°N 3.075°W
- Area: 140.58 acres (56.89 ha)

Administration
- Authority: Woodland Trust

Backmuir Wood is a 140.58 acres (56.89 ha) woodland in the Scottish county of Angus, about 4 kilometres (2 mi) northwest of Dundee. It is located south of the A923, between the villages of Muirhead and Liff. Since 1996, the woodland has been under the ownership of the Woodland Trust, which manages it in partnership with a local community group. The area of the wood has been extended since then, including the acquisition of a further 17 acres (7 hectares) in 2009. Backmuir Wood is a diverse woodland, which is home to a variety of different tree species. It also provides a habitat for the red squirrel, a protected species in the UK.

== History ==
Backmuir Wood is an ancient woodland, which was acquired by the Woodland Trust in 1996, with financial assistance from a number of sources including Scottish Natural Heritage and the Heritage Lottery Fund. At the time of acquisition, the area of the wood was 111 acres (45 hectares), but it has been extended while under the ownership of the Trust. In 2000, the Trust used funding from Homebase to purchase an adjacent 4-acre (1.6-hectare) field to extend the wood, as part of the "Woodlands for the Millennium" scheme in celebration of the 2000 millennium. The planting of over 8000 trees on the site began the following year, and this plantation became known as Millennium Corner. A commemorative feature, consisting of standing stones within a ring of copper beech trees, was also placed in the wood. In 2009, following a fundraising appeal, the Trust was able to extend Backmuir Wood by another 17 acres (7 hectares).

== Management and access ==
Backmuir Wood is owned and managed by the Woodland Trust, in collaboration with a local Backmuir Woodland Community Group. Like all other Woodland Trust woodlands, it is open to the public. There are approximately 9 kilometres (6 mi) of trail in the wood, with four major access points for walkers. The wood is popular with local residents, especially for dog walking. The Woodland Trust estimate that there are 11,000 visitors to the wood each year.

== Flora and fauna ==
Backmuir Wood is a diverse woodland, containing a variety of species of tree, including oak, beech, sycamore, alder, Scots pine and rowan. Overall, around 20% of the wood is conifers, 70% broadleaves and 10% open space. Different species predominate in certain parts of the wood, with many beech trees in the south, birches in the centre, conifers in the north east, and oaks and rowans in the north west. The oldest trees in the wood are oak and beech; one of the beech trees in the wood is believed to date to the 19th century.

The wood provides a habitat for red squirrels, a protected species in the UK. The squirrels can be found in Scots pine trees. Sightings of buzzards and kestrels are common in the area.
