= River Grom =

River in Kent and East Sussex, England

Coordinates: 51°07′05″N 0°09′30″E

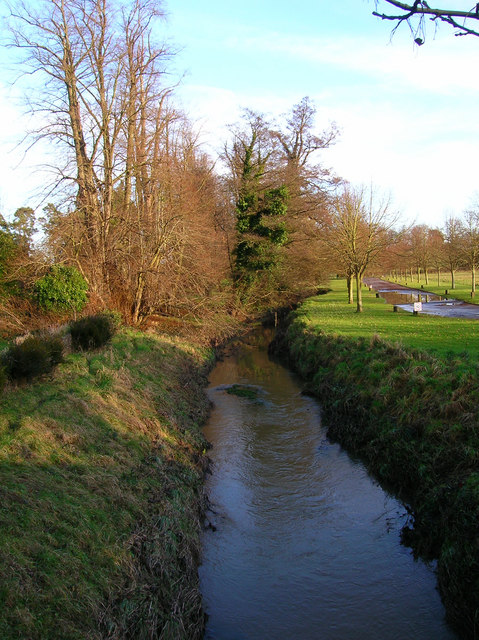
The River Grom by the entrance to Groombridge Place.

The River Grom is a short tributary of the River Medway near Tunbridge Wells in south-east England. Flowing westwards through High Rocks and Groombridge, it forms the Kent-East Sussex border for part of its length. A diversion of the Grom feeds the moat at Groombridge Place.
