= Furze Hill SSSI =

Protected area in Cambridgeshire, England

Coordinates: 52.114°N 0.267°E

Furze Hill
- Site of Special Scientific Interest
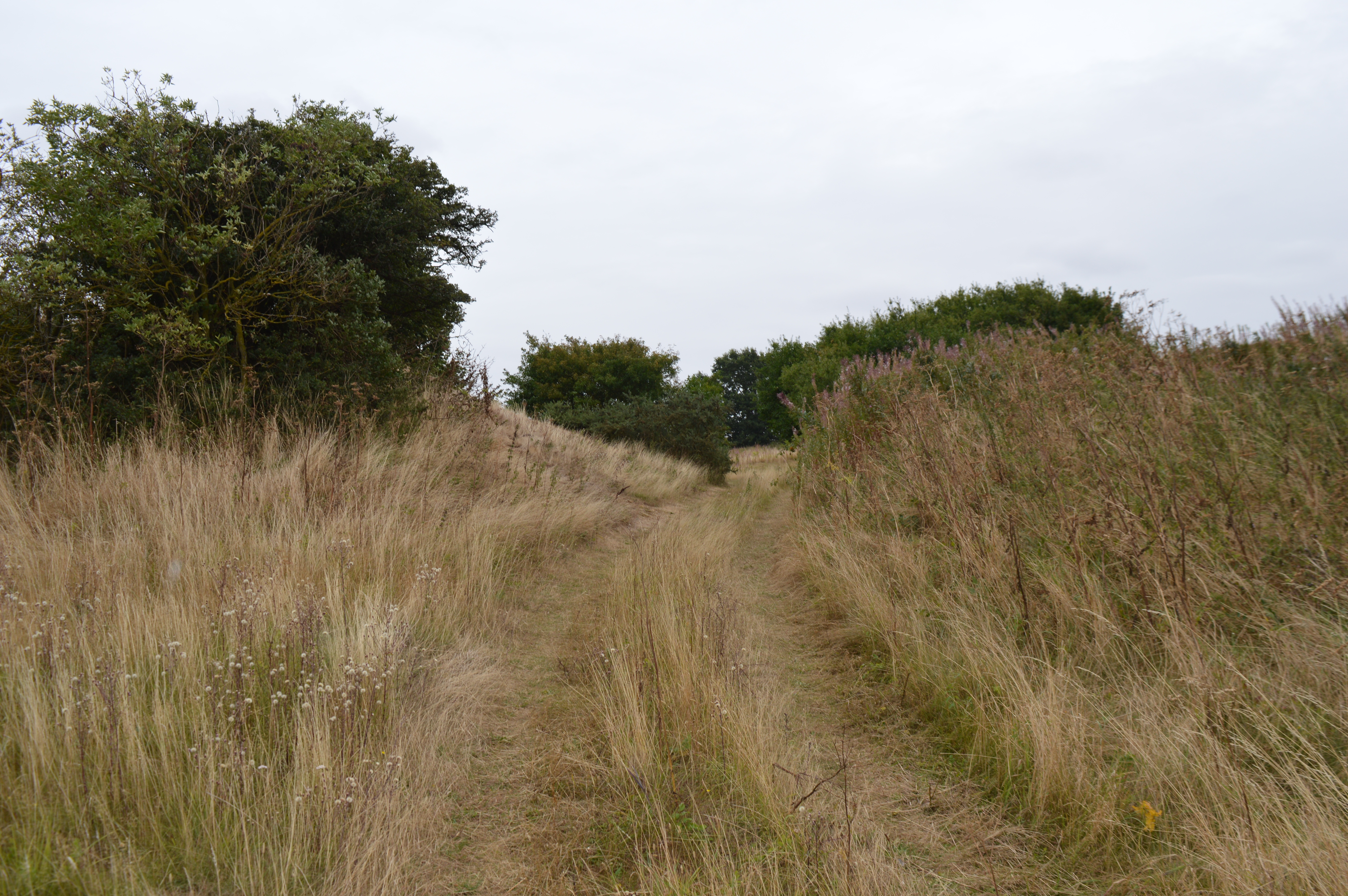
- Location of Furze Hill.
- Area of search: Cambridgeshire
- Grid reference: TL 553 486
- Interest: Biological
- Area: 5.8 hectares
- Notification date: 1985
- Location map: Magic Map

Furze Hill is a 5.8-hectare (14-acre) biological Site of Special Scientific Interest in three nearby areas east of Hildersham in Cambridgeshire.

The site has steep banks of glacial deep sandy gravel, and is one of the few examples of a sandy habitat in the county. There are several rare plants, such as hoary cinquefoils, pasque flowers and maiden pinks.

The site is private land with no public access.
