= Furzehill, Devon =

Hamlet in Devon, England

Coordinates: 51.200000°N 3.816666°W

Furzehill
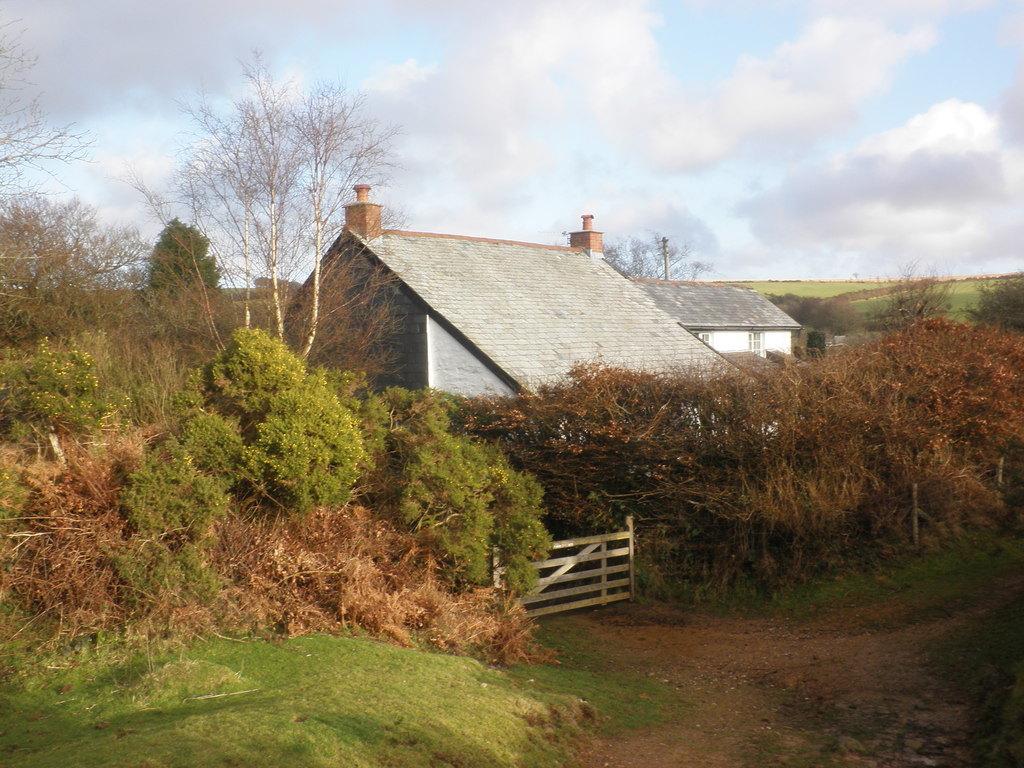
- Furzehill

- Location within Devon
- OS grid reference: SS7317146101
- District: North Devon
- Ceremonial county: Devon
- Region: South West
- Country: England
- Sovereign state: United Kingdom
- Post town: LYNTON
- Postcode district: EX35 6L
- Police: Devon and Cornwall
- Fire: Devon and Somerset
- Ambulance: South Western

Furzehill is a hamlet in the North Devon district of Devon, England. Its nearest town is Lynton, which lies approximately 4 miles (6.4 km) north from the hamlet. The hamlet is situated in the Exmoor National Park, near the Devon-Somerset border.
