= Furzehill Wood =

Woodland in Dorset, England

- Location within Dorset
- Interactive map of Furzehill Wood

Geography
- Location: Dorset, England
- OS grid: SU012018
- Coordinates: 50.816°N 1.983°W
- Area: 0.84 hectares (2.08 acres)

Administration
- Authority: Woodland Trust

Furzehill Wood is a woodland near Colehill in Dorset, England. It covers a total area of 0.84 hectares (2.08 acres). It is owned and managed by the Woodland Trust. In the past the site was known as Furze Hill. In 1982 the land was given to the Woodland Trust by a neighbouring landowner. Until recently the area was sparsely wooded, but after some replanting, mature oak and ash trees now grow here, together with cherry, hazel, black poplar, and conifers. The name Furzehill refers to the gorse (once known as 'furze') that used to cover the local area.
