= Woodland Trust =

Woodland conservation charity in the UK

- Formation: 1972
- Legal status: Non-profit company and registered charity
- Purpose: Woodland conservation
- Location: Kempton Way, Grantham, Lincolnshire, England, NG31 6LL
- Region served: UK
- Members: 300,000
- Chief Executive: Darren Moorcroft
- Main organ: Board of Trustees
- Budget: £82.5 million
- Website: www.woodlandtrust.org.uk

The Woodland Trust is the largest woodland conservation charity in the United Kingdom and is concerned with the creation, protection, and restoration of native woodland heritage. It has planted over 68 million trees since 1972. The Woodland Trust has three aims: to protect ancient woodland which is rare, unique and irreplaceable, to promote the restoration of damaged ancient woodland, and to plant native trees and woods to benefit people and wildlife.

The charity maintains ownership of over 1,000 sites covering over 33,000 hectares (330 square kilometres; 130 square miles) of which 8,070ha (33%) is ancient woodland. It ensures public access to its woods.

== History ==
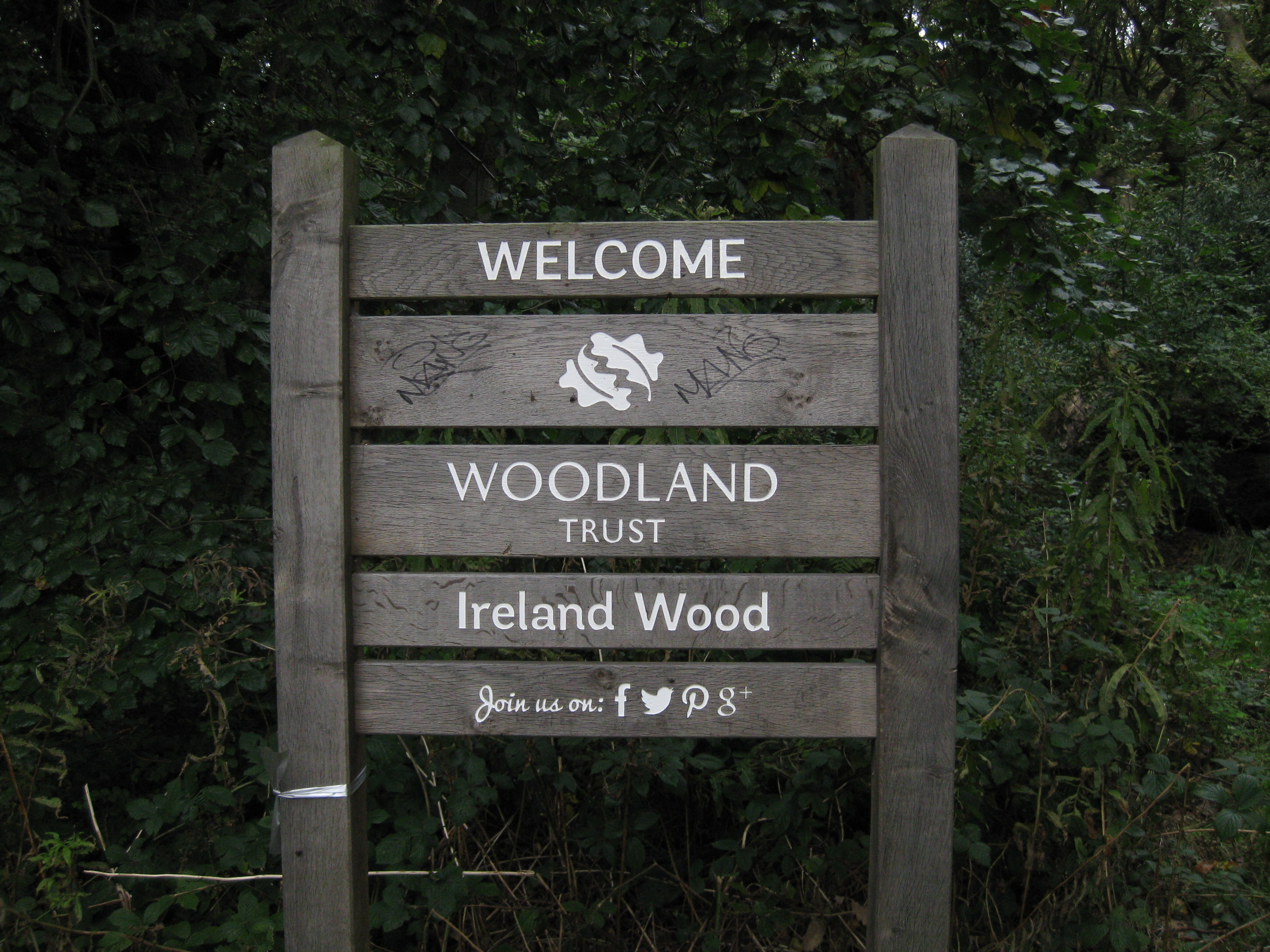
Signage in Ireland Wood, West Yorkshire

The charity was founded in Devon, England in 1972 by retired farmer and agricultural machinery dealer Kenneth Watkins.

The Trust's first purchase was part of the Avon Valley Woods, near Kingsbridge, Devon. By 1977 it had 22 woods in six counties. In 1978 it relocated to Grantham in Lincolnshire and announced an expansion of its activities across the UK. In 1984, Balmacaan Wood next to Loch Ness became the Trust's first Scottish acquisition.

From 2005 to 2008, the charity co-operated with the BBC for their Springwatch programme and the BBC's Breathing Places series of events held at woods. It continues to work with Springwatch and Autumnwatch, most recently in 2015 as part of the Big Spring Watch, which encouraged viewers to record the signs of nature (phenology) through the Trust's Nature's Calendar project.

=== Sites ===
As of 2024, the Woodland Trust had over 60 woods in Scotland, covering 11,000 hectares.

In Wales, it acquired the 94-acre (38 ha) Coed Lletywalter in Snowdonia National Park in 1980. In 2024 it had over 100 woods covering almost 3,000 hectares in Wales.

Work started in Northern Ireland in 1996 when the charity received a grant from the Millennium Commission to set up over 50 community woods in a scheme called Woods on Your Doorstep.

=== Headquarters ===
Its first employee and director, John James, came from Lincolnshire and was living in Nottingham at the time. It had a small office in Grantham, Lincolnshire. James was chief executive from 1992 to 1997, and then Michael Townsend from 1997 to 2004, Sue Holden from 2004 to 2014 and Beccy Speight from 2014 to 2019. The current chief executive is Darren Moorcroft.

A new eco-friendly headquarters, adjacent to the former offices, was completed in 2010 at a cost of £5.1million. The building, designed by Feilden Clegg Bradley Studios as architect and Atelier One as structural engineer, incorporates light shelves to distribute natural daylight around the 200 workstations, and concrete panels to absorb daytime heat, to provide the thermal mass that the lightweight wooden structure would otherwise lack. It is estimated that compared to a concrete framed construction, the timber structure saved the equivalent in carbon production as nine years of the building's operation.

== Structure ==
The Woodland Trust's head office is in Grantham, south Lincolnshire, and there are regional offices across the UK. It employs around 300 people at its Grantham headquarters. Its current president is Clive Anderson, since 2003. In 2016 Barbara Young, Baroness Young of Old Scone became the charity's chair.

=== Funding ===
The Woodland Trust receives funding from a wide range of sources including membership, legacies, donations and appeals, corporate supporters, grants and charitable trusts including lottery funding, other organisations and landfill tax.

== Function ==
The Woodland Trust uses its experience and authority in conservation to influence others who are in a position to improve the future of native woodland. This includes government, other landowners, and like-minded organisations. It also campaigns to protect and save ancient woodland from destructive development. Its projects also include the Nature Detectives youth programme, a project for schools learning about the seasonal effect on woodlands – phenology – and the Ancient Tree Hunt campaign.

=== Woodland protection ===
It looks after more than 1,000 woods and groups of woods covering 190 square kilometres (73 sq mi). Nearly 350 of its sites contain ancient woodland of which 70 per cent is semi-natural ancient woodland – land which has been under tree cover since at least 1600. It also manages over 110 Sites of Special Scientific Interest. There are currently over 600 ancient woods under threat across the UK.

=== Woodland creation ===
The trust has also created new woodlands: over 32 km^{2} (12 sq mi) have been created, including 250 new community woods in England, Wales and Northern Ireland. Its largest current projects include the 41.7 km^{2} (16.1 sq mi) Glen Finglas Estate in the Trossachs, Scotland and the Heartwood Forest near St Albans, Hertfordshire, England, which will cover approximately 347 ha (860 acres). It owns 20 sites covering 4.3 km^{2} (1.7 sq mi) in the National Forest and has twelve sites in Community Forests in England.

The Woodland Trust also provides free trees to communities or places of education in order to facilitate the creation of new woodland.

=== Completed projects ===
==== Millennium woods ====
The Woodland Trust's Woods on Your Doorstep project created 250 "Millennium woods" to celebrate the millennium.

==== Trafalgar Woods ====
As part of the trust's 'Tree For All' campaign, new woods were planted to mark the 2005 anniversary of the Battle of Trafalgar, notably Victory Wood in Kent.

==== Jubilee Woods ====
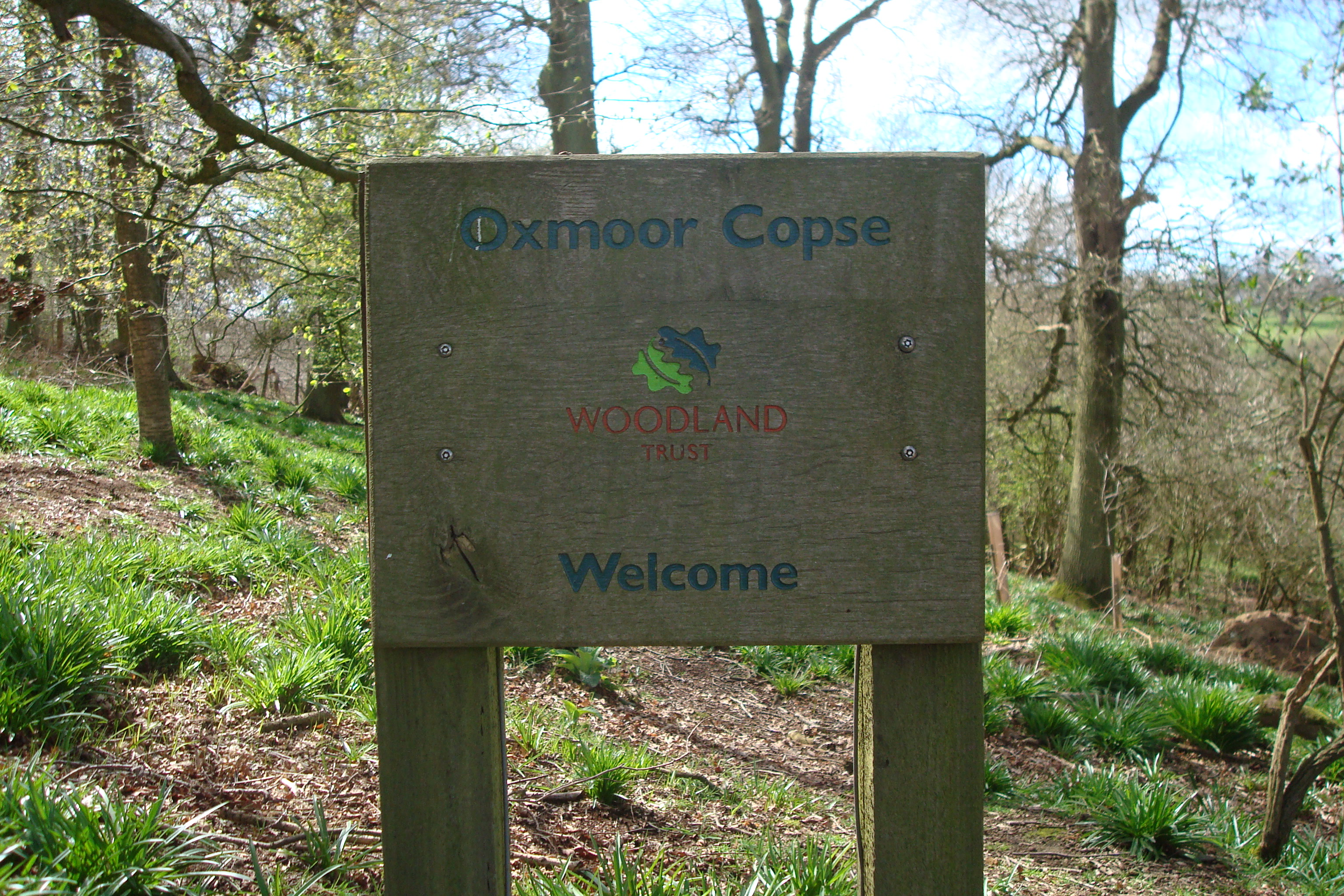
Oxmoor Copse in Surrey

The Trust ran the Jubilee Woods project, which aimed to plant 6 million trees and create 60 commemorative 'Diamond' woods across the UK as part of Elizabeth II's Diamond Jubilee celebrations in 2012. The largest of these, owned and managed by the Trust itself, is the Flagship Diamond Wood within the National Forest in Leicestershire, which will be planted with 300,000 trees.

==== First World War Centenary Woods ====
Beginning in 2014, a project commemorating the First World War involved tree planting and the establishment of new woodland sites across the UK. The planned sites were Langley Vale Wood (England), Dreghorn Woods (Scotland), Coed Ffos Las (Wales), and Brackfield Wood (Northern Ireland).

As part of the project, the Woodland Trust entered a partnership with the National Football Museum to create team groves to commemorate all the professional football players involved in the First World War, giving supporters the chance to dedicate trees at the English Centenary Wood, Langley Vale in Epsom.

=== Ongoing initiatives ===
==== Nature's Calendar ====
This citizen science project encourages members of the public to record the signs of the seasons near to them in order to show and assess the impact of climate change on the UK's wildlife. Thousands of volunteers send in their sightings, providing evidence about how wildlife is responding to the changing climate.

The Trust's records date back to 1736, making it the longest written biological record of its kind. It has become a powerful tool in assessing the impact of climate change and is valued by research scientists.

==== Ancient Tree Inventory ====
The Ancient Tree Inventory is a project run by the Woodland Trust in partnership with the Tree Register and the Ancient Tree Forum, which aims to record ancient, veteran and notable trees in the United Kingdom. As of 2022, over 180,000 trees have been recorded by members of the public on the project's website, which provides a map of the trees.

A 2026 study by Forest Research found that over a third of trees in the inventory were inaccessible to the public.

== Woods ==
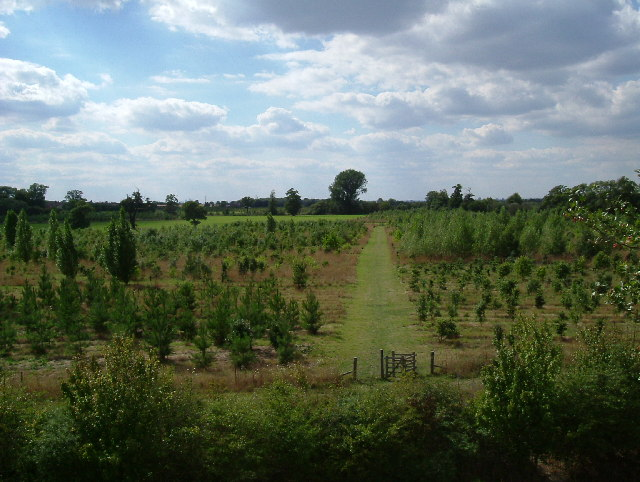
New woodland near South Ockendon, Essex

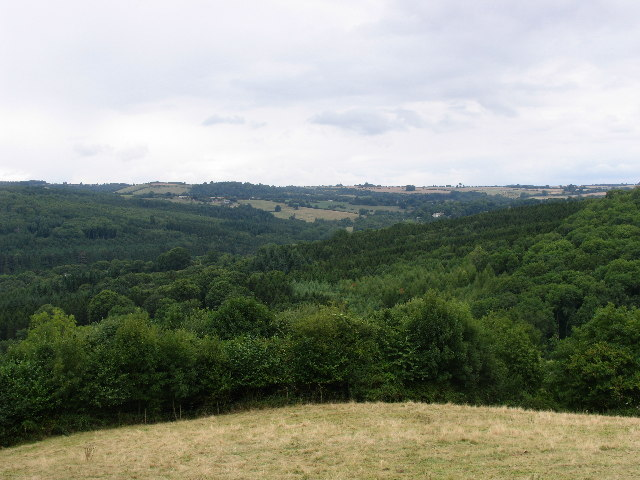
Lineover Wood SSSI, Gloucestershire

Woods that the trust owns and looks after include:

=== England ===
- Denge Wood, Kent
- Dick Buck's Burrows, Cromer, Norfolk
- Five Ponds Copse, Cheshire
- Folke Wood, Dorset
- Friezland Wood, Kent
- Furzehill Wood, Dorset
- Garratts Wood, Somerset
- Great Wood, Felbrigg Estate, Norfolk
- Hack Fall Wood, North Yorkshire
- Heartwood Forest, Hertfordshire
- Joyden's Wood, Kent
- Lineover Wood SSSI, Gloucestershire
- Oldmoor Wood, Nottinghamshire
- Oxmoor Copse, Surrey
- Philipshill Wood, Buckinghamshire
- Pretty Corner Wood, Sheringham, Norfolk
- Skipton Wood, North Yorkshire
- Tarn Wadling, Cumbria
- Uffmoor Wood, Worcestershire
- Warren Wood, Norfolk
- Whittaker Wood, Greater Manchester
- Whittlewood Forest, Northamptonshire
- Weybourne Wood, Weybourne, Norfolk
- West Runton, West Runton, Norfolk
- Wychwood, Oxfordshire

=== Scotland ===
- Backmuir Wood, Angus
- Glen Finglas Estate, the Trossachs

=== Wales ===
- Coed Felinrhyd & Llennyrch
- Coed Ffos Las

=== Northern Ireland ===
- Brackfield Wood
- Monkstown Wood

== See also ==
- Forestry in the United Kingdom
- Forestry Commission
- The Big Tree Plant
- The Tree Council
- The Tree Register
