= List of churches preserved by the Churches Conservation Trust in Southwest England =

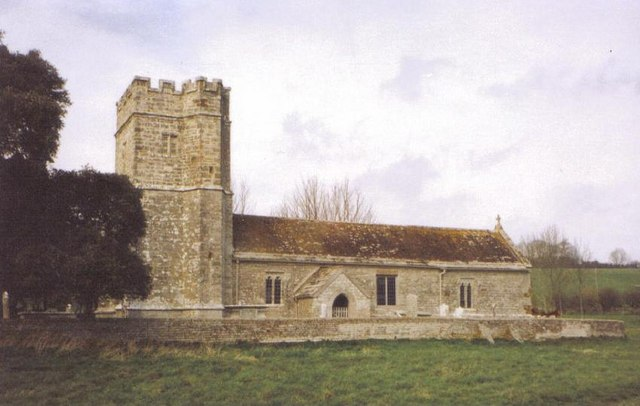
Whitcombe Church, Dorset

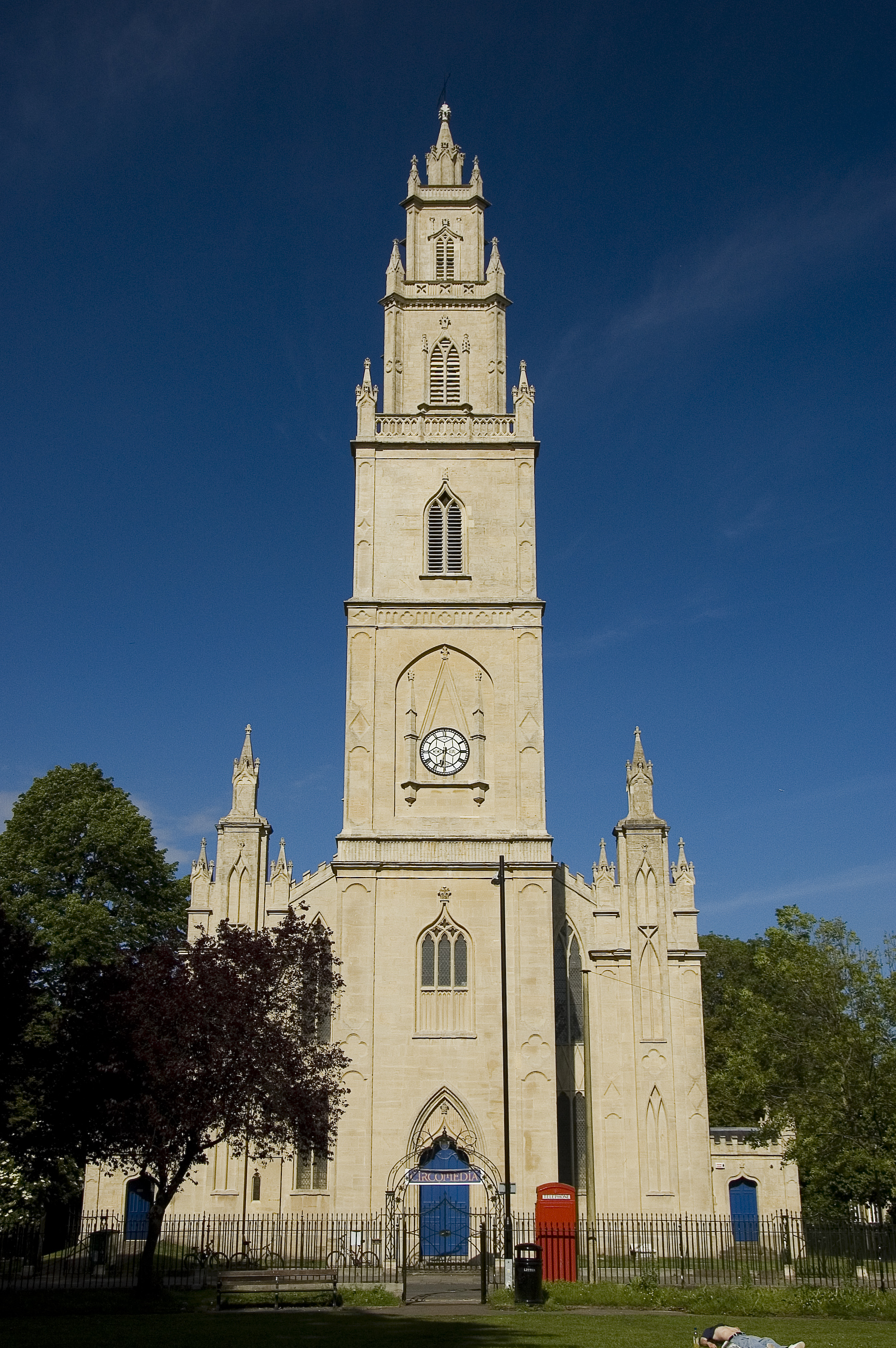
St Paul's Church, Bristol

The Churches Conservation Trust, which was initially known as the Redundant Churches Fund, is a charity whose purpose is to protect certain historic churches at risk, namely those that have been made redundant by the Church of England. The Trust was established by the Pastoral Measure of 1968. The legally defined object of the Trust is "the preservation, in the interests of the nation and the Church of England, of churches and parts of churches of historic and archaeological interest or architectural quality vested in the Fund ... together with their contents so vested". The charity cares for over 350 churches. The Trust is financed partly by the Department for Culture, Media and Sport and the Church Commissioners, but mostly from other sources, including the general public. The charity is run by a board of trustees, who delegate the day-to-day management to a chief executive and his senior management team.

The Trust's primary aim is to ensure that the buildings in its care are weatherproof and to prevent any deterioration in their condition. The majority of the churches remain consecrated, and many are occasionally still used for worship. Local communities are encouraged to use them for appropriate activities and events, and the buildings provide an educational resource, allowing children and young people to study history and architecture. Nearly 2 million people visit the Trust's churches each year. As most of the churches remain consecrated, they are used for occasional services where this is practical, and some are venues for concerts and other purposes.

This list contains the 62 churches cared for by the Churches Conservation Trust in South West England, covering the counties of Bristol, Wiltshire, Somerset, Dorset, Devon and Cornwall. The majority are village churches, and in the case of St Giles' church in Imber, Wiltshire, in a village from which the entire civilian population was evicted in 1943 to provide an exercise area for American troops preparing for the invasion of Europe during the Second World War. Non-military access to the church has been limited to several open days a year since then. Some of the churches are in major centres of population, such as St Martin's Church in Exeter and the Church of St John the Baptist in Bristol. Many of the churches are built on the sites of earlier places of worship, but the oldest building in the list is the Old Church of St Nicholas at Uphill, Somerset, which is largely roofless but is still occasionally used for services. The most recent is St Mary's Church in South Tidworth, Wiltshire, which was built in 1878. Some of the buildings, such as St Mary's Church in Wilton, Wiltshire, are partially ruined, but many have impressive interiors, often dating back several hundred years. St John the Baptist Church in Inglesham, Wiltshire, has wall paintings and other churches have highly decorated pulpits or reredos. Many still host Anglican services, but others are used by different denominations or have been converted for secular use. St Thomas à Becket Church in Pensford, Somerset, has been converted into a private house, although the tower remains in the care of the trust. St Paul's Church in Bristol is now used as a performance space and circus skills school, Circomedia, but remains consecrated.

== Key ==
Explanation of the three listed building grades
Grade	Criteria
I	Buildings of exceptional interest, sometimes considered to be internationally important
II*	Particularly important buildings of more than special interest
II	Buildings of national importance and special interest

== Churches ==
List of the churches with photographs, locations, year or era of construction and listed building grade
Church name and location	County and coordinates	Photograph	Date^{[A]}	Notes	Grade
Old Church of St Nicholas, Uphill	Somerset; 51.3203°N 2.9822°W		c. 1080	The church stands on a cliff top overlooking Brean Down and the mouth of the River Axe. During the Roman period a Romano-British temple was erected on the site, and there is evidence of a wooden church from about 700 AD, during the Anglo-Saxon era. The port at Uphill may have been a centre for pilgrims travelling to Glastonbury Abbey. The current Norman stone building has a central three-stage tower, chancel and unroofed nave. The building was remodelled in the later Middle Ages and restored in 1846. The porch was rebuilt in 1904, although the church had been partly in ruins since the building of a new parish church in 1844.	II*
St Nonna, Bradstone	Devon; 50.6056°N 4.2894°W		12th century	The church has an arcaded north aisle. The tracery in the south wall of the chancel is believed to date from 1261, when the church was dedicated by Bishop Walter Branscombe. The west tower was added in the 15th century.	I
St James, Cameley	Somerset; 51.3158°N 2.5603°W		12th century	The tower, probably from the 15th century with 19th-century restoration, is built of red Mendip stone, which contrasts with the local blue lias limestone of the rest of the church. The tower contains a bell dating from 1779 and made by William Bilbie of the Bilbie family. There are fragments of wall paintings on the north and south walls of the nave.	I
St Mary the Virgin, Tarrant Crawford	Dorset; 50.8306°N 2.1108°W		12th century	The church is all that remains of Tarrant Abbey, for which it may have been a lay church. The flint chancel dates from the 12th century, but the nave, tower, and porch were built in the 14th century. The interior includes several coffin lids from the 13th century. There is also 15th-century stained glass, a font from the 16th century, an octagonal pulpit, and pews with 17th-century moulded panelling. mediaeval wall paintings cover most of the walls of the nave and chancel, dating from the 13th and 14th centuries. Attendance at the church declined after the Second World War; it was declared redundant and became the responsibility of the Churches Conservation Trust in 1988.	I
Whitcombe Church, Whitcombe	Dorset; 50.6936°N 2.4025°W		12th century	The site of the church was used for worship in the Saxon era and there are fragments of two Saxon crosses. The nave of Whitcombe Church dates from the 12th century, with the chancel having been added in the 15th. The tower was added in the late 16th century. The interior includes several wall paintings, including one of St Christopher, and a 13th-century Purbeck marble font. William Barnes, the English writer, poet, minister, and philologist, was the curate at Whitcombe from 1847 to 1852, and again from 1862; he preached his first and last sermons in the church.	I
St Andrew, Winterborne Tomson	Dorset; 50.7817°N 2.165°W		12th century	The small flint Norman Anglican Church of St Andrew has an apse at the east end and a barrel vault roof which curves around it. The roof was replaced and windows inserted in the 16th century. The interior has limewashed walls, a 15th-century font, and a flag stone floor, along with early-18th-century oak fittings. By the early 20th century the church had fallen into disrepair and was being used as an animal shelter. Repairs were paid for by the Society for the Protection of Ancient Buildings, who sold a collection of Thomas Hardy's manuscripts to raise the funds.	I
St Thomas, Thurlbear, Orchard Portman	Somerset; 50.9893°N 3.0788°W		12th century	The church shows clear signs of the Norman church upon which later structures were built. Pevsner cites the Norman arcades and narrow aisles characteristic of that era and "never enlarged to satisfy later medieval taste." He dates the church to "hardly later than c. 1110." The Churches Conservation Trust launched a programme of repairs at the church, with the Somerset County Council conducting an archaeological recording and survey in conjunction with these efforts.	I
All Saints, Idmiston	Wiltshire; 51.135°N 1.7194°W		12th century	The church was built of flint with interspersed limestone in the 12th and 13th centuries. It was heavily restored by John Loughborough Pearson and Ewan Christian between 1865 and 1867, when the upper section of the tower was rebuilt. It includes a collection of mediaeval carvings, internally there are elegant corbel-heads and roof bosses, and externally gargoyles. Attendance at the church dwindled and it closed and was declared redundant, before being taken over by the Redundant Churches Fund in 1978. The church is rarely used for services.	I
St Mary, Hardington	Somerset; 51.2710°N 2.3691°W		12th century	The Norman church underwent major renovation in the 14th, 15th, 17th and 19th centuries. The 19th-century work is attributed to the office of Sir George Gilbert Scott. The tower, which was built between 1480 and 1500, is one of the smallest complete church towers in England. The interior includes box pews, a pulpit, altar rails, and the remains of wall paintings.	I
St Anthony, St Anthony in Roseland	Cornwall; 50.1494°N 5.0042°W		12th century	The church was established by the prior of the Augustinian Priory at Plympton in Devon. In 1150 the church was dedicated to St Antoninus. After the dissolution of 1538 part of the priory was used as a residence and parts were pulled down: much of the stone went towards the building of St Mawes Castle. The church still has its original mediaeval cruciform plan, more or less as it was built in the 12th and 13th centuries, despite having been extensively restored in the 19th century.	II*
St Nicholas, Brockley	Somerset; 51.3994°N 2.7692°W		12th century	The Norman church has a pinnacled tower which was added in the 15th century, and the whole church was extensively renovated in the 1820s. The font is Norman and there is a stone pulpit dating from around 1480.	II*
Blessed Virgin Mary, Emborough	Somerset; 51.26°N 2.5539°W		12th century	It was originally built in the 12th century, with 14th and 18th-century alterations and some further restoration in the 19th century. The inside includes a Georgian gallery and a cast iron "Gurney Stove", invented by Goldsworthy Gurney.	II*
All Saints Church, Alton Priors	Wiltshire; 51.3581°N 1.8444°W		12th century	The church was built of limestone and malmstone rubble in the 12th century, but has undergone several major refurbishments since. In the 18th century the nave, two–stage west tower and chancel were replaced. The church contains Jacobean stall fronts and a 16th-century tomb-chest and memorial. In the floor of the church are trapdoors giving access to Sarsen stones, which, along with a 1,700-year-old Yew tree in the churchyard, suggest it was a sacred site long before the church was built. The church is no longer used on a regular basis, but three services are held each year.	II*
St Leonard, Berwick St Leonard	Wiltshire; 51.0975°N 2.1103°W		12th century	The manor was held by Shaftesbury Abbey's endowment of Tisbury. The church was built of flint and limestone, in the 12th century. By the 19th century the fabric of the building was decaying, and in 1859 a major restoration was undertaken. The font and a sculptured relief of the Lamb of God over the south doorway date from the Norman era. The church was closed in 1966 and declared redundant in 1973.	II*
St Mary, Maddington, Shrewton	Wiltshire; 51.1983°N 1.9011°W		12th century	The church has Norman origins, and belonged to Amesbury Priory in 1179; the earliest parts of the existing building dating from the late 12th and early 13th centuries, but there have been several alterations since, including the renewal of the roof of the nave in 1603. In 1853 the chancel was rebuilt and the whole church restored by Thomas Henry Wyatt, including the erection of the gabled porch. The walls of the nave and chancel have a chequerboard pattern of flint and sandstone. There is a low west tower. The interior includes a large plaster cartouche of strapwork enclosing the date 1637, which may be the construction date of a gallery which has since been demolished. The stained glass includes work by Alexander Gibbs in the south aisle. The church was declared redundant in 1975.	II*
St Leonard, Sutton Veny	Wiltshire; 51.1728°N 2.1325°W		12th century	The cruciform church was started in the 12th century, revised in the 13th and 16th centuries, and underwent a major restoration in 1831. Subsidence because of low lying damp ground caused further damage, and by 1866 the decision had been made to build a new church. This was dedicated to St John the Evangelist, designed by John Loughborough Pearson and built on higher ground 700 yards (640 m) to the north west, opening in 1868. Only the chancel, which was used as a mortuary chapel, remains in usable condition. It contains benefaction boards, a bier, font, bell and memorials on the walls. The nave, transepts and crossing are ruined. The church was declared redundant in 1970.	II
St John the Baptist, Inglesham, Swindon	Wiltshire; 51.6843°N 1.7045°W		c. 1205	St John the Baptist Church has Anglo-Saxon origins but most of the current structure was built in about 1205. Much of the church has not changed since the mediaeval era. The church is located just above the surrounding water meadows adjacent to the confluence of the River Thames, River Coln and the Thames and Severn Canal. Much of the fabric of the building is from the 13th century, but includes remains of an earlier church on the site. The interior includes wall paintings spanning more than 600 years, often one on top of the other up to seven layers thick. There is also a carving of the Mother and Child dating from the time of the Anglo-Saxons. Until 1910 the carving was on the outside of the church attached to the south wall and was used as a sundial. There are also historic box pews, a pulpit and memorials.	I
St Peter the Poor Fisherman, Revelstoke, Noss Mayo	Devon; 50.3117°N 4.0386°W		1226	The mediaeval church has Saxon origins with parts built in the 13th, 14th and 15th centuries. The aisle and the porch still have their carved wagon roofs, but the roofs have collapsed elsewhere in the building. In about 1870 a new church, also named St Peters, was built nearby and this church fell into disrepair. It is still consecrated and occasional services are held in the church during the summer.	I
St Petrock, Parracombe	Devon; 51.1883°N 3.8978°W		13th century	The church is dedicated to St Petrock. Parts of the building, including the chancel and the lower part of the tower remain from the 13th century, but much of the current fabric dates from a reconstruction in the early 16th century. In 1879 there were worries about the stability of the building however protests led by John Ruskin who donated £10 led to the preservation of the church and the construction of a new one further west in the village. The interior includes 18th-century box pews, a Georgian pulpit and a screen with a wooden tympanum above it which dates from the 18th century.	I
West Ogwell Church, Ogwell	Devon; 50.5186°N 3.6675°W		13th century	The chancel and nave were built around 1300. The two-stage west tower, with its battlemented parapet, was added around 1400. The interior includes a 13th-century sedilia and a Jacobean pulpit. The other features including the box pews, tower screen, and curved communion rails are late Georgian.	I
All Saints, Nether Cerne	Dorset; 50.7825°N 2.47°W		13th century	The church and adjacent manor house are built of bands of flint and stone. Most of the church dates from the 13th century, although the tower, with its pinnacles and gargoyle, and porch were added in the 15th. The interior of the church includes a melon-shaped 12th-century font, believed to come from an earlier church on the same site.	I
St Saviour, Puxton	Somerset; 51.3652°N 2.8536°W		13th century	A small, mostly unaltered mediaeval church with a leaning tower that started to settle towards the south-west during its construction because of its peaty foundations. As a result, the 15th-century tower was never built as high as was intended. The church is externally perpendicular in style, with an earlier Saxo-Norman nave. The interior of the church is very light with a floor of irregular stone flags into which several ledger stones are set. The oak box pews on the north side of the nave are probably early 18th century, and the oak reading desk and pulpit are Jacobean.	I
St Michael, Clapton in Gordano	Somerset; 51.4583°N 2.7673°W		13th century	The 12th-century tympanum is the oldest visible part of the church to have survived, however the majority of the building is from the 13th century. Inside are reredos and benches, a 14th century font and a late-17th-century monument. The first record of the church is in an agreement dated 1226 between William, son of Arthur de Clopton and Richard of Keynsham Abbey, relating to rights to gather timber and fodder in the area. The 13th-century oak screen in the church originally divided the Great Hall and the Buttery in the adjacent Court House.	I
St Mary Magdalene, Stocklinch	Somerset; 50.9492°N 2.8733°W		13th century	The church, which is 62 by 12 feet (18.9 m × 3.7 m) is built of local Hamstone with a Welsh slate roof. The interior includes Victorian stained glass, and a 13th-century effigy of a woman on the sill of the south window. The font is Norman.	I
St Giles, Imber	Wiltshire; 51.2344°N 2.0511°W		13th century	The church was built of dressed limestone in the late 13th century, replacing a church which had stood on the site since the 12th century. The tower with its five pinnacles and the north and south aisles followed in the 14th century. Extensive rebuilding was undertaken in the 19th century. The village of Imber is now part of the British Army's training grounds on the Salisbury Plain. The entire civilian population was evicted in 1943 to provide an exercise area for American troops preparing for the invasion of Europe during the Second World War. In 2001 the church was declared redundant. The church tower was struck by lightning in 2003, weakening the structure, but restoration work began in 2008 and an annual service resumed in September 2009 on completion of the works.	I
St Mary and St Lawrence, Stratford Tony	Wiltshire; 51.0369°N 1.8706°W		13th century	The stone and flint church is on the banks of the River Ebble and accessed down a narrow lane, then across a stream and up a steep bank on foot. The chancel dates from the 14th, and the tower from the 15th, while the nave was rebuilt in the 18th century. The interior of the church includes a 14th-century font and box pews with colonnaded tops. The stained glass in the east window was installed by the studio of Charles Eamer Kempe in 1884. There is a large Yew tree in the churchyard with a girth of more than 11 feet (3.4 m).	I
St Martin, Elworthy	Somerset; 51.1067°N 3.3114°W		13th century	The church is dedicated to St Martin of Tours. Whilst the unbuttressed two-stage crenellated tower is from the 13th century the porch and nave roof are from the late 15th century. The chancel was rebuilt in 1695 and again in 1846. It is built of red sandstone with Ham stone dressings and a slate roof. The church was declared redundant 1979.	II*
St Nicholas, Berwick Bassett	Wiltshire; 51.4608°N 1.8597°W		13th century	St Nicholas Church dates from the early 13th century. In 1857 the church had a major restoration by Thomas Henry Wyatt.	II*
St George, Orcheston	Wiltshire; 51.2031°N 1.9156°W		13th century	The church is built of flint and has a Norman north door. The windows in the nave and Early English chancel and low tower date from the 13th century. The church was restored in 1833 during which the roof of nave was raised.	II*
St Andrew, Rollestone, Shrewton	Wiltshire; 51.1872°N 1.8964°W		13th century	St Andrew's Church was built in the early 13th century of flint and stone in a chequerwork pattern. It has two large Perpendicular windows, and a font from the 13th century. The oak benches were brought from the redundant church of St Catherine's at Haydon, Dorset in 1981.	II*
St James, Draycot Cerne, Sutton Benger	Wiltshire; 51.5064°N 2.0956°W		c. 1300	The exact date of construction of St James's Church is unknown, but around 1300. The church has an Early English chancel which is lower than the floor of the 13th-century nave. The tower dates from the 17th century and the church was altered and restored in the 19th century. The interior includes a gothic pulpit and box pews. There are also Victorian stained glass windows and monuments including a perpendicular tomb chest, a 13th-century knight's effigy, said to be Phillip de Cerne, and a bust by Joseph Wilton to Sir Robert Long.	II*
Borbach Chantry, West Dean, Salisbury	Wiltshire; 51.0458°N 1.6364°W		1333	The chapel was built of flint with limestone dressings, about 1333 by Robert de Borbach as part of a 14th-century parish church, but is all that remains. When the church was demolished in 1868 the arcade connecting the chapel to the church was walled up and a new south porch added. The chapel contains a number of monuments, including those to John Evelyn who died in 1706 and his family. Other memorials are to the Pierrepont family who also lived in the adjacent manor house which has since been demolished. The church was declared redundant in 1971.	I
St John the Baptist, Broad Street	Bristol; 51.4563°N 2.5966°W		14th century	The church was built in the 14th century (and heavily modified in the 19th century) with the tower and steeple over St John's Gate, the last remaining city gateway. The church is very narrow as it is built into and alongside the City Walls, and is consequently also known as St John's on the Wall. The building was closed for worship by the Church Commissioners in 1984.	I
St Peter, Winterborne Came	Dorset; 50.6953°N 2.4192°W		14th century	The nave dates from the 14th century and the current chancel is from a 15th-century rebuilding. Later in the 15th century the west tower was added and the nave refenestrated. The interior includes an octagonal 14th century font and an oak pulpit from 1624. The Revd William Barnes an English writer, poet, minister, and philologist was the rector of the church from 1862 to 1886. He is buried in the churchyard beneath a 'Celtic' cross.	I
St Mary, North Huish	Devon; 50.3947°N 3.8144°W		14th century	Although some parts of the church are 14th century, the south aisle is 15th century. A rector was recorded in 1308 and the reconstruction of the church was dedicated in 1336 by Bishop John Grandisson. The building also underwent extensive renovation in the 19th century. The two-stage west tower has buttresses on each corner. The ringing stage is reached by a polygonal stair turret on the north side. The tower is surmounted by an octagonal recessed spire. The interior includes early screens and the moulded octagonal granite font is dated 1662, but the rest of the furnishings, polygonal wooden pulpit and wall tablets are Victorian.	I
Old Holy Trinity, Bothenhampton	Dorset; 50.7236°N 2.7444°W		14th century	The chancel and the 15th-century tower are the only parts of this mediaeval parish church to survive, after the nave was demolished and a new Holy Trinity Church built in 1889. Subsequently, the chancel was used as a mortuary chapel. In 1971, the dilapidated state of the church led to it being formally declared redundant and in 1972 it became the responsibility of the Redundant Churches Fund which became the Churches Conservation Trust. The interior of the church includes an early Georgian reredos.	I
St Mary, Old Dilton	Wiltshire; 51.2403°N 2.2039°W		14th century	The interior of the church was renovated in the 18th century, and includes a three-decker pulpit, and two small galleries. The population of Old Dilton declined as residents moved to Dilton Marsh and the church became redundant, however it remains consecrated.	I
St Thomas the Martyr, St Thomas Street	Bristol; 51.4527°N 2.5914°W		14th century	It has a 14th-century tower, but the nave was rebuilt between 1791 and 1793 by James Allen. A substantial reordering was carried out by William Venn Gough between 1878 and 1880, and the top of the tower was remodelled with spirelet, pinnacles, and pierced parapet by Gough in 1896–97. Although the church survived the "Bristol Blitz" of the Second World War, the congregation declined after the war and the church was finally declared redundant and placed under the care of the Churches Conservation Trust in 1982.	II*
All Saints, Otterhampton	Somerset; 51.1831°N 3.0797°W		14th century	A church was established on the site in the 12th century overlooking the River Parrett. It was valued at £5 in 1291. The majority of the fabric of the current building dates from the 14th. The perpendicular west tower was added later and has an Elizabethan bell-frame with four bells, one of which dates from the 16th century and two others that are dated 1617 and 1737. The original dedication was to St Peter, however it was later renamed All Saints. The interior includes a Norman font with a Jacobean cover, a screen from the 16th century and 17th-century communion rails.	II*
St Thomas à Becket, Pensford	Somerset; 51.371°N 2.5466°W		14th century	The west tower and tierceron vault date from the 14th century. The west doorway with a two-centred arch, dates back to the 15th century, and the font which has quatrefoils and roses, is of similar age. The rest of the church was rebuilt in 1869, by C.E. Giles of Taunton. Every inch of the Jacobean pulpit is carved with squares, circles, and leaves. It is currently on the English Heritage Buildings at Risk Register, following flood damage from the River Chew in 1968. In 2007 the church was put on the market for redevelopment, and in 2008 purchased for repair and use as a private dwelling, although the tower is still in the care of the trust.	II*
St Andrew, Northover, Ilchester	Somerset; 51.0058°N 2.6806°W		14th century	The church stands close to the River Yeo and on the site of an earlier Roman building and associated cemetery next to the Fosse Way. It was also the site of a minster church in the Saxon era, when it was held by Glastonbury Abbey. After the Norman Conquest it was held by Maurice, Bishop of London until it was appropriated by St John's Hospital, Bridgwater, in 1219. The building was restored in 1878 by Charles Benson.	II*
Old Church of St James, Upton	Somerset; 51.0553°N 3.4594°W		14th century	Only the tower of the Old St James's Church remains, overlooking Wimbleball Lake. The only parts of the 14th-century church which remain are from the lowest courses of the nave and chancel, and the three-stage tower, which is unbuttressed. The current parish church of St James was built in 1870 to replace this church.	II*
St Nicholas, Fisherton Delamere	Wiltshire; 51.1489°N 2.0022°W		14th century	The church, which was built in a chequerboard pattern of flint and stone, sits on a hill overlooking the River Wylye. It was built on the site of a Norman church in the 14th century and was substantially rebuilt in the 19th century. In the 1830s and 1860s John Davis organised the work including the demolition and rebuilding of the chancel under the supervision of W. Hardwick, a Warminster surveyor.	II*
All Saints, Leigh	Wiltshire; 51.6283°N 1.9114°W		14th century	Most of the 14th-century Anglican parish church was demolished and rebuilt at a drier site between 1896 and 1897, by Charles Ponting, at a cost of £1,300, leaving just the chancel and the east gable of the old nave. There are some 13th and 15th-century arches, windows, and other features remaining. On the wall of the chancel are 17th-century texts painted on the walls and framed in designs of clouds and scrolls.	II*
Holy Trinity, Torbryan	Devon; 50.4894°N 3.665°W		15th century	The church was built between 1450 and 1470. The vestry was added in the 19th century. It has a Perpendicular three-stage tower with an octagonal stair turret on the south wall. The interior includes a mediaeval carved rood-screen, with panels showing paintings of saints and stained glass from the same period.	I
St Peter, Satterleigh	Devon; 50.9867°N 3.8992°W		15th century	The church is mainly 15th century, although it may incorporate parts of an earlier building. It has an aisleless nave, and a wooden bell-cote. The chancel was rebuilt in 1852 as part of a wider restoration.	I
St Edwold, Stockwood	Dorset; 50.8603°N 2.5836°W		15th century	The single-celled building of St Edwold's Church is often described as Dorset's smallest. The porch has the date "1636" inscribed, reflecting the fact that the church was rebuilt to some extent in the 17th century when a bell turret was also installed. Inside, the church is very plainly furnished. The dedication to St Edwold (9th century) is unique in Dorset.	I
St Martin, Cathedral Close, Exeter	Devon; 50.7231°N 3.53111°W		15th century	It is built of Heavitree stone and has slate roofs. The chancel arch is thought to be the oldest part of the building, and may date from the previous church on the site which was consecrated on 6 July 1065 by Bishop Leofric. There are traces of Anglo-Saxon long-and-short work high in the north-east corner of the nave. The tower was added in 1675. The interior contains 17th and 18th-century monuments, reredos and altar rails, some of which were brought from the nearby St Paul's, which was demolished in 1936. The south window contains a few fragments of mediaeval glass. At the west end is a panelled gallery with the painted arms of Bishop Trelawny and the City of Exeter, both flanking the royal coat of arms.	I
St James, Luffincott	Devon; 50.7275°N 4.3639°W		15th century	Some parts of the church are the original mediaeval structure however the tower was rebuilt in 1791 as part of a wider renovation. The interior includes Georgian sash windows and a simple 14th-century granite font.	I
All Saints, Langport	Somerset; 51.0372°N 2.8256°W		15th century	All Saints has 12th-century origins but was rebuilt in the late 15th century. The Perpendicular octagonal three-stage tower, dates from around 1455, but the top section was rebuilt in 1833. It has a number of interesting gargoyles known locally as 'hunky punks'. The East window of the chancel contains a set of late-15th-century glass depicting various saints, appropriate to the dedication "All Saints". Although restored in the 19th century it is one of the best preserved mediaeval windows in Somerset. Additionally it is unusual in that the window contains a full set of glass from the same period. The church is no longer used for services, its congregation has been merged with nearby St Mary's.	I
St Mary, Seavington St Mary	Somerset; 50.9306°N 2.8511°W		15th century	The former Anglican parish Church of St Mary has 13th-century origins, but the present building is from the late 15th century, with restoration around 1880. The three-stage tower is from the 16th century. It was previously held as a chapelry of South Petherton by Bruton Abbey and after the dissolution of the monasteries belonged to Bristol Cathedral. Since 1983 it has been declared a redundant church.	II*
St Mary, Wilton	Wiltshire; 51.0797°N 1.8633°W		15th century	St Marys was built on the site of an earlier church at which Bishop Robert de Bingham was consecrated in 1229 before the completion of his cathedral church at Salisbury. By the ninth century the Benedictine convent of Wilton Abbey was attached to the church. During the 14th and 15th centuries other mediaeval churches in Wilton closed and combined with St Mary's which was rebuilt and expanded to become, by the 16th century, the sole parish church. The old church was partially demolished, apart from the chancel and one bay of the nave. The ruins of the three arches of the south arcade, and fragments of the north arcade and the altered eastern arch of the west tower or west window remain within the churchyard. Restoration was undertaken between 1933 and 1939, by Robert Worth Bingham, who was the United States Ambassador to the United Kingdom from 1933 to 1937 and claimed descent from Robert de Bingham. The church was made redundant in 1972.	II*
Old Church of St Cuthbert, Oborne	Dorset; 50.9589°N 2.4939°W		1533	Only the chancel remains of St Cuthbert's Church, which would have been one of the last to be built before the Reformation, following the demolition of the nave in the 1860s. The neglected chancel was restored in the 1930s. The interior includes mediaeval slip tiles and communion rails, pulpit and monuments from the 17th century. The pillar piscina and font were brought to St Cuthbert's from North Wootton. A new parish church, designed by William Slater, was built on a fresh site in the villages and consecrated in 1862.	II*
St Andrew, Holcombe	Somerset; 51.2547°N 2.4758°W		16th century	The church has late Saxon-early Norman origins and was rebuilt in the 16th century, with a two-stage tower and two bay nave. The interior includes late Georgian box pews and a Jacobean pulpit.	II*
St George, Isle of Portland	Dorset; 50.547°N 2.4438°W		1754–1766	St George's Church was built to replace St Andrew's which had fallen into disuse and was no longer suitable as a place of worship. The church was closed in 1914 and fell into further disrepair until restoration in the 1960s. It is a large church built of Portland stone and has a tower, a nave, transepts, an apse, and a dome over the crossing.	II
St Paul, Portland Square	Bristol; 51.4611°N 2.5847°W		1789–1794	It was designed by Daniel Hague and built in the 1790s but fell into disuse and disrepair by its closure in 1988. St Paul's became known as the Wedding Cake Church from the unusual tiered tower, which was designed to hold a ring of ten bells. About £2.3 million from the Heritage Lottery Fund funded the restoration and conversion work. In 2005 the church was converted into its present form as the home of Circomedia, a circus school. It still boasts an ornate Georgian plaster ceiling, stone columns and a wealth of decorative stained glass, but has now been equipped with aerial and trapeze equipment and a pale maple wood sprung dance floor.	I
St Michael, Princetown	Devon; 50.5461°N 3.9961°W		1810–1814	The granite Church of St Michael, which is sometimes known as St Michael and All Angels church stands near the middle of Dartmoor, close to Dartmoor Prison. The church was designed by the architect Daniel Alexander and built by prisoners from the Napoleonic Wars and finished by those captured during the American war who were held in the prison, and is the only church in England to have been built by prisoners of war. The church remained in service until 1992 when it was declared redundant.	II*
St Peter, Everleigh	Wiltshire; 51.2864°N 1.7172°W		1813	Everleigh had a parish church by 1228, when it was granted to the Benedictine Wherwell Abbey in Hampshire. However, the mediaeval parish church was demolished in 1814 when the present Church of England parish church of Saint Peter, built by John Morlidge for F.D. Astley, was consecrated on a site about 0.5 miles (800 m) north west of it. The present church was designed by the architect John Morlidge in a Georgian Gothic Revival style. It includes the original Norman font from the old church. It has many memorials to the Astley family.	II*
Sutton Mallet Church, Sutton Mallet, Stawell	Somerset; 51.1283°N 2.8978°W		1827–1829	The current church was built between 1827 and 1829 by Richard Carver of Taunton adjoining the old tower. Although the rebuilding was in a Georgian style, remnants from the earlier church were reused including a mediaeval window which was incorporated into the small apse. In 1987 the church was transferred to the Redundant Churches Fund.	II
St Margaret of Antioch, Leigh Delamere	Wiltshire; 51.5122°N 2.1678°W		1846	The earlier church was built in about 1190, in an Early English style with some Norman features. In 1301 the patron of the church was John De la Mare. By 1846 the church was in a dilapidated condition and it would have cost more to repair than to rebuild. The new church was commissioned by Joseph Neeld and designed by James Thomson. The Gothic chancel includes a reredos carved and decorated in many colours. The west window includes stained glass by Wilmshurst. The church contains many memorials, including those to the Neeld Baronets. A new organ was installed in 1896, and electricity supplied in 1949, although by then attendance was very low. The church was closed as a regular place of worship in 1992.	II*
St Mary, Chute Forest	Wiltshire; 51.2669°N 1.5583°W		1870–1871	St Mary's Church was consecrated in 1875. The church was built of flint, brick and tile with a pyramid spire, by John Loughborough Pearson for the Fowle family. The nave and aisles are spanned by a single roof. It contains stained glass by Clayton and Bell a partnership of John Richard Clayton (London, 1827–1913) and Alfred Bell (Silton, Dorset, 1832–95).	II*
St Mary, South Tidworth,	Wiltshire; 51.2283°N 1.6644°W		1878	Built of rock-faced brown stone in a Gothic Revival style by John Johnson, the construction work was supervised by G. H. Gordon, for Sir John Kelk of the Kelk Baronets. The chancel is 28 by 17 feet (8.5 m × 5.2 m) and the nave 43 by 17 feet (13.1 m × 5.2 m). There are also north and south aisles, a north vestry, and a south porch. The interior contains carvings and polished marble shafts in the columns of the arcade piers. The chancel floor is laid with Italian mosaic. The church was declared redundant in 1972.	I

== See also ==
- List of churches preserved by the Churches Conservation Trust in the East of England
- List of churches preserved by the Churches Conservation Trust in the English Midlands
- List of churches preserved by the Churches Conservation Trust in Northern England
- List of churches preserved by the Churches Conservation Trust in Southeast England

== Notes ==
^{A} The dates given for construction are often not exactly known. Where this is the case the century of first construction of the existing building is given.
