= Old St Cuthbert's Church, Oborne =

Church in Dorset, England

St Cuthbert's Church
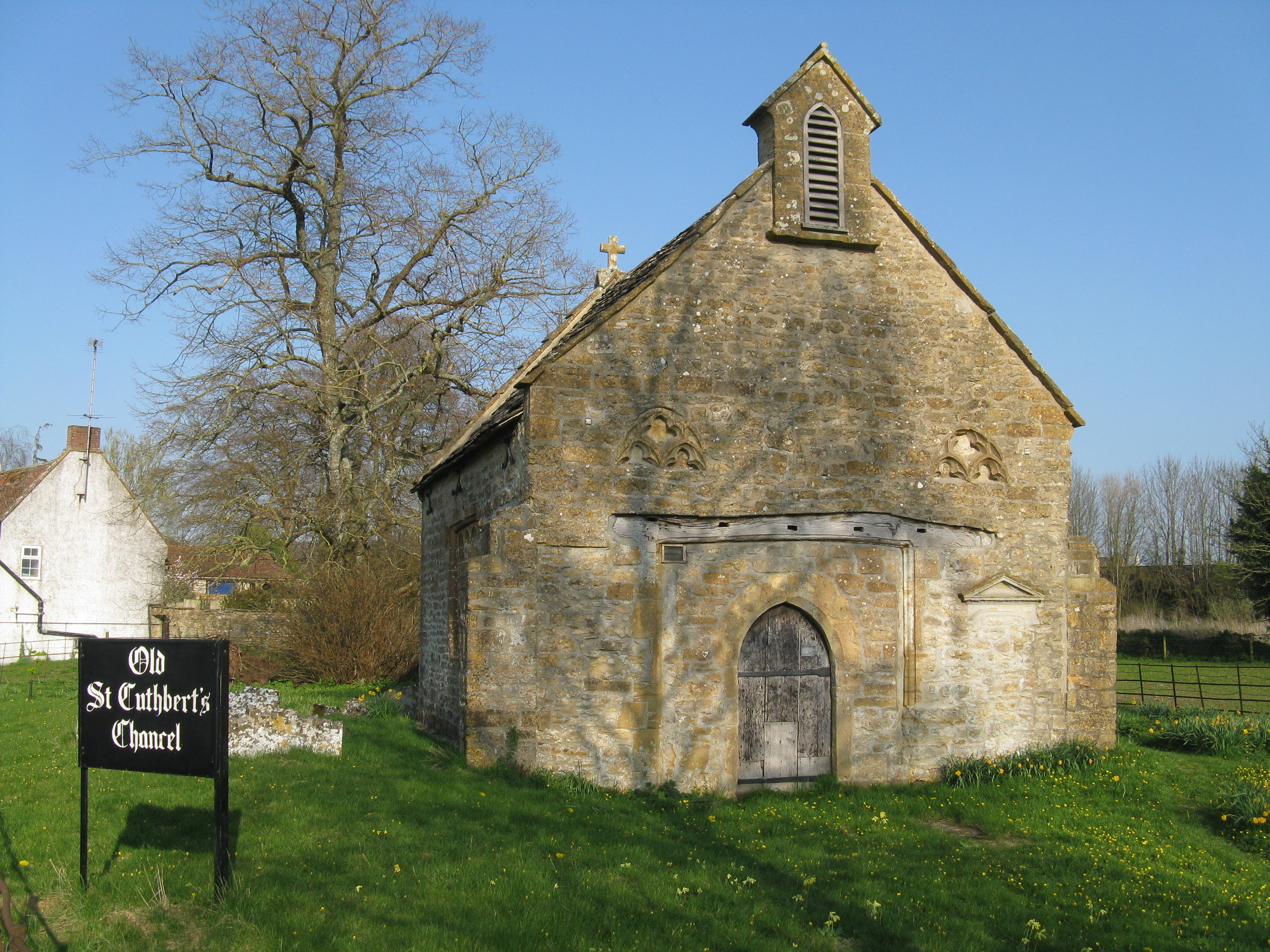

- Location within Dorset
- 50°57′32″N 2°29′38″W
- Location: Oborne, Dorset, England

History
- Built: 1533

Listed Building – Grade II*
- Official name: Old Parish Church of St Cuthbert
- Designated: 31 July 1961
- Reference no.: 1304077

The Old St Cuthbert's Church in Oborne, Dorset, England was built in 1533. It is recorded in the National Heritage List for England as a designated Grade II* listed building, and is a redundant church in the care of the Churches Conservation Trust. It was declared redundant on 18 December 1973, and was vested in the Trust on 23 July 1975.

Only the chancel remains of St Cuthbert's Church, which would have been one of the last to be built before the Reformation, following the demolition of the nave in the 1860s. The neglected chancel was restored in the 1930s, when a new incumbent began to restore it, taking advice from A. R. Powys (secretary of the Society for the Protection of Ancient Buildings) who was also responsible for the restoration of St Andrew's Church at Winterborne Tomson.

The parish of Oborne had been given to Sherborne Abbey by the Saxon King Edgar in the 10th century and it remained a chapel of ease to the abbey until the Dissolution in 1539.

The interior includes mediaeval slip tiles and communion rails, pulpit and monuments from the 17th century. The pillar piscina and font were brought to St Cuthbert's from North Wootton. Above the lintels of windows on the east and north sides are inscriptions entreating prayers for the good standing of Abbot John Myer (1533) and Sacristan John Dunster of Sherborne.

A new parish church, designed by William Slater, was built on a fresh site in the village and consecrated in 1862.

== See also ==
- List of churches preserved by the Churches Conservation Trust in South West England
