= Church of St Martin, Elworthy =

Church in Somerset, England

Church of St Martin
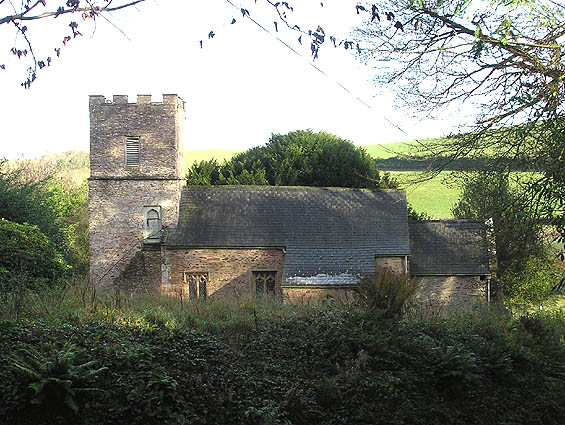

- Location within Somerset
- 51°06′24″N 3°18′41″W
- Location: Elworthy, Somerset, England

History
- Built: 13th century

Listed Building – Grade II*
- Official name: Church of St Martin
- Designated: 22 May 1969
- Reference no.: 1057601

The Church of St Martin in Elworthy, Somerset, England, is dedicated to St Martin of Tours. It dates from the 13th century and is recorded in the National Heritage List for England as a designated Grade II* listed building.

Whilst the unbuttressed 2-stage crenellated tower is from the 13th century the porch and nave roof are from the late 15th century. The chancel was rebuilt in 1695 and again in 1846. It is built of red sandstone with Ham stone dressings and a slate roof. Within the church is an unusual alabaster font made with stone from a quarry near Watchet.

In 1969 the parish became a chapelry of Monksilver, within the benefice of Monksilver with Brompton Ralph and Nettlecombe.

It is a redundant church in the care of the Churches Conservation Trust. The church was declared redundant on 1 August 1975, and was vested in the Trust on 19 December 1979.

== See also ==
- List of churches preserved by the Churches Conservation Trust in South West England
