= St Mary & St Lawrence's Church, Stratford Tony =

St Mary & St Lawrence's Church
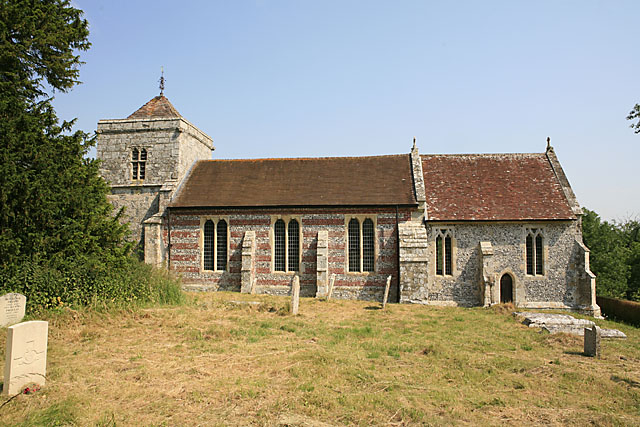

- Location within Wiltshire
- 51°02′13″N 1°52′14″W
- Location: Stratford Tony, Wiltshire, England

History
- Built: 13th century

Listed Building – Grade I
- Official name: Church of St. Mary and St. Lawrence
- Designated: 23 March 1960
- Reference no.: 1181901

The Church of St Mary & St Lawrence in the village of Stratford Tony, south Wiltshire, England, was built in the 13th century. It stands on the south bank of the River Ebble, accessed from the north down a lane, across the river and up a bank.

It is recorded in the National Heritage List for England as a Grade I listed building, and is a redundant church, in the care of the Churches Conservation Trust since 1986.

== Architecture ==
The chancel dates from the 14th century, and was built on the site of an earlier church. The low 14th-century west tower is built with large Chilmark stone blocks and flint chequers, and has a pyramid-shaped tiled roof. Around the church walls are a collection of gargoyles. In the 18th century, the nave was rebuilt in banded brick and flint, and in the construction of the north porch a doorway from the 12th or 13th century was reused.

== Status ==
The church was declared redundant on 1 October 1984, and was vested in the Churches Conservation Trust on 26 March 1986. An annual service is held.

== Interior ==
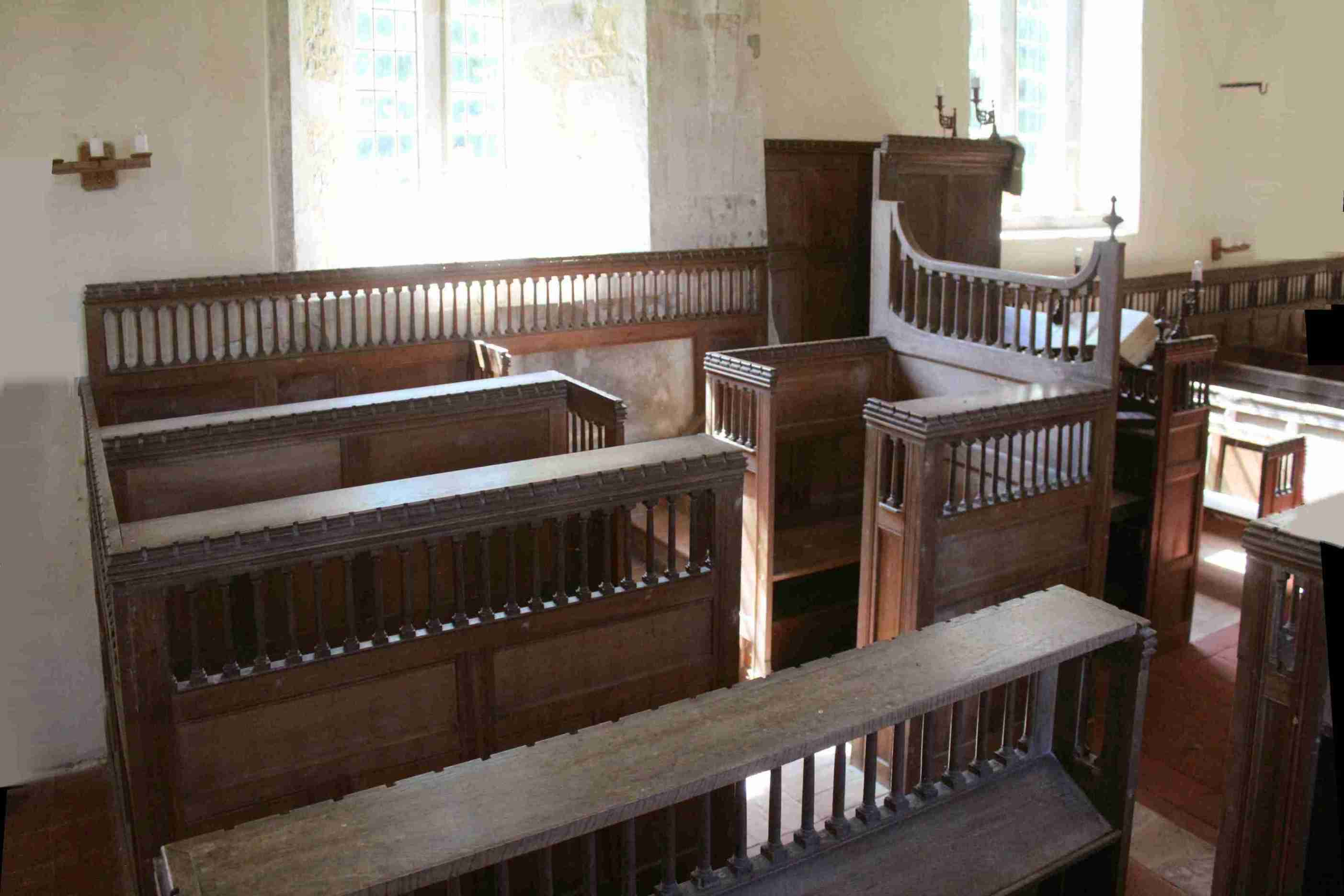
Small box pews at the east end of the nave

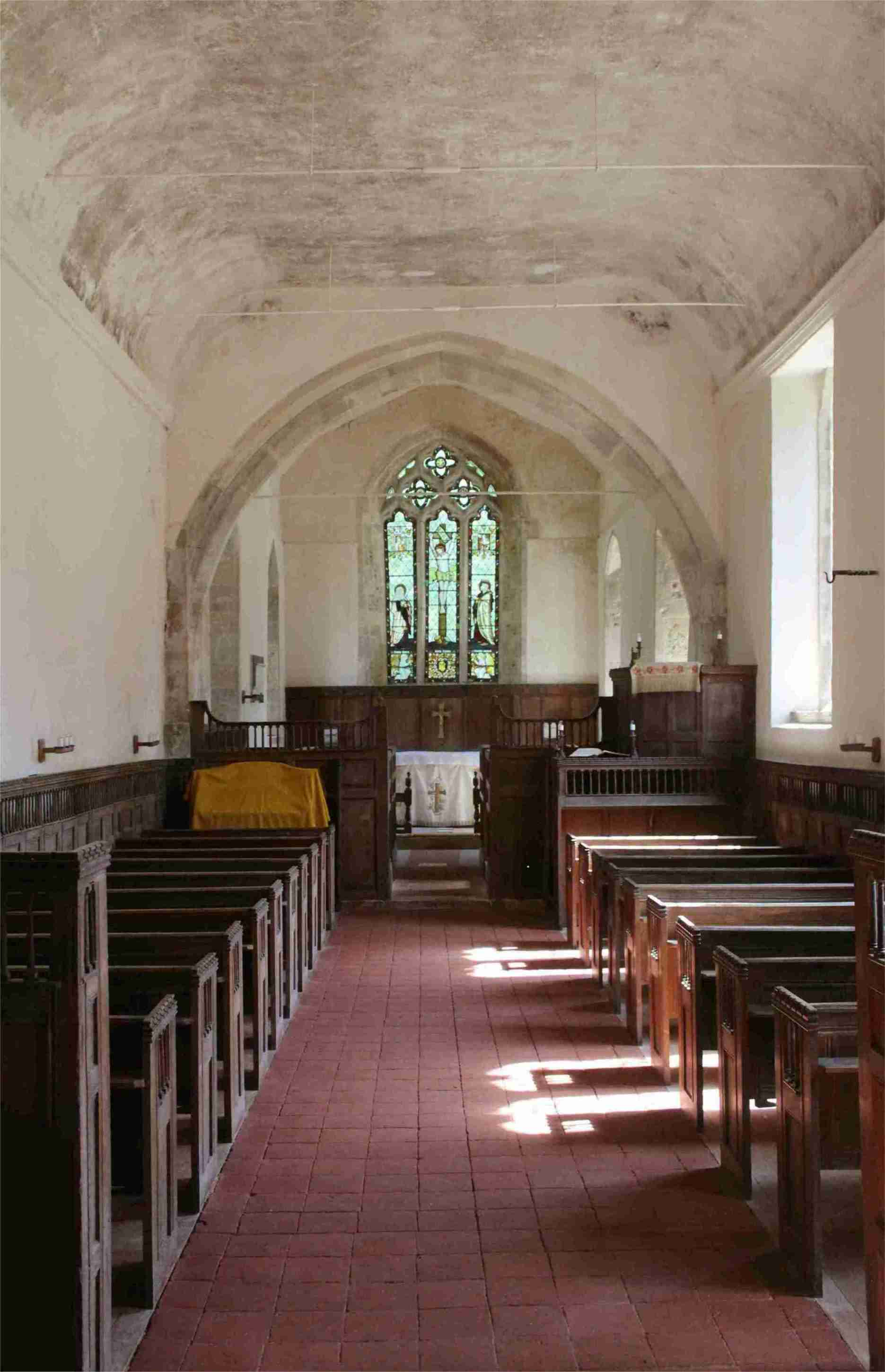
Looking east

The church has a cylindrical stone font from the 12th or 13th century, and a fine piscina in Purbeck stone from the mid-13th century.

The stalls and pews – including box pews with colonnaded tops – are from the 17th century; some alterations are from the re-ordering of 1882.

Memorials include a marble plaque to George Taunton and a wall tablet to Elizabeth Hill who died in 1715. The stained glass in the east window was installed by the studio of Charles Eamer Kempe in 1884.

In 2012 Loyd Grossman, who is the chairman of the Churches Conservation Trust, visited the church and presented certificates to local school children who had researched the history of the church.

== Churchyard ==
There is a large Yew tree in the churchyard with a girth of over 11 feet (3.4 m).

Among the graves and tombs in the churchyard is a chest tomb to Anthony Bradbury who died in 1845.

== Former parish ==
The benefice was united with neighbouring Bishopstone in 1925, with the incumbent to live at Bishopstone, although the parishes remained distinct. Later that year, outlying portions of the parish were transferred to the parishes in which they lay, namely Coombe Bissett, Homington and Britford. A group ministry was established for the Ebble valley in 1972, and today the area is part of the Chalke Valley Churches benefice.

== See also ==
- List of churches preserved by the Churches Conservation Trust in Southwest England
