= Church of St Francis, Stawell =

Church in Somerset, England

St Francis's Church
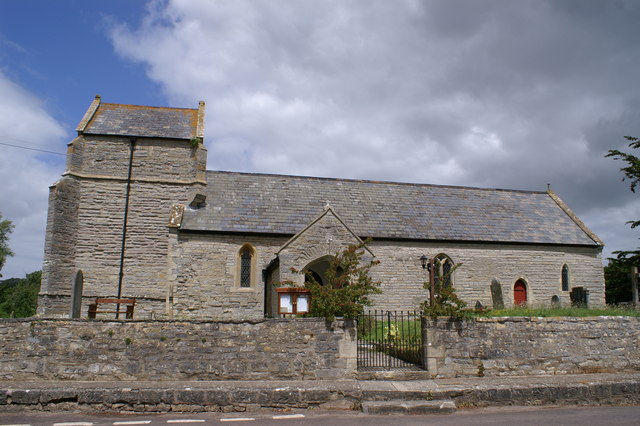

- Location within Somerset
- 51.1404°N 2.9047°W -->
- Location: Stawell, Somerset, England

History
- Built: 13th century

Listed Building – Grade II*
- Official name: Stawell Church
- Designated: 29 March 1963
- Reference no.: 1174228

The Anglican Church of St Francis in Stawell, Somerset, England was built in the 13th century. It is a Grade II* listed building.

== History ==
Construction of the church started in the 13th century on the site of a chapel which had been controlled by Glastonbury Abbey. The remains of an arcade in the north aisle is believed to come from about 1300.

The fabric of the building was added to during the 14th and 15th centuries. It underwent Victorian restoration in 1874.

The parish of Moorlinch with Stanwell and Sutton Mallett is within the benefice of Middlezoy with Othery, Moorlinch and Greinton which is part of the Diocese of Bath and Wells.

== Architecture ==
The stone church has a two-bay nave and chancel with a short west tower. The tower is supported by diagonal buttresses.

Inside the church is an octagonal font from the 15th century.
