= Church of St Andrew, Holcombe =

Church in Somerset, England

Church of St Andrew
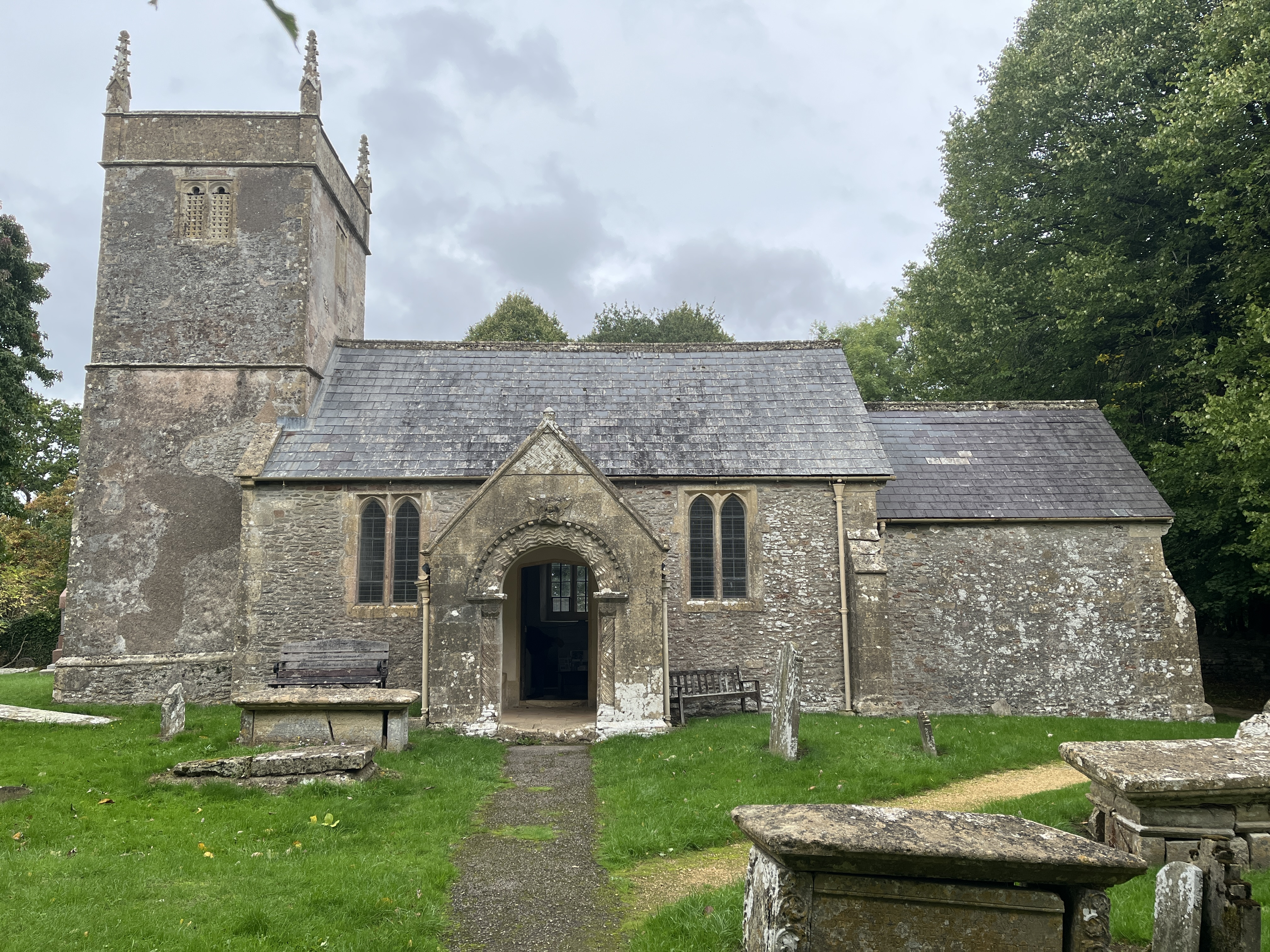

- Location within Somerset
- 51°15′17″N 2°28′34″W
- Location: Holcombe, Somerset, England

History
- Built: Late Saxon/Early Norman, rebuilt in 15th/16th centuries

Site notes
- Governing body: Churches Conservation Trust

Listed Building – Grade II*
- Official name: Church of St Andrew
- Designated: 2 June 1961
- Reference no.: 1058677

The Church of St Andrew (also known as St Andrew's Old Church and Holcombe Old Church) near Holcombe, Somerset, England has late Saxon-early Norman origins and was rebuilt in the 15th/16th centuries. It is recorded in the National Heritage List for England as a designated Grade II* listed building, and is a redundant church in the care of the Churches Conservation Trust. It was vested in the Trust on 1 August 1987. The village that the church served was deserted in the medieval period; the remains of the village can be seen adjacent to the church.

The church is known as St Andrew's Old Church as the new church built in 1884–1885 in the new settlement of Holcombe 1 mile to the south-east is also known as St Andrew's; St Andrew's Old Church has not been used for regular church services since that time, although it served as a cemetery chapel for its burial ground, which continued in use. The parish is part of the benefice of Coleford with Holcombe within the Midsomer Norton deanery.

== History ==
The church is late Saxon/early Norman in origin, rebuilt in the 15th/16th centuries and restored in the 19th century. It is built of random and coursed rubble stone, with some ashlar and stucco. The roofs are slate with moulded freestone ridges.

The south porch incorporates a recut Norman (12th century) arch, the east capital of which is carved from a reused block, possibly Roman, with a crudely carved, barely legible and incomplete inscription, which is presumed to be Saxon. The first line of the inscription might read '+ protr' or '+ wrotr'; this might refer to Hrotheweard, Archbishop of York who attended the Exeter Council of Easter 928, and it has been conjectured that he may have consecrated the church on his journey from or to the north. The second line of the inscription has an introductory cross and a possible Chi Rho (Christian symbol). Sally M. Foster of the University of Glasgow wrote of the inscription:

"...a fascinating inscription, tantalizingly incomplete... Its presence possibly exposes the existence of an early Christian church, and its significance, not least as the only possible Anglo-Saxon inscription in the county of Somerset, should not be overlooked."

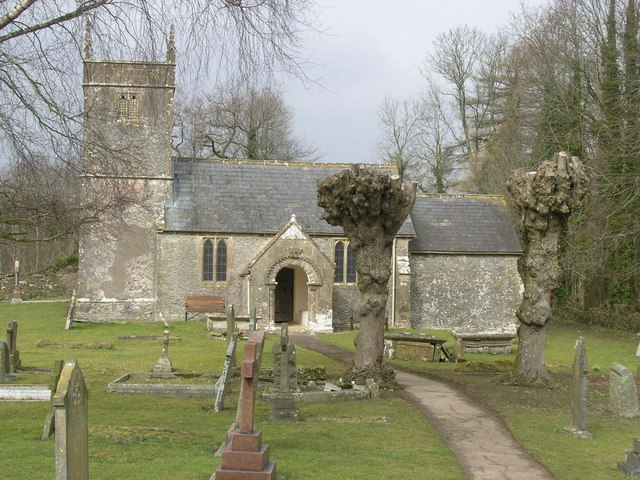
The Church of St Andrew, Holcombe.

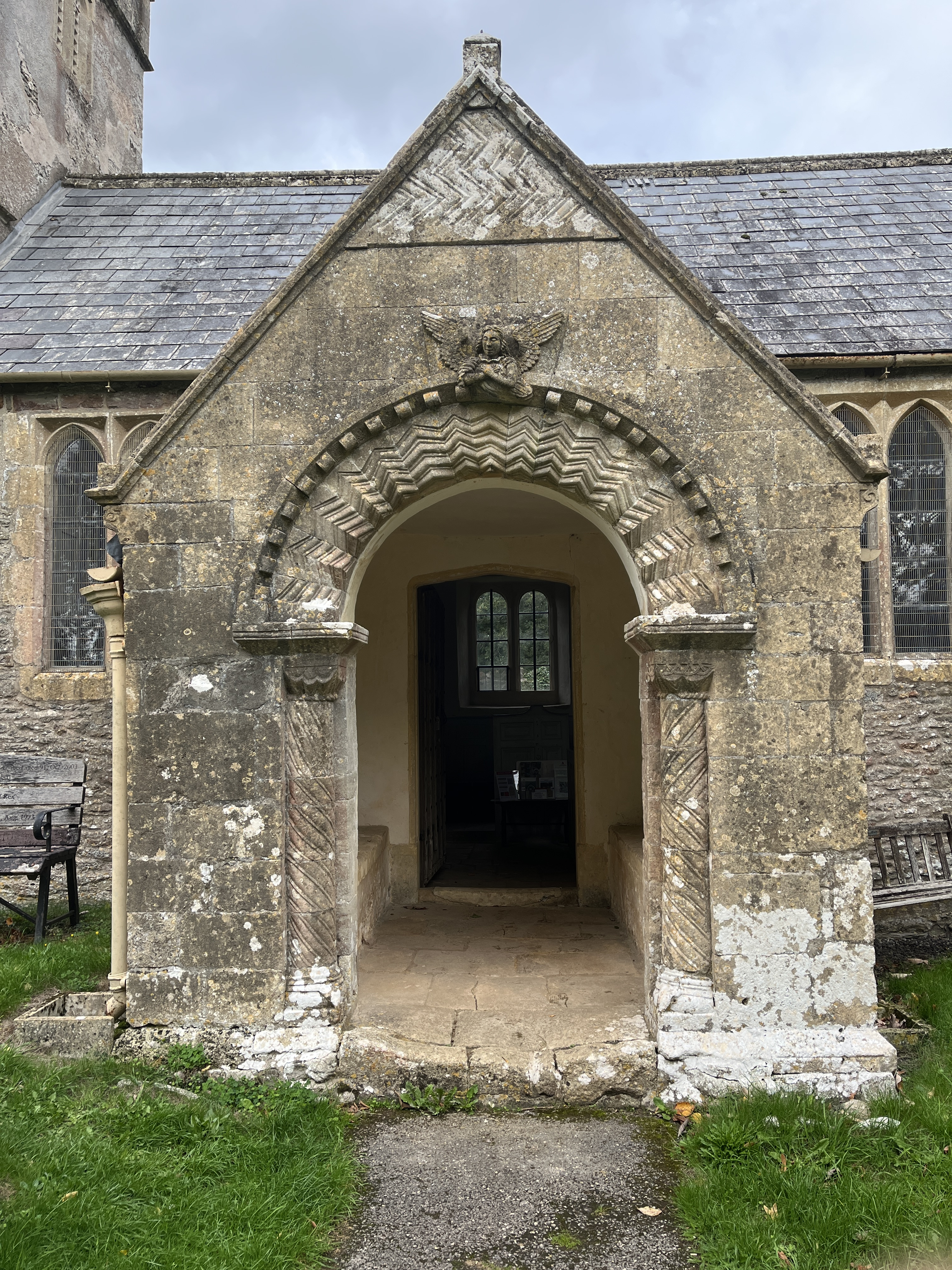
South porch of the Church of St Andrew, Holcombe, with carved angel and reused Norman arch

The south porch features a 16th-century carved angel over the arch, and the door is a fine medieval example.

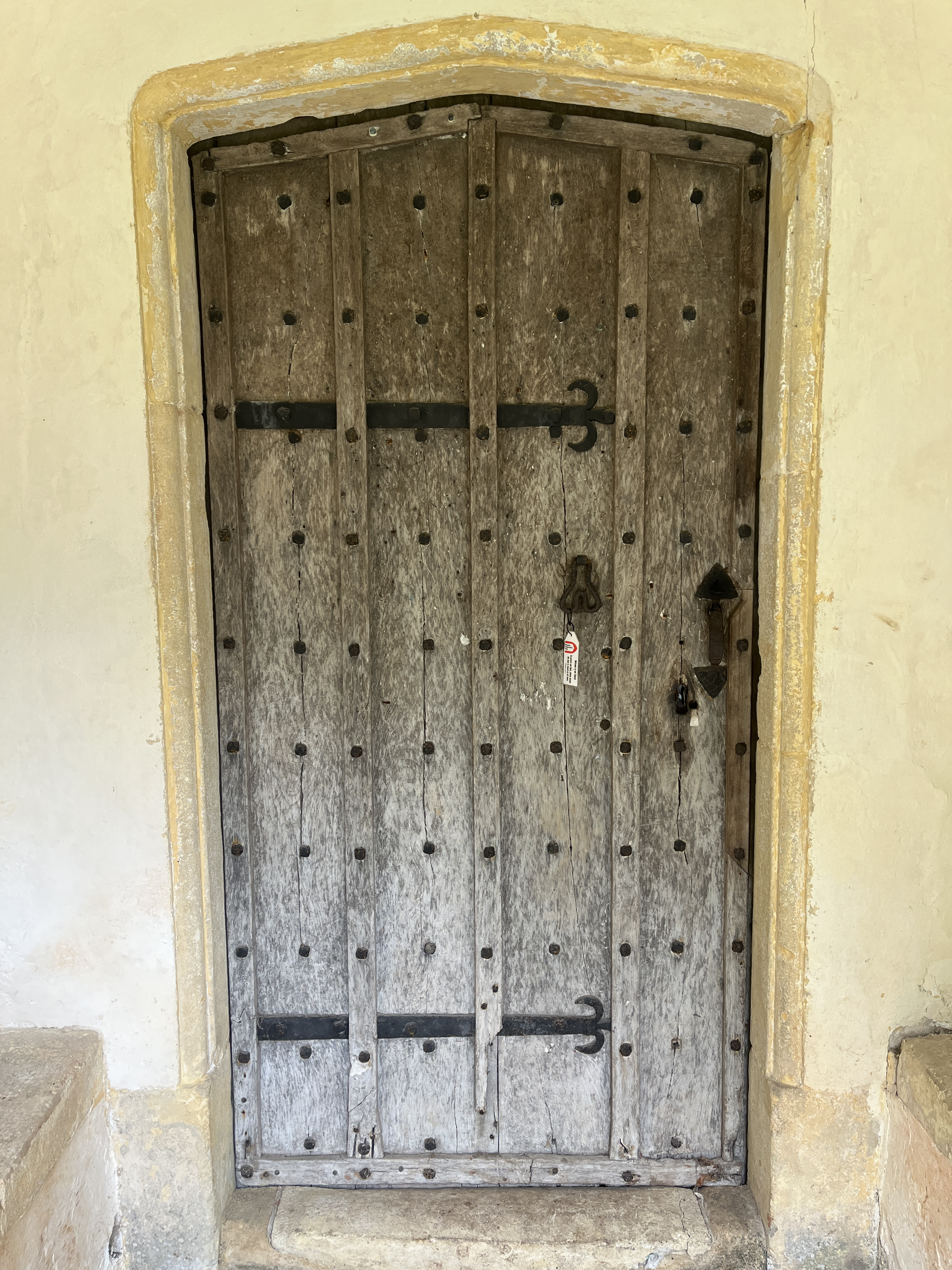
South door of the Church of St Andrew, Holcombe, viewed from the porch.

The chancel arch with simple mouldings is probably 13th century, and there is a plain Norman lancet in the north wall of the nave.

The church was rebuilt in the late 15th and 16th centuries. The tower at the west end of the church is in two stages, the upper part slightly set back from a narrow moulded string course.

"Somerset is renowned for the splendour of its pre-Reformation towers. Fine square towers with windows of vertical lines were developed in the Perpendicular style towards the end of the 15th century, following the Black Death which caused a shortage of skilled craftsmen for the earlier, more elaborated Decorated style. Though on a modest scale, Holcombe is in this evolving mode, with Shepton Mallet, late 15th century; Isle Abbotts, 1480; St Mary's Taunton, 1488 and Huish Episcopi, c. 1505." (Note: Several times in the pamphlet Raymond confuses her centuries: twice the 14th century is referred to when the context (discussing churches of the 1400s) clearly shows the 15th century is meant. Corrections have been made to the quoted text here to avoid confusion.)

== Interior ==
"The charming, unrestored interior has late-Georgian furnishings, neat and in good order, reflecting the quiet Hanoverian composure of its parishioners."

The church has a two-bay nave: simple late Georgian box pews on either side of the central aisle. The pews are deal and painted grey; there are wooden candlesticks mounted on some of the pews. The north wall has two rows of simple hat pegs for the men. The pulpit is originally Jacobean, remodelled into the late Georgian style and also painted grey. Reading desks flank the pulpit.

Over the chancel arch are the painted royal arms of George I, dated 1726, the year before he died. The chancel has a plain beamed roof, probably late Victorian or 20th century. Flanking the east window are panels with the Ten Commandments, and above it the Lord's Prayer and the Creed, all from 1817. Simple wooden pews flank the aisle, with a shallow step up to the sanctuary with its carved 19th-century oak altar and altar rails.

At the west end of the nave is the gallery, against the tower wall. It has a row of turned balusters, and is probably older than the box pews. The belfry has two bells, both cast in Bristol. The treble bell dates from c. 1425 and the tenor from about a century later.

The font was removed to the new St Andrews Church in Holcombe when it opened in 1885. The base of the font is an inverted font with traces of cable ornamentation, and is probably Norman; the upper shallow bowl is also of an early date. The church is paved throughout with stone flagstones.

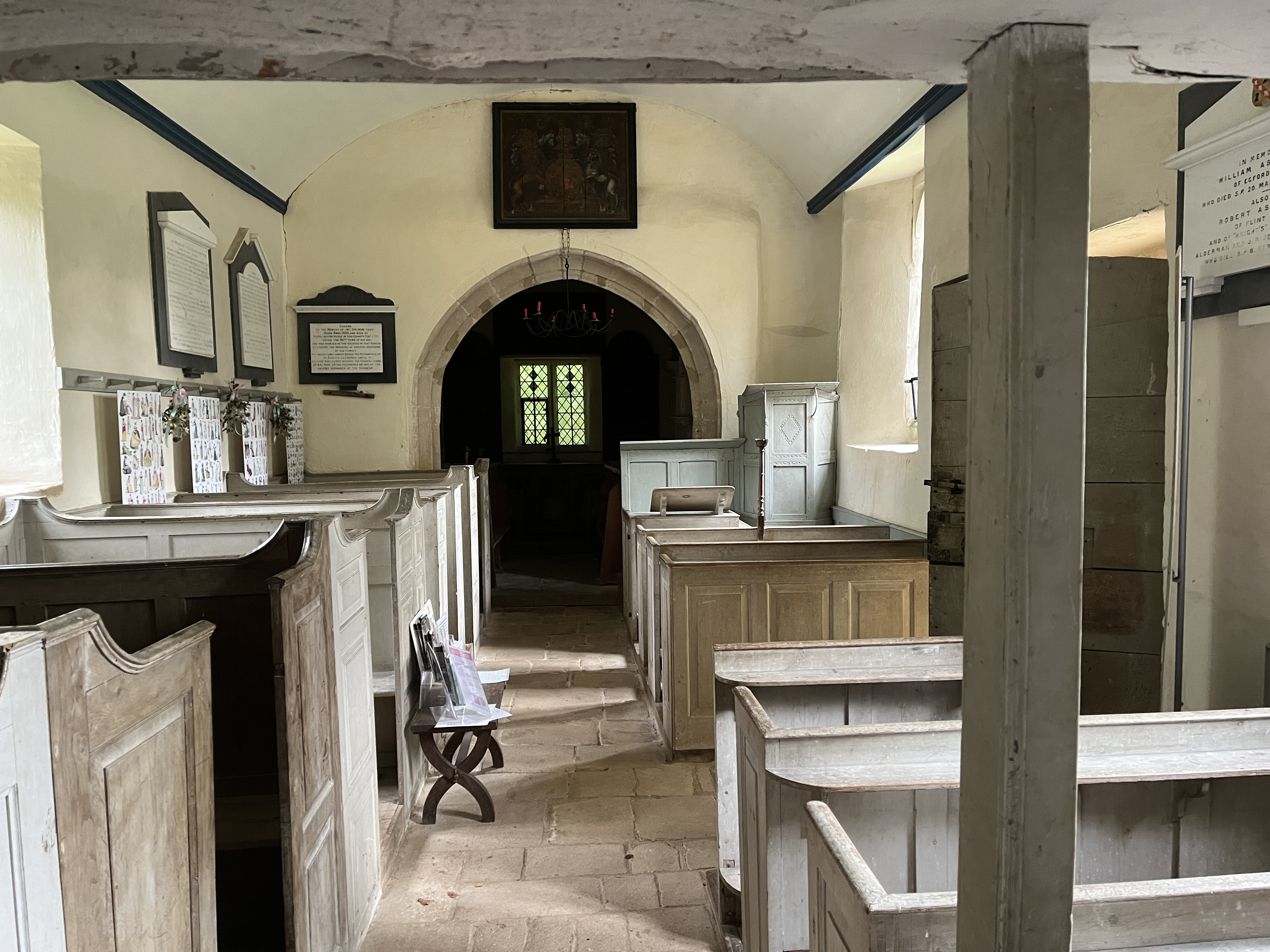
Interior of the Church of St Andrew, Holcombe, looking east to the chancel.

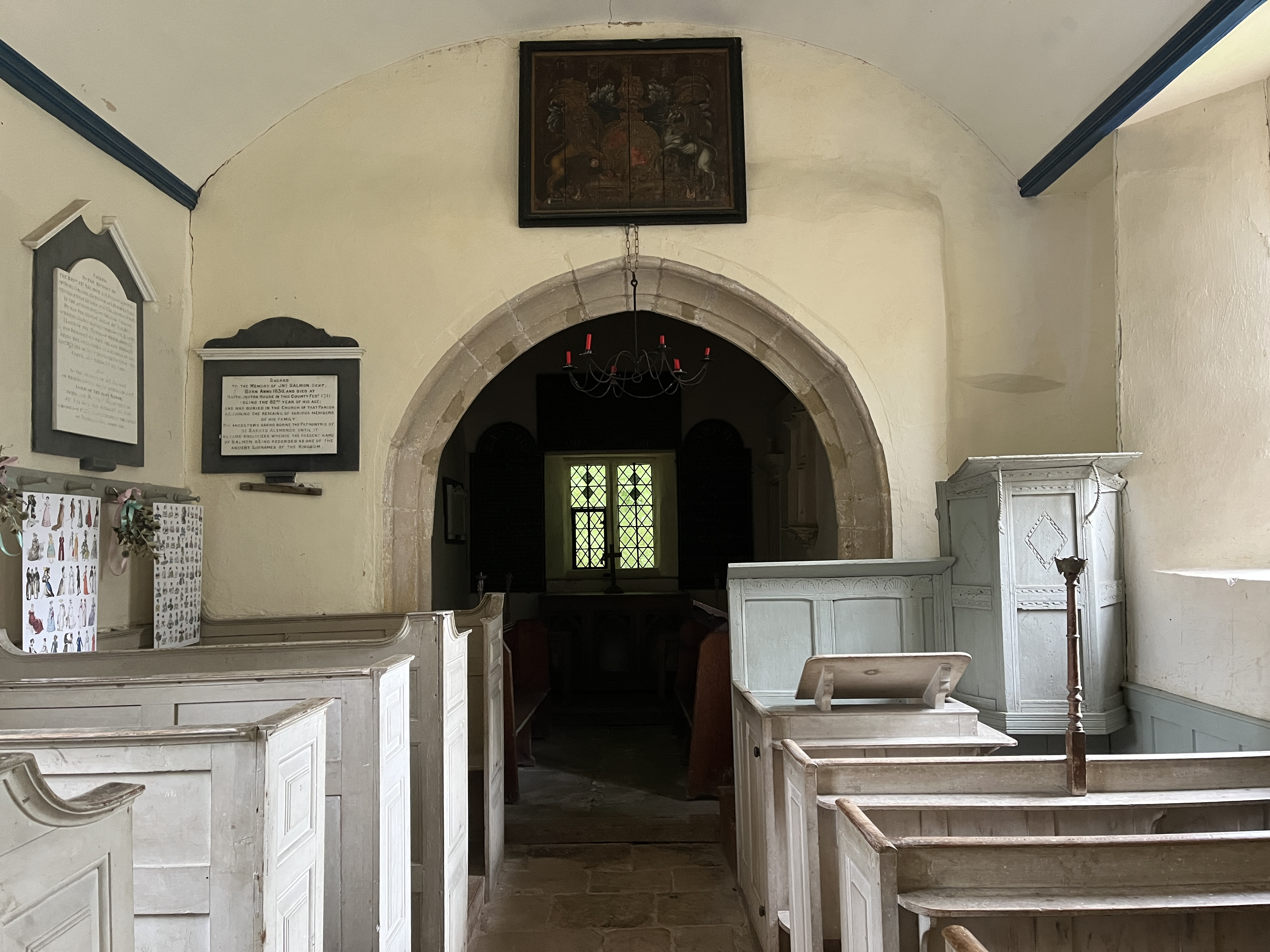
Interior of the Church of St Andrew, Holcombe, looking east to the chancel.

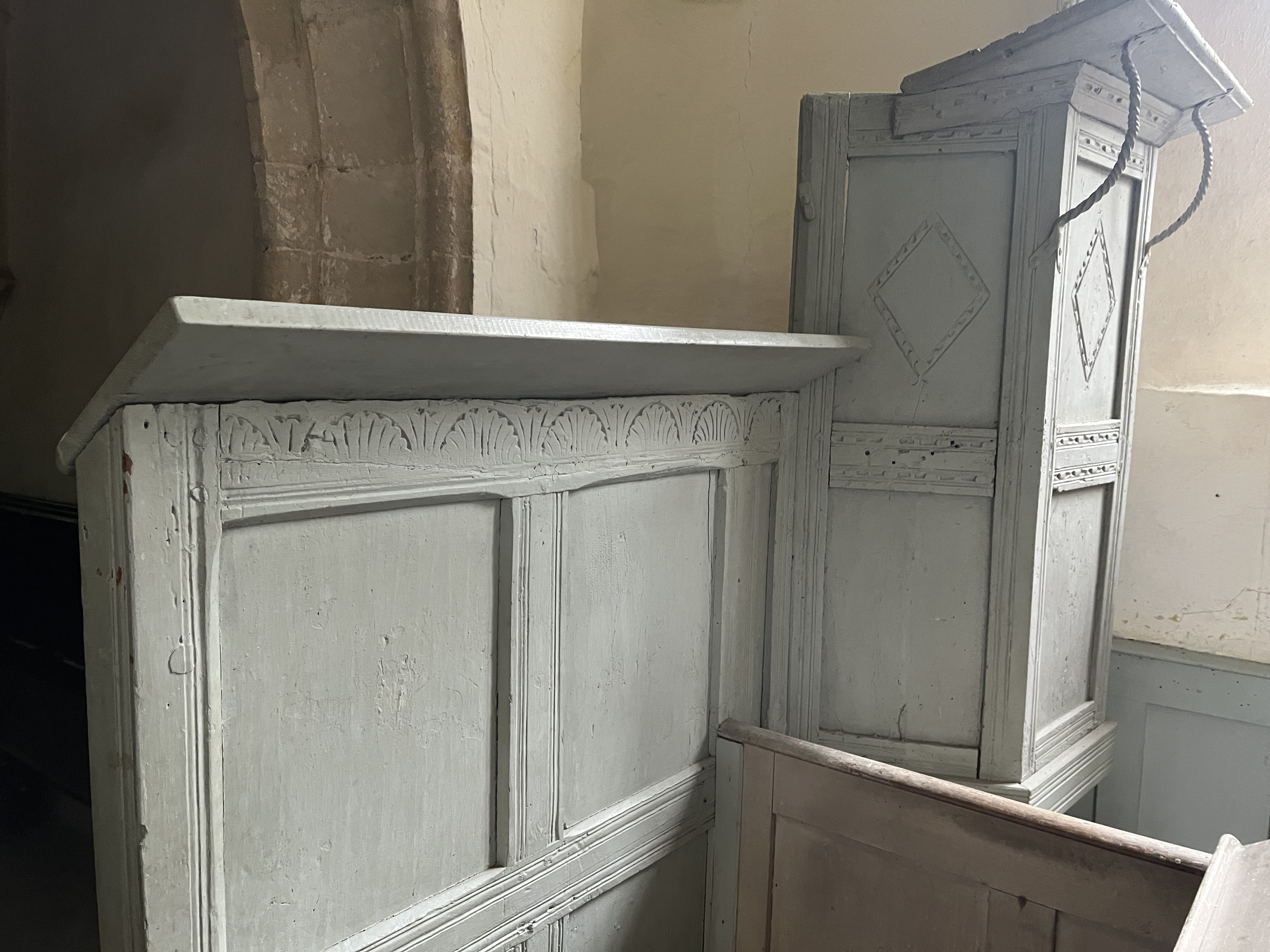
Pulpit in the Church of St Andrew, Holcombe.

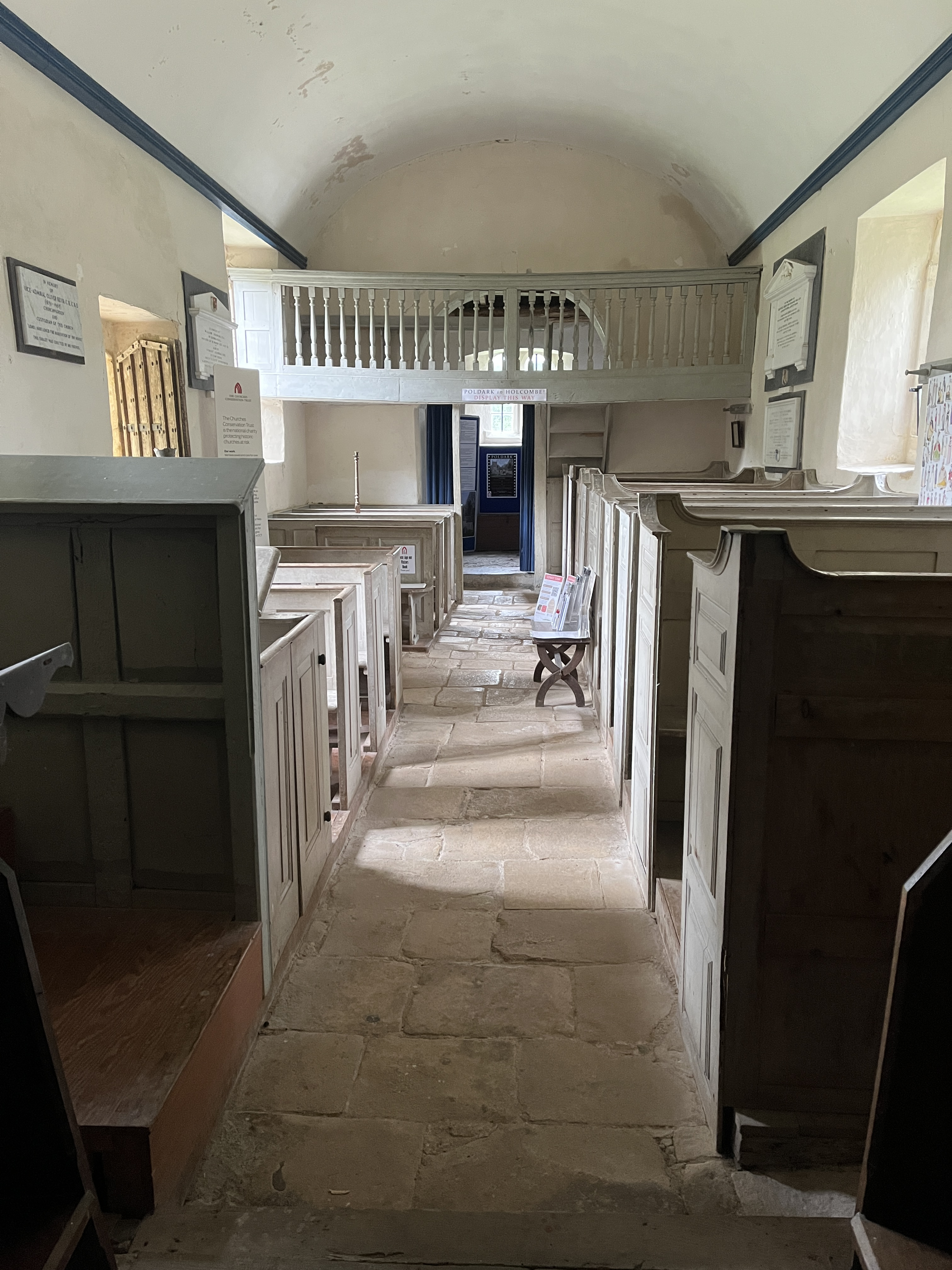
Interior of the Church of St Andrew, Holcombe, looking west to the gallery and tower.

== Churchyard and the Scott family grave ==
The yew tree in the churchyard is thought to be about 1500 years old.

The churchyard has some fine table tombs. One grave memorialises five children from the village who drowned in an icy pond in 1899. There are two Commonwealth War Graves in the churchyard.

In the north side of the churchyard, close to the church, is the family grave of the Scott family. The mother, father and brother of Antarctic explorer Robert Falcon Scott are buried here. Scott is buried where he died, near the South Pole, but a memorial inscription was added to the family grave:

ROBERT FALCON SCOTT C.V.O. / CAPTAIN ROYAL NAVY / SON OF THE ABOVE / WHO IN RETURNING FROM THE SOUTH POLE WITH / HIS COMPANIONS WAS TRANSLATED BY A / GLORIOUS DEATH MARCH 1912

RF Scott's father was the last manager of the Holcombe Brewery; his parents lived in Holcombe House (now called Holcombe Manor House) in the village.

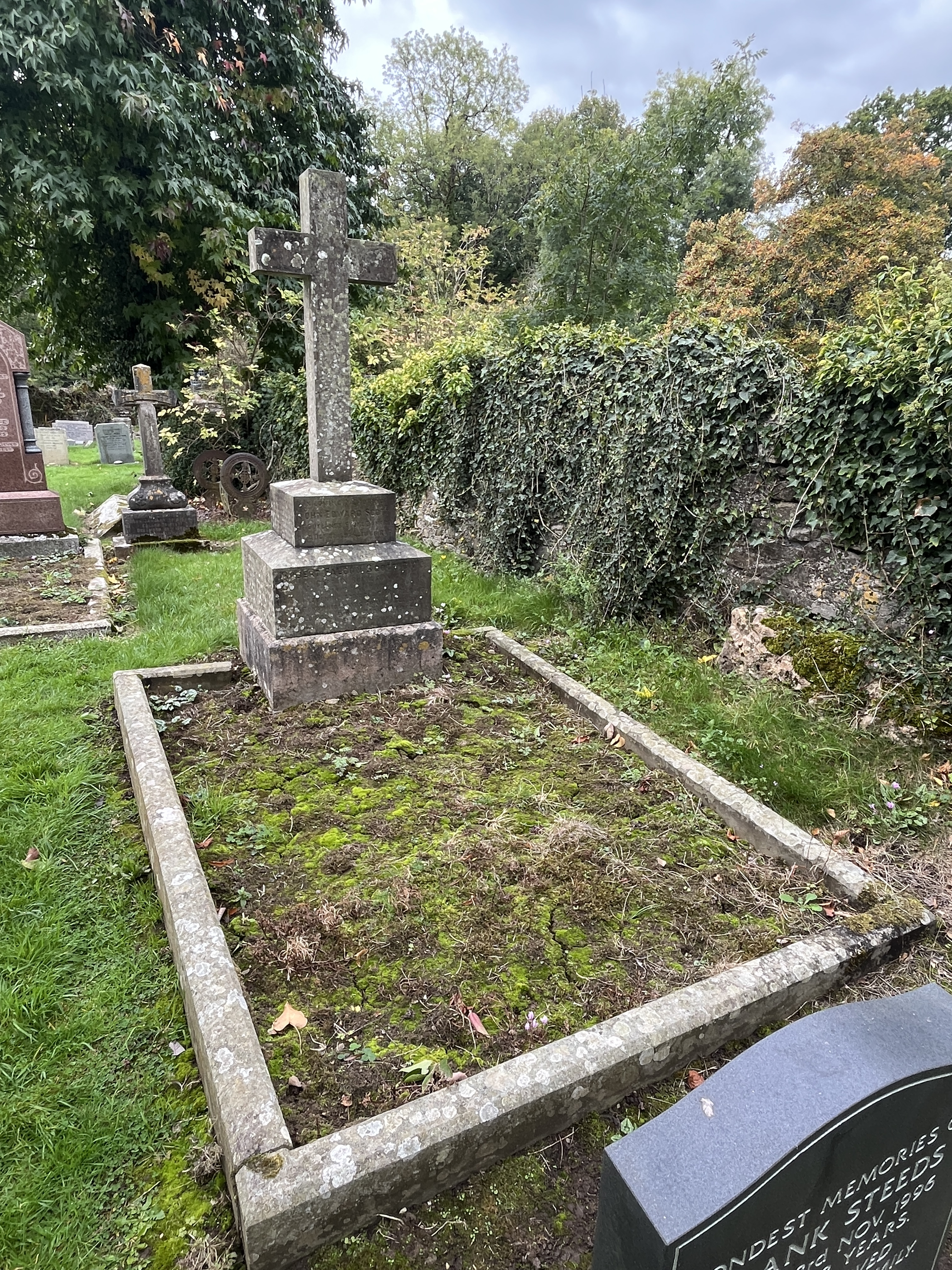
Scott family grave in the churchyard of the Church of St Andrew, Holcombe.

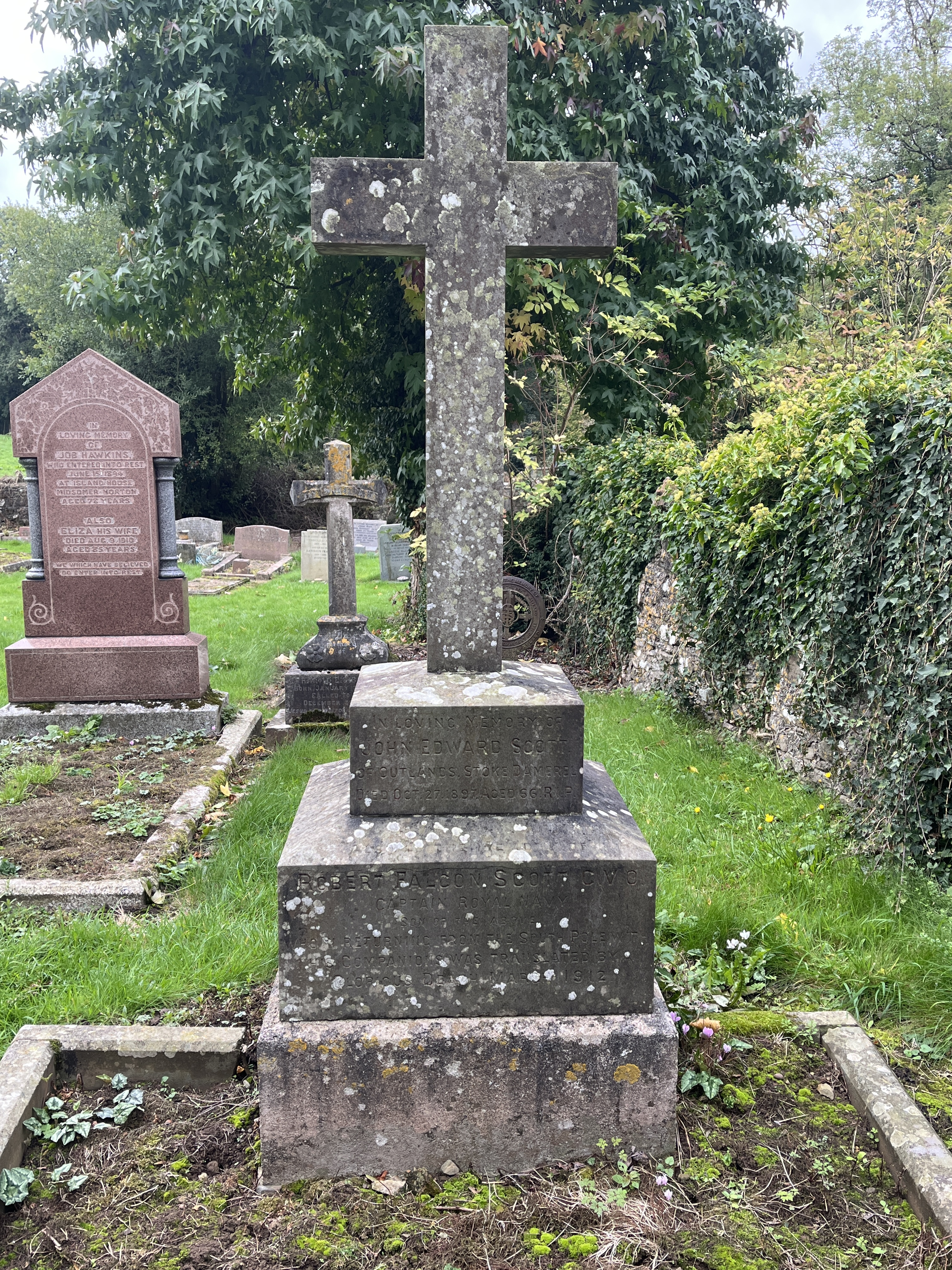
Scott family grave in the churchyard of the Church of St Andrew, Holcombe.

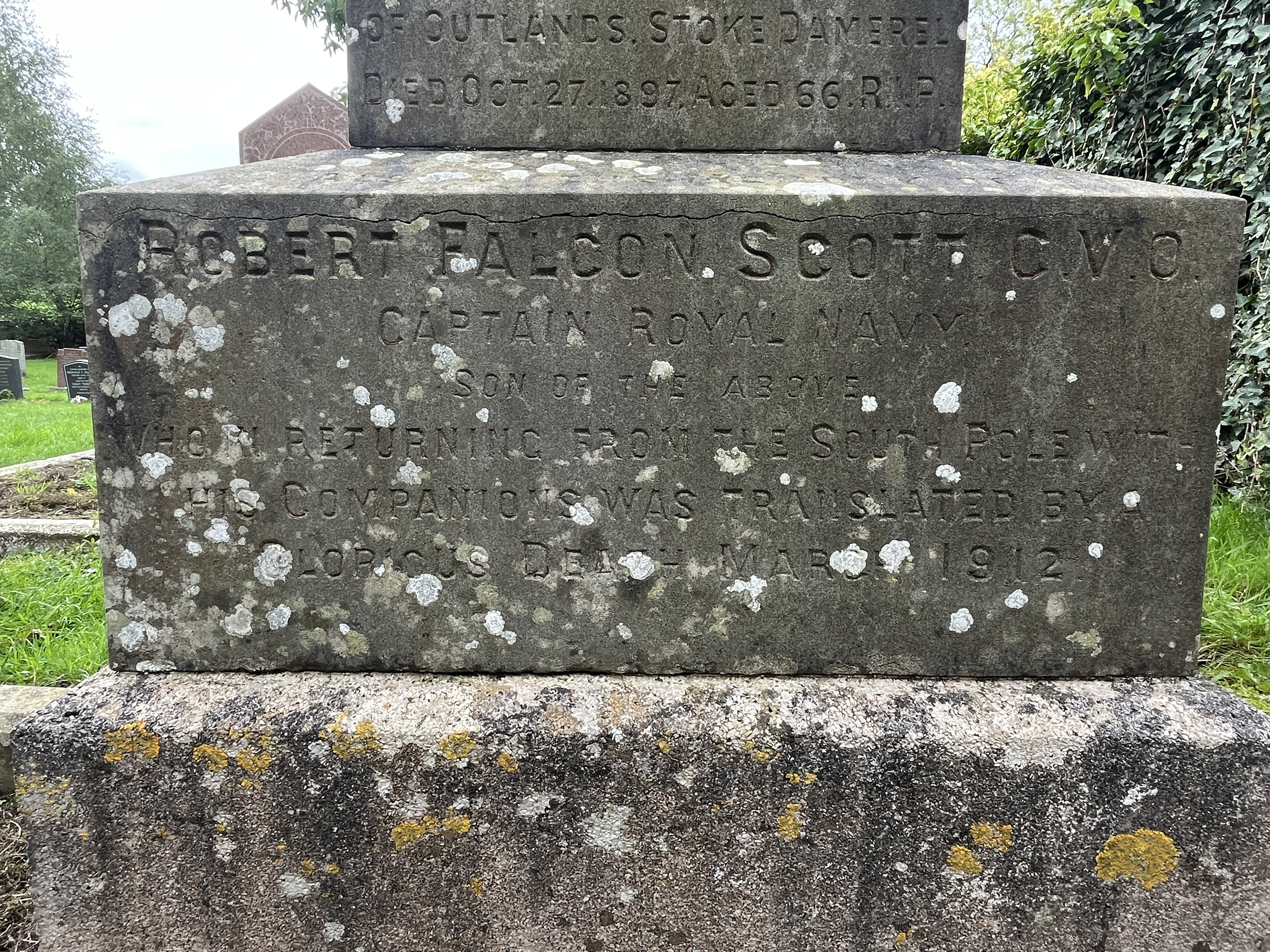
Memorial inscription for Robert Falcon Scott on the Scott family grave in the churchyard of the Church of St Andrew, Holcombe.

The churchyard has been extended several times, most recently to the north in c. 2000. Although Old St Andrews is no longer regularly used for services, the churchyard is still in use as a burial ground.

== Current use ==
The church is open at weekends by volunteers between 10–4 in the summer and 10–3 in the winter. Although the church is not used for regular services, some special services are held there, such as three summer Evensongs and the annual carol service. The Revd Clarissa Cridland (Associate Priest, Coleford with Holcombe) mentioned in a 2017 letter to the Church Times that she had recently had the church licensed for marriages.

== Filming location ==
The church's largely unrestored interior and lack of electricity and associated light and fittings led to it featuring as a filming location the 2015–2019 BBC television period drama series Poldark, in which the church was used for the parish church of the fictional Cornish village of Sawle. The church featured in series 3, 4 and 5 of the drama, in a total of 19 episodes. As part of the 'set dressing' for the production, a false wall was built in the churchyard to screen the modern graves, faux graves and gravestones were erected, and some of the pews were temporarily removed from the chancel. An exhibition about the filming of Poldark at Old St Andrews, Holcombe, ran at the church from 2 August to 30 September 2025.

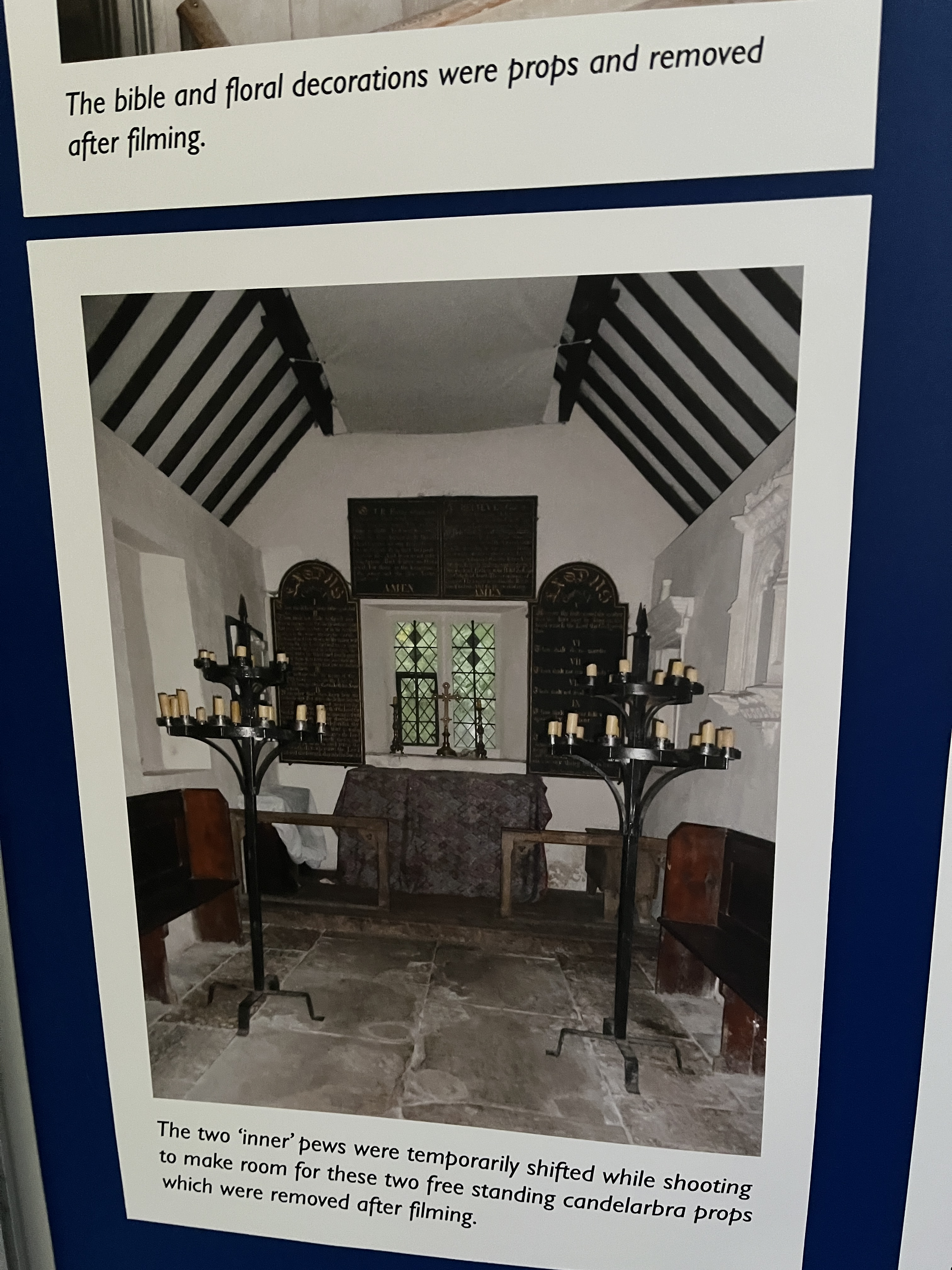
Church of St Andrew, Holcombe, exhibition about the filming of 2015–2019 Poldark tv series showing the remodelled chancel.

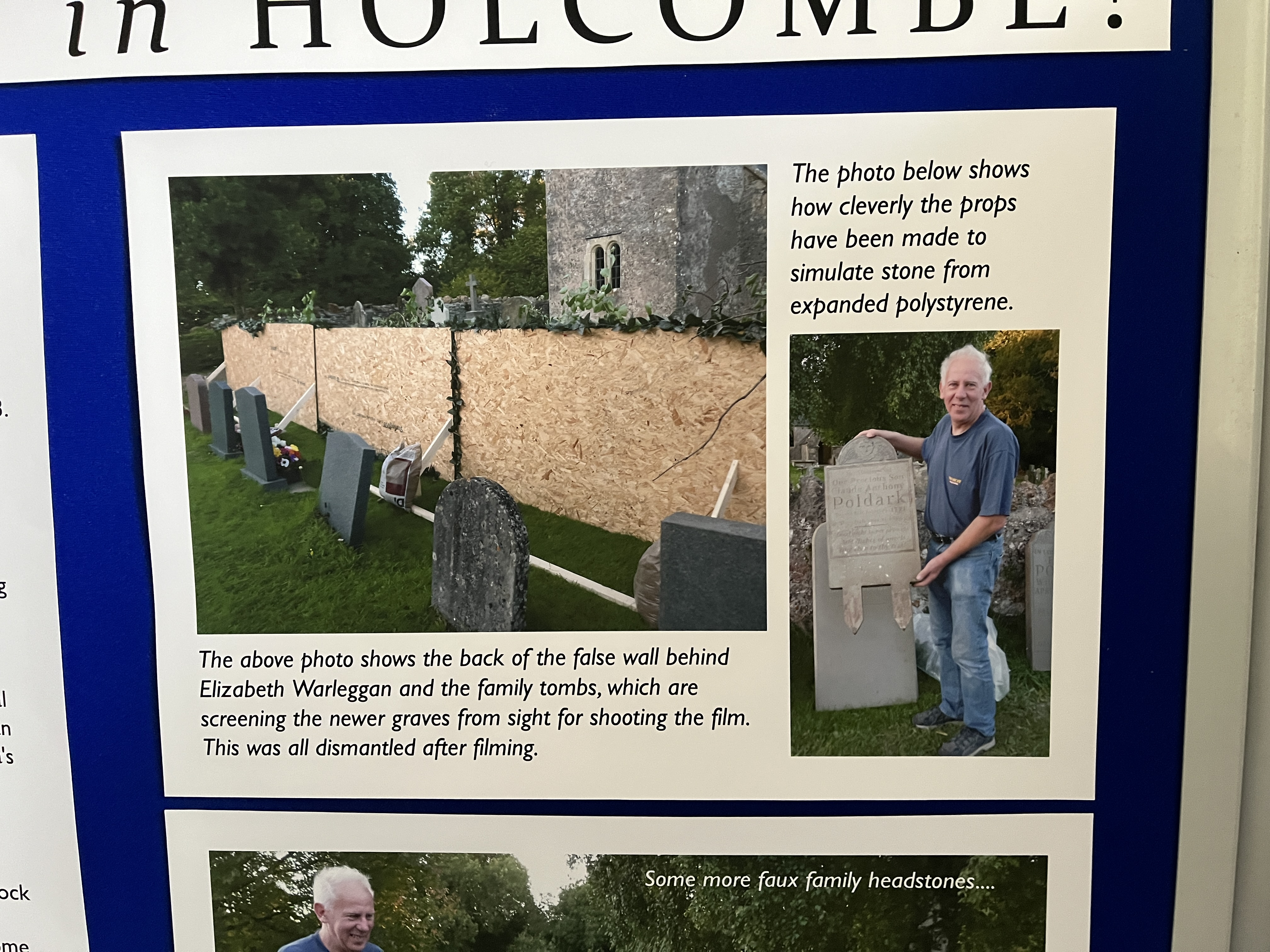
Church of St Andrew, Holcombe, exhibition about the filming of 2015–2019 Poldark tv series showing the false churchyard wall.

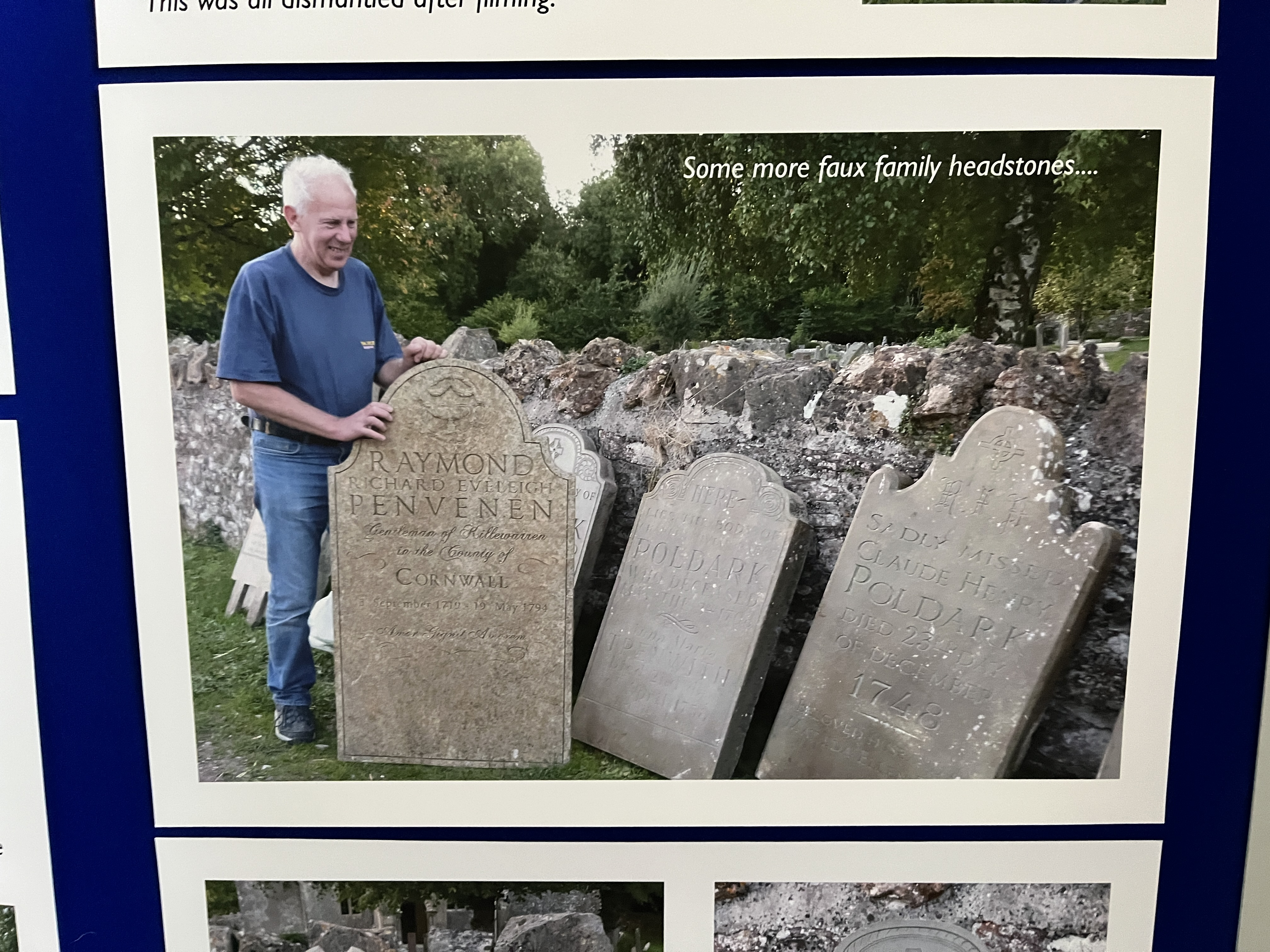
Church of St Andrew, Holcombe, exhibition about the filming of 2015–2019 Poldark tv series showing the false Poldark family gravestones.

== Local area ==
The church is now in an isolated rural position. It has been suggested that the surrounding village it once served, and the remains of which can be seen nearby the church, was decimated by the Black Death, which arrived in England in 1348, and that the surviving villagers set up a new settlement of Holcombe about a mile to the south-east. Approaching the church from the south, the field to the left of the gate has a rough, uncultivated mound. Local legend has it that this is the burial site of victims of the Plague; locals refer to the church as 'the plague church'.

The nearby imposing Downside Abbey was completed in 1876. Its Benedictine community first arrived in the area in 1814, settling in a manor house called Mount Pleasant. Downside is a Catholic (Benedictine) religious establishment and so of no connection to the by-then Church of England parish church of St Andrew.

== See also ==
- List of churches preserved by the Churches Conservation Trust in Southwest England
- List of ecclesiastical parishes in the Diocese of Bath and Wells
