= St Thomas à Becket Church, Pensford =

Church in Somerset, England

St Thomas à Becket Church
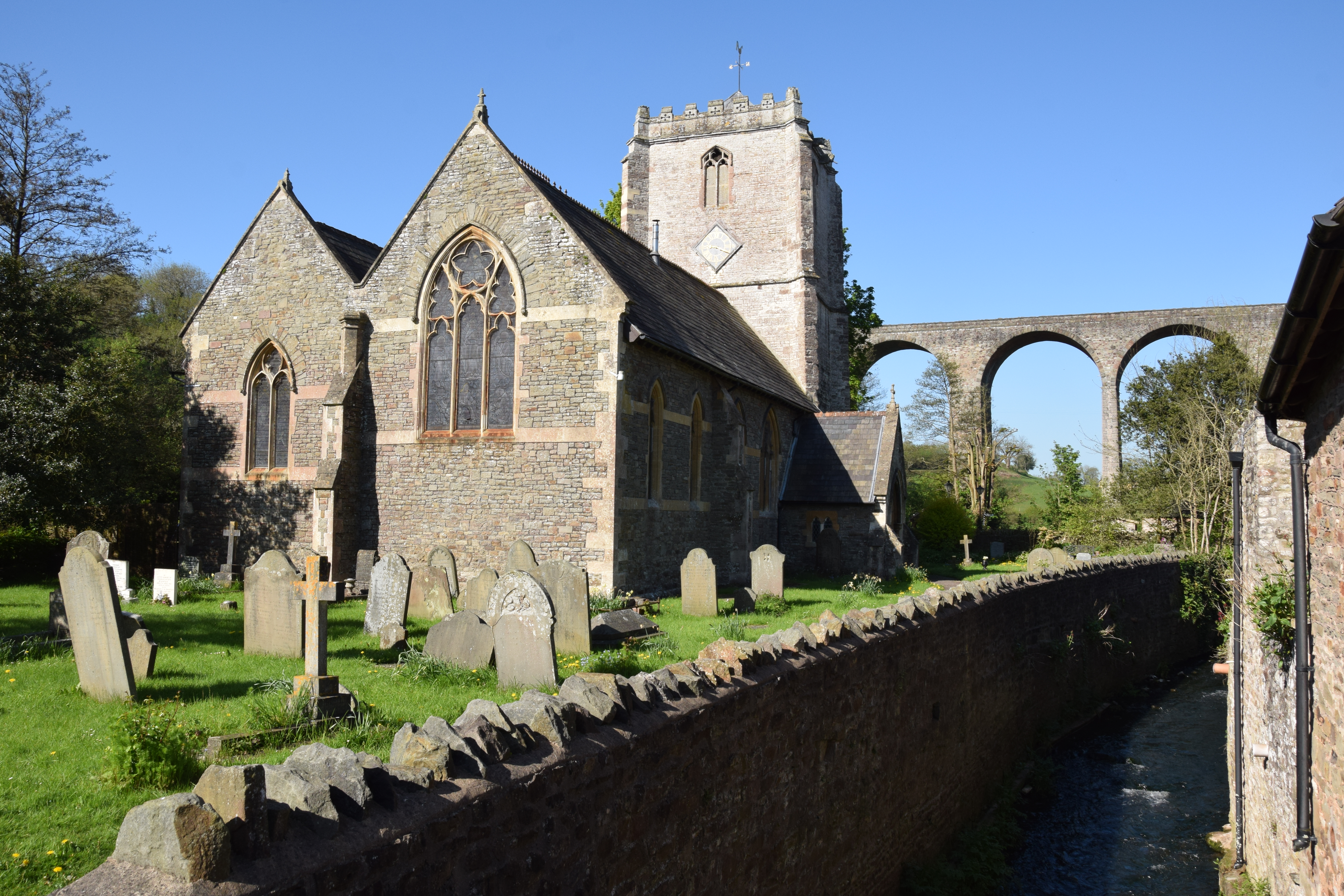

- Location within Somerset

General information
- Location: Pensford, England
- Coordinates: 51.371025°N 2.549796°W
- Construction started: 14th century

St Thomas à Becket Church in Pensford, Somerset in southwest England, dates from the 14th century and was active in 1341, although only the tower remains from that date, the rest of the church having been rebuilt in 1868 by Giles and Robinson Architects. The church was reconsecrated in 1869.

The church became derelict as a result of flood damage caused by the River Chew in 1968. It remained in disuse until 2008.

The west tower and tierceron vault date from the 14th century. The west doorway with a two-centred arch, dates back to the 15th century, and the font which has quatrefoils and roses, is of similar age. The rest of the church was rebuilt in 1869, by Charles Edmund Giles of Taunton.

It is recorded in the National Heritage List for England as a designated Grade II* listed building, and was on the English Heritage Buildings at Risk Register, following damage in a flood in 1968. The church was declared redundant on 30 July 1971, and the tower is in the care of the Churches Conservation Trust.

During the 1980s an attempt was made to turn it into an arts centre but this was abandoned when the extent of the repairs required to make the building safe became clear. In 2007 the church was put on the market for redevelopment, and in 2008 purchased for repair and use as a private dwelling. The conversion was recorded for a documentary as the first episode of the BBC television programme Restoration Home, which also explored the history of the church.

== See also ==
- List of churches preserved by the Churches Conservation Trust in South West England
- List of ecclesiastical parishes in the Diocese of Bath and Wells

== Bibliography ==
- Durham, I. & M. (1991). Chew Magna and the Chew Valley in old photographs. Redcliffe Press. ISBN 1-872971-61-X.
- Janes, Rowland, ed. (1987). The Natural History of the Chew Valley. ISBN 0-9545125-2-9.
