= St Edwold's Church, Stockwood =

Church in Dorset, England

St Edwold's Church
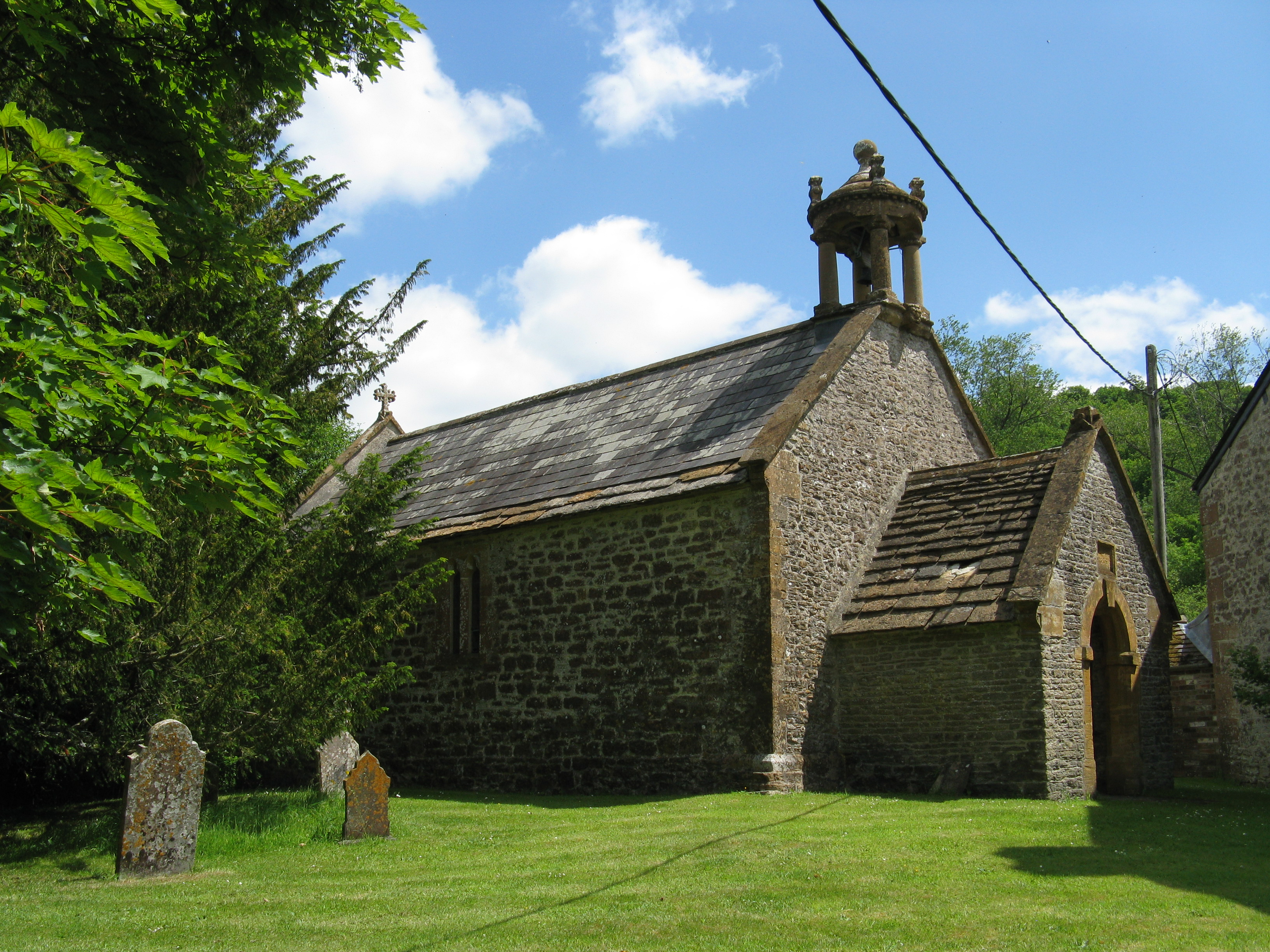

- Location within Dorset
- 50°51′37.3″N 2°35′01.2″W
- Location: Stockwood, Dorset, England

History
- Built: 15th century

Listed Building – Grade I
- Official name: Church of St Edwold
- Designated: 31 July 1961
- Reference no.: 1155008

St Edwold's Church in Stockwood, Dorset, England was rebuilt in the 15th century. It is recorded in the National Heritage List for England as a designated Grade I listed building, and is a redundant church in the care of the Churches Conservation Trust. It was declared redundant on 23 January 1959, and was vested in the Trust on 1 March 1972.

St Edwold's Church is often described as Dorset's smallest. The church sits next to a farmhouse directly under the wooded heights of Bubb Down. It is a single-celled building. The porch has the date "1636" inscribed, reflecting the fact that the church was rebuilt to some extent in the seventeenth century when a bell turret was also installed. However, John Newman and Nikolaus Pevsner in their Buildings of England volume describe it as "Perp, with Henry VIII side windows and a three-light E window with panel tracery," and also refer to the "delightfully naive bell-turret, round, with a cap on four stumpy columns and a big grotesque face." A Piscina is mounted on the outside south wall probably as a result of a Victorian restoration.

Inside, the church is very plainly furnished. The dedication to St Edwold (9th century) is unique in Dorset. Edwold was the brother of St Edmund the Martyr, King of East Anglia, and he lived as a recluse at nearby Cerne after his sibling's death. It is not entirely clear why Stockwood church is dedicated to Edwold, but Kenneth Smith's guidebook suggests that he may have also had a cell here as well as at Cerne.

== See also ==
- List of churches preserved by the Churches Conservation Trust in South West England
