= Sutton Mallet Church =

Church in Somerset, England

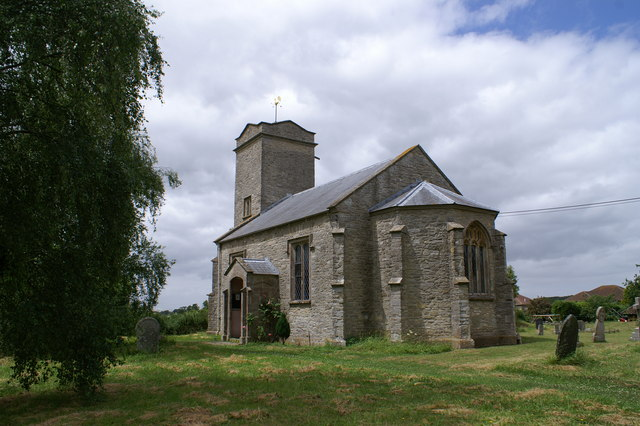

- Location within Somerset
- 51°07′42″N 2°53′52″W
- Location: Sutton Mallet, Stawell, Somerset, England

History
- Built: 1827-1829

Site notes
- Architect: Richard Carver
- Architectural style: Georgian
- Governing body: Churches Conservation Trust

Listed Building – Grade II
- Official name: Sutton Mallet Church
- Designated: 29 March 1963
- Reference no.: 1174207

Sutton Mallet Church in the village of Sutton Mallet, which is within the parish of Stawell, Somerset, England, was built in 1827 incorporating elements of a 15th-century church on the site. It is recorded in the National Heritage List for England as a designated Grade II listed building.

The village is on Sedgemoor on the Somerset Levels, at the foot of the Polden Hills. The old church which dated from the mediaeval period provided a landmark for anyone crossing the moor. Deterioration of the fabric of the church had was reported in the 16th and 17th centuries and services were only held infrequently in the 18th and 19th.

The current church was built between 1827 and 1829 by Richard Carver of Taunton adjoining the old tower. Although the rebuilding was in a Georgian style remnants from the earlier church were reused including a mediaeval window which was incorporated into the small apse, and the 17th-century altar rails were reused.

The Gothic tower includes two 17th-century bells, one from 1607 by R. Purdue and another of 1657 by Robert Austen. When the church was rebuilt the tower was not adequately fixed to the rest of the church, meaning that, by 2008, 6 metres (20 ft) long diagonal stainless steel ties needed to be inserted to prevent further deterioration.

The church is now a redundant church in the care of the Churches Conservation Trust. It was vested in the Trust on 1 November 1987.

== See also ==
- List of churches preserved by the Churches Conservation Trust in South West England
