= St Andrew's Church, Winterborne Tomson =

Coordinates: 50.77627°N 2.16485°W

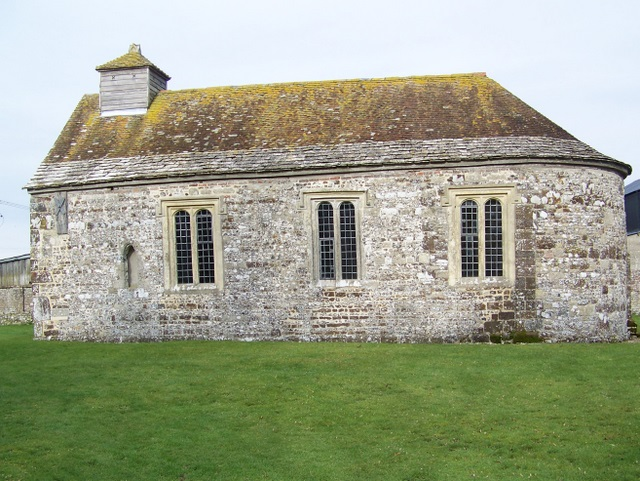
- St Andrew's Church, Winterborne Tomson, from the south

- Location in Dorset
- OS grid reference: SY 885 974
- Location: Winterborne Tomson, Dorset
- Country: England
- Denomination: Anglican
- Website: Churches Conservation Trust

Architecture
- Functional status: Redundant
- Heritage designation: Grade I
- Designated: 14 July 1955
- Architectural type: Church
- Style: Norman

Specifications
- Materials: Flint

St Andrew's Church in Winterborne Tomson, Dorset, England, was built in the 12th century. It is recorded in the National Heritage List for England as a designated Grade I listed building, and is a redundant church in the care of the Churches Conservation Trust. It was declared redundant on 1 June 1972, and was vested in the Trust on 26 March 1974.

The small flint and stone Norman Anglican Church of St Andrew has an apse at the east end and a barrel vault roof which curves around it. The roof was replaced and windows inserted in the 16th century. The oak door is heavily studded. The interior has limewashed walls, a 15th-century font and flag stone floor, along with early 18th-century oak fittings. The eighteenth century oak pews, the pulpit, screen, communion rails and matching table with barley sugar turned legs, and other woodwork were provided by William Wake, Archbishop of Canterbury, who had been raised in the village of Shapwick and whose family lived locally. The west end has a late medieval gallery with a panelled front which was probably originally a rood screen. The roof is topped by a small weatherboard belfry which resembles a dovecote.

By the early 20th century, the church had fallen into disrepair and was being used as an animal shelter by a local farmer. Repairs were paid for by the Society for the Protection of Ancient Buildings who sold a collection of Thomas Hardy’s manuscripts to raise the funding. The work was supervised by A. R. Powys who also oversaw the work at the Old St Cuthbert's Church, Oborne.

== See also ==
- List of churches preserved by the Churches Conservation Trust in South West England
