= Elworthy =

Village and civil parish in Somerset, England

Coordinates: 51.1064°N 3.3101°W

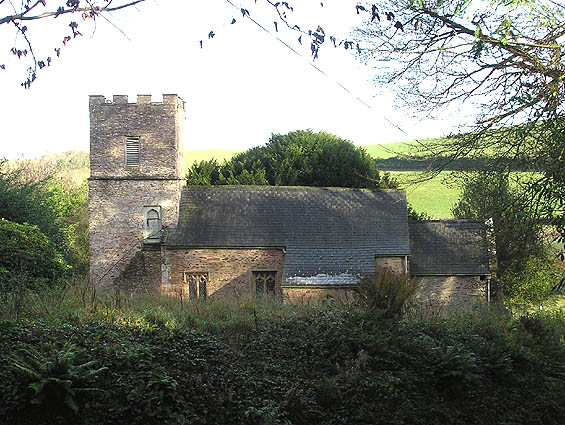
- Church of St Martin, Elworthy

- Location within Somerset
- Population: 103
- OS grid reference: ST083349
- Unitary authority: Somerset Council
- Ceremonial county: Somerset
- Region: South West
- Country: England
- Sovereign state: United Kingdom
- Post town: TAUNTON
- Postcode district: TA4
- Dialling code: 01483
- Police: Avon and Somerset
- Fire: Devon and Somerset
- Ambulance: South Western
- UK Parliament: Tiverton and Minehead

Elworthy is a small village and civil parish in the Brendon Hills 5 miles (8 km) south-east of Watchet, and 12 miles (19 km) west of Taunton, in Somerset, England. The parish includes the hamlet of Willett.

== History ==
On the Brendon Hills, about 1 mile (1.6 km) from the village, are the Elworthy Burroughs, a British encampment, and several tumuli.

The parish of Elworthy was part of the Williton and Freemanners Hundred.

Willett House was built around 1816 as a country house by Richard Carver (Architect) for Daniel Blommert. In the grounds is the Willett Tower a 15 metres (49.2 ft) high folly in the form of a ruined church tower. Its date of construction is uncertain but it was recorded in 1791 and is believed to have been built in 1774 with funds raised of £130 by public subscription.

== Governance ==
The parish council has responsibility for local issues, including setting an annual precept (local rate) to cover the council's operating costs and producing annual accounts for public scrutiny. The parish council evaluates local planning applications and works with the local police, district council officers, and neighbourhood watch groups on matters of crime, security, and traffic. The parish council's role also includes initiating projects for the maintenance and repair of parish facilities, as well as consulting with the district council on the maintenance, repair, and improvement of highways, drainage, footpaths, public transport, and street cleaning. Conservation matters (including trees and listed buildings) and environmental issues are also the responsibility of the council.

For local government purposes, since 1 April 2023, the parish comes under the unitary authority of Somerset Council. Prior to this, it was part of the non-metropolitan district of Somerset West and Taunton (formed on 1 April 2019) and, before this, the district of West Somerset (established under the Local Government Act 1972). It was part of Williton Rural District before 1974.

It is also part of the Tiverton and Minehead county constituency represented in the House of Commons of the Parliament of the United Kingdom. It elects one Member of Parliament (MP) by the first past the post system of election.

== Religious sites ==
The Church of St Martin, dedicated to St Martin of Tours, dates from the 13th century and has been designated by English Heritage as a Grade II* listed building. The church is in the care of the Churches Conservation Trust.

== Notable residents ==
Marshal of the Royal Air Force Samuel Charles Elworthy, Baron Elworthy KG GCB CBE DSO LVO DFC AFC (23 March 1911 – 4 April 1993) was a senior officer in the Royal Air Force and was made a life peer as Baron Elworthy, of Timaru in New Zealand and of Elworthy.
