= Stocklinch =

Village and civil parish in Somerset, England

Coordinates: 50.9536°N 2.8769°W

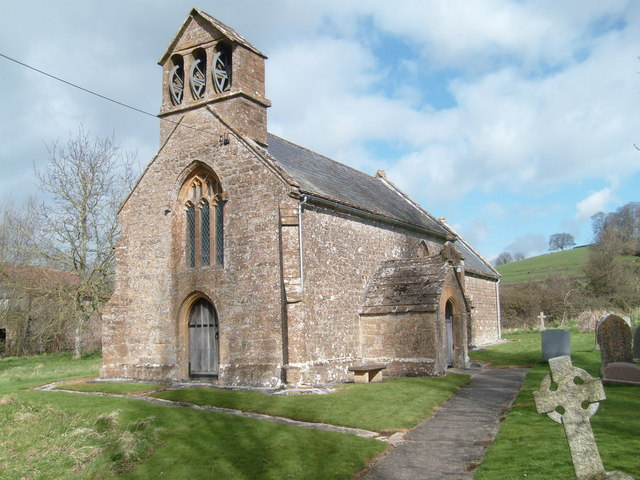
- St Mary Magdalene

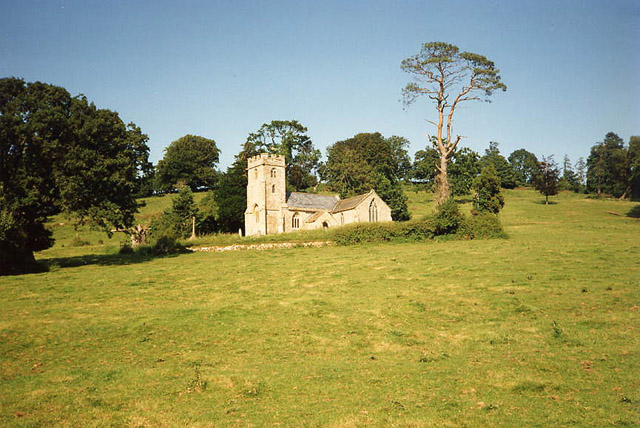
- Stocklinch Ottersey church

- Location within Somerset
- Population: 154 (2011)
- OS grid reference: ST385175
- Unitary authority: Somerset Council
- Ceremonial county: Somerset
- Region: South West
- Country: England
- Sovereign state: United Kingdom
- Post town: ILMINSTER
- Postcode district: TA19
- Dialling code: 01460
- Police: Avon and Somerset
- Fire: Devon and Somerset
- Ambulance: South Western
- UK Parliament: Yeovil

Stocklinch is a village and civil parish 3.5 miles (6 km) north-east of Ilminster in the county of Somerset, England.

== History ==
The village is one of Somerset's nine Thankful Villages (from a total of 52 villages in England and Wales), in which all the men who served in World War I came home, and one of only 14 doubly thankful villages in the country as it also did not lose any soldiers in World War II. The village is featured on Darren Hayman's album, Thankful Villages Volume 1.

== Governance ==
The parish council has responsibility for local issues, including setting an annual precept (local rate) to cover the council's operating costs and producing annual accounts for public scrutiny. The parish council evaluates local planning applications and works with the local police, district council officers, and neighbourhood watch groups on matters of crime, security, and traffic. The parish council's role also includes initiating projects for the maintenance and repair of parish facilities, as well as consulting with the district council on the maintenance, repair, and improvement of highways, drainage, footpaths, public transport, and street cleaning. Conservation matters (including trees and listed buildings) and environmental issues are also the responsibility of the council.

For local government purposes, since 1 April 2023, the parish comes under the unitary authority of Somerset Council. Prior to this, it was part of the non-metropolitan district of South Somerset (established under the Local Government Act 1972). It was part of Chard Rural District before 1974.

It is also part of the Yeovil county constituency represented in the House of Commons of the Parliament of the United Kingdom. It elects one member of parliament by the first past the post system of election.

== Religious sites ==
The Church of St Mary Magdalene dates from the 13th century and has been designated by English Heritage as a Grade I listed building, while the Church of St Mary the Virgin, which is of the same vintage, is Grade II* listed. In 1931 the two parishes they served, Stocklinch Ottersey and Stocklinch Magdalen, were combined into one parish.
