= Church of St Mary Magdalene, Stocklinch =

Church in Somerset, England

Church of St Mary Magdalen
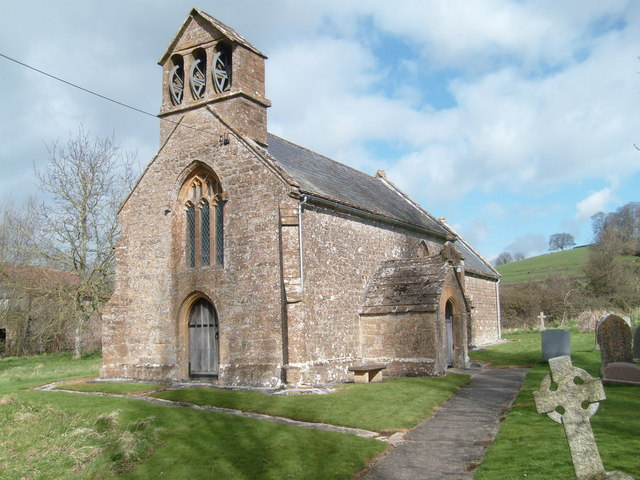

- Location within Somerset
- 50°56′57″N 2°52′24″W
- Location: Stocklinch, Somerset, England

History
- Built: 13th century

Listed Building – Grade I
- Official name: Church of St Mary Magdalen
- Designated: 4 February 1958
- Reference no.: 1057061

The Church of St Mary Magdalen in Stocklinch, Somerset, England, dates from the 13th century. It is recorded in the National Heritage List for England as a designated Grade I listed building, and is dedicated to Jesus' companion Mary Magdalene.

The church, which is 62 by 12 feet (18.9 m × 3.7 m) is built of local Ham stone with a ham stone roof.

The parish is part of the Winsmoor benefice within the Crewkerne and Ilminster deanery.

== See also ==
- Grade I listed buildings in South Somerset
- List of Somerset towers
- List of ecclesiastical parishes in the Diocese of Bath and Wells
