= Stawell, Somerset =

Village in Somerset, England

Coordinates: 51.142°N 2.909°W

Stawell
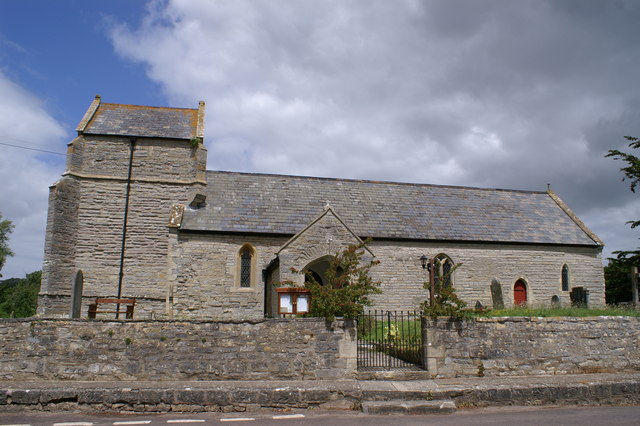
- Stawell church

- Location within Somerset
- Population: 386 (2011)
- OS grid reference: ST365385
- Unitary authority: Somerset Council
- Ceremonial county: Somerset
- Region: South West
- Country: England
- Sovereign state: United Kingdom
- Post town: BRIDGWATER
- Postcode district: TA7
- Dialling code: 01278
- Police: Avon and Somerset
- Fire: Devon and Somerset
- Ambulance: South Western
- UK Parliament: Wells and Mendip Hills

Stawell is a village and civil parish 4.5 miles (7 km) north-east of Bridgwater, and 2 miles (3 km) north-west of Moorlinch, in Somerset, England. The civil parish includes the village of Sutton Mallet.

== Governance ==
The parish council has responsibility for local issues, including setting an annual precept (local rate) to cover the council's operating costs and producing annual accounts for public scrutiny. The parish council evaluates local planning applications and works with the local police, district council officers, and neighbourhood watch groups on matters of crime, security, and traffic. The parish council's role also includes initiating projects for the maintenance and repair of parish facilities, as well as consulting with the district council on the maintenance, repair, and improvement of highways, drainage, footpaths, public transport, and street cleaning. Conservation matters (including trees and listed buildings) and environmental issues are also the responsibility of the council.

For local government purposes, since 1 April 2023, the village comes under the unitary authority of Somerset Council. Prior to this, it was part of the non-metropolitan district of Sedgemoor, which was formed on 1 April 1974 under the Local Government Act 1972, having previously been part of Bridgwater Rural District.

It is also part of the Wells and Mendip Hills constituency represented in the House of Commons of the Parliament of the United Kingdom. It elects one member of parliament by the first past the post system of election.

== Religious sites ==
Church of St Francis, Stawell dates from the 13th century and has been designated by English Heritage as a Grade II* listed building.

Sutton Mallet Church which has a church dating from 1829 on the site of an earlier church. It is Grade II listed. The church is in the care of the Churches Conservation Trust.

The raised stone "Coffin Walk" alongside part of Ford Lane next to the church is thought to be one of only three Coffin Walks left in the country. It is believed to have originally stretched from the old Roman Road above the village, partly following a still existing Public Footpath.

Corpse road - Wikipedia
