= Stockwood, Dorset =

Village in west Dorset, England

Coordinates: 50°51′42″N 2°35′14″W

Stockwood
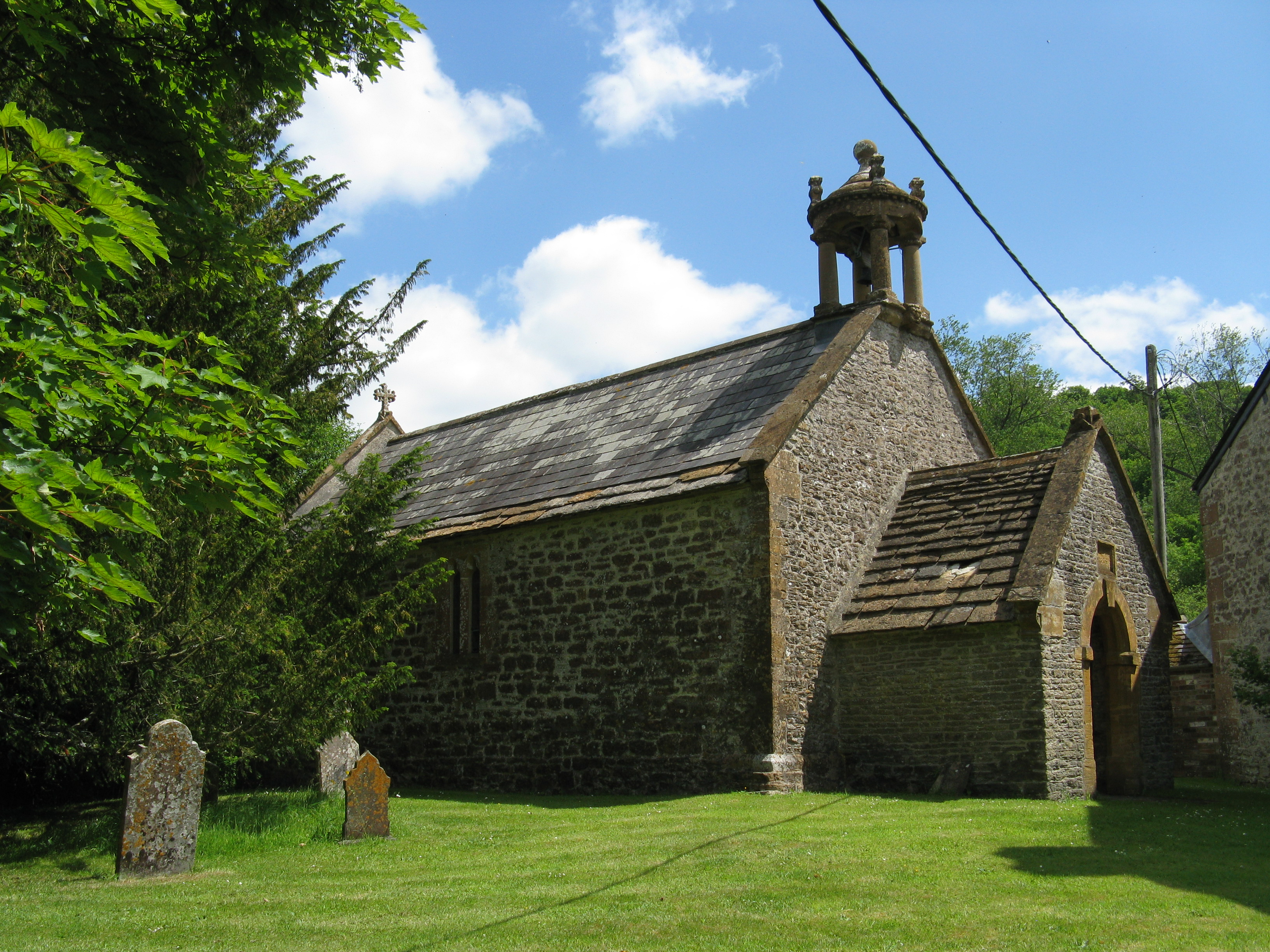
- Church of St Edwold, Stockwood

- Location within Dorset
- Population: 27 (2001 census)
- Civil parish: Stockwood
- Unitary authority: Dorset
- Ceremonial county: Dorset
- Region: South West
- Country: England
- Sovereign state: United Kingdom

Stockwood is a village and civil parish in west Dorset, England, around eight miles south-west of Sherborne and less than a mile away from Chetnole railway station on the Heart of Wessex Line. There are a few houses on the road leading to the A37 between Yeovil and Dorchester. In 2001 the parish had a population of 27.

St Edwold's Church, often described as Dorset's smallest church, is located in Stockwood.
