= Kendle =

Kendle is a surname. Notable people with the surname include:

- Charles Kendle (1875–1954), English cricketer
- Jeremy Kendle (born 1988), American basketball player
- Lukace Kendle, American murderer
- William Kendle (1847–1920), English cricketer

== See also ==
- Kendall (surname)
