= Winterborne and Broadmayne (ward) =

Electoral ward in Dorset, England

- ward Dorset Council
- Population: 4,309
- Major settlements: Broadmayne, Winterbourne Abbas, Winterborne St Martin, Tincleton

Current ward
- Created: 2019
- Councillor: Roland Tarr (Liberal Democrats)
- Number of councillors: 2

Winterborne and Broadmayne is an electoral ward in Dorset. Since 2019, the ward has elected 1 councillor to Dorset Council.

== Geography ==
The ward covers a large rural area between Dorchester and Weymouth. It is composed of the civil parishes of Bincombe, Broadmayne, Tincleton, West Knighton, West Stafford, Whitcombe, Winterbourne Abbas, Winterborne Came, Winterborne Herringston, Winterborne Monkton, Winterborne St Martin, Winterbourne Steepleton and Woodsford.

== Councillors ==
Election	Councillors
2019	Roland Tarr (Liberal Democrats)
2024	Roland Tarr (Liberal Democrats)

== Election ==
=== 2019 Dorset Council election ===
2019 Dorset Council election: Winterborne and Broadmayne (1 seat)
Party	Candidate	Votes	%	±%
Liberal Democrats	Roland Tarr	799	56.6	
Conservative	Robert Philip Freeman	412	29.2	
UKIP	Graham Richard Brant	201	14.2	
Majority				
Turnout			41.20	
Liberal Democrats win (new seat)				

=== 2024 Dorset Council election ===
2024 Dorset Council election: Winterborne & Broadmayne (1 seat)
Party	Candidate	Votes	%	±%
Liberal Democrats	Roland Tarr*	747	62.1	+5.5
Conservative	Mark Penfold	314	26.1	−3.1
Reform UK	Graham Richard Brant	142	11.8	−2.4
Rejected ballots		10	0.82	
Turnout		1,203	34.81	−6.39
Registered electors		3,490		
Liberal Democrats hold		Swing	▲4.2	

== See also ==
- List of electoral wards in Dorset
