= James Bandinel =

James Bandinel may refer to:

- James Bandinel (scholar) (1733–1804), Doctor of Divinity
- James Bandinel (civil servant) (1783–1849), Superintendent of the Slave Trade Department
- James Bandinel (priest) (1814–1892), Anglican priest, author and poet
