= Bandinel =

Bandinel is a surname. Notable people with the surname include:

- David Bandinel (1575–1645)
- James Bandinel (disambiguation), multiple people
