= Church of the Blessed Virgin Mary, East Lydford =

Church in Somerset, England

Church of the Blessed Virgin Mary
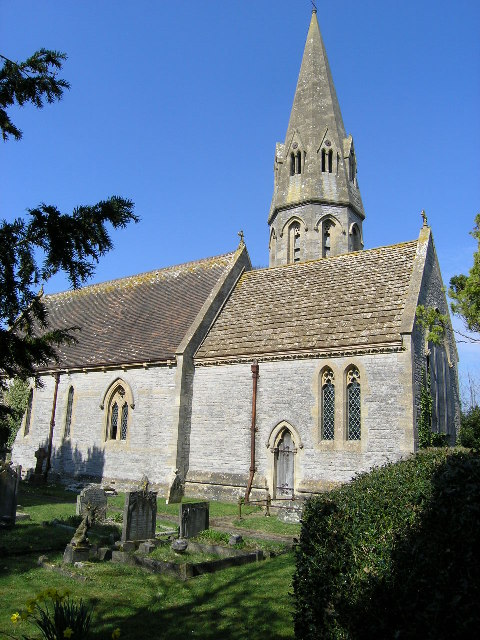

Religion
- Affiliation: Church of England
- Ecclesiastical or organizational status: Closed
- Year consecrated: 1866

Location
- Location: East Lydford, Somerset, England
- Interactive map of Church of the Blessed Virgin Mary
- Coordinates: 51.0789°N 2.6117°W

Architecture
- Architect: Benjamin Ferrey
- Type: Church

The Church of the Blessed Virgin Mary is a former Church of England church in East Lydford, Somerset, England. Designed by Benjamin Ferrey, it was built in 1864–66 and made redundant in 1989. The church, now in private ownership, is a Grade II listed building.

== History ==
The Church of the Blessed Virgin Mary was built to replace an earlier medieval church serving East Lydford, which was dedicated to St Peter. By the middle of the 19th-century, it had become dilapidated and was considered inadequate and uncomfortable. Furthermore, the church's location by the river made it prone to flooding; in the winter of 1863, heavy rain fell during a service and the congregation had to be taken home by cart as the surrounding fields became too flooded to navigate on foot.

The rector of the parish, Rev. John James Moss, offered to build a new church at his sole expense, as a memorial to his late wife, Louisa Mary Anne, who died in 1863. A meeting of 22 September 1864 saw the offer unanimously accepted, and the foundation stone was laid by Lieutenant-General Sir Edward Cust, the father of Mrs. Moss, on 5 October 1864. The chosen site for the new church was on a plot of land owned by Rev. Moss and more central to the village.

The church was designed by Benjamin Ferrey of London and built by Mr. Davis of Langport for a cost of £2,000. It was consecrated by the Bishop of Bath and Wells, the Right Rev. Robert Eden, on 11 April 1866.

The church was later closed in 1987 and declared redundant on 1 January 1989. By 1987, the church was only used for a monthly service and on other special occasions. In addition to requiring repairs estimated to cost £35,000, much of the local congregation favoured the Church of St Peter at Lydford-on-Fosse.

The church was at risk of demolition in 1989 and sold to a private owner in 1993. It was placed on Mendip District Council's Historic Buildings at Risk register that year. The 2011 register considered the building to have possible "structural problems", with an "immediate risk of further rapid deterioration".

== Architecture ==
The Church of the Blessed Virgin Mary is built of Keinton stone, with Doulting stone dressings and tile roofs, in the Early English style. It was designed to accommodate 100 persons and made up of a three-bay nave, chancel, south porch and north tower. The space under the tower served as a vestry and organ loft. The top of the tower is octagonal and has a spire standing at a height of 100 feet, topped with an ornamental cross and gilded weathercock. The nave was paved with encaustic tiles from Maw & Co and the open roof made from stained deal.

Internal fittings included the church's seating of stained deal and an oak pulpit which was transferred from the old church. The chancel stalls and reading desk were made from oak, while the font of Caen stone was gifted by Captain and Mrs. Chas Egerton in memory of their two infant children. The stained glass window at the east end was supplied by Heydon of London. Most of the church's fittings were moved upon closure to St Peter's at Lydford-on-Fosse.
