= Broadmayne =

Village in Dorset, England

Coordinates: 50.6774°N 2.3828°W

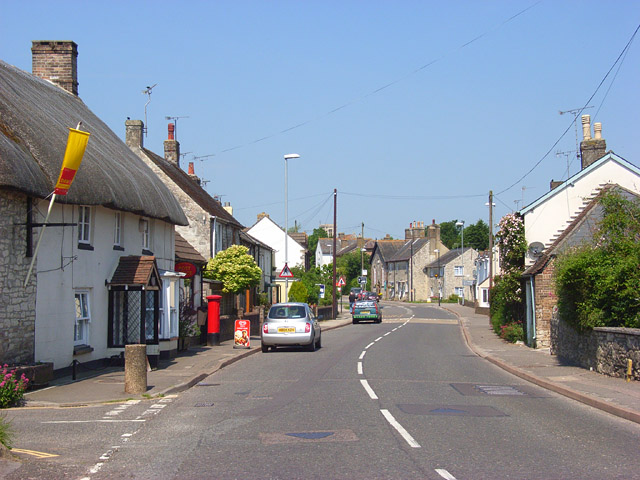
- Main Street, Broadmayne

- Location within Dorset
- Population: 1,204 (2011 Census)
- OS grid reference: SY729865
- Unitary authority: Dorset
- Ceremonial county: Dorset
- Region: South West
- Country: England
- Sovereign state: United Kingdom
- Post town: Dorchester
- Postcode district: DT2
- Dialling code: 01305
- Police: Dorset
- Fire: Dorset and Wiltshire
- Ambulance: South Western
- UK Parliament: West Dorset

Broadmayne is a village in the English county of Dorset. It lies two miles south-east of the county town Dorchester. The A352 main road between Dorchester (from Sherborne) and Wareham passes through the village. In the 2001 Census the population of the village was 1,864, reducing to 1,204 at the 2011 Census. There is an electoral ward of the same name whose population at the above census was 1,870. Village facilities and services include a post office, a clinic (closed since 2014) and a public house (The Black Dog). There are two churches in the village, both of which were redesigned by Thomas Hardy, who was an architect before he became a novelist. The parish church of St Martin dates from the 13th century and has a notable south tower.

== History ==
Broadmayne parish has a long history of human settlement. In the Domesday Book of 1086, one of two settlements named Maine in Culliford Tree Hundred was later called Friar Mayne to avoid confusion with another Maine (Parva Maene) sited at Little Mayne Farm in West Knighton parish. Between 1290 and 1338, a preceptory of the Knights Hospitaller was established at Friar Mayne. The preceptory declined in activity, then in 1533 began leasing its bailiwick to provide stipends for rectories, vicarages, and the larger preceptories in other locations.

The family estate of Sir Ferdinando Gorges, the founder of the State of Maine in the northeast United States, was in Broadmayne; one theory is that the state was named after the village.

== Politics ==
After 2019 structural changes to local government in England, Broadmayne is part of the Winterborne and Broadmayne ward which elects 1 member to Dorset Council.
