= Corfe =

Village and civil parish in Somerset, England

Coordinates: 50.9698°N 3.0908°W

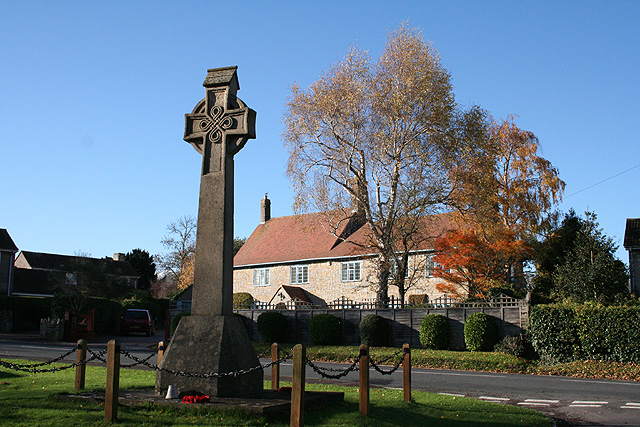
- Corfe War Memorial

- Location within Somerset
- Population: 253 (2011)
- OS grid reference: ST235195
- Unitary authority: Somerset Council
- Ceremonial county: Somerset
- Region: South West
- Country: England
- Sovereign state: United Kingdom
- Post town: TAUNTON
- Postcode district: TA3
- Dialling code: 01823
- Police: Avon and Somerset
- Fire: Devon and Somerset
- Ambulance: South Western
- UK Parliament: Taunton and Wellington

Corfe is a village and civil parish in Somerset, England, situated below the Blackdown Hills 4 miles (6.4 km) south of Taunton. The village has a population of 253.

== History ==
The parish of Corfe was part of the Taunton Deane Hundred. The village, along with nearby Pitminster was a tithing of Bishop of Winchester.

=== Barton Grange ===
Barton Grange was a 16th/17th-century country house, most of which was demolished in 1931 and the remaining kitchen wing later converted to flats. The building is grade II listed.

In the 12th century the bishop granted to Taunton Priory an estate on the boundary between the parishes of Corfe and Pitminster which became known as Barton Grange, and was the Prior of Taunton's summer residence. After the Dissolution of the Monasteries the estate was granted to the lawyer Humphrey Colles. A country mansion was built in the 17th century and passed down through the Colles family until inherited by Goodenough Earle. It then passed to his cousin, the artist Francis Newton, whose only daughter Josepha married Sir Frederick Grey-Cooper, son of Grey Cooper MP. Lady Cooper extensively remodelled the house in the 19th century before leaving it on her death in 1848 to Francis Wheat Newton. It was largely demolished in 1931 and the remaining buildings converted to flats in 1981.

== Governance ==
The parish council has responsibility for local issues, including setting an annual precept (local rate) to cover the council's operating costs and producing annual accounts for public scrutiny. The parish council evaluates local planning applications and works with the local police, district council officers, and neighbourhood watch groups on matters of crime, security, and traffic. The parish council's role also includes initiating projects for the maintenance and repair of parish facilities, as well as consulting with the district council on the maintenance, repair, and improvement of highways, drainage, footpaths, public transport, and street cleaning. Conservation matters (including trees and listed buildings) and environmental issues are also the responsibility of the council.

For local government purposes, since 1 April 2023, the village comes under the unitary authority of Somerset Council. Prior to this, it was part of the non-metropolitan district of Somerset West and Taunton (formed on 1 April 2019) and, before this, the district of Taunton Deane (established under the Local Government Act 1972). From 1894-1974, for local government purposes, Corfe was part of Taunton Rural District.

It is also part of the Taunton and Wellington county constituency represented in the House of Commons of the Parliament of the United Kingdom. It elects one Member of Parliament (MP) by the first past the post system of election.

== Religious sites ==
The parish Church of St Nicholas was an 1842 rebuilding, by Benjamin Ferrey of a Norman church on the same site. The south aisle was added in 1858 and tower was rebuilt. In 1969 the chancel was further restored. The Norman font survives.
