= Christ Church, Melplash =

Church in Dorset, England

Christ Church
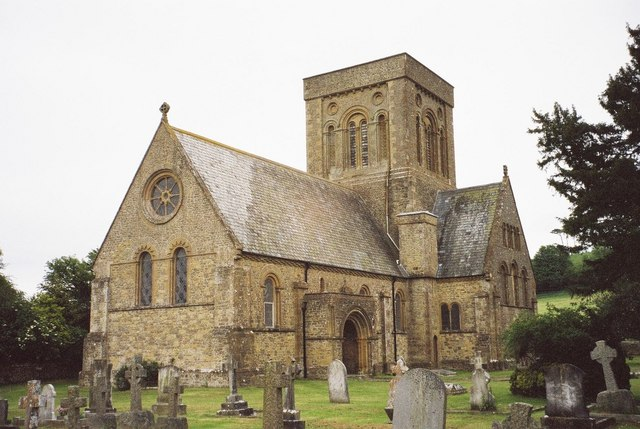
- Christ Church

Religion
- Affiliation: Church of England
- Ecclesiastical or organizational status: Active
- Year consecrated: 1846

Location
- Location: Melplash, Dorset, England
- Interactive map of Christ Church
- Coordinates: 50.7752°N 2.7325°W

Architecture
- Architect: Benjamin Ferrey
- Type: Church

Christ Church is a Church of England church in Melplash, Dorset, England. It was built in 1845–46 to the designs of Benjamin Ferrey and has been a Grade II* listed building since 1984. Today the church is part of the Beaminster Area Team Ministry.

== History ==
Much of the church's expense was donated by James Bandinel in dedication to his father Dr. Bandinel, who served as vicar of Netherbury. The vicar had envisioned the construction of a church to serve Melplash since the 1790s, however he died before he could bring his plans to fruition. Bandinel also gifted the plot of land for the church and financed a permanent endowment.

The foundation stone was laid by the Revd S. Hay on 15 May 1845 in the presence of 4,000 people and the church built by Mr. Davis of Langport to the designs of Benjamin Ferrey. Christ Church was consecrated by the Bishop of Salisbury, the Rt Revd Edward Denison, on 20 October 1846.

To serve the educational needs of the village, Bandinel donated further land and paid for the construction of a school adjacent to the church, dated 1849 and now converted into a house. The church's original parsonage, a converted farmhouse at Camesworth also provided by Bandinel, was burnt down in 1882 and replaced with a new residence on a nearby site. A new vicarage was later built adjoining the church in 1924.

In 1975, the church underwent internal alterations to allow the nave to be screened off for use as a hall and badminton court.

== Architecture ==
Christ Church is built of local stone with Ham stone dressings and roofs of slate and lead, in a Neo-Norman style. It was built with a cruciform plan, containing a central tower, four-bay nave, apsidal chancel, north and south transepts, north vestry and south porch.
