= William Kendle =

English cricketer

Personal information
- Full name: William James Kendle
- Born: 9 April 1847; Romsey, Hampshire, England
- Died: 30 January 1920 (aged 72); Woodsford, Dorset, England
- Batting: Right-handed
- Relatives: Charles Kendle (brother

Domestic team information
- Years: Team
- 1869–1878: Hampshire

Career statistics
Competition	First-class
Matches	5
Runs scored	66
Batting average	7.33
100s/50s	–/–
Top score	29
Catches/stumpings	1/–
- Source: Cricinfo, 22 January 2010

William James Kendle (9 April 1847 — 30 January 1920) was an English first-class cricketer and clergyman.

The son of W. T. Kendle, he was born at Broadlands near Romsey in April 1847. Kendle was educated at Sherborne School, before matriculating to Caius College, Cambridge. At Cambridge, he was a member of Cambridge University Cricket Club but did not play at first-class level for the university. However, he did play first-class cricket for Hampshire during his studies, making a single appearance against the Marylebone Cricket Club at Southampton in 1869. After graduating from Cambridge, he was ordained in the Church of England as a deacon at Ripon Cathedral in 1871. Later that same year he took up the post of curate at Elland, which he held until 1881. Despite his ecclesiastical duties in the North of England, Kendle still found the time to play first-class cricket for Hampshire, making one appearance in 1875 and three in 1878. In five first-class matches for Hampshire, he scored 66 runs at an average of 7.33, with a highest score of 29.

In 1881, he moved to Dorset where he was chaplain of the Dorset County Asylum until 1882. From there, he spent a year as curate of Wimborne St Giles, prior to being appointed vicar at Aspall in Suffolk in 1886. The following year, he was appointed reverend of Woodsford with Tincleton in 1887; he held this post for 33 years. While in Dorset, he rekindled his association with Sherborne School by serving as honorary secretary of the Old Shirburnians Cricket Club. Kendle died at Woodford in January 1920. His brother, Charles Kendle, was also a first-class cricketer.
