= Church of St James the Less, Hambridge =

Church in Somerset, England

Church of St James the Less
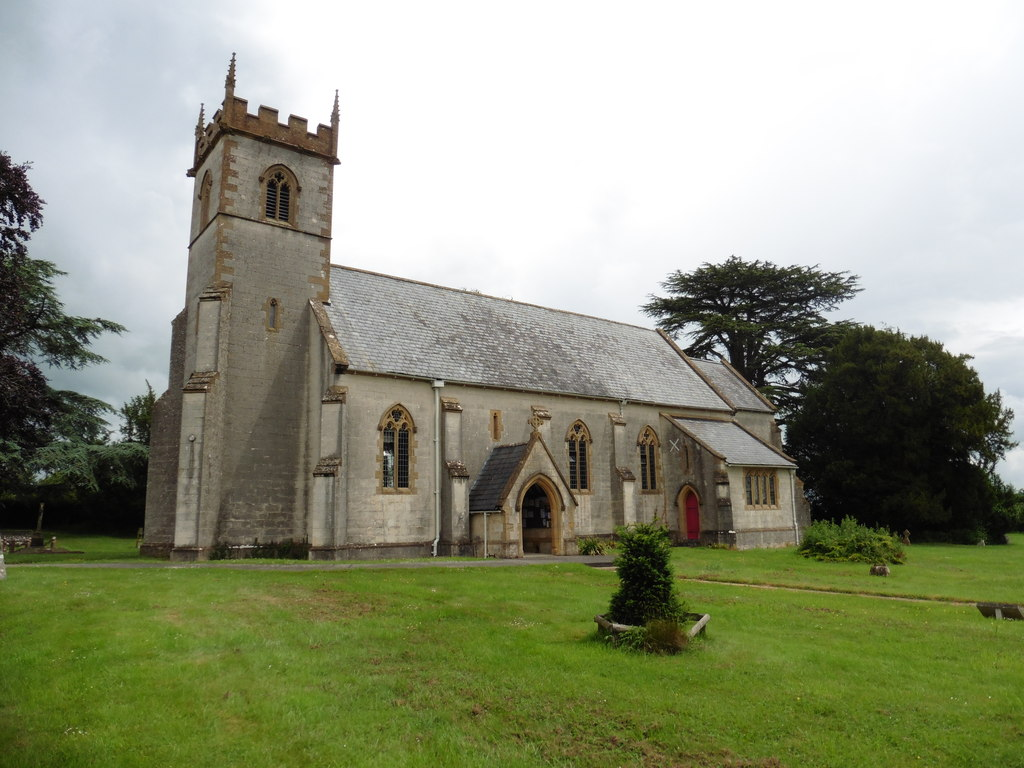

Religion
- Affiliation: Church of England
- Ecclesiastical or organizational status: Active
- Year consecrated: 1844

Location
- Location: Hambridge, Somerset, England
- Interactive map of Church of St James the Less
- Coordinates: 50.9848°N 2.8666°W

Architecture
- Architect: Benjamin Ferrey
- Type: Church

The Church of St James the Less is a Church of England parish church in Hambridge, Somerset, England. It was designed by Benjamin Ferrey and built in 1842–44. The church has been a Grade II listed building since 1988. Adjacent the church is a former national school, which was built in 1844 and is also Grade II listed.

== History ==
The Church of St James the Less was built as the district church for Hambridge and Westport. Prior to its construction, inhabitants were between two and three and a half miles from the parish church of St Andrew at Curry Rivel.

The plans for the church were drawn up by Benjamin Ferrey of London and Mr. Maurice Davis of Langport was hired as the builder. A plot of land was purchased for £140 and the church built for an approximate cost of £800. A grant of £120 was received from the Bath and Wells Diocesan Church Building Association.

The foundation stone was laid on 20 June 1842, and the church and its cemetery were consecrated by the Bishop of Salisbury, the Right Rev. Edward Denison, on 2 February 1844.

The church underwent a £1,500 restoration scheme in 1957–58, after a survey of the building identified essential repairs to be made. A bazaar held in October 1958 was successful in clearing the remaining £144 debt.

== Architecture ==
St James is built of White lias, with Ham stone dressings and slate roofs, in the Decorated style. It is made up of a five-bay nave, chancel, west tower, north organ chamber, south vestry and south porch. The two-stage tower has battlements, pinnacles, gargoyles and a diagonal buttress on the west side. It contains a single bell. The church was designed to hold 246 sittings, 150 of which were free and unappropriated.

A stained glass window was added to the church in 1866 in memory of the fur dyer and engineer John Appold. It was made by O'Connor and paid for by Rev. C. S. Grueber and friends.
