= Church of St Nicholas, Corfe =

Church in Somerset, England

Church of St Nicholas
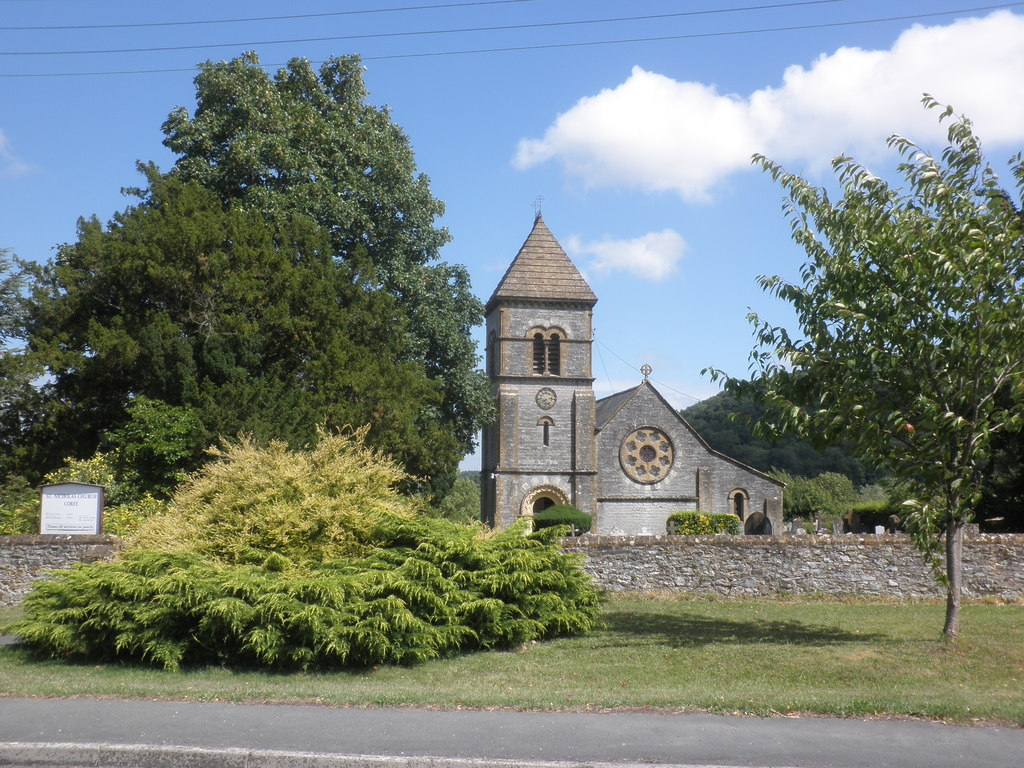

- Location within Somerset
- 50.9715°N 3.0945°W
- Location: Corfe, Somerset, England

Listed Building – Grade II*
- Official name: Church of St Nicholas
- Designated: 25 February 1955
- Reference no.: 1060345

The Anglican Church of St Nicholas in Corfe, Somerset, England was built in the Norman period and rebuilt in 1842. It is a Grade II* listed building.

== History ==
The Church of St Nicholas is an 1842 rebuilding, by Benjamin Ferrey of a Norman church on the same site. The chancel arch and nave arcade are neo-Romanesque and, along with two corbels, have survived from the design of the original building.

The south aisle was added and tower rebuilt in 1858 by Charles Edmund Giles. Stained glass by James Powell and Sons was installed in the 1850s.

In 1969 the chancel was further restored.

The parish is part of the Blackdown benefice within the Diocese of Bath and Wells.

== Architecture ==
The church is built of Blue Lias with stone dressing and a slate roof. It has a four-bay nave, a south aisle and a chancel. The three-stage tower has a pyramidal roof.

Inside the church the Norman white stone font survives.

The churchyard includes an unidentified chest tomb from around 1860, and one for the Brown family from the late 18th century.

== See also ==
- List of ecclesiastical parishes in the Diocese of Bath and Wells
