= Church of St Mary Magdalene, Wookey Hole =

Church in Somerset, England

Church of St Mary Magdalene
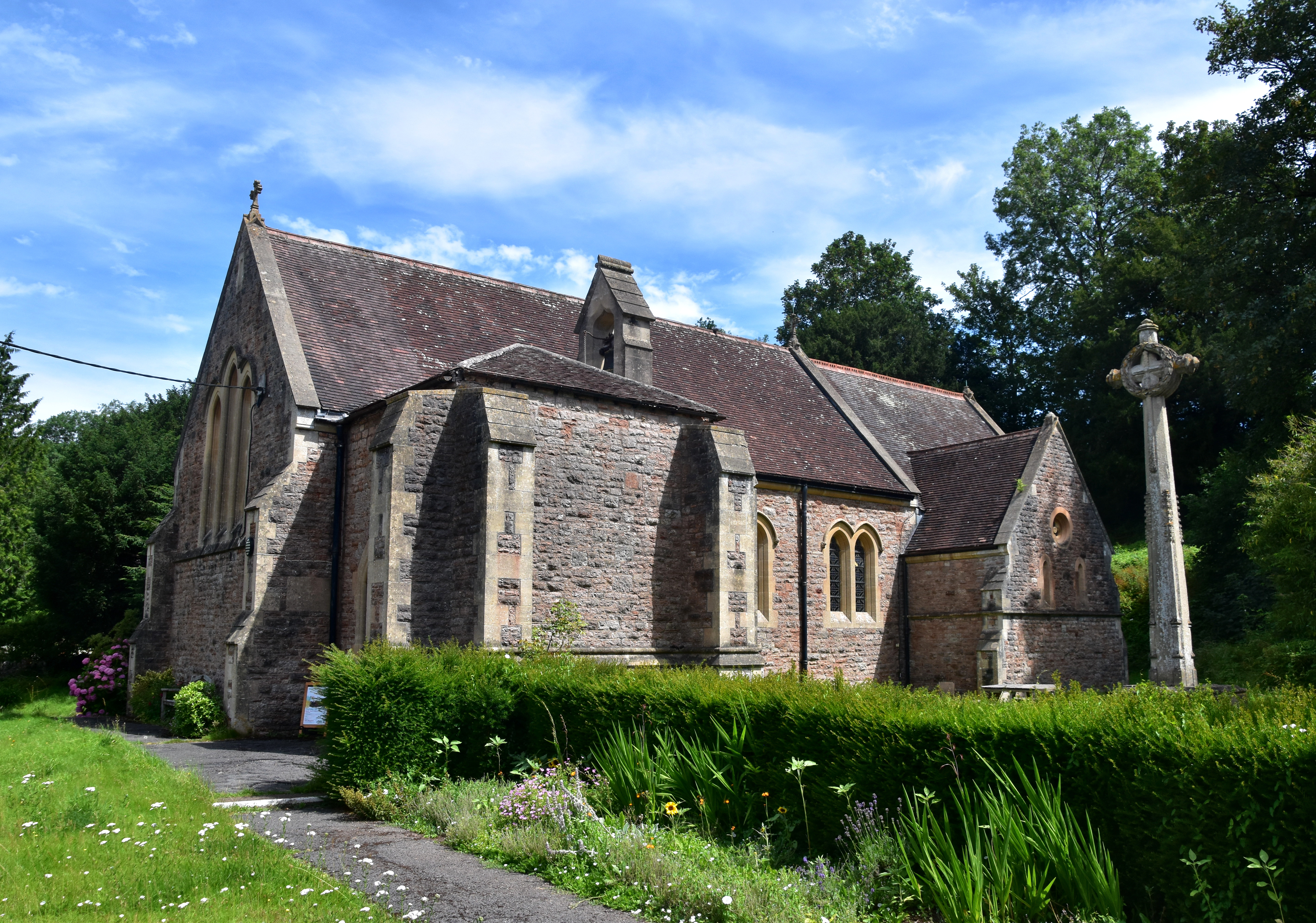
- Church of St Mary Magdalene

Religion
- Affiliation: Church of England
- Ecclesiastical or organizational status: Active
- Year consecrated: 1874

Location
- Location: Wookey Hole, Somerset, England
- Interactive map of Church of St Mary Magdalene
- Coordinates: 51.2255°N 2.6710°W

Architecture
- Architects: Benjamin Ferrey, Benjamin E. Ferrey
- Type: Church

The Church of St Mary Magdalene is a Church of England church in Wookey Hole, Somerset, England, dedicated to Jesus' companion Mary Magdalene. The church, which was designed by Benjamin Ferrey and his son, was built in 1873-74 and has been a Grade II listed building since 2004.

== History ==
The Church of St Mary Magdalene was erected as a chapel of ease to St Cuthbert's Church in Wells. At the time, the population of Wookey Hole was increasing as a result of the paper industry, the local mills of which were operated by Messrs. William S. Hodgkinson and Co. As a benefactor of the village, Mr. Hodgkinson had a number of dwellings and other buildings erected in the village, including the school in 1871. With support from Rev. J. Beresford, the Vicar of the parish of St. Cuthbert's, Mr. Hodgkinson began a movement for a church, with funding raised by public subscription.

With designs drawn up by Benjamin Ferrey and his son Benjamin Edmund Ferrey, the foundation stone of the new church was laid by the Bishop of Bath and Wells, the Rt Rev. Lord Arthur Hervey, in November 1873. The church's nave and base of tower, which also acted as the south porch, were the first to be constructed by Mr. James Diment of Bristol for a cost of £1,800. With the church's overall cost anticipated to be £3,000, addition funds were required before further work on the church could be carried out, however the completion of the nave and porch allowed the building to be consecrated by the Bishop of Bath and Wells on 24 June 1874.

The chancel, vestry and organ chamber was constructed by Messrs Stephens and Bastow of Bristol in 1876–77, with the required £1,100 funded by Mrs. Hodgkinson in memory of her husband. The opening of the new section of the church was celebrated with special services held on 11 June 1877. An organ, built by W.G. Vowles and Son of Bristol, was later donated by Mrs. Hodgkinson in 1880.

The church was restored, beautified and altered in 1922–23, with the £3,000 cost having been paid for by the Hodgkinson family. The plans for the scheme were drawn up by Frank Ernest Howard and the work carried out by Messrs. Mowbray of Oxford. The scheme included the enlargement of the vestry and new furnishings added such as a stone font with carved panels and a bell, first rung on 5 November 1922. The floor was re-tiled and the seating re-stained by voluntary work of local residents. A dedication service was held by the Archdeacon of Wells, the Ven. Walter Farrer, on 29 July 1923.

== Architecture ==
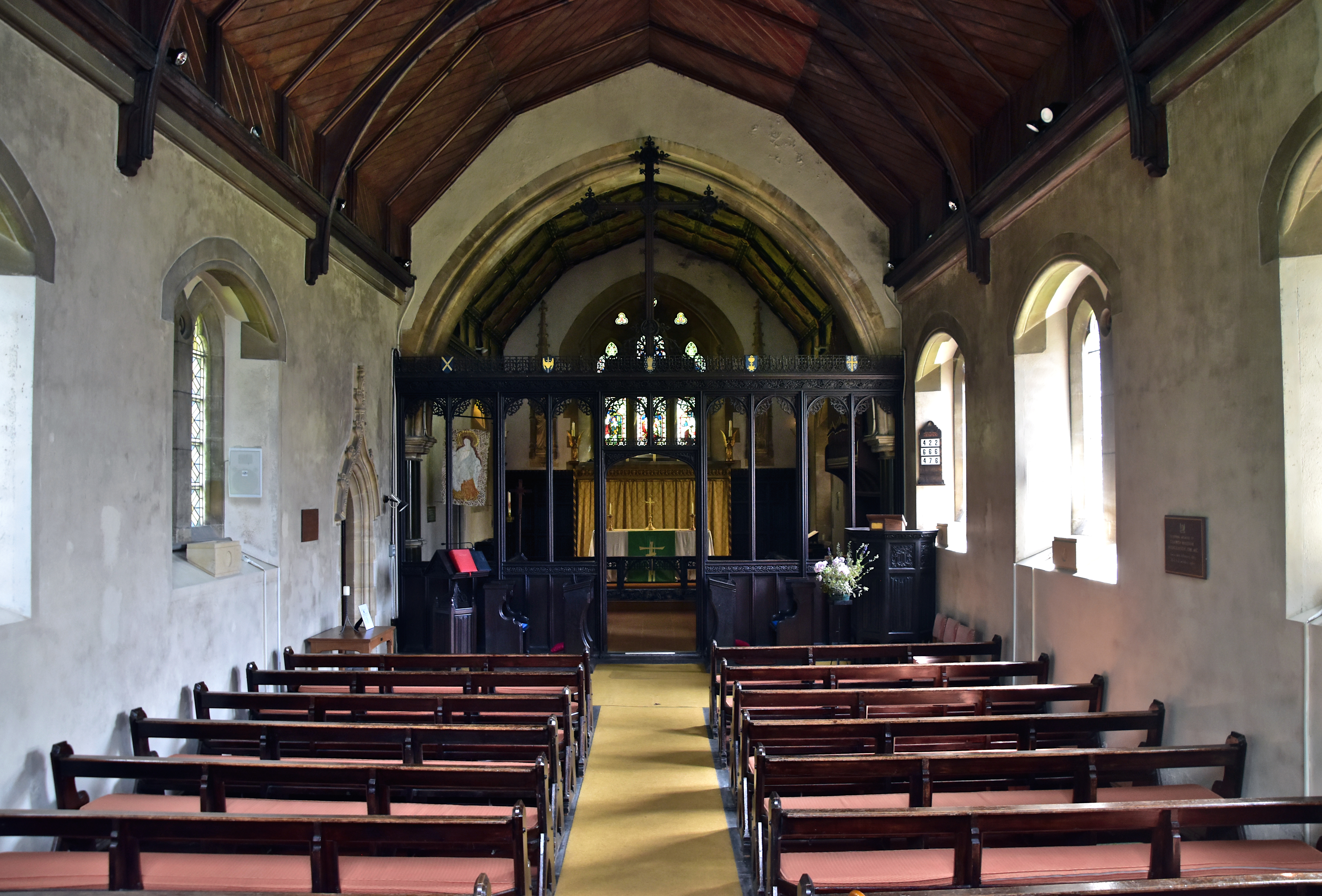
The interior of the Church of St Mary Magdalene.

The church was built of local stone obtained from Mr. Hodgkinson's nearby quarry, with dressings and quoins of Doulting stone, in an Early English Gothic style. The building is made up of a nave, chancel, vestry and organ chamber. The tower base, which also doubled as the porch, was placed in the south-west corner of the nave. An extension of the tower, complete with a decorated spire, was intended, but the work never carried out.

In the churchyard is a World War I memorial of Doulting stone, designed, built and erected by Mr. T. Mills of Wells. It was dedicated by the Archdeacon of Wells on 20 December 1919, and has been Grade II listed since 2004.
