= Francis Milner Newton =

English painter

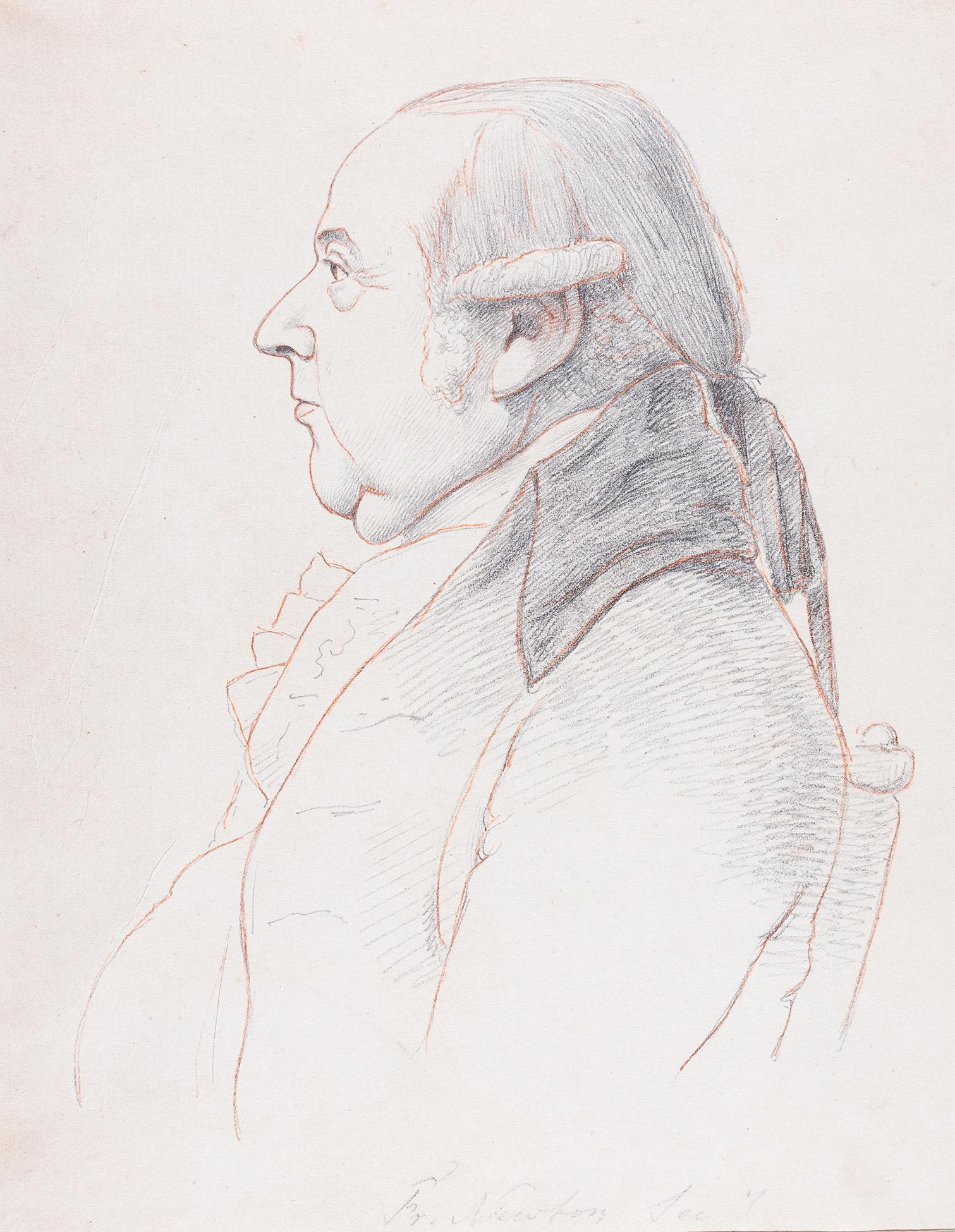
Francis Milner Newton - William Daniell after George Dance the Younger, chalk and pencil drawing

Milner, a detail from The Portraits of the Academicians of the Royal Academy, 1771-72, Royal Collection, by Johan Zoffany.

Francis Milner Newton RA (1720 in London – 14 August 1794 in Corfe) was an English portrait painter and first secretary of the Royal Academy.

== Life ==
Newton was a pupil of Marcus Tuscher, a German artist living in England, and also studied at Hogarth's St Martin's Lane Academy.

In October 1753 he was one of a group of artists who drew up a prospectus for the establishment of a national academy of art. The plan came to nothing, but in 1755 a committee of artists was formed for a similar purpose, and Newton was appointed secretary, but with no more success. A more successful meeting of artists was held at the Turk's Head tavern on 12 November. 1759, and a committee of sixteen artists was set up, with Newton once again acting as secretary. The following spring, an exhibition organised by the committee was held in the gallery of the Society of Arts in the Strand, to which Newton contributed a portrait. Following disagreements with the Society of Arts, it was decided to hire an auctioneer's rooms in Spring Gardens for the group's second exhibition in 1761. By the time the exhibition came to be held, a schism had taken place among the artists. One faction, exhibiting at Spring Gardens, advertised itself as the "Society of Artists of Great Britain", with Newton named as its secretary. The other faction exhibited at the Society of Arts. Both groups held annual exhibitions over the next few years. In 1765 the Society of Artists of Great Britain obtained a charter becoming "The Incorporated Society of Artists", with Newton still as secretary.

In 1768 a further schism took place within the Incorporated Society, as a result of which Newton and some of its directors, were ejected. The excluded artists formed themselves into a new society, and by obtaining the patronage of the king, George III, brought about the foundation of the Royal Academy of Arts, under the presidency of Sir Joshua Reynolds. Newton was elected their first secretary, a post he held until his resignation in 1788. John Evan Hodgson, a later librarian of the Academy, said of him:

he was not a great artist, and is absolutely unknown to fame; but he occupied a very honourable position and performed its duties worthily; he lived in stirring times, with great men as his friends and associates; we are bound to respect his memory, and can only regret that we do not know more of him.

He exhibited eight portraits at the academy between 1769 and 1774. His address is given in the catalogues as Mortimer Street in the first year, and Portland Street after that date.

Newton lived at Hammersmith in west London for some years, until inheriting Barton Grange, a property at Corfe belonging to his mother's family, where he spent the rest of his life. He died there on 14 August 1794, and was buried at Corfe. He left one child, Josepha Sophia.

== Sources ==
Pye, John (1845). Patronage of British Art, an Historical Sketch. London: Longman, Brown, Green and Longmans.
