= Benjamin Ferrey =

English architect (1810–1880)

- Born: 1 April 1810; Christchurch, Hampshire, England
- Died: 22 August 1880 (aged 70); 5 Inverness Terrace, London, England
- Occupation: Architect

Benjamin Ferrey FSA FRIBA (1 April 1810 – 22 August 1880) was an English architect who worked mostly in the Gothic Revival.

== Early life ==
Benjamin Ferrey was the youngest son of Benjamin Ferrey Snr (1779–1847), a draper who became Mayor of Christchurch, then in Hampshire, and his wife Ann Pillgrem (1773–1824). He was educated at Wimborne Grammar School.

== Career ==
After grammar school, Ferrey went to London to study under Augustus Charles Pugin and alongside Pugin's son Augustus Welby Northmore Pugin.

In his early twenties Ferrey toured continental Europe, then studied further in the office of William Wilkins. He started his own architectural practice in 1834, in Great Russell Street, Bloomsbury, London. Some of the earliest work of his practice was in the design of the new seaside resort of Bournemouth, particularly his work on Bournemouth Gardens with Decimus Burton. The business grew rapidly and was very successful, with Ferrey designing and restoring or rebuilding many Church of England parish churches. Ferrey also designed private houses and public buildings, including a number of Tudor Revival ones in the earlier part of his career.

In his History of the Gothic Revival, Charles Eastlake described Ferrey as "one of the earliest, ablest, and most zealous pioneers of the modern Gothic school," adding that his work "possessed the rare charm of simplicity, without lacking interest".

Ferrey was twice vice-president of the Royal Institute of British Architects and in 1870 was awarded a Royal Gold Medal. He was diocesan architect to the Diocese of Bath and Wells from 1841 until his death, carrying out much of the restoration work on Wells Cathedral and the Bishop's Palace. He was also appointed honorary secretary to the Architects' Committee for the Houses of Parliament.

== Personal life ==
Ferrey married twice. On 26 April 1836 at Islington, he married Ann Mary (Annie) Lucas (1812–1871). They had five children: Alicia (1838–1924), Ellen (1840–41), Eleanor Mary (1842–45), Benjamin Edmund (1845–1900) and Annie (1847–1926). Benjamin Edmund or Edmund Benjamin also became an architect, studying under his father and then assisting in his work.

After the death of his first wife in 1871, he married a second time, in 1872 at Weymouth, Dorset, to Emily Hopkinson (1829–1922).

Ferrey died on 22 August 1880 at his London home.

== Selected works ==
=== Buildings ===
- Tarrant Hinton, Dorset: Old Rectory, 1836
- Westover, Hampshire: estate of villas, 1836 (demolished 1906–29)
- Royal Bath Hotel, Bournemouth, Hampshire (now Dorset), 1837–38
- St Thomas of Canterbury parish church, Compton Valence, Dorset: rebuilding of church (except tower), 1839–40
- Dorset County Hospital, Dorchester, Dorset, 1839 onwards
- Clyffe House, Tincleton, Dorset, 1842
- Parish church of St James, Hambridge, Somerset, 1842

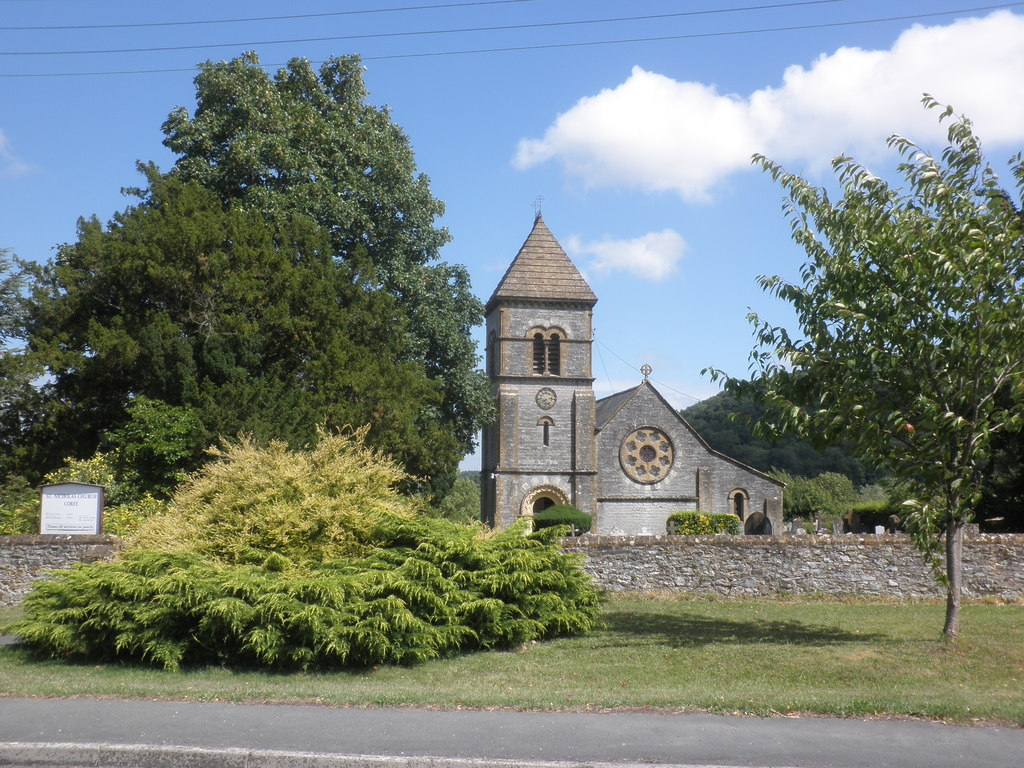
Parish church of St Nicholas, Corfe, Somerset

- Parish church of St Nicholas, Corfe, Somerset, 1842
- All Saints' parish church, Dogmersfield, Hampshire, 1843
- All Saints' parish church, High East Street, Dorchester, Dorset, (with ADH Acland) 1843–45
- St James' parish church, Morpeth, Northumberland, 1843–46
- St John the Evangelist Church, Hale, Surrey, 1844, rare example of Romanesque rather than Gothic work
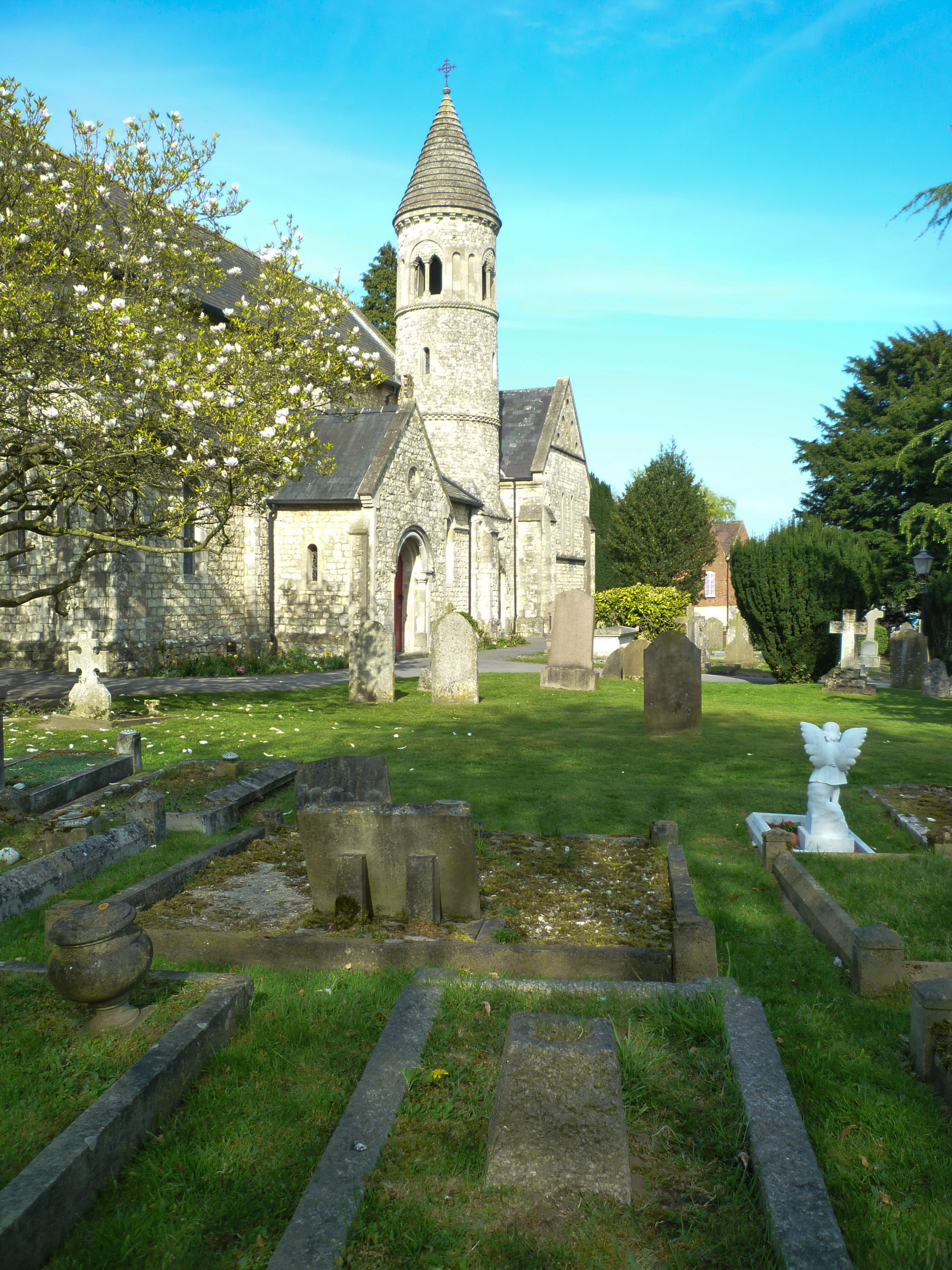
  St John the Evangelist, Hale, Farnham, Surrey
- St Nicholas' parish church, Grafton, Wiltshire, 1844
- St Mary's parish church, Winterborne Whitchurch, Dorset: rebuilt nave, added south aisle and south transept, 1844
- St Thomas' parish church, Keresley, Coventry, 1844–45
- St Mary's parish church, Chilton Foliat, Wiltshire: restoration, 1845
- Holy Trinity parish church, Nuffield, Oxfordshire: restored chancel, 1845
- St Stephen's parish church, Baughurst, Hampshire, 1845
- Christ Church parish church, Melplash, Dorset, 1845–46
- St Swithin's parish church, Wickham, Berkshire, 1845–49: nave, chancel and upper part of bell-tower
- Holy Trinity parish church, Yeovil, Somerset, 1843–46
- St Osmund's parish church, Osmington, Dorset: reconstruction, 1846
- St Barnabas' parish church, Swanmore, Hampshire, 1846
- St Edmund's parish church, Vobster, Somerset, 1846
- St Mary's parish church, Twyford, Berkshire, 1846
- St Peter's parish church, West Lydford, Somerset, 1846
- Saints Peter and Paul chapel, Bishop's Palace, Cuddesdon, Oxfordshire, 1846

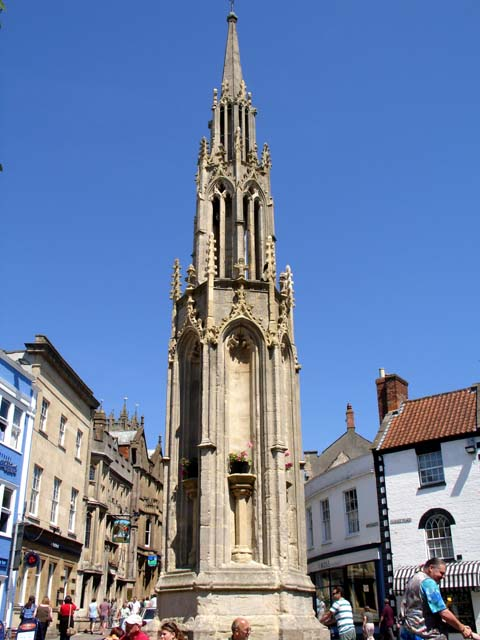
Part of the Market Cross in Glastonbury

- Market cross, Glastonbury, Somerset, 1846
- Christ Church, Henton, Somerset, 1847
- Municipal Buildings, Dorchester, Dorset, 1847–48
- St Boniface' parish church, Bonchurch, Isle of Wight, 1847–48
- St Peter's College, Saltley, Birmingham, 1847–52
- St Barnabas' parish church, Linslade, Bedfordshire, 1848
- St John the Baptist parish church, Plush, Dorset, 1848
- Holy Trinity parish church, Henley-on-Thames, Oxfordshire, 1848
- St Mary the Virgin parish church, Stamfordham, Northumberland: restoration, 1848
- Christchurch Priory, Hampshire: pulpitum, 1848
- Stafford House, West Stafford, Dorset: west front, 1848–50
- St Margaret's parish church, Harpsden, Oxfordshire: extended nave, added aisle and bell tower, 1848–54
- Holy Trinity parish church, Penn Street, Buckinghamshire, 1849
- St John the Evangelist parish church, Tincleton, Dorset, 1849
- The (Old) School House, Tincleton, Dorset, circa 1849.
- Holy Trinity parish church, Wood Green, Witney, Oxfordshire, 1849
- St Peter's parish church, Cranbourne, Berkshire, 1849
- All Saints' parish church, Bisham, Berkshire: restoration, 1849
- All Saints' parish church, Cuddesdon, Oxfordshire: restoration, 1849
- St Thomas' parish church, Colnbrook, Buckinghamshire, 1849–52
- Holy Trinity parish church, Grazeley, Berkshire, 1850
- St Michael and All Angels Church, Littlebredy, Dorset: rebuilding of church and addition of spire, 1850
- St Botolph's parish church, Swyncombe, Oxfordshire: restoration, 1850
- Christ Church, Kensington, London, 1850-51
- St Teilo's Church, Merthyr Mawr, (formerly Glamorgan), 1851
- St Laurence's parish church, Upton, Slough, Buckinghamshire: south aisle, 1852
- St Mark's parish church, Hedgerley, Buckinghamshire, 1852
- St Mary's parish church, Kirtlington, Oxfordshire: rebuilt tower, 1853
- Holy Trinity parish church, Deanshanger, Northamptonshire, 1853
- St Paul's parish church, Neithrop, Banbury, Oxfordshire, 1853
- Parish church of St Mary, Buckland St Mary, Somerset, 1853–63
- Battleford Hall, Fleet, Lincolnshire. Old Rectory, 1854
- St Mark's parish church, Fairfield, Worcestershire, 1854
- All Saints parish church, Huntsham, Devon, 1854–56
- Holy Trinity, Bengeo, Hertfordshire, 1855
- Parish church of All Saints, Castle Cary, Somerset: rebuilding, 1855
- Christ Church, Bala, Gwynedd (formerly Merionethshire), 1855.
- St Giles' parish church, Barlestone, Leicestershire, 1855
- St Paul's parish church, Scropton, Derbyshire, 1855–56
- All Saints' parish church, Curland, Somerset, 1856
- Chapels at Ocklynge cemetery, Eastbourne, East Sussex, 1857

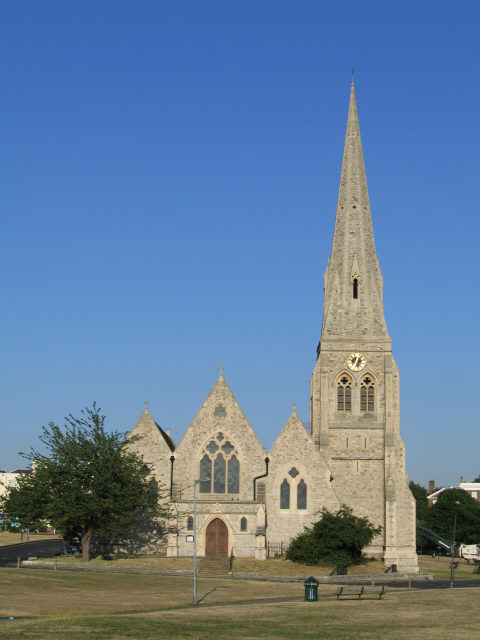
All Saints' parish church, Blackheath, built 1857–67

- All Saints' Blackheath, Blackheath, London, 1857–67
- Christ Church, Eastbourne, East Sussex, 1859
- Grammar School, Morpeth, Northumberland, 1859
- Chase Cliffe House, Crich, Derbyshire, 1859–61
- St Mary's Church, Crich, Derbyshire: restoration, 1861
- St Andrew's parish church, West Hatch, Somerset, 1861
- Parish church of All Saints, Merriott, Somerset: chancel, chapels, east end of nave, 1862
- Bulstrode Park, Buckinghamshire: house, 1862
- Christchurch Priory, Dorset (formerly Hampshire): restoration including porch vaulting, 1862

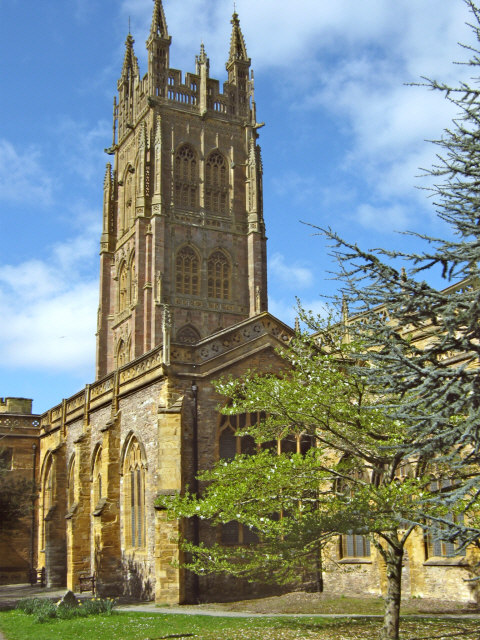
Parish church of St Mary Magdalene, Taunton, Somerset

- Parish church of St Mary Magdalene, Taunton, Somerset: rebuilding, with George Gilbert Scott, 1862
- Parish church of St Mary the Virgin, East Stoke, Somerset: restoration, 1862
- St Mary's parish church, Eling, Hampshire: restoration, 1863–65
- SS Mary and Peter's parish church, Pett, East Sussex, 1864
- St Mary's parish church, Warmington, Northamptonshire: restored chancel, 1865
- St Michael and All Angels' church, Chetwynd, Shropshire, 1865–67
- All Hallows' parish church, Whitchurch, Hampshire: restoration, 1866
- St Mary's parish church, East Lydford, Somerset, 1866
- Parish church of SS Peter and Paul, Lufton, Somerset, 1866
- St Giles' Church, Wrexham (formerly Denbighshire): restoration, 1867

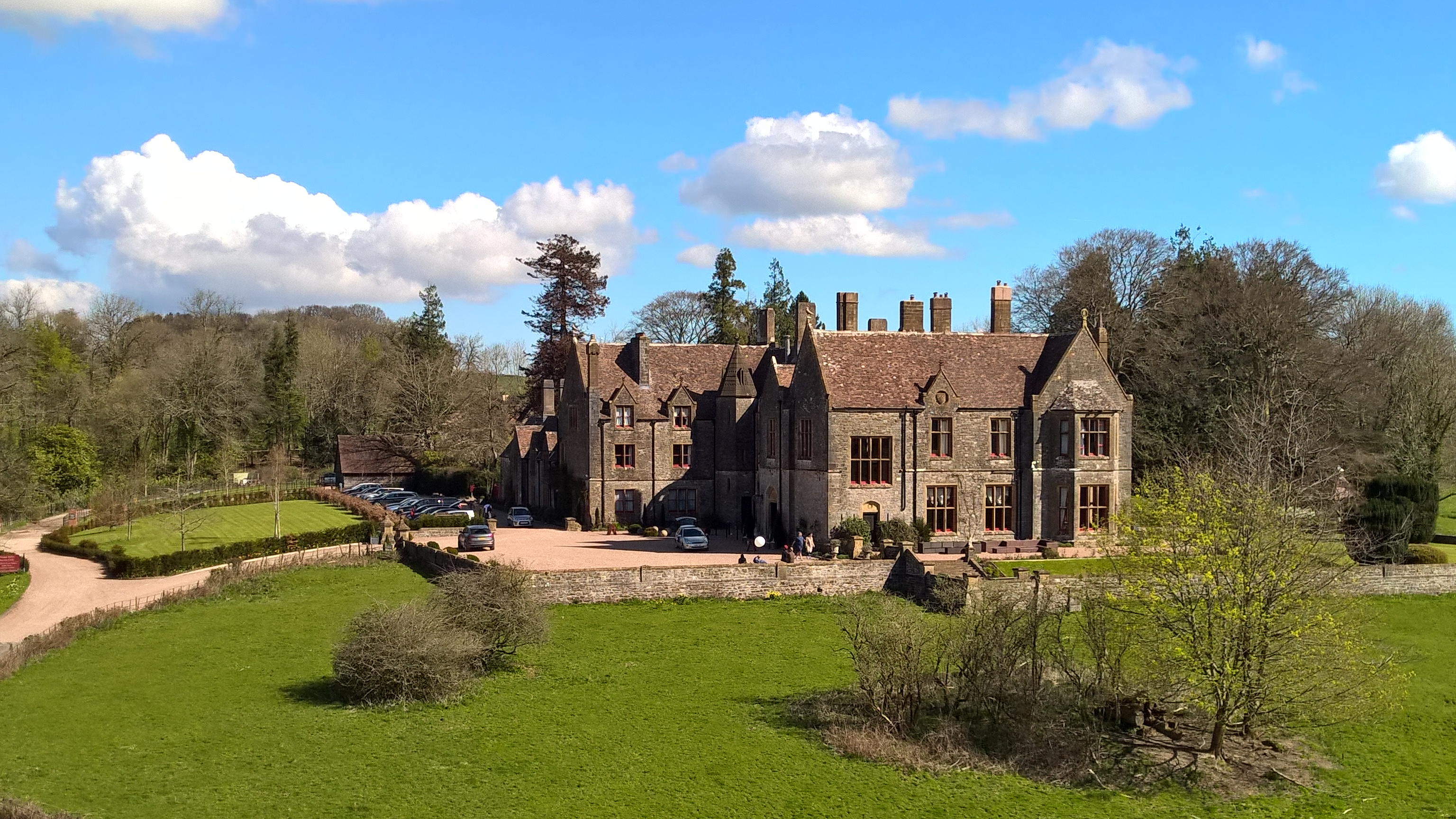
Huntsham Court, Devon, built 1868–70

- Huntsham Court, Huntsham, Devon, 1868–70
- Parish church of All Saints, Chipstable, Somerset, 1869
- St Michael's parish church, Otterton, Devon: rebuilt 1869–71
- Christ Church parish church and vicarage, Colbury, Hampshire, 1870
- St James' parish church, Birlingham, Worcestershire: rebuilt 1871–72
- St John the Evangelist, Holdenhurst, Hampshire (now Dorset): chancel, 1873
- St Mary's parish church, Bransgore, Hampshire: chancel, 1873
- Church of St Michael, Enmore, Somerset: restoration, new north aisle, 1873
- Church of St Mary Magdalene, Wookey Hole, Somerset, 1873–74
- St Mary's parish church, Tarrant Hinton, Dorset: chancel, 1874
- St Mary's Church, Wingham 1874–75
- Parish Church of St Luke, Burton, Christchurch, Dorset (1874–75)
- Holy Trinity parish church, High West Street, Dorchester, Dorset, 1875–76
- Parish church of the Holy Cross, Babcary, Somerset: north aisle, 1876
- Christchurch Priory, Hampshire: nave gallery
- Jumpers' Cemetery, Christchurch, Hampshire (now Dorset): arched gateway and two chapels

=== Buildings by Edmund Benjamin Ferrey (the son) ===
- Church of St Deiniol, Llanuwchllyn, Gwynedd (1873)
- St Bartholomew's Church, Burstow, Surrey (1884–95)
- Church of St Thomas a Becket, Framfield, East Sussex (1892) (Tower rebuilt)

=== Publications ===
- Ferrey, Benjamin; Brayley, E. W. (1834). The Antiquities of the Priory of Christchurch: Consisting of Plans, Elevations, Sections, Details, and Perspective Views.
- Ferrey, Benjamin (1861). Recollections of A. N. Welby Pugin and his father Augustus Pugin; with notices of their works. London: Edward Stanford.
- Ferrey, Benjamin (1864). "Some remarks upon the works of the early mediaeval architects, Gundulph, Flambard, William of Sens, and others". Papers Read at the Royal Institute of British Architects 1863-64: 127–143.
- Ferrey, Benjamin (1878). "Wrexham". Journal of the British Archaeological Association. 34 (2): 168–170. doi:10.1080/00681288.1878.11887913.

== Ancestors ==
Ancestors of Benjamin Ferrey

16. Simon Ferrye (1662–1725)
8. George Ferrey (1708–77)
17. Elizabeth Frank
4. George Ferrey (1737–1805)
9. Christiana Sansom (died 1758)
2. Benjamin Ferrey (1779–1847)
10. Benjamin Sparks (1704–77)
5. Martha Sparks (1737–1788)
11. Martha (1700–86)
1. Benjamin Ferrey (1810–80)
6. William Pillgrem
3. Ann Pillgrem (1773–1824)
7. Mary Richman (1732–1821)

== Bibliography ==
- Eastlake, Charles (1872). A History of the Gothic Revival. London: Longman, Green & Co. p. 220.
- Elleray, D. Robert (2004). Sussex Places of Worship. Worthing, Sussex: Optimus Books. ISBN 0-9533132-7-1.
- Nairn, Ian; Pevsner, Nikolaus (1965). Sussex. The Buildings of England. Harmondsworth: Penguin Books. ISBN 0-14-071028-0.
- Newman, John; Pevsner, Nikolaus (1972). Dorset. The Buildings of England. Harmondsworth: Penguin Books. ISBN 0-14-071044-2.
- Pevsner, Nikolaus (1952). London. The Buildings of England. Vol. 2 Except the Cities of London and Westminster. Harmondsworth: Penguin Books. ISBN 0-14-071006-X.
- Pevsner, Nikolaus (1958). Shropshire. The Buildings of England. Harmondsworth: Penguin Books.
- Pevsner, Nikolaus (1958). North Somerset and Bristol. The Buildings of England. Harmondsworth: Penguin Books.
- Pevsner, Nikolaus (1958). South and West Somerset. The Buildings of England. Harmondsworth: Penguin Books.
- Pevsner, Nikolaus (1960). Leicestershire and Rutland. The Buildings of England. Harmondsworth: Penguin Books. p. 59.
- Pevsner, Nikolaus (1966). Berkshire. The Buildings of England. Harmondsworth: Penguin Books.
- Pevsner, Nikolaus (1968). Worcestershire. The Buildings of England. Harmondsworth: Penguin Books.
- Pevsner, Nikolaus (1973) [1960]. Buckinghamshire. The Buildings of England. Harmondsworth: Penguin Books.
- Pevsner, Nikolaus; Cherry, Bridget (revision) (1989) [1952]. Devon. The Buildings of England. Harmondsworth: Penguin Books. ISBN 0-14-071050-7.
- Pevsner, Nikolaus; Cherry, Bridget (revision) (1973) [1961]. Northamptonshire. The Buildings of England. Harmondsworth: Penguin Books. ISBN 0-14-071022-1.
- Pevsner, Nikolaus; Cherry, Bridget (revision) (1975) [1963]. Wiltshire. The Buildings of England. Harmondsworth: Penguin Books. ISBN 0140710264.
- Pevsner, Nikolaus; Harris, John (1964). Lincolnshire. The Buildings of England. Harmondsworth: Penguin Books.
- Pevsner, Nikolaus; Lloyd, David (1967). Hampshire and the Isle of Wight. The Buildings of England. Harmondsworth: Penguin Books.
- Pevsner, Nikolaus; Richmond, Ian A (1957). Northumberland. The Buildings of England. Harmondsworth: Penguin Books.
- Pevsner, Nikolaus; Wedgwood, Alexandra (1966). Warwickshire. The Buildings of England. Harmondsworth: Penguin Books. ISBN 0-14-071031-0.
- Pevsner, Nikolaus; Williamson, Elizabeth (1978) [1953]. Derbyshire. The Buildings of England. Harmondsworth: Penguin Books. pp. 157, 315. ISBN 0-14-071008-6.
- Sherwood, Jennifer; Pevsner, Nikolaus (1974). Oxfordshire. The Buildings of England. Harmondsworth: Penguin Books. ISBN 0-14-071045-0.
