= Humphrey Colles =

16th-century English politician

Humphrey Colles (by 1510 – c. 1570), of Barton Grange (Corfe, Somerset) and Nether Stowey, Somerset, was an English lawyer, land agent and politician during the reign of Mary I. Colles served as MP for Somerset in 1554-54 and High Sheriff of Somerset in 1557–58.

Parliament of England
Preceded by Sir John Sydenham; Edward Waldegrave	Member of Parliament for Somerset; 1554; With: Edward Waldegrave	Succeeded by Ralph Hopton; Sir John St Loe
