= Wookey Hole =

Village in Somerset, England

Coordinates: 51.2238°N 2.6744°W

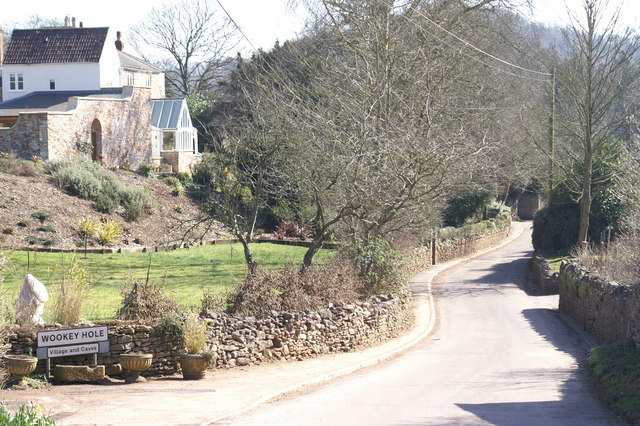
- Entrance to Wookey Hole village

- Location within Somerset
- OS grid reference: ST530474
- Civil parish: St Cuthbert Out
- Unitary authority: Somerset Council
- Ceremonial county: Somerset
- Region: South West
- Country: England
- Sovereign state: United Kingdom
- Post town: Wells
- Postcode district: BA5
- Dialling code: 01749
- Police: Avon and Somerset
- Fire: Devon and Somerset
- Ambulance: South Western
- UK Parliament: Wells and Mendip Hills

Wookey Hole is a village in Somerset, England. It is the location of the Wookey Hole show caves.

== Location ==
Wookey Hole is located in the civil parish of St Cuthbert Out. It is one mile north-west of the city of Wells, and lies on the border of the Mendip Hills Area of Outstanding Natural Beauty (AONB).

== Toponymy ==
One possible origin for the name Wookey is from the Old English wocig (an animal trap), although it is also a possible alteration from a Celtic word ogo (cave), referring to Wookey Hole Caves.

== Features ==
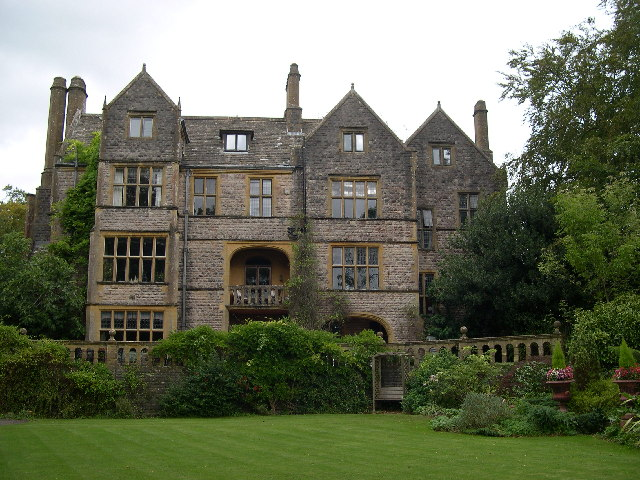
Glencot House

The village of Wookey Hole is dominated by the Wookey Hole Caves tourist site which has show caves and a controversial crazy golf course which was built on the site of the village bowling green.

The village has shops, a pub, restaurants, hotels and a campsite. The Grade II listed Church of St Mary Magdalene dates to 1873-74.

The former paper mill building, whose water wheel is powered by a small canal from the river, dates from around 1860 and is a Grade II-listed building. The production of handmade paper ceased in February 2008 after the owner Gerry Cottle concluded there was no longer a market for the product, and therefore sold most of the historic machinery.

Glencot House is a Grade II listed country house dating from 1887, by Ernest George and Harold Peto, for W. S. Hodgkinson. A report of the building appeared in The Building News, 13 May 1887; the architect's drawing was exhibited at the Royal Academy, and is now at RIBA.

The 18th-century Bubwith farmhouse is also a Grade II listed building, as is the post office in the High Street.

The Monarch's Way and Mendip Way long-distance footpaths both pass through the village, as does National Cycle Route 3. Ebbor Gorge National Nature Reserve is just outside the village.
