= St John's Church, Tincleton =

Church in Dorset, England

St John's Church
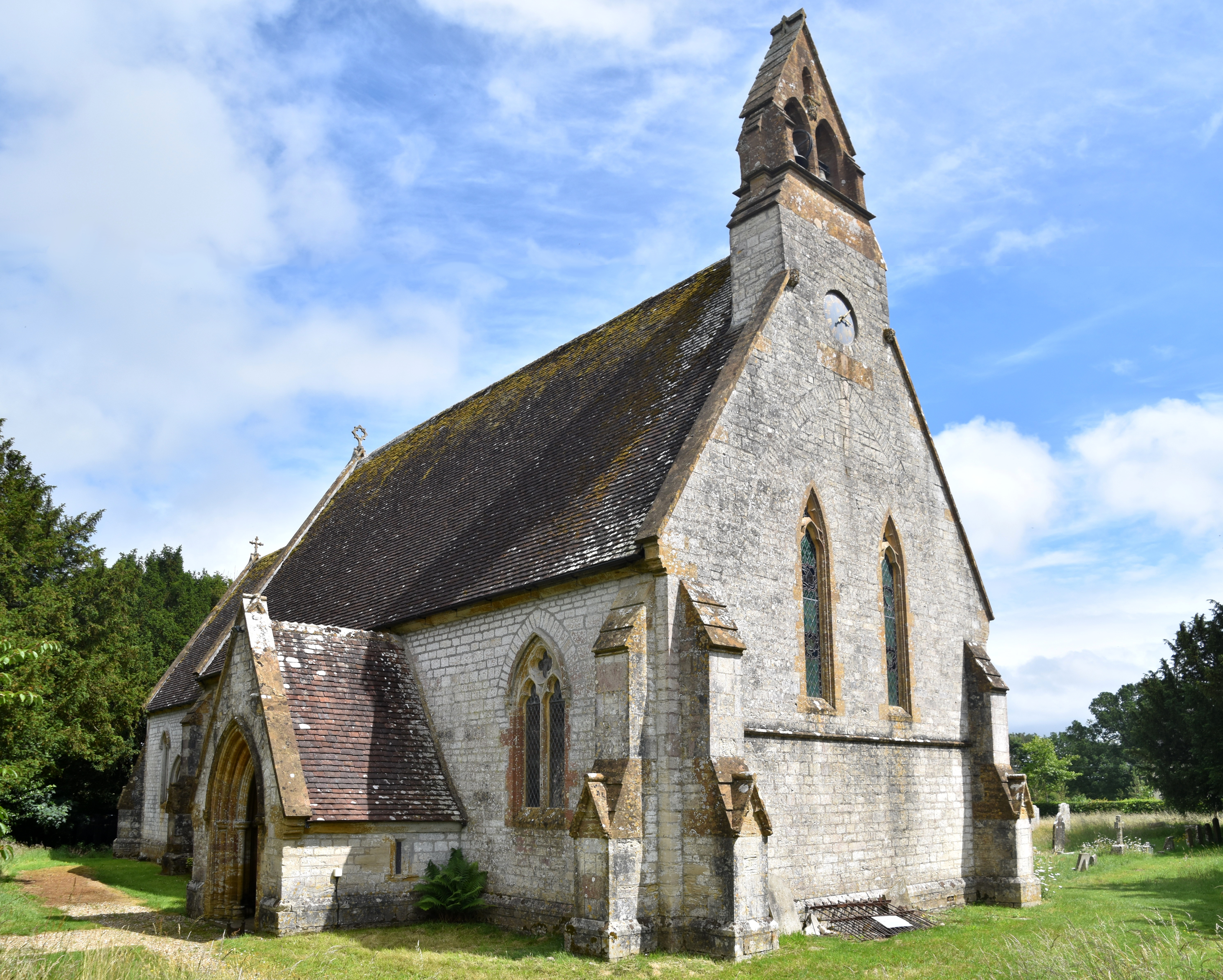

Religion
- Affiliation: Church of England
- Ecclesiastical or organizational status: Active
- Year consecrated: 1850

Location
- Location: Tincleton, Dorset, England
- Interactive map of St John's Church
- Coordinates: 50.7255°N 2.3190°W

Architecture
- Architect: Benjamin Ferrey
- Type: Church
- Style: Early Decorated

St John's Church is a Church of England church in Tincleton, Dorset, England. It was designed by Benjamin Ferrey and built in 1849–50. The church has been a Grade II listed building since 1956.

== History ==
St John's was built to replace an earlier church which was considered "unsightly and inconvenient". The decision to replace the old church was made by the end of 1847, with drawings for a "chaste and handsome" new church having been made by Benjamin Ferrey. A plot of land for the new church was given by Charles Sturt of Crichel House and Charles Porcher of Clyffe House paid for its construction.

Construction of the new church began in 1849 and the parish's services were temporarily moved to the nearby schoolroom. St John's and its burial ground was consecrated by the Bishop of Salisbury, the Right Rev. Edward Denison, on 1 November 1850.

== Architecture ==
St John's is built of squared and coursed rubble, with Hamstone dressings and tiled roofs. It is made up of a nave, chancel, vestry and north porch. The church has a west bell-cot containing two bells, with a clock below.

Some of the old church's fittings and memorials were transferred to the new church. The font is made from Purbeck stone and has been dated to the 12th-century, although it has since been reshaped. The stem and base of the font is of 19th or 20th-century date. On the north wall of the chancel is a monument to Anne Seymour, dated 1844, along with two marble tablets made by Lester of Dorchester; one to Rev. Thomas Seymour, dated 1849, and the other to Jane Seymour, dated 1850. On the north wall of the nave is a marble monument to Rachel Baynard, dated 1667, and another to George Baynard, dated 1693. The south wall has a monument to Maria White, dated 1718. The nave contains two floor slabs to Thomas Baynard, dated 1683, and Radolphus Baynard, dated 1695.

The church's organ was built in 1885 by Maley, Young & Oldknow of London. It was first used in the church on 6 December 1885 and was later restored by Geo. Osmond & Co of Taunton in 1969. In 1889, Mrs. Porcher had a reredos erected in the church in memory of Charles Porcher. The chancel has a memorial window to Vice-Chancellor Sir Richard Torin Kindersley, who died in 1879. It was placed by E. L. Kindersley of Clyffe House.
