= Church of St John the Baptist, Yeovil =

Parish church in Somerset, England

Church of St John the Baptist
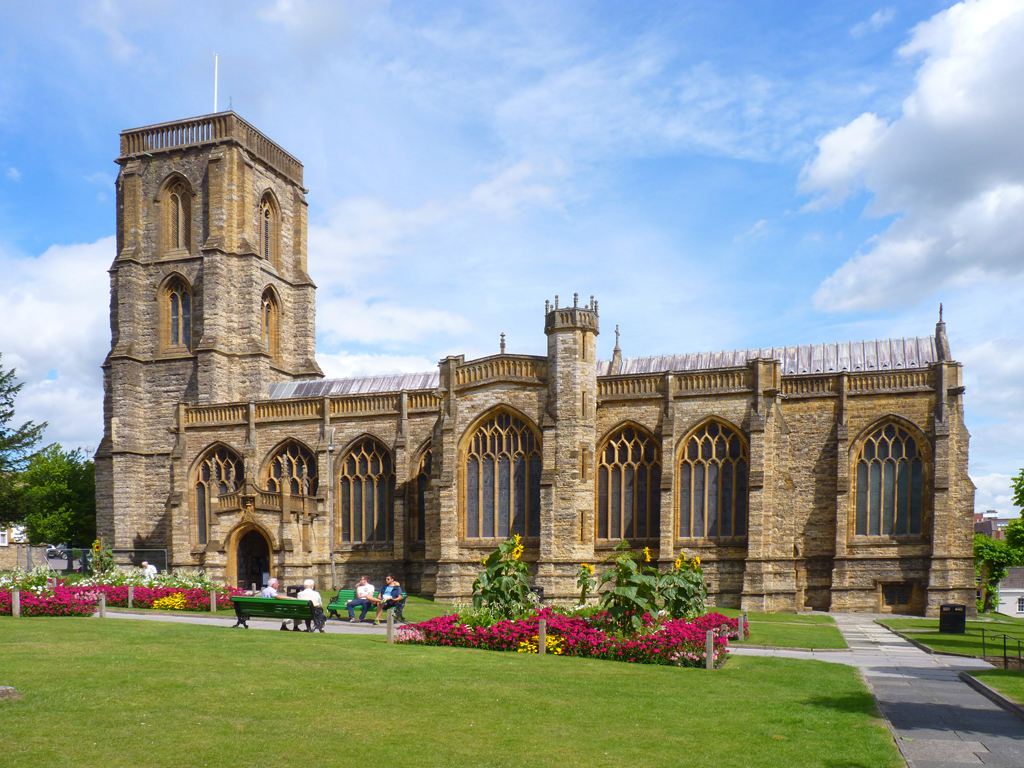

- Location within Somerset
- 50°56′30″N 2°37′53″W
- Location: BA20 1HE, Yeovil, Somerset, England

History
- Built: Late 14th century

Listed Building – Grade I
- Official name: Church of St John the Baptist
- Designated: 19 March 1951
- Reference no.: 1055713

The Church of St John the Baptist in Yeovil, Somerset, is a Church of England parish church.

The church was built between 1380 and 1405, but was renovated in the 1850s. It has been designated as a Grade I listed building. The tower, which was built around 1480, is 92 feet (28 m) high, in four stages with set-back offset corner buttresses. It is thought that the work was supervised by William Wynford, master mason of Wells Cathedral. To meet the growing size of Yeovil and the increased population, work on a second church, Holy Trinity, began on 24 June 1843, and this relieved the pressures on St John's. In 1863, shortage of space in the graveyard was alleviated by the opening of the Preston Road cemetery.

The church is capped by openwork balustrading matching the parapets which are from the 17th century. Major reconstruction work was undertaken from 1851 to 1860. The tower has two-light late 14th century windows on all sides at bell-ringing and bell-chamber levels, the latter having fine pierced stonework grilles. There is a stair turret to the north-west corner, with a weather vane termination. Among the fourteen bells are two dating from 1728 and made by Thomas Bilbie of the Bilbie family in Chew Stoke. Another from the same date, the "Great Bell", was recast in 2013, from 4,502 pounds (2,042 kg; 321.6 st) to 4,992 lb (2,264 kg; 356.6 st).

Because of the state of some of the external masonry the church has been added to the Heritage at Risk Register.

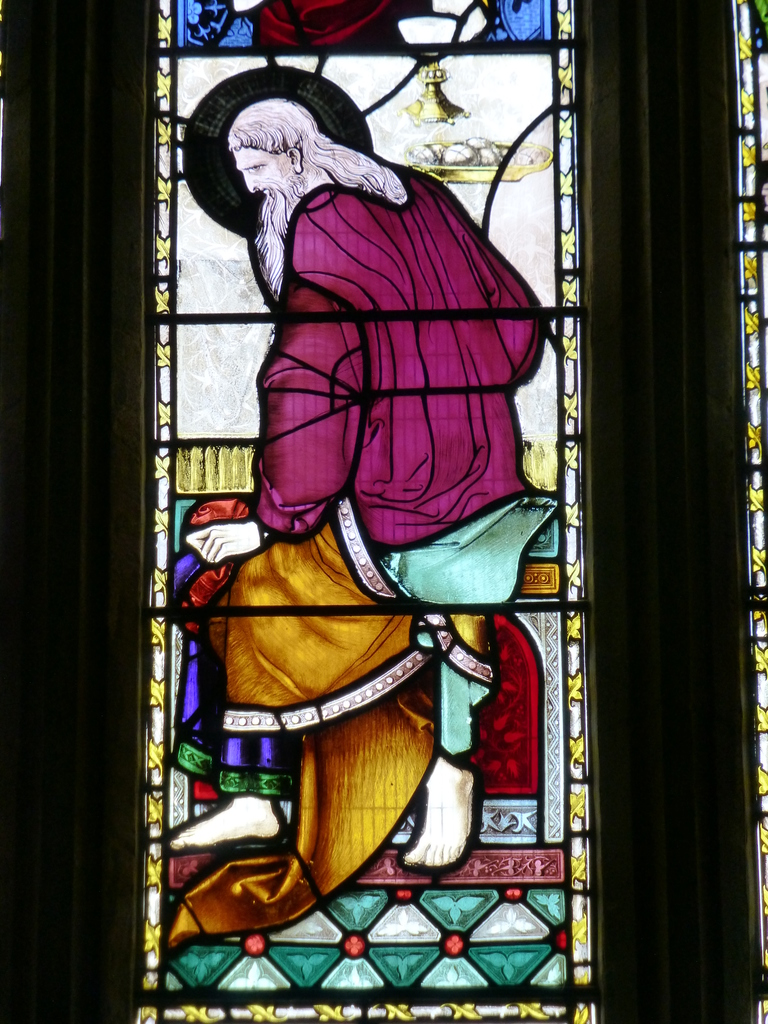
In the Church of St John the Baptist, Yeovil, one stained glass window depicts Judas with a black halo.

Unusually, the stained glass windows include a depiction of a lone Judas Iscariot with a dark halo. Inside the church is a brass reading desk originally made in East Anglia.

The parish is part of a benefice with St Andrew, Yeovil, in the Diocese of Bath and Wells. A Member of the South West Gospel Partnership, it has an evangelical character.

== The Chantry ==
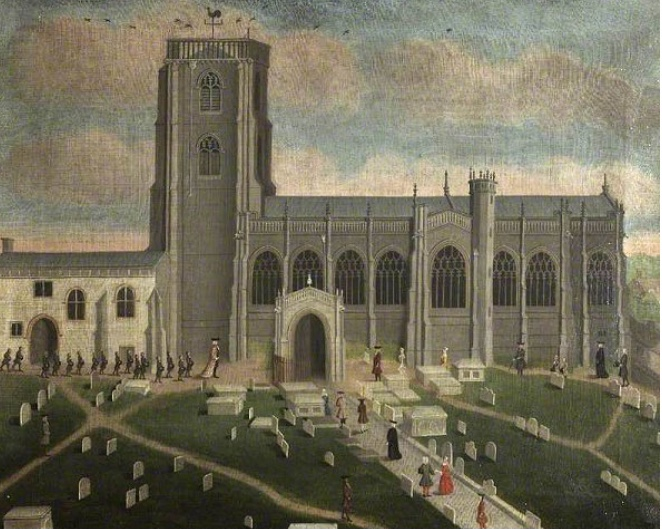
St John's Church, with Chantry attached, showing schoolmaster and boys, c. 1750

In 1573, the Chantry of St Mary the Virgin in the churchyard of the parish church was fitted out as a schoolroom by the parish. This developed into a charity school. In 1855, the schoolroom was demolished and replaced by a new building next to the churchyard, also called the Chantry, which had feoffees who appointed a schoolmaster. When the old schoolroom was demolished, it was estimated to date from the reign of Richard III, and some of its features, including two chimneypieces, were salvaged and built into the new Chantry, while the roof structure was copied. By stages, the charity school morphed into Yeovil Grammar School, which closed in 1907 with the retirement of its schoolmaster.

== See also ==
- List of Grade I listed buildings in South Somerset
- List of towers in Somerset
- List of ecclesiastical parishes in the Diocese of Bath and Wells
