= Holy Trinity Church, Dorchester =

Church in Dorset, England

Holy Trinity Church
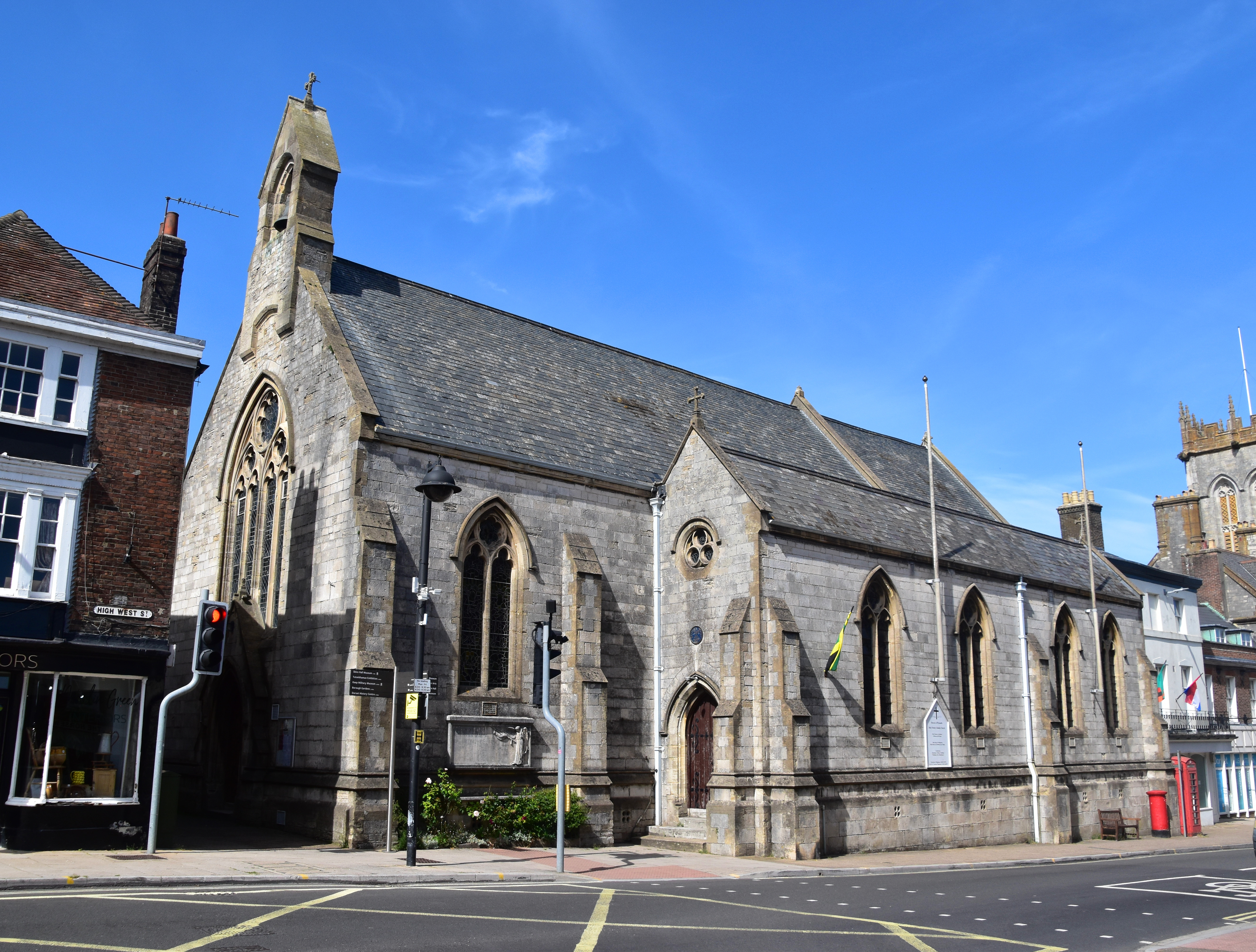
- Holy Trinity Church

Religion
- Affiliation: Roman Catholic (formerly Church of England)
- Ecclesiastical or organizational status: Active

Location
- Location: Dorchester, Dorset, England
- Interactive map of Holy Trinity Church
- Coordinates: 50.7155°N 2.4379°W

Architecture
- Architect: Benjamin Ferrey
- Type: Church
- Completed: 1876

Holy Trinity Church is a Roman Catholic and former Church of England church in Dorchester, Dorset, England. Built in 1875–76 to the designs of Benjamin Ferrey, it was declared redundant by the Church of England in 1975 and reopened the following year as a Roman Catholic church. It has been a Grade II listed building since 1975.

== History ==
The site of Holy Trinity has been occupied by a church since at least the 11th century, when reference was made to it the Domesday Book. A rebuilding of the church took place in 1824 and the new building made up of a nave without aisles or a chancel. Over the course of the 19th century, galleries were added to increase its accommodation to around 470 persons, however the church was in need of expansion or replacement by the 1870s. Funding was raised by public subscription and grants, including from the Diocesan Church Building Society and Incorporated Church Building Society.

Holy Trinity was rebuilt to the designs of Benjamin Ferrey and made approximately double its former size. The work, which commenced in March 1875 and cost £4,500, was carried out by Messrs Tilley Brothers of Dorchester, with Mr. E. Miles of Charminster as the clerk of works. Holy Trinity reopened on 31 May 1876, with the first service of the day being early communion, followed by a morning service. The opening ceremony was attended by the Bishop of Salisbury, the Right Rev. George Moberly, who preached during the morning service. A luncheon was then held in the town's Corn Exchange and later followed by an evening service. The workmen involved in the church's construction were provided with their own evening dinner at the Antelope Hotel.

Holy Trinity's organ was still being built by Messrs William Hill & Sons at the time of the church's opening, resulting in the temporary use of an American harmonium. The organ of the 1824 church was rejected for refitting in the new building due to its "defective" condition. The formal opening of the new organ was celebrated with two special services held on 19 October 1876.

In 1899–1900, the south transept was converted into a side chapel, with the work carried out by Messrs Norman and Burt of Burgess Hill to the designs of Charles Eamer Kempe and paid for by Miss Ashley of Stratton Manor. Many of the new fittings were carved from oak, including an open-work screen, panelled wainscoting and sedilia. In 1900, the choir stalls, pulpit, reading desk, communion rails and font of the church were relocated to the newly erected Ashley Chapel at the Dorchester Workhouse and new replacements added to Holy Trinity at the expense of Miss Ashley.

Reredos were added to the church in 1897 as a memorial to Rev. H. Everett, rector of the parish until 1896. In 1906, Thomas Hardy presented the rector of the time, Rev. Rowland Hill, his own sketched plans of a tower for the church. The writer and former architect expressed a wish that "some wealthy lover of architecture" would carry out the proposal, however it never came to fruition. After World War I, a tablet of Portland stone was added to the exterior of the church to commemorate the men of the parish who lost their lives in the conflict.

Holy Trinity was declared redundant on 1 May 1975 and then sold to the Roman Catholic Diocese of Plymouth, who at the time were in need of greater accommodation than their existing Dorchester church, Our Lady Queen of Martyrs and St Michael, could afford. The sale of the church was completed in May 1976 and restoration plans drawn up by Anthony Jaggard of John Stark & Partners in Dorchester. A number of fittings were installed from the original Roman Catholic church, including an onyx marble altar and the Stations of the Cross. Holy Trinity reopened on 28 May 1976 when mass was celebrated by Father M. Joseph O'Brien.

== Architecture ==
Holy Trinity is largely built of Pokeswell stone, with dressings of Portland stone (reused from the previous church) and Box Ground Bath Stone, and slate roofs, while Bath stone from Corsham Down is used internally. Built to accommodate 625 persons, the church is made up of a four-bay nave with north and south aisles, and chancel, with vestry, organ chamber and south aisle. Owing to the difficult site and limited space from surrounding development, the chancel's size had to be restricted and the nave's south aisle shorter than its northern counterpart. The nave and chancel is divided by shafts of black-polished Devonshire marble. Encaustic tiles from Godwin of Lugwardine are used on the floor of the chancel and old Portland memorial stones in the remainder of the church.

All original fittings, except the lectern and font, were created according to Ferrey's designs, and many furnishings were gifted. The woodwork fittings were created under the personal supervision of Mr. Tilley, while carvings in wood and stone was executed by Mr. Frank Witcombe of Bristol. The open benches were made from stained and varnished deal, while the chancel benches was made to include moulded oak ends and fronts. All original windows were glazed with rolled Cathedral glass.

The original octagonal font of Caen stone was carved and gifted by Mr. Grassby of Dorchester as a memorial to four of his children who died in their infancy in 1870. The upper part of the original pulpit was of English oak and the moulded base of red Mansfield stone, with steps of Portland stone. The lectern was gifted by the two daughters of Rev. George Wood, the rector of Holy Trinity until 1847, in memory of their father. The polished brass used to create the lectern was supplied by Mr. Wippell of Exeter. The reading desk was carved from oak obtained from Wolveton House and gifted by Mr. Miles. The communion rail of brass, iron and oak was created by Mr. Singer of Frome and the furnishings within the rails gifted by Mr. and Mrs. A. Spicer.

A number of fittings and features from the previous church were also installed inside the new building, including a bell of 1732, made by the Bilbie family, an oak chest of 1683 in the nave and various monuments, largely dating to the first half of the 19th century.

The church became a listed building in 1975. Historic England considers the church to be a "well-detailed and well-executed example of Gothic Revival architecture with "good detailing and use of materials" and "good craftsmanship" displayed in its decorative embellishment.
