= Lydford-on-Fosse =

Village and civil parish in Somerset, England

Coordinates: 51.07217°N 2.62225°W

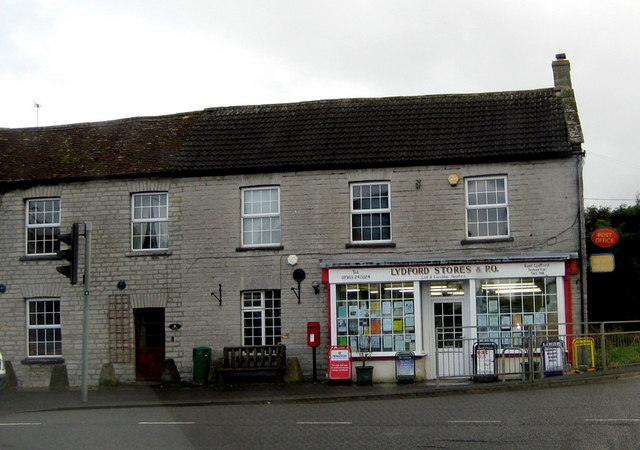
- Lydford stores

- Location within Somerset
- Population: 511 (2011)
- OS grid reference: ST565305
- Unitary authority: Somerset Council
- Ceremonial county: Somerset
- Region: South West
- Country: England
- Sovereign state: United Kingdom
- Post town: SOMERTON
- Postcode district: TA11
- Dialling code: 01963
- Police: Avon and Somerset
- Fire: Devon and Somerset
- Ambulance: South Western
- UK Parliament: Glastonbury and Somerton

Lydford-on-Fosse is a village and civil parish in the county of Somerset, England. The parish includes the village of West Lydford and hamlet of East Lydford.

== History ==
Lydford-on-Fosse straddles the Fosse Way, an ancient Roman road which linked the cities of Lincoln and Exeter. The village takes its name from two Saxon words, Lyd torrent or noisy stream and Ford a passage crossing a river, and was established before the Norman Conquest. The villages of East and West Lydford are to the east and west of the ford which was where the Fosse Way crossed the river Brue.

A place where a river could be forded became a meeting place and a centre for trade and the granting of a charter for a fair and weekly market in the reign of Henry III (1216–1272) suggests that Lydford was already a place of some importance by that time. Fair Place, West Lydford, is where the fair was held. The Manor of West Lydford was bequeathed by the 4th Earl of Derby in his will of 1593 to his second son the Hon William Stanley of Lathom, Lancashire. In 1594 William became the 6th Earl on the sudden death of his older brother Ferdinando the 5th Earl. At least 1800 years of recorded history of East and West Lydford, with entries for both in Domesday Book, have led to the Parish now known as Lydford on Fosse.

The parish of West Lydford was part of the hundred of Catsash, while East Lydford was in Somerton Hundred.

The modern A37 trunk road follows the route of the ancient Fosse Way through the parish.

== Governance ==
The parish council has responsibility for local issues, including setting an annual precept (local rate) to cover the council's operating costs and producing annual accounts for public scrutiny. The parish council evaluates local planning applications and works with the local police, district council officers, and neighbourhood watch groups on matters of crime, security, and traffic. The parish council's role also includes initiating projects for the maintenance and repair of parish facilities, as well as consulting with the district council on the maintenance, repair, and improvement of highways, drainage, footpaths, public transport, and street cleaning. Conservation matters (including trees and listed buildings) and environmental issues are also the responsibility of the council.

For local government purposes, since 1 April 2023, the parish comes under the unitary authority of Somerset Council. Prior to this, it was part of the non-metropolitan district of Mendip (established under the Local Government Act 1972). It was part of Shepton Mallet Rural District before 1974.

It is also part of the Glastonbury and Somerton county constituency represented in the House of Commons of the Parliament of the United Kingdom. It elects one Member of Parliament (MP) by the first past the post system of election.

== Facilities ==
Lydford on Fosse is served by a pub (the Cross Keys), petrol station (with shop) and a motorhome shop.

== Religious sites ==
The Church of St Mary in East Lydford was built in 1866 by Benjamin Ferrey for the rector, J. J. Moss. It was last used for worship in 1987 and has been privately owned since 1993. The building is Grade II listed, but is disused and derelict, and is described in the Mendip District Council Buildings at Risk Register as being in 'poor' condition and possibly being structurally unsound.

Ferrey also built the Anglican parish Church of St Peter on the site of an earlier church in the village of West Lydford.
