= Holy Trinity Church, Yeovil =

Church in Somerset, England

Holy Trinity Church
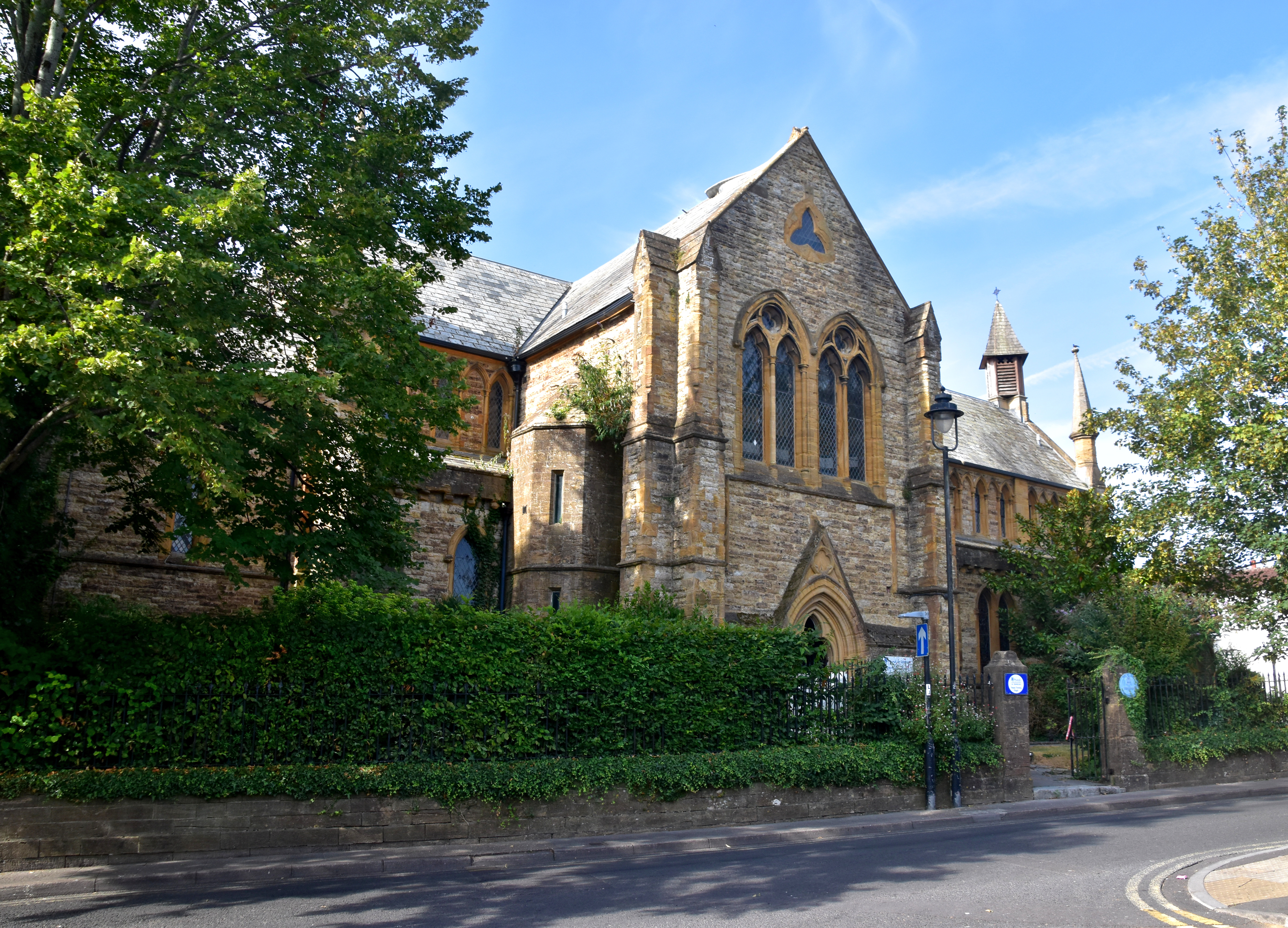

Religion
- Affiliation: Church of England
- Ecclesiastical or organisational status: Redundant, now Yeovil Foyer
- Year consecrated: 1846

Location
- Location: Yeovil, Somerset, England
- Country: United Kingdom
- Interactive map of Holy Trinity Church
- Coordinates: 50.9406°N 2.6305°W

Architecture
- Architect: Benjamin Ferrey
- Type: Church
- Style: Early English

Listed Building – Grade II
- Official name: The Church of the Holy Trinity, Yeovil
- Designated: 17 October 1983
- Reference no.: 1173316

Holy Trinity Church is a former Church of England church at Yeovil, Somerset, England. The church was designed by Benjamin Ferrey and was built between 1843 and 1846. It is a Grade II listed building.

== History ==
Holy Trinity Church was built to provide Yeovil with increased church accommodation at a time when the Church of St John the Baptist was unable to sufficiently serve the town's growing population. The plans for the new church were drawn up by architect Benjamin Ferrey with accommodation for 940 people; 670 seats for adults and 270 seats for children in the transept galleries. The foundation stone was laid on 24 June 1843 and the church was built by Mr Davis of Langport.

The ecclesiastical parish of Hendford was formed on 22 September 1846, with Holy Trinity as the parish church, and the completed church was consecrated by the Bishop of Bath and Wells, Richard Bagot, on 28 October 1846.

The church's interior underwent alteration and rearrangement in the 1970s, which included the removal of the pulpit, choir stalls and pews and the addition of new seating. The church closed as a place of worship in 1995, with a final service held on 30 April 1995. The congregation, along with that of St Mary's and All Saints' Church at Wraxhill Road, was subsequently moved to the new Holy Trinity Church at Lysander Road, which opened in 1998.

In 1995–1996, the Knightstone Housing Association undertook a £900,000 scheme to refurbish, convert and extend the church to form the Yeovil Foyer. This facility provided up to 39 homeless and unemployed young adults with accommodation while undertaking training and work experience. The scheme was carried out in partnership with South Somerset District Council and West Dorset District Council, alongside a number of other public and private organisations. The work was carried out by F. R. Bartlett Construction to the designs of architects Boon Brown Partnership. The majority of the accommodation was provided in two new blocks connected to the south side of the church (facing South Street), with the church building largely providing catering, meeting and office space.

Yeovil Foyer opened in 1996 and closed in 2016. The building was then auctioned off in 2020, and was purchased by the mental health charity Mind in Somerset, who operate it as the wellbeing hub Yeovil Foyer. The accommodation blocks provide a six-bed mental health crisis house operated by Rethink Mental Illness.

== Architecture ==
Holy Trinity Church is built of local Hamstone with slate roofs. It was designed with a cruciform plan, containing a four-bay nave, north and south aisles, north and south transepts, a chancel, north porch, and a single-bell turret at the west end. Although most of the church's fittings have now been removed, it retains numerous stained glass windows.
