= Melplash =

Village in Dorset, England

Coordinates: 50.783218°N 2.730611°W

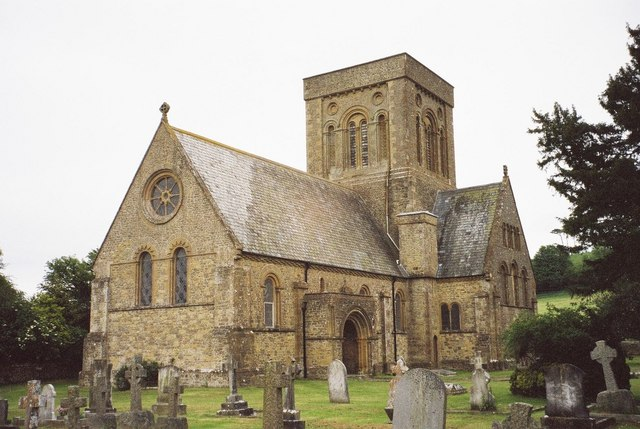
- Christ's Church, Melplash

- Location within Dorset
- OS grid reference: SY485985
  - London: 145 miles (233 km)
- Civil parish: Netherbury
- Unitary authority: Dorset
- Ceremonial county: Dorset
- Region: South West
- Country: England
- Sovereign state: United Kingdom
- Post town: BRIDPORT
- Postcode district: DT6
- Dialling code: 01308
- Police: Dorset
- Fire: Dorset and Wiltshire
- Ambulance: South Western
- UK Parliament: West Dorset

Melplash is a village in western Dorset, England. It is situated on the A3066 road 3 miles (4.8 km) north of Bridport and 2 miles (3.2 km) south of Beaminster.

The construction of Christ Church between 1845 and 1846 was funded by James Bandinel (who was at one time secretary to William Wilberforce) in memory of his father, who had been vicar of Melplash and the neighbouring village of Netherbury. The church was designed by Benjamin Ferrey and built in Neo-Norman style.

There was once a flax industry in the village. An annual agricultural show held in August by the name of The Melplash Agricultural Show started in the village in the 19th century but is now held on fields owned by the Melplash Agricultural Show Society at nearby West Bay.

In 1938, the Melplash Players theatre group "had the advantage of coaching and casting" from Gertrude Bugler, previously of The Hardy Players.
