= Woodsford =

Village and civil parish in Dorset, England

Coordinates: 50.714°N 2.338°W

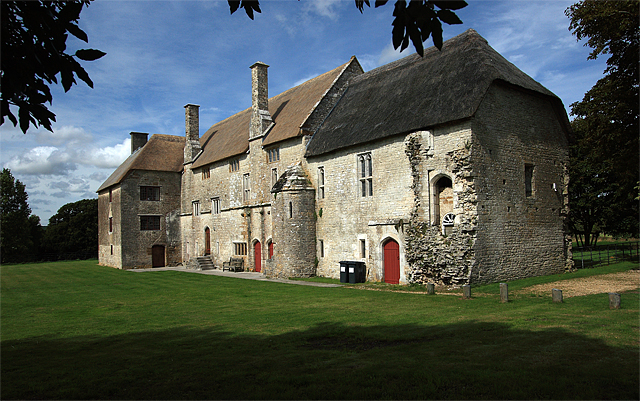
- Woodsford Castle

- Location within Dorset
- Population: 80 (2013 estimate)
- OS grid reference: SY762905
- Civil parish: Woodsford
- Unitary authority: Dorset
- Ceremonial county: Dorset
- Region: South West
- Country: England
- Sovereign state: United Kingdom
- Post town: Dorchester
- Postcode district: DT2
- Dialling code: 01305
- Police: Dorset
- Fire: Dorset and Wiltshire
- Ambulance: South Western
- UK Parliament: South Dorset

Woodsford is a village and civil parish beside the River Frome, Dorset, England, about 4 miles (6.4 km) east of the county town Dorchester. Dorset County Council's 2013 mid-year estimate of the parish population is 80.

== Manor ==
The Domesday Book of 1086 records the manor as Waredesford, which the 18th-century historian John Hutchins interpreted as meaning a ford across the Varia, an alternative name for the River Frome. More recent opinion is that Waredesford referred to a ford belonging to a man named Weard. Two holdings were recorded, which have been interpreted as corresponding to East Woodsford (the current village) and West Woodsford (now Woodsford Castle).

Woodsford Castle is the surviving range of a 14th-century fortified manor house. King Edward III granted William de Whitefield a licence to crenellate in 1335. The house has the largest thatched roof in the county and has been restored by the Landmark Trust. The house is a Grade I listed building.

== Parish church ==
The Church of England parish church of St John the Baptist was 13th-century, but was largely rebuilt in 1862–63 to designs by the Gothic Revival architect Thomas Henry Wyatt. Remnants of the 13th-century church include the lower part of the west tower and an Early English Gothic lancet on the south side of the nave west of the south porch. The parish is part of the Benefice of Moreton, Woodsford and Crossways with Tincleton.

== Economic history ==
In the Frome Valley at Woodsford there used to be a system of watermeadows.

== Demography ==
Dorset County Council's 2013 mid-year estimate of the parish population is 80. The 2001 Census recorded the parish's population as 67. In the 2011 census figures for Woodsford parish have been combined with those of neighbouring Tincleton parish; the population in this combined area was 236.

== Sources ==
- Newman, John; Pevsner, Nikolaus (1972). Dorset. The Buildings of England. Harmondsworth: Penguin Books. pp. 494–495. ISBN 0-14-071044-2.
- RCHME, ed. (1970). "Woodsford". An Inventory of the Historical Monuments in the County of Dorset. Vol. 2 – South East. London: Royal Commission on the Historical Monuments of England. pp. 397–402.
- Wightman, Ralph (1983) [1965]. Portrait of Dorset. Portrait Books (4 ed.). London: Robert Hale. p. 49. ISBN 0-7090-0844-9.
