= James Bandinel (civil servant) =

- Born: 1783; St Peter in the East, Oxford
- Died: 1849 (aged 65–66); 19 Berkeley Square, Mayfair, London
- Occupations: Official at the Foreign Office, London, and superintendent of its slave trade department for the abolition of the slave trade

James Bandinel (1783–1849) was a British official at the Foreign Office, London, and superintendent of its slave trade department for the abolition of the slave trade.

== Early life ==
He was born in January 1783 in the parish of St Peter in the East, Oxford, second son of Dr James Bandinel by his wife Margaret, née Dumaresq.

== Career ==
He entered the Foreign Office as a Clerk in 1799 and became Superintendent of the Slave Trade Department. In 1807, Parliament voted to abolish the slave trade, and in 1833 slavery itself was abolished in the British Empire.

Bandinel's role was to supervise its suppression. From 1824 to his retirement in 1841, he received an annual allowance from Parliament, together with a lump sum of £1000, raised from the sale of condemned slave ships.

== Marriage and family ==
Bandinel married, in 1813, Marian Eliza, daughter of Rev Dr Robert Hunter of Okeford Fitzpaine, Dorset. The pair separated under two years later and their young son, James, spent his childhood in six-month stays with each parent.

== Philanthropy ==
Bandinel was a lifelong benefactor. He was instrumental in the construction of the Thames Tunnel (1828) through his close friendship with—and financial support of—Marc Isambard Brunel. In 1845, he provided land for the construction and endowment of a parish church at Melplash, Dorset. It had been an unfulfilled wish of his father to see the church built, and Bandinel saw it through to completion; the dedication ceremony was in 1846. He also donated land for a village school and schoolhouse.

== Death ==
Bandinel died on 29 July 1849 at his house in 19 Berkeley Square, Mayfair, London. He had contracted Asian cholera while staying in Salisbury. He was buried in the old St George's Hanover Square burial ground on Bayswater Road, London.
