= West Lydford =

Village in Somerset, England

Coordinates: 51.0829°N 2.6249°W

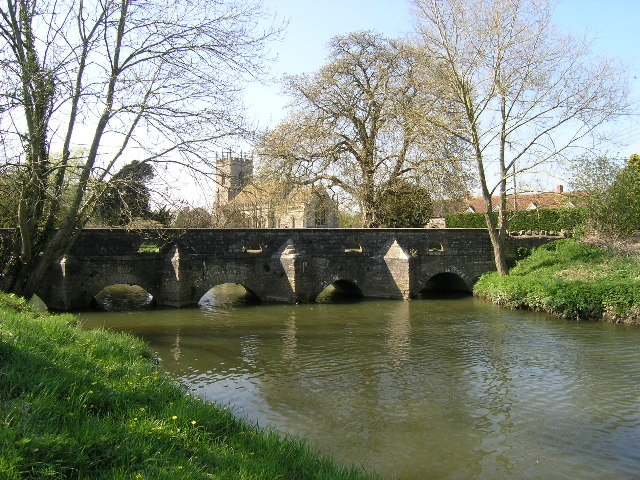
- The bridge over the River Brue and St Peter's Church

- Location within Somerset
- Civil parish: Lydford-on-Fosse
- Unitary authority: Somerset Council
- Ceremonial county: Somerset
- Region: South West
- Country: England
- Sovereign state: United Kingdom

West Lydford is a village and former civil parish, now in the parish of Lydford-on-Fosse in Somerset, England. The village is spread along a stretch of road called the High Street. At the north end of the village is a distinct group of houses known as Fair Place, on the site of a medieval fair.

In 1931 the parish had a population of 263. On 1 April 1933 the parish was abolished and merged with East Lydford to form "Lydford".

There are two old weirs in the area of the village, the larger, downstream, of which was refurbished in 2012 and provides a pool which is used for Open water swimming. The upstream weir was earlier lowered from its original height to prevent flooding on the A37, where the road crosses the River Brue.

The village is the site for the Lydford on Fosse parish hall, which is situated adjacent to the Church.

The current road bridge taking the High Street over the River Brue was built in the 17th century.
