= West Knighton, Dorset =

Village and civil parish in Dorset, England

Coordinates: 50.6878°N 2.3803°W

West Knighton
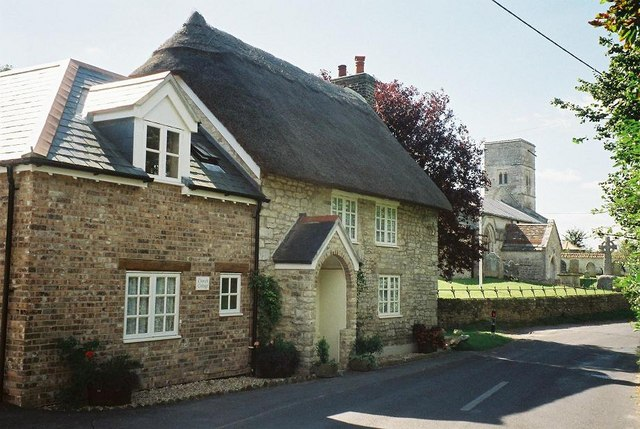
- West Knighton

- Location within Dorset
- Population: 375
- OS grid reference: SY733875
- Unitary authority: Dorset
- Ceremonial county: Dorset
- Region: South West
- Country: England
- Sovereign state: United Kingdom
- Post town: Dorchester
- Postcode district: DT2
- Police: Dorset
- Fire: Dorset and Wiltshire
- Ambulance: South Western
- UK Parliament: West Dorset

West Knighton is a village and civil parish in Dorset, England, situated 3 miles (4.8 km) southeast of the county town Dorchester. It has an 11th-century church and a village pub. In the 2011 census the civil parish had a population of 375.

The village name derives from the Old English cniht and tūn, meaning the village or farmstead of the young men or retainers. At Little Mayne Farm 0.5 miles (0.80 km) southwest of the village is the site of a deserted medieval village, which was recorded in the Domesday Book as Maine and in 1201 was known as Parva Maene.

West Knighton parish historically developed out of the amalgamation of four medieval settlements within the ancient hundred of Cullifordtree: the existing main village, the previously mentioned Parva Maene, another medieval settlement at Friarmayne to the south—also deserted and now within neighbouring Broadmayne civil parish—and the fourth at Lewell to the north (now just a farmhouse).
