= Charles Kendle =

English cricketer

Personal information
- Full name: Charles Edward Compton Kendle
- Born: 10 February 1875; Newton Tony, Wiltshire, England
- Died: 3 January 1954 (aged 78); Hellingly, Sussex, England
- Batting: Right-handed
- Role: Wicket-keeper
- Relatives: William Kendle (nephew)

Domestic team information
- Years: Team
- 1899: Hampshire
- 1911–1914: Wiltshire

Career statistics
Competition	First-class
Matches	2
Runs scored	27
Batting average	9.00
100s/50s	–/–
Top score	11
Catches/stumpings	2/1
- Source: Cricinfo, 1 January 2010

Charles Edward Compton Kendle (10 February 1875 — 3 January 1954) was an English first-class cricketer.

Kendle was born in the village of Newton Tony near Amesbury in February 1875. He made two appearances in first-class cricket for Hampshire in the 1899 County Championship, against Leicestershire at Leicester, and Yorkshire in the proceeding match at Bradford. Standing in as wicket-keeper for Charles Robson, he scored 27 runs in his two matches, while in his capacity as wicket-keeper he took two catches and made a single stumping. Kendle later played minor counties cricket for Wiltshire from 1911 to 1914, making five appearances in the Minor Counties Championship. Kendle died in January 1954 at Hellingly, Sussex. His nephew, William Kendle, also played first-class cricket.
