= Church of St Peter, Lydford-on-Fosse =

Church in Somerset, England

Church of St Peter
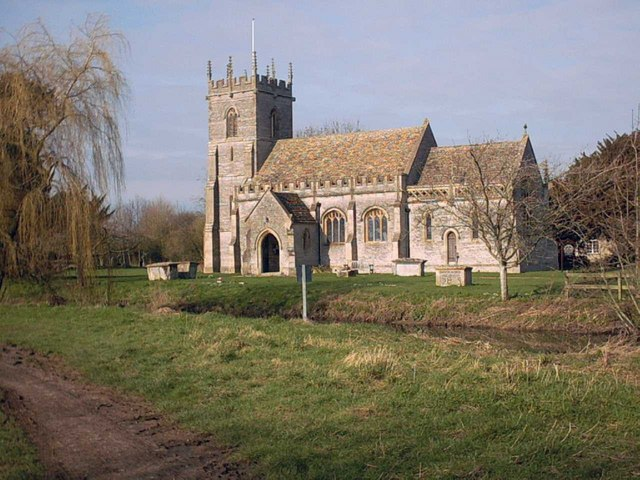

- Location within Somerset
- 51.0846°N 2.6229°W
- Location: Lydford-on-Fosse, Somerset, England

History
- Built: 1846

Site notes
- Architect: Benjamin Ferrey

Listed Building – Grade II*
- Official name: Church of St Peter
- Designated: 17 October 1985
- Reference no.: 1175052

The Church of St Peter in Lydford-on-Fosse, Somerset, England was built in 1846. It is a Grade II* listed building.

== History ==
The church was built in 1846, by Benjamin Ferrey, on the site of an earlier church. The previous medieval church, next to the River Brue had been flooded and was in disrepair.

The parish is part of the Wheathill Priory Group of parishes making up the benefice within the Diocese of Bath and Wells.

== Architecture ==
The stone building has Doulting stone dressings and a tile roof. It consists of a nave, chancel and north aisle. The west tower is supported by set-back buttresses. The tower contains a peal of six bells.

The interior of the church includes a 15th century font. Some of the memorial tablets are by Reeves of Bath. Some of the stained glass is by William Wailes.
