= Lukace Kendle =

American murderer

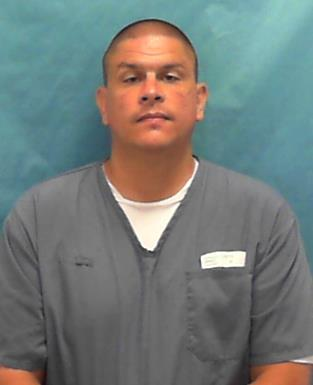
- Born: May 2, 1986 (age 40); United States
- Status: Incarcerated
- Motive: Unknown
- Convictions: Second degree murder attempted second degree murder
- Penalty: Life imprisonment without the possibility of parole plus 30 years

Details
- Date: June 1, 2012
- State: Florida
- Killed: Kijuan Byrd
- Injured: Michael Smathers

Lukace Kendle (born May 2, 1986) is an American man who was convicted of second degree murder with a firearm and attempted second degree murder for a 2012 shooting that killed Kijuan Byrd and left Michael Smathers paralyzed. He was sentenced to the maximum penalty of life in prison without the possibility of parole, plus another consecutive 30 years in prison for the attempted murder charge.

== Background ==
Kendle was working as an armed security guard at a Miami strip club at the time of the shooting. Kendle saw Kijuan Byrd and Michael Smathers sitting in a pickup in the parking lot of the club. He later told police he thought the victims were "rolling marijuana" in the parking lot, and one of the men had threatened his life, and when the car doors swung open, he acted in self defense. Kendle fired eight times at Byrd, with at least four of the shots being fired at Byrd's back as he crawled under the truck. Byrd was killed and Smathers was paralyzed. Smathers has denied any threats being made: "we see the security, he sees us, and there were no words even exchanged," Smathers said. "The only thing I remember was opening my car door, and him telling me to put my hands up. After that, I was shot."

Kendle was 29 years old when he was convicted of murdering Byrd and attempting to murder Smathers.

== Trial ==
Kendle decided to represent himself at trial. During the trial, Kendle's former attorney Carlos Pelayo Gonzalez said; "we have physical evidence and testimonial evidence has been given pre-trial that there was another gun involved, but Mr. Kendle, because he's representing himself, doesn't know how to get that evidence to the trial".

Kendle told jurors: "the reason the evidence was fabricated is because I'm white". Despite a warning from the judge he added: "The subjects I shot were African American. I can prove that [...] What they're not allowing me to tell you is that I was arrested because of the George Zimmerman shooting."

Kendle was sentenced to life imprisonment for the second-degree murder of Byrd, and thirty years in prison for the attempted second-degree murder of Smathers.

== Controversy ==
CNN and the Center for Investigative Reporting conducted a year long investigation into the licensing of armed security guards. They reported that there are no federal training standards for armed guards and that no national database exists to keep track of abuses. One of the cases they focused on was Kendle's. CNN reported that Kendle's prior convictions for DUI and public drunkenness had not disqualified him from getting an armed guard license in Florida. Additionally, he had not disclosed that he was discharged from the Navy after several alcohol-related offenses.

Kendle's employer was Force Protection Security. An attorney speaking on behalf of the company's owner said Kendle had the necessary training and passed the required background checks for the position. A prison psychiatrist who examined Kendle after the shooting diagnosed him with impulse control disorder and anti-social personality disorder. A second court-appointed psychiatrist determined that there is a "substantial likelihood" he is "suffering from a mental illness." Additional diagnosis by court-appointed psychiatrists included "unspecified schizophrenia spectrum" and "other psychotic disorder."

Kendle claimed his case fell under the same stand your ground defense that was criticized after George Zimmerman was acquitted in the 2012 killing of Trayvon Martin.
