= James Bandinel (priest) =

James Bandinel (19 May 1814 – 1892) was a British clergyman, author and poet.

He was born on 19 May 1814, only son of James Bandinel of the Foreign Office and his wife, Marian Eliza, née Hunter.

== Career Synopsis ==
Years	Post	Location
1842–1843	Curate	Leith, Midlothian, Scotland
1843–1844	Curate	Woolpit, Suffolk
1844–1845	Curate	Belstead, Suffolk
1847–1856	Curate	Marshwood, Dorset
1849–1851	Curate	Didcot, Oxfordshire
1851–1853	Chaplain	St Michael's School, Hove, Sussex
1854–1856	Curate	Cholesbury, Buckinghamshire
1856–1862	Perpetual Curate	Cogges, Oxfordshire
1862–1881	Rector	Emley, Yorkshire

== Publications ==
Bandinel's literary work met mixed criticism in the press. The Athenaeum Journal speaks of "the harpings of the Rev. James Bandinel" and the Literary Churchman describes his "long and laboured discourse", while the Church of England Quarterly Review notes that his poem entitled "Lufra" was "highly interesting" and its treatment "exceedingly artistic".

Date	Title	Publisher
1850–1851	The Rose Queen	(Ainsworth's Magazine)
1851	Idolatrous Apostasy, a sermon	Oxford: J H Parker
1851	Lufra; or, The convent of Algarve, a poem	London: F & J Rivington
1852	Milton Davenant, a tale	London: Simpkin, Marshall & Co.
1853	Sermons devotional and practical preached to country congregations	Brighton: H S King
1858	"Remember!" The Teaching of the English Church in the matter of the Sabbath declared and vindicated, a sermon	Oxford & London: J H & J Parker
1860	Gnomon of the New Testament (transl., 3rd ed.)	(Edinburgh: T & T Clark)
1862	The star of Lovell, a tale	London: Saunders, Otley & Co.
1868	Organic reform of Convocation, an essay (3rd ed.)	Dewsbury: J Ward
1872	Report of proceedings at a meeting of churchmen in favour of a reform of Convocation (Editor)	Oxford & London
1877	The Lay House: A paper prepared for the... Association for the Reform of Convocation	London: Bemrose & Sons
1888	Our Anglican position & what it involves	London & Oxford: Parker & Co.

== Family ==
Bandinel married, on 28 January 1845, his first cousin, Julia, daughter of Rev. Thomas Le Mesurier. Their children were:

James Julius Frederick Bandinel (1845–1912)
Thomas Ranulph Bandinel (1847–1848)
Richard Bulkeley Bandinel (1849–1912)
David Guido Bandinel (1851-1851)
Robert Alexander Bandinel (1852–1853)
Margaret Anne Bandinel (1856–1859)
Julia Marian Bandinel (1859–1950)

He died 31 December 1892 in Exmouth aged 78.
