= James Bandinel (scholar) =

British scholar and cleric

James Bandinel (1733 – 17 November 1804) was a British scholar and cleric.

== Life ==
He was born in the parish of St Martin, on the Channel Island of Jersey, second son of George Bandinel by his second wife, Elizabeth Lempriere. Educated at Winchester College, Bandinel went on to achieve distinction at the University of Oxford, entering Jesus College, Oxford in 1752 (B.A. 1755, M.A. 1758, B.D. 1767 and D.D. 1777); he was Fellow 1754-1776. At University level, he was Junior Proctor in 1766 under Nathaniel Haines of Pembroke College; elected to White's Professorship of Moral Philosophy in February 1767; and elected Oxford's twenty-first Public Orator in May 1776, a position he held until 1784.

He was sometime Chaplain to the Marquess of Buckingham, the Viceroy of Ireland, and his nomination to a bishopric had been proposed by his close friend, Viscount Bulkeley of Cashel, with whom he travelled in his youth. He was Rector of St Bartholomew’s, Furtho, Northamptonshire, and also of St Giles’, Wigginton, Oxfordshire, 1775-1789.

In 1789, Bandinel was presented by his kinsman, Rev. Dr. Daniel Dumaresq, to the vicarage of Netherbury in Dorset. He sold off his possessions in an auction from his home in New College Lane, Oxford, and moved with his young family to Dorset. He is described as "a man of deep learning, sincere piety, refined manners, and great kindness of heart." Bandinel’s memory was long cherished at Netherbury, with a respect and devotion which had not died in fifty years after his death.

== Works ==
Bandinel was selected to be the first Bampton Lecturer, a post instituted by John Bampton. His series of sermons were published the next year and demonstrate "great erudition and knowledge of the Holy Scriptures"; the sermons, were, however, of a noticeably High Church strain, and his known attachment to the house of Stuart alone prevented him from attaining the highest ecclesiastical dignity.

== Family ==
Bandinel married in December 1775 to Margaret Dumaresq, and had five children, of whom Mary Anne, born 1784, died at the age of fourteen. His firstborn son, Bulkeley Bandinel, was Bodley's Librarian at Oxford from 1813-1860. His second son, James Bandinel of the Foreign Office was Superintendent of the Slave Trade Department there. Bandinel died at Winchester and was buried in the chancel at St Mary the Virgin’s, Netherbury. His wife pre-deceased him in 1792.
