= Tincleton =

Village and civil parish in Dorset, England

Coordinates: 50.7269°N 2.3252°W

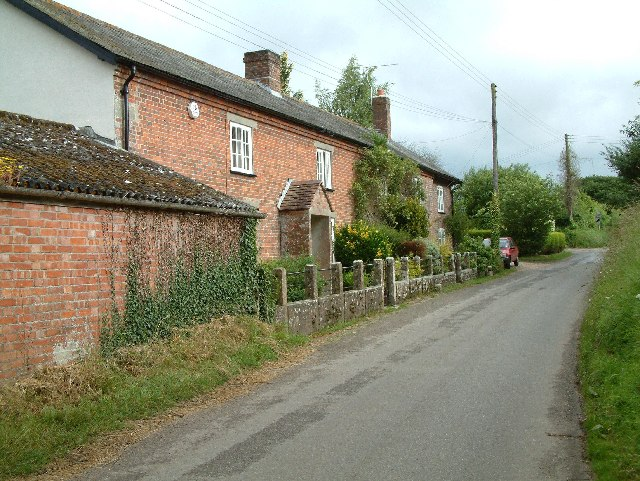
- Tincleton

- Location within Dorset
- Population: 150
- OS grid reference: SY770920
- Unitary authority: Dorset
- Ceremonial county: Dorset
- Region: South West
- Country: England
- Sovereign state: United Kingdom
- Post town: Dorchester
- Postcode district: DT2
- Police: Dorset
- Fire: Dorset and Wiltshire
- Ambulance: South Western
- UK Parliament: South Dorset

Tincleton is a village and civil parish in the county of Dorset in southern England. It is situated near the River Frome, approximately 5 miles (8.0 km) east of the county town Dorchester. The name of the village comes from the Old English "Tin la Ton", or "farm in a valley". In 2001 Tincleton had a population of 142. Dorset County Council's latest (2013) estimate of the parish population is 150.

The parish manor house, Clyffe House, was rebuilt in the Tudor style in 1842 by Benjamin Ferrey. In 1849 the parish church, which is dedicated to St John the Evangelist, was also built by Ferrey, in a 13th-century style. It replaced an earlier church to the south which was demolished when Ferrey's building was finished. Ferrey also designed a school, which was also built in the 1840s. This is now called The Old School House and contains Tincleton Gallery, which has information about the historical setting and the schoolchildren, with photos dating back to 1913.

The artist Simon Gudgeon operates a sculpture park, "Sculpture by the Lakes", nearby.

== Politics ==
After 2019 structural changes to local government in England, Tincleton is part of the Winterborne and Broadmayne ward which elects 1 member to Dorset Council.
