= Inkhorn term =

Loan or constructed word deemed unnecessary or pretentious

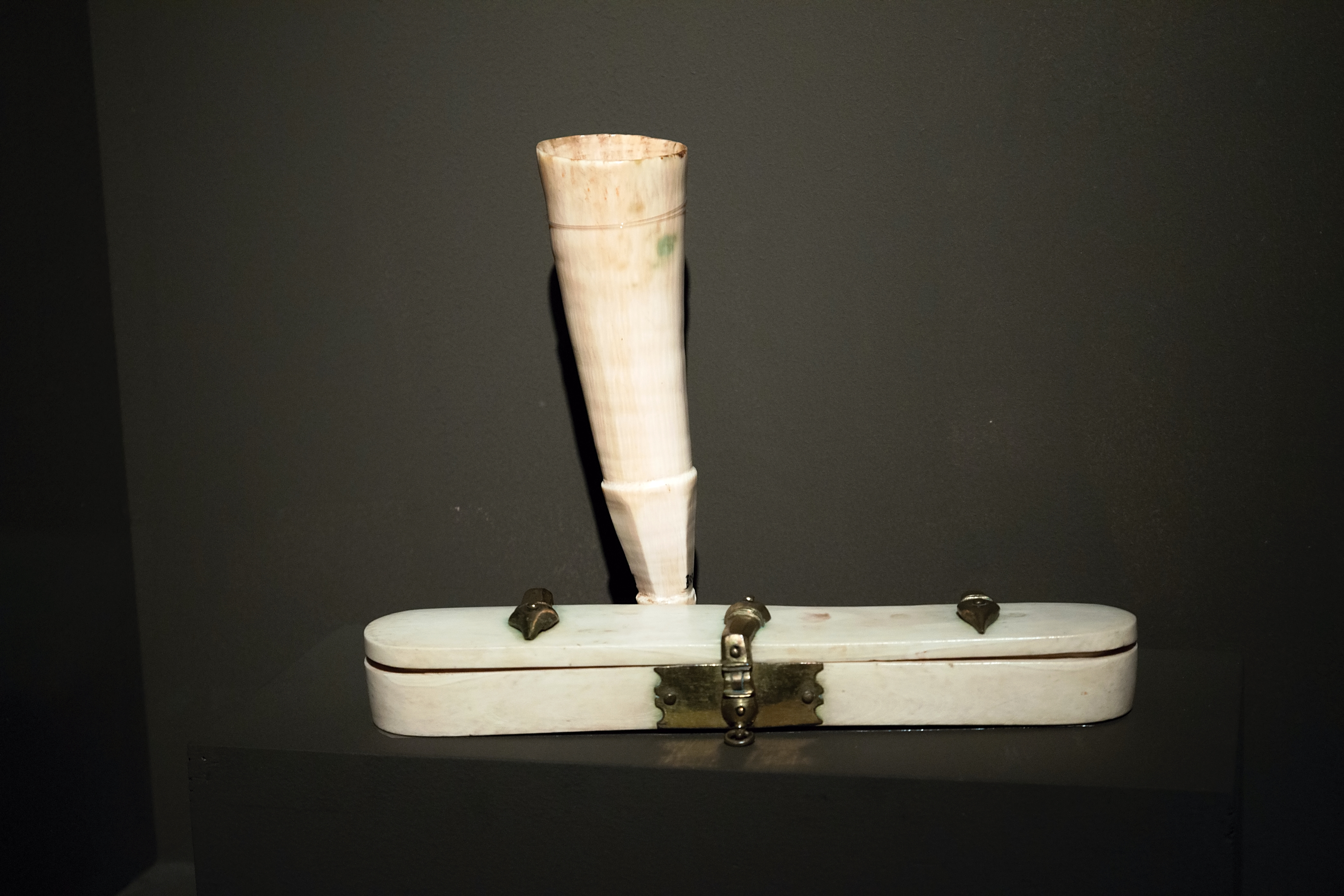
Inkhorn with ivory case (Prague, 9th–13th century)

An inkhorn term is a loanword, or a word coined from existing roots, which is deemed to be unnecessary or pretentious. The inkhorn controversy was a debate among writers in England from the mid-16th to the mid-17th century between adopters of the inkhorn terms and their opponents.

== Etymology ==
An inkhorn is an inkwell made of animal (mostly cattle) horn, made to be compatible with quill pens. It was an important tool for scholars, and became symbolic of writers in general. Subsequently, it became a metonym for fussy or pedantic writers. The phrase "inkhorn term" is found as early as 1543, and the phrase "ink pot term" was used synonymously.

In 1591, Shakespeare wrote:

And ere that we will suffer such a prince,
So kind a father of the commonweal,
To be disgracèd by an inkhorn mate

— Henry VI, Part 1, William Shakespeare

The word "inkhornism", referring to "hard words" that had newly entered the language and were difficult to understand, first appears in 1597.

== Background ==
Though English had long borrowed vocabulary from other languages, the controversy over inkhorn terms was rife from the mid-16th to the mid-17th century, during the English Renaissance and the Scientific Revolution over large numbers of new words from classical languages, namely Latin and Greek.

English was competing with Latin as the main language of science and learning in England, having just displaced French. English professor Richard Foster Jones notes that, by the 16th century, English was considered "inadequate for eloquence but adequate for the expression of ideas", but asserts that both parts of this assumption were false. In regard to the latter, advances in medicine, the natural sciences, mathematics and philosophy necessitated new words for new concepts, and some of the borrowings of the time thus filled a technical or scientific semantic gap. Others, however, duplicated existing Germanic words, often overtaking them.

== Examples ==
Some examples of inkhorn terms still in use in modern English are absurdity, capacity, celebrate, commit, dismiss, encyclopedia, habitual and lunar. Others include meditate, pathetic, phenomenon, reciprocal, scheme and strenuous.

Many inkhorn borrowings are much longer than their Germanic counterparts, e.g. conflagration for "fire".

== Controversy ==
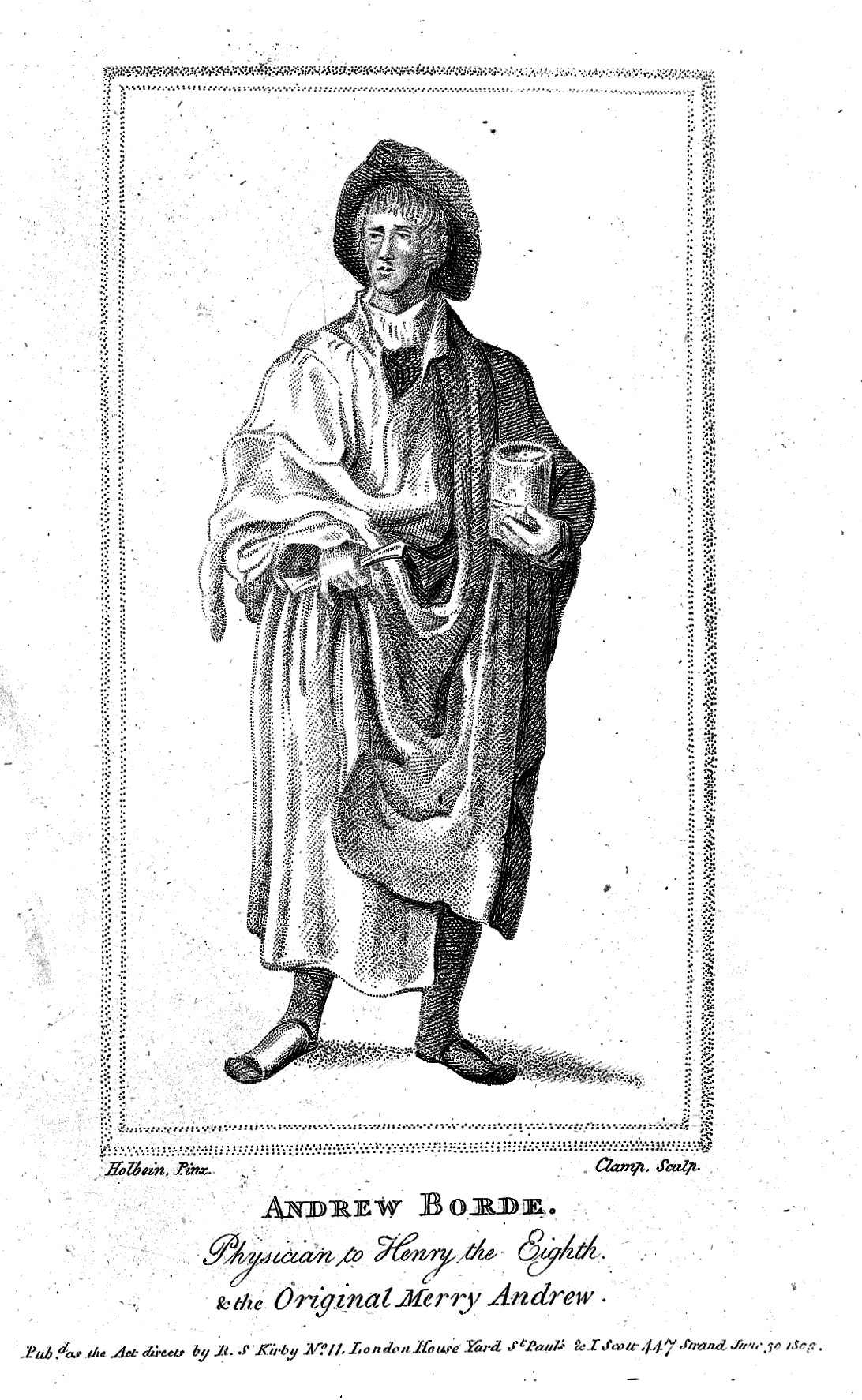
Andrew Borde, a neologizer who embraced inkhorn terms as seen in one of his books, A Compendyous Regyment or a Dyetary of Helth (1542)

Many words borrowed from the mid-16th to the mid-17th century (often self-consciously) from classical literature were deemed useless by critics who argued that the understanding of these redundant borrowings depends on knowledge of classical languages.

Writers such as Thomas Elyot and George Pettie were enthusiastic borrowers, whereas Thomas Wilson and John Cheke opposed borrowing.

I am of this opinioun that our own tung should be written cleane and pure, unmixt and unmangeled with borowing of other tunges; wherein if we take not heed by tiim, ever borowing and never paieng, she shall be fain to keepe her house as bankrupt.

— Sir John Cheke, Castiglione's Courtier, Baldassare Castiglione's Book

Poet George Gascoigne admonished in 1575 that the more English monosyllabic words a writer used, "the less you shall smell of the Inkhorne". Edward Phillips cautioned against using polysyllabic borrowings such as flexiloquent, honorificabilitudinitatibus, libanomancy, opisthographical, quinquipunctual and vulpinarity. Others went further, reviving Anglo-Saxon words or appropriating English dialect words. Cheke, for example, used "crossed" for crucified and "gainrising" for resurrection.

== Legacy ==
Many of the so-called inkhorn terms, such as dismiss, celebrate, encyclopedia, commit, capacity and ingenious, stayed in the language. Over a third of these neologisms faded soon after they were first used; for example, expede is now obsolete, although the synonym expedite and the similar word impede survive.

In many cases, pre-inkhorn words have survived alongside inkhorn borrowings to create lexical doublets and even triplets such as ask / question / interrogate, fast / firm / secure, holy / sacred / consecrated and kingly / royal / regal.

Few of the words coined in opposition to inkhorn terms remained in common usage, and the writers who rejected or disdained the use of Latinate words often could not avoid using other loanwords. Although the inkhorn controversy was over by the end of the 17th century, some later writers sought to return to what they saw as the purer roots of the language.

In the 19th century, William Barnes coined words, such as starlore for astronomy and speechcraft for grammar, but they were not widely accepted. Charles Dickens tried to either resurrect English words, e.g. gleeman for musician (see glee), sicker for certainly, inwit for conscience, yblent for confused; or coin brand-new words from English's Germanic roots (endsay for conclusion, yeartide for anniversary, foresayer for prophet).

In the 20th century, Winston Churchill famously and publicly announced his affection towards native Germanic words:

"My method is simple. I like to use Anglo-Saxon words with the least number of syllables."

— "Churchill's Anglo-Saxon words", The Lyons Den. The New York Post.

George Orwell famously analyzed and criticized the socio-political effects of the use of such words:

Bad writers, and especially scientific, political, and sociological writers, are nearly always haunted by the notion that Latin or Greek words are grander than Saxon ones, and unnecessary words like expedite, ameliorate, predict, extraneous, deracinated, clandestine, subaqueous, and hundreds of others constantly gain ground from their Anglo-Saxon opposite numbers.

— George Orwell, Politics and the English Language

== See also ==
- Aureation
- Calque
- Classical compound
- Linguistic purism and Linguistic purism in English
- Plain language
- Prestige (sociolinguistics)
- Semantic narrowing
- Thomas Elyot
- Thomas Wilson
- Uncleftish Beholding
