= Neoclassical compound =

Compound words composed from Latin or ancient Greek

Neoclassical compounds or classical compounds are compound words composed from combining forms (which act as affixes or stems) derived from the classical languages, Latin and Ancient Greek. Neo-Latin comprises many such words and is a substantial component of the technical and scientific lexicon of English and other languages, via international scientific vocabulary (ISV). For example, photography was coined in the 1830s from Greek photo- 'light' combined with -graphy 'writing'.

== Source of international technical vocabulary ==
Neoclassical compounds represent a significant source of Neo-Latin vocabulary. Since these words are composed from classical languages which are prestigious across Western European culture, they are often shared by many languages. This makes technical writing more accessible to readers who may only have a basic understanding of the language it is written in.

Not all European languages are equally receptive to neoclassical compounds. German and Russian, for instance, often create their own technical vocabularies from native elements. Usually, these creations are German and Russian calques on the international vocabulary, such as Wasserstoff and "водород" (vodoród) for hydrogen. Like any exercise in language prescription, this endeavour has been only partially successful, so while official German may still speak of a Fernsprecher, public telephones will be labelled with the internationally recognized Telefon.

== Formation, spelling, and pronunciation ==
These words are compounds formed from Latin and Ancient Greek root words. Ancient Greek words are almost invariably romanized (see transliteration of Ancient Greek into English):

- αι becomes e or æ/ae;
- γ plus a velar stop consonant such as γγ, γκ or γξ become ng, nc/nk, and nx;
- ει often becomes i (occasionally ei);
- θ becomes th;
- κ becomes c or k;
- οι becomes e or sometimes œ/oe in British English;
- ου usually becomes u, or occasionally ou;
- ῥ (rho with spiritus asper) becomes rh;
- υ becomes y;
- φ becomes ph or rarely f;
- χ becomes ch;
- ψ becomes ps;
- ω becomes o;
- rough breathing becomes h-.

Thus, for example, Ancient Greek σφιγξ becomes English (and Latin) sphinx. Exceptions to these romanizing rules occur, such as leukemia (leukaemia); compare leukocyte, also leucocyte.

Ancient Greek words often contain consonant clusters which violate the phonotactics of English and other languages: diphthong; pneumatology, phthisis. In the past, some of these were treated as silent and not pronounced, more modern speakers may to pronounce them. This adds to the irregularities of English spelling.

Neoclassical compounds frequently vary their stressed syllable when suffixes are added: ágriculture, agricúltural. Many classical compounds form derivative words: e.g. astrology, astrological, astrologe, astrologist, astrologian, astrologism.

Mainstream medical and scientific pronunciation is not the same as Classical Latin. For example, the Classical Latin pronunciation of venae cavae would be approximately /ˈwɛnaɪˈkɑːwaɪ/, the standard English medical pronunciation is /ˈviːniːˈkeɪviː/.

letter or digraph	Restored Pronunciation in English of Latin (default)	Medical/ISV pronunciation in English (default)	Example term
a	/ɑː/	/eɪ/	ramus (/ˈreɪməs/)
ae	/aɪ/	/iː/	hyphae (/ˈhaɪfi/)
e	/eɪ/	/iː/	mesial (/ˈmiːsiəl/)
i	/iː/	/aɪ/	sinus (/ˈsaɪnəs/)

== History and reception ==
English began incorporating many of these words in the sixteenth century; geography first appeared in an English text in 1535. Other early adopted words that still survive include mystagogue, from the 1540s, and androgyne, from the 1550s. The use of these technical terms predates the scientific method; the several varieties of divination all take their names from neoclassical compounds, such as alectryomancy, divination by the pecking of chickens.

Not all English writers have been friendly to the inflow of classical vocabulary. The Tudor period writer Sir John Cheke wrote:

I am of this opinion that our own tung should be written cleane and pure, unmixt and unmangeled with borrowing of other tunges; wherein if we take not heed by tiim, ever borowing and never paying, she shall be fain to keep her house as bankrupt.

and therefore rejected what he called "inkhorn terms".

Similar sentiments moved the nineteenth century author William Barnes to write "pure English," in which he avoided Greco-Latin words and found Anglo-Saxon equivalents for them: for Barnes, the newly invented art of the photograph became a sun-print. Unlike this one, some of Barnes's coinages caught on, such as foreword, Barnes's replacement for the preface of a book. Later, Poul Anderson wrote a jocular piece called Uncleftish Beholding in a constructed language based on English which others have called "Ander-Saxon"; this attempted to create a pure English vocabulary for nuclear physics. For more information, see Linguistic purism in English.

== More recent developments ==
Many such words, such as thermometer, dinosaur, rhinoceros, and rhododendron, are thoroughly incorporated into the English lexicon and are the ordinary words for their referents. Some are prone to colloquial shortening; rhinoceros often becomes rhino. The binomial nomenclature of taxonomy and biology is a major source for these items of vocabulary; for many unfamiliar species that lack a common English name, the name of the genus becomes the English word for that life form.

In the metric system, prefixes that indicate multipliers are typically Greek in origin, such as kilogram, while those that indicate divisors are Latin, as in millimeter: the base roots resemble Greek words, but in truth are neologisms. These metric and other suffixes are added to native English roots as well, resulting in creations such as gigabyte. Words of mixed Latin and Greek lineage, or words that combine elements of the classical languages with English – so-called hybrid words – were formerly castigated as "barbarisms" by prescriptionist usage commentators; this disapproval has mostly abated. Indeed, in scientific nomenclature, even more exotic hybrids have appeared, such as for example the dinosaur Yangchuanosaurus. Personal names appear in some scientific names such as Fuchsia.

Neoclassical compounds are sometimes used to lend grandeur or the impression of scientific rigour to humble pursuits: the study of cosmetology will not help anyone become an astronaut. Compounds along these models are also sometimes coined for humorous effect, such as odontopodology, the science of putting your foot into your mouth. These humorous coinages sometimes take on a life of their own, such as garbology, the study of garbage.

Some neoclassical compounds form classical plurals, and are therefore irregular in English. Others do not, while some vacillate between classical and regular plurals.

== Translation ==
There are hundreds of neoclassical compounds in English and other European languages.

Most neoclassical combining forms translate readily into everyday language, especially nouns: bio- as 'life' -graphy as 'writing, description'.

Because of this, the compounds of which they are part (usually classical or learned compounds) can be more or less straightforwardly paraphrased: biography as 'writing about a life', neurology as 'the study of the nervous system'. Many classical combining forms are designed to take initial or final position: autobiography has the two initial or preposed forms auto- and bio-, and one postposed form -graphy. Although most occupy one position or the other, some can occupy both: -graph- as in graphology and monograph; -phil- as in philology and Anglophile. Occasionally, the same base is repeated in one word: logology the study of words, phobophobia the fear of fear.

=== Preposed and postposed ===
Prefixes include: aero- air, crypto- hidden, demo- people, geo- earth, odonto- tooth, ornitho- bird, thalasso- sea.

Suffixes include: -ectomy cutting out, -graphy writing, description, -kinesis motion, -logy study, -mancy divination, -onym name, -phagy eating, -phony sound, -therapy healing, -tomy cutting. They are generally listed in dictionaries without the interfixed vowel, which appears however in such casual phrases as 'ologies and isms'.

==== Shortened forms ====
Many classical affixes have been shortened and reinterpreted by rebracketing and back-formation, making them libfixes. For example, in biology, bio- means 'life', but in bio-degradable denotes 'biologically'; although hypno- basically means 'sleep' (hypnopaedia learning through sleep), it also stands for 'hypnosis' (hypnotherapy cure through hypnosis).

Some common cases: bio biography, chemo chemotherapy, hydro hydroelectricity, metro metropolitan. Some telescoped forms are shorter than the original neoclassical combining form: gynie is shorter than gyneco- and stands for both gynecology and gynecologist; anthro is shorter than anthropo- and stands for anthropology.

The rebracketing sometimes cuts across the original morphological boundaries, as in heliport and , where heli- and -copter comes from helicopter, formed from helico- 'spiral' + -pter 'flying'.

=== Variants ===
Some classical combining forms are variants of one base.

Some are also free words, such as mania in dipsomania and phobia in claustrophobia.

Some are composites of other elements, such as encephalo- brain, from en- in, -cephal- head; and -ectomy cutting out, from ec- out, -tom- cut, -y, a noun-forming suffix that means "process of".

=== Formation ===
In Greek and Latin grammar, combining bases usually require a thematic or stem-forming vowel. In biography, from Greek, the thematic is -o-; in agriculture, from Latin, it is -i-. In English morphology, this vowel can be considered as an interfix: in biology, the interfix -o-; in miniskirt, the interfix -i-. It is usually regarded as attached to the initial base (bio-, mini-) rather than the final base (-graphy, -skirt), but in forms where it is conventionally stressed, it is sometimes considered as part of the final base (-ography, -ology). If the final element begins with a vowel (for example, -archy as in monarchy), the mediating vowel has traditionally been avoided (not *monoarchy), but in recent coinages it is often kept, sometimes accompanied by a hyphen (auto-analysis, bioenergy, hydroelectricity, not *autanalysis, *bienergy, *hydrelectricity).

Its presence helps to distinguish neoclassical compounds like biography and agriculture from vernacular compounds like teapot and blackbird.

=== Origin ===
Generally, English has acquired its neoclassical compounds in three ways: through French from Latin and Greek, directly from Latin and Greek, and by coinage in English on Greek and Latin patterns. An exception is schizophrenia, which came into English through German, and is therefore pronounced 'skitso', not 'skyzo'.

== Terminological variation ==
Most dictionaries follow the Oxford English Dictionary in using combining form (comb. form) to label such classical elements. In appendices to dictionaries and grammar books, classical combining forms are often loosely referred to as roots or affixes: 'a logo …, properly speaking, is not a word at all but a prefix meaning word and short for logogram, a symbol, much as telly is short for television' (Montreal Gazette, 13 Apr. 1981). They are often referred to as affixes because some come first and some come last. But if they were affixes proper, a word like biography would have no base whatever.

While affixes are grammatical (like prepositions), classical combining forms are lexical (like nouns, adjectives, and verbs): for example, bio- translates as a noun (life), -graphy as a verbal noun (writing). This is why some reference works also call them stems. They are also often loosely called roots because they are ancient and have a basic role in word formation, but functionally and often structurally they are distinct from roots proper: the -graph in autograph is both a root and a classical combining form, while the -graphy in cryptography consists of root -graph- and suffix -y, and is only a classical combining form.

== Philology ==
=== Conservative philological tradition ===
From the Renaissance until the mid-20th century, the concept of derivational purity has often regulated the use of classical compounds, with a philological goal of like with like (Greek with Greek, Latin with Latin) and a minimum of hybridization. For example, biography is Greek, agriculture Latin; but this ideal has seen only limited realization in practice, as for example the word television is a hybrid of Greek tele- and Latin -vision (probably so coined because the 'pure' form telescope had already been adopted for another purpose).

=== Contemporary developments ===
Generally, classical compounds were a closed system from the 16th century to the earlier 20th century: the people who used them were classically educated, their teachers and exemplars generally took a purist's view on their use, contexts of use were mainly technical, and there was relatively little seepage into the language at large. However, with the decline of classical education and the spread of technical and quasitechnical jargon in the media, a continuum has evolved, with at least five stages:

==== Pure classical usage ====
In the older sciences, classical combining forms are generally used to form such strictly classical and usually Greek compounds as anthocyanin, astrobleme, chemotherapy, chronobiology, cytokinesis, glossolalia, lalophobia, narcolepsy, osteoporosis, Pliohippus, sympathomimetic.

==== Hybrid classical usage ====
In technical, semitechnical, and quasitechnical usage at large, coiners of compounds increasingly treat Latin and Greek as one resource to produce such forms as accelerometer, aero-generator, bioprospector, communicology, electroconductive, futurology, mammography, micro-gravity, neoliberal, Scientology, servomechanism.

==== Hybrid classical/vernacular usage ====
In the later 20th century, many forms have cut loose from ancient moorings: crypto- as in preposed Crypto-Fascist and pseudo- as in pseudoradical; postposed -meter in speedometer, clapometer. Processes of analogy have created coinages like petrodollar, psycho-warfare, microwave on such models as petrochemical, psychology, microscope. Such stunt usages as eco-doom, eco-fears, eco-freaks, common in journalism, often employ classical combining forms telescopically: eco- standing for ecology and ecological and not as used in economics. In such matters, precision of meaning is secondary to compactness and vividness of expression.

==== Combining forms as separate words ====
In recent years, the orthography of many word forms has changed, usually without affecting pronunciation and stress. The same spoken usage may be written micro-missile, micro missile, micromissile, reflecting the same uncertainty or flexibility as in businessman, business-man, business man. When used in such ways, classical compounds are often telescopic: Hydro substation Hydro-Electricity Board substation, Metro highways Metropolitan highways, porno cult pornography cult.

==== New classical compounds ====
The mix of late 20th century techno-commercial coinages includes three groups of post- and non-classical forms:

1. Established forms: econo- from 'economic', as in econometric, Econo-Car; mini- from 'miniature', as in miniskirt, mini-boom; -matic from 'automatic', as in Adjustamatic, Instamatic, Stackomatic.
2. Less established forms, often created by blending: accu- from 'accurate', as in Accuvision; compu- from 'computer', as in Compucorp; docu- from 'documentary', as in docudrama; perma- from 'permanent', as in permafrost and permaban; dura- from 'durable', as in Duramark.
3. Informal vernacular material in pseudo-classical form: Easibird, Healthitone, Redi-pak, Relax-A-Cizor (relax, exerciser).

== Similar systems ==
In East Asia, a similar role to Latin and Greek has been played by Chinese, with non-Chinese languages both borrowing a significant number of words from Chinese and using morphemes borrowed from Chinese to coin new words, particularly in formal or technical language. See Sino-Japanese vocabulary and Sino-Korean vocabulary for discussion.

The coinage of new native terms on Chinese roots is most notable in Japanese, where it is referred to as wasei kango (和製漢語; Japanese-made Chinese words). Many of these have been subsequently borrowed into Chinese and Korean with the same (or corresponding) characters being pronounced differently according to language. For example, 自動車 (Japanese jidōsha, Korean jadongcha, Mandarin zìdòngchē) is a Japanese-coined word meaning "automobile", literally self-move-car; compare to auto (self) + mobile (moving).

== See also ==
Topics

- English words of Greek origin
- Hybrid word
- Interlingua
- International scientific vocabulary
- Internationalism (linguistics)
- -ism
- Latin influence in English
- -ology
- Sino-xenic vocabularies, for similar constructs in Korean, Japanese, Vietnamese, etc.

Lists

- List of Germanic and Latinate equivalents in English
- List of Greek and Latin roots in English
- List of Latin and Greek words commonly used in systematic names
- List of Latin words with English derivatives

== Bibliography ==
- McArthur, Tom (ed.), The Oxford Companion to the English Language (Oxford University Press, 1992). ISBN 0-19-214183-X
- Plag, Ingo, Word-Formation in English (Cambridge University Press, 2003), ISBN 978-0-521-52563-3 (review at doi:10.4000/lexis.4532)
- Melloni, Chiara, "Neoclassical Word Formation" in Ackema, Peter; Bendjaballah, Sabrina; Bonet i Alsina, M. Eulàlia; Fábregas, Antonio, eds. (Wiley, 2023). The Wiley Blackwell companion to morphology. ISBN 978-1-119-69360-4
