= Aureation =

Rhetorical device

Aureation ("to make golden", from Latin: aureus) is a device in arts of rhetoric that involves the "gilding" (or supposed heightening) of diction in one language by the introduction of terms from another, typically a classical language considered to be more prestigious. Aureation commonly involves other mannered rhetorical features in diction, such as circumlocution, which bears a relation to more native literary devices such as the kenning. It can be seen as analogous to Gothic schools of ornamentation in carving, painting, or ceremonial armoury.

In terms of prosody, it stands in direct contrast to plain language, and its use is sometimes regarded as overblown and exaggerated by current standards of literary taste. However, aureated expression does not necessarily mean loss of precision or authenticity in poetry, especially when handled by good practitioners.

== Loanwords and neologisms ==
In the context of language development, aureation can be seen as an extension of processes in which historically vernacular languages are expanded through loan words. In Europe, this usually meant borrowings from Latin and Greek. The medieval and Renaissance periods were a fertile time for such borrowings, and in Germanic languages, such as English and Scots, Greek and Latinate coinages were particularly highlighted (see classical compounds), though this has sometimes been decried as pretentious. While many classically derived loan words become useful new terms in the host language, some more mannered or polysyllabic aureations may tend to remain experimental and decorative curiosities. Words such as conservartix, pawsacioun, or vinarye envermaildy are Scots examples.

In the British Isles, aureation has often been most associated with Scottish renaissance makars, especially William Dunbar or Gavin Douglas, who commonly drew on the rhetoric and diction of classical antiquity in their work. After Europe's colonial era widened the orbits of cultural contact, aureation could, in theory, draw on other ancient languages such as Sanskrit.

== Example ==
An example of considered diction with an aureate inflection occurs in the Scots couplet

Up sprang the goldyn candill matutyne,
With clere depurit bemes cristallyne

— William Dunbar, The Goldyn Targe, lines 4–5

Matutyne, depurit and cristallyne are aureate words. Aureate diction occurs in the noun phrase golden candle matutine, a circumlocution which stands for sun. The couplet can thus be translated as: up rose the sun with clear pure crystal light.

Dunbar himself uses the term later in the same poem in a passage that employs the limits to expression topos. It occurs as part of a dream vision in which the makar is describing the army of goddesses he has witnessed alighting upon the earth:

Discrive I wald, but quho coud wele endyte
Hou all the feldís wyth thai lilies quhite
Depaynt war bricht, quhilk to the heven did glete?
Noucht thou, Omer, als fair as thou could wryte,
For all thine ornate stilís so perfyte;
Nor yit thou Tullius, quhois lippís suete
Off rhetorike did in to termés flete:
Your aureate tongís both bene all to lyte
For to compile that paradise complete.

— The Goldyn Targe, lines 64–72

In modern English, this translates to, "I would [attempt to] describe [the scene], but who could satisfactorily frame in verse the way in which all the fields were radiantly adorned by those white lilies (the landing army) that shone upwards into the sky? Not you, Homer, sublime as you were in writing, for all your faultlessly ornate diction; nor you, Cicero, whose sweet lips were so consistently lucid in rhetoric: your aureate tongues both [the Greek and the Roman] were not adequate to describe that vision in full."

== See also ==
- Diglossia
- Euphuism
- Inkhorn term
- Inventio
- Literary language
- Neologism
