= Linguistic purism =

Preferring a language variety as purer

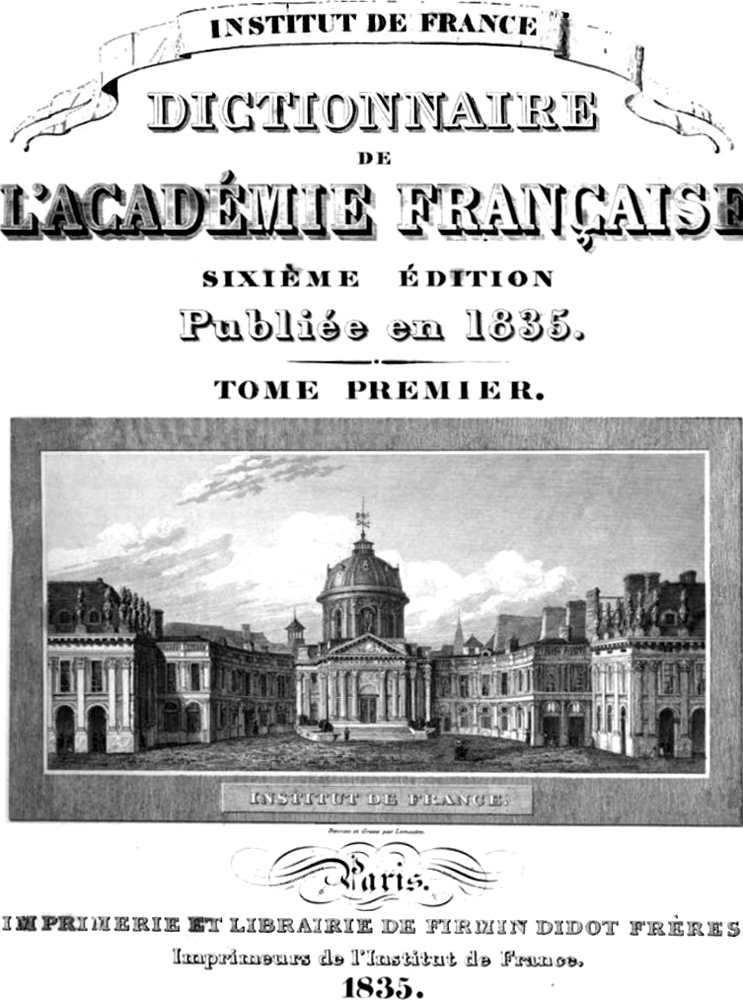
The Académie Française in France is charged with maintaining the linguistic purism of the French language. This is the first page of the 6th edition of their dictionary (1835).

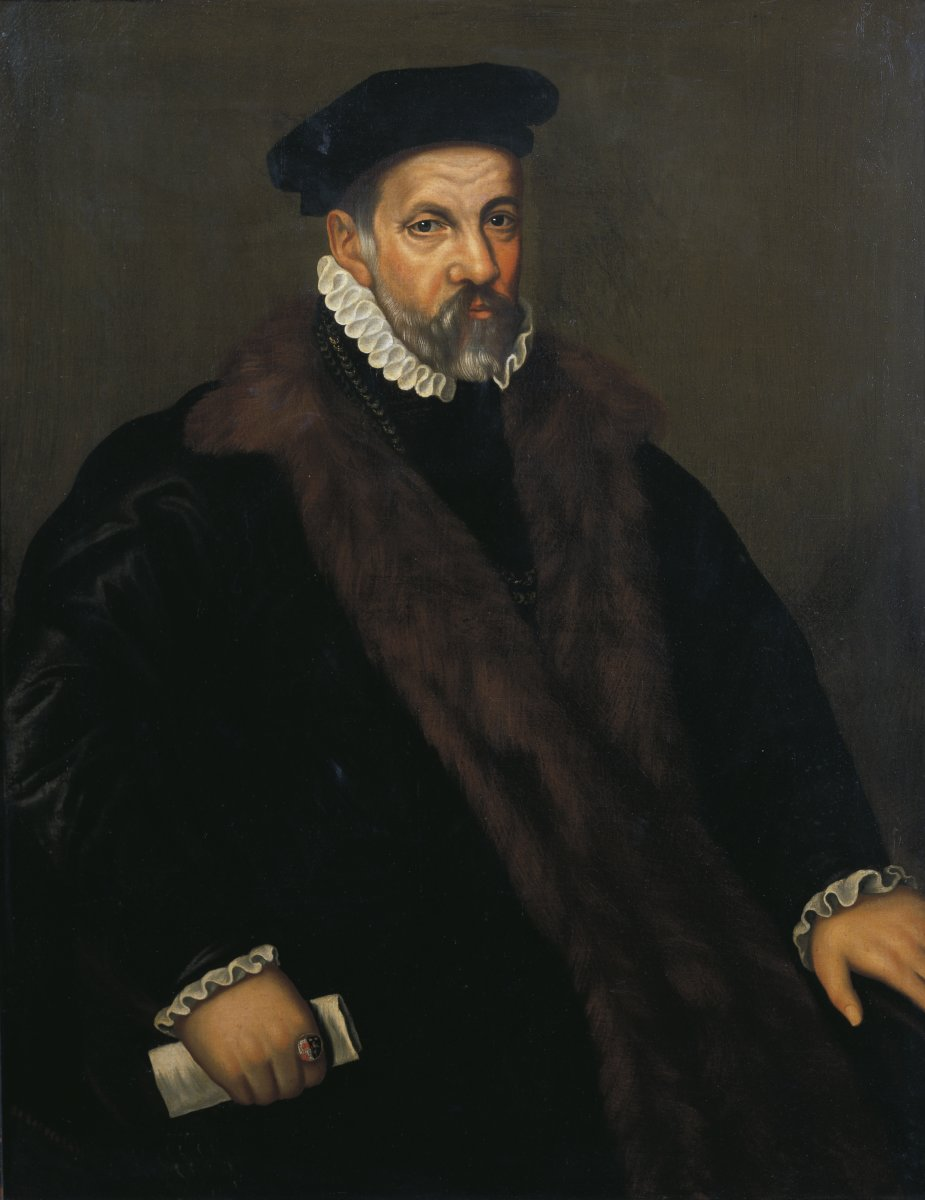
Thomas Wilson, a 16th-century linguistic purist who mocked inkhorn terms with his book, The Arte Of Rhetorique (1553)

Linguistic purism or linguistic protectionism is a concept with two common meanings: one with respect to foreign languages and the other with respect to the internal variants of a language (dialects). The first meaning is the historical trend of the users of a language desiring to conserve intact the language's lexical structure of word families, in opposition to foreign influence which are considered 'impure'. The second meaning is the prescriptive practice of determining and recognizing one linguistic variety (dialect) as being purer or of intrinsically higher quality than other related varieties.

The perceived or actual decline identified by the purists may take the form of a change of vocabulary, syncretism of grammatical elements, or loanwords. The unwanted similarity is often with a neighboring language the speakers of which are culturally or politically dominant. The ideal may invoke logic, clarity, or the grammar of classic languages. It is often presented as a conservative measure, as a protection of a language from the encroachment of other languages or of the conservation of the national Volksgeist, but is often innovative in defining a new standard. It is sometimes part of governmental language policy that is enforced in various ways.

== History ==
Historically, in the first meaning, linguistic purism was institutionalized in Italy through language academies (of which the 1572 Accademia della Crusca set as a model example in Europe), and their decisions often having the force of law.

Purism in Italy until the 19th century stemmed from the doctrine, developed in the 16th century mainly by Pietro Bembo and Lionardo Salviati and supported by dictionaries and grammars, that literary usage should imitate 14th-century Florentine. This view was contested by the Enlightenment, and the terms purismo and purista (first recorded 1758–9 but not used in print until 1838) were introduced to denote linguistic affectation or archaism. The 19th-century purism of Antonio Cesari and others was based both on veneration for the 14th century and on distaste for neologisms and foreign borrowings, especially from French. Purism in the 20th century resisted unassimilated borrowings from French and later from English and was at its height during the second half of the Fascist period. The neopurismo promoted by Bruno Migliorini from the late 1930s sought a compromise between the needs of Italian to evolve and to maintain its structures.

== Cognate languages ==
In one common case, two closely related languages or language varieties are in direct competition, one weaker, the other stronger. Speakers of the stronger language may characterize the weaker language as a "dialect" of the strong language, with the implication that it has no independent existence. In response, defenders of the other language will go to great lengths to prove that their language is equally autonomous.

In this context, Yiddish and Dutch have in the past sometimes been considered dialects of German. In the case of Low German, spoken in eastern Netherlands and northern Germany, the debate is still current, as it could be considered a dialect of Dutch or German or a language of its own. An example of a related language that has only recently attained the status of an official national language is Luxembourgish. Since linguistic science offers no scholarly definition of a dialect, and linguists regard the distinction with scepticism – see A language is a dialect with an army and navy – the argument is really about subjective questions of identity politics, and at times it can invoke extreme emotions from the participants.

=== Writing systems ===
Closely related languages often tend to mix. One way of preventing this is to use different writing systems or different spelling systems.

Examples of this include:

- Moldovan and Romanian are virtually identical in all respects except that Moldovan used a Cyrillic writing system until the independence of Moldova in 1992 — though it is still in use in Transnistria — while Romanian uses a Latin writing system.
- Hindi and Urdu are distinguished by their Devanagari and Arabic-based scripts. In recent decades, the languages have drifted further apart, due to the Sanskritization of Hindi and the Arabization and Persianization of Urdu.
- The Serbian and Croatian literary standards differ mainly in using the Cyrillic and Latin scripts. They exhibit a high degree of mutual intelligibility as they are based on essentially the same dialect, a stylized form of Neoštokavian (Štokavian being the one dialect common to both Serbian and Croatian).
- Yiddish is a West Germanic language written in the Hebrew script. Standard High German is closely related, but written in the Latin alphabet.

== Forms ==
Various scholars have devised classifications of purism. These classifications take different criteria as their starting point and are therefore partly independent of each other.

=== Based on the approach ===
One taxonomy of puristic orientations is due to George Thomas:

- Archaizing purism: This happens when a speech-community tries to revive the language of a perceived or actual golden age of literature. Examples: Arabic, Tanittamil Iyakkam in Tamil, Icelandic (see also: Linguistic purism in Icelandic), Ancient Greek (Atticism), Katharevousa in Modern Greek, Sanskrit, Latin (puristic obsession with classical forms among speakers of Romance languages and those influenced by them during the Renaissance). See also Language revival.
- Ethnographic purism: This form is based on an idealization of the countryside, folk stories and dialects. Examples: Nynorsk (New Norwegian), some versions of Demotic Greek.
- Elitist purism: Associated with a highly formal variety linked to an elite, for example the language spoken at the court.
- Reformist purism: The main feature here is to break the bonds with the past. An example of this is the removal of Persian and Arabic words during Turkish language reform under Atatürk in order to break with the Ottoman Turkish language influenced by Arabic and Persian. Other examples are the purist efforts in languages like Hausa, Swahili and Hindi to break with the colonial past. In addition, language policies may seek to decrease similarities between mutually intelligible languages for ethno-political reasons, as has been the case with Dano-Norwegian, Hindustani (Hindi and Urdu) and Malaysian/Indonesian.
- Playful purism: Intended as a joke, e.g., Philipp von Zesen's coinage Gesichtsvorsprung lit. 'facial projection' to mean 'nose'.
- Xenophobic purism: involves the elimination or exclusion of foreign elements. Examples include High Norwegian, Korean and Anglish. Many English writers of the 19th and 20th centuries extolled the virtues of "strong" Anglo-Saxon words such as foreword over the "weak" Romance word preface. French, German, Greek and Latvian are known for their preference for coining words using native roots (often calques) over borrowing foreign words; some are more successful than others.

=== Based on the goals ===
- Democratic purism: Aims at safeguarding the intelligibility of (modern) concepts for a larger group of language users through enforcing their expression by the means of common, every-day words or expressions (for example, "back[ing] up" instead of "sustain[ment]")
- Unificatory purism: Aims at better uniting the overall user group of a language by reducing certain regional or professional linguistic peculiarities which could separate varying aspects of life, or even obstruct interconnectivity, between individuals or sub-groups of different regional provenience or professional background.
- Defensive purism: Aims at defending a language from external threats. Mostly, these are to be understood as influx of foreign ideas which a given language group (or its political system) disdains or has overthrown, or influx of foreign words or expressions which tend to substitute innate vocabulary, thus diminishing and/or endangering supra-regional or inter-generational intelligibility within a language area or between its present speakers and the literary remnants of their venerated ancestors, i. e., some kind of "classical" heritage (as e. g. Shakespeare's usage is already no more widely understood amongst many of today's English speakers).
- Prestige purism: Aims at varying prestige functions.
- Delimiting purism: Aims at establishing some kind of separating functions.

=== Based on the intensity ===
- Marginal purism: Purism never becomes at any stage a value-feature of the speech community. On the contrary, there is a certain openness to all sources of enrichment, at the same time characterized by a lack among the language elite of intellectual digestion of foreign influxes, or by a lack of such an elite as a whole. Examples: English, Russian, Polish, Japanese, Ancient Greek.
- Moderate, discontinuous purism: A moderate attitude is discernible over a long period of time. Examples: Spanish, Portuguese, French and Italian.
- Trimming purism: A reactive correction to a potentially dangerous trend in the development of a standard language. Examples: Danish, Swedish, Dutch, Slovak.
- Evolutionary purism: Purism is seen early in the development of a written language. There are no radical changes or orientation. During the standardising process, purism gains momentum after which it slows down. Examples: Hungarian, Finnish, Estonian, Hebrew, Latvian, Croatian and Slovene.
- Oscillatory purism: Involves repeated swings between intense purism and a more inclusive attitude. Examples: German, Czech and Yiddish.
- Stable, consistent purism: No interruption or fluctuation in intensity is seen. Purism is a constant value-feature of the speech community. Examples: Arabic, Tamil and Icelandic.
- Revolutionary purism: An abrupt change from the previously mentioned patterns to another. Examples: Turkish.

=== Based on linguistic level ===
- Lexical purism: directed at the lexicon, first of all against direct lexical loans, often combined with the development of loan translations (such as in Norwegian: hand out > støtteark and snowboard > snøbrett or Arabic tilifūn > hātif and kumbyūtir > ḥāsūb.
- Orthographic purism: directed against foreign orthographic elements (such as in Norwegian: genre > sjanger, in Spanish: football > fútbol). Note that there is also reverse orthographic purism. Some Spanish speakers prefer the English spelling "blue jean" and object to the spelling bluyín.
- Morphological purism: directed against foreign inflection and declension (such as the resistance to plural -s in noun endings in Scandinavian languages).
- Syntactic purism: directed at syntactic features from other languages (such as the stylistic resistance in Nynorsk against some passive constructions and some constructions with the genitive).
- Phonetic purism: directed at foreign phonemes and phonematical combinations (such as gánster or champú in Spanish). There is a reverse phonetic purism, which insists in the original pronunciation, such as pronouncing gángster and shampú in Spanish.

=== Other forms ===
- Regressive purism: The eradication of very old loan-words. It is one of the main features of ultrapurism.
- Ultrapurism: The extreme upper limit of purism. In this pattern, everything expressed by human speech can become a target for puristic intervention, even geographical names, proper names, etc. (The attitude – in itself "puristic" and associated with increased education and foreign language competency – opposed to the translation or adaptation of toponyms, or even personal names, is historically quite recent, as names are not considered fixed or unchanging in most cultures; and there are many exceptions even in English, especially the names of historical personages, Native Americans, and even contemporary royalty. Historically, names were part of the lexicon of a language just as every other word, and it was common to have different names associated with different language communities. See endonym and exonym. The longer established the tradition of a name or term, the more likely are strong differences.) Two recorded examples of this are High Icelandic (Háfrónska), and the usage of the German renaissance humanist Johann Georg Turmair who even translated the name of the ancient Roman general Fabius Cunctator into Zauderer Bohnenmaier (i. e. literally "Laggard Bean-Mayor"). While not ultra-purism per se, phono-semantic matching is commonly used in a number of languages, notably for translating proper names into Chinese.

== By language ==
- Arabic – Diwan of Arabic Language
- Bangla – Bangla language movement
- Basque – Euskara garbia
- Croatian – Croatian linguistic purism
- English – Anglish
- French – Académie Française
- Esperanto – La bona lingvo
- German – Linguistic purism in German
- Greek – Katharevousa
- Icelandic – Linguistic purism in Icelandic, Háíslenska/High Icelandic
- Italian – Accademia della Crusca, Italianization
- Hindustani – Hindi-Urdu controversy
- Korean – Linguistic purism in Korean
- Malayalam – Pacchamalayala Prasthanam
- Malay - Beka Melayu
- Meitei (officially known as Manipuri) - Meitei linguistic purism movement
- Norwegian – Høgnorsk/High Norwegian
- Russian – Lovers of the Russian Word
- Sinhala – Hela Havula
- Tamil – Tanittamil Iyakkam
- Telugu – Mēlimi Telugu
- Hebrew – Hebrew during the Haskalah, Academy of the Hebrew Language
- Turkish – Öztürkçe

== See also ==
- Inkhorn debate
- Language policy
- Language planning
- Language revitalization
- Language secessionism
- Linguistic imperialism
- Linguistic prescription
- Lexical innovation
- Phono-semantic matching
