= Linguistic purism in Icelandic =

Linguistic purism in Icelandic is the policy of discouraging new loanwords from entering the Icelandic language by instead creating new words from Old Icelandic roots or, when that is not possible, from Old Norse roots.

The effort began during the early 19th century Icelandic national movement, aiming at replacing older loanwords, especially from Danish; it continues today, targeting English words. It is widely upheld as the dominant language ideology in Iceland, being fully supported by the Icelandic government through the Árni Magnússon Institute for Icelandic Studies, the Icelandic Language Council, the Icelandic Language Fund, and the national holiday Icelandic Language Day.

== History ==
=== Early innovations ===
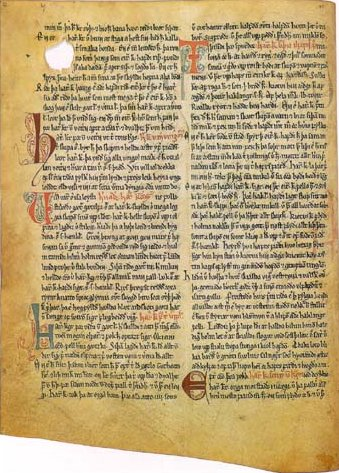
A page of Heimskringla

The first signs of the Icelanders' pre-occupation with their mother tongue date back to the mid-12th century with the First Grammatical Treatise (Fyrsta málfræðiritgerðin), which undertook to design an alphabet for the language and proposed separate (non-Latin) letters for the distinctive Icelandic phonemes. It was, in a way, an attempt to give the young Icelandic people a language of their own. Also significant was the Icelandic historiography, which started at an early date with Ari Þorgilsson's Íslendingabók and ranged through the Landnámabók (book of colonization) to Snorri Sturluson's Heimskringla. In particular, the prose of the sagas of the Icelanders and Snorri's skaldic poetry are clear signs of appreciation of the native language.

By 1300, after the Icelanders had joined in union with the Norwegian crown, Icelandic had developed several characteristics that distinguished it from the dialects of the Norwegian districts from where many had migrated to Iceland centuries earlier.

By the 16th century, the language was so differentiated from the languages spoken in Scandinavia that Icelanders coined the term íslenska to denote their native tongue. A serious effort to preserve the now quite distinct Icelandic from the "corrupting" influences of foreign words, especially by the Danish and German merchants who dominated Iceland's trade, began in the early 17th century thanks to Arngrímur Jónsson.

=== 18th and 19th centuries ===
The first real instigator of Icelandic linguistic purism (hreintungustefna) was Eggert Ólafsson (1726–68). Between 1752 and 1757, he accompanied his friend Bjarni Pálsson on an expedition through Iceland. In his report, he described the situation of the Icelandic language as lamentable. This inspired him to write the poem Sótt og dauði íslenskunnar, in which he personifies his mother tongue as a woman, who has fallen mortally ill through an infection with too many foreign words. She sends her children to look for good and pure Icelandic that can cure her, but uncontaminated language is nowhere to be found, and she dies. At the end of the poem he urges his compatriots to defend their language and reminds them of the great esteem in which Icelandic is held abroad and how well it has been preserved by their forefathers.

Eggert Ólafsson was very well-read in Old Icelandic literature, which was noticeable in his writings. This interest in the old language brought him into contact with other Icelandic students in Copenhagen, where he joined a secret society called Sakir (1720–72). This was the beginning of the use of Old Icelandic as a key feature in the Icelandic national awakening. Eggert wrote the first orthographical dictionary (Réttritabók Eggerts Ólafssonar) in which he proposed orthographic and phonetic rules. The influence of the book was considerable, and Ólafur Olavius, originator of the Hrappseyjarprentsmiðja, the first privately owned printing shop in Iceland, followed Eggert's rules to a significant extent.

Eleven years after Eggert's death, the Íslenska lærdómslistafélag (Icelandic Art-Learning Society) was founded in Copenhagen with Jón Eiríksson, administrative director at the Danish Ministry of Finance, as its president. The society published annual writings from 1781 to 1796, which dealt with practical subjects like trade and business, but also with varied scientific topics about which little had been read until then. This brought along a flood of new Icelandic terminology, generated from purely Icelandic lexical stock.

In Denmark, the rise of Romanticism sparked a greater public interest in Norse mythology. This opened the eyes of Icelanders with regard to their cultural importance and increased their self-confidence. The Danish linguist Rasmus Rask (1787–1832) learnt Icelandic in his youth and it became his favorite language. He compiled the first real Icelandic grammar, which was a huge step forward in comparison with earlier attempts. He refused to accept the differences between Old and Modern Icelandic and was afraid that a too great difference between the two would decrease the interest in the land and its culture. This attitude promoted language archaisation. On Rask's initiative the Icelandic Literary Society, Hið íslenska bókmenntafélagið, was founded. Its goal was "to preserve the Icelandic language and literature and therewith the culture and the honour of the land". An important publication was Almenn jarðarfræða og landaskipun eður geographia (1821–27), which contains much new genuine Icelandic terminology. It was an opportunity to demonstrate the validity of Rasmus Rask's vision that the Icelandic language had, more than most languages, an "endless neologistic generating capability".

During the 19th century, the linguistic purism movement is inextricably connected with the magazine Fjölnir (published from 1835 to 1839 and from 1844 to 1847). The magazine was published in Copenhagen by four young Icelanders: Konráð Gíslason, Jónas Hallgrímsson, Brynjólfur Pétursson and Tómas Sæmundsson. The most important of these four was Jónas Hallgrímsson, who also translated literary work of Heine and Ossian. His translation of a textbook on astronomy (Stjörnufræði, 1842) became exemplary for later translations of scientific literature. Many of the neologisms he coined have become an integral part of present-day Icelandic terminology: aðdráttarafl (gravity), hitabelti (tropics), sjónauki (telescope), samhliða (parallel).

Konráð Gíslason (1808–91), professor in Old Scandinavian languages at the University of Copenhagen, published the first Danish–Icelandic dictionary in 1851.

=== 20th century onwards ===
The Icelandic government began to regulate the language after achieving sovereignty in 1918. The government's initial focus was on orthography, but was expanded to a broader and more formalised regulation of language matters. Early in the 20th century, the third element in Icelandic preservation, ordinary speakers, especially those in modernising sectors, also began to contribute to language preservation efforts. For instance, in 1918, the Association of Engineers (Verkfræðingafélagið) began a systematic approach to neologisms. In 1951, a Dictionary Committee of the University of Iceland (Orðabókarnefnd Háskólans) began publishing lists of new words, marking the beginning of formal government sponsorship of neologisms.

In 1965, a ministerial decree of the Ministry of Education, Science and Culture (Menntamálaráðuneytið) established the Íslensk málnefnd (Icelandic Language Committee) to "guide government agencies and the general public in matters of language on a scholarly basis". This committee consisted of three members, and even after two additional members joined in 1980, its limited resources hindered its ability to fulfill its mission. In response, the Althing, in 1984, passed legislation to ratify the five person membership and establish a permanently functioning secretariat, the Íslensk málstöð (Icelandic Language Institute). The Council was enlarged to 15 members in 1990, appointed by and from a number of sectors, similar to its counterparts elsewhere in Scandinavia.

Day-to-day operations are the province of the Institute. Occupying a suite of offices on Neshagi, a street near the University, and previously the site of the American Embassy's cultural center, the Institute today is headed by Ari Páll Kristinsson and has only four employees who give advice on language and usage matters to public authorities and the broadcasting service (Ríkisútvarpið) and answer questions from the general population. In September 2006, the Institute was merged into the Árni Magnússon Institute for Icelandic Studies.

== Purpose ==
The Icelandic language is a basic element of the national identity of the Icelanders. The main focus of linguistic purism in Icelandic is to maintain the structure of the language (for instance as a declined language compared to some other West European Indo-European languages, such as English and French), and to develop its vocabulary, so that the language can be used to speak about any topic—no matter how technical—which, in turn, contributes to keeping the language up-to-date.

== Creation of new words ==
Organisations and individuals in many specialist areas together with the Icelandic Language Institute propose and use new technical lexis, which diversifies the Icelandic lexicon as a whole. When introducing words for new or modern concepts, it is common to revitalise old words that have fallen into disuse but have a similar meaning or are in the same semantic field. For example, the word sími, an old word for "long thread", was brought back with a new meaning: "telephone". Alternatively, new compound words such as veðurfræði ("meteorology") can be formed from old words (in this case veður "weather", and fræði "science"). Thus speakers of Icelandic can easily deconstruct many words to find their etymologies; indeed compound words are very frequent in the Icelandic language. This system also makes it easier for new words to fit in with existing Icelandic grammatical rules: the gender and declension of the compound word can easily be extracted from its derivatives, as can pronunciation. In recent years, the government has promoted an interest in technology, including efforts to produce Icelandic language software and other computer interfaces.

== Loanwords ==
However intensive the linguistic purification effort, loanwords are still entering the language. Some of these loanwords have been adapted and moulded to fit in with Icelandic grammatical rules, including inflection and pronunciation. For example, the word bíll ("a car") comes from the word "automobile" via the Danish shortened version bil. Sapir and Zuckermann (2008) demonstrate how Icelandic "camouflages" many English words by means of phono-semantic matching. For example, the Icelandic-looking word eyðni, meaning "AIDS", is a phonosemantic match of the English acronym AIDS, using the existing Icelandic verb eyða ("to destroy") and the Icelandic nominal suffix -ni. Similarly, the Icelandic word tækni ("technology", "technique") derives from tæki ("tool") combined with the nominal suffix -ni, but is a phonosemantic match of the Danish (or international) teknik with the same meaning. This neologism was coined in 1912 by Dr Björn Bjarnarson from Viðfjörður in the east of Iceland. It was little used until the 1940s, but has since become highly common, as a lexeme and as an element in new formations, such as raftækni ("electronics") literally meaning "electrical technics", tæknilegur ("technical") and tæknir ("technician"). Other phonosemantic matches discussed in the article are beygla, bifra – bifrari, brokkál, dapur – dapurleiki – depurð, fjárfesta – fjárfesting, heila, ímynd (image), júgurð, korréttur, Létt og laggott, musl, pallborð – pallborðsumræður, páfagaukur (parrot), ratsjá (radar device), setur, staða, staðall – staðla – stöðlun, toga – togari, uppi and veira (virus).

An example of adaptation of a foreign word is "Ísraeli" (same meaning as in English, as a noun), which in Icelandic has the plural Ísraelar, formed analogously to native Icelandic words such as the poetic gumi ("a man") and bogi ("a bow").

== Foreign language learning ==
Linguistic purification does not imply limitations to or neglect of foreign language learning. Teaching of foreign languages in Iceland is heavily emphasized, and the learning of English and Danish (or another Scandinavian language) in school is compulsory. Danish was taught because Iceland was a dominion of Denmark until 1918 (with the same king until 1944); this study is still compulsory to maintain ties with Scandinavia. English is learned as the main international language, especially in view of the internationalization of the economy of Iceland with intensive trade and capital flows to and from the outside world. Students entering a gymnasium are also usually required to choose a third foreign language. Traditionally that was either German or French, but in recent years Spanish has also been offered in many gymnasia. Other languages are sometimes added as an option but usually as part of a language-heavy course of study at the cost of the natural sciences. Students who have lived in another Nordic country, or for whatever reason have some understanding of another Scandinavian language, can study that language instead of Danish.

== Ultrapurism ==
A minor movement started by Jozef Braekmans of Lier, Belgium, around 1992 aimed at removing loan words from the modern Icelandic language and creating new terms for all historical loan words. It was named "High Icelandic" or "Hyper-Icelandic" (Háíslenska or Háfrónska). The movement has not gained traction.

== See also ==
- Linguistic purism
- Icelandic Language Institute

== Bibliography ==
- Halldór Halldórsson (1979). "Icelandic Purism and its History". Word. 30: 76–86.
- Kristján Árnason; Sigrún Helgadóttir (1991). "Terminology and Icelandic Language Policy". Behovet och nyttan av terminologiskt arbete på 90-talet. Nordterm 5. Nordterm-symposium. pp. 7–21.
