= William Barnes =

English writer, clergyman and philologist (1801–1886)

The Reverend William Barnes
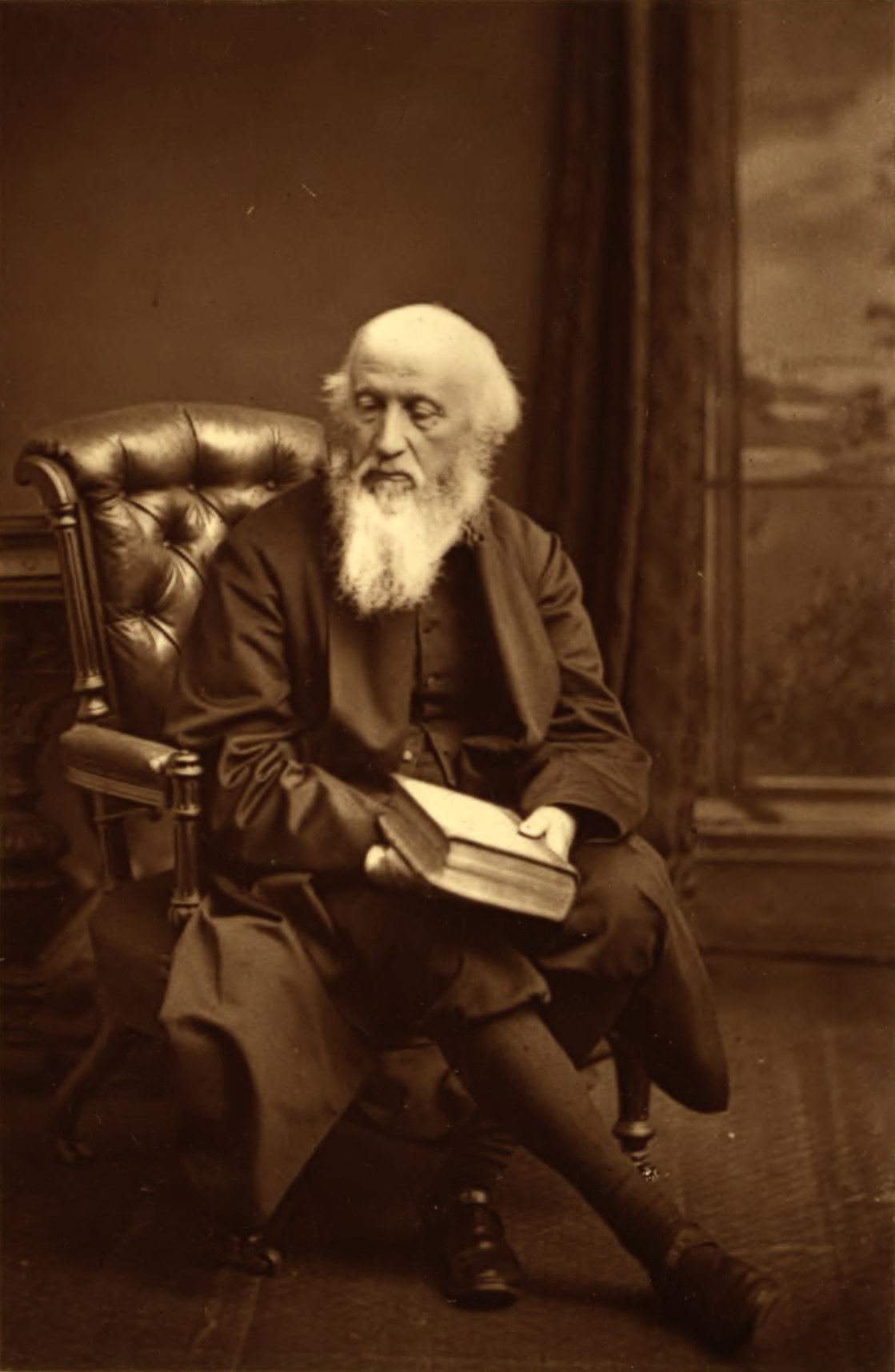
- Rev. William Barnes

Personal details
- Born: 22 February 1801 Bagber, Dorset, England
- Died: 7 October 1886 (aged 85) Winterborne Came, Dorset, England
- Buried: St Peter's Church, Winterborne Came, Dorset, England
- Denomination: Anglican
- Occupation: Poet; Anglican priest; philologist
- Education: St John's College, Cambridge

William Barnes (22 February 1801 – 7 October 1886) was an English polymath, writer, poet, philologist, priest, mathematician, engraving artist and inventor. He wrote over 800 poems, some in Dorset dialect, and much other work, including a comprehensive English grammar quoting from more than 70 different languages. A linguistic purist, Barnes strongly advocated against borrowing foreign words into English, and instead supported the use and proliferation of "strong old Anglo-Saxon speech".

== Life and work ==
Barnes was born in the parish of Bagber, Dorset, to John Barnes, a tenant-farmer in the Vale of Blackmore. The younger Barnes's formal education finished when he was 13 years old. Between 1818 and 1823 he worked in Dorchester, the county town, as a solicitor's clerk, then moved to Mere in neighbouring Wiltshire and opened a school. While he was there he began writing poetry in the Dorset dialect, as well as studying several languages—Italian, Persian, German and French, in addition to Greek and Latin—playing musical instruments (violin, piano, and flute) and practising wood-engraving. He married Julia Miles, the daughter of an exciseman from Dorchester, in 1827. In 1835 he moved back to the county town, where again he ran a school at first located on Durngate Street and subsequently on South Street. By a further move, within South Street, the school became a neighbour of an architect's practice in which Thomas Hardy was an apprentice. The architect John Hicks was interested in literature and the classics, and when disputes about grammar occurred in the practice, Hardy visited Barnes for authoritative opinions. Barnes's other literary friends included Lord Tennyson and Gerard Manley Hopkins. He was a teetotaller and vegetarian.

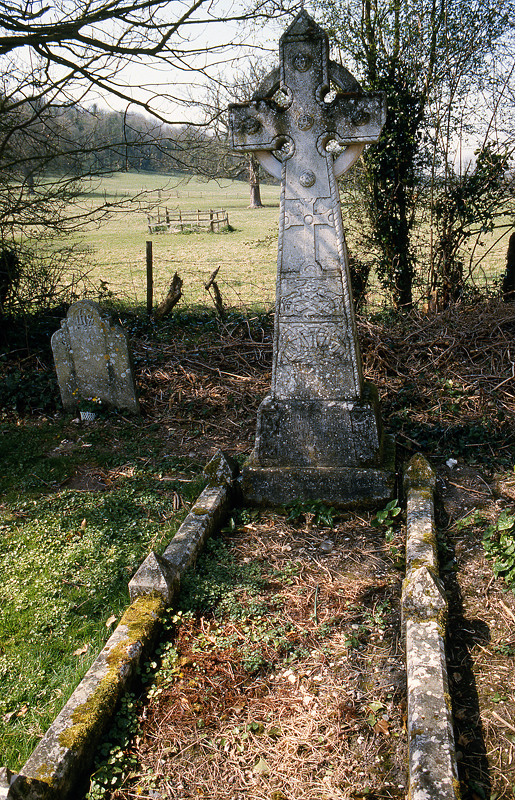
Barnes's memorial and grave at St Peter's Church, Winterborne Came

Barnes was ordained into the Church of England in 1847, taking a BD degree from St John's College, Cambridge, in 1851. He served curacies at Whitcombe Church in Whitcombe, Dorset, from 1847 to 1852, and again from 1862. He became rector of St Peter's Church, Winterborne Came, with Winterborne Farringdon, Dorset, from 1862 to his death. Shortly before his death, he was visited at Old Came Rectory by Thomas Hardy and Edmund Gosse; in a letter, Gosse wrote that Barnes was "dying as picturesquely as he lived":

We found him in bed in his study, his face turned to the window, where the light came streaming in through flowering plants, his brown books on all sides of him save one, the wall behind him being hung with old green tapestry. He had a scarlet bedgown on, a kind of soft biretta of dark red wool on his head, from which his long white hair escaped on to the pillow; his grey beard, grown very long, upon his breast; his complexion, which you recollect as richly bronzed, has become blanched by keeping indoors, and is now waxily white where it is not waxily pink; the blue eyes, half shut, restless under languid lids.

— in The Life of William Barnes (1887) by Leader Scott, p. 325, quoted in Highways & Byways in Dorset (Macmillan & Co. Ltd, 1906) by Sir Frederick Treves, pp. 364–5

"The Fall"

The length o' days ageän do shrink
An' flowers be thin in meäd, among
The eegrass a-sheenèn bright, along
Brook upon brook, an' brink by brink.

Noo starlèns do rise in vlock on wing—
Noo goocoo in nest-green leaves do sound—
Noo swallows be now a-wheelèn round—
Dip after dip, an' swing by swing.

The wheat that did leätely rustle thick
Is now up in mows that still be new,
An' yollow bevore the sky o' blue—
Tip after tip, an' rick by rick.

While now I can walk a dusty mile
I'll teäke me a day, while days be clear,
To vind a vew friends that still be dear,
Feäce after feäce, an' smile by smile.

—

Barnes first contributed the Dorset dialect poems for which he is best known to periodicals, including Macmillan's Magazine; a collection in book form Poems of Rural Life in the Dorset Dialect, was published in 1844. A second collection Hwomely Rhymes followed in 1858, and a third collection in 1863; a combined edition appeared in 1879. A "translation", Poems of Rural Life in Common English had already appeared in 1868. His philological works include Philological Grammar (1854), Se Gefylsta, an Anglo-Saxon Delectus (1849), Tiw, or a View of Roots (1862), and a Glossary of Dorset Dialect (1863), and among his other writings is a slim volume on "the Advantages of a More Common Adoption of The Mathematics as a Branch of Education, or Subject of Study", published in 1834.

Barnes is buried in Winterborne Came churchyard beneath a Celtic cross. The plinth of the cross has the inscription: 'In Memory of William Barnes, Died 7 October 1886. Aged 86 Years. For 24 Years Rector of this Parish. This Memorial was raised to his Memory by his Children and Grandchildren." On 4 February 1889 a bronze statue of William Barnes by Edwin Roscoe Mullins (1848–1907) was unveiled outside St Peter's Church in High West Street, Dorchester.

Ralph Vaughan Williams set to music four of Barnes' poems: "My Orcha'd in Lindèn Lea" and "Blackmwore Maidens" in their "Common English" versions ("Linden Lea" and "Blackmwore by the Stour", respectively), "The Winter's Willow", and "In the Spring".

=== Linguistic purism ===
Barnes had a strong interest in linguistics; he was fluent in Greek, Latin, French, Hebrew, Hindi, Italian, Russian, Welsh, Cornish and Old English. He called for the purification of English by removal of Greek, Latin and foreign influences so that it might be better understood by those without a classical education. His coinages included such words as sun-print for photograph, wortlore for botany, and welkinfire for meteor. His strain of purism resembles the later "blue-eyed English" of composer Percy Grainger, and in certain instances the terms in David Cowley's How We'd Talk if the English had WON in 1066.

=== Style ===
Uniquely fond of the Dorset dialect, which he felt to be particularly near to English's Anglo-Saxon roots, Barnes wrote many of his poems in the local parlance of Dorset. Additionally, as well as avoiding the use of foreign words in his poetry, Barnes frequently employed alliterative verse, the repetition of consonantal sounds. Examples of this can be heard in the lines "Do lean down low in Linden Lea" and "In our abode in Arby Wood".

== See also ==
- British literature
- West Country dialects
- Lucy Baxter, Barnes's third daughter who wrote The Life of William Barnes: Poet and Philologist (1887) under the name "Leader Scott"
- T. L. Burton, author of several books on Barnes's poetry
