= Winterborne Farringdon =

Deserted village in Dorset

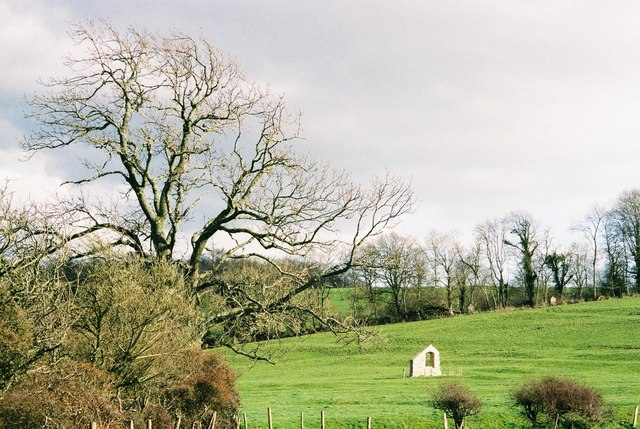
- The site of the village, showing the remaining wall of the church, viewed from the east

- Location within Dorset
- 50°41′35″N 2°25′44″W
- Location: near Dorchester, Dorset
- OS grid reference: SY 698 882

Scheduled monument
- Designated: 8 June 1959
- Reference no.: 1020550

Winterborne Farringdon (or Winterbourne Farringdon) is a deserted village in Dorset, England, 1.5 miles south of Dorchester. Its lands are now incorporated into the adjacent settlements of Winterborne Came and Winterborne Herringston. There are substantial ground traces, and a remaining wall of St German's Church.

Although there is no civil parish, the name is used for Winterborne Farringdon Parish Council (Group) which includes the civil parishes of Bincombe, Whitcombe, Winterborne Came, Winterborne Herringston and Winterborne Monkton.

== History ==
St German's church was not included in the Taxatio Ecclesiastica of 1291. The village was recorded in 1397; in 1428 the village was not taxed because there were fewer than ten residents. From the late 16th century both Farringdon and Came were often served by the same incumbent.

In 1650, the union of the churches of Farringdon and Came was proposed, since it was observed that there were only three households in Farringdon, and few in Came. In 1773 it was noted that the village had been depopulated for some time.

== Description ==
The site is along a valley floor, with a stream (the South Winterborne) to the north and gently rising land to the south. The remains are in two blocks with a featureless area between, together covering about 8 hectares (20 acres). In the west are ten enclosures, probably the plots of individual properties; some building platforms can be discerned. There are several trackways, width 1.5 to 3.0 metres (4 ft 11 in to 9 ft 10 in), and 0.5 metres (1 ft 8 in) deep.

Near the centre of the western block is St German's Church. The remains of the church are Grade II listed. The east wall is standing; this is thought to be an 18th- or 19th-century rebuilding, incorporating a 14th-century window. The rectangular foundations of the church can be seen.

In the eastern block of earthworks there are at least four enclosures. There is one discernible building platform, and an oval embanked depression which was perhaps a pond. The eastern block may have been part of the remains of Winterborne Came.

On the slope of the hill to the south, lynchets survive as low earthworks; they are part of the field system related to the village.

== See also ==
- List of lost settlements in the United Kingdom
