= Whitcombe Church =

Church in Dorset, England

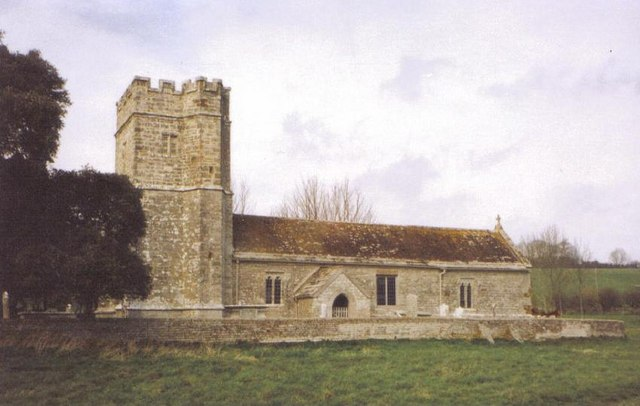

- Location within Dorset
- 50°41′37″N 2°24′09″W
- Location: Whitcombe, Dorset, England

History
- Built: 12th century

Listed Building – Grade I
- Official name: Parish Church (Dedication Unknown)
- Designated: 26 July 1956
- Reference no.: 1119215

Whitcombe Church in Whitcombe, Dorset, England was built in the 12th century. It is recorded in the National Heritage List for England as a designated Grade I listed building, and is now a redundant church in the care of the Churches Conservation Trust. It was declared redundant on 29 October 1971, and was vested in the Trust on 12 February 1973.

The site of the church was used for worship in the Saxon era and there are fragments of two Saxon crosses. The nave of Whitcombe Church dates from the 12th century, with the chancel being added in the 15th. The tower was added in the late 16th century.

The interior includes several wall paintings, including one of St Christopher, and a 13th-century Purbeck marble font.

William Barnes the English writer, poet, minister, and philologist was the curate at Whitcombe from 1847 to 1852, and again from 1862 preaching his first and last sermons in the church. He wrote over 800 poems, some in Dorset dialect and much other work including a comprehensive English grammar quoting from more than 70 different languages.

== See also ==
- List of churches preserved by the Churches Conservation Trust in South West England
