= Book of Sydrac =

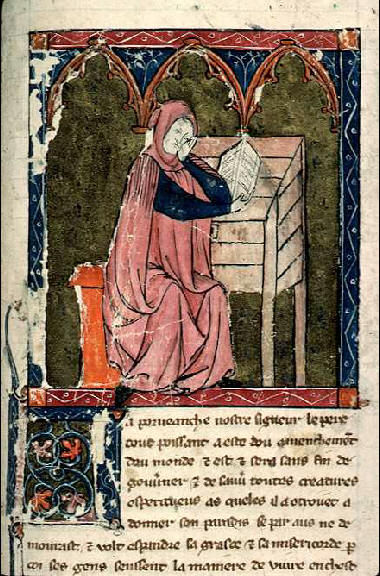
Sydrac reading

The Book of Sydrac the Philosopher, also known as the Livre de la fontaine de toutes sciences, is an anonymous philosophical work written between 1270 and 1300 in Old French. It was enormously popular through the 16th century and received translations into numerous languages, among which was the late-medieval English translation called Sidrak and Bokkus.

== Contents ==
The Book of Sydrac presents a dialogue between an ancient Babylonian king named Boctus and a philosopher named Sydrac; the former asks a series of 1227 questions, while the latter responds. The result is a text that is a potpourri of the popular culture of the Later Middle Ages, covering subjects like philosophy, religion, morality, medicine, astrology, the virtues of plants and minerals, etc.

Boctus' questions are often connected with religious matters as Sidrak tries to teach Bokkus to believe in the one true God of the Hebrew Bible. Sidrak also predicts the birth of Jesus, still many centuries in the future, and repeatedly explains how this will fulfill God's covenant with his believers.

Many of the other exchanges are less theological. Health and medicine are two of the most common themes addressed by Sidrak and his explanations rely on a simplistic version of the four-humor theory of the ancient Greeks. Other questions revolve around fashion, marriage, sex, business and geography.

== Circulation ==
The Book of Sydrac survives in more than sixty medieval manuscript copies, either whole or fragmentary, and with many variants. Between the fourteenth and sixteenth centuries the texts were translated into Occitan, Italian, Catalan, German, Dutch, English. It also received several Renaissance printings: in Paris at least two editions by Antoine Vérard before 1500 (of which one was from 1486), an edition by Galliot du Pré in 1531, and several others; and in the Netherlands 11 editions between 1495 and 1564.

More recently T. L. Burton edited a two-volume version of the English Sidrak and Bokkus, in which he exhaustively compared the two most complete English recensions both with each other and with the French original. The English translations date from the late fifteenth to early sixteenth centuries, while the French original is from the thirteenth century. The late Middle English is considerably closer to Modern English, and therefore easier for modern readers to understand, than is the Middle English of Chaucer's Canterbury Tales.

In an extensive introduction, Burton asks how Sidrak and Bokkus was so widely read in the Middle Ages but failed to leave any appreciable influence on later literature. His answer is that while immensely popular, the book itself is rather unsophisticated in both its language and the general quality of its information. Sidrak's answers are often formulaic and frequently fail to directly answer the questions posed by Bokkus.

== Bibliography ==
=== Editions and translations ===
- Sidrak and Bokkus, A Parallel-Text Edition from Bodleian Library, MS Laud Misc. 559, and British Library, MS Lansdowne 793. Edited by T. L. Burton. Vol. 1 ISBN 0-19-722315-X, Vol. 2 ISBN 0-19-722316-8
- Sydrac le philosophe: le livre de la fontaine de toutes sciences: edition des enzyklopädischen Lehrdialogs aus dem XIII. Jahrhundert. (editor) Ernstpeter Ruhe. Wiesbaden : Dr. L. Reichert Verlag, 2000.
- Il "Libro di Sidrac" salentino. (editor) Paola Sgrilli. Pisa: Pacini, 1983.
- The boke of demaundes: of the scyence of phylosophye, and astronomye, betwene kynge Boctus, and the phylosopher Sydracke. [London]: Imprinted by me Robert Wyer, dwellynge in the Duke of Suffolkes rentes, besyde charynge Crosse, [ca. 1550].
- The history of kyng Boccus, [and] Sydracke : how he confoundyd his lerned men, and in ye syght of them dronke stronge venym in the name of the Trinite [and] dyd hym no hurt. Also his diuynyte that he lerned of the boke of Noe. Also his profycyes that he had by reuelacyo[n] of the aungell. Also his answeris to the questions of wysdome, both morall and natural wyth moche worldly wysdome contayned in noumber. CCC.lxv. translatyd by Hugo of Caumpeden, out of frenche into Englysshe. [Prynted at London : By Thomas Godfray. At the coste and charge of dan Robert Saltwode mo[n]ke of saynt Austens at Cantorbury, 1537?

=== Scholarship ===
- Ernest Renan et Gaston Paris, « La Fontaine de toutes sciences du philosophe Sidrach », Histoire littéraire de la France, t. XXXI, Paris, 1893, p.287-291.
- William M. Holler, « The Ordinary Man's Concept of Nature as Reflected in the Thirteenth-Century French Book of Sydrac », The French Review, vol. 48, n°3, fév. 1975, p. 526-538.
- Beate Wins, « Le Livre de Sidrac, Stand der Forschung und neue Ergebnisse », in Horst Brunner et Norbert R. Wolf (dir.), Wissensliteratur im Mittelalter und in der frühen Neuzeit : Bedingungen, Typen, Publikum, Sprache, Wiesbaden, Reichert, 1993, p. 36-52.
- Brigitte Weisel, « Die Überlieferung des Livre de Sidrac in Handschriften und Drucken », Ibid., p. 53-66.
- Françoise Fery-Hue, « Sidrac et les pierres précieuses », Revue d'histoire des textes 28, 1998, p. 93-181 (complément : RHT 30, 2000, p. 315-321).
- Chantal Connochie-Bourgne, « La tour de Boctus le bon roi dans le Livre de Sydrach », in Francis Gingras, Françoise Laurent, Frédérique Le Nan et Jean-René Valette (dir.), "Furent les merveilles pruvees et les aventures truvees" : Hommage à Francis Dubost, Paris, Champion, 2005, p. 163-176.
- Ernstpeter Ruhe, « L'invention d'un prophète : Le Livre de Sydrac », in Richard Trachsler, Julien Abed et David Expert (dir.), Moult obscures paroles. Études sur la prophétie médiévale, Paris, PUPS (coll. Cultures et civilisations médiévales, 39), 2007, p. 65-78.
- Sylvie-Marie Steiner,"D'un texte à l'autre, d'une langue vernaculaire à l'autre. Édition bilingue du "bestiaire" du Livre de Sidrac (BnF fr. 1158 et BnF fr. 1160),"La France latine. Revue d'études d'Oc". Nouvelle série n°148, 2009, p. 75-104.
- Sylvie-Marie Steiner, "La traduction occitane du Livre de Sidrac dans la tradition manuscrite. Éléments pour une édition critique du manuscrit de la Bibliothèque nationale de France, français 1158". ),"La France latine. Revue d'études d'Oc". Nouvelle série n°156, 2013, p. 9-187.
