= Old Came Rectory =

Building in Dorset, England

Coordinates: 50°42′12″N 2°24′48″W

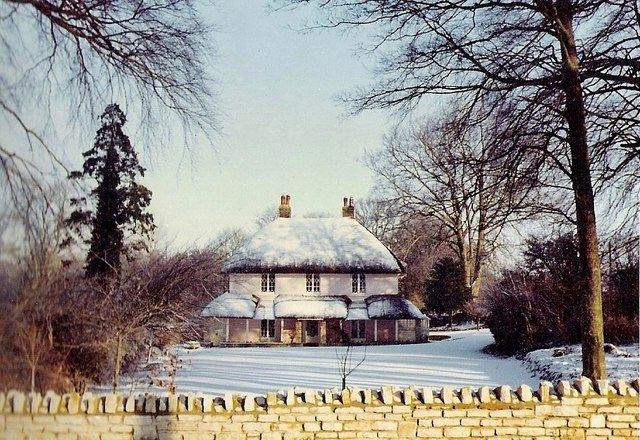
Old Came Rectory, photographed by Sarah Smith in 1966

Old Came Rectory is a former rectory on the A352 road in Winterborne Came, Dorset, England. It was built in the 19th century for the Reverend William England in a rustic cottage orné style from a plan by the architect John Nash. It is a two-storey building with a thatched roof and walls of cob and rendered rubble. It was subsequently the home of William Barnes, who became the rector in 1862 and lived there until he died in 1886. Thomas Hardy visited him there many times, and other literary tenants and guests have included Tennyson, Coventry Patmore, Edmund Gosse, Francis Palgrave, Siegfried Sassoon, Edmund Blunden and T. E. Lawrence.

The building was listed for protection as Grade II in 1956. Features include three thatched verandas, french windows and a large garden which contains an orchard and well.

== See also ==
- Thomas Hardy's Cottage
