= T. L. Burton =

Australian academic

T. L. Burton (Thomas Lingen (Tom) Burton; born 1944) is an emeritus professor at the University of Adelaide and a scholar of medieval English literature and language, and of historical and regional dialects. He is the editor of the two-volume Sidrak and Bokkus, which once was one of the most popular books in Middle English. In addition to his publications on Middle English, Burton has written books for a more general audience. He is the founding director of the Chaucer Studio, a non-profit organization which produces recordings in period pronunciation of medieval and early modern texts and makes these available as instructional aids. Burton's current research interest is in the poetry of William Barnes and he has organized several performances of Barnes's poetry in the poet's original Dorset dialect for the Adelaide Fringe Festival.

Burton has won several major prizes for his teaching.

== Selected Publications ==
=== Editing ===
- Burton, T. L. 'Mistranslation or Adaptation in Medieval Manuscripts: Can One Tell the Difference?' Lingua Humanitatis 2.2 (Oct. 2002): 129-41.
- Burton, T. L. Sidrak and Bokkus: A Parallel-Text Edition from Bodleian Library, MS Laud Misc. 559 and British Library, MS Lansdowne 793. 2 Vols, Early English Text Society, Original Series 311 and 312. Oxford: Oxford UP, 1998–99.
- Burton, T. L. ‘Proverbs, Sentences, and Proverbial Phrases from the English Sidrak'. Mediaeval Studies 51 (1989): 329–54.
- Burton, T. L. ‘The Crocodile as the Symbol of an Evil Woman: A Medieval Interpretation of the Crocodile–Trochilus Relationship'. Parergon 20 (1978): 25–33.
- Burton, T. L. ‘Late Fifteenth-Century "Terms of Association" in MS Pepys 1047'. Notes and Queries 223 (1978): 7–12.
- Burton, T. L. ‘Sidrak on Reproduction and Sexual Love'. Medical History 19 (1975): 286–302.

=== Middle English dialectology ===
- Burton, T. L. 'On the Current State of Middle English Dialectology'. Leeds Studies in English NS 22 (1991): 167–208. [Discussing A Linguistic Atlas of Late Mediaeval English, by Angus McIntosh, M. L. Samuels, and Michael Benskin (Aberdeen UP, 1986).]

=== William Barnes ===
- Burton, T. L. 'What William Barnes Done: Dilution of the Dialect in Later Versions of the Poems Of Rural Life.' Review of English Studies 58 (2007): 338–63.
- Burton, T. L. William Barnes's Dialect Poems: A Pronunciation Guide. The Chaucer Studio Press. 2010.
- Burton, T. L. and K. K. Ruthven, eds. The Complete Poems of William Barnes: Volume 1. Oxford University Press. 2013. Volume 2. 2018.
- Burton, T. L. The Sound of William Barnes's Dialect Poems. Volume 1. University of Adelaide Press. 2013. Volume 2. 2017. Volume 3. 2017.
- Burton, T. L. 'What Sex Is a Mare? Horses and Mares in William Barnes's Dialect Poems'. Notes and Queries 63 (2016): 237–44.
- Burton, T. L. 'Manuscripts of William Barnes's Dialect Poems in the Dorset County Chronicle'. Proceedings of the Dorset County Chronicle 138 (2017): 46–63.
- Burton, T. L. and Emma Mason, eds. William Barnes, Dialect Poems in the Dorset County Chronicle. Edinburgh University Press. 2026.

=== General ===
- Burton, Tom. Words, Words, Words. University Radio 5UV, 1995
- Burton, Tom. Words in Your Ear. Wakefield Press, 1999,
- Burton, Tom. Long Words Bother Me. Sutton Publishing, 2004. This is the UK republication, in one volume, of the two above-cited works, with additional material.
