= Bagber =

Hamlet in Dorset, England

Coordinates: 50.9221°N 2.3514°W

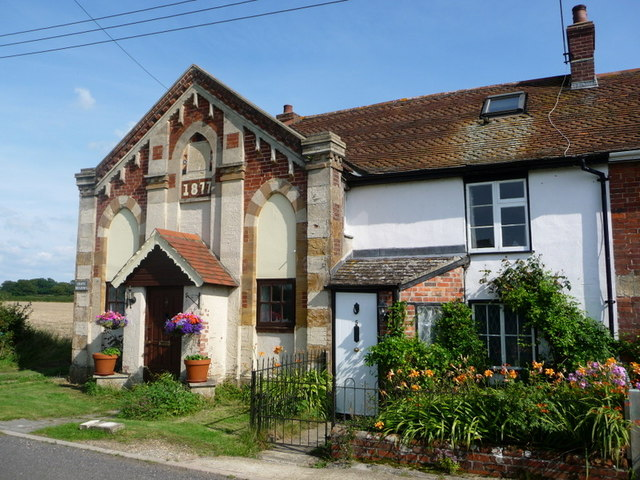
- Former Methodist chapel, Bagber

- Location within Dorset
- OS grid reference: ST7513
- Civil parish: Sturminster Newton
- Unitary authority: Dorset
- Ceremonial county: Dorset
- Region: South West
- Country: England
- Sovereign state: United Kingdom
- Post town: Sturminster Newton
- Postcode district: DT10
- Police: Dorset
- Fire: Dorset and Wiltshire
- Ambulance: South Western
- UK Parliament: North Dorset

Bagber is a hamlet in the county of Dorset in southern England, situated about 2 miles (3.2 km) west and northwest of Sturminster Newton in the Dorset unitary authority. It consists of Bagber, Lower Bagber and Bagber Common, which all lie within Sturminster Newton civil parish. Chapel Row consists of around ten houses in total, six of which are within 300 metres (980 ft) of the main A357. These six date back to the 19th century; the chapel is no. 6.

The poet William Barnes was born in Bagber in 1801.
