= St Peter's Church, Winterborne Came =

Church in Dorset, England

St Peter's Church
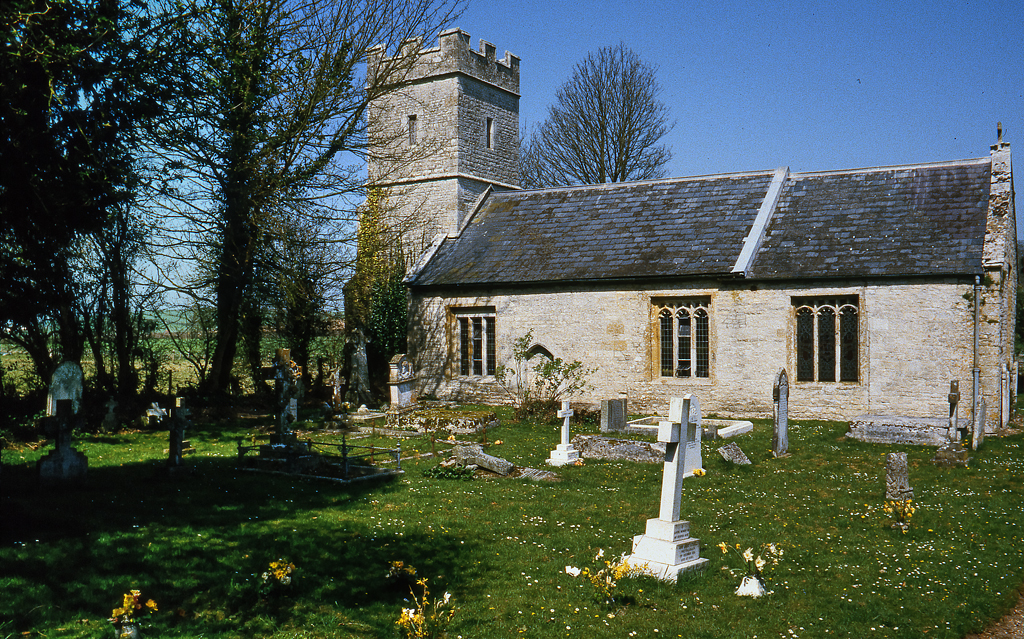

- Location within Dorset
- 50°41′40.1″N 2°25′09.9″W
- Location: Winterborne Came, Dorset, England

History
- Built: 14th century

Listed Building – Grade I
- Official name: Parish Church of St Peter
- Designated: 26 January 1956
- Reference no.: 1323962

St Peter's Church in Winterborne Came, Dorset, England was built in the 14th century. It is recorded in the National Heritage List for England as a designated Grade I listed building, and is now a redundant church in the care of the Churches Conservation Trust. It was vested in the Trust on 1 March 1989.

The nave dates from the 14th century and the current chancel is from a 15th-century rebuilding. Later in the 15th century the west tower was added and the nave refenestrated. The interior includes an octagonal 14th century font and an oak pulpit from 1624.

The Revd William Barnes, the English writer, poet, minister, and philologist, was the rector of the church from 1862 to 1886. He is buried in the churchyard beneath a Celtic cross. The plinth of the cross has the inscription: 'In Memory of William Barnes, Died 7 October 1886. Aged 86 Years. For 24 Years Rector of this Parish. This Memorial was raised to his Memory by his Children and Grandchildren."

== See also ==
- List of churches preserved by the Churches Conservation Trust in South West England
