= Dak-bokkeum-tang =

Korean dish of braised spicy chicken

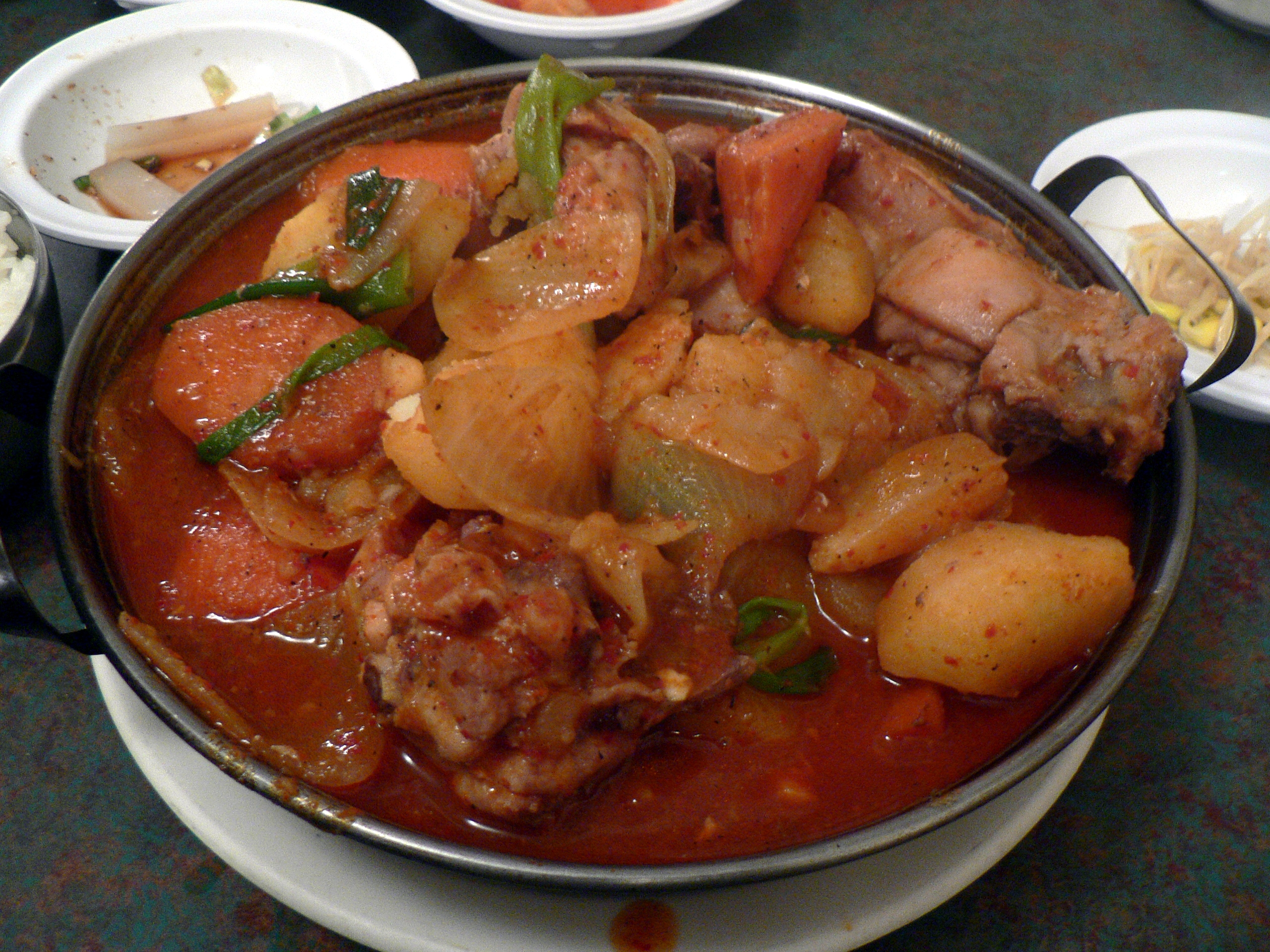
- Type: Jjim
- Place of origin: Korea
- Associated cuisine: Korean cuisine
- Serving temperature: Warm
- Main ingredients: Chicken

Korean name
- Hangul: 닭도리탕
- Hanja: 닭도리湯
- RR: dakdoritang
- MR: taktorit'ang
- IPA: takt͈oɾitʰaŋ

Alternate name
- Hangul: 닭볶음탕
- RR: dakbokkeumtang
- MR: takpokkŭmt'ang

Dak-bokkeum-tang (Korean: 닭볶음탕), also known as dak-dori-tang (닭도리탕) or braised spicy chicken, is a traditional Korean dish made by boiling chunks of chicken with vegetables and spices. The ingredients are sometimes stir-fried before being boiled. It is a jjim or jorim-like dish, and the recipe varies across the Korean peninsula. Common ingredients include potatoes, carrots, green and red chili peppers, dried red chili peppers, scallions, onions, garlic, ginger, gochujang (chili paste), gochutgaru (chili powder), soy sauce, and sesame oil.

== Etymology debate ==
Some groups advocating linguistic purism in Korean argue against the use of the term dak-dori-tang (닭도리탕) due to the perception that it is a Japanese-Korean hybrid, though the etymology of the middle word dori (도리) is not definitively known. In South Korea, the National Institute of the Korean Language claims that the word came from Japanese tori (鳥; "bird"), and suggests that the word should be refined into dak-bokkeum-tang (닭볶음탕). However, the status of dori as a loanword has been subject to debate. This is because the institute has not presented the grounds for the argument besides the phonetic similarity of dori to the Japanese word tori. The word dori-tang appears in Haedong jukji, a 1925 collection of poems by the Joseon literatus Choe Yeongnyeon. In the book, Chinese characters do (桃) ri (李) tang (湯) were used to transliterate the Korean dish name. A food columnist argued that, had the word been Japanese, the character jo (鳥; pronounced tori in Japanese) would have been used instead of the hanja transliteration of the Korean pronunciation. Alternative theories on the origin of dori include the assertions that it came from dyori (됴리), the archaic form of Sino-Korean word jori (조리; 調理; "to cook"), and that it came from the native Korean verb dorida (도리다; "to cut out"). None of the theories mentioned before has been widely accepted as the established etymology.

== See also ==
- Dapanji, a similar Uyghur/Chinese dish
