= Icelandic Language Institute =

The Icelandic Language Institute (Íslensk málstöð), founded in 1985, was responsible for the planning and preservation of the Icelandic language. The Icelandic Language Institute was a department within the Ministry of Education, Science, and Culture of Iceland, and its role was to officially answer questions regarding characteristics of the Icelandic Language, as well as to provide benchmarks and guidelines for educators of Icelandic.

Starting in 1997, The Icelandic Language Institute created a database on the internet, which contained 52 special glossaries compiled for use in specific areas of focus. While all of these glossaries contain Icelandic words, some are bilingual, including terms taken from English, Danish, Norwegian, Swedish, German and French, among other languages.

In September 2006, the Icelandic Language Institute was merged with four other institutes to form the Árni Magnússon Institute for Icelandic Studies.
