= Whitcombe, Dorset =

Village and civil parish in Dorset, England

Coordinates: 50.692597°N 2.401403°W

Whitcombe
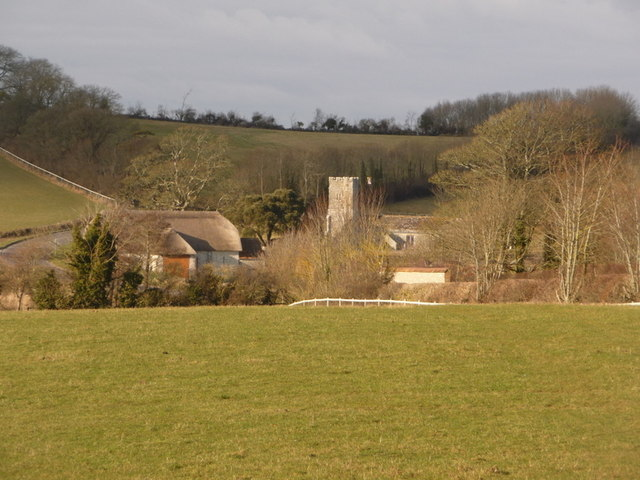
- View of Whitcombe from the south

- Location within Dorset
- Population: 20
- OS grid reference: SY717882
- Unitary authority: Dorset
- Ceremonial county: Dorset
- Region: South West
- Country: England
- Sovereign state: United Kingdom
- Post town: DORCHESTER
- Postcode district: DT2
- Dialling code: 01305
- Police: Dorset
- Fire: Dorset and Wiltshire
- Ambulance: South Western
- UK Parliament: West Dorset

Whitcombe is a small village and civil parish in the Dorset unitary authority area of Dorset, England, situated 2 miles (3.2 km) southeast of Dorchester. Dorset County Council's 2013 mid-year estimate of the population of the parish is 20.

Whitcombe village is next to the A352 main road between Broadmayne and Dorchester, between the parishes of West Knighton and Broadmayne to the east, West Stafford to the north, and Winterborne Came to the west. Whitcombe does not form an ecclesiastical parish, although Whitcombe Church has registers dating from 1762. The earlier registers were destroyed in a fire. The church, now redundant, is in a "modest but perfect location" according to Pevsner.

In the surrounding area there are a number of prehistoric earthworks. Whitcombe was originally recorded as Widecome, with a land measurement of two hides. King Athelstan gave it to the Milton Abbey. At the time of the Dissolution of the Monasteries, its ownership passed to the King. Around 1600, it was sold to a Mr Hull from Tolpuddle.

Whitcombe Hill is located 0.25 miles (0.40 km) west of the church. A Portland stone relief of a bearded man on horseback, dating from 2nd–3rd century AD, was found here in 1963 and subsequently added to the collection of the Dorset Museum in Dorchester.

There are a Grade II listed manor house, riding stables and a tithe barn at Whitcombe.
