= Winterborne Came =

Civil parish in Dorset, England

Coordinates: 50.6944°N 2.4173°W

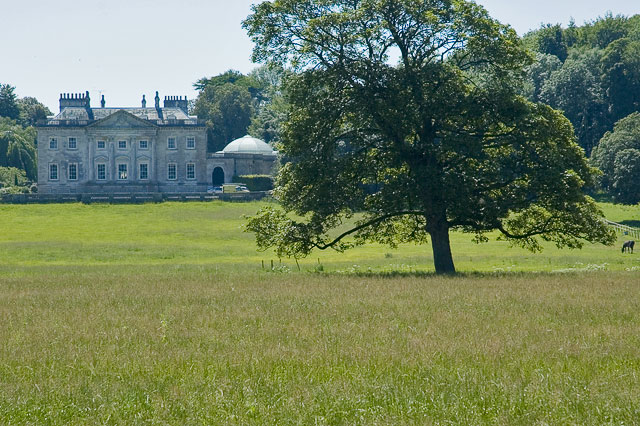
- Came House, Winterborne Came

- Location within Dorset
- Population: 40
- OS grid reference: SY706883
- Unitary authority: Dorset
- Ceremonial county: Dorset
- Region: South West
- Country: England
- Sovereign state: United Kingdom
- Post town: Dorchester
- Postcode district: DT2
- Police: Dorset
- Fire: Dorset and Wiltshire
- Ambulance: South Western

Winterborne Came is a small dispersed settlement and civil parish in the county of Dorset in England, situated in the west of the county, approximately 1 mile (1.6 km) south-east of the county town Dorchester. Dorset County Council's 2013 mid-year estimate of the parish population was 40.

Winterborne Came derives its name from the seasonal stream ('winterborne') by which it is sited, and from the town of Caen in France, as it was once owned by the Abbey of St. Stephen there. The parish consists of Came House, built in 1754 in the Palladian style, the nearby Perpendicular St. Peter's Church, a couple of farms, and an old rectory on the Dorchester to Wareham road, where for 25 years the Dorset dialect poet William Barnes lived when he was the incumbent rector. Barnes died in the rectory and is buried in the churchyard. About 100 metres west of the church is the site of the deserted village of Winterborne Farringdon, which has been depopulated since at least the 18th century.
