= Linguistic purism in Korean =

Linguistic nationalism in Korea

Linguistic purism in the Korean language is the belief that words of native Korean origin should be used in place of foreign-derived "loanwords". This belief has been the focus of movements in both North and South Korea, where adherents have sought to deter the use of loanwords, regardless of whether they have been formally adopted into the Korean language. Of primary interest has been the replacement of Japanese-influenced loanwords (especially from the period of Japanese forced occupation) when the Korean language faced multiple hardships and was discouraged in favor of Japanese, although the specific policies differ between the North and South.

== North Korea ==
North Korea is known for eliminating most loanwords, which comprise most of the language differences between North and South. Unlike South Korea, where hanja has been intermittently used in texts, North Korea abolished the usage of Chinese characters in 1949. Many loanwords with hanja, especially academic words that were introduced during the Japanese occupation, were replaced with native vocabulary. Some examples include:

- 관절 (kwanjŏl) (關節, joint/articular surface) → 마디 (madi)
- 멸균 (myŏlgyun) (滅菌, sterilization) → 균깡그리죽이기 (kyunkkanggŭrijugigi)
- 호흡 (hohŭp) (呼吸, breathing) → 숨쉬기 (sumshwigi)
- 용량 (yongnyang) (容量, amount) → 들이 (tŭri)
- 광원 (kwangwŏn) (光源, light source) → 빛샘 (pissaem)
- 염색체 (yŏmsaekch'e) (染色體, chromosome) → 물들체 (muldŭlch'e)

== South Korea ==
In South Korea, the National Institute of the Korean Language maintains an exhaustive dictionary of refined (purified) language. A refined version is created and decided on by online voting.

=== Japanese colonialism ===
Notably, loanwords from Japanese that were introduced to Korea during the Japanese forced occupation are considered to have a political subtext of colonization and are often subject to refinement. Some words that were transliterations of Japanese words were refined in 1948:

- 시로또 (sirotto) (素人, amateur/novice) → 맹문이 (maengmuni), 날무지 (nalmuji)
- 분빠이 (punppai) (分配, distribution) → 누누매기 (nunumaegi)

Some critics of the movement argue that, instead of forcefully finding an equivalent translation for every loanword, the movement must promote the usage of widespread loanwords.

A recent example is the Korean spicy chicken dish dak-dori-tang (닭도리탕), where the etymology of the middle word dori (도리) is not definitively known, although suggested as a Japanese-Korean hybrid. In South Korea, the National Institute of the Korean Language claims that the word came from Japanese tori (鳥; "bird"), and suggests that the word should be refined into dak-bokkeum-tang (닭볶음탕). However, the status of dori as a loanword has been subject to debate. This is because the institute has not presented the grounds for the argument besides the phonetic similarity of dori to the Japanese word tori. The word dori-tang appears in Haedong jukji, a 1925 collection of poems by the Joseon literatus Choe Yeongnyeon. In the book, Chinese characters do (桃) ri (李) tang (湯) were used to transliterate the Korean dish name. A food columnist argued that, had the word been Japanese, the character jo (鳥; pronounced tori in Japanese) would have been used instead of the hanja transliteration of the Korean pronunciation. Alternative theories on the origin of dori include the assertions that it came from dyori (됴리), the archaic form of Sino-Korean word jori (조리; 調理; "to cook"), and that it came from the native Korean verb dorida (도리다; "to cut out"). None of these theories have been widely accepted as the established etymology.
