= Linguistic purism in English =

Efforts to reduce foreign terms in English

Purism in the linguistic field is the historical trend of languages to conserve intact their lexical structure of word families, in opposition to foreign influences which are considered 'impure'. Historically, linguistic purism in English is a reaction to the great number of borrowings in the English language from other languages, especially Old French, since the Norman conquest of England, and some of its native vocabulary and grammar have been supplanted by features of Latinate and Greek origin. Efforts to remove or consider the removal of foreign terms in English are often known as Anglish, a term coined by author and humorist Paul Jennings in 1966.

English linguistic purism has persisted in diverse forms since the inkhorn term controversy of the early modern period. In its mildest form, purism stipulates the use of native terms instead of loanwords. In stronger forms, new words are coined from Germanic roots (such as wordstock for vocabulary) or revived from older stages of English (such as shrithe for proceed). Noted purists of Early Modern English include John Cheke, Thomas Wilson, Ralph Lever, Richard Rowlands, and Nathaniel Fairfax. Modern linguistic purists include William Barnes, Charles Dickens, Gerard Manley Hopkins, Elias Molee, Percy Grainger, and George Orwell.

== History ==
=== Middle English ===
English words gave way to borrowings from Anglo-Norman following the Norman Conquest as English lost ground as a language of prestige. Anglo-Norman was used in schools and dominated literature, nobility and higher life, leading a wealth of French loanwords to enter English over the course of several centuries—English only returned to courts of law in 1362, and to government in the following century.

Notwithstanding, some texts of early Middle English engaged in linguistic purism, deliberately avoiding excessive Anglo-Norman influence. Layamon's Brut, composed in the late 12th or early 13th century, espoused several features of Old English poetic style and used a predominantly Anglo-Saxon vocabulary. Ancrene Wisse, of the same era, allowed for French and Old Norse loans but maintained conservative spelling and syntax to keep with Old English. Ayenbite of Inwyt, a Kentish translation of a French treatise on morality written about a century earlier, used calques to avoid borrowing from French.

=== Early Modern English ===
Controversy over inkhorn terms—foreign loanwords perceived to be needless—persisted in the 16th and 17th centuries. Among others, Thomas Elyot, a neologiser, borrowed extensively from abroad in support of "the necessary augmentation" of English. Linguistic purists such as John Cheke opposed this borrowing in favour of keeping English "unmixt and unmangled". Thomas Wilson, a contemporary of Cheke, criticised borrowing from foreign languages as seeking an "outlandish English".

=== Modern English ===
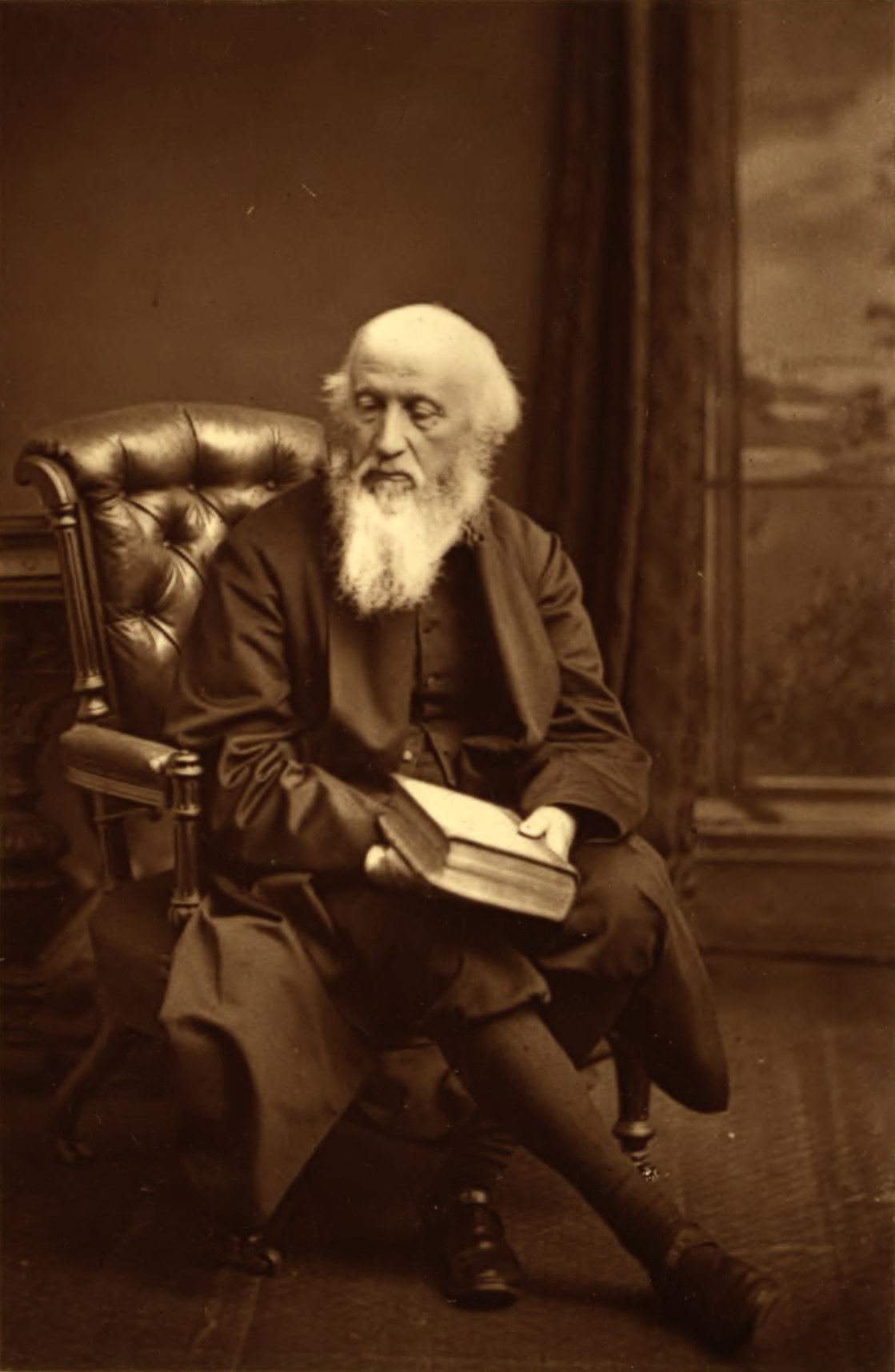
William Barnes, a 19th-century poet and linguistic purist

With the influx of new industrial and scientific terms from Greek and Latin, linguistic purism saw renewed interest in the 19th century. U.S. President Thomas Jefferson observed in an 1825 letter that "a taste is reviving in England for the recovery of the Anglo-Saxon dialect". Dorset poet, minister, and philologist William Barnes coined several words to promote "strong old Anglo-Saxon speech", including speechcraft for grammar, birdlore for ornithology, and bendsome for flexible. Poet Gerard Manley Hopkins discussed Barnes in an 1882 letter to Robert Bridges, lamenting the "utter hopelessness" of Barnes's purism but nonetheless writing in support of it, claiming that "no beauty in a language can make up for want of purity". Charles Dickens emphasised the importance of Germanic elements of English during this period, stressing that a writer should not "seek abroad" for new words.

The fifth rule of vocabulary in The King's English, published in 1917, suggests that writers should "prefer the Saxon word to the Romance". In his 1946 essay "Politics and the English Language", George Orwell criticised the extensive use of "foreign" words in English. Australian composer Percy Grainger, a contemporary of Orwell, invented a "blue-eyed English" that he perceived to be linguistically pure and preferred the use of English words in the place of traditional Italian music terms. One year after Grainger's death, philologist Lee Hollander emphasised in his 1962 translation of the Poetic Edda—a collection of Old Norse poems—that "Germanic material must be drawn upon to the utmost extent ... because of the tang and flavor still residing in the homelier indigenous speech material".

Paul Jennings coined the term "Anglish" in a three-part series in Punch commemorating the 900th anniversary of the Norman conquest of England. Jennings's articles, entitled "1066 and All Saxon" and published in June 1966, envisioned an England in which the conquest had failed and included linguistically pure English passages; Jennings gave "a bow to William Barnes" as an inspiration. In 1989, science fiction writer Poul Anderson released a similarly-written text about basic atomic theory called Uncleftish Beholding composed almost fully of Germanic-rooted words. In 1997, Douglas Hofstadter jokingly entitled the style "Ander-Saxon".

The September 2009 publication How We'd Talk if the English had Won in 1066 by David Cowley updates Old English words to today's English spelling, seeking mainstream appeal by covering words in five grades ranging from "easy" to "weird and wonderful" and giving many examples of use with drawings and tests. Paul Kingsnorth's 2014 The Wake is written in a hybrid of Old English and Modern English to account for its 1066 milieu, and Edmund Fairfax's 2017 satiric literary novel Outlaws is similarly written in a "constructed" form of English consisting almost exclusively of words of Germanic origin. An online newsletter called The Anglish Times has regularly reported on current events without non-Germanic borrowed words since January 2021.

Conversely, there is Anglese, an inkhornish style of English that exclusively uses Latinate or greek words.

== See also ==
- Linguistic purism
- Word family
- Constrained writing
- Plain English, a variety of English written specifically for clarity
- List of Germanic and Latinate equivalents in English
