= Uncleftish Beholding =

Short text written in English using exclusively Germanic words

- Presented: 1989
- Author: Poul Anderson
- Subject: Atomic theory
- Purpose: Linguistic purism in English

"Uncleftish Beholding" is a short text by Poul Anderson, first published in the Mid-December 1989 issue of the magazine Analog Science Fiction and Fact (with no indication of its fictional or factual status) and included in his anthology All One Universe (1996). It is designed to illustrate what English might look like without its large number of words derived from languages such as French, Greek, and Latin, especially with regard to the proportion of scientific words with origins in those languages.

Written as a demonstration of linguistic purism in English, the work explains atomic theory using Germanic words almost exclusively and coining new words when necessary; many of these new words have cognates in modern German, an important scientific language in its own right. The title phrase uncleftish beholding calques "atomic theory".

To illustrate, the text begins:

For most of its being, mankind did not know what things are made of, but could only guess. With the growth of worldken, we began to learn, and today we have a beholding of stuff and work that watching bears out, both in the workstead and in daily life.

It goes on to define firststuffs (chemical elements), such as waterstuff (hydrogen), sourstuff (oxygen), and ymirstuff (uranium), as well as bulkbits (molecules), bindings (compounds), and several other terms important to uncleftish worldken (atomic science). Wasserstoff and Sauerstoff are the modern German words for hydrogen and oxygen, and in Dutch the modern equivalents are waterstof and zuurstof. Sunstuff refers to helium, which derives from ἥλιος, the Ancient Greek word for 'sun'. Ymirstuff references Ymir, a giant in Norse mythology similar to Uranus in Greek mythology.

== Glossary ==
Comparison of terms in "Uncleftish Beholding" and English
Term in "Uncleftish Beholding"	Term in English	Origin in English
uncleft	atom	from Greek ἄτομος átomos 'uncut, unhewn; indivisible', from ἀ- a- 'not' + τομος tomos 'a cutting'
uncleftish	atomic	as above
beholding	theory	from Greek θεωρία theōria 'contemplation, speculation; a looking at, viewing; a sight, show, spectacle, things looked at', from θεωρεῖν theōrein 'to consider, speculate, look at', from θεωρός theōrós 'spectator'.
worldken	science	from Latin scientia 'knowledge'. World + ken means "knowledge of the world".
minglingken, mingler	chemistry, chemist	via Arabic, of uncertain origin, possibly Greek χυμείᾱ khumeíā 'metallurgy', lit. 'pouring' (i.e. 'art of casting/mixing metals')
stuff, firststuff	matter, element	from Latin materia 'substance from which something is made'; from Latin elementum 'rudiment, first principle, matter in its most basic form'
workstead	laboratory	from Latin laboratorium 'place for work'
forward bernstonish lading	positive electric charge	from Greek ḗlektron 'amber', in German Bernstein ('burn-stone', borrowed from Low German); from Late Latin carricare 'to load a wagon or cart'
backward bernstonish lading	negative electric charge	from Greek ḗlektron 'amber', in German Bernstein ('burn-stone', borrowed from Low German); from Late Latin carricare 'to load a wagon or cart'
forwardladen	positively charged	
backwardladen	negatively charged	
waterstuff	hydrogen	from Greek ῠ̔δρο- hŭdro- 'water' + -γενής -genḗs, suffix meaning 'born in a certain condition or place'. Its cognate in German is Wasserstoff and in Swedish väte.
sunstuff	helium	from Greek ἥλιος hḗlios 'sun'
stonestuff	lithium	from Greek λίθος líthos 'stone'
coalstuff	carbon	from Latin for 'coal'. Its cognate in German is Kohlenstoff.
chokestuff	nitrogen	Name from niter, from the Ancient Greek νιτρων nitron, from Ancient Egyptian netjeri, related to the Hebrew néter, for salt-derived ashes (their interrelationship is not clear). Chokestuff is inspired by chokedamp, a term for oxygen-poor air found in mines and other confined spaces. Chokedamp is composed mostly of nitrogen. The cognate in German is Stickstoff and in Swedish kväve, both bearing the meaning 'choke'.
sourstuff	oxygen	from Greek for 'sharp' or 'sour'. Its German cognate is Sauerstoff and Swedish syre. It was originally thought to be responsible for the formation of acids (German Säure), which taste sour.
glasswortstuff	sodium	Glasswort was used as a source of soda for glassmaking.
flintstuff	silicon	from Latin for 'flint'
potashstuff	potassium	Latinised form of potash
ymirstuff	uranium	from the god Uranus (Norse equivalent is Ymir)
aegirstuff	neptunium	from the god Neptune (Norse equivalent is Ægir)
helstuff	plutonium	from the god Pluto (Norse equivalent is Hel)
roundaround board of the firststuffs	periodic table of the elements	from Latin periodus ('complete sentence, period, circuit'), from Ancient Greek períodos ('cycle, period of time')
lightrotting	radioactive decay	from Latin radius 'ray'; from Norman French decaeir 'to fall away, decay, decline'
firstbit	proton	from Greek, neuter of πρῶτος prôtos 'first'
neitherbit, weeneitherbit	neutron, neutrino	from Latin neuter 'neither' and its diminutive
forwardbit	positron	portmanteau of 'positive' + 'electron'
lightbit	photon	Greek φωτο- phōto-, the combining form of φῶς phôs 'light', + '-on' by analogy with other particles
lump	quantum, particle	Latin quantum 'how much'
farer	ion	from Greek neuter present participle of ienai, meaning 'to go'
samestead	isotope	Greek roots isos (ἴσος 'equal') and topos (τόπος "place"), meaning 'the same place'
splitly	fissile	Latin fissilis 'able to be split'

The vocabulary used in "Uncleftish Beholding" does not completely derive from Anglo-Saxon. Around, from Old French reond (Modern French rond), completely displaced Old English ymbe (modern English umbe, now obsolete, cognate to German um and Latin ambi-) and left no "native" English word for this concept. The text also contains the French-derived words rest, ordinary and sort.

The text gained increased exposure and popularity after being circulated around the Internet, and has served as inspiration for some inventors of Germanic English conlangs. Douglas Hofstadter, in discussing the piece in his book Le Ton beau de Marot, jocularly refers to the use of only Germanic roots for scientific pieces as "Ander-Saxon".

== See also ==
- Anglish
- Thing Explainer
