= Grand Shaftesbury Run =

- Date: early summer (annually)
- Location: Shaftesbury Estate; Dorset, England
- Event type: off-road (cross country)
- Distance: 21.1 kilometres (13.1 mi) (half marathon); 10 kilometres (6.2 mi) (quarter marathon)
- Established: 12 June 2011
- Website: Official website

The Grand Shaftesbury Run, previously known as the Great Shaftesbury Run, is an off-road, rural half marathon and 10k course that takes place on the 2,200 hectares (5,400 acres) historic Shaftesbury Estate in Wimborne St Giles, Dorset, England. Both courses start and finish in the park at St Giles House, the historic home of the Earls of Shaftesbury. The inaugural event, held on 12 June 2011, opened the family estate to the public for the first time in 60 years.

The run is a charity fundraiser established by the 12th Earl of Shaftesbury. The estate additionally provides opportunities for families and friends throughout St Giles Park. The inaugural event took place in the pouring rain. Almost 500 people participated with half of the entrants running the half-marathon, while the other half ran the entire 10k. The second annual run is scheduled for 27 May 2012.

== Background ==
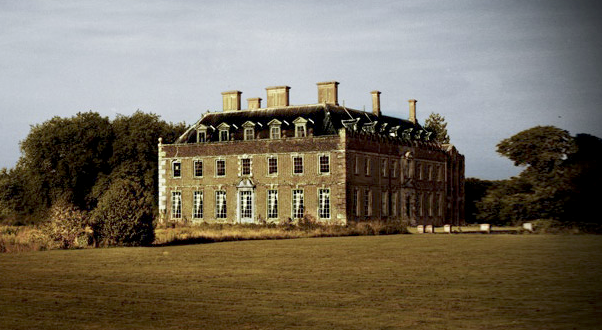
St Giles House from where the Grand Shaftesbury Run begins and ends.

In December 2009, Nicholas Ashley-Cooper, 12th Earl of Shaftesbury, suffered serious spinal injuries in a riding accident, crushing several vertebrae in the fall. He was initially airlifted to hospital in Dorchester, but transferred to Southampton, where he had a metal plate and screws inserted, and then to the Salisbury District Hospital, where he spent Christmas and New Year. While he experienced initial paralysis necessitating the use of a wheelchair, physical therapy helped restore his health to the point where he has been able to regain his strength and participate in competitive and recreational runs on a regular basis.

When asked why he started the Grand Shaftesbury Run, Lord Shaftesbury stated,

I am a passionate runner and I wanted to create an event that would bring people together and also bring awareness to the causes I am involved in. We are embarking on a big restoration project at home and so it felt like the right time to open the doors to the estate and let people in.

—Nicholas Ashley-Cooper, 12th Earl of Shaftesbury

The Grand Shaftesbury Run was initially known as the Great Shaftesbury Run. In January 2012, the name was changed in response to a request from the organizers of the Great North Run, who shared that they had trademarked the phrase "Great ... Run". Rather than alienate their friends or step on toes, Lord Shaftesbury honored the request and changed the name, stating he is "looking forward to becoming the Grandest Run out there".

Opportunities for families and friends not participating in the run are available throughout St Giles Park. The estate provides food, music, and games for children and adults, along with plenty of spots to sit and enjoy the surroundings in front of St Giles House. There are also several vantage points from which to watch the race, either in the park itself, along the lanes in Wimborne St Giles, or at one of the designated water points along the course.

== Course structure ==
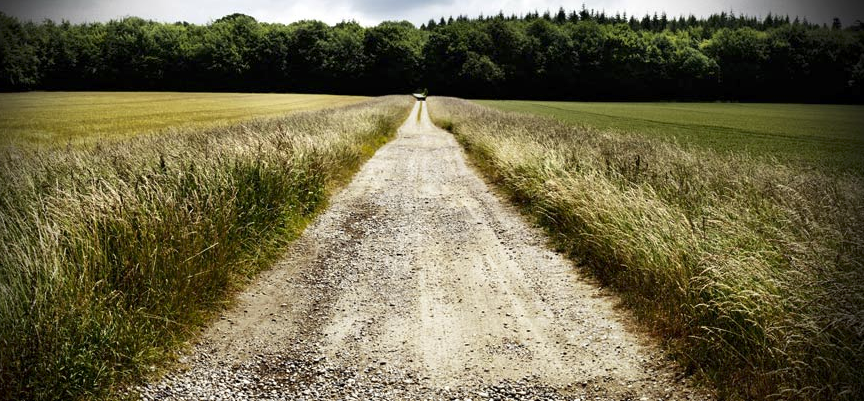
Running path on the Shaftesbury Estates, used during the Grand Shaftesbury Run.

The Grand Shaftesbury Run is divided into two courses, which include a half marathon and a 10k race. Each course takes the runners through the estate property, following trails through the Cranborne Chase and West Wiltshire Downs. The Shaftesbury Estate is part of a designated Area of Outstanding Natural Beauty.

=== Half marathon ===
The half marathon follows 18th and 19th century horse and carriage trails that run through the estate's beech tree plantation. The run encircles the entire estate, offering participants an opportunity to experience private woodlands and forests. The running trail ends as participants head back to the estate park, running alongside some of the key features of the estate, including the serpentine lake, the garden grotto, and finally arriving at the beech grove down the avenue in front of St Giles House to the finish line and a crowd of family, friends, and community onlookers.

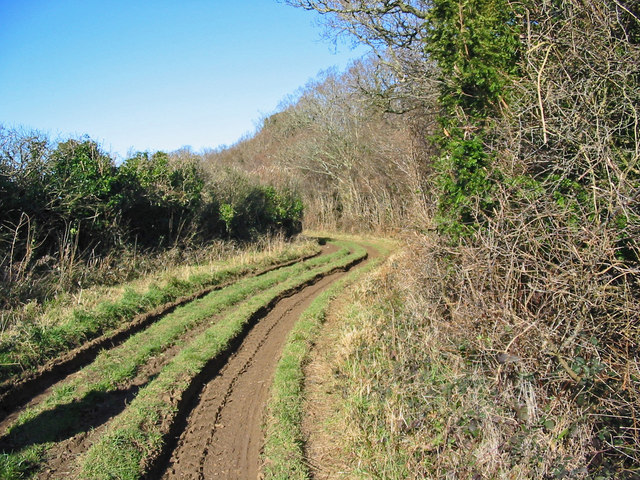
Bridleway track along Harley Down.

=== 10k course ===
The 10k course leads runners out of the park by the cricket pitch and joins up with the half marathon course along the beech belt before turning back through the fields. Participants then run past Manor Farm and up on to Harley Down. The trail then follows the lanes through Wimborne St Giles before entering the park via the main entrance and on to the finish line in front of St Giles House. The Run takes runners through the historic estate's woodlands, green leafy forest, around fields, and along the bridleway tracks. The course follows a circular route that presents tests and challenges in the terrain from start to finish.

== Charitable recipients ==
The 2011 run supported three official event charities. These included Wings for Life, a spinal cord research charity; The Philip Green Memorial School, which is a major beneficiary of the Philip Green Memorial Trust; and the Victoria Education Centre and Sports College Sparkle Appeal. These same organisations will be financial recipients of the charitable run in 2012.

The official fundraising partner for the event is Bmycharity, which is subsidiary of Help for Heroes. The service offers charities the opportunity to recruit fundraisers and collect sponsorship through a coordinated online presence, without charging a commission on donations made through their website. While the run officials encourage participants to raise funds for one of the official charities, individuals are welcome to raise for whomever they choose.
