= St Giles House, Wimborne St Giles =

Coordinates: 50.9038°N 1.9555°W

St Giles House
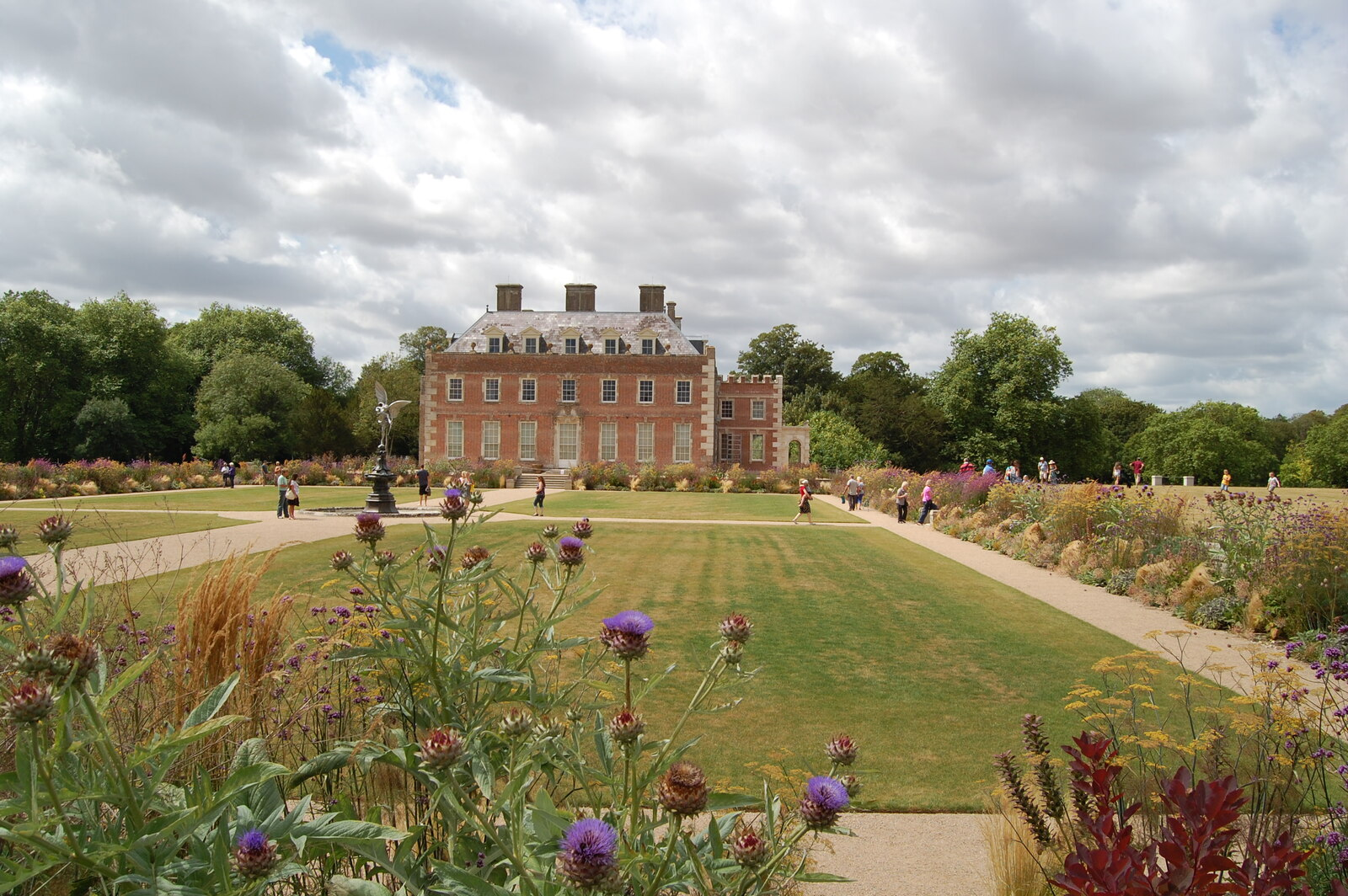
- Home of the Earls of Shaftesbury since 1651
- Former names: Ashley House

General information
- Type: Residence
- Architectural style: Renaissance
- Location: The Estate Office; Wimborne, Dorset; BH21 5NA, Wimborne St Giles, England
- Current tenants: Estate offices Ashley-Cooper family
- Construction started: 1651
- Owner: The 12th Earl of Shaftesbury

Design and construction
- Architect: style influenced by Inigo Jones
- Other designers: Henry Flitcroft (interiors)

Website
- Official website

St Giles House is located at Wimborne St Giles in Dorset in England, just south of Cranborne Chase. It is the ancestral seat of the Ashley-Cooper family, which is headed by the Earl of Shaftesbury. The estate covers over 5,500 acres (22 km^{2}).

Built in 1651, the Grade I listed house stands in a vast park through which the River Allen flows, feeding a seven-acre lake as it winds its way towards the small parish village of Wimborne St Giles. The 17th-century house is a low, quadrangular building. Although the name of the architect is not known, the influence of Inigo Jones is obvious in the Renaissance north and east fronts with their Classical façades. The original plan of the house called for a square courtyard, to which was added two large ground floor rooms, with additional rooms on the second and third floors. The house was once completely crenellated along the edge of the parapet (or shorter walls), however most of these fortifications were removed in the 19th century. The east front, with its seven bays, remains much the same today.

The surrounding estate park of 400 acres features a serpentine lake, garden ornaments, a notable grotto and a 1000-yard avenue of beech. The park is Grade II* listed in the National Register of Historic Parks and Gardens.

== Ashley family ==
The Ashley family were originally from Wiltshire, where they had owned the manor of Ashley since the 11th century. The first ancestor to reside in Wimborne St Giles was Robert Ashley (born c. 1415); he was the fifth great-grandfather of Anthony Ashley-Cooper, 1st Earl of Shaftesbury.

Robert Ashley acquired a large family manor in Wimborne St Giles through his marriage to Egidia Hamelyn, daughter of Sir John Hamelyn. Ashley and his two immediate successors, Edmund Ashley (born c. 1440), and Hugh Ashley (born c. 1465) flourished under King Henry IV. When Hugh Ashley died 29 April 1493, his estates transferred to his eldest son, Sir Henry Ashley I.

- Sir Henry Ashley I was married to Radegan Gilbert, daughter of Robert Gilbert of Somerset. Together, they had two sons, Henry II (his heir) and Anthony of Damerham. When Sir Henry Ashley I died on 1 March 1549, his son Henry II inherited the estate at Wimborne St Giles.
- Sir Henry Ashley II was married to Catherine Bassett, sister of Anne Bassett, both daughters of Sir John Bassett and Honor Grenville, Viscountess Lisle. Sir Henry II was knighted at the coronation of Queen Mary and appointed ranger of Alice Holt Forest. He was succeeded by his son, Henry Ashley III, who was gentleman pensioner to Queen Elizabeth.
- Sir Henry Ashley III was married to Anne Burgh, daughter of Lord Thomas Burgh, 1st Baron Burgh. Sir Henry and Anne had three sons and four daughter - MP for Wareham, 1572, Christchurch, 1586 and Poole, 1589. He was Vice-Admiral of Dorset, 1588, commanded HMS Scout at the time of the Armada, and also concerned himself with land defenses against invasion. Gentleman Pensioner to Queen Elizabeth by 1586; knighted, 1603. Between 1589 and 1595 Ashley was involved in a series of disputes and prosecutions before the Privy Council and the Star Chamber over accusations of extortion, libel, a forged warrant and an affray on the streets of Salisbury, most probably driven by his urgent need for funds, as in 1589 it was claimed that his estates were indebted to the tune of £8,000. In the 1590s he obtained permission to travel to Ireland, where his brother-in-law, Lord Burgh, who was Lord Deputy, obtained for him the keepership of a castle near Waterford, but he was later relieved of the command by the Privy Council. In 1602 he again visited Ireland, taking a hundred Dorset men with him, perhaps with the intention of settling in Munster, but he was again recalled by the Privy Council. but this did not fully resolve his financial embarrassments,
- By 1596 he was actively trying to sell the Wimborne St. Giles estate, which he eventually he entailed the Estate to his cousin, Sir Anthony Ashley of Wimborne St Giles. As His Son's passed away with no Male Heir's and His one daughter Ann
- He died about 1605; as he had no lands no inquisition post mortem was held, but many years later administration of his goods was granted to his son, 7 November 1622

=== Sir Anthony Ashley, 1st Baronet of Wimborne St Giles ===
Anthony Ashley, born in 1551, was the son of Sir Anthony Ashley of Damerham and Dorothy Lyte of Lytes Cary in Somerset. Sir Anthony Ashley inherited the family estates at Wimborne St Giles on his cousin Sir Henry III's death. At this time, he became a generous benefactor of the parish. He rebuilt the parish church, and built and endowed alms houses for the relief of 11 senior citizens.

Ashley was married twice. His first wife was Jane Okeover, daughter of Philip Okeover of Okeover Hall. She was the widow of Sir Thomas Cokayne of Ashbourne and High Sheriff of Derbyshire. Sir Anthony Ashley and Jane were married about 1592 and had a daughter, Anne Elizabeth Ashley, who was born in 1593. In 1622, two years after Jane died from smallpox, Ashley married 19-year-old Philippa Sheldon. She was the sister of Elizabeth Sheldon, who was married to Christopher (Kit) Villiers, 1st Earl of Anglesey, brother of George Villiers, 1st Duke of Buckingham. Through this marriage, Ashley cemented a political alliance with the most powerful man at court. On 3 July 1622, Ashley was created baronet of Wimborne St Giles.

Ashley took great interest in shaping the future of his grandchild, Anthony Ashley Cooper, 1st Earl of Shaftesbury, born to inherit the ancient possessions of his estate. He lived long enough to choose his grandson's first tutor, insisting that a man with Puritan leanings tutor his grandchildren. At his insistence, Dr Aaron Guerdon was chosen as the children's tutor.

After Ashley died at the age of 76, on 13 January 1628, his wife Philippa went on to marry Carew Raleigh, son of Sir Walter Raleigh, while his daughter, Anne Ashley who married Sir John Cooper of Rockbourne, inherited the family estates at Wimborne St Giles.

== Cooper family ==
In 1620, the Ashley-Cooper dynasty was established when Sir John Cooper of Rockbourne (1598–1631) married Anne Elizabeth Ashley (1593–1628), the daughter of Sir Anthony Ashley of Wimborne St Giles. The extensive estates that both inherited, consolidated the holdings of the Ashley and Cooper families in Hampshire, Wiltshire, Dorset, and Somerset. The vast properties, lands, and holdings effectively solidified the Ashley-Coopers as one of the wealthiest families in England.

=== Sir John Cooper, 1st Baronet of Rockbourne ===
Sir John Cooper was created 1st Baronet of Rockbourne on 4 July 1622, the day after Sir Anthony Ashley was created 1st Baronet of Wimborne St Giles. He sat in the House of Commons as a Member of Parliament for Poole, in the first and third parliaments of King Charles I, 1625 and 1628. He was the son of Sir John Cooper Sr (1552–1610) and Margaret Skutt.

As a condition of Sir John's marriage to Anne, Sir Anthony Ashley required that John Cooper's heir use the surname of Ashley-Cooper. Furthermore, he required that if an Ashley-Cooper male ever achieved nobility, the title should carry the name of Ashley. In turn, by her marriage to John, Anne Ashley transferred the legal right of ownership of the Ashley estate at Wimborne St Giles to her husband, John Cooper. This agreement was made prior to 1622, when John Cooper, himself, was created a Baronet. John and Anne's first son and heir was born on 22 July 1621 at his grandfather's home at Wimborne St Giles. Accordingly, oldest son and heir of John Cooper, was christened Anthony Ashley-Cooper at birth. All his younger siblings remained Coopers.

In later years, the 4th Earl of Shaftesbury preserved a note in the family papers, stating that Sir Anthony Ashley-Cooper was unaware of the marriage agreement established between his father and grandfather, when he chose the title of Baron Ashley after the Restoration. He was very happy when he found out about the marriage and property agreement and amazed that he had unwittingly complied with this provision regardless of the lack of prior knowledge.

Six months later, on 20 July 1628, Anne died of smallpox, leaving her husband with three children. Their two sons were Anthony Ashley and George Cooper. Their daughter, Philippa, was two years younger than Anthony, while George was two years younger than his sister. As George grew into adulthood, he relocated to Clarendon Park and Farley, Wiltshire. Philippa became the wife of Sir Adam Browne, 2nd Baronet of Betchworth. Anthony inherited the titles of his grandfather, father, and father-in-law, as well as St Giles House and the vast holdings of the Shaftesbury Estate.

== Anthony Ashley-Cooper ==
Anthony Ashley-Cooper's parents both died before he reached the age of ten years. At their death, Anthony inherited extensive estates, after consolidating the holdings of both the Ashley and Cooper families in Hampshire, Wiltshire, Dorset and Somerset. The vast properties, lands, and holdings effectively solidified the Ashley-Cooper family as one of the wealthiest in England. The family also owns Lough Neagh, the largest lake in the British Isles.

After the death of his parents, Ashley-Cooper and his siblings lived with Sir Daniel Norton, one of his Trustees, at Southwick, who was also a trusted friend of King Charles I. When Sir Daniel Norton died in 1635, the siblings went to live with their uncle, Edward Tooker of New Sarum (now Salisbury). Edward Tooker was the husband of the children's aunt, Martha Cooper, and another Trustee of Sir John Cooper's estate. Much of Ashley-Cooper's inheritance was squandered owing to the incompetence of the men entrusted with responsibility for guarding his interests. In the end, the uncertainties of Ashley-Cooper's childhood shaped the man. He grew into one of the most influential statesmen of the late 17th century.

Ashley-Cooper was married three times. His first wife was Margaret, daughter of Lord Thomas Coventry. On 27 July 1646, she miscarried a son when her brother, John, jokingly threw her against a bed. She had been pregnant 20 weeks at the time of miscarriage. To the great sorrow of both parents, she miscarried a second pregnancy on 29 March 1647. She was 11 weeks along in the pregnancy. The following year, in November, she gave birth to a stillborn son, just two weeks short of the scheduled delivery date. On 10 July 1649, six weeks short of delivery her fourth child, she complained of a headache and had seizure. Unable to speak, she went to bed and died the next morning. Married just under ten years, she had been pregnant four times, yet not one child was born alive.

On 25 April 1650, nine months after the death of his first wife, Shaftesbury married Lady Frances Cecil, daughter of the royalist, David Cecil, 3rd Earl of Exeter. A few days before this marriage, Shaftesbury entered in his diary: "I laid the first stone of my house at St Giles's." In 1651, Countess Shaftesbury bore a son, who was christened Cecil. However, the young Cecil Ashley-Cooper died during childhood. The following year, on 16 January 1652, she gave birth to Shaftesbury's son and namesake, Anthony Ashley-Cooper. Through his marriage to the former Frances Cecil, Shaftesbury acquired property at Exeter House, also known as Cecil House in London. It was here that the philosopher, John Locke resided from 1666 to 1688, while serving as Shaftesbury's personal physician, secretary, researcher, political operative, and friend. While living with him, Locke became drawn into the heart of English politics in the 1670s and 1680s.

Shaftesbury's third wife was Margaret, daughter of William Spencer, 2nd Baron Spencer of Wormleighton. Margaret's mother was Penelope, first daughter of Henry Wriothesley, 3rd Earl of Southampton. Margaret, Countess of Shaftesbury, was the mother of Ashley-Cooper's two daughters, Penelope and Lucretia. While Burke's Peerage states that Ashley-Cooper had only one child, son and heir Anthony Jr, Ashley-Cooper's published papers and biographies state that he had several daughters. It is also documented that he had at least one illegitimate son, Charles, born during his first marriage.

=== Ascent to power ===
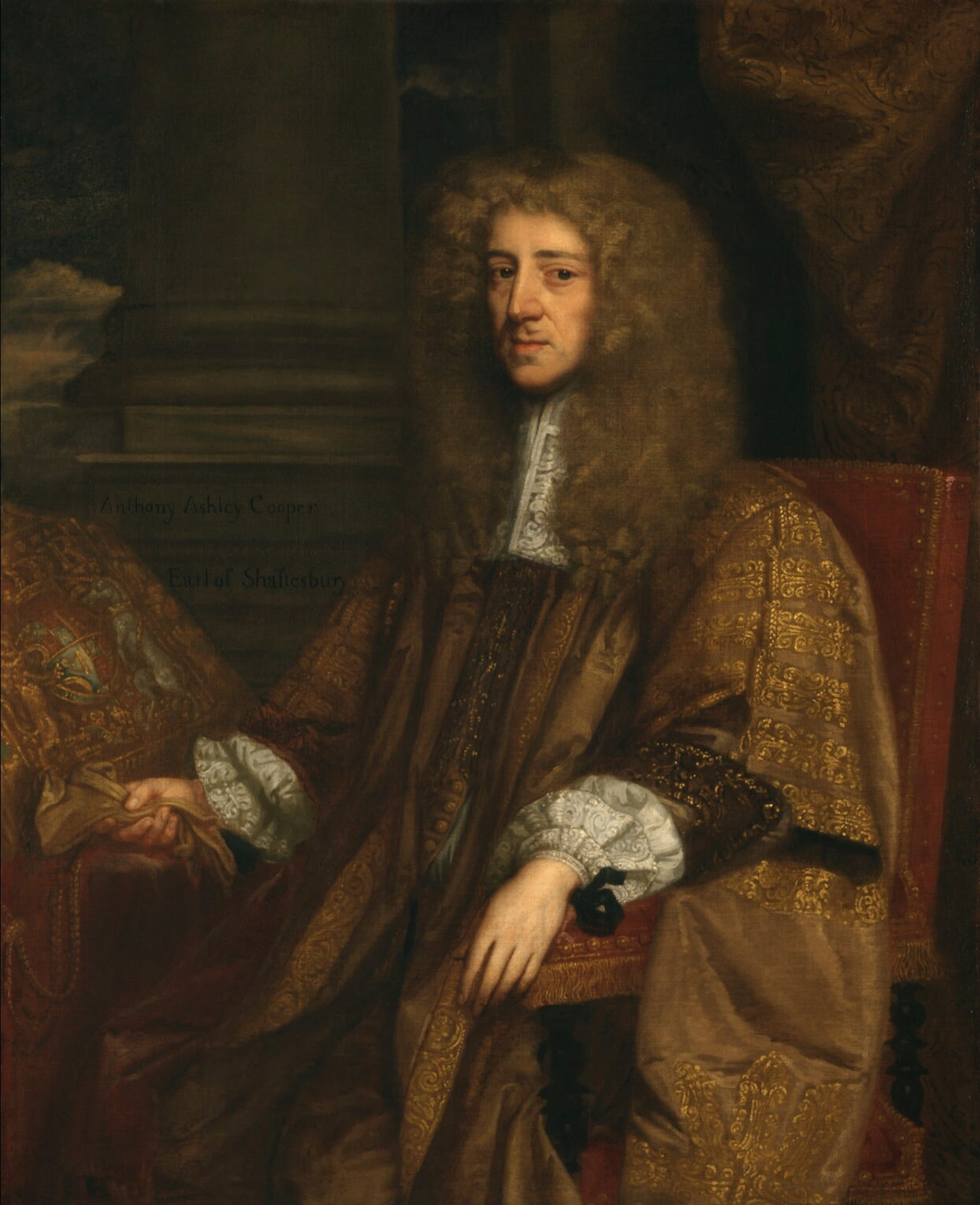
1st Earl of Shaftesbury, ca. 1672-73

In 1661, Anthony Ashley-Cooper was raised to peerage as Baron Cooper of Pawlett and Baron Ashley of Wimborne St Giles. His father previously held the title of Baronet Cooper of Pawlett. In 1672, Anthony Ashley-Cooper was also named the 1st Earl of Shaftesbury. Prior to 1661, he was referred to as Sir Anthony Ashley-Cooper. After 1661, he was commonly referred to as Lord Ashley. Finally, from 1672 until his death in 1683, he was referred to as Lord Shaftesbury or just "Shaftesbury."

Anthony Ashley-Cooper, Earl of Shaftesbury was a prominent English politician during the time of Oliver Cromwell between the reigns of King Charles I and King Charles II. He was a pronounced liberal and very much opposed to religious intolerance and persecution. The Fundamental Constitutions of Carolina, the laws for the new province, were the work of Shaftesbury's friend and secretary, the philosopher John Locke, but they contain evidences of Shaftesbury's collaboration, too. The laws he helped to write produced the greatest measure of political and religious freedom in British North America (and, indeed, in much of the world). He was the author of the Habeas Corpus Act whereby an accused man cannot be held indefinitely in prison without trial, an English law that passed into that of the United States.

In 1672, Lord Ashley was appointed by King Charles II to the position of Lord Chancellor of England, which is one of the most senior and important functions in the government of the United Kingdom. The Lord Chancellor's responsibilities are wide-ranging: they include presiding over the House of Lords, participating in the Cabinet, acting as the custodian of the Great Seal, and heading the judiciary. His appointment lasted for two years.

In American history, Sir Anthony Ashley-Cooper is probably best known as one of the Lords Proprietors of the Carolina colonies. Shaftesbury not only had his holdings in Carolina, but he had been part owner of a sugar plantation on Barbados, and a shareholder in the Hudson's Bay Company.

As Charles II grew more absolute in his rule, and as Protestantism faced extinction in England if Charles' Catholic brother, James II, should succeed him, Shaftesbury opposed the growing political and religious absolutism he saw approaching, fell out of Charles' favor, was exiled to Holland and died there on 21 January 1683.

== Succession of owners of St Giles House ==
Anthony Ashley-Cooper, 1st Earl of Shaftesbury was succeeded by his son and namesake, Anthony Ashley-Cooper, 2nd Earl of Shaftesbury. He inherited St Giles House and the Shaftesbury Estate and holdings. He also succeeded to the peerage, inheriting the title of 2nd Earl of Shaftesbury. He represented Melcombe Regis and Weymouth in the House of Commons. His son, Anthony Ashley-Cooper, succeeded as the 3rd Earl of Shaftesbury upon his death.

The 3rd Earl sat as a Member of Parliament but is chiefly remembered as a writer and philosopher. On his death, the titles passed to his son, Anthony Ashley-Cooper, who became the 4th Earl of Shaftesbury. The 4th Earl notably served as Lord Lieutenant of Dorset and Councillor of the Colony of Georgia. He died in 1711, at which time, his son inherited the title of 5th Earl.

Anthony Ashley-Cooper, 5th Earl of Shaftesbury was educated at Winchester and served as Deputy Lieutenant of Dorset. Cropley Ashley-Cooper, younger brother of the 5th Earl, inherited the title of 6th Earl upon the death of his older brother in 1811. The 6th Earl, represented Dorchester in Parliament. He served as member of the Privy Council and Deputy Speaker of the House of Lords. Upon his death, the title was passed to his son.

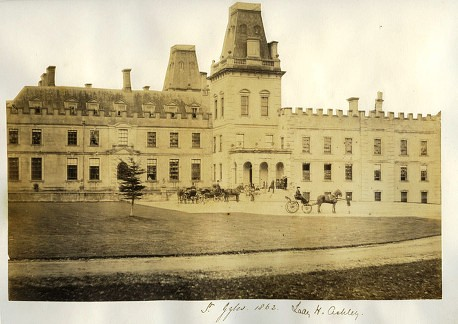
St Giles House, 1862

The 7th Earl was a prominent politician, social reformer and philanthropist. He was known as the reforming Lord Shaftesbury in the 19th century, who fought for the abolition of slavery. His eldest son, the 8th Earl, sat as Member of Parliament for Kingston upon Hull and Cricklade. He was succeeded by his son, the 9th Earl, who was the Lord Mayor of Belfast, Lord Lieutenant of Belfast, County Antrim and Dorset and Lord Steward of the Household. On his death, the titles passed to his grandson, the 10th Earl, the son of Major Lord Ashley.

In 2004, Anthony Ashley-Cooper, 10th Earl of Shaftesbury, was murdered by his wife and brother-in-law. They were convicted of the crime in 2007, two years after the 10th Earl's body was found dismembered in the French Alps. His eldest son, Anthony Ashley-Cooper, 11th Earl of Shaftesbury, inherited the titles and estate but died soon afterwards in May 2005 of a heart attack at the age of 27. The inheritance consequently transferred to his younger brother Nicholas Ashley-Cooper, 12th Earl of Shaftesbury, who was then living in New York. He returned to England to manage the estate.

== Recent history ==
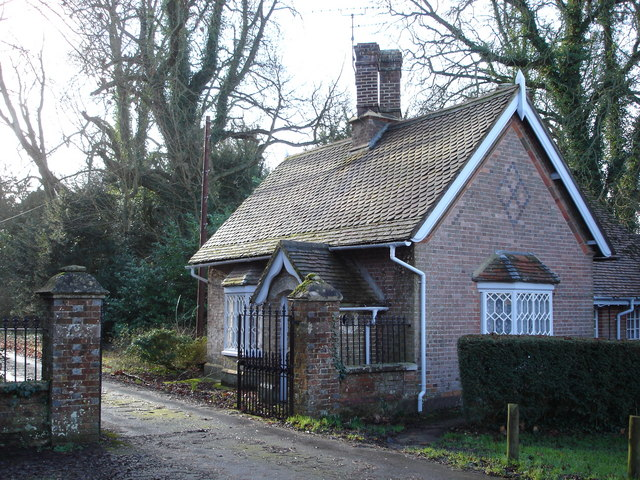
Gatehouse to St Giles House

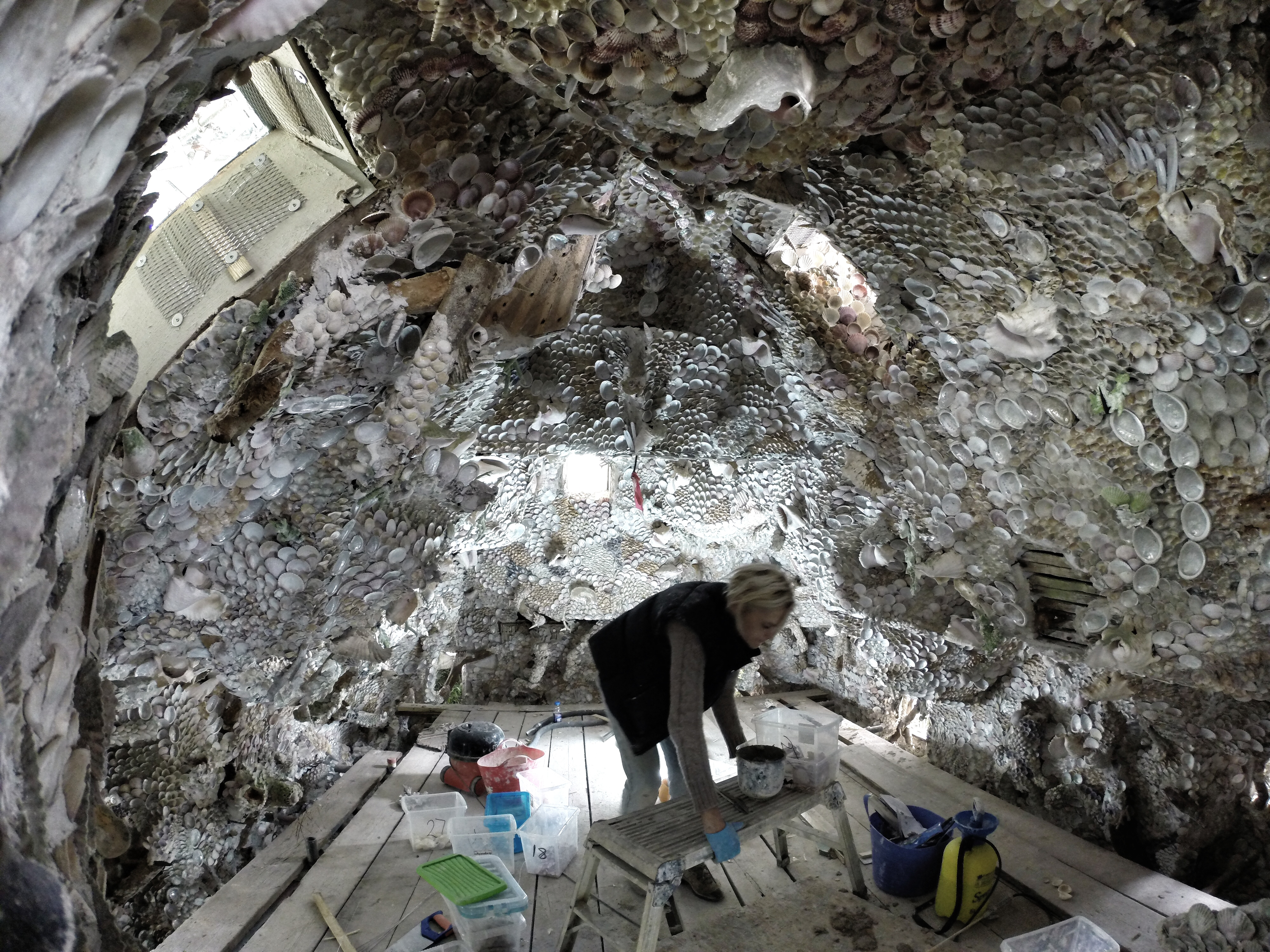
Conservation on the shell grotto in July 2014

During the First World War, part of St Giles House was used as a hospital, and in the Second World War, it was requisitioned and used as a school, the 9th Earl and family moving to an apartment within the house. In 1954 the burden of running the house became too great and the family retreated to the dower house, known as Mainsail Haul. This manor house is located near the centre of Wimborne St Giles. St Giles was largely unoccupied apart from one wing used as the estate office. With the intention of returning St Giles to its original design, in 1973 the 10th Earl demolished the southwest wing and the kitchen wing, as well as the Victorian tower. A joinery business was operated from the basement – during the 10th Earl's tenure, the estate woodlands were restored and a million trees were planted.

However, by 2001 St Giles House was recorded on the Register of Buildings at Risk, indicating its neglect and decay.

Between 2003 and 2017, a long term interdisciplinary study was undertaken on the fabric of St Giles House and its estate. This involved documentary research and investigation, the findings from which has informed the ongoing restoration work.

Following his inheritance of the estate in 2005, the 12th Earl embarked on an ambitious restoration of the House and park. His achievement was recognised in 2015, when St Giles won the Historic Houses Association and Sotheby’s Restoration Award for that year. The family have returned to live in St Giles, residing in an apartment in one wing.

Since 2023 the music festival We Out Here has been held on the estate.

Garden grotto and estate park

The garden grotto, c. 1751–53 and the estate park itself are both recorded on the Register as a Grade II* listed buildings. The Grade II* list records buildings (and parks and gardens) that are "particularly important [with] more than special interest". Built of flint and rubble with a tiled and slated roof, the grotto is positioned so that the structure appears to be the source of a spring feeding the ornamental lake. The ante-chamber is lined with flints, fossils and minerals, and the main chamber has walls lined with shells, fossils, coral and stone. Some of the shells were sent from the Caribbean by the father of William Thomas Beckford of Fonthill. Rather than just a shell room, the grotto was an attempt to create a room that felt underwater, and is considered a remarkable example of antique surrealism. After falling into decay, it was restored by the 12th Earl.

The Riding House is an early 17th century range set on the southern side of the home farm complex near St Giles House. Investigations by Historic England in 2016 discovered that the building was constructed as a stable block in 1616–18. Historically, the building had been misidentified as a riding house.
