= Earl of Shaftesbury =

Title in the Peerage of England

Earldom of Shaftesbury
- Quarterly: 1st and 4th: Argent, three bulls passant sable, armed and unguled Or (Ashley); 2nd and 3rd: Gules, a bend engrailed between six lions rampant or (Cooper)
- Creation date: 23 April 1672
- Created by: Charles II of England
- Peerage: Peerage of England
- First holder: Anthony Ashley-Cooper
- Present holder: Nicholas Ashley-Cooper, 12th Earl of Shaftesbury
- Heir apparent: Anthony Ashley-Cooper, Lord Ashley
- Remainder to: Heirs male of the body of the 1st earl
- Subsidiary titles: Baron Ashley; Baron Cooper
- Status: Extant
- Seat: St Giles House
- Motto: LOVE, SERVE

Earl of Shaftesbury is a title in the Peerage of England. It was created in 1672 for Anthony Ashley-Cooper, 1st Baron Ashley, a prominent politician in the Cabal then dominating the policies of King Charles II. He had already succeeded his father as second Baronet of Rockbourne in 1631 and been created Baron Ashley, of Wimborne St Giles in the County of Dorset, in 1661, and he was made Baron Cooper, of Paulett in the County of Somerset, at the same time he was given the earldom. The 1st Earl was also a founding officer of the Royal African Company, England's slave-trading monopoly, serving as its sub-governor in 1672–73, and co-authored the Fundamental Constitutions of Carolina, which sought to found a hereditary aristocracy in North America and gave slaveholders "absolute power and authority" over enslaved people.

These titles are also in the Peerage of England. Baron Ashley is used as a courtesy title by the Earl's eldest son and heir apparent. The Cooper baronetcy, of Rockbourne in the County of Southampton, was created in the Baronetage of England in 1622 for the Earl's father, John Cooper. He sat as Member of Parliament for Poole.

The current holder is Nicholas Ashley-Cooper (born 1979).

== History ==
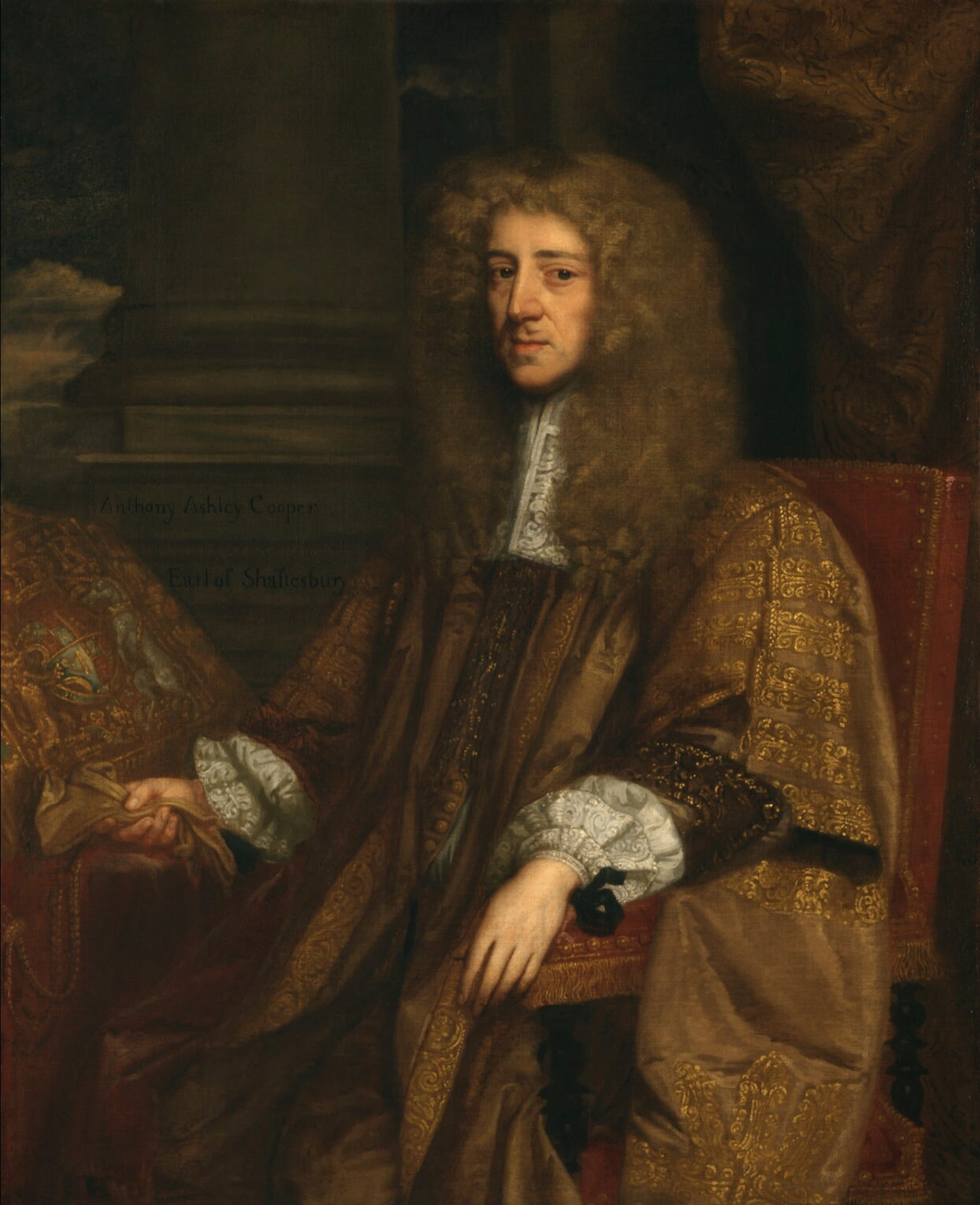
Anthony Ashley-Cooper, 1st Earl of Shaftesbury

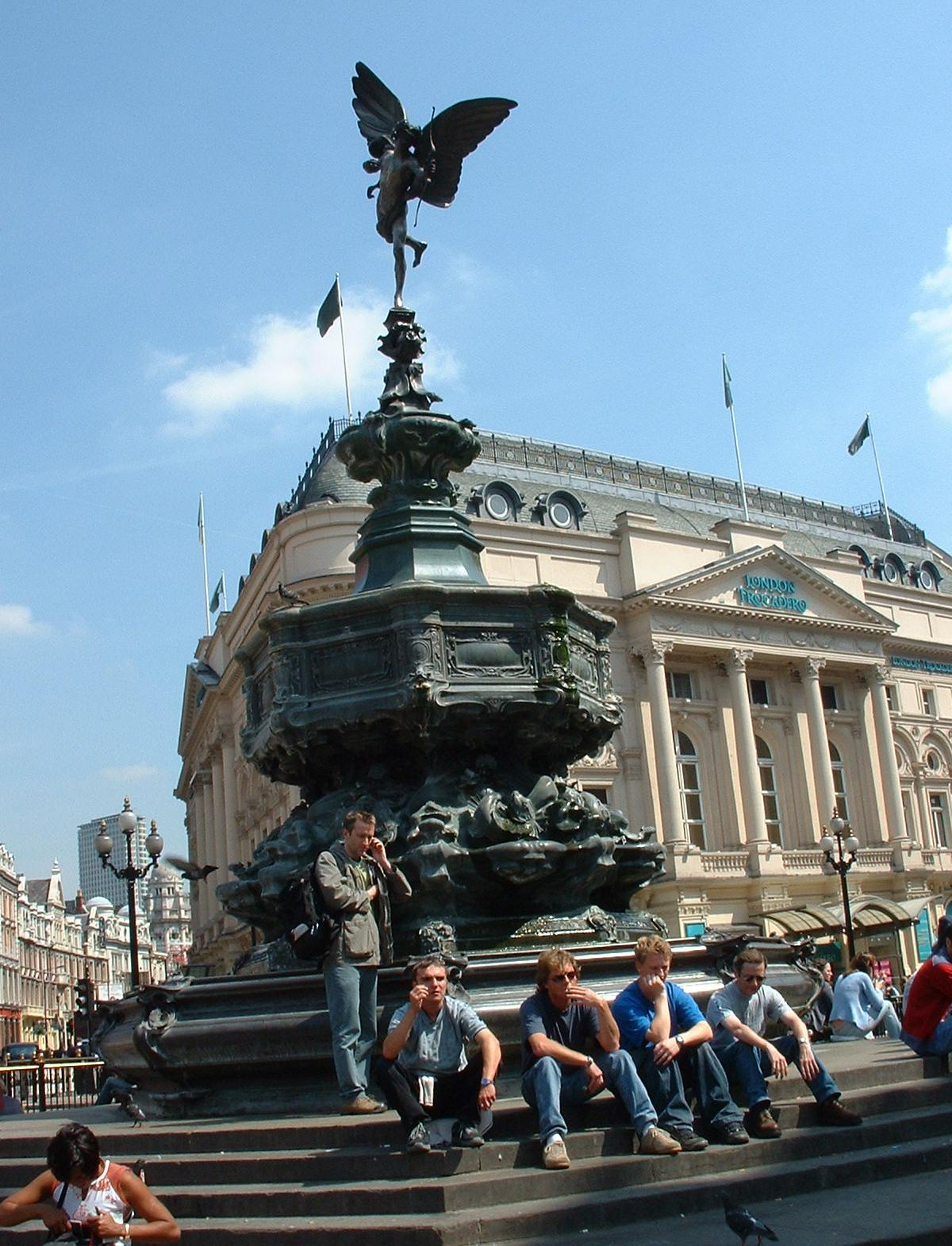
The Shaftesbury Memorial Fountain in Piccadilly Circus and the adjacent Shaftesbury Avenue commemorate the 7th Earl of Shaftesbury, a Victorian politician and social reformer.

The first Earl was succeeded by his son, Anthony Ashley-Cooper, 2nd Earl of Shaftesbury. He represented Melcombe Regis and Weymouth in the House of Commons. His son, Anthony Ashley-Cooper, succeeded as the 3rd Earl upon his death. The 3rd Earl sat as a Member of Parliament, but is chiefly remembered as a writer and philosopher. On his death, the titles passed to his son, Anthony Ashley-Cooper, who became the 4th Earl. The 4th Earl notably served as Lord Lieutenant of Dorset and Councillor of the Colony of Georgia. He died in 1771, at which time, his son inherited the title of 5th Earl.

Anthony Ashley-Cooper, 5th Earl of Shaftesbury, was educated at Winchester and served as Deputy Lieutenant of Dorset. Cropley Ashley-Cooper, younger brother of the 5th Earl, inherited the title of 6th Earl upon the death of his older brother in 1811. The 6th Earl represented Dorchester in Parliament. He served as member of the Privy Council and Deputy Speaker of the House of Lords. Upon his death, the title was passed to his son. The 7th Earl was a prominent politician, social reformer and philanthropist. He was known as the reforming Lord Shaftesbury in the 19th century, who fought for the abolition of slavery. His eldest son, the 8th Earl, sat as Member of Parliament for Kingston upon Hull and Cricklade. He was succeeded by his son, the 9th Earl, who was the Lord Mayor of Belfast, Lord Lieutenant of Belfast, County Antrim and Dorset and Lord Steward of the Household. The 9th Earl was predeceased by his elder son Anthony Ashley-Cooper, Lord Ashley, in 1947; on the 9th Earl's death in 1961, the titles passed to his grandson, the 10th Earl, son of Lord Ashley.

In 2004, Anthony Ashley-Cooper, 10th Earl of Shaftesbury, was murdered by his third wife, Jamila M'Barek, and her brother. They were convicted of the crime in 2007, two years after the 10th Earl's body was found dismembered in the French Alps. The 10th Earl was succeeded by his elder son Anthony Ashley Cooper, 11th Earl of Shaftesbury. In May 2005, six months after succeeding to the earldom, the 11th Earl died of a heart attack in New York City, while visiting his younger brother Nicholas Ashley-Cooper, who succeeded him as 12th Earl.

=== Other family members ===
Other prominent members of the family include Liberal politician Evelyn Ashley, second son of the 7th Earl; his son, noted politician Wilfrid Ashley, 1st Baron Mount Temple, was a member of the Conservative Party, and his daughter Edwina married Louis Mountbatten and was to be last Vicereine of India.

Upon that marriage the Earls of Shaftesbury began close social links to the royal family. Lady Mountbatten was a leading member of London society. Edwina's mother was Amalia Mary Maud Cassel (1879–1911), daughter of the international magnate Sir Ernest Cassel, a friend and private financier to the future King Edward VII and one of the richest men in Europe.

When her grandfather died in 1921, Edwina inherited his vast fortune, which included £2 million, the 5,000-acre (20 km^{2}) country seat of Broadlands, Romsey, Hampshire; Brook House in London; Moulton Paddocks estate in Newmarket, Suffolk; Classiebawn Castle, Mullaghmore, County Sligo, Ireland; and a seaside house at Branksome Dene in Bournemouth. They married on 18 July 1922 at St Margaret's, Westminster. The monarch's immediate family attended; the then-Prince of Wales (the future King Edward VIII) was the best man. The relationship between the families continues, as descendants have often been royal godchildren.

It was at Broadlands that Queen Elizabeth II and her husband, Prince Philip, spent their honeymoon night in 1947. In turn, Prince Charles and his first wife, Lady Diana Spencer, spent their honeymoon night there in 1981.

== St Giles House ==
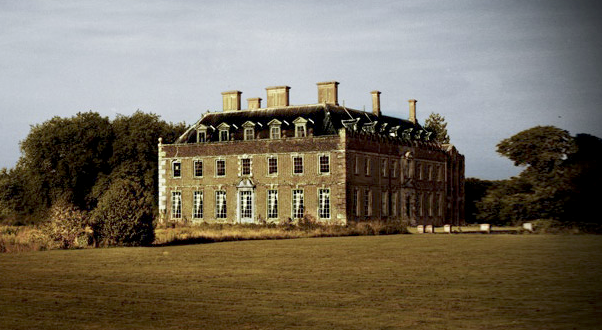
St Giles House, the family seat of the Earls of Shaftesbury

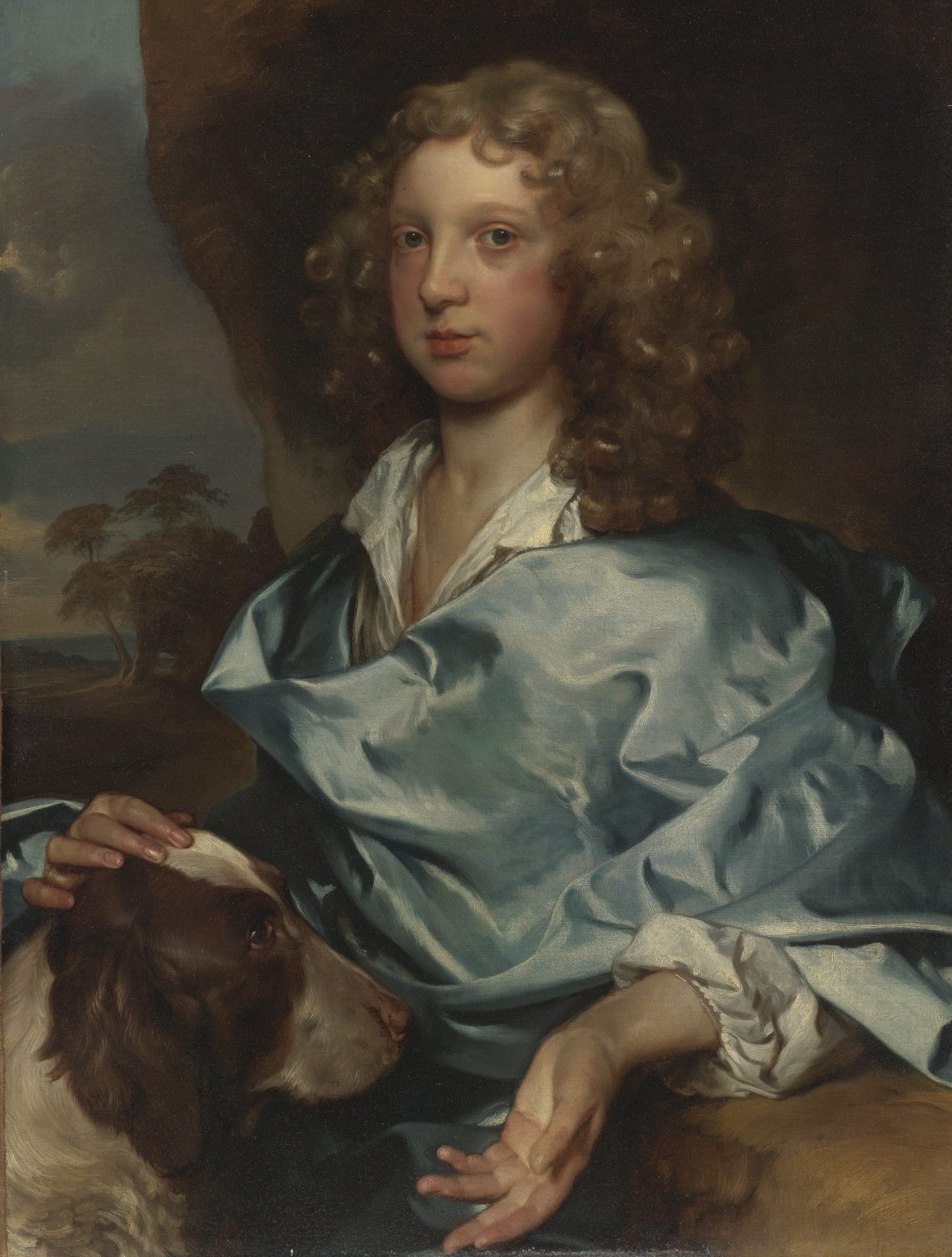
Portrait by Gerard Soest of a member of the Ashley-Cooper family

The family seat is St Giles House (sometimes referred to as Ashley House) near Wimborne St Giles in Dorset. The estate at Wimborne St Giles came into the ownership of the Ashley family around the year 1460, through the marriage of Egidia Hamelyn and Robert Ashley, the 5th great grandfather of the 1st Earl of Shaftesbury.

Early owners of the estate included the Malmayne family. Matilda Malmayne, heiress of the estate, married Edmund Plecy. The Plecy male line became extinct towards the end of the fourteenth century, and the estate was transferred to Edmund and Matilda's descendant Joan Plecy, as heiress. Lady Joan Plecy was soon married to Sir John Hamelyn (d. 1399), but with no male heirs, the estate went to Sir John's daughter Egidia, by his second wife, who married Robert Ashley. The estate has belonged to the Ashleys and Ashley-Coopers ever since.

Construction on St Giles House began in 1651, by Sir Anthony Ashley-Cooper, later to become 1st Earl of Shaftesbury. The manor house is built on top of the ruins of the previous estate home. This large house and surrounding grounds include 400 acres (1.6 km^{2}), along with a seven-acre lake and a 1,000 yards (900 m) avenue of trees. The family also owns Lough Neagh, the largest freshwater lake in the British Isles.

As noted by Christopher Hussey in his article on St Giles' House, "The whole, so little changed in two centuries, is a splendid example of the Kent manner changing into the rococo of the mid-century." However, following World War II, the contents of these rooms have been gradually dispersed in a number of sales. The record of these and a number of published articles indicate that the design of the furniture shows a highly accomplished progression from the architectural Palladian style to the full fanciful rococo style. The accomplished design, together with the high level of craftsmanship, clearly indicate a metropolitan origin for the majority of these pieces, but the surviving Shaftesbury Account Books contain few references to London cabinet-makers other than William Hallett, his name appearing a number of times between 1745 and 1757 with references to 'carved chairs,' 'the Blew Bed,' and 'Mahogany Cisterns.' The payments to other cabinet-makers mentioned in accounts are small in nature and probably indicate their local origins.

The Shaftesburys are known to have had connections with London cabinet makers. The 4th Earl's wife, Lady Susannah Noel, daughter of Baptist Noel, 3rd Earl of Gainsborough, was one of the 26 aristocratic subscribers to the first edition of Thomas Chippendale's Director (1754). His second wife, Lady Mary Bouverie, was the daughter of the 1st Viscount Folkestone who was a major patron of William Hallett and Benjamin Goodison, her brother the 2nd Viscount acquiring pieces from the Royal cabinetmakers William Vile and John Cobb.

== South Carolina ==
The Ashley and Cooper rivers in South Carolina were named for the 1st Earl of Shaftesbury, who was the Chief Lord Proprietor of the Carolina Colony. Charleston was founded on the western bank of the Ashley in 1670 (at Charles Towne Landing), before moving across to its current peninsular location ten years later.

== Cooper baronets, of Rockbourne (1622) ==
- Sir John Cooper, 1st Baronet (died 1631)
- Sir Anthony Ashley-Cooper, 2nd Baronet (1621–1683) (created Baron Ashley in 1661)

=== Barons Ashley (1661) ===
- Sir Anthony Ashley-Cooper, 1st Baron Ashley (1621–1683) (created Earl of Shaftesbury in 1672)

=== Earls of Shaftesbury (1672) ===
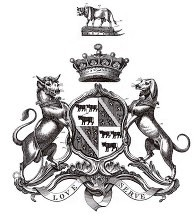
The family's coat of arms

- Anthony Ashley Cooper, 1st Earl of Shaftesbury (1621–1683)
- Anthony Ashley-Cooper, 2nd Earl of Shaftesbury (1652–1699), only adult son of the 1st Earl
- Anthony Ashley-Cooper, 3rd Earl of Shaftesbury (1671–1713), eldest son of the 2nd Earl
- Anthony Ashley Cooper, 4th Earl of Shaftesbury (1711–1771), only child of the 3rd Earl
- Anthony Ashley-Cooper, 5th Earl of Shaftesbury (1761–1811), elder son of the 4th Earl
- Cropley Ashley-Cooper, 6th Earl of Shaftesbury (1768–1851), younger son of the 4th Earl
- Anthony Ashley-Cooper, 7th Earl of Shaftesbury (1801–1885), eldest son of the 6th Earl
- Anthony Ashley-Cooper, 8th Earl of Shaftesbury (1831–1886), eldest son of the 7th Earl
- Anthony Ashley-Cooper, 9th Earl of Shaftesbury (1869–1961), only son of the 8th Earl
  - Anthony Ashley-Cooper, Lord Ashley (1900–1947), elder son of the 9th Earl
- Anthony Ashley-Cooper, 10th Earl of Shaftesbury (1938–2004), only son of Lord Ashley
- Anthony Nils Christian Ashley-Cooper, 11th Earl of Shaftesbury (1977–2005), elder son of the 10th Earl
- Nicholas Edmond Anthony Ashley-Cooper, 12th Earl of Shaftesbury (born 1979), younger son of the 10th Earl

The heir apparent and the only person in line of succession to the titles is the present holder's only son, Anthony Francis Wolfgang Ashley-Cooper, Lord Ashley (born 2011).

=== Male-line family tree ===
Male-line family tree, Cooper baronets (of Rockbourne), Barons Ashley, Barons Cooper and Earls of Shaftesbury.

Sir John Cooper; 1st Baronet died 1631
Baron Ashley; Earl of Shaftesbury
Anthony Ashley Cooper; 1st Earl of Shaftesbury; 2nd Baronet; 1621–1683
Anthony Ashley-Cooper; 2nd Earl of Shaftesbury; 1652–1699
Anthony Ashley-Cooper; 3rd Earl of Shaftesbury; 1671–1713
Anthony Ashley-Cooper; 4th Earl of Shaftesbury; 1711–1771
Anthony Ashley-Cooper; 5th Earl of Shaftesbury; 1761–1811	Cropley Ashley-Cooper; 6th Earl of Shaftesbury; 1768–1851
Anthony Ashley-Cooper; 7th Earl of Shaftesbury; 1801–1885
Anthony Ashley-Cooper; 8th Earl of Shaftesbury; 1831–1886
Anthony Ashley-Cooper; 9th Earl of Shaftesbury; 1869–1961
Anthony Ashley-Cooper; Lord Ashley; 1900–1947
Anthony Ashley-Cooper; 10th Earl of Shaftesbury; 1938–2004
Anthony Ashley-Cooper; 11th Earl of Shaftesbury; 1977–2005	Nicholas Ashley-Cooper; 12th Earl of Shaftesbury born 1979
Anthony Ashley-Cooper; Lord Ashley born 2011
