= Anthony Ashley-Cooper, 11th Earl of Shaftesbury =

English accountant and aristocrat

The Right Honourable The Earl of Shaftesbury
- Predecessor: Anthony Ashley-Cooper, 10th Earl of Shaftesbury
- Successor: Nicholas Ashley-Cooper, 12th Earl of Shaftesbury
- Other titles: 11th Baron Cooper of Pawlett; 11th Baron Ashley of Wimborne St Giles
- Born: Anthony Nils Christian Ashley-Cooper; 24 June 1977
- Died: 15 May 2005 (aged 27); St. Vincent's Hospital, Manhattan, New York City, U.S.
- Cause of death: Heart attack
- Buried: Wimborne Parish Church
- Residence: Earl's Court, London; Mainsail Haul, Wimborne St Giles
- Locality: East Dorset
- Parents: Anthony Ashley-Cooper, 10th Earl of Shaftesbury; Christina Eva Montan

Anthony Nils Christian Ashley-Cooper, 11th Earl of Shaftesbury (24 June 1977 – 15 May 2005) was the elder son of Anthony Ashley-Cooper, 10th Earl of Shaftesbury by his second marriage to the Swedish-born Christina Eva Montan.

He became the 11th Earl of Shaftesbury (retroactively) in 2004, as a result of the discovery of his father's body in 2005 at the bottom of a ravine in Théoule-sur-Mer, on the outskirts of Cannes in the south of France.

The 10th Earl went missing in November 2004 and his body was discovered in early 2005. The then Lord Ashley technically inherited the earldom immediately upon the death of his father, who was murdered by the brother of his third wife, Jamila M'Barek. However, as his father was only believed to be missing, the inheritance was actually not confirmed until his body was found.

== Biography ==
Unlike his father, who pursued the hedonistic lifestyle of an international playboy, the 11th Earl appears to have led a far more sedate and ordinary existence, living quietly at his flat at Earl's Court in London where he was employed as an accountant. He was reportedly looking forward to getting to grips with the task of managing the family's estates at Wimborne St Giles in Dorset after enjoying a short holiday in the United States where he was visiting his younger brother Nicholas, who worked as a disc jockey in New York City. It was during this holiday that the 11th Earl suddenly died after an apparent heart attack on a Sunday some six weeks after assuming the title. Lord Shaftesbury was 27 years old.

The family issued a statement through Sussex Police:

The 11th Earl of Shaftesbury died suddenly and unexpectedly on 15 May in New York. He suffered a heart attack, although the precise cause of death has not yet been identified and the coroner's study is ongoing. Following some press speculation, the family is keen to stress that there is every reason to believe that Lord Shaftesbury died of natural causes.

The office of the chief medical officer in New York confirmed that Lord Shaftesbury had died at St Vincent's Hospital in Manhattan, adding that the cause of death was still under investigation; "It's still being studied. We are still doing tests, it will be at least another week before we can confirm anything."

Prior to his inheritance, he was known as Lord Ashley. He also held the subsidiary titles Baron Ashley and Baron Cooper. He was educated at Marlborough College and the University of Bristol, where he obtained a BSc degree. The late Earl's younger brother Nicholas Edmund Anthony Ashley-Cooper succeeded as the 12th Earl of Shaftesbury.

Peerage of England
Preceded by Anthony Ashley-Cooper	Earl of Shaftesbury; 2004–2005	Succeeded by Nicholas Ashley-Cooper
