= Anthony Ashley-Cooper, 10th Earl of Shaftesbury =

British peer (1938–2004)

The Right Honourable The Earl of Shaftesbury
- Lord Shaftesbury in Nice, 2004
- Tenure: 1961–2004
- Predecessor: Anthony Ashley-Cooper, 9th Earl of Shaftesbury
- Successor: Anthony Ashley-Cooper, 11th Earl of Shaftesbury
- Other titles: Baron Ashley of Wimborne St Giles; Baron Cooper of Pawlett
- Known for: Philanthropy; conservation
- Born: Anthony Ashley-Cooper; 22 May 1938; London, England
- Died: c. 5 November 2004 (aged 66); Cannes, Provence-Alpes-Côte d'Azur, France
- Cause of death: Murder by asphyxiation
- Body discovered: Théoule-sur-Mer, Alpes-Maritimes, France
- Buried: Parish Church at Wimborne St Giles
- Residence: Nice, France; St Giles House in Wimborne St Giles
- Spouses: Bianca de Paolis (m. 1966; div. 1976) Christina Montan (m. 1976; div. 2000) Jamila M'Barek (m. 2002, murdered him 2004)
- Issue: Anthony Ashley-Cooper, 11th Earl of Shaftesbury; Nicholas Ashley-Cooper, 12th Earl of Shaftesbury
- Father: Major Anthony Ashley-Cooper, Lord Ashley
- Mother: Françoise Soulier

Anthony Ashley-Cooper, 10th Earl of Shaftesbury (22 May 1938 – c. 5 November 2004), styled Lord Ashley between 1947 and 1961, and Earl of Shaftesbury from 1961 until his death, was a British peer from Wimborne St Giles, Dorset, England. He was the son of Major Lord Ashley and Françoise Soulier.

Lord Shaftesbury was the grandson of the 9th Earl of Shaftesbury. Shaftesbury's father was the heir apparent to the earldom and its subsidiary titles, but he predeceased his father, the 9th Earl. His death made his son next in the line of succession. When his grandfather died in 1961, Tony became the 10th Earl of Shaftesbury, Baron Ashley of Wimborne St Giles and Baron Cooper of Pawlett.

The 10th Earl of Shaftesbury was a wealthy landowner of over 9,000 acres (3,600 ha) in East Dorset, and received honours and awards for his philanthropic and conservationist work, which included planting over a million trees in South West England. He served as president of the Shaftesbury Society, pursuing the same goals of his second great grandfather, the 7th Earl of Shaftesbury, who had founded the organisation as Ragged Schools in 1840. He also served as the vice president of Sir David Attenborough's British Butterfly Conservation Society.

In November 2004, the 10th Earl of Shaftesbury went missing while in France, prompting an international police investigation. His remains were found at the bottom of a remote ravine in the foothills of the French Alps five months after his death. Investigations revealed that he was murdered by his brother-in-law during an argument regarding a divorce from his wife, Jamila M'Barek, both of whom were convicted of his murder.

== Education and early years ==
Anthony Ashley-Cooper was born on 22 May 1938 in London, England. He was named after his father, as was tradition for firstborn sons in the Ashley-Cooper family. His father, Major Anthony Ashley-Cooper, Lord Ashley, was the firstborn son of the 9th Earl of Shaftesbury. Notable among his ancestors were the 1st Earl of Shaftesbury, a leader of the Whig party in Parliament, and the 7th Earl of Shaftesbury, a 19th-century evangelical social reformer, who was honoured with the Shaftesbury Memorial Fountain in London's Piccadilly Circus.

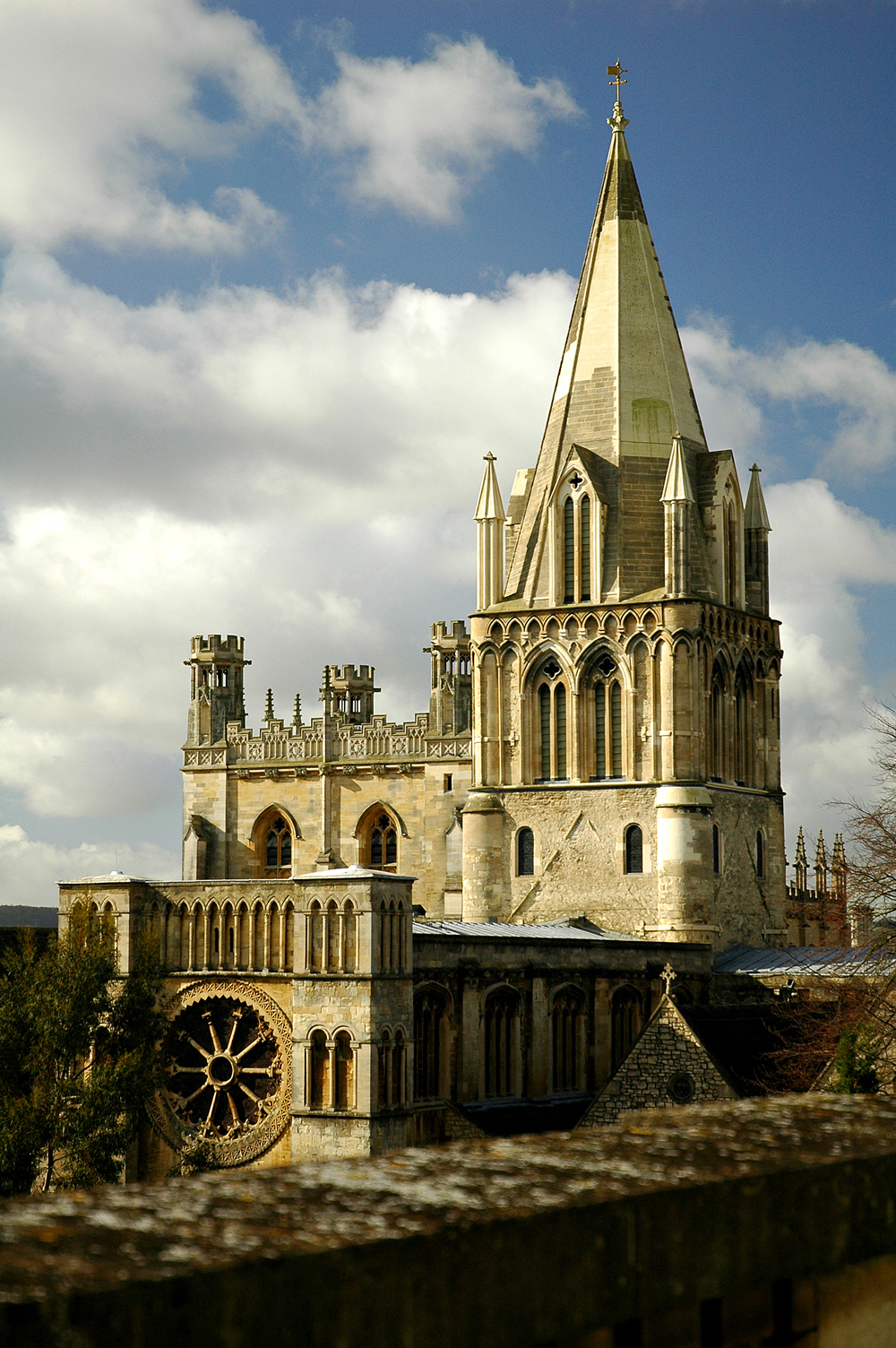
Christ Church at the University of Oxford

Ashley-Cooper's mother was the French-born Françoise Soulier, daughter of Georges Soulier of Caudebec-en-Caux, France. Major Lord Ashley and Françoise remained married until his death in 1947. Anthony's younger sister was Lady Frances Mary Elizabeth Ashley-Cooper (born 9 April 1940).

Ashley-Cooper was educated at Eton and Christ Church, Oxford. As a child, his primary pursuits outside of getting an education included mountain climbing and skiing. He also expressed a love of music, which continued into adulthood with his service as chairman of the London Philharmonic Orchestra from 1966 to 1980. On 8 March 1947, his father died unexpectedly of heart disease and Ashley-Cooper became heir to the titles held by his grandfather and acquired the courtesy title of Lord Ashley.

Lord Ashley's mother decided to move back to her native France with the children. In August 1947, she remarried and settled in Paris. The children spent the next few years shuttling across the English Channel to their boarding schools, Eton for Lord Ashley and Heathfield School in Ascot for his sister, Frances. Holidays were alternately spent in France or with their grandparents at the Manor House in Wimborne St Giles. He was commissioned a second lieutenant in the Royal Armoured Corps, where he did his national service, on 29 June 1957. On 29 October 1958, he was placed in the emergency reserve of the 10th Royal Hussars. Lord Ashley was 22 years old when he succeeded his grandfather.

The 9th Earl of Shaftesbury, prior to his death, invested and arranged financial matters so that his heirs would avoid death duties. When his grandfather died, the newly titled 10th Earl of Shaftesbury came into a vast fortune of the Shaftesbury estates and other properties, including the family's 17th-century home and large estate in Dorset, as well as residences in Hove, London, Versailles and the French Riviera. Shaftesbury also inherited a collection of art, antiques, and other valuables worth over £3m. By the 1990s, the wealth of the family estate remained well worth millions.

=== St Giles House ===
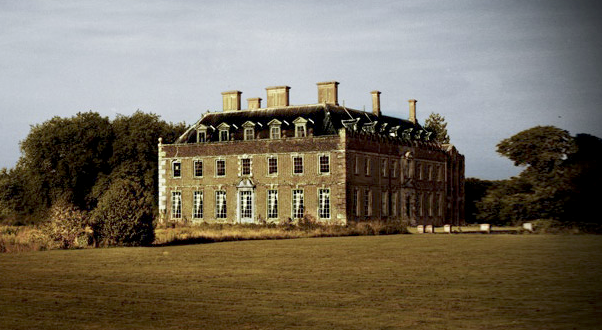
St Giles House, Wimborne St Giles, home of the Earls of Shaftesbury since 1651

The Shaftesbury estate in East Dorset is the home base and centre of business of the Ashley-Coopers. In addition to St Giles House, the family owns a large estate, including over 9,000 acres (3,600 ha), along with property, land, and loughs, that establishes them as one of the wealthiest families in the United Kingdom.

The Ashleys and Ashley-Coopers have made Wimborne St Giles their home since the 15th century. The small village of Wimborne St Giles rests within the family estate itself. The Ashley family arrived in Dorset, originally from Wiltshire, where they had owned the manor of Ashley since the 11th century. The first ancestor to reside in Wimborne St Giles was Robert Ashley (born c. 1415), fifth great grandfather of Anthony Ashley-Cooper, 1st Earl of Shaftesbury.

Built in 1651, the family seat of St Giles House was unoccupied for many years following the death of the 9th Earl of Shaftesbury, and fell into disrepair apart from one wing used as the estate office. In 2001 it was recorded on the Register of Buildings at Risk, as a Grade I listed building, indicating neglect and decay. Buildings recorded on the Grade I list include those of "exceptional interest, sometimes considered to be internationally important". Following extensive repairs, in 2012 the house was reoccupied by the 12th Earl of Shaftesbury and his family.

== Conservation and philanthropy ==
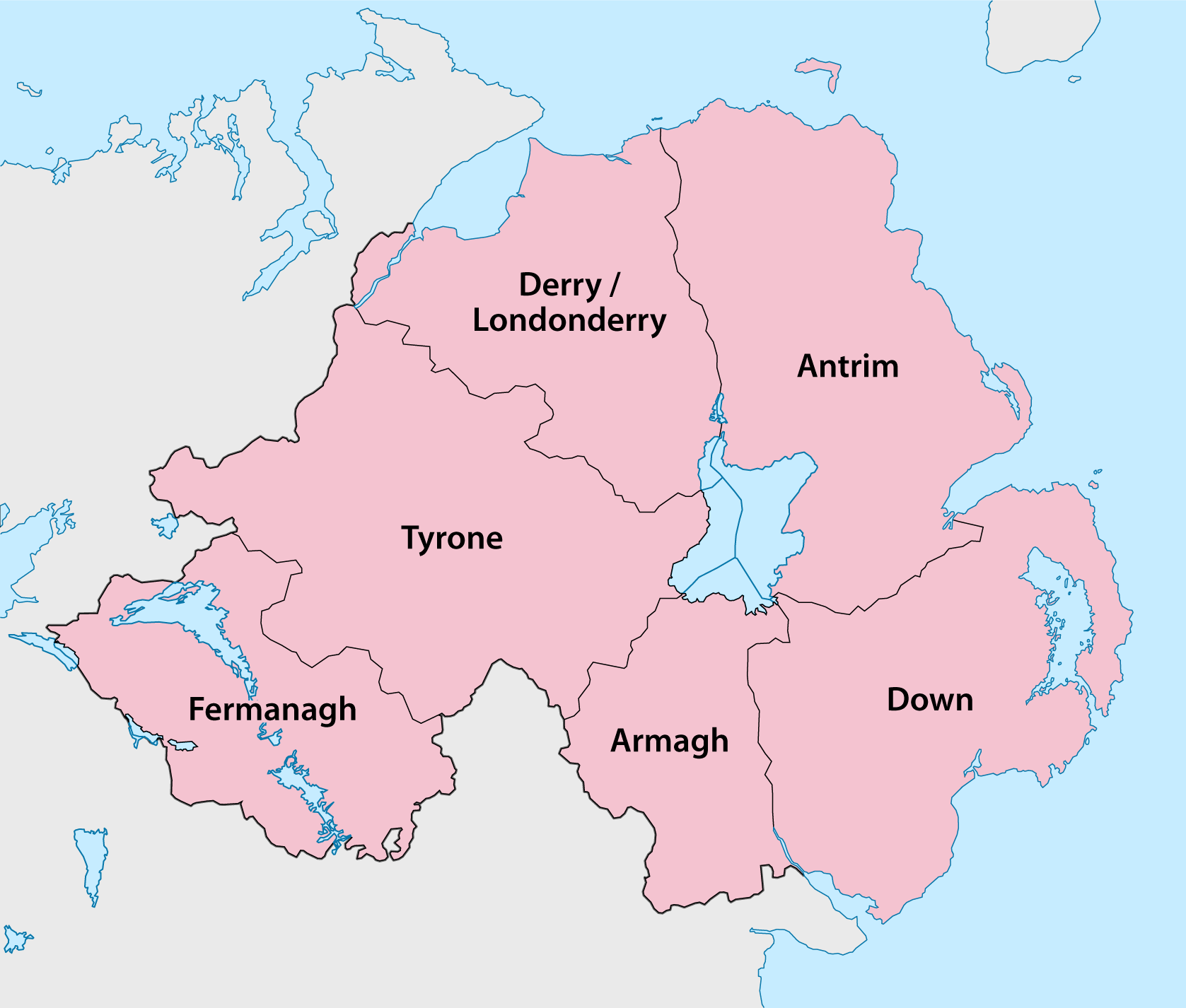
Map of counties surrounding Lough Neagh in Northern Ireland.

Lord Shaftesbury received honours and awards for his conservationist work. He planted more than a million trees on his 9,000-acre (3,600 ha) estate at Wimborne St Giles, Dorset. In 1992, he was the joint winner of the Royal Forestry Society's National Duke of Cornwall Award for Forestry and Conservation, presented by Charles, Prince of Wales. He also served as president of the Hawk and Owl Trust and as vice president of Sir David Attenborough's British Butterfly Conservation Society. According to Philip Rymer, manager of the Shaftesbury Estates, the 10th Earl of Shaftesbury had also put quite a bit of energy into trying to save an endangered species of bat.

Shaftesbury served as president of the Shaftesbury Society, which the 7th Earl of Shaftesbury had founded as Ragged Schools in 1840. The charity provides free education, as well as food, clothing, lodging and other home missionary services for those too poor to pay. In 2007, the Shaftesbury Society was merged with John Groom's Crippleage, reorganising under the new name of Livability.

Shaftesbury owned Lough Neagh in Northern Ireland, which is the source of 40 per cent of Northern Ireland's drinking water. He continued to allow water to be extracted from the lough at no charge.

== House of Lords speech ==
Although a member of the House of Lords, until the passage of the House of Lords Act in 1999, the 10th Earl of Shaftesbury rarely attended. His maiden speech was made on 10 November 1999, the day before the act was passed and came into force. At this time, Shaftesbury made an eight-minute presentation in a debate regarding arts and sport, a portion of which is presented below.

The Earl of Clancarty rose to ask Her Majesty's Government how they believe the arts and sport relate to the issue of "social exclusion".

7 p.m. The Earl of Shaftesbury

My Lords, I apologise to noble Lords for this dramatic last-minute but not opportunistic maiden speech. Although I inherited my title 30 years ago and have attended spasmodically, particularly during the early 1970s when we rigorously debated the Industrial Relations Bill and the European Community Bill of Accession, both in Committee and on Report until extremely late at night, my heart has not entirely been in the thrust and cut of politics, unlike my more distinguished ancestors.

In fact, building a society the Shaftesbury way is not a matter of imprisoning a presumed evil spirit of mankind. It is a matter of beauty and truth. Both Goethe and Voltaire were influenced by the 3rd Lord Shaftesbury. The former particularly reminded us that we must cultivate our garden. We all know about large prize-winning marrows, but are not succulent baby courgettes more perfect? Small is beautiful too...

One of the best sermons I have ever been privileged to hear was by the late Bishop of Winchester. Social exclusion? He said virtually that if one sheep from a flock of 100 goes missing, the good shepherd worries frantically about that single sheep until it is safely found. There are too many sheep, men, women and children, being marginalised. John the Baptist had the answer: why do we not? I remain concerned in these turbulent times, but thank you for your patience. It has been my privilege to be able to speak in your Lordships' House.

== Marriages and children ==
Shaftesbury was married three times. He expressed his attraction to foreign women. At Eton, he wrote an article for the college magazine in which he described English debutantes as "round-shouldered, unsophisticated garglers of pink champagne". His three marriages and scattered relationships with foreign women throughout his life reflected his earlier opinions of English women.

=== Bianca Maria de Paolis ===
Shaftesbury met his Italian-born first wife, Bianca de Paolis, during a skiing holiday. They married in July 1966. Bianca Maria de Paolis (born c. 1926), was the daughter of Gino de Paolis, a Roman banker. She had previously been married to the American film producer, Jack Le Vien. Shaftesbury and de Paolis were declared husband and wife at the Westminster Register Office in front of a few friends, with none of his family in attendance. They divorced 10 years later, on grounds of his adultery with an unnamed woman. The couple had no children.

The former Countess of Shaftesbury, who used the name Contessa Bianca Shaftesbury, released her memoirs in 2008, entitled, A Life on Fire. She died on 16 March 2013, in Rome, Italy. The funeral was held on 18 March 2013 at the church of Santa Maria dei Miracoli in Piazza del Popolo.

=== Christina Eva Montan ===
In December 1976, Shaftesbury married the Swedish-born Christina Eva Montan (born c. 1940). Styled The Countess of Shaftesbury after their marriage, she was the daughter of Nils Montan, the former Swedish Ambassador to Germany. Lady Shaftesbury was also a divorcée with a son and daughter from her first marriage, the half-siblings of the 11th and 12th Earls of Shaftesbury. Frederic Casella is a television producer and director in Britain, while his sister Cecilia is an attorney living in New York City. Shaftesbury and his second wife had two sons:

- Anthony Nils Christian Ashley-Cooper, 11th Earl of Shaftesbury (24 June 1977 – 15 May 2005), first-born son of the 10th Earl of Shaftesbury and his wife. He died of a heart attack in Manhattan, New York, while visiting his younger brother Nicholas and older half-siblings Frederic and Cecilia.
- Nicholas Edmund Anthony Ashley-Cooper, 12th Earl of Shaftesbury (born 3 June 1979), a former DJ and house music promoter in New York and Privilege in Ibiza, Spain. A short time following his brother's death, Nicholas relocated to the family seat at Wimborne St Giles, returned to business school for a couple of years, and assumed the responsibilities of the earldom. He has shown an interest in supporting charitable organisations, primarily those addressing the needs of children with disabilities. In December 2009, Nicholas suffered serious spinal injuries in a horse riding accident. He crushed his vertebrae in the fall. While he experienced initial paralysis necessitating the use of a wheelchair, physical therapy has helped restore his health to the point where he is able to walk, with limitations. With continued rehabilitation, doctors expect a full recovery.

The second marriage of Shaftesbury was more successful than the first, producing two children. The 1999 death of his mother, however, had a profound effect on Shaftesbury, affecting his relationship with his wife and children. Lady Frances Ashley-Cooper, sister of the 10th Earl of Shaftesbury, stated the following.

In August 1999, our mother had died of cancer in tragic circumstances while we were all enjoying ourselves at my eldest son's wedding. For my brother, her death was a catastrophe. He adored her. She had been his protector and greatest admirer since the death of our father in 1947, when Anthony was eight and I was six. When our mother died, it was as though my brother had become an orphan at age 61. Without her, he felt emotionally bereft. He lost his grip on reality. At one point, he had bought a flat in Versailles, and had entirely recreated two rooms from our late mother's house. He had used all the furniture, books and knick-knacks of our childhood in Paris. It was a bit much.

—Lady Frances Ashley-Cooper

In 2000, Shaftesbury unexpectedly moved out of the Manor House and divorced his wife. He left his former wife in charge and passed the running of the estate to his 23-year-old son, Anthony. Christina, Countess of Shaftesbury, and their sons remained in residence in Wimborne St Giles, while the Earl relocated to France, embarking on a string of short-lived and expensive love affairs with younger women distinguished by their exotic looks and equally colourful histories.

Shaftesbury had an apartment in Versailles, (furnished with £3m worth of antique art and furniture) but spent much of his time on the Cote d'Azur where he enjoyed a social life fuelled by drugs and alcohol. His wealth attracted a variety of individuals, willing and ready to take advantage of his generosity. A friend described him as becoming a "philanthropist who specialised in rescuing lap dancers" while his French lawyer, Thierry Bensaude, more diplomatically referred to him as "a philosophical adventurer in society".

In early 2002, an article in the Daily Telegraph described the 63-year-old lord, "dressed in leather trousers and open-necked, pink silk shirts, with a gold chain draped around his neck". Shaftesbury had fallen hard for a 29-year-old French model named Nathalie Lions. In 2006, an article in the Guardian wrote of his relationship with Lions, with whom he would be found "frolicking at Bellini's bar in Kensington, where he liberally wrote cheques and Lions spent them". He refused to listen to others who warned him that she was taking advantage of him. They toured the party spots of London, Barbados, and the Riviera until a tabloid exposé revealed Lions' past as a "Penthouse Pet" for Penthouse magazine and Shaftesbury called off the relationship. Rather than return to England, he remained on the French Riviera.

=== Jamila Ben M'Barek ===
The 10th Earl of Shaftesbury became a familiar figure in some of the nightspots on the French Riviera. He was known for his black leather trousers, pink shirts, and large red and black glasses. He had a habit of flashing his money around as he bought drinks for a wide variety of female companions. At one such establishment on the Riviera, he met Jamila Ben M'Barek (born c. 1961), a divorcée and the mother of two children from a previous relationship. She was one of seven children born in Paris to a Tunisian mother and a Moroccan father. In 1993, M'Barek had posed naked in Playboy. They were married on 5 November 2002, at Hilversum in the Netherlands.

To the disappointment of his family, he became infatuated with M'Barek, buying her a flat in Cannes for £500,000 and transferring other properties into her name after they married.

By April 2004, the couple were separated when Lord Shaftesbury started a new relationship with a young mother of two named Nadia Orche, who has been described as a "club hostess from Cannes" and a "Moroccan prostitute". The difference in their ages did not bother her. She described him as "an attentive and generous man". According to Orche, Shaftesbury was planning to marry her after getting a divorce from his third wife.

== Disappearance and murder ==
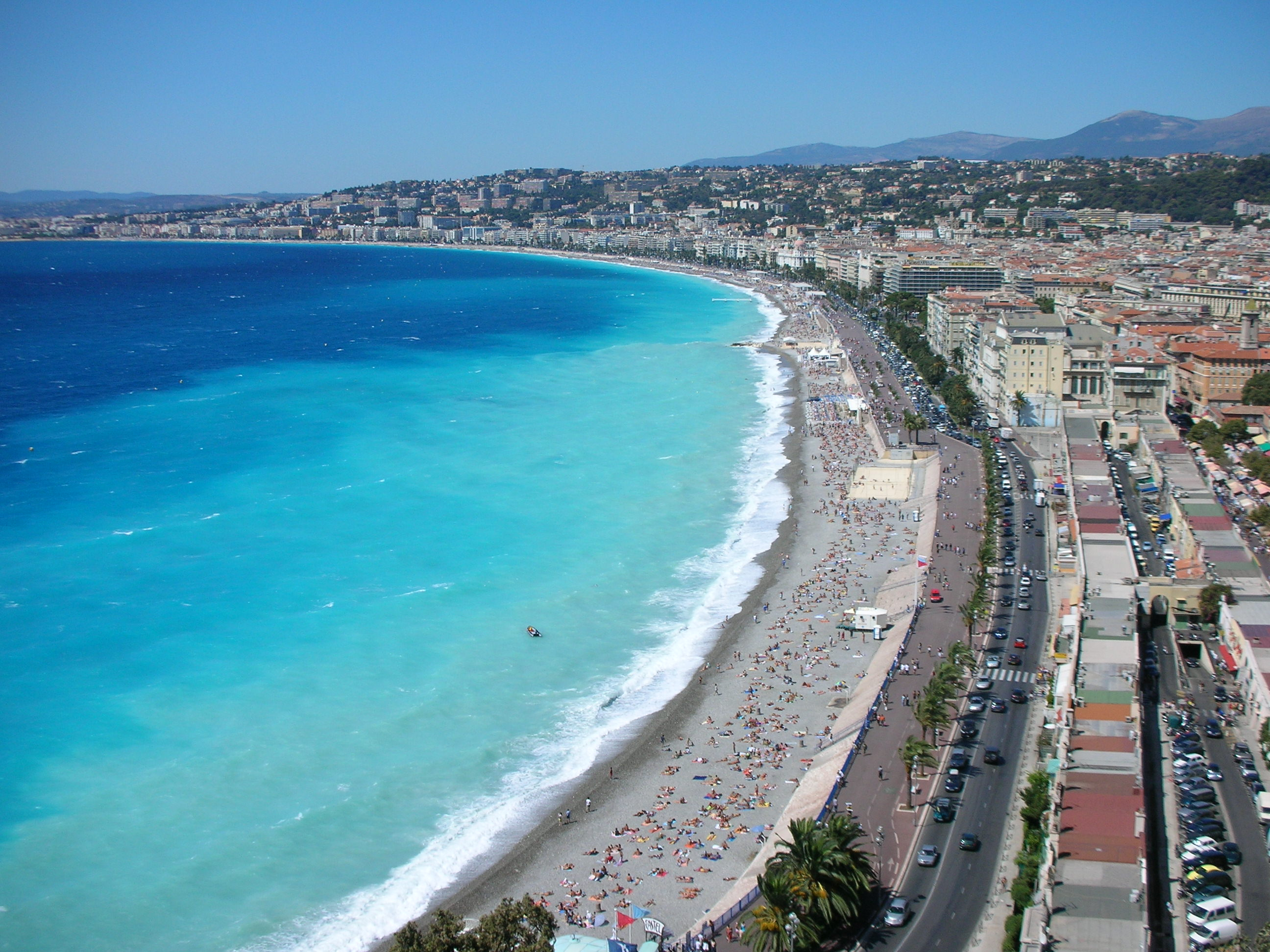
Seafront at Nice, from where Shaftesbury disappeared

On 3 November 2004, Shaftesbury arrived in Nice, France, scheduled to meet with his estranged wife. On 4 November, he visited her at her home on Avenue Mareschal Koenig. He later checked into the £130-a-night, four-star Noga Hilton on the Cannes seafront. The following day, after checking out of the hotel, Shaftesbury vanished without a trace. From that point forward, the whereabouts of the 10th Earl of Shaftesbury were unknown until April of the following year.

=== Friends and family become concerned ===
It was normal for Shaftesbury occasionally to disappear for a few days from time to time, so no one other than his girlfriend was initially concerned with his disappearance. "Anthony didn't answer his telephone anymore. I was worried," she says, "I called again. I called England. This wasn't like him. I was sure that something bad had happened."

On 15 November 2004, Shaftesbury's Nice-based lawyer, Thierry Bensaude, reported him missing after being contacted by his girlfriend, Orche. The peer divided his time between the Riviera and a home in Hove, East Sussex. He had been due to return home on 10 November. After not hearing from Shaftesbury in a week, they remained concerned when he failed to return to his rented flat in Adelaide Crescent, Hove. Bensaude and Orche both expressed fears for his safety. Shaftesbury had been taking legal action in relation to the theft of some family antiques and artwork. Some friends and acquaintances mentioned that he had complained of money problems, so they surmised that his disappearance may have had something to do with the theft and financial loss.

On 18 November, the French police publicly appealed for information leading to Shaftesbury's whereabouts; on 22 November, they opened a formal criminal inquiry. Anthony Nils, elder son of the 10th Earl of Shaftesbury, was regularly in touch with the police following his father's disappearance and travelled to Nice to confer with French authorities there. The Rev. David Paskins of the Wimborne St Giles parish church said, "Everyone is anxious and concerned — it's the unknown that is worrying. Lady Shaftesbury [Christina] is very concerned."

=== Theories on Shaftesbury's whereabouts ===
Family and concerned individuals initially feared that the 10th Earl of Shaftesbury had been kidnapped by Russian or North African gangsters who were plotting to steal his fortune. Thierry Bensaude stated that Shaftesbury is "extremely generous to his friends and may have been taken advantage of". His former wife claimed that she had warned her husband about the company he was keeping. The theory was that some of his more disreputable acquaintances had decided to kidnap the peer and were now engaged in some scheme to force him into signing away part of his inherited wealth.

Commander Brunache said, "We took the case very seriously. There were a number of possible explanations for his disappearance. He could have decided to disappear, a suicide, or he could have been the victim of a crime. There were several possibilities and we were exploring all of them."

Within a month of Shaftesbury's disappearance, Detective Chief Superintendent Graham Cox, head of Sussex Police CID, who had been contacted by Lady Frances Ashley-Cooper, said that they were treating the matter as a murder case. The French police agreed with Cox, due to the lack of ransom demands or signs of fraud. Whether dead or alive, there were still no clues as to the whereabouts of the 10th Earl of Shaftesbury.

=== Confession and arrest ===
In February 2005, his wife Jamila M'Barek was admitted to a psychiatric hospital, where she had an emotional breakdown and began confessing to her involvement in her husband's death. When interviewed by police, she claimed that Shaftesbury had been beaten to death by her brother during a fight at her flat in Cannes.

Shaftesbury and his third wife had separated in April 2004 and divorce proceedings had been set in motion. By that time, he had given her a windmill in the Gers region of southwestern France, the €700,000 duplex in a villa in Cannes, which included staff, a 4x4 car, and a monthly allowance, ranging between €7,500 and €10,000. Shaftesbury wanted to end this arrangement and the marriage, so that he could marry his new girlfriend. While Shaftesbury was discussing his desire with his wife, a fight broke out between him and his wife's brother, Mohammed M'Barek. Lord Shaftesbury died during the fight, when Mohammed strangled him, breaking his neck.

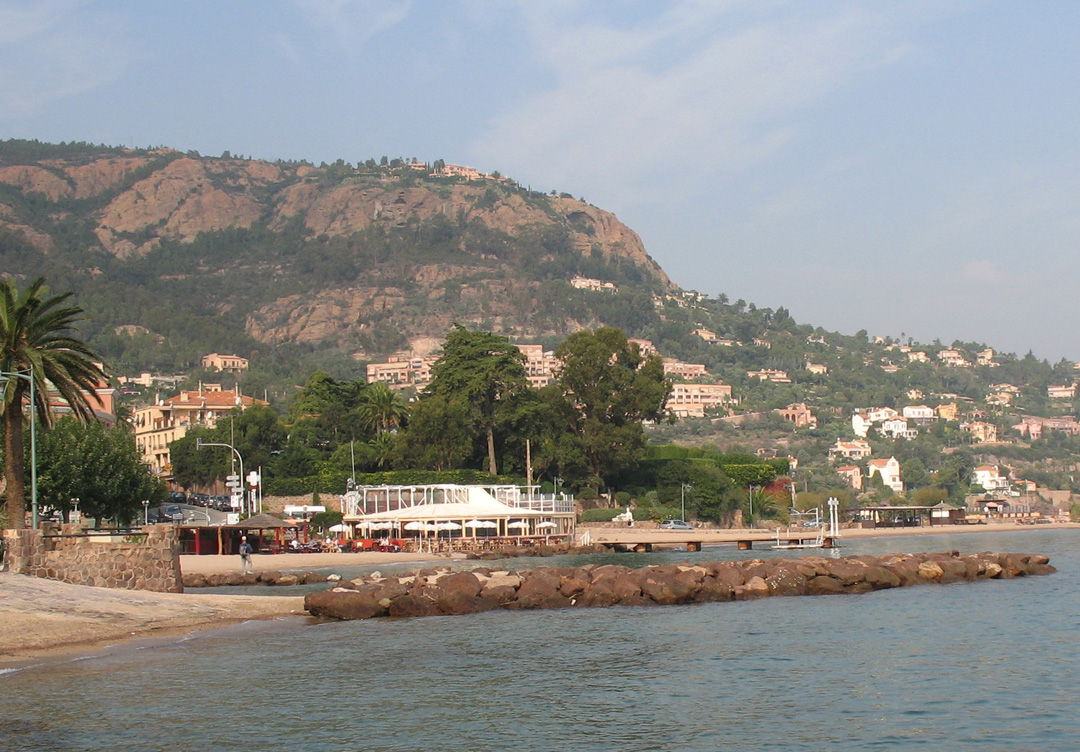
Théoule-sur-Mer in France where the body of Anthony Ashley-Cooper, 10th Earl of Shaftesbury, was found

According to Jamila M'Barek, her brother placed her husband's body in the boot of his BMW and dumped it in an unknown place. She was arrested on 25 February 2005 and her brother was arrested by German police the following day at his home in Munich. He was later extradited to France, continuing to deny his involvement and knowledge of the location of Lord Shaftesbury's body.

On 7 April 2005, a body in an advanced state of decomposition was discovered by the French authorities in a valley at Théoule-sur-Mer, Alpes-Maritimes on the outskirts of Cannes. The police were led to the area by examining the last-known signal from Lord Shaftesbury's mobile phone records. After a two-day search, they found a decomposed body that had been partly eaten by animals, hidden in the undergrowth next to the riverbed. A French police spokesman announced, "As far as we are concerned, there is absolutely no doubt it is him." This belief was confirmed through DNA testing on 18 April 2005.

In June 2006, pre-trial proceedings began in Grasse, before the investigating Magistrate, Catherine Bonnici. The proceedings were part of the French investigative process that is used to determine whether prosecutors have enough evidence to send a case to trial. During the first week of June, the court travelled to the site where the peer's body was found. Mohamed M'Barek was transported in leg chains for the one-day reenactment. Once they arrived, M'Barek demonstrated that he had enough strength to have acted alone. He managed to lift a 182 lb (83 kg) dummy — the same weight as Shaftesbury's body — out of the boot of a car and dump it down a ravine.

Jamila M'Barek told the court that she was not with her brother when he disposed of the body, and in fact, she stated that she had never been to the site. She claimed that she had no role in the killing other than helping her brother, under duress, load the body into his car. She told investigators, "I did not want him to die. I just wanted my brother to intimidate him so that he would continue to pay me my allowance. But he didn't want to have anything to do with it, so a violent quarrel broke out. I left the room because I could not stand to see what was happening".

=== Trial at the Palais de Justice ===
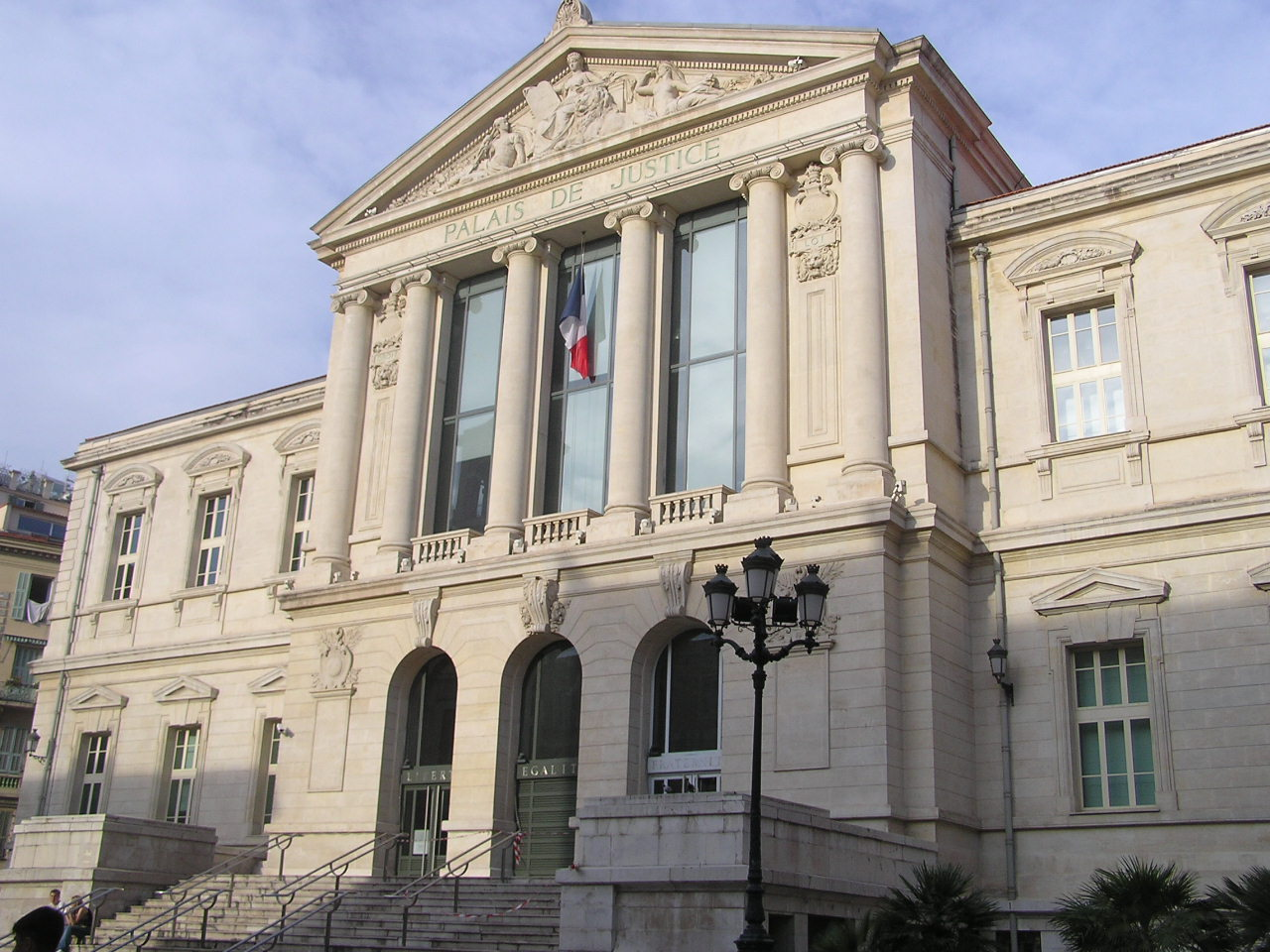
Palais de Justice de Nice, France; Court Hall in Nice, France

On 22 May 2007, the trial of Jamila M'Barek and Mohamed M'Barek opened at the Palais de Justice in Nice, 2 1/2 years after the death of the 10th Earl of Shaftesbury. The presiding judge of the jury trial was Nicole Besset, with Jean-Louis Moreau serving as the state prosecutor. Shaftesbury's widow was represented by attorney Franck De Vita, while her brother was represented by Melanie Juginger. The Ashley-Cooper family was represented by attorney Philippe Soussi. A forensic examination of the skeletal remains revealed injuries including a broken ankle, and a double fracture to the larynx which indicated strangulation as the cause of death. At times, both Mme M'Barek and her brother admitted their involvement in the death of Lord Shaftesbury, and the French authorities decided to charge both her and her brother with the crime of premeditated murder.

==== Magistrate's investigative report ====
The trial began with a presentation of the investigative report, which was read to the court by Jean-Louis Moreau, the state prosecutor. The report described Shaftesbury's widow as "an escort girl who loved the high life" who "chose the life of a kept woman, with multiple affairs with men she chose for their bank accounts and their assets". Having struck gold when she married the 10th Earl of Shaftesbury, she then faced "looming financial disaster" in the event of a divorce and set out "consciously and without constraint, to accomplish his assassination".

Testimony was presented that in October 2002, Mme M'Barek had convinced the peer that she was pregnant with his child, and as a result, Shaftesbury married her on 5 November 2002. Shaftesbury made out a new will leaving his new wife properties in Ireland and France. Two years later, with no child forthcoming, he began looking elsewhere for affection. When Shaftesbury initiated divorce proceedings, his wife feared losing her valuable inheritance and began to take steps to secure her financial future.

Lady Frances Ashley-Cooper testified. "When my brother said he would divorce her, she would not accept". She stated that before the separation, Shaftesbury was convinced by his wife to sell the Versailles flat. Testimony continued, regarding the disappearance of antique furniture and family artefacts.

[Jamila] and Mohammed arranged to empty the flat and when my brother asked where his mother's furniture had gone to, she said it was on a boat to Tunisia where it was going to be sold. My brother was distraught. This was cruel emotional blackmail. In fact, the furniture was in storage in Cannes, but my brother never knew that. I have just managed to get hold of the key.

—Lady Frances Ashley-Cooper

==== Defence statements ====
Mme M'Barek discounted the investigative report and stated that her marriage to Shaftesbury "was a curse", describing her husband as "a loner" who "had no friends" which is why "he drank a lot". She portrayed him as a "violent, sex-crazed alcoholic, hooked on cocaine". While she freely admitted that her brother had indeed killed her husband, she testified that it was all an accident.

There was blood on the floor. I did not know if it was my brother or my husband's blood. My brother could not believe my husband was dead.

—Jamila M'Barek

She further admitted that after her husband was dead, she helped her brother load his body into the boot of his black BMW. She prefaced this admission with additional claims.

He forced me to put the body in the boot of the car. He forced me to follow him as I thought we were going to a hospital. Then he asked me to go away.

—Jamila M'Barek

Her brother Mohammed M'Barek presented a similar defence.

I am innocent, my sister is innocent. It was an accident.

—Mohammed M'Barek

According to Monsieur M'Barek's account of events, he had been drinking heavily and smoking cannabis when he was confronted with the "excited and aggressive" 10th Earl of Shaftesbury. A fight then broke out during which he "accidentally" strangled his brother-in-law while attempting to restrain him. Although M'Barek was rather hazy on the details, he testified, "I don't know how it happened. It happened in a minute". He further stated that he had done everything he could to save the Earl, including mouth-to-mouth resuscitation and heart massage, but it "was too late. He had left us".

Mohammed M'Barek expressed frustration with the French authorities that had kept him "in prison for two-and-a-half years for nothing". He thought it was an outrage that the French regarded the dumping of an inconveniently dead body in a ravine as a crime. He even went so far as to appeal to the new French president Nicolas Sarkozy for justice. On the third day of the trial, the courtroom descended into chaos as Monsieur M'Barek burst into tears and then jumped to his feet pointing at Shaftesbury's family. He attempted to blame the Ashley-Cooper family for the peer's death, claiming that they were the guilty ones. "You're the guilty ones, you the rich, who want to take his inheritance!" he shouted as police wrestled with him in the dock. After refusing requests from his lawyer and the judge to sit down and be quiet, M'Barek was taken down to the cells and the hearing temporarily adjourned.

The French authorities suspected that there was a conspiracy to murder Shaftesbury, when they discovered that Mme M'Barek transferred €150,000 into her brother's bank account the week following her husband's disappearance. The prosecution viewed this as payment for services rendered, although Mme M'Barek testified that she had given her brother the money in order for him to buy a house for their ailing mother.

In her defence, Mme M'Barek denied any financial motive in wishing her husband dead and claimed that she had no need of his fortune, stating that she had "always been prosperous". She testified that the source of her prosperity was the generosity of wealthy individuals who were prepared to pay for her company. She named three prominent celebrities as her former clients. All three individuals denied ever meeting Jamila M'Barek and declined to attend court to comment on her allegations or serve as character witnesses.

Mme M'Barek further stated that the arguments she had with her husband had nothing to do with money, but rather arose as a result of Lord Shaftesbury's excessive sexual demands brought on by his seemingly endless injections of testosterone.

==== Conviction and sentencing ====
The strongest piece of evidence presented by the prosecution were details revealed in a secretly recorded telephone conversation between Jamila M'Barek and her sister, Naima, in which the former discussed £100,000 (€150,000) blood money paid to her brother. She additionally recounted precisely how she was going to blame her brother for her husband's death. The wiretap also uncovered the truth about Jamila M'Barek's visit to the remote spot where her husband's body was found. This was supported when downloaded records from the GPS tracking device in her cellphone provided details that she (or at least her cellphone) had been there two days prior to Shaftesbury's death.

On 25 May 2007, after deliberating for two hours, the jury returned guilty verdicts against both brother and sister. Jamila M'Barek and her brother were each sentenced to 25 years in prison. Under French law, they each have an automatic right to appeal their conviction, which results in a retrial of the case. After the trial, Mohammed M'Barek was admitted to a psychiatric ward. His initial plans to appeal have been dropped. On appeal by his sister, the court was informed that he was in an "incoherent and mostly delirious state" and would be unable to testify on either his behalf or on the behalf of his sister.

On 4 February 2009, Jamila M'Barek appeared in a court in southern France to appeal her conviction. After the jury deliberated for four hours, her sentence was reduced from 25 to 20 years at a Court of Appeal in Aix-en-Provence. With all appeals exhausted, the 12th Earl of Shaftesbury expressed his relief at the verdict and said he could now get on with his life after closing a "very painful chapter".

== Funeral and burial ==
On 30 September 2005, funeral services were held for Anthony Ashley-Cooper, 10th Earl of Shaftesbury. Hundreds of mourners were in attendance, held at the parish church in Wimborne St Giles. Those in attendance included Shaftesbury's second wife, Christina, Countess of Shaftesbury; his son, the 12th Earl of Shaftesbury; and his sister, Lady Frances Ashley-Cooper.

Charles Palmer-Tomkinson read from Khalil Gibran's The Prophet, while Shaftesbury's sister read from For These Once Mine, by George Santayana. "The Prayer of St Francis of Assisi" was read by Shaftesbury's son, Nicholas, who had inherited the title of 12th Earl of Shaftesbury a few months prior.

After the 45-minute service, Shaftesbury's ashes were taken to the church and placed in the family crypt in Wimborne St Giles. He was buried next to his eldest son, Anthony Nils Christian Ashley-Cooper, 11th Earl of Shaftesbury, who died on 15 May 2005, six months after his father. The Reverend David Paskins, parish priest, said after the ceremony, "It was a very inspiring occasion. They have had a very difficult time and have borne it with great dignity and fortitude".

Peerage of England
Preceded by Anthony Ashley-Cooper	Earl of Shaftesbury; 1961–2004; Member of the House of Lords (1961–1999)	Succeeded by Anthony Ashley-Cooper
