= Nicholas Ashley-Cooper, 12th Earl of Shaftesbury =

English peer

The Right Honourable The Earl of Shaftesbury DL
- Tenure: 15 May 2005 – present
- Predecessor: Anthony Ashley-Cooper, 11th Earl of Shaftesbury
- Other titles: Baron Ashley of Wimborne St Giles, Baron Cooper of Pawlett
- Known for: Landowner
- Born: Nicholas Edmund Anthony Ashley-Cooper; 3 June 1979 (age 46); London
- Residence: London and Wimborne St Giles
- Spouse: Dinah Streifeneder (m. 2010)
- Issue: Anthony Ashley-Cooper, Lord Ashley; Lady Viva Ashley-Cooper; Lady Zara Ashley-Cooper
- Parents: The 10th Earl of Shaftesbury; Christina Eva Montan
- Website: shaftesburyestates.com stgileshouse.com

Nicholas Edmund Anthony Ashley-Cooper, 12th Earl of Shaftesbury, DL (born 3 June 1979), also known as Nick Ashley-Cooper or Nick Shaftesbury, is an English peer and landowner. He succeeded his brother as Earl of Shaftesbury in 2005.

He also holds the subsidiary titles Baron Ashley and Baron Cooper.

== Early life and education ==
Nicholas Ashley-Cooper was born on 3 June 1979, in London, the younger son of Anthony Ashley-Cooper, 10th Earl of Shaftesbury (1938–2004), and his second wife Christina Eva Montan (born c. 1940), the daughter of Nils Montan, a former Swedish ambassador to Germany.

He had an elder brother, Anthony Nils Christian Ashley-Cooper (1977–2005), who in 2004 became 11th Earl of Shaftesbury, and also an elder half-brother and half-sister from Lady Shaftesbury's first marriage.

He was educated at Eton College, however, he quit Eton at the age of 16 because it was claimed he "hated the ethos and routines".

Afterwards he then emigrated to New York where he was a DJ and musician in bars and clubs around Manhattan.

=== Father's murder and brother's death ===
His father, Anthony Ashley-Cooper, 10th Earl of Shaftesbury, was murdered in November 2004 by his third wife, Jamila M'Barek and her brother Mohammad.

Six months later, on 15 May 2005, Anthony Ashley-Cooper, 11th Earl of Shaftesbury died of a heart attack in Manhattan, New York, while visiting his younger brother, and Nick Ashley-Cooper then unexpectedly succeeded him in the earldom. He relocated to his family home from New York City and accepted the title of Earl. Back in Britain, Ashley-Cooper then attended the London Business School before going onto work in private business.

== Shaftesbury Estates ==
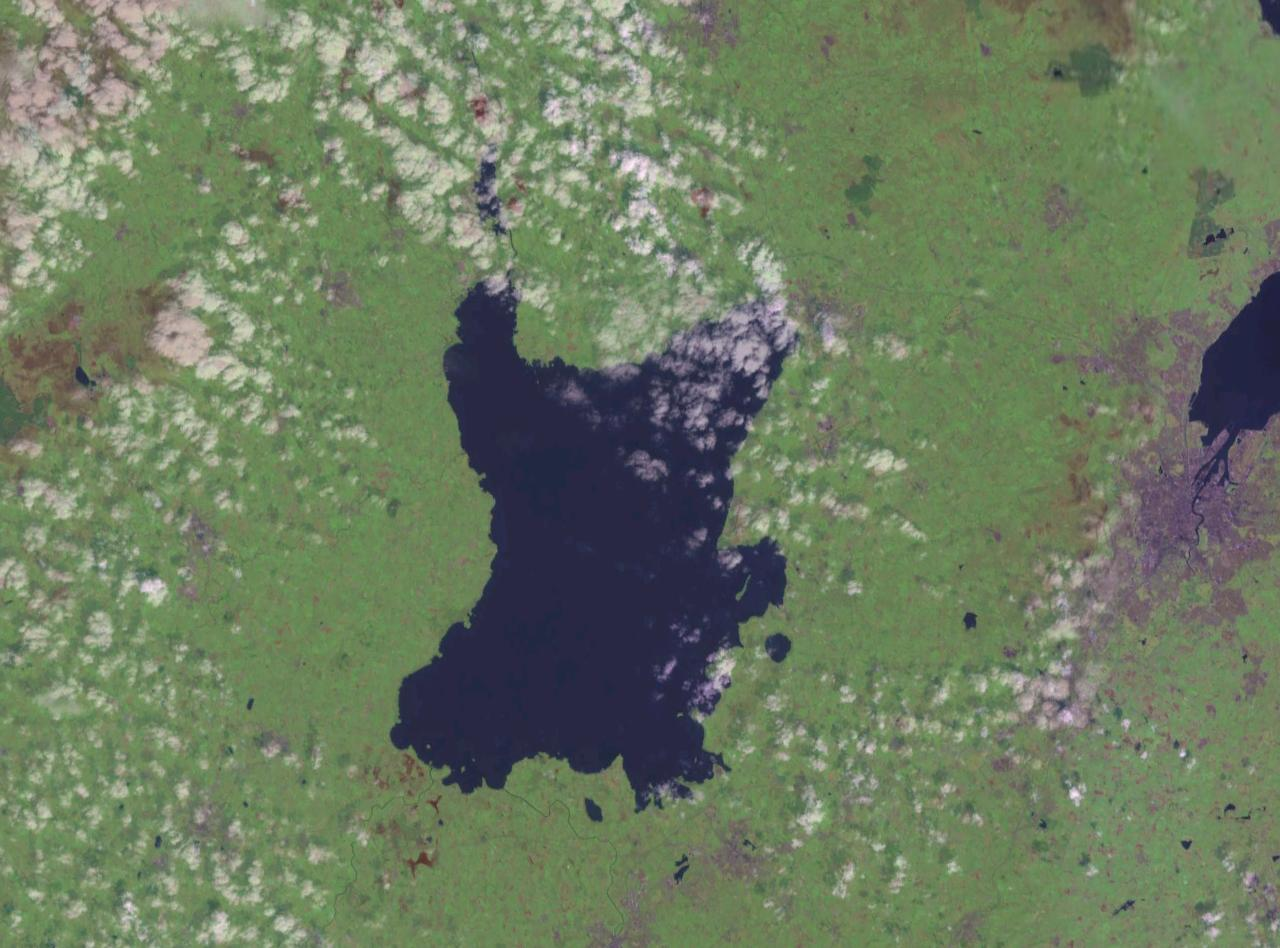
Lough Neagh

Wimborne St Giles in East Dorset is the home base and centre of business of the Ashley-Cooper family. Built in 1651, the family seat of St Giles House had fallen into disrepair as it had been unoccupied for approximately 60 years. In 2001, St Giles House was recorded on the Register of Buildings at Risk, as a Grade I listed building, indicating neglect and decay. Buildings recorded on the Grade I list include those of "exceptional interest, sometimes considered to be internationally important".

Discussions regarding future use of St Giles House and the estate have been resumed following inheritance by the 12th Earl of Shaftesbury. Work on the house began in 2011 and since then the restoration has won national awards including the 2014 Georgian Group Awards for the Restoration of a Georgian Country House, the 2015 Royal Institution of Chartered Surveyors (RICS) Award for Building Conservation, the 2015 Historic Houses Association/Sotheby's Restoration Award, and the Historic England Angel Award, Best Rescue of a Historic Building or Site. During the First World War, part of St Giles House was used as a hospital, and in the Second World War, the house was requisitioned and used as a school for girls evacuated from London, Miss Faunce's Parents' National Union School, with the 9th Earl then moving to an apartment within the house. In 1954, the burden of running the house became too great and the family took up residence at the dower house, known as Mainsail Haul.

=== Lough Neagh ===
Lord Shaftesbury also inherited the ownership of the bed and soil of Lough Neagh in Northern Ireland, the largest lake in Ireland or the United Kingdom.

The lough supplies 40% of the region's drinking water and is also used as a sewage outfall. Discussions over the future management of the Lough have been ongoing with the Northern Ireland Assembly.

In October 2023, after negative publicity stemming from a report revealing that Lough Neagh had experienced its worst-ever levels of harmful bacteria amid a long-term infestation of toxic algae, Lord Shaftesbury stated in an interview with BBC Northern Ireland that while he was open to selling Lough Neagh to the Northern Ireland Assembly, he would "not give it away for free." He stated in the interview that "the sale is one that's borne out of an understanding that my ownership has always been very divisive and quite political and I always get blamed for things that are completely outside of my control. I feel it's often used as an excuse for political inaction and I always want to do the right thing by the people living here and what's in the best interest of the lough."

== Personal life ==
In 2010, Lord Shaftesbury married Dinah Esther Streifeneder, a veterinary surgeon from Munich, in Dorset. Dinah is the daughter of Friedrich Georg "Fritz" Streifeneder, an orthopedic surgeon, and Renata, née Leander, a physiotherapist.

The couple have three children. Their son, Anthony Francis Wolfgang Ashley-Cooper, Lord Ashley, born on 24 January 2011, is his father's heir apparent and the only person in the line of succession to the earldom.

A daughter, Lady Viva Constance Lillemor Ashley-Cooper, was born in 2012, and another daughter, Lady Zara Emily Tove Ashley-Cooper, in 2014.

Shaftesbury has taken on philanthropic work, including the role of Chairman of the Talbot Village Trust. He was also an ambassador for the spinal cord injuries charity Wings for Life, which he began supporting following his own spinal injury. He has competed in several marathons and ultramarathons to benefit charitable organisations.

In 2019, he was commissioned to the honorary position of Deputy Lord Lieutenant of Dorset.

Peerage of England
Preceded by Anthony Ashley-Cooper	Earl of Shaftesbury; 2005–present	Incumbent
