= Benjamin Goodison =

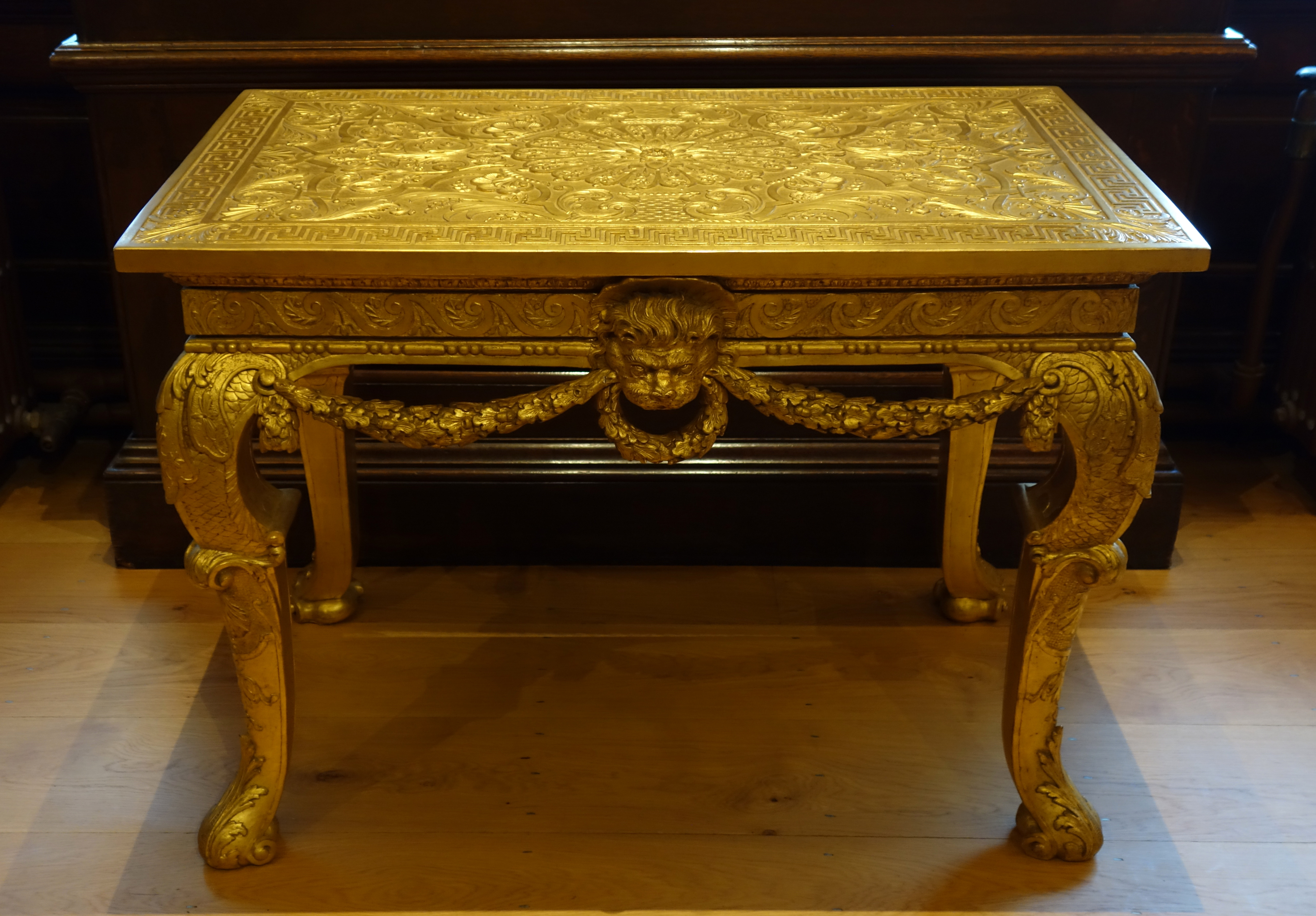
Side table attributed to Benjamin Goodison, c. 1730, Kensington Palace, London

Benjamin Goodison (c. 1700 – 1767), of London, was a royal cabinetmaker to George II of Great Britain, supplying furnishings to the royal palaces from 1727 to the time of his death. He served his apprenticeship with James Moore, who died accidentally in October 1726; Moore was the pre-eminent London cabinetmaker during the reign of George I. Goodison's classicizing case furniture owes much of its inspiration to the neo-Palladian designs of William Kent; outstanding documented examples are the pair of part-gilded mahogany commodes and library writing-tables Goodison made for Sir Thomas Robinson of Rokeby Hall, Yorkshire, now in the Royal Collection; they have boldly-scaled Greek key fret in their friezes and lion masks gripping brass rings heading scrolling consoles at their corners.

Goodison's shop was established at the "Golden Spread Eagle" in Long Acre as early as 1727. Long Acre, in the parish of St Martin-in-the-Fields, was positioned for easy access from Westminster and the fashionable West End of London.

== Goodison, royal cabinet-maker ==
For the furnishing of new apartments at Hampton Court Palace, Goodison supplied for the Queen's Staircase, the octagonal brass lantern surmounted by a royal crown; it cost £138 in 1729. In 1732-33 Goodison was furnishing new apartments fitted out for Frederick, Prince of Wales both at St James's Palace and at Hampton Court; among surviving furnishings for Hampton Court are a small pair of gilded mirrors carved with the Prince's plume of feathers and candle branches still hang in the Prince's Drawing Room and four gilded stands, "carved & Gilt Term fashion", on which female heads support Ionic capitals. At St James's there was "A large pier glass, in a tabernacle frame, gilt— £50"; the frame was of the familiar neo-Palladian architectural type. In the Prince's Dining Room at St James's stood Goodison's "mahogany commode chest of drawers, ornamented with carving and wrought brass handles to d^{o}, and lifting handles". When the Prince and Princess of Wales took up residence at Leicester House in the winter of 1742-43, Goodison was employed to make the initial inventory and survey An organ case probably delivered by Benjamoin Goodison for the Prince of Wales, ca 1745, was altered by William Vile, ca 1763 for the Prince's son, George III: it remains in the Royal Collection.

In his will, dated 29 May 1765, Goodison noted that the late Prince remained "indebted unto me in a considerable sum of money". For the Prince's funeral Goodison had hung the public mourning chambers in black and had supplied the Prince's coffin.

== Other patrons ==
Among the aristocracy, a major patron was Sarah, Duchess of Marlborough, who "employed him in her many houses" according to Earl Spencer. She had known him first as Moore's assistant at Blenheim Palace, where Moore had succeeded Sir John Vanbrugh in completing the interiors. She jotted down some notes 7 September 1719: "Benjamin Goodison. The name of Mr. Moore's man. Pray send for him see him hear... Mr. Wilson I desire you to pay to Benjamin Goodison the summ of five hundred pounds taking his hand for the fee received in for his master Mr. Moore your account of fourniture for the use of Blenheim." In July 1740 he was her agent in purchasing Lady Westmoreland's house in Dover Street, London, so advantageously that the Duchess made him a gift of twenty guineas. In order that the house be readied and fully furnished as a gift to the Duchess's daughter-in-law, Henry Flitcroft was commissioned to design alterations, and Goodison was employed with fitments and furnishings.

Another long-standing record of patronage was that of the first and second Viscounts Folkestone at Longford Castle, from 1736 to Goodison's successor in 1775. In 1739-40, the Gallery was furnished entirely by Goodison, who supplied the green damask for walls and furniture; the suite of mahogany stools and long stools, with two daybeds have gilded details and gilded fretwork applied over the upholstery. The total of Goodison's bills for the Gallery came to £1250. The candlestands in the form of therm figures with the head of Hercules supporting an Ionic capital in the Gallery are attributed to Goodison. A carved and painted side table from Longford Castle, with seated foxes at the front corners, now at the Victoria and Albert Museum may also be by Goodison.

Goodison was employed by Thomas Coke, 1st Earl of Leicester for furnishing Holkham, Norfolk, where surviving carved and gilded suites of chairs and tables are securely attributed to him, as well as the brass appliqués on the porphyry sideboard in the Dining Room, which was designed by the Palladian architect John Vardy. It is reasonable to assume that the long suite of 23 giltwood armchairs, 9 settees and 4 stools covered in crimson "Genoa" cut velvet was supplied by Goodison. Three further pieces at Holkham, a mahogany table-press "carv'd and gilt with wire doors" and a pair of card tables, perhaps recorded in a bill of 1757, and a kneehole writing- or dressing-table, were tentatively attributed to Goodison by Anthony Coleridge.

He was also employed by George Montagu, 4th Earl of Cardigan as he then was, in furnishing Deene Park, Northamptonshire and Dover House (Montagu House), Whitehall, London, where Henry Flitcroft was once more the architect in charge. His accounts, which range from 1739 to 1745, include chiefly picture frames, small items and repairs. Notably he provided in 1741 "a carved and gilt dolphin table frame to match another", which may not have been his.

Further patrons can be identified by their records of payments to Goodison, though they cannot be connected with surviving pieces; the Duke of Newcastle's payment in 1740 is entered in an account book conserved at the British Library. In May and July 1751 he provided Lady Monson with walnut elbow chairs covered in leather and brass nailed, with their checked linen loose covers, a dining table with a protective leather cover and eight walnut chairs, for a total of £22 2/6. Other stray references instance work at Althorp, Chatsworth, and in London at the Mansion House and Bedford House.

Like many prominent London furniture-makers, Goodison was prepared to rent grand chandeliers for special occasions. At Holkham in 1740 he charged a large sum "for the use of three chandelier Branch to burn lights in the Greenhouse for Mr. Coke's birthday."

Formerly many especially fine examples of Kentian carved side tables without provenance were attributed on the basis of style and quality to Goodison. Another London carver working in a similar Kentian idiom was John Boson, to whom a series of half-octagon back-to-back library tables formerly attributed to Goodison or William Vile are now ascribed, based on a documented pair commissioned from Boson in 1735, together with a pair of giltwood mirrors, by Lady Burlington for 'The Garden Room' which was situated between the old and the new Chiswick House.

== Personal life ==
He is probably the Benjamin Goodison who married Sarah Cooper at St Bride's, Fleet St, in 1723, and had several children christened at St Martin-in-the-Fields, including a son Benjamin, in 1735. The younger Benjamin Goodison, in partnership with Goodison's nephew Benjamin Parran, succeeded to the business until 1783.
