= Anthony Ashley-Cooper, Lord Ashley =

British Army officer (1900–1947)

Lord Ashley OStJ TD DL
- Ashley-Cooper in 1927
- Tenure: 1900–1947
- Other names: Lord Ashley
- Known for: Son of 9th Earl of Shaftesbury
- Born: 4 October 1900; Wimborne St Giles, Dorset, England
- Died: 8 March 1947 (aged 46); Wimborne St Giles, Dorset, England
- Locality: Dorset
- Spouses: Sylvia Ashley (m. 1927; div. 1934) Françoise Soulier (m. 1937)
- Issue: Anthony Ashley-Cooper, 10th Earl of Shaftesbury

Anthony Ashley-Cooper, Lord Ashley, OStJ, TD, DL (4 October 1900 – 8 March 1947), was a British Army officer. As the eldest son of Anthony Ashley-Cooper, 9th Earl of Shaftesbury (his mother was Shaftesbury's wife Lady Constance Sibell Grosvenor), he used the courtesy title "Lord Ashley".

== Family life ==
Ashley was married first to Sylvia Hawkes. They were married on 3 February 1927 and divorced on 28 November 1934. Lord Ashley shocked London society by marrying Hawkes, an English model and actress from the chorus line. They were divorced after she began an affair with the American actor Douglas Fairbanks Sr. who was named as co-respondent in the petition for divorce.

Lord Ashley's second wife was the French-born Françoise Soulier (1914–1999), the daughter of Georges Soulier of Caudebec-en-Caux, France. Lord Ashley and Soulier were married on 31 March 1937 and remained married until his death in 1947. Their two children were:

- Anthony Ashley-Cooper, 10th Earl of Shaftesbury (22 May 1938 – c. 5 November 2004)
- Lady Frances Mary Elizabeth Ashley-Cooper (born 9 April 1940).

Lord Ashley was heir apparent to the earldom of Shaftesbury throughout his life. On 8 November 1943, his father appointed him a deputy lieutenant of Dorset. However, at age 46, Ashley died unexpectedly of heart disease before his father, making his son, also named Anthony Ashley-Cooper, heir apparent, inheriting the earldom in 1961 upon the death of his grandfather, the 9th Earl of Shaftesbury.

== Military service ==
Lord Ashley was a cadet in the Eton College contingent of the Officers' Training Corps. He was commissioned a second lieutenant in the 94th (Dorset & Somersetshire Yeomanry) Field Brigade, Royal Artillery, on 26 June 1925. On 1 May 1926, he transferred to the Royal Wiltshire Yeomanry with the same rank. Lord Ashley was promoted to lieutenant on 12 March 1929. Soon after, on 25 May 1929, he was seconded away from the regiment to serve, from 19 August, as an aide-de-camp to Sir Frederick Sykes, Governor of Bombay, and restored to the establishment on 19 April 1930. He was restored to his unit on 2 May 1931. Lord Ashley was promoted to captain on 26 June 1937, and to major on 5 March 1938. On 5 January 1940, he was removed from the Wiltshire Yeomanry and placed on the general list of Yeomanry officers.

Major Lord Ashley was transferred to the Intelligence Corps on 22 July 1940, having requested to serve as a captain during World War II. He served with the Auxiliary Units, which were highly covert Resistance groups trained to engage and counteract the expected invasion of the United Kingdom by Nazi Germany. Members of the Auxiliary Unit were stationed in covert hidden bunkers scattered throughout Great Britain. While Major Lord Ashley was trained at Coleshill House near Highworth, Wiltshire, specific details regarding his assignments and operational base remain classified.

On 18 December 1941, he was transferred to the Territorial Army reserve of officers for the Royal Armoured Corps, Royal Tank Regiment. He was posthumously awarded the Efficiency Decoration in 1947.

== Order of St John ==
On 24 December 1943, Lord Ashley was appointed an Officer of the Order of St John (OStJ).
