= Jamila M'Barek =

French-born Tunisian murderer (b. c. 1961)

- Born: c. 1961 (age 64–65); Lens, Pas-de-Calais, France
- Criminal charge: Murder of the 10th Earl of Shaftesbury
- Criminal penalty: 25 years in prison, reduced to 20 years in prison
- Criminal status: Released
- Spouse(s): Raf Schouten (m. 19??; div. 20??) the 10th Earl of Shaftesbury (m. 2002; died 2004)
- Children: 2

Jamila Ashley-Cooper, Dowager Countess of Shaftesbury (née M'Barek), is the French-born Tunisian widow and murderer of the 10th Earl of Shaftesbury, a British peer, and was imprisoned for having paid her brother to murder her husband.

== Background ==
Born circa 1961, she was one of seven children born in Lens, Pas-de-Calais, France, to immigrant parents, a Tunisian mother and a Moroccan father. The children were abused by their violent and alcoholic father who worked as a miner.

When Jamila M'Barek was six years old, her mother fled with her and her six siblings to Nabeul, Tunisia, in order to escape from their abusive father. M'Barek spent most of her childhood there. M'Barek moved to Switzerland in her early twenties and then to Paris, where she has claimed she studied acting.

At the age of 17, M'Barek moved to Saint-Tropez where she married her first husband, Dutch businessman Raf Schouten, by whom she had two children. The first marriage ended in divorce in the early 2000s.

According to her ex-husband, Raf Schouten, M'Barek often went by the name "Sarah" and her children knew her by that name. Schouten believes M'Barek worked as a prostitute even during their short, unhappy marriage. She rarely saw her children, who in 2006 lived on the French Riviera with their paternal grandmother.

In 1993, M'Barek posed nude in Playboy magazine. She later worked for an escort agency on the French Riviera and was looking for a permanent arrangement with one of her wealthy clients after her recent divorce when, under the name 'Sarah', she met the twice-divorced Anthony Ashley-Cooper, 10th Earl of Shaftesbury, in late 2001. Catherine Gurtler, a former madam from Paris who sent M'Barek to Lord Shaftesbury, later testified that she had asked for rich clients and she "saw plenty of big-name celebrities during her days working for the agency". According to Gurtler, she hoped to settle down with an affluent and famous man.

== Marriage to Lord Shaftesbury ==
M'Barek and Lord Shaftesbury were married at Hilversum in the Netherlands on 5 November 2002. The wedding was first scheduled for spring 2002, but Shaftesbury "felt something was not right". To the disappointment of his family, he became infatuated with M'Barek, buying her a flat in Cannes for £500,000 (£930,000 in present-day terms) and transferring other properties into her name after they married.

M'Barek, by this point titled Countess of Shaftesbury, claimed to be pregnant with his child; Shaftesbury included her in his will, naming her the heir of his properties in Ireland and France, but a child was never born to the couple. During her trial, she claimed that she had had an abortion due to Shaftesbury's alcoholism, but the magistrate said that the pregnancy had never occurred.

By April 2004, Lord Shaftesbury had started a new relationship with Nadia Orche, a young mother of two children who has been described as a "club hostess from Cannes" and a "Moroccan prostitute". According to Orche, Lord Shaftesbury was planning to marry her after getting a divorce from his third wife.

Lord and Lady Shaftesbury separated in April 2004 and divorce proceedings were set in motion. By that time, he had given her a windmill in the Gers region of southwestern France, the €700,000 duplex in a villa in Cannes, which included staff, a car, and a monthly allowance, ranging between €7,500 and €10,000. Lord Shaftesbury wanted to end this arrangement and the marriage so he could marry Orche. While Shaftesbury was speaking with his wife, a fight broke out between him and his brother-in-law, Mohammed M'Barek. Shaftesbury died during the fight when his brother-in-law strangled him, breaking his neck.

== Confession and arrest ==
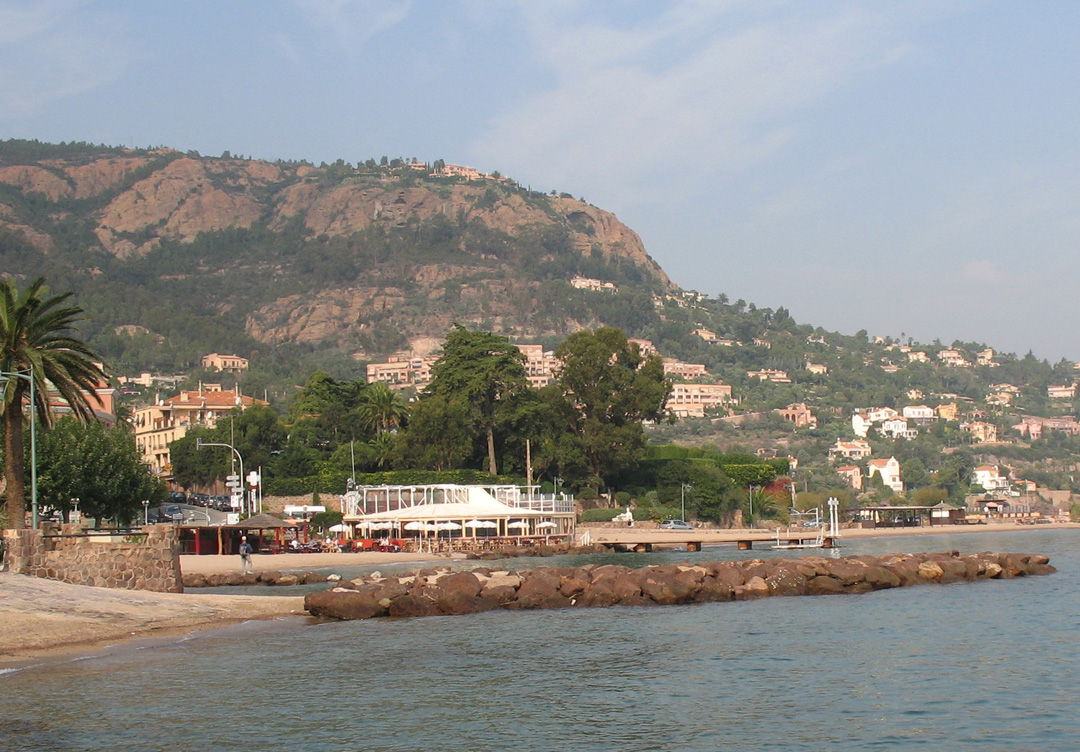
Théoule-sur-Mer in France, where the body of the 10th Earl of Shaftesbury was found

In February 2005, Lady Shaftesbury was admitted to a psychiatric hospital, where she had an emotional breakdown and began confessing to her involvement in her husband's death. When interviewed by police, she claimed that Shaftesbury had been beaten to death by her brother during a fight at her flat in Cannes.

According to Lady Shaftesbury, her brother placed her husband's body in the boot of his BMW and left it in an unknown place. She was arrested on 25 February 2005 and her brother was arrested by German police the following day at his home in Munich. He was later extradited to France, continuing to deny his involvement and knowledge of the location of Lord Shaftesbury's body.

On 7 April 2005, a body in an advanced state of decomposition was discovered by the French authorities in a valley at Théoule-sur-Mer, Alpes-Maritimes, on the outskirts of Cannes.

In June 2006, pre-trial proceedings began in Grasse. Lady Shaftesbury told the court that she was not with her brother when he disposed of the body. She stated that she had never been to the site and claimed that she had no role in the murder other than helping her brother, under duress, load the body into his car. She told investigators, "I did not want him to die. I just wanted my brother to intimidate him so that he would continue to pay me my allowance. But he didn't want to have anything to do with it, so a violent quarrel broke out. I left the room because I could not stand to see what was happening".

== Trial ==
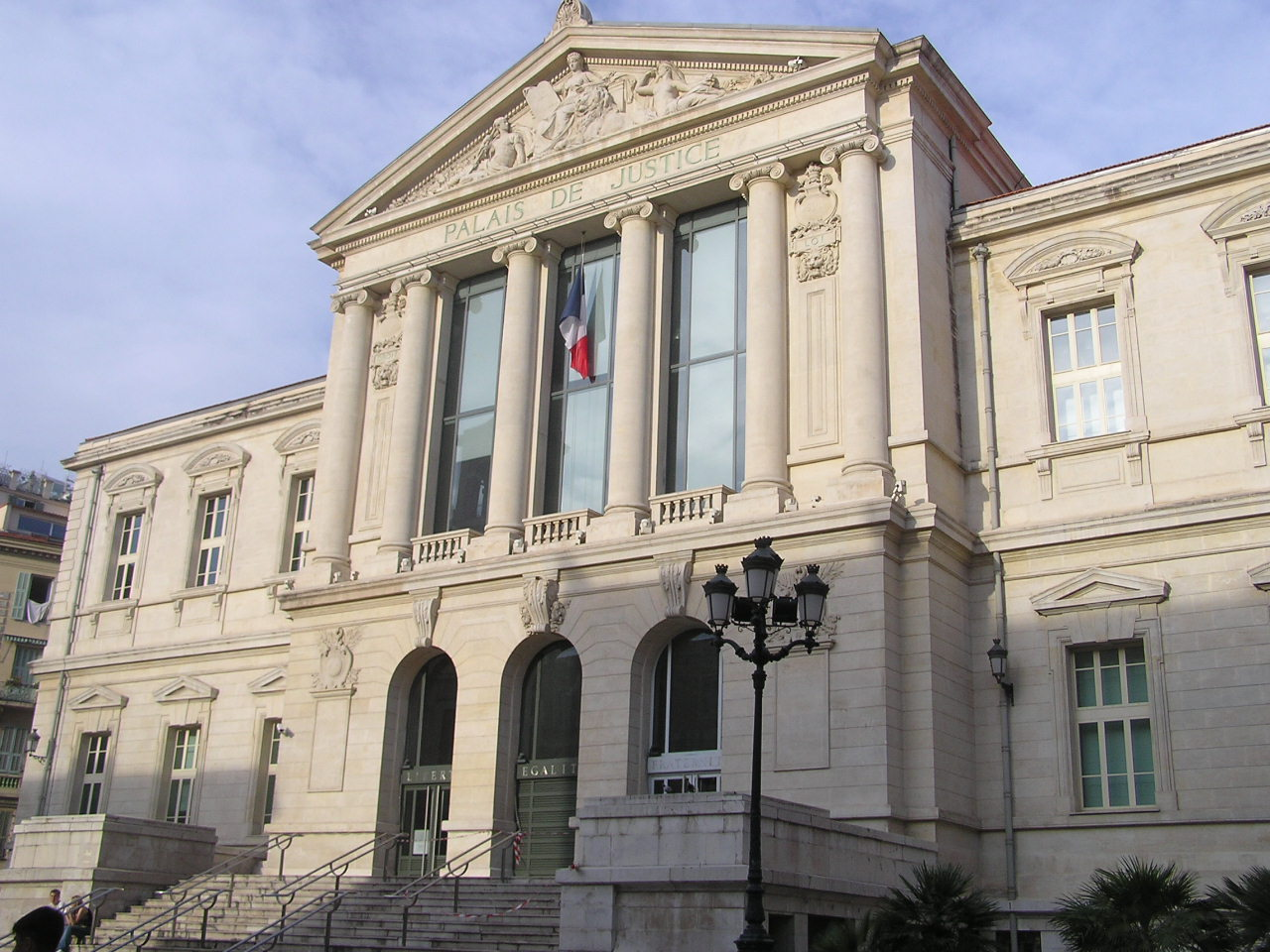
Palais de Justice de Nice; Court Hall in Nice, France

On 22 May 2007, the trial of Jamila, Countess of Shaftesbury, and her brother, Mohammed M'Barek, opened at the Palais de Justice in Nice, two-and-a-half years after the death of the 10th Earl of Shaftesbury. The presiding judge of the jury trial was Nicole Besset, with Jean-Louis Moreau serving as the state prosecutor. The Countess of Shaftesbury was represented in court by her attorney, Franck De Vita.

A forensic examination of the skeletal remains revealed injuries, including a broken ankle and a double fracture to the larynx, which indicated strangulation. At times, both Lady Shaftesbury and her brother had admitted their involvement in the death of Lord Shaftesbury, and the French authorities decided to charge both her and her brother with the crime of premeditated murder. Fearing that her Arab ancestry might alienate the jury, the defendant demanded to be referred to by the titles she had gained when she married Shaftesbury, much to the dismay of his family.

=== Magistrate's investigative report ===
The trial began with a presentation of the investigative report, which was read to the court by Jean-Louis Moreau, the state prosecutor. The report described Lady Shaftesbury as "an escort girl who loved the high life" who "chose the life of a kept woman, with multiple affairs with men she chose for their bank accounts and their assets". After marrying Lord Shaftesbury, she faced "looming financial disaster" in the event of a divorce and set out "consciously and without constraint, to accomplish his assassination". Refusing to be dissuaded from her desired inheritance, she continued to maintain her belief throughout the trial that she was entitled to a share of her late husband's £6 million fortune, including the family estate at Wimborne St Giles.

=== Defence statements ===
Lady Shaftesbury discounted the investigative report and stated that her marriage to Lord Shaftesbury "was a curse", describing her husband as "a loner" who "had no friends" which is why "he drank a lot". She portrayed him as a "violent, sex-crazed alcoholic, hooked on cocaine". She freely admitted that her brother had indeed killed her husband but testified it was an accident. Her brother presented a similar defence.

There was blood on the floor. I did not know if it was my brother or my husband's blood. My brother could not believe my husband was dead. —Jamila M'Barek

She further admitted that after her husband was dead, she helped her brother load his body into the trunk of his black BMW. She prefaced this admission with additional claims.

He forced me to put the body in the boot of the car. He forced me to follow him as I thought we were going to a hospital. Then he asked me to go away.

—Jamila M'Barek

The French authorities suspected there had been a conspiracy to murder Shaftesbury when they discovered that his widow transferred €150,000 into her brother's bank account the week following her husband's disappearance. The prosecution viewed this as payment for services rendered, although Lady Shaftesbury testified that she had given her brother the money in order for him to buy a house for their ailing mother.

In her defence, she denied any financial motive in wishing her husband dead and claimed that she had no need of his fortune, stating that she had "always been prosperous". She testified that the source of her prosperity was the generosity of wealthy individuals who were prepared to pay for her company. Lady Shaftesbury, who claimed to be "extremely close" to Prince Albert II of Monaco, named two American actors, George Clooney and Bruce Willis, as well as Swedish former tennis player Björn Borg as her former clients.

All three men denied meeting her and declined to attend court to comment on her allegations or serve as character witnesses. Lady Shaftesbury vowed revenge, additionally stating, "I was always loyal to the men who were close to me, but they did not want to know me when I was facing the biggest trial of my life. Most were too scared to appear because they are married or have steady girlfriends but with their help I could have been cleared". Lady Shaftesbury added that her arguments with her husband had nothing to do with money, but rather arose as a result of his excessive sexual demands, reportedly brought on by injections of testosterone. Throughout the trial, her lawyer, Franck De Vita, continued to declare her innocence. "I am convinced Jamila will walk free".

=== Conviction and sentencing ===
The strongest evidence presented by the prosecution was a secretly recorded telephone conversation between the defendant and her sister, Naima, in which Jamila discussed £100,000 (€150,000) paid to her brother, allegedly his fee for contract killing. She additionally recounted precisely how she was going to blame her brother for her husband's death.

The wiretap uncovered the truth regarding her visit to the remote spot where her husband's body was found. This was supported when downloaded records from the GPS tracking device in her cellphone detailed the presence of her cellphone there, two days before Lord Shaftesbury's death.

On 25 May 2007, after deliberating for two hours, the jury returned guilty verdicts against both brother and sister. Lady Shaftesbury and her brother were each sentenced to 25 years in prison. Under French law, they had an automatic right to appeal their conviction, which results in a retrial of the case; and on 4 February 2009, Lady Shaftesbury appeared in a court in Aix-en-Provence to appeal her conviction. After the jury deliberated for four hours, her sentence was reduced from 25 to 20 years.
