= Somerset Trained Bands =

Auxiliary military force in Somerset

- Active: 1558–1662
- Country: England
- Branch: Trained Bands
- Role: Infantry and Cavalry
- Size: 5–6 Regiments of Foot, 1 Regiment of Horse
- Engagements: Rising of the North; Battle of Newburn; Battle of Marshall's Elm; Siege of Sherborne Castle; Battle of Braddock Down; Second Battle of Modbury; Siege of Lyme Regis; Battle of Lostwithiel; Sieges of Taunton; Battle of Langport; Siege of Bristol (1645)

Commanders
- Notable commanders: Lt-Col Thomas Lunsford; Sir Edward Rodney; Sir John Stawell; Col William Strode

The Somerset Trained Bands were a part-time military force in the county of Somerset in South West England from 1558 until they were reconstituted as the Somerset Militia in 1662. They were periodically embodied for home defence, for example in the army mustered at Tilbury during the Armada Campaign of 1588. They fought of the Battle of Newburn in the Second Bishops' War and their units saw considerable active service for both sides during the English Civil War.

== Origin ==
The English militia was descended from the Anglo-Saxon Fyrd, the military force raised from the freemen of the shires under command of their Sheriff. It continued under the Norman kings, and was reorganised under the Assizes of Arms of 1181 and 1252, and again by King Edward I's Statute of Winchester of 1285.

The legal basis of the militia was updated by two acts of 1557 covering musters (4 & 5 Ph. & M. c. 3) and the maintenance of horses and armour (4 & 5 Ph. & M. c. 2) under the Lord Lieutenant, assisted by the Deputy Lieutenants and Justices of the Peace (JPs). The entry into force of these Acts in 1558 is seen as the starting date for the formal county militia in England. In that year Somerset had an organised regiment of 1000 men in 10 companies, each under a nominated captain and 'petty captain'. In 1569 the Somerset contingent joined the force assembled against the Rising of the North. Although the militia obligation was universal, this assembly confirmed that it was impractical to train and equip every able-bodied man, so after 1572 the practice was to select a proportion of men for the Trained Bands, who were mustered for regular training (the 1558 regiment in Somerset was an early example of this).

== Spanish War ==
The Armada Crisis in 1588 led to the mobilisation of the trained bands and out of 12,000 able-bodied men Somerset furnished 4000 armed and trained, with 50 lancers, 250 light horsemen, and 60 'petronels' (the petronel was an early cavalry firearm), with in addition 1000 untrained 'pioneers'. The trained footmen were organised into five regiments, each of 400 'shot' and musketeers, 280 'Corslets' (body armour, signifying pikemen) and 120 billmen, under the command of:

- George Sydenham
- Sir Henry Berkeley
- Sir John Stowell
- Sir John Clyfton
- Arthur Hopton

The county sent off 600 men to join Queen Elizabeth I's bodyguard, and in July the whole contingent marched to join the royal army at Tilbury, where the Queen gave her Tilbury speech on 9 August.

In the 16th Century little distinction was made between the militia and the troops levied by the counties for overseas expeditions. However, in 1590 the commissioners of musters in Somerset wrote to the secretary of state saying that they had been advised by lawyers that their commissions to levy men were invalid, except in time of rebellion or invasion. Nevertheless, between 1585 and 1602 Somerset supplied 1194 men for service in Ireland, 1200 for France, and 460 for the Netherlands. The counties usually conscripted the unemployed and criminals rather than send the trained bandsmen. The men were given coats and money to conduct them to the ports of embarkation. Coat and conduct money was recovered from the government, but replacing the weapons issued to the levies from the militia armouries was a heavy cost on the counties.

== Bishops' Wars ==
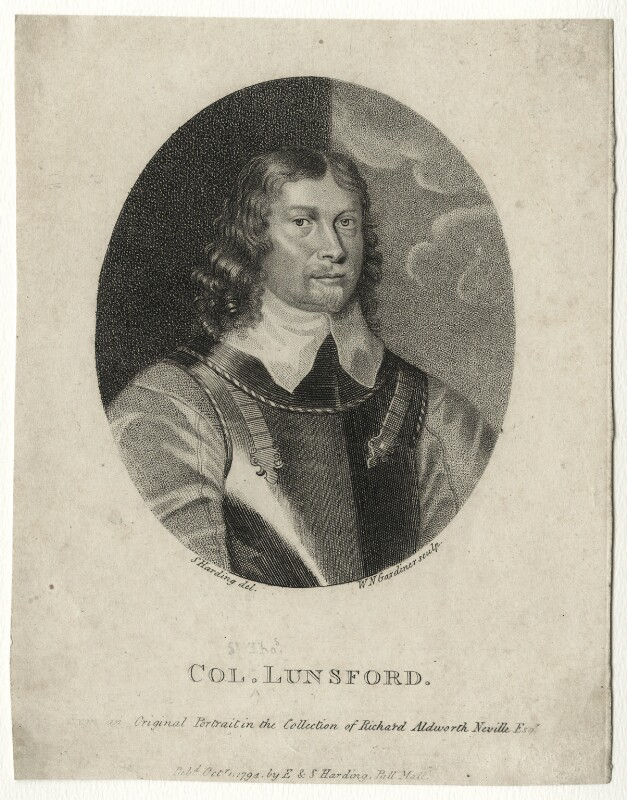
Thomas Lunsford

With the passing of the threat of invasion, the trained bands declined in the early 17th Century. Later, King Charles I attempted to reform them into a national force or 'Perfect Militia' answering to the king rather than local control. The Somerset Trained Bands of 1638 consisted of 4000 men armed with 2403 muskets and 1597 corslets; they also mustered 82 Cuirassiers and 218 Harquebusiers.

=== Battle of Newburn ===
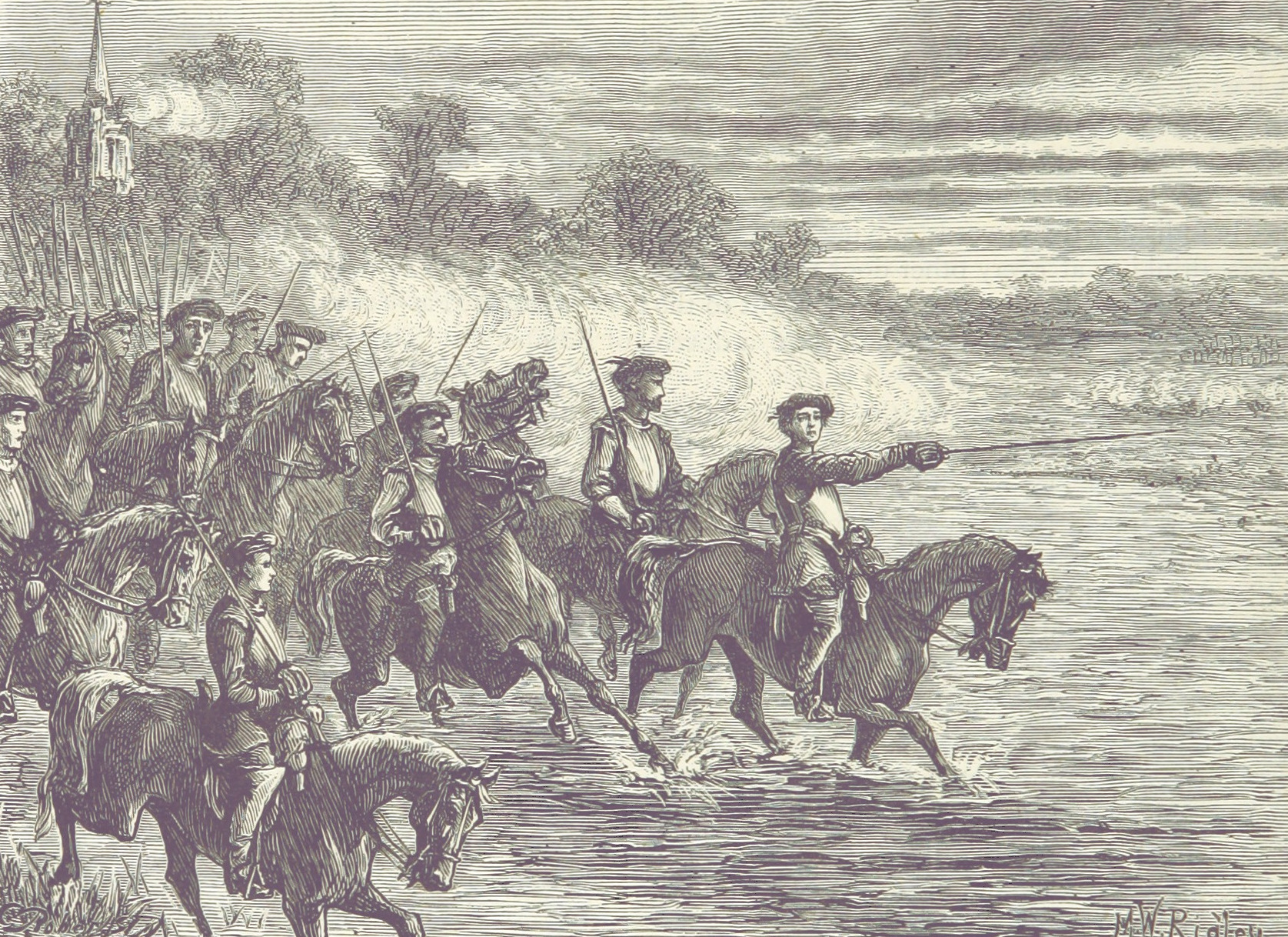
The Battle of Newburn

Somerset was ordered to send 2000 men overland to Newcastle upon Tyne for the Second Bishops' War of 1640. However, substitution was rife and many of those sent on this unpopular service would have been untrained replacements and conscripts. Like many other contingents, the Somerset men were disorderly, complaining about pay, food and conditions. As his regiment passed through Warwickshire, Lieutenant-Colonel Thomas Lunsford and his officers admitted that they had killed some of their men in self-defence. Sir John Beaumont's regiment, conscripted in Somerset, Bristol, and Wiltshire, marauded through Derbyshire, attacking the property of unpopular landowners, and were accused of being 'West Country clownes'.

At the Battle of Newburn, roughly 800 raw Somerset musketeers under Lunsford were holding two hurriedly-erected breastworks or 'sconces' on the south side of the River Tyne. Around 300 Scottish cavalry made a probe across the fordable river and were driven off by the concentrated fire of the musketeers. The Scots then began an intense cannonade of the sconces with their superior artillery. Although Lunsford kept his men in their defences for a while, they eventually broke and ran, many throwing away their weapons, and their gunpowder store blew up. The Scottish cannon and cavalry drove back a counter-attack by English cavalry, and they crossed the river. By early evening the whole Royal army was in full retreat to Newcastle and shortly afterwards the King had to concede a settlement with the Scots.

== Civil Wars ==
Control of the militia was one of the areas of dispute between Charles I and Parliament that led to the English Civil War. When open war broke out between the King and Parliament, neither side made much use of the trained bands beyond securing the county armouries for their own full-time troops; some trained bands were used as garrison troops, only a few as field regiments. The Somerset Trained Bands split between the two parties. Armed with the King's Commission of Array, Sir Ralph Hopton, Member of Parliament for Wells, raised the TBs there in July 1642, but when he rode into Shepton Mallet with a company of horse on 1 August and attempted to call out the TBs there, he was confronted by William Strode, MP for Ilchester, who claimed authority over the trained bands under Parliament's Militia Ordinance. A street fight broke out, Hopton and the Royalist supporters were chased out of town and shortly afterwards the whole county. The Somerset TBs divided as follows:

- Royalist:
  - Lord Paulet's Somerset Trained Band: commanded by John Poulett, 1st Baron Poulett (or Paulet). Paulet had commanded 800 men in June 1642, but he was a committed Royalist and the men followed Lt-Col John Pyne, MP, into the Parliamentarian army.
  - Sir Edward Rodney's Somerset Trained Band: commanded by Sir Edward Rodney, Hopton's colleague as MP for Wells. Hopton mustered the regiment in July 1642 and it took part in a skirmish at Wells in August. After the Parliamentarians overran Somerset following the Siege of Sherborne Castle in September, Rodney was probably replaced by a Parliamentarian, possibly Col William Strode. However, Rodney appears to have been reinstated following the Royalist victories of 1643 and the regiment took part in the Battle of Lostwithiel (August–September 1644) and the subsequent Siege of Taunton (September–December). In March 1645 it formed the garrison of Wells, and it was probably part of the garrison of Bristol when it was besieged and captured (August–September 1645).
  - Sir John Stawell's Somerset Trained Band: commanded by Sir John Stawell, MP for Somerset, the regiment may have been present at the capture of Taunton in June 1643 and the Siege of Lyme Regis (April–June 1644). Afterwards it was besieged in Taunton in July 1644, and fought at the Battle of Langport in July 1645. It was in the besieged garrison of Bristol, armed solely with muskets, from August to September 1645, when a detachment was in Windmill Fort.
  - Sir Edward Berkeley's Somerset Trained Band: commanded by Sir Edward Berkeley, who was captured in October 1642.
  - Somerset Trained Band Horse: Lt-Col Edward Dyer of the Somerset TB Horse was captured by Parliament at the fall of Bridgwater; he was later colonel of his own regiment of horse for the Royalists, which may have been based on the TB Horse.
- Parliamentarian:
  - Colonel William Strode's Somerset Trained Band: commanded by Strode after he chased Hopton out of Shepton Mallet, it served in the successful Parliamentary Siege of Sherborne Castle in September. It was later converted into a full-time Parliamentarian regiment: it is not clear whether its participation in the Battle of Braddock Down in January 1643 and the Second Battle of Modbury in February was as TBs or Regulars. Strode's Foot subsequently served through the long Siege of Plymouth.
  - Bath Trained Band: commanded by Sir Alexander Popham, MP for Bath. After serving in the Siege of Sherborne in September 1642, its weapons were taken in 1643 to arm Popham's Regiment of Foot for Parliament.
  - Colonel John Pyne's Somerset Trained Band: formerly Paulett's (see above). In August 1642 the regiment (about 500 strong) was routed at the Battle of Marshall's Elm by a Royalist force commanded by Henry Lunsford (Thomas's brother) , John Digby, Lord Hawley and Sir John Stawell. However, it took part in the Siege of Sherborne in September and was still active at the Second Battle of Modbury in February 1643.

As Parliament tightened its grip on the country after winning the First Civil War it reorganised the militia to counterbalance the power of the Army. New Militia Acts in 1648 and 1650 replaced lords lieutenant with county commissioners appointed by Parliament or the Council of State. The establishment of The Protectorate saw Oliver Cromwell take control of the militia as a paid force to support his Rule by Major-Generals. From now on the term 'Trained Band' began to be replaced by 'Militia'. On 15 February 1650 commissions were issued for the field officers (colonels, lt-colonels and majors) of the reorganised Somerset Militia (two regiments each of horse and foot), including Sir Alexander Popham as a Colonel of Horse

== Somerset Militia ==
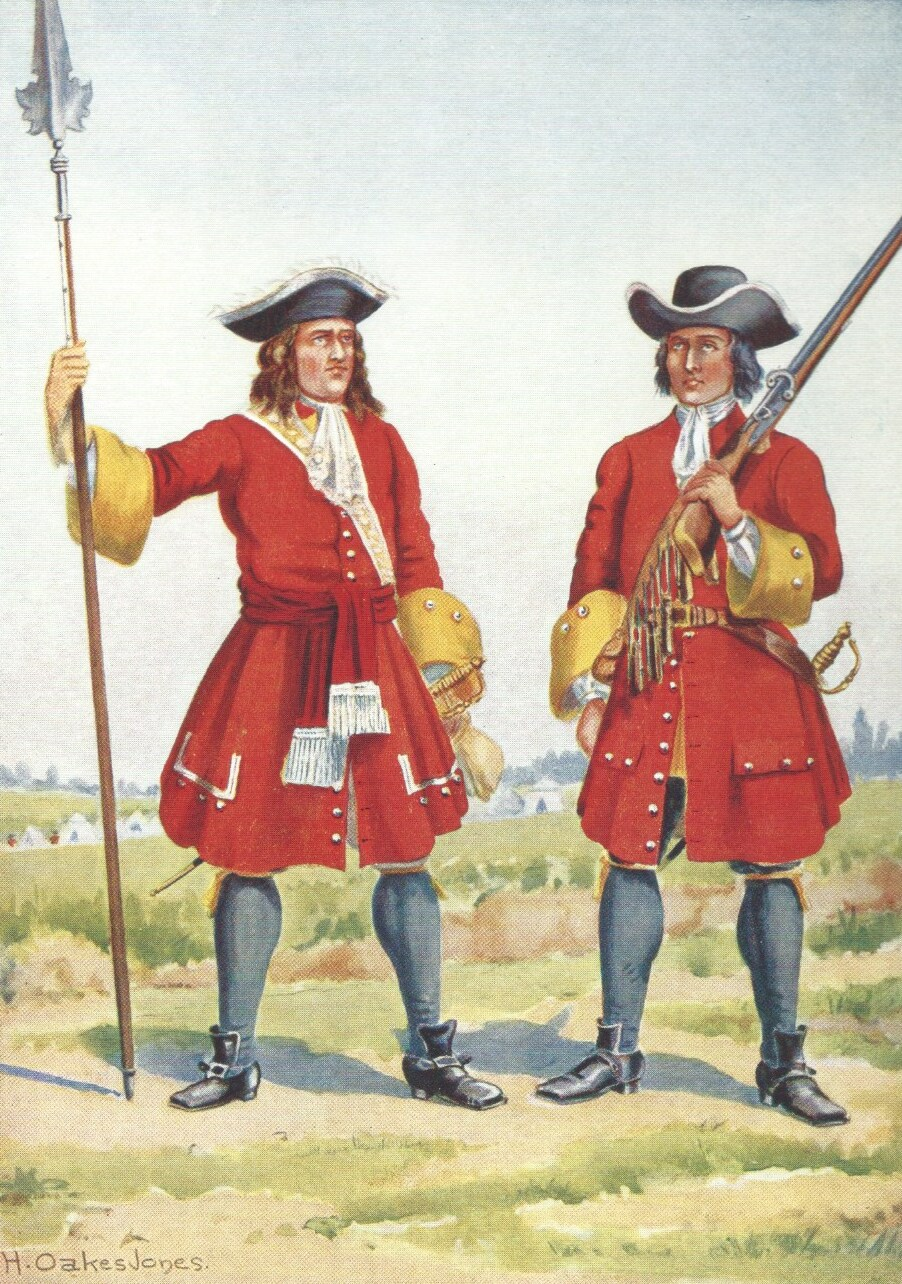
A sergeant and private of the Somerset Militia in 1685

Following the Stuart Restoration, the English Militia was re-established by the Militia Act 1661 under the control of the king's lords-lieutenant, the men to be selected by ballot. This was popularly seen as the 'Constitutional Force' to counterbalance a 'Standing Army' tainted by association with the New Model Army that had supported Cromwell's military dictatorship, and almost the whole burden of home defence and internal security was entrusted to the militia. The militia was reformed in 1662 and by 1679 the Somerset Militia once again consisted of five regiments of foot and one of horse. In 1685 it was heavily engaged in the Monmouth Rebellion.

== Uniforms and insignia ==
The mounted 'petronels' of the Elizabethan Somerset Trained Bands wore coats of a uniform colour, and the footmen of the period usually wore blue cassocks and red caps. A wide range of uniform colours was used during the Civil Wars. By 1650 red coats were becoming standard.
