= Sir Anthony Ashley, 1st Baronet =

English politician

Sir Anthony Ashley
- 1st Baronet of Wimborne St Giles
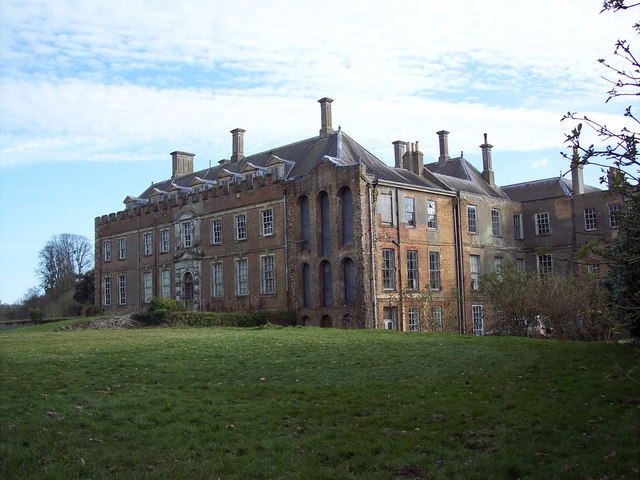
- Tenure: 3 July 1622 – 13 January 1628
- Born: 1551
- Died: 13 January 1628
- Residence: Ashley Manor
- Locality: Wimborne St Giles
- Wars and battles: Capture of Cádiz; Drake–Norris Expedition
- Offices: Clerk of the Privy Council
- Spouses: Jane Okeover (1592–1620); Philippa Sheldon (1622–1628)
- Issue: Anne Elizabeth Ashley (1593–1628)
- Parents: Anthony Ashley of Damerham; Dorothy Lyte of Lytes Cary

Sir Anthony Ashley, 1st Baronet, PC (1551 – 13 January 1628) was Clerk of the Privy Council, which was the most senior civil servant in the Privy Council Office. Ashley accompanied the fleet to Cádiz as a representative of the Queen. He distinguished himself by the capture of Cádiz and was knighted by Robert Devereux, 2nd Earl of Essex at Cádiz after the capture of the city. Ashley sat in several parliaments, and was highly distinguished by favour of Queen Elizabeth I of England.

Ashley was the older brother of Robert Ashley, founder of Middle Temple Library (1565–1641) and Sir Francis Ashley of Dorchester (1569–1635). Sir Francis was the father-in-law of Denzil Holles, 1st Baron Holles, one of five members of the Long Parliament whom King Charles I attempted to arrest in 1642. Sir Anthony Ashley inherited the family estates at Wimborne St Giles on his cousin, Sir Henry Ashley III's death.

== Ashley family ==
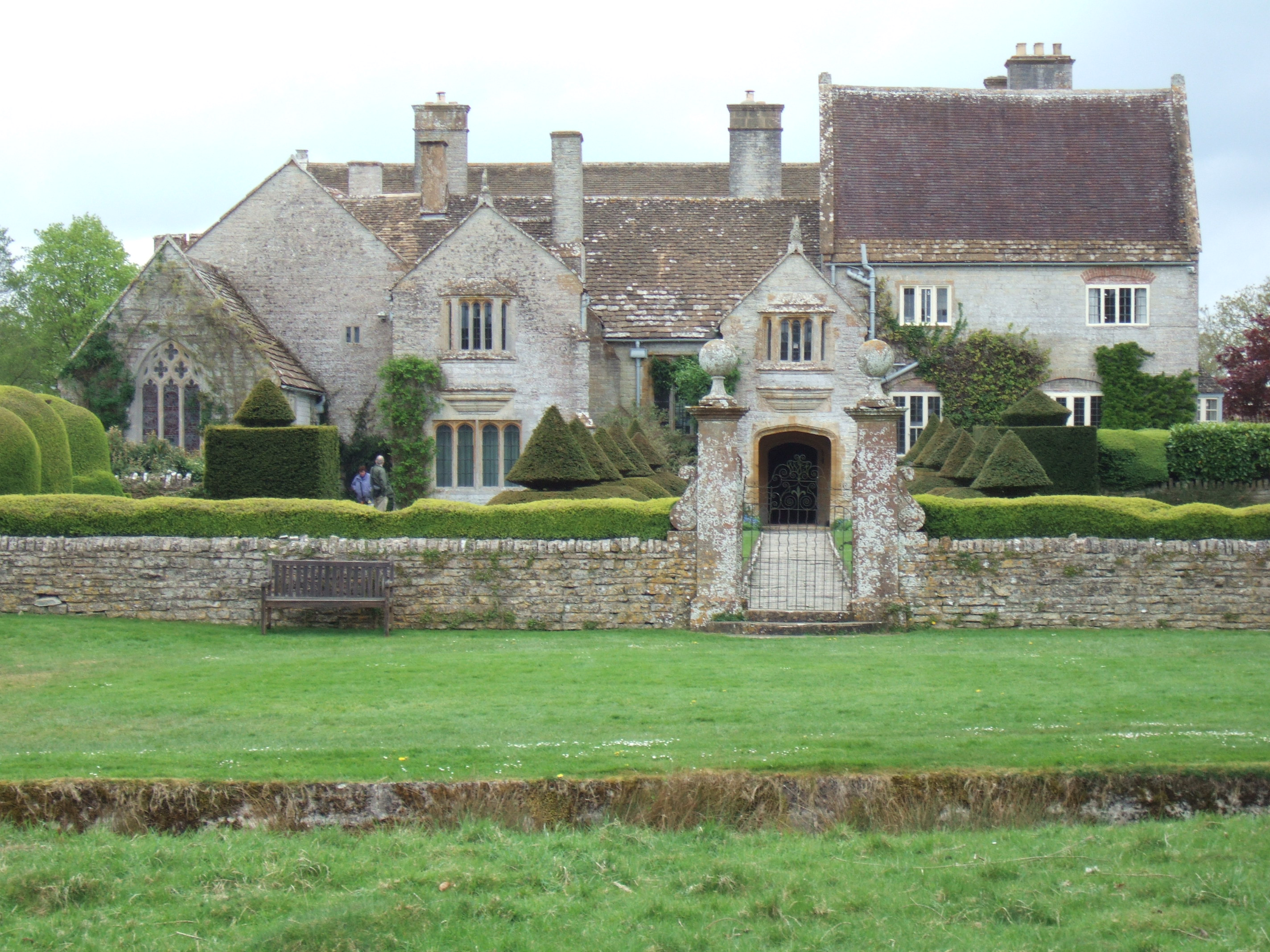
Lytes Cary, Somerset in 2009

The first known Ashleys originally came from Wiltshire, England, where they were lords of the manor of Ashley, at a very early period. Benedict of Ashley was born around the year 1260 in Ashley Place of Wiltshire in England. He lived during the reigns of King Henry II and King Edward I. In ancient and medieval times, the concept of surnames as we know them today was not very well developed. An individual either took the name of the village in which he lived (this would generally be the case for those starting with a "de"), or a derivative of his father's name, in the form of "fils de" (son of). The Ashley surname is taken from the name of the ancient ancestral homeland of Ashley in Wiltshire.

There were only a few castles and churches built in the 11th century. Most were built out of wood and consisted of a simple organic materials. Few from the time of Benedict survive today. The name of Benedict Ashley was recorded in medieval times, simply as the great-great-grandfather of Robert Ashley, who was the first Ashley to reside in Wimborne St Giles. He was the fifth great grandfather of Anthony Ashley-Cooper, 1st Earl of Shaftesbury.

Robert Ashley was married to Egidia Hamelyn, daughter of Sir John Hamelyn. Through this marriage, Ashley greatly increased his wealth, which included the ownership of a large family manor in Wimborne St Giles, East Dorset. Ashley thrived, expanding his land and holdings under King Henry IV of England. Ashley's two immediate successors, his son, Edmund Ashley (born c. 1425), and grandson, Hugh Ashley (born c. 1460), flourished as well. When Hugh Ashley died 29 April 1493, his estates transferred to his eldest son, Sir Henry Ashley I.

- Sir Henry Ashley I was married to Radegan Gilbert, daughter of Robert Gilbert of Somerset. Together, they had two sons, Henry II (his heir) and Anthony of Damerham. When Sir Henry Ashley I died on 1 March 1549, his son Henry II inherited the estate at Wimborne St Giles.
- Sir Henry Ashley II was married to Catherine Bassett, sister of Anne Bassett, both daughters of Sir John Bassett and Honor Grenville, Viscountess Lisle. Sir Henry II was knighted at the coronation of Queen Mary and appointed ranger of Alice Holt Forest. He was succeeded by his son, Henry Ashley III, who was gentleman pensioner to Queen Elizabeth.
- Sir Henry Ashley III died without heirs, and the family estates passed to Sir Henry's cousin, Sir Anthony Ashley of Wimborne St Giles.

Sir Anthony Ashley of Wimborne St Giles was the son of Sir Anthony Ashley of Damerham and Dorothy Lyte of Lytes Cary in Somerset, the sister of botanist Henry Lyte.

== Public life ==
Anthony Ashley was not born or raised expecting to inherit. His passion and pursuits focused on public employment. For many years, he had enriched himself in government service in support of the crown. He had served as Clerk of the Privy Council (1584–1609), He Served as M.P for Tavistock, in 1588 . and in 1589, he accompanied the failed Drake–Norris Expedition, against Portugal as Royal Commissioner.

At Oxford, with seventeen others, Ashley received the Degree of M.A. On the Queen's Visit, 27 Sept 1592.

=== Capture of Cádiz ===
Ashley was Secretary of War for the capture of Cádiz. He was knighted in June 1596, with others, by the Lords General of the expedition.

Ashley sat in several parliaments and was distinguished by the favour of Queen Elizabeth. In April 1596, Spanish regiments took the town of Calais from French Huguenots, which geographically offered an advantageous place from which to prepare for an invasion of the British Isles. Before dawn of the imminent Spanish invasion, Queen Elizabeth ordered the attack on the Spanish fleet anchored at Cádiz.

East Dorset noblemen and regular soldiers were commissioned by the monarch to supply troops, raising their quotas by indenture from a variety of sources. A Commission of Array was used to raise troops for a foreign expedition during this time, while various Militia Acts directed that (in theory) the entire male population who owned property and lands over a certain amount in value, was required to keep arms at home and periodically train or report to musters. The musters were usually chaotic affairs, used mainly by the William Paulet, 3rd Marquess of Winchester, Lord Lieutenant of Dorset and other officers to draw their pay and allowances, while the troops used the musters as an excuse for drinks after their military drills.

On 13 June 1596 the English fleet set sail from Plymouth to Cádiz. Charles Howard, 1st Earl of Nottingham was the admiral commanding the English fleet, while the landing forces were under the command of Robert Devereux, 2nd Earl of Essex, Lord Thomas Howard, Sir Walter Raleigh, Sir Francis Vere, Sir Conyers Clifford, and Sir George Carew, each commanding a squad. The proceedings of the generals and councils were recorded for the Queen by Anthony Ashley, who as Clerk of the Privy Council, was the most senior civil servant in the Privy Council Office. Ashley accompanied the fleet to Cádiz as a representative of the Queen. Ashley distinguished himself by the capture of Cádiz and was knighted by Essex at Cádiz after the capture of the city.

While some of the 1st Earl of Shaftesbury's biographers have made the mistake of claiming that Sir Anthony Ashley served as "Secretary to the Council of War" to Queen Elizabeth, there was no such office in those days. However, Ashley did serve as Secretary to the Privy Council during the reign of King James I.

== Imprisonment for embezzlement ==
After his return in August, Sir Gelli Meyrick, a Welsh supporter of Robert Devereux, 2nd Earl of Essex, and conspirator in Essex's rebellion was officially reported to have smuggled home some prize India hides. Sir Anthony Ashley brought charges against Meyrick of pilfering in connection with the goods captured from the enemy. He retaliated by accusing Ashley of far more serious offenses. On his return home, Ashley was charged with embezzlement, was imprisoned, and lived for some time in disgrace.

== Marriages and later life ==
Sir Anthony Ashley was married twice. His first wife was Jane Okeover, daughter of Philip Okeover of Okeover Hall. Jane was the widow of Sir Thomas Cokayne of Ashbourne and High Sheriff of Derbyshire. Sir Anthony and Jane were married about 1592 and had a daughter, Anne Ashley.

About 1620, Ashley's daughter, Anne, married John Cooper of Rockbourne. Through this marriage, as the only child and heir of the Ashley family, the Ashley estates at Wimborne St Giles were conveyed to the Cooper family. As a condition of their marriage, Ashley had stipulated that if the family ever attained the peerage, the title would be that of Ashley. This agreement was made prior to the succession of either Ashley as 1st Baronet of Wimborne St Giles or John Cooper as 1st Baronet of Rockbourne.

Sir John and Anne (Ashley) Cooper, in accordance with the agreement, became the parents of the celebrated statesman, Sir Anthony Ashley-Cooper, 1st Earl of Shaftesbury. While he was christened Ashley-Cooper, his siblings and their descendants remained Coopers.

Later in life, when Ashley inherited the Wimborne St Giles estate, he became a liberal benefactor of the parish. He rebuilt the parish church, and built and endowed alms houses for the relief of eleven senior citizens. He also introduced the cultivation of cabbages from Holland.

In 1622, two years after his wife, Jane, died from smallpox, Sir Anthony married 19-year-old Philippa Sheldon. Philippa was the sister of Elizabeth Sheldon, who was married to Christopher (Kit) Villiers, 1st Earl of Anglesey, brother of George Villiers, 1st Duke of Buckingham. Through this marriage, Ashley cemented a political alliance with the most powerful man at court.

=== Baronet of Wimborne St Giles ===
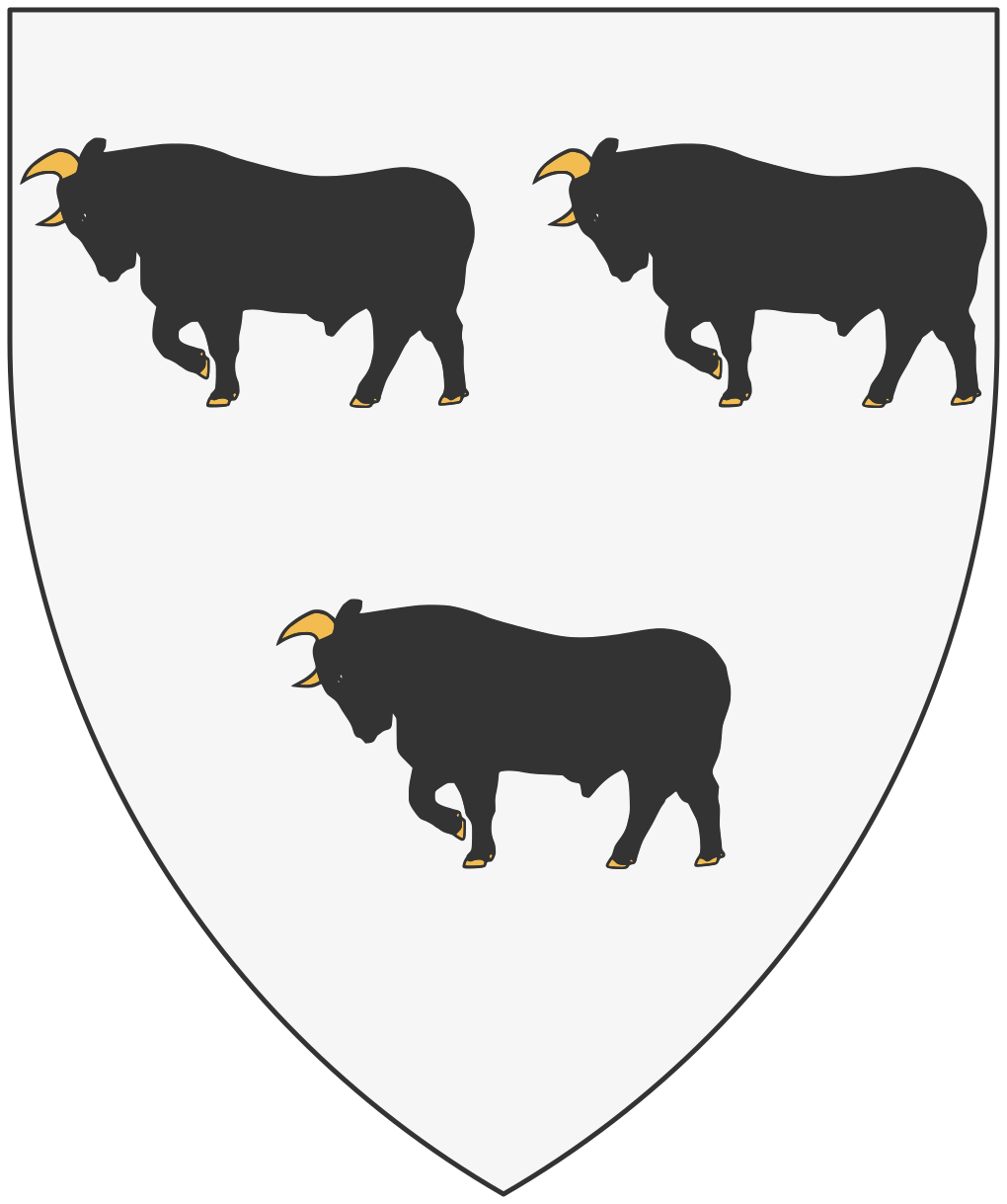
Arms of Ashley of Winbourne St Giles

On 3 July 1622, Sir Anthony Ashley was created 1st Baronet of Wimborne St Giles, By King James I However, his liveliest interests rested in the grandchild born to inherit the ancient possessions of his house. He made arrangements to have him christened, in deviation from custom, with the hyphenated surname of Anthony Ashley-Cooper.

Ashley died in London at His House in Holborn, Jan 1628, Aged 76 He is buried at, Wimborne St Giles Church, The parish church that he was the benefactor of rebuilding, At the foot of his fine canopied tomb monument is preserved, located inside the parish church, is the kneeling figure of his only daughter Anne, who married Sir John Cooper of Rockbourne. She was the mother of Sir Anthony Ashley-Cooper, later the first Earl of Shaftesbury.

After Ashley died, his wife Philippa went on to marry Carew Raleigh, son of Sir Walter Raleigh, while his daughter, Anne, inherited the family estates at Wimborne St Giles, then conveyed to her husband, Sir John Cooper, 1st Baronet, of Rockbourne. Anthony Ashley-Cooper was seven years old when his grandfather died.

=== Sexuality ===
According to Michael B. Young, Ashley's marriages came as a surprise to contemporaries as he was 'known to favour boys'. Vernacular verse of the period remarked that he had “left sodomy [to] marry [Philippa] Sheldon”, and made note of his interest in his wife's "black arse hole", suggesting that any child she had would be illegitimate. In his 1650 work, Anthony Weldon described Ashley as someone who just “never loved any but boyes.”

Baronetage of England
| New creation | Baronet (of Wimborne St Giles); 1622–1628 | Extinct |
