= William Constantine =

English politician

Sir William Constantine (1612–1670) was an English politician who sat in the House of Commons of England from 1640 to 1643. He supported the Royalist side in the English Civil War

Constantine was of an ancient and respectable family of Poole, Dorset. He was educated at the Middle Temple, of which he was chosen reader. He settled at Merly, about five miles from Poole and was admitted a burgess of Poole on 16 September 1631. He was appointed recorder of the borough on 10 December 1639.

In April 1640, Constantine was elected Member of Parliament for Poole in the Short Parliament. He was re-elected in November 1640 for the Long Parliament but was disabled in September 1643 for his support of the king. Constantine was charged with intending to deliver the town of Poole to the king and was discharged from the recordership of Poole. His estate was sequestered by the house and he was sent to London for imprisonment in the King's Bench prison.

After the Restoration, Constantine was restored to his position as recorder on 26 July 1660. He stood for parliament at Poole in 1661 for the Cavalier Parliament where he was the choice of resident freemen but they were outvoted by no-resident voters. He was displaced from his position as recorder by the commissioners under the corporation act on 17 October 1662.

Constantine was knighted in 1668 and died two years later at the age of 58.

Parliament of England
Parliament suspended since 1629	Member of Parliament for Poole; 1640–1643; With: John Pyne	Succeeded by John Pyne; George Skutt
