= Sir John Cooper, 1st Baronet =

English landowner and father of Anthony Ashley Cooper, 1st Earl of Shaftesbury

Sir John Cooper Bt, JP, MP
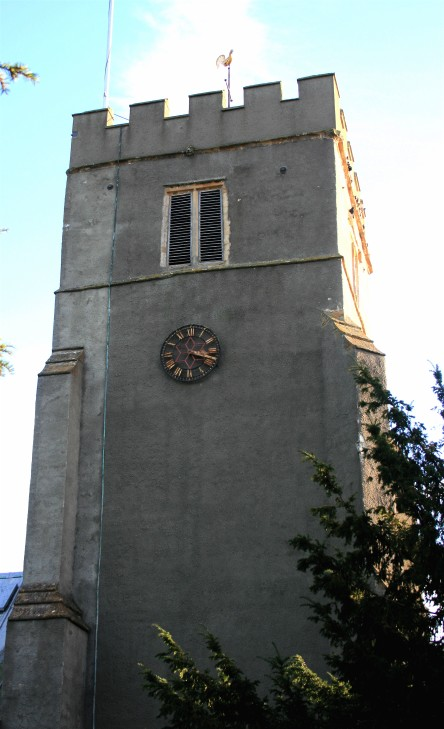
- Church of St John the Baptist, Pawlett, where Sir John was baptised

Member of Parliament for Poole
- In office 1625–1628

Personal details
- Born: 24 October 1597 Pawlett, Somerset
- Died: 23 March 1631 (aged 33) Cassiobury House, Hertfordshire
- Cause of death: Tuberculosis
- Resting place: Wimborne St Giles
- Spouse(s): (1) Anne Ashley (1617–1628) (2) Mary Hicks (1629–his death)
- Children: (1) Anthony Ashley-Cooper, 1st Earl of Shaftesbury (1621–1683); Philippa (1623–1701); George (born 1625)

Sir John Cooper, 1st Baronet, 24 October 1597 to 23 March 1631, was a member of the landed gentry and MP for Poole from 1625 to 1629. He died of tuberculosis, leaving debts of over £40,000 and is best remembered for being the father of Anthony Ashley Cooper, 1st Earl of Shaftesbury.

== Life ==
Cooper was the son of Sir John Cooper (1552–1610) and Margaret, a daughter of Anthony Skutt, of Stanton Drew in Somerset. Cooper's paternal grandfather, a paymaster in Henry VIII of England's service, bought Pawlett manor in about 1530. He had four sisters, Bridget, Margaret, Martha and Jane.

The family prospered, and Cooper's father, a soldier, served as a member of parliament for White church in Hampshire 1584 and 1586. He died in 1610 owning nearly 7,000 acres in Somerset and Hampshire, including the Rockbourne estate which he had only recently purchased. Cooper was then still a minor, but his ward-ship was acquired by an uncle for £324, after a sweetener of £600 was paid to Robert Cecil, 1st Earl of Salisbury, who was at the time the Lord High Treasurer.

Cooper's connection with Dorset dated from his marriage to Sir Anthony Ashley's only child, but initially he played little part in local affairs. In 1623, he was living with his father-in-law in St Giles in the Fields. He had four sisters, Bridget, Margaret, Martha and Jane.

On 4 July 1622, Cooper was created a Baronet by letters patent which described him as of Rockbourne in the county of Southampton. In 1628 Cooper was elected Member of Parliament for Poole. The parliament was dissolved on 10 March 1629.

Cooper married firstly Anne Ashley, the daughter and sole heir of Sir Anthony Ashley, 1st Baronet, of Wimborne St Giles in Dorset. His first wife died soon after her father on 20 July 1628, leaving a daughter, Philippa (who married Sir Adam Brown and died in 1701) and two sons, Anthony-Ashley and George.

Cooper married secondly Mary, Lady Morrison, the widow of Sir Charles Morrison, 1st Baronet and a daughter and coheir of Baptist Hicks, Viscount Campden (1551–1629). There were no children of the marriage.

Cooper was probably recommended to the electors of Poole in 1625 by his wife's uncle, Sir Francis Ashley. He is not known to have contributed to debate during the first Caroline Parliament, and was appointed only to legislative committees concerned with larceny, benefit of clergy, and concealed Crown lands (25 June). Later that year, he was assessed at £50 for a Privy Seal loan. Cooper again sat for Poole in 1628, this time failing to attract a single appointment. However, on 9 February 1629, he confirmed the allegations of Catholic sympathies leveled by his friend Sir Daniel Norton at Bishop Neile of Winchester.

Despite his hostility to the doctrines, practices, and ceremonies associated with the Pope or the papal system, Cooper displayed no obvious puritan leanings, being ‘of an easy and an affable nature’ and a compulsive gambler.

His first wife died of smallpox in 1628, shortly after succeeding to the Ashley estate, and Cooper, who was reputedly "very lovely and graceful both in face and person". He married again to another wealthy widow. According to family tradition he kept three houses fully furnished and staffed, and exercised great hospitality at each of them. He died of tuberculosis in 1631 at Cassiobury, his wife's jointure estate, and was buried at Wimborne St. Giles, leaving debts computed at £40,000 or more.

His widow Mary, Lady Morrison, took as her third husband the younger son of Edward Alford, Sir Daniel Norton acted as guardian to his Stepson and heir, Sir Anthony Ashley Cooper, who sat for Tewkesbury in the Short Parliament, and who, as 1st earl of Shaftesbury, became one of the leading politicians of the Restoration era.

== Notes ==
Parliament of England
| Preceded by Sir Walter Erle; Edward Pitt | Member of Parliament for Poole; 1625; With: John Pyne | Succeeded by John Pyne; Christopher Erle |
| Preceded by John Pyne; Christopher Erle | Member of Parliament for Poole; 1628–1629; With: John Pyne | Parliament suspended until 1640 |
Baronetage of England
| New creation | Baronet (of Rockbourne); 1622–1631 | Succeeded by Anthony Ashley Cooper |
