= John Pyne =

English politician

John Pyne (died 1679) was an English politician who sat in the House of Commons at various times between 1625 and 1653. He supported the Parliamentary cause during the English Civil War, but fell out with Oliver Cromwell during the Interregnum. At the Restoration he was exempted from the general pardon.

== Life ==
Pyne was the son of Thomas Pyne and his wife Amey Hanham, daughter of Thomas Hanham, serjeant-at-law, of Wimborne Minster, Dorset.

In 1625, Pyne was elected Member of Parliament for Poole. He was re-elected in 1626 and 1628 and sat until 1628 when King Charles decided to rule without parliament for eleven years. In 1629, his father already dead, he succeeded to the estates of his grandfather in several counties including the manors of Crewkerne and Little Windsor.

In April 1640, Pyne was re-elected MP for Poole in the Short Parliament, and he was elected again for Poole in the Long Parliament in November 1640. On the outbreak of the Civil War he was Lieutenant-Colonel of Lord Paulet's Somerset Trained Band, the 800-strong force of local militia. However, Paulet was a committed Royalist and Pyne led the regiment over to the Parliamentarians. In August 1642 the regiment was routed by a Royalist force at the Battle of Marshall's Elm. However, it took part in the Siege of Sherborne in September and was still active at the Second Battle of Modbury in February 1643.

In 1643 Pyne was listed as a colonel of the militia raised for the сounty of Somerset and a commissioner for levying taxes for the parliament. Though a strong republican, and an opponent of the Church and churchmen, he withdrew from taking any part as soon as he saw what he thought were the ultimate designs of Oliver Cromwell, and he strongly disapproved of the trial and death of King Charles I.

Pyne refused also to join any of the plots and conspiracies from the death of the Protector to the restoration of the monarchy under King Charles II. However he was one of the twenty persons excepted out of the Act of Oblivion.

Pyne succeeded at last in obtaining the pardon of himself and eldest son (then 27 years of age), which was signed at Breda in 1660. His circumstances appear to have been much reduced as a result of the civil wars, and he seems to have sold and encumbered his property to pay off debts, and perhaps to meet fines and penalties, the consequence of his part in it. Pyne died in 1679 at a "very advanced age".

== Family ==
Pyne married Eleanor Hanham, daughter of Sir John Hanham, of the City of London, and of Wimborne, Dorset. She was possessed of a good fortune and various estates and died 1662, aged 53, leaving him with four sons and two daughters. In 1668, Pyne married for the second time, to Amey, daughter of John White, of Tharnhull, who died in 1692, leaving no children.

Pyne disinherited his eldest son, John Pyne, who died unmarried, at Pitney, in 1696 and lost his second son Arthur at Aleppo. His estates therefore went to his third son Charles.

== Notes ==
Parliament of England
Preceded by Sir Walter Erle; Edward Pitt	Member of Parliament for Poole; 1625–1629; With: Sir John Cooper, 1st Baronet; Christopher Erle; Sir John Cooper, 1st Baronet	Parliament suspended until 1640
Vacant Parliament suspended since 1629	Member of Parliament for Poole; 1640–1653; With: William Constantine 1640–1642; George Skutt 1645–1648	Not represented in Barebones Parliament
