= Church of St Giles, Wimborne St Giles =

Coordinates: 50.90709°N 1.95613°W

Church of St Giles
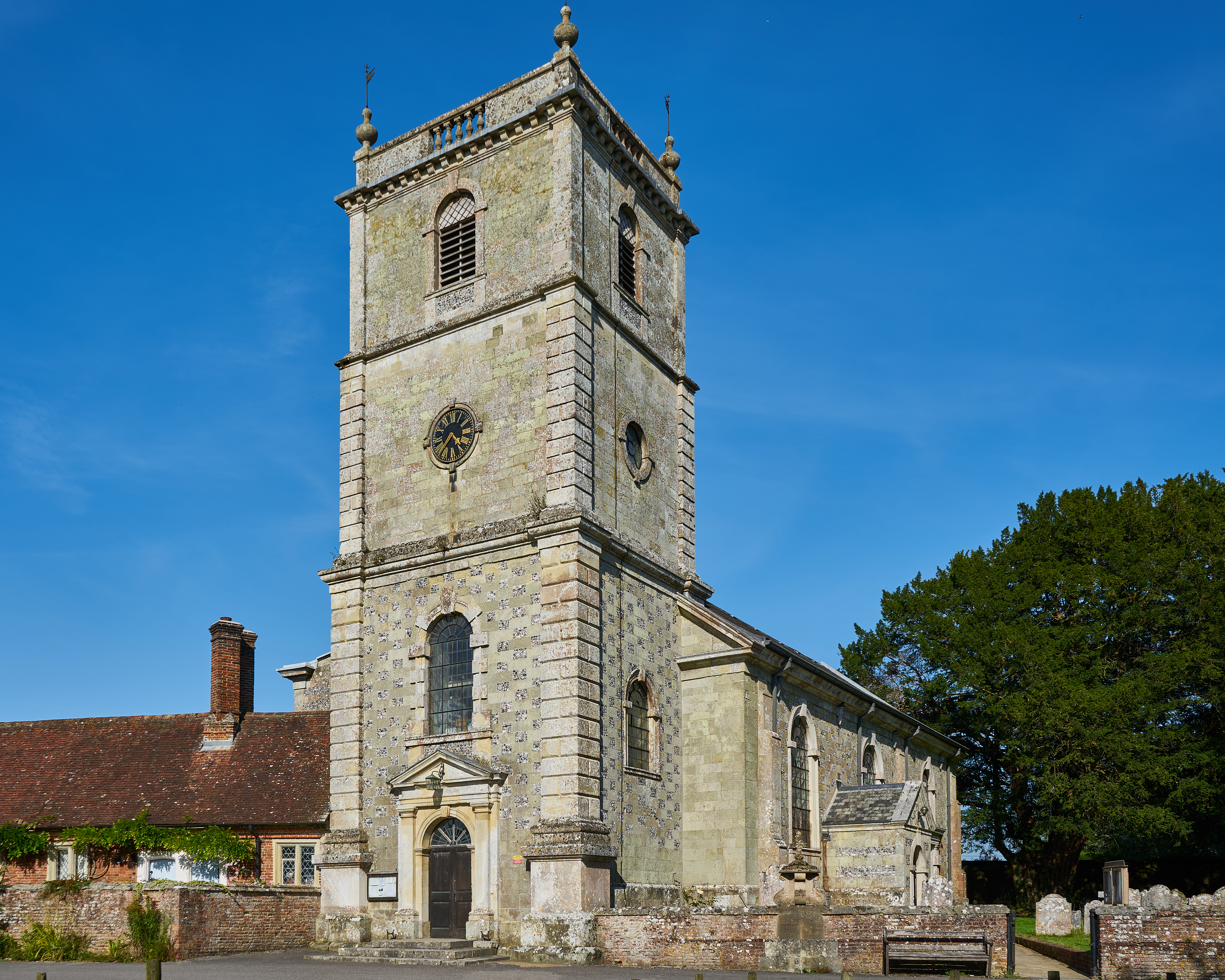
- Church of St Giles from the south west

- Location in Dorset
- Location: Wimborne St Giles, Dorset, England
- Denomination: Church of England

History
- Dedication: Saint Giles

Architecture
- Heritage designation: Grade I
- Designated: 18 March 1955
- Architects: John and William Bastard; George Frederick Bodley; Sir Ninian Comper
- Style: Georgian, Gothic Revival
- Years built: 1732-1910

Administration
- Province: Canterbury
- Diocese: Salisbury
- Archdeaconry: Dorset
- Deanery: Wimborne
- Benefice: Knowlton Circle

The Church of St Giles is the Church of England parish church for the village of Wimborne St Giles, Dorset. Originally founded in the 13th century and rebuilt several times over the ensuing centuries, the present church is a mixture of Georgian and Gothic Revival architecture. It is located at the start of the main driveway to St Giles House, the seat of the Earl of Shaftesbury, at the end of a row of Stuart-era almshouses.

The church has been celebrated by several architectural historians, most notably Sir John Betjeman, who described St Giles as "a treasure-house of Comper work", referring to the restoration carried out on the church by Sir Ninian Comper between 1908 and 1910. The church building has been designated as Grade I listed on the National Heritage List for England, the highest possible rating.

== History ==
=== Origins ===
The first rector of Wimborne St Giles, John de Fissa, was recorded in 1207 and a church is recorded on the site in 1291. This medieval parish church was rebuilt in the 1620s under patronage from Sir Anthony Ashley, 1st Baronet of Wimborne St Giles. Ashley died in 1628 and was buried in a spectacular tomb in the church, which still survives to this day.

The church was rebuilt again in 1732 by John and William Bastard, Dorset architects who most notably rebuilt nearly the entire town of Blandford Forum following a catastrophic fire the previous year. The Bastard siblings also rebuilt Blandford's parish church concurrently with that at Wimborne St Giles. As such, the churches share similar designs with one another, as noted by Pevsner. The 1732 rebuild, in the Early Georgian style, consisted of a tower with nave and south porch, constructed mostly from Greensand ashlar and flint.

=== 19th century remodelling ===
The church was remodelled twice in the 19th century, first by the 7th Earl of Shaftesbury in 1852 and more substantially by the wife of the 8th Earl in 1887, the latter work being designed by notable Gothic Revival architect George Frederick Bodley as a memorial to the Earl, who had committed suicide the previous year. The 1887 remodelling involved splitting the Georgian nave into three with a Gothic-style arcade and adding a north chapel. Whilst this was work being undertaken, a robin nested in one of the newly constructed arcades; it was decided to preserve this nest in a bottle in the wall.

=== 1908 fire and 20th century restoration ===
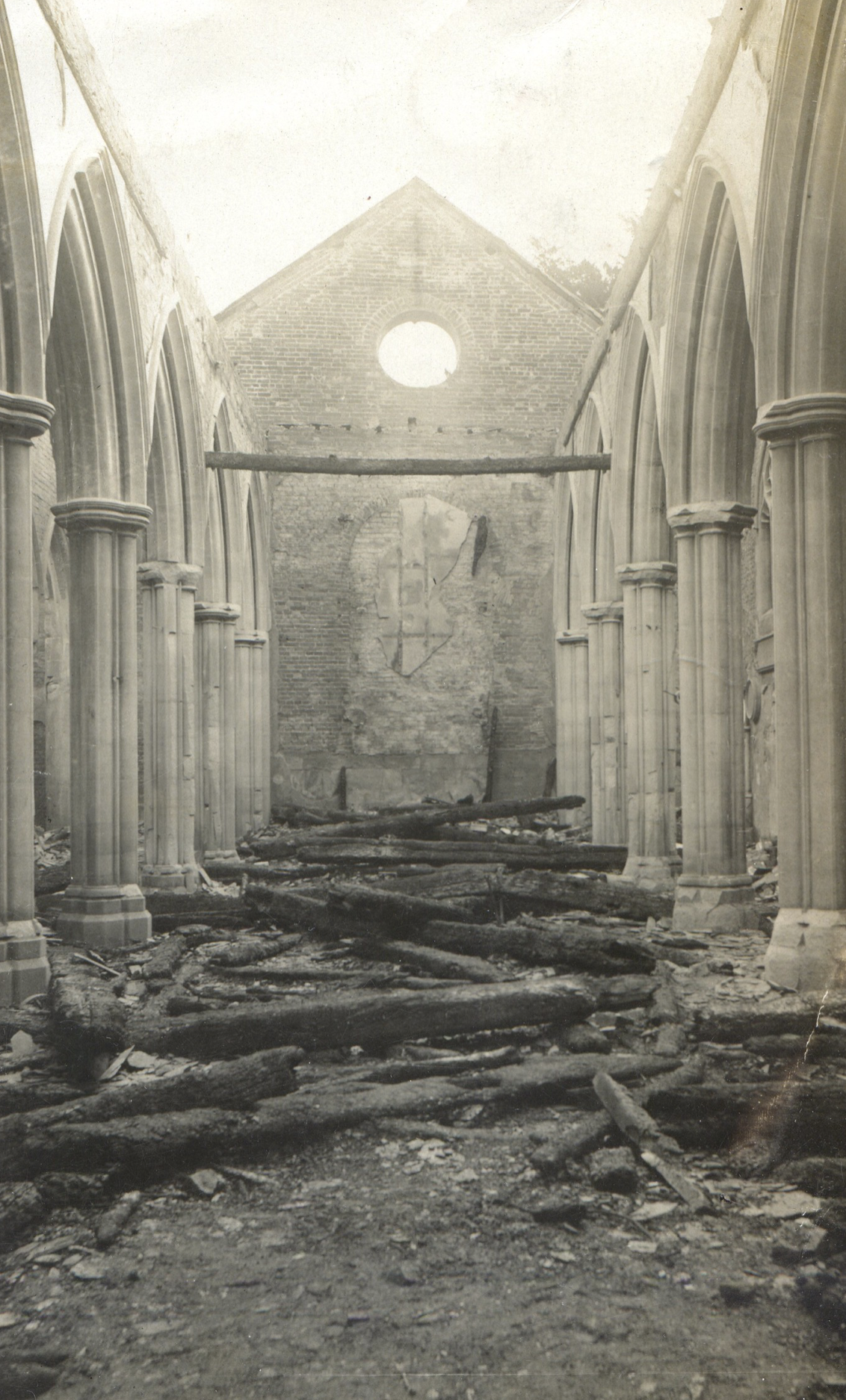
Church in ruins following the 1908 fire

On 30 September, 1908, during soldering work on the lead roof, the church caught fire. The fire spread quickly and by the time it was extinguished, only the walls remained standing; the church a smoking ruin. The majority of the 1732, 1852 and 1887 fittings were destroyed, including most of the stained glass, the organ, church bells and woodwork. Only a few fittings were able to be rescued and the monuments that did survive, such as the font, were severely damaged.

The 9th Earl of Shaftesbury engaged Sir Ninian Comper, a pupil of Bodley, to restore and rebuild the church. Comper rebuilt the church from 1908 to 1910, utilising the surviving 18th century walls and thus keeping its external appearance similar to before the fire. Inside, however, he extended the church northwards with a new north aisle and added a lady chapel. He designed all new stained glass windows, incorporating fragments of the glass that survived the fire and added a new intricate wooden screen to separate the nave and chancel. He also replaced and redesigned the roof, designed numerous new sculptures and added a western gallery to the nave. Comper's work, considered to be one of his best, is designed in the richest Gothic Revival style.

Curiously, the incident of the robin in 1887 repeated itself in 1908. The 1887 nest somehow survived the fire, possibly thanks to being enclosed in a glass bottle, and both nests were grouted into the wall of the new arcade. An inscription near the altar makes reference to these events.

== Architecture ==
=== Plan ===
The church has an unusual square plan, mostly due to the short and wide aisles, with west tower, south porch, chancel and north vestry. The nave is formed of three bays, with one bay chancel to the east. The north aisle extends the full length of the nave and chancel, and adjoins the tower to the west. The south porch extends a small distance from the wall of the nave, barely one bay in length. The church vestry, trapezoid-like in shape, abuts the southern end of the almshouses and the northern face of the tower. The church building covers an area of 389 square metres (4,190 sq ft), which according to Church of England categories, makes it a 'medium'-sized parish church. (Note: The Church of England's Church Heritage Record website puts church buildings into categories based on their size. Under 200 sq m is considered to be small, 200-599 sq m is medium, 600-999 sq m is large, and anything over 1,000 is very large.)

=== Exterior ===
The exterior of the church mostly retains its classical Georgian appearance despite numerous restorations, featuring round-headed windows, a balustraded parapet to the tower, and Tuscan columns framing the doorways. The three stage west tower is the chief external feature, rising two stories above the nave walls. The lower stage contains the west doorway, now used as the main entrance to the church. It has a panelled door with Tuscan pilasters supporting an entablature and pediment. Above the doorway is a large round-headed window, with a rusticated surround. The south tower wall has a smaller round-headed window in its lower face. The middle stage of the tower has circular openings. Above this is the belfry stage, containing round-headed louvred belfry windows.

The nave has three round-headed windows with moulded architraves, imposts and keystones. There is a small south porch between the first and second bays of the nave, featuring a pediment above a round arch. The chancel has a rounded window with a bullseye design in the eastern gable end. The chancel doorway, located underneath the easternmost window on the south wall, is similar to that of the west doorway, except it also contains a pulvinated frieze.

The north nave aisle, entirely a creation of Comper, cannot easily be seen from the exterior due to its location by the private almshouses. It has four massive Gothic style windows with idiosyncratic tracery but due to its location, does not detract from the otherwise uniform Georgian exterior.

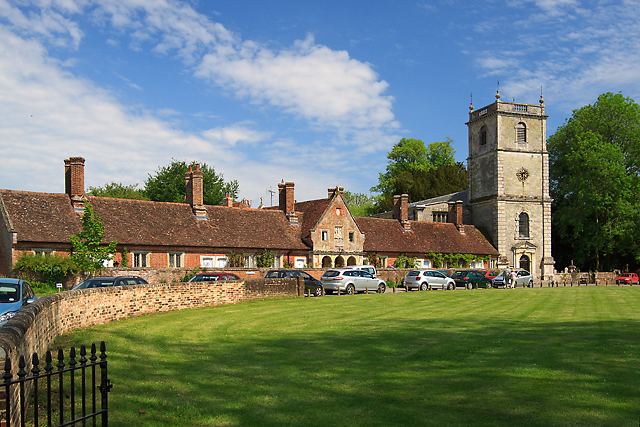
Church and Almshouses

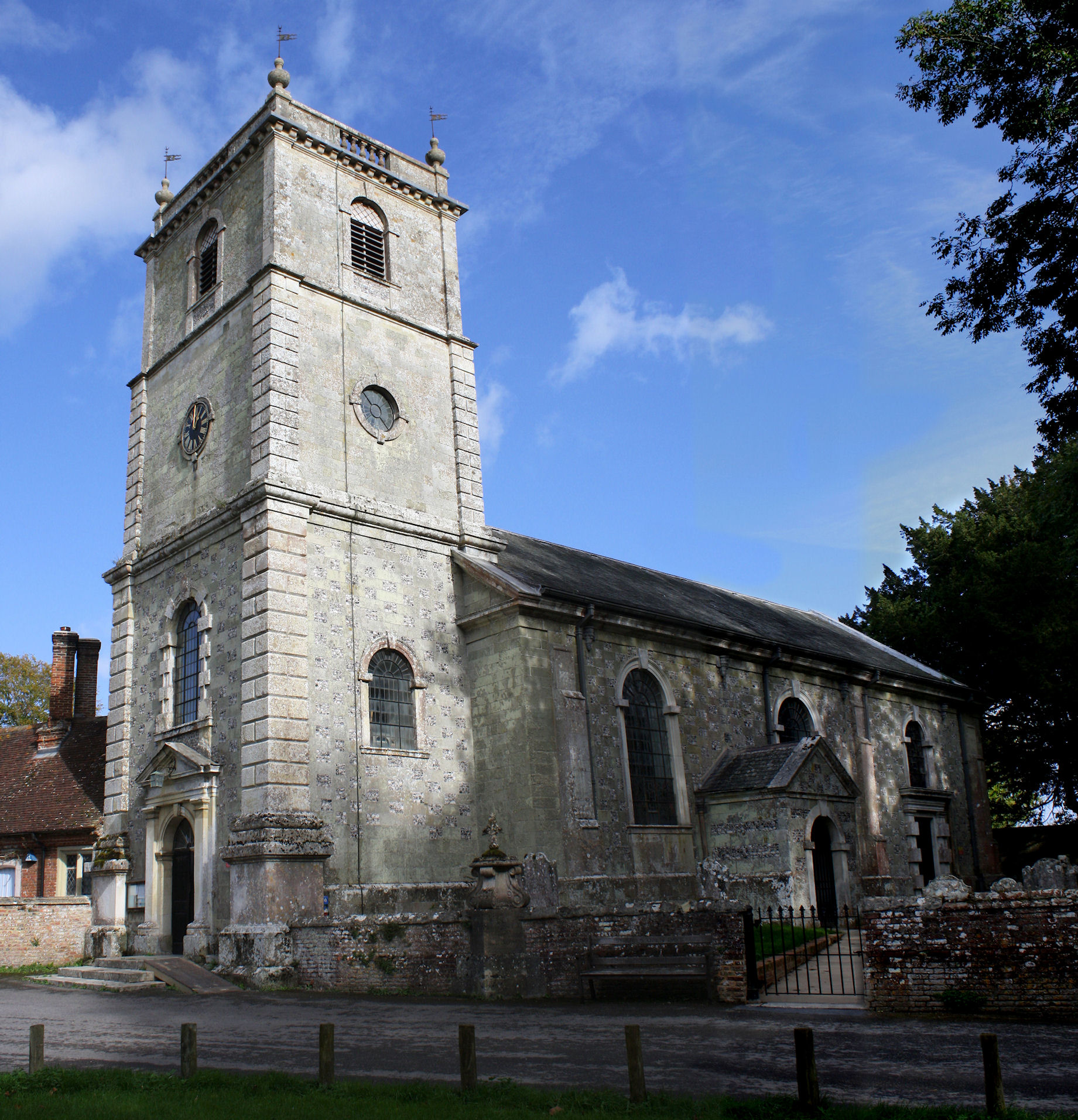
Church from the south, showing nave and south porch

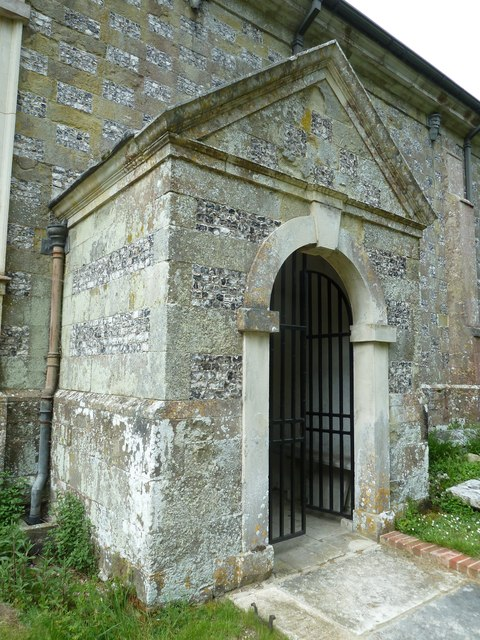
South porch detail

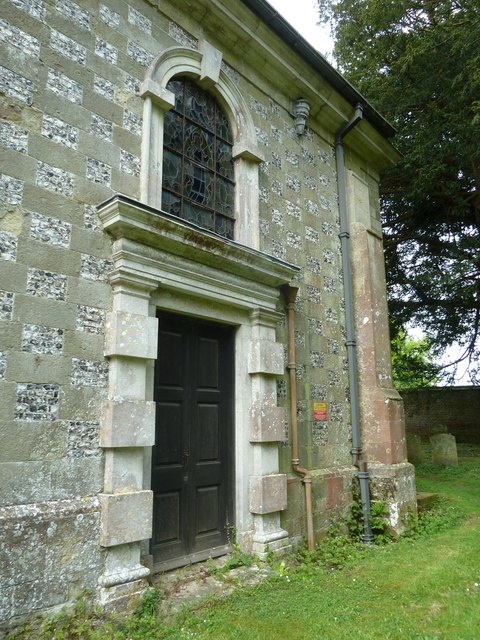
Chancel door

=== Interior ===
==== Description ====
The interior, in a contrast to the relatively plain and classical lines of the exterior, is rich Gothic Revival and is nearly entirely the work of Comper from 1908 to 1910. Though the Georgian-style windows in the nave and chancel are preserved, the rest of the interior resembles a Gothic church far more than a Georgian one. The main aisle is split into two with a four-bay arcade. The columns of the arcade are round, featuring moulded bases and the caps bearing shields supporting chamfered pointed arches. The arcade makes the south nave aisle extremely narrow, featuring a simple brace-beamed lean-to roof. The nave and chancel roof is of the braced tie-beam design, with trusses springing from carved angels and a plasterwork ceiling.

The chief feature of the interior is the carved oak screen separating the chancel from the nave. It was designed by Comper and features figures of the Crucifixion and apostles; it is ten bays in length and stretches the entire width of the interior. In the chancel, a finely decorated alabaster reredos depicting figures of various saints sits underneath a highly decorative gilded tester, similar to the one in Durham Cathedral, also designed by Comper. The north aisle, wholly Comper's work, contains four large windows containing reused glass from Oriel College, Oxford. The roof to the north aisle is of a simpler brace-beamed design. Comper also added a long western gallery during his restoration, giving access to the organ and bell ringing chamber.

==== Stained glass ====
The majority of St Giles' Georgian glass was destroyed by the 1908 fire, only fragments remained. The westernmost window in the upper part of the north aisle was originally Bodley's work and was reformed by Comper from two separate windows. The oldest window in the church is in the south aisle, featuring 18th century Flemish glass depicting Saint Andrew, donated to the church in 1785. It partially survived the fire of 1908 and was reset in the original window with additional clear glass.

==== Monuments and fittings ====
For the small size of the village and church, it has numerous monuments, mostly dedicated to the various Earls of Shaftesbury. These monuments are a small fraction of what the church previously contained, many were destroyed by the fire of 1908 and the rest were severely damaged. The surviving monuments, much restored by Comper, include a reconstructed 14th century effigy of a knight, the memorials to the 1st, 3rd, 4th, 5th and 6th Earls of Shaftesbury, the Shaftesbury family pew, and the Ashley Monument.

The Ashley Monument is a large and ornate memorial to Sir Anthony Ashley, grandfather to the 1st Earl, who provided much of the money to have the church rebuilt in the 17th century. The monument, much damaged in the fire, was extensively restored by Comper and as such has been described as "a riot of colour, unmatched in Dorset". The memorial, which includes effigies of Anthony and his wife, also features a hexagonal orb. This orb has eluded many researchers as to its purpose, with various theories proposed, including that it represents a cabbage. Anthony was believed by diarist John Evely to have introduced the now-common vegetable to England.

There is also a Georgian font, located underneath the western gallery. The font, which survives almost unaltered, was built by the Bastard brothers in 1732. It is a strapwork marble font, topped by an ornate gilded cover in the shape of a steeple, again by Comper.

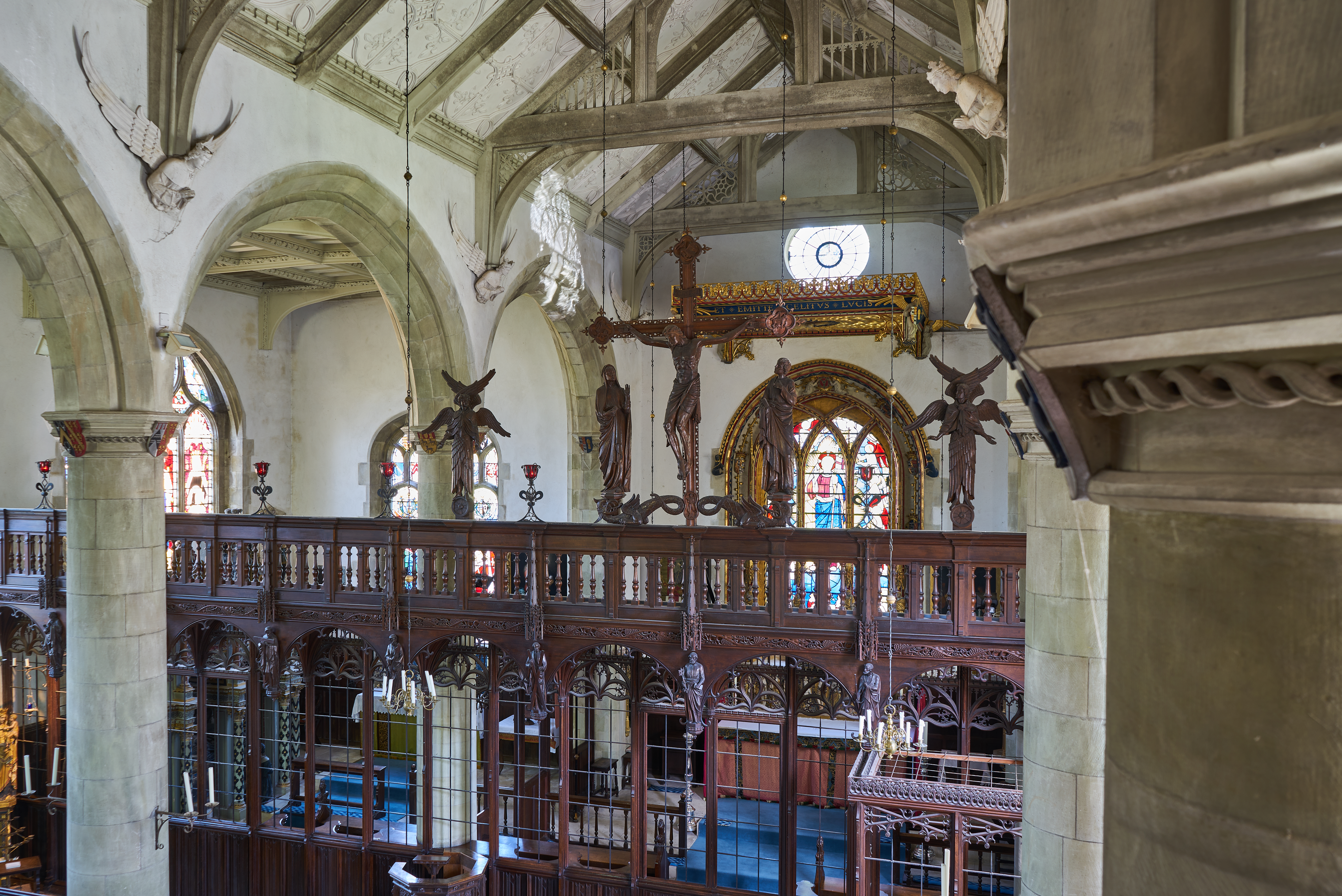
Eastern end from western gallery

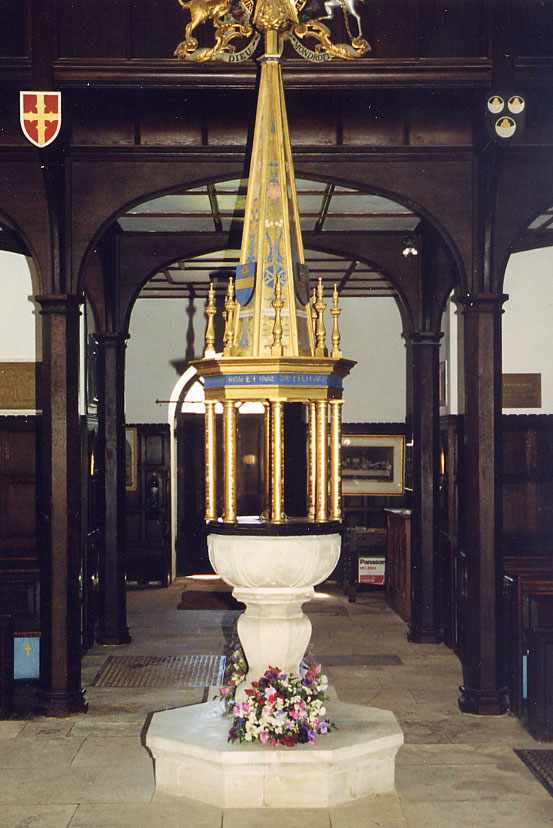
Font and cover

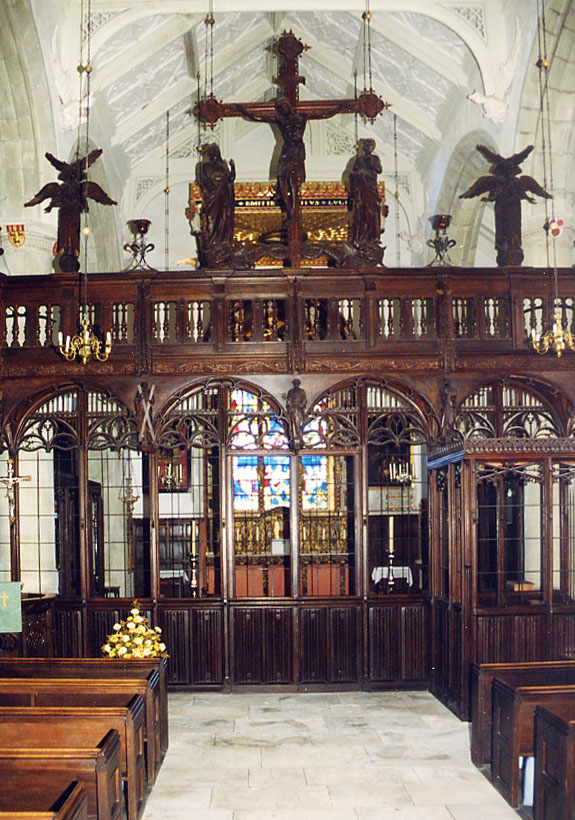
Rood screen

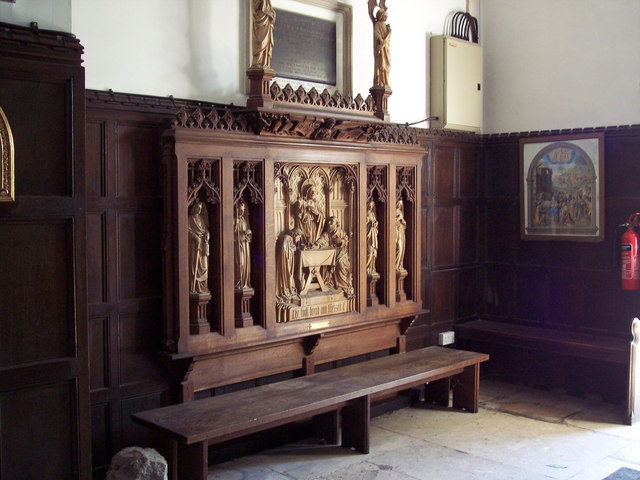
Family pew for the Earl of Shaftesbury

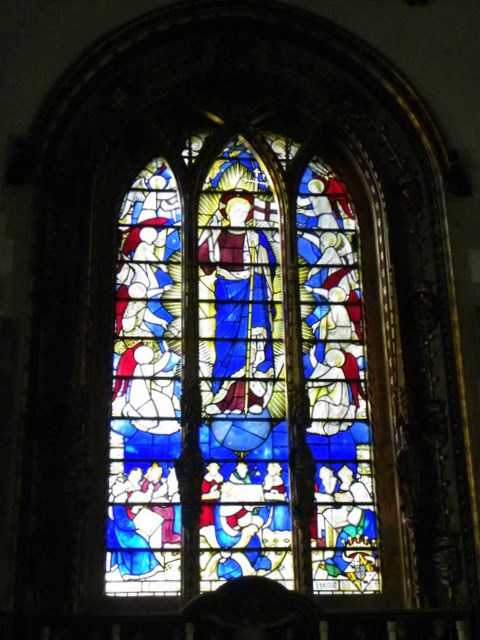
Stained glass window above the altar

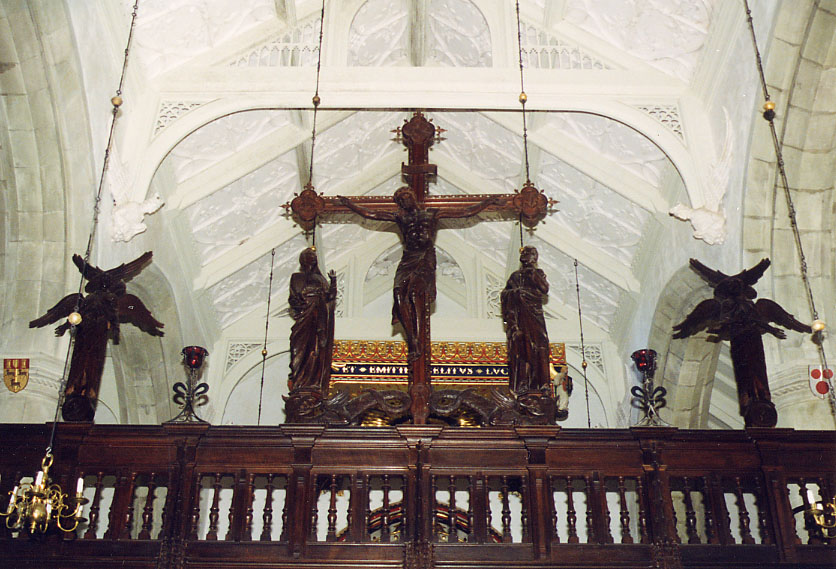
Rood screen and roof detail

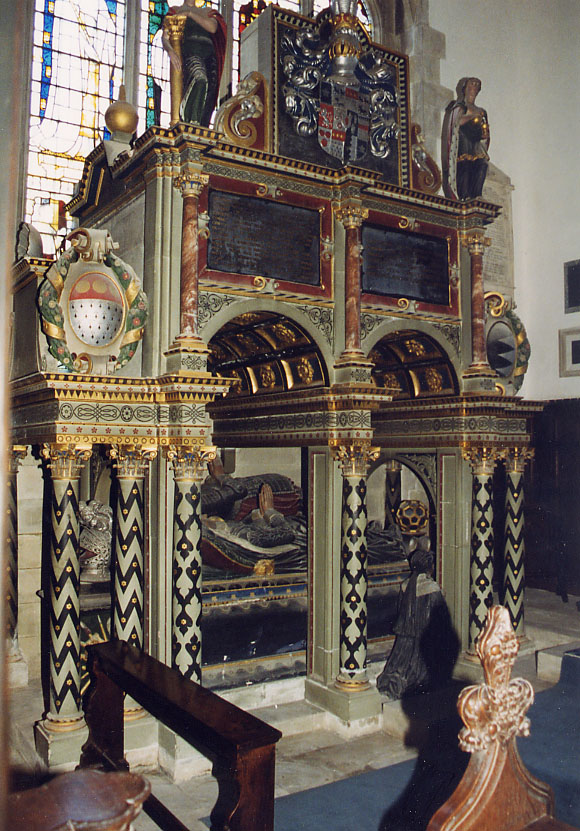
Ashley Monument

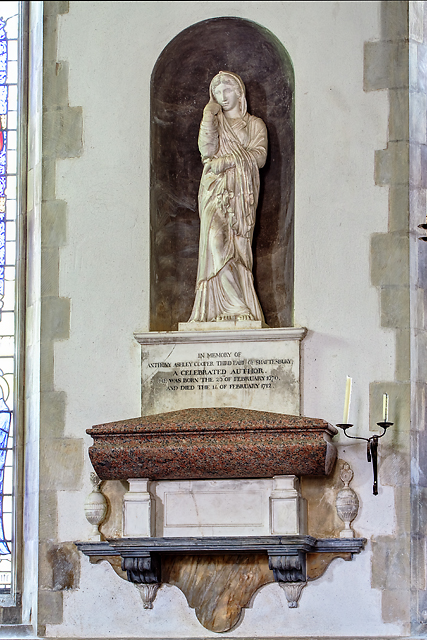
Monument to the 3rd Earl

== Organ ==
The earliest record of an organ in Wimborne St Giles dates back to 1885 when a two-manual organ was built by Wordsworth & Maskell of Leeds, West Yorkshire. This organ was destroyed in the 1908 fire and was replaced by a new Harrison & Harrison organ. The contract to build the new organ was signed by Lord Shaftesbury on 31 December, 1908, costing him £660. The organ case, designed by Comper, sits centrally on the western gallery. The new instrument was completed in 1910 and has 14 speaking stops. In 1997, the organ was inducted into the Historic Organ Listing Scheme. It was restored by John Budgen of Warminster in 2001.

== Bells ==
The earliest record of bells at Wimborne St Giles is in a 1552 inventory, where three bells are recorded. There were also three bells recorded in the same inventory at Wimborne All Saints (part of the Cranborne hundred). In 1656, a small bell was cast by William Purdue III and Nathaniel Parker of Salisbury and added to the church tower as a service bell. It weighed approximately three-quarters of a hundredweight (38 kg).

In 1732, the parishes of both churches were joined, and so the three bells from All Saints were put towards the recasting of the bells at St Giles. A clock bell was cast by William Toiser of Salisbury in 1732 and hung on the tower roof. This bell weighed approximately one and a half hundredweight (75 kg). Apart from these two small bells, the three bells from St Giles and the three from All Saints were broken up and recast into a ring of six bells in 1737 by Abel Rudhall of Gloucester. The heaviest bell, the tenor, weighed approximately 9 long cwt (460 kg).

All of these bells, including the two smaller ones, were destroyed in the blaze of 1908, when the fire consumed the timber bell frame and the floors in the tower, causing the bells to fall to the ground. From their casting in 1737 until their destruction in 1908, they were the only example in Dorset of Rudhall bells. Dorset gained a further set of Rudhall bells in 1974 when the county border changes brought Christchurch Priory into Dorset, which contains four Rudhall bells within its ring of twelve.

As the restoration of the tower neared completion in 1909, Comper was concerned with the ability of the fire-weakened walls to support a ring of bells again. He proposed one large bell, however, the tower proved quite capable of housing more, so in 1910, a ring of six bells was cast and installed by John Taylor & Co of Loughborough. These six bells were hung in a new cast iron frame dug into the tower walls. They were heavier than their predecessors, the tenor bell weighing 12 long cwt 1 qr 12 lb (628 kg) and striking the note G. The new bells were dedicated on 10 September, 1910; St Giles' Day.

In 1928, these bells were augmented to eight by Taylor's, rather more unusually by adding a treble and tenor. The fourth bell was retuned down a semitone to B^{b} to become the fifth, with the new treble and tenor bells striking the note F. The previous six bells were thus renumbered to become bells two to seven. The tenor bell now weighs 14 long cwt 1 qr 5 lb (726 kg). The 1910 metal frame was extended to fit in the extra two bells.

In 2014, the sixth bell cracked as a result of an accident and was recast by Taylor's in 2015 to the same dimensions as the original. The newly recast bell, which reused the fittings from 1910, was inspected by the then Prime Minister David Cameron at Taylor's foundry in Loughborough during his tour of the works, before being rehung at the church.
