= Capture of Cádiz (1596) =

Battle during the Anglo-Spanish War

- Part of the Anglo-Spanish War (1585–1604) and the Eighty Years' War
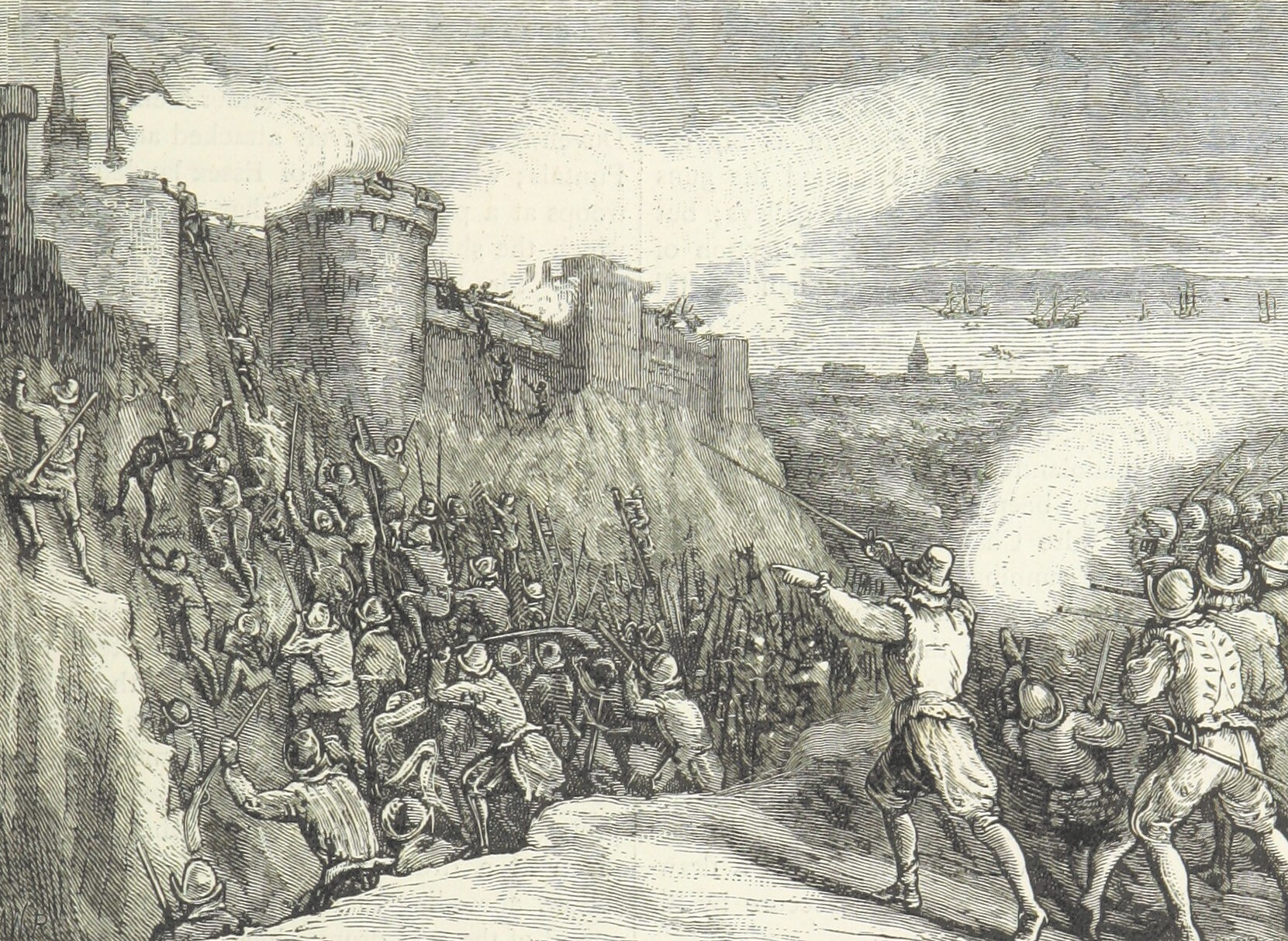
- British illustration of English troops storming Cádiz
Date	30 June – 15 July 1596 (Note: New Style date)
Location	Bay of Cádiz & Faro 36.5333°N 6.28333°W
Result	Anglo-Dutch victory

Belligerents
Spain	England; Dutch Republic

Commanders and leaders
(Spain) Alonso Pérez (Spain) Alonso de Bazán	(England) Charles Howard (England) Robert Devereux (Dutch Republic) Jacob van Duivenvoorde (England) Walter Raleigh (England) Francis Vere

Strength
40 ships and 5,000 men	150 ships and 14,000 men

Casualties and losses
32 ships scuttled or sunk	3 galleons sunk or burnt, 2 other ships sunk, 5 other ships captured, ~2,000 killed

The capture of Cádiz in 1596 was an event during the Anglo-Spanish War (1585–1604) and the Eighty Years' War, when English and Dutch troops under Robert Devereux, 2nd Earl of Essex, and a large Anglo-Dutch fleet under Charles Howard, 1st Earl of Nottingham, with support from the Dutch Republic, raided the Spanish city of Cádiz.

Due to the Spanish commander's lack of foresight and organisation, the Anglo-Dutch forces met little resistance. In order to deny the raiders their prize, the Spanish set fire to the treasure fleet anchored in the Bay of Cádiz. The attacking forces disembarked, captured, sacked, and burned the city and took hostage several of the city's prominent citizens, who were taken back to England to await payment of their ransom.

The economic losses caused during the sacking were numerous: the city was burned, as was the fleet, in what was one of the principal English victories in the course of the war. Despite its failure in its primary objective of seizing the Spanish treasure fleet's silver, the raid contributed to Spain's declaration of bankruptcy the following year.

== Background ==
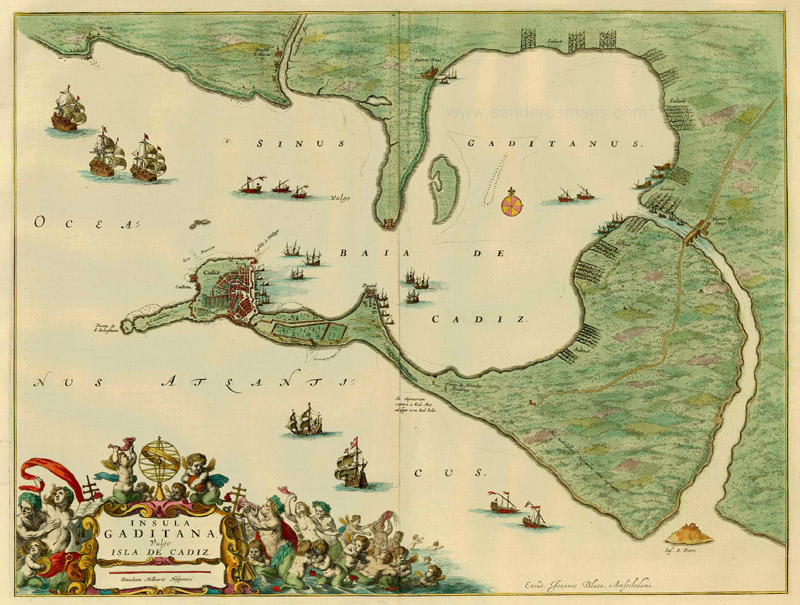
Map of the Bay of Cádiz, 17th century

On 13 June 1596 the fleet set sail from Plymouth. The fleet comprised 150 English and Dutch ships, 17 of which belonged to the Royal Navy, divided into four squadrons with 6,360 private soldiers, 1,000 English volunteers, and 6,772 sailors.

Charles Howard, 1st Earl of Nottingham, was the admiral commanding the fleet, while the landing forces were under the command of Robert Devereux, 2nd Earl of Essex, Lord Thomas Howard, Sir Walter Raleigh, and Sir Francis Vere each commanding their respective units. Anthony Ashley was the Clerk of the Privy Council and was a representative of Queen Elizabeth I of England. Cristóvão and Manuel of Portugal, sons of António of Portugal, and supposedly Antonio Pérez, were also on board, although without command. These forces were joined by another 20 ships from the United Provinces, with 2,000 men on board, who under the command of Admiral John de Duyvenvoorde, Lord of Warmond, were put under English orders.

The city of Cádiz, with approximately 6,000 inhabitants, was one of the principal Spanish ports and point of departure for the Spanish treasure fleet for New Spain.

== Campaign ==
On Saturday, 29 June, there arrived in Cádiz news coming from Lagos, Portugal in the Algarve, advising of the presence of an English fleet. At that moment there were in the Bay of Cádiz some 40 Spanish ships, ranging from galleys to galleons, as well as 16 other vessels from the Spanish convoy, which were disarmed and ready to depart for the West Indies. These unarmed vessels immediately fled to Puerto Real for refuge. Juan Portocarrero and Alonso de Bazán weighed anchor in front of the Spanish galleys, intending to prevent the Anglo-Dutch fleet from passing into the interior of the bay. On Sunday, 30 June at 2 o'clock in the morning, the Anglo-Dutch fleet could be seen from Cádiz, but it could not enter the bay due to bad weather.

=== Capture ===
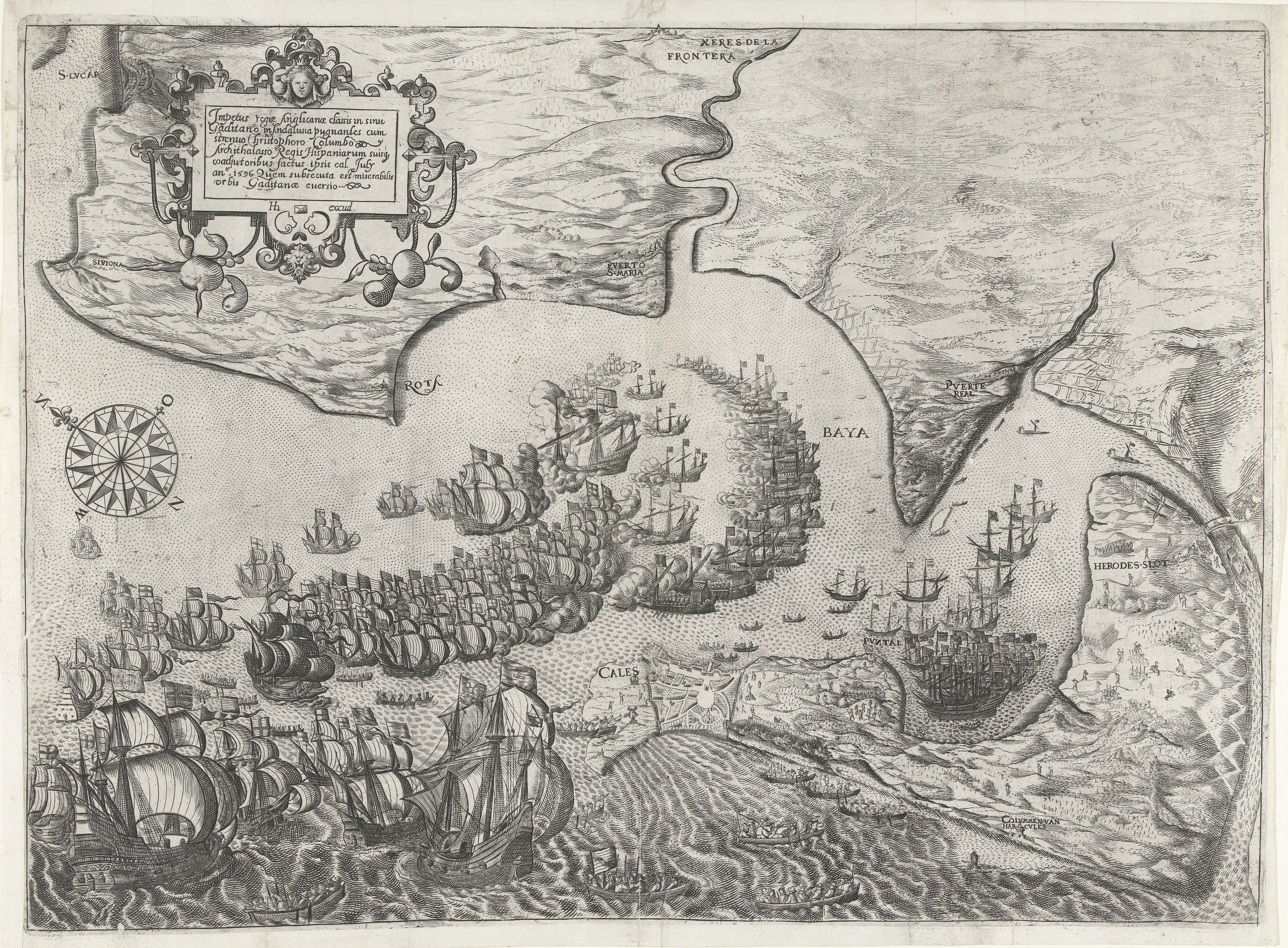
Start of the battle

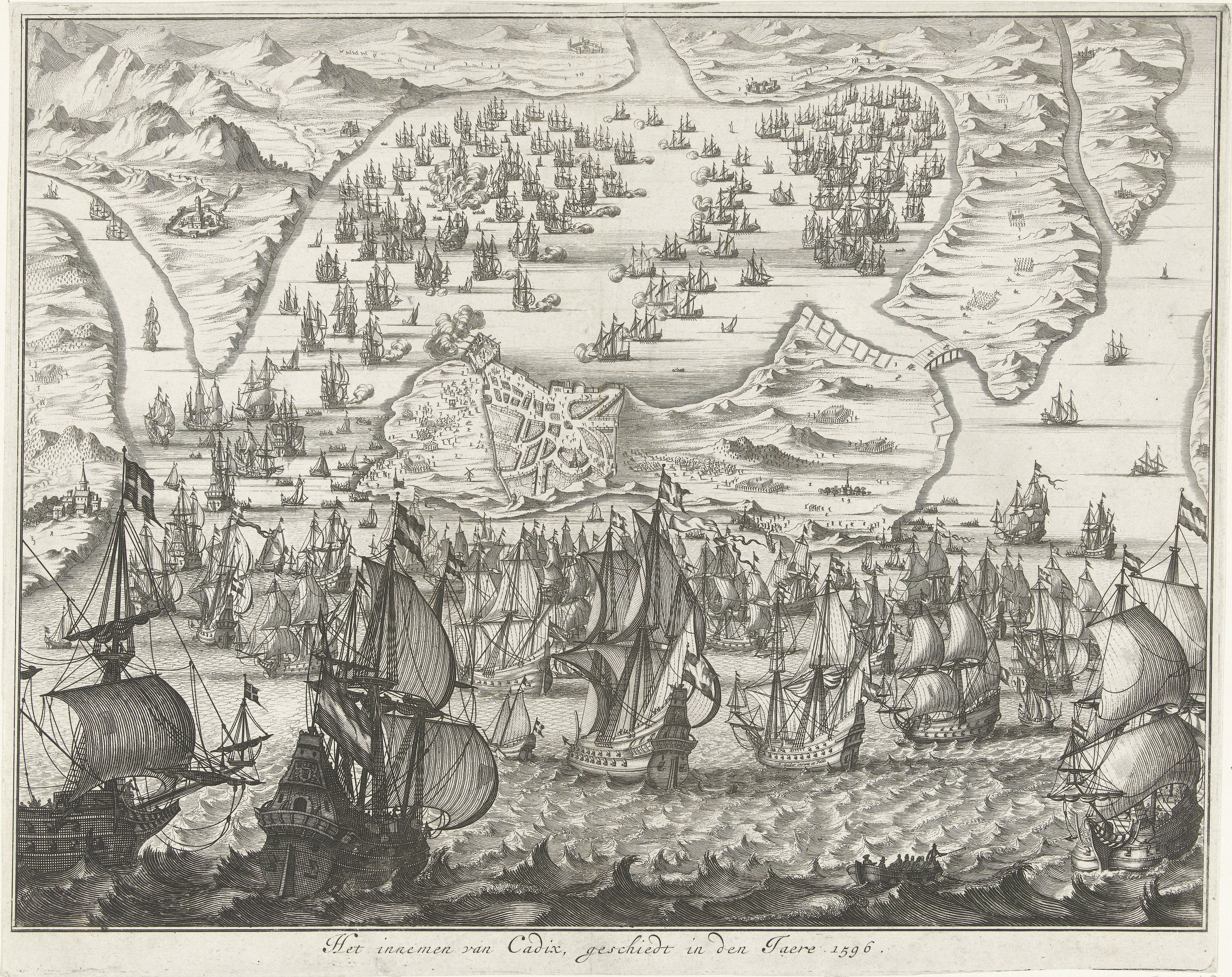
The battle progresses

At 5 o'clock in the morning, both sides commenced an intense artillery barrage. After two hours, the Spanish fleet, outnumbering the English, had to retreat to the interior of the bay. In the fray, the Spanish galleons San Andrés and San Mateo were captured, while the San Felipe and Santo Tomás sank, set fire by their captains in the face of possible capture by the Anglo-Dutch forces. They entered the bay at 8 o'clock in the morning.

By midday, reinforcements sent by the Duke of Medina-Sidonia, Alonso Pérez de Guzmán arrived in Cádiz from Vejer de la Frontera, Jerez, Arcos de la Frontera, Medina-Sidonia, Puerto Real, and Chiclana de la Frontera. For the most part, the soldiers were new and poorly armed. These reinforcements were joined by 5,000 men deployed from Santa Catalina and San Felipe. At 2 o'clock in the afternoon, no more than 200 Englishmen disembarked on El Puntal, bringing under fire the Spanish forces charged with its defense. The forces had been sent into battle with nobody in command. Before 5 o'clock in the afternoon, the English advance force took control of the city with scarcely any resistance, while another part of the army advanced toward Point Zuazo in San Fernando, which was defended by Spanish forces. In the skirmishes in front of the city, each side lost approximately 25 men. The fort of San Felipe surrendered the next day.

The poor state of the artillery, shortage of ammunition, and poor preparation of the forces and the lack of organization by Spanish authorities all motivated the scant resistance against attacking forces. The defensive tactics had to be improvised by Captain Pedro de Guía, the Mayor of Cádiz Antonio Girón, and the Duke of Medina-Sidonia in Jerez. As was stated afterwards: "...the disorder had been, after the will of the Lord, the cause of the loss of this city, because all were heads of command and none were feet that would follow, and that is how they lost, for not having either feet or head." As a result of his contributions Robert Radclyffe, 5th Earl of Sussex, was knighted by the Earl of Essex for his role in taking the city.

=== Sacking ===
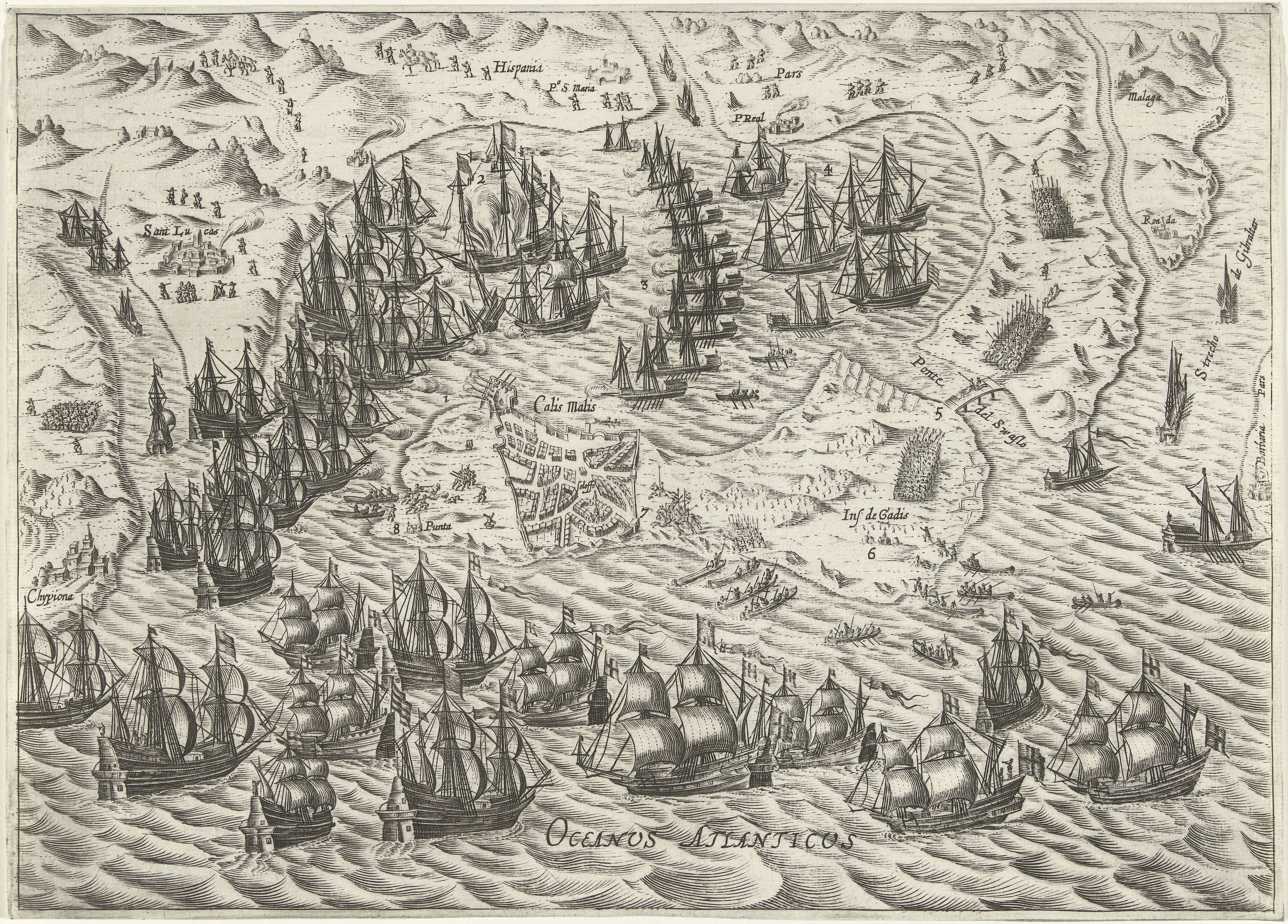
The battle draws to a close.

Already in possession, the English and Dutch troops dedicated themselves to sacking the city. Churches and people's houses were the object of pillaging, although the troops did respect the integrity of the people themselves: "They treated very well the people and in particular the women, not offending them in any way." (Lope de Valenzuela) Before it was possible for the English forces to capture the Spanish fleet taking refuge in Puerto Real, Medina-Sidonia ordered its destruction. 32 ships, including the armada's galleys and the vessels from the treasure fleet, were burned.

The next day, 3 July, the city's civil and ecclesiastical authorities made a pact with the English troops allowing the citizens of Cádiz to leave in exchange for a ransom of 120,000 ducats and the freedom of 51 English prisoners captured in past campaigns. The gaditanos (citizens of Cádiz) left the city for Point Zuazo with nothing more than they could carry. In guarantee of payment of the agreed-on ransom, various prominent citizens of the city were kept as hostages, including the president of the Casa de Contratación, the mayor, council members, and religious figures.

The Earl of Essex, Francis Vere and the Dutch commanders demonstrated support for keeping the city in Anglo-Dutch hands, provisioning and garrisoning it for use as a base of operations. This seems to have been contrary to the wishes of Admiral Howard and the rest of the English officials, who considered it to be a hazardous enterprise due to an eventual Spanish counterattack and was against the orders of the English Queen, frustrating plans for occupying the city. On 14 July, the English burned Cádiz and the next day they left the bay, taking the hostages with them since the Spanish authorities had not been able to pay the ransom.

=== Portugal ===
On its return trip to England, the fleet disembarked at and burned Faro, Portugal. The raiders also took away with them the contents of the library of the Bishop of Faro, and the books were donated to the Bodleian Library at the University of Oxford by the Earl of Essex on their return to England. On the heights of Lisbon, they received news of the imminent arrival of the treasure fleet in the Azores. The Earl of Essex proposed to capture the fleet, but Admiral Howard opposed him, saying that it would be contrary to orders. With that, the fleet resumed its journey to Plymouth, where they arrived a few days later.

== Aftermath ==
The sacking of Cádiz in 1596 was one of the worst Spanish defeats in the course of the war, together with an earlier attack on the city in 1587, as well as the loss of the Spanish Armada in 1588. The economic losses produced by the Earl of Essex's expedition against the city and the anchored fleet in the port, estimated at 5 million ducats, contributed to the bankruptcy of the royal treasury that same year. Nevertheless, the recuperative capacity of the Spanish Armada was proven with the organization of a fleet that in October 1596, known as the 2nd Spanish Armada under the command of Martín de Padilla, set sail against the English coast. A storm in the Bay of Biscay however caused heavy losses and the fleet staggered back to port. Philip though still bent on revenge for the sack of Cádiz was determined for the operation to go ahead. So the following year in September a rushed and poorly organised Third Spanish Armada set sail. Again a storm put paid to the operation just off the English coast dispersing the fleet, driving some ashore with others captured.

The city of Cádiz remained devastated; in addition to the churches and hospitals, 290 out of a total of 1,303 houses burned. After the departure of the English and Dutch, the Spanish authorities considered the possibility of fortifying the city or dismantling it and relocating it to Puerto de Santa María. The military engineers Luis Bravo de Laguna, Tuburzio Spannocchi, Peleazzo Fratín, and Cristóbal de Rojas all presented plans for these options. Finally, it was decided to follow the plans laid out by Cristóbal de Rojas, who began construction of the fortifications in 1598. Philip II gave the city a ten-year extension on the payment of taxes. Every attempt to repeat the raid, over the course of the next two centuries, failed.

The hostages would not be freed until July 1603, after the death of Elizabeth I and her succession by James I of England. The next year, Spain and England ended the war with the signing of the Treaty of London (1604).

The English would later try to repeat this raid in the ill-fated Cádiz Expedition of 1625.

=== Miscellany ===
- The story of the 1596 expedition to Cádiz, recounted by the English historian Richard Hakluyt in his book The Principal Navigations, Voyages, Traffiques and Discoveries of the English Nation, was suppressed in the first editions by order of Elizabeth I, supposedly because of tensions between the queen and the Earl of Essex.
- The attack on Cádiz, in the course of which the English troops seized a large quantity of sherry (vino de Jerez), contributed to the popularization in England of the consumption of this drink, giving rise to the legend that the attacking troops sacked the city in order to capture the wine.
- Miguel de Cervantes dedicated a satirical sonnet to the troops that the Duke of Medina-Sidonia and Captain Becerra led to Cádiz after the English troops' departure.
- It was during this battle that according to eyewitnesses the Earl of Essex famously scaled the walls of Cádiz single-handedly
- It is a major element in the plot of the historical novel The Grove of Eagles by Winston Graham.
- English troops desecrated a statue of the Virgin Mother and Child when it was taken from a Cádiz church to the market square. Afterwards the mutilated statue named Our Lady Vulnerata was brought to the Chapel at the English College in Valladolid in 1600 by the priests and seminarians to make reparation for the behaviour of their fellow countrymen.
- Thomas Gates, the future governor of Jamestown in 1610, was knighted by the Earl of Essex for bravery during the battle.
- Robert Radclyffe, 5th Earl of Sussex, was knighted by the Earl of Essex for the taking of Cádiz.
