= Edward Pitt =

English landowner and politician

- Born: 1592
- Died: 1643 (aged 50–51)
- Burial place: Stratfieldsaye
- Occupation: Politician
- Years active: 1624-1643
- Parents: William Pitt (father); Edith Pitt (mother)

Edward Pitt (1592–1643) was an English landowner and politician who sat in the House of Commons in 1624.

Pitt was the son of Sir William Pitt and his wife Edith Cadbury, daughter of Nicholas Cadbury of Arne, Dorset. He was a teller in the Exchequer. In 1624, he was elected Member of Parliament for Poole in the Happy Parliament. In the Civil War he was seized by parliamentary forces at his home Stratfield Saye House in 1643 and imprisoned in Windsor Castle. He died a week after his release.

Pitt married Rachel Morton, daughter of Sir George Morton, 1st Baronet of Milborne St. Andrew, Dorset. Their son George was also an MP.

Parliament of England
Preceded by Sir Walter Erle; Sir George Hussey	Member of Parliament for Poole; 1624; With: Sir Walter Erle	Succeeded by John Pyne; Sir John Cooper
