= Battle of Marshall's Elm =

1642 skirmish in Somerset prior to the English Civil War

Coordinates: 51°06′25″N 02°44′15″W

- Part of the First English Civil War
| Date | 4 August 1642 |
| Location | Marshall's Elm, south of Street, Somerset |
| Result | Royalist victory |

Belligerents
| Royalists | Parliamentarians |

Commanders and leaders
| Sir John Stawell; Henry Lunsford | Sir John Pyne |

Strength
| 60–80 | 500–600 |
- Location of the battle within Somerset

The battle of Marshall's Elm was a skirmish that took place near Street, in the county of Somerset, South West England, on 4 August 1642. The engagement occurred during the build-up to formal beginning of the First English Civil War on 22 August, while the Royalists and Parliamentarians were recruiting men in the county. The Royalists had established their regional headquarters in Wells, but were threatened by superior Parliamentarian numbers in the vicinity. The Royalist commander sent out a mounted patrol consisting of 60 to 80 cavalry and dragoons, which came across a force of between 500 and 600 Parliamentarian recruits travelling north across the Somerset Levels under the command of Sir John Pyne.

The Royalists set an ambush at Marshall's Elm, where the road rose out of the Levels into the Polden Hills. After a parley between the leaders was unsuccessful, the Parliamentarians were caught in the ambush. Facing musket fire from the hidden dragoons, and being charged at by the Royalist cavalry, they were routed. The Royalists killed around 27, and took 60 prisoners, including two of the Parliamentarian officers. Despite their victory, the Royalists were forced to withdraw from Wells, and later from Somerset altogether, due to their inferior numbers.

== Background ==
Conflict between the English Parliament and its monarch on religious, fiscal and legislative matters had been ongoing since at least 1603. The tension between Parliament and King Charles escalated sharply during 1642 after the King had attempted to arrest five Members of Parliament, who he accused of treason. In preparation for the likelihood of conflict with Parliament, Charles appointed the Marquess of Hertford as commander of his forces in the West Country, supported by Sir Ralph Hopton, a local Member of Parliament (MP) and an experienced army officer. Both sides were attempting to recruit the existing militia and new men into their armies. Parliament passed the Militia Ordinance in March 1642 without royal assent, granting themselves control of the militia. In response, Charles granted commissions of array to his commanders, a medieval device for levying soldiers which had not been used since 1557. One such commission was issued to Hertford, for the levying of troops in south-west England and south Wales.

Hertford chose Wells in Somerset as the Royalists' headquarters in the West Country, and they arrived in the city on 28 July. The decision was based on the fact that Wells housed the county magazine, had Royalist sympathies, and was geographically central within the area. In his 1973 book, Somerset in the Civil War, the historian David Underdown criticises the decision, citing Wells' vulnerable position in the Mendip Hills, and the strong Parliamentarian views held by the majority of Somerset's rural population. Hopton had previously acted as one of the deputy lieutenants for Somerset, making him responsible for training and leading the county's militia. Hopton's standing helped the Royalists' recruiting, but the general population of the county, many of whom were Calvinist Protestants, or worked in industries depressed by royal policies, was more sympathetic towards Parliament than the King. Broadly speaking, the Royalists were more successful in recruiting cavalry and members of the gentry; Hopton, John Digby and Francis Hawley each brought a troop of horse, but attempts to raise an infantry regiment were unsuccessful. In contrast, the Parliamentarians signed up more men, but many of these were untrained and unarmed countrymen.

On 30 July 1642, the Parliamentarians, led by William Strode, one of Parliament's deputy lieutenants in Somerset, held a meeting to collect arms at Shepton Mallet, around four miles (6 km) east-southeast of Wells. Hertford sent Hopton with his cavalry to Shepton on 1 August to confront the Parliamentarians, but he had orders to avoid conflict. When Hopton arrived in Shepton, Strode refused to listen to him, and the two scuffled. A crowd of over 1,000 had gathered, and Hopton withdrew and rejoined his cavalry outside the town. There, the Royalists and the countrymen sympathetic to the Parliamentarians faced off without fighting for several hours before the Royalists pulled back to Wells.

== Prelude ==
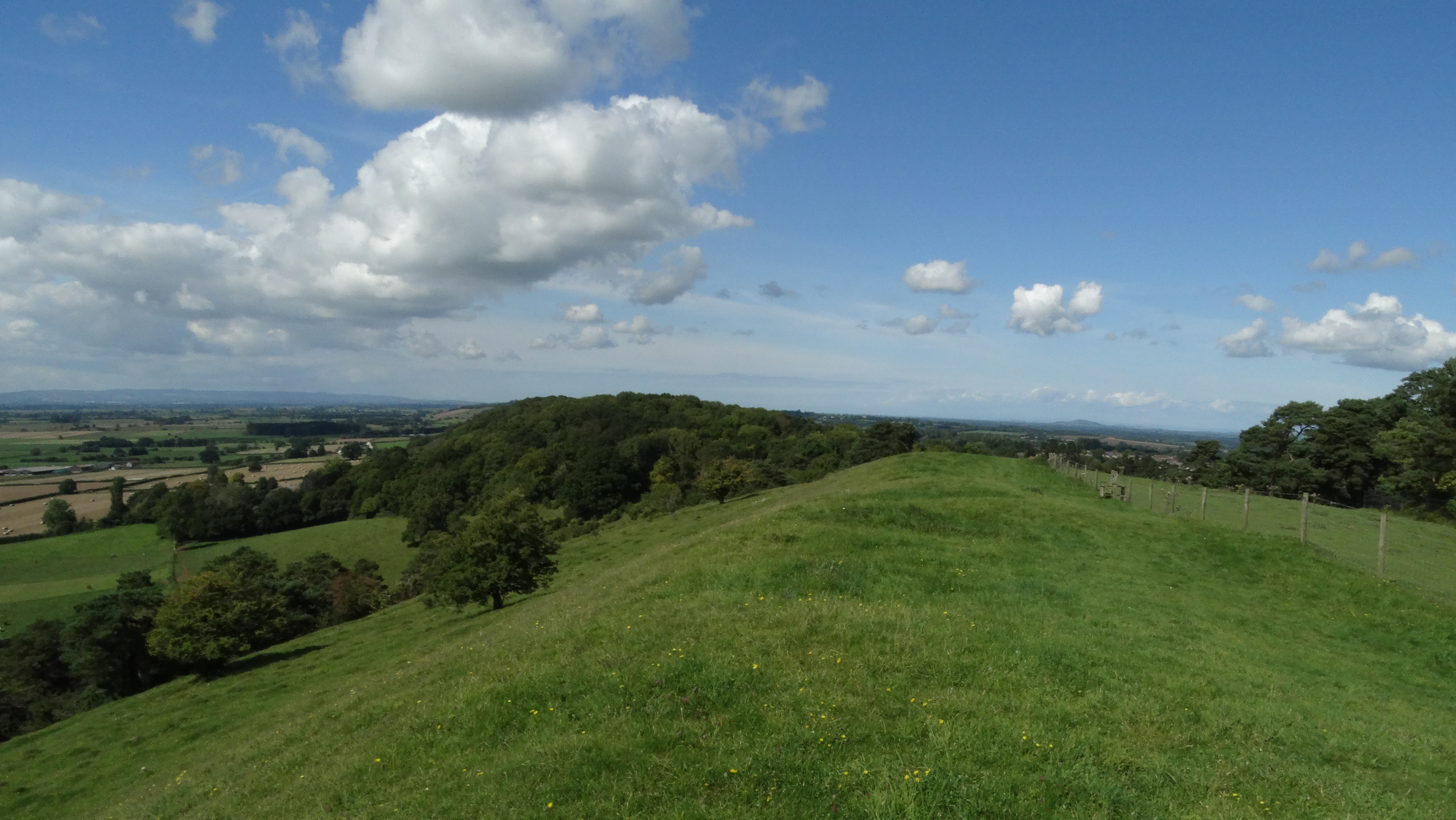
The view from Collard Hill, towards Marshall's Elm. The Parliamentarian force approached from the left, while the Royalists positioned themselves on the hills.

The success of the Parliamentarians' recruiting left the Royalists in danger of being surrounded in Wells. Sir John Pyne, an MP who had also been appointed as a deputy lieutenant of Somerset by Parliament in March, and Captain John Preston recruited around 400 men from Taunton (around 24 miles (39 km) south-west of Wells), while Captain Sands brought a further 200 from South Petherton. Pyne had orders to bring the men, described as "a few hundred farmers" by Underdown, to Street, where they would rendezvous with Strode. Hertford was wary of his weak position, and on 4 August he sent a mounted patrol out under the command of Sir John Stawell, composed of three troops of cavalry and some dragoons, numbering around 60 to 80 in all. The patrol, which also included several of the Royalist gentry and the experienced soldier Henry Lunsford, rode south through Glastonbury into the Polden Hills. On reaching the village of Marshall's Elm, just over one mile (2 km) south of Street, and around eight miles (13 km) south of Wells, the patrol spotted Pyne's force marching through cornfields about two miles (3 km) away.

== Battle ==
Having approached from the north, the Royalists had the advantage of higher ground, coming down off the Poldens. Marshall's Elm is located in a depression that acted as a pass between Ivy Thorn Hill and Collard Hill, where the road rose out of the Somerset Levels to climb into the hills. Stawell parleyed with the Parliamentarians, telling them that they could avoid conflict if they aborted their march, but to no effect. While Stawell was engaged in his discussion with the Parliamentarians, Lunsford arranged the Royalist troops; the cavalry were behind the brow of the hill, leaving just their heads and weapons visible, to disguise their numbers; fourteen dragoons dismounted and were hidden in quarry pits lower on the hill by the road. He ordered all the men to hold their fire until he led the attack with the dragoons.

Pyne initially continued the Parliamentarian march, but then changed his mind. His order to stop was met with complaints from his men, who said that the Royalist force "were but a few horse and would run away", and they continued up the hill. Pyne's men halted occasionally to fire, but Lunsford held the Royalists' fire until the enemy were within 120 paces, when the dragoons returned fire with their muskets and killed the leader of the Parliamentarian vanguard. The Parliamentarians hesitated, unsure of where the attack had come from, and Stawell led the cavalry charge down the hill. The Parliamentarians were routed; seven were killed at Marshall's Elm, and the Royalists chased some of the fleeing men for three miles (5 km), as far as Somerton. They captured sixty prisoners, who they left in Somerton. Among those captured were the two officers, Preston and Sands. As well as the seven killed at the battle, roughly another twenty died of their wounds.

== Aftermath ==
The battle provided both a tactical and strategic victory for the Royalists, leaving Hertford with an escape route from Wells should it be needed. Underdown credits their cavalry strength and leadership for the victory, highlighting that their leaders were "accustomed to command and confident of their ability to defeat larger forces of poorly officered farmers". He was particularly complimentary of Lunsford, and the experience he brought. One of the region's Parliamentarian leaders, John Ashe, said that the battle "very much daunted the honest countryman".

Despite their defeat at Marshall's Elm, the Parliamentarians continued to gather men around Wells. Groups congregated from Bristol, Gloucester, Wiltshire and throughout north-east Somerset; a range of cavalry, musketeers and countrymen wielding makeshift weapons such as pitchforks. The force, which numbered around 12,000, (Note: The Royalists suggested that there were 40,000, but in his military history of the war, Peter Gaunt dismisses this number as "improbable".) crossed the Mendip Hills and reached a slope overlooking Wells on the evening of 5 August. Pyne held joint command of part of the force with Strode. Hertford sent his cavalry to face them, and both groups agreed to a ceasefire until the next day. Overnight, the Parliamentarians' numbers were swelled by further recruits and reinforcements, and Hertford made a sham of negotiating in the morning to cover his retreat; while the Parliamentarian messengers were riding north out of Wells with his 'offer', his men fled south, covered by a cavalry rearguard led by Hopton. After spending two nights in Somerton, the Royalists withdrew out of Somerset altogether, garrisoning Sherborne Castle in Dorset.

The First English Civil War formally began on 22 August, when Charles I raised his royal standard in Nottingham. The battle at Marshall's Elm was not the only engagement to predate the formal start of the war, but the historian Peter Gaunt suggests that it was the bloodiest, while another, Charles Carlton, said that Marshall's Elm was the "first real confrontation" of the war.
