= Wimborne St Giles =

Village and civil parish in Dorset, England

Coordinates: 50.907°N 1.956°W

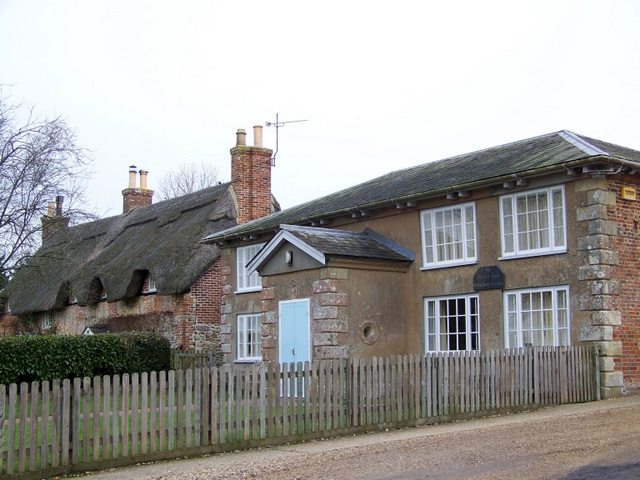
- Thatched cottages and the village hall in Wimborne St Giles

- Location within Dorset
- Population: 366
- OS grid reference: SU031119
- Civil parish: Wimborne St Giles
- Unitary authority: Dorset
- Ceremonial county: Dorset
- Region: South West
- Country: England
- Sovereign state: United Kingdom
- Post town: WIMBORNE
- Postcode district: BH21
- Dialling code: 01725
- Police: Dorset
- Fire: Dorset and Wiltshire
- Ambulance: South Western
- UK Parliament: North Dorset

Wimborne St Giles is a village and civil parish in east Dorset, England, on Cranborne Chase, 7 miles (11 km) north of Wimborne Minster and 12 miles (19 km) north of Poole. The village lies within the Shaftesbury estate, owned by the Earl of Shaftesbury. A tributary of the River Allen, formerly known as the Wimborne, snakes its way through the village.

The village of St Giles was recorded in the Domesday Book of 1086. Wimborne St Giles was established in 1733, when the St Giles and All Hallows parishes were merged at the request of Anthony Ashley-Cooper, 1st Earl of Shaftesbury. In 2001 the population was 366, served by the village hall, post office, parish church, and a primary school. Recreational enterprises include commercial shooting, a trout farm, and fly fishing on the River Allen. The village is largely agricultural, with residents generally commuting to nearby cities and towns for employment.

== History ==
Wimborne St Giles is a hundred and parish located in the wooded valley of the River Allen, near the royal hunting ground of Cranborne Chase. As originally divided, various parishes and villages resided within the hundred, including the parishes of West Woodyates, St Giles, and All Hallows. The tithing of All Hallows is located in the village, as well as the eponymous parish of Wimborne St Giles.

== St Giles House ==
Early property owners in St Giles included the Malmayne family. Matilda Malmayne, heiress of the Malmayne estate, married Edmund Plecy. Ownership of the estate encompassing the present-day St Giles House has not changed hands through purchase since the Norman Conquest. In 1375, the manor estate was known as St Giles Upwymbourne Plecy.

The Plecy male line became extinct towards the end of the 14th century, and the estate was transferred to Edmund and Matilda's descendant Joan Plecy, as heiress. Lady Joan Plecy was soon married to Sir John Hamelyn (died 1399), high sheriff of Somerset. When Hamelyn died, there were no male heirs. The estate went to Sir John's daughter Egidia, by his second wife, who married Robert Ashley. The family estate, initially known as the Ashley Manor, has belonged to the Ashleys and Ashley-Coopers ever since.

The cornerstone of St Giles House, home to the Earls of Shaftesbury, was laid by Sir Anthony Ashley-Cooper, then 2nd Baronet, later 1st Earl of Shaftesbury on 19 March 1650. The country house was built on the remains of Ashley Manor. Incorporating late medieval work in the basement and cellars, the continued construction of the main body of St Giles House was initiated in 1651.

== Parish church ==
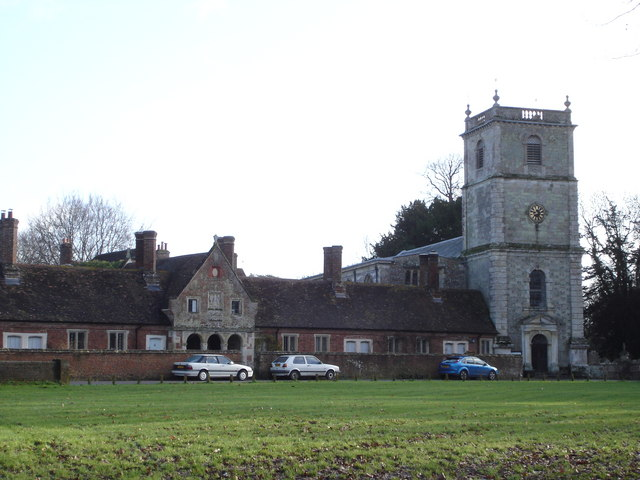
Parish church and Almshouses

When the Earl of Shaftesbury built a new country house close to St Giles, the writing was on the wall for All Hallows. In 1672, Sir Anthony wrote to the Lord Keeper of the Great Seal, offering to give Charles II a living of his choice in exchange for being allowed to close down the living of All Hallows and concentrate worship at St Giles. The 1st earl's request to the king was granted in 1733, at which time, the St Giles and All Hallows parishes were merged and took the name of Wimborne St Giles. The name is derived from the meadow stream which flows through both villages, from Old English winn and burna. Saint Giles being an 8th-century hermit of Provençal origin.

In 1742, All Hallows church was demolished, leaving only the lychgate and churchyard. While the parish was centralised in Wimborne St Giles, the churchyard at All Hallows continued to be used for burials up to the end of the 19th century, because there was no room for a burial ground at St Giles church. The church was restored in 1852. In the early 20th century, a new cemetery was opened on the opposite side of road to the All Hallows graveyard. Many of the Earls of Shaftesbury are buried in Wimborne St Giles church, in the family crypt.

== Nearest towns and villages ==
- Cranborne – 1.5 miles (2.4 km) away
- Farnham – 5.6 miles (9.0 km) away
- Tarrant Hinton – 5.8 miles (9.3 km) away
- Tarrant Rushton – 6.8 miles (10.9 km) away
- Wimborne Minster – 8.2 miles (13.2 km) away
- Blandford Forum – 9.7 miles (15.6 km) away
- Poole – 12.6 miles (20.3 km) away
- Salisbury – 12.8 miles (20.6 km) away

== Amenities ==
The village has a school, a pub called The Bull, a church, a post office and a village hall. The River Allen runs through the village. Every year the village holds a fete, which sometimes features a duck race.

The bow of Eros (properly Anteros) in Piccadilly Circus, London was originally positioned to point towards Wimborne St Giles, the country seat of the 7th Earl of Shaftesbury, in commemoration of his philanthropic works.

The church has a plaque in commemoration of robins who nested in the altar in 1887 and again in 1908.
