= George Skutt =

English merchant and politician

Member of Parliament for Poole
- In office December 1645 – December 1648

Personal details
- Born: 1580s
- Died: December 1653

George Skutt (died December 1653) was an English merchant and politician who served as Member of Parliament for Poole. He was excluded in Pride's Purge during the English Civil War.
