= Grade II* listed buildings in East Dorset =

East Dorset shown in Dorset

There are over 20,000 Grade II* listed buildings in England. This page is a list of these buildings in the district of East Dorset in Dorset.

== East Dorset ==
Name	Location	Type	Completed (Note: The date given is the date used by Historic England as significant for the initial building or that of an important part in the structure's description.)	Date designated	Grid ref. (Note: The grid reference is based on the British national grid reference system, sometimes known as OSGB36, used by the Ordnance Survey.) Geo-coordinates	Entry number (Note: The "List Entry Number" is a unique number assigned to each listed building and scheduled monument by Historic England.)	Image
Church of St Michael and All Angels	Colehill	Parish church	1893–5	30 October 1987	SU0247701213; 50°48′38″N 1°57′58″W	1323528	Church of St Michael and All Angels More images
Wilksworth Farmhouse	Colehill	Farmhouse	c. 1500	18 March 1955	SU0073601896; 50°49′00″N 1°59′27″W	1120076	Upload Photo
Church of St Hubert	Corfe Mullen	Parish church	13th century	18 March 1955	SY9767098350; 50°47′05″N 2°02′04″W	1303916	Church of St Hubert More images
Court House	Corfe Mullen	House	Late 16th century	18 March 1955	SY9764098595; 50°47′13″N 2°02′05″W	1120081	Court House More images
Carriage house approximately 80m north of Cranborne Lodge	Cranborne	Carriage house	Mid 19th century	18 March 1955	SU0561913224; 50°55′06″N 1°55′17″W	1120180	Upload Photo
Cranborne Lodge	Cranborne	Country house	c. 1700	18 March 1955	SU0559913136; 50°55′04″N 1°55′18″W	1304284	Cranborne Lodge More images
Gatehouse and south courtyard walls to Cranborne Manor House	Cranborne	Gatehouse	Early 17th century	18 March 1955	SU0531413182; 50°55′05″N 1°55′33″W	1304268	Upload Photo
Church of St Nicholas	Edmondsham	Parish church	14th century	18 March 1955	SU0611811543; 50°54′12″N 1°54′52″W	1154150	Church of St Nicholas More images
Edmondsham House	Edmondsham	Country house	1589	18 March 1955	SU0615511611; 50°54′14″N 1°54′50″W	1303958	Edmondsham House More images
Church of All Saints	Hampreston, Ferndown	Parish church	14th century	18 March 1955	SZ0551898805; 50°47′20″N 1°55′23″W	1303912	Church of All Saints More images
Little Moors Farmhouse	Hampreston, Ferndown	Farmhouse	c. 1700	30 October 1987	SZ0538299612; 50°47′46″N 1°55′30″W	1120046	Little Moors Farmhouse
Abbey House	Horton	House	c. 1500	18 March 1955	SU0302407398; 50°51′58″N 1°57′30″W	1120088	Upload Photo
Horton Tower	Horton	Tower		18 March 1955	SU0304106743; 50°51′37″N 1°57′29″W	1120082	Horton Tower More images
Stanbridge Bridge	Horton	Road bridge	Possibly medieval	18 March 1955	SU0137608878; 50°52′46″N 1°58′55″W	1323533	Stanbridge Bridge More images
Chapel of St Margaret and St Anthony	Pamphill	Leper hospital chapel	13th century	18 March 1955	SU0041500364; 50°48′10″N 1°59′44″W	1304525	Chapel of St Margaret and St Anthony
High Hall	Pamphill	House	c. 1670	18 March 1955	SU0008302806; 50°49′29″N 2°00′01″W	1119507	Upload Photo
Lodge Farm House	Pamphill	House	Late 14th century	18 March 1955	ST9743102147; 50°49′08″N 2°02′16″W	1119474	Lodge Farm House More images
Obelisk 140m south west of Kingston Lacy House	Kingston Lacy, Pamphill	Obelisk	2nd century BC, relocated 1827	18 March 1955	ST9779201128; 50°48′35″N 2°01′58″W	1323828	Obelisk 140m south west of Kingston Lacy House More images
Pamphill Manor House	Pamphill Green, Pamphill	House	Late 17th century	18 March 1955	ST9898700628; 50°48′19″N 2°00′57″W	1120195	Pamphill Manor House
Church of St Mary	Sixpenny Handley	Parish church	14th century	18 March 1955	ST9955617304; 50°57′19″N 2°00′28″W	1153750	Church of St Mary More images
West Woodyates Manor	Sixpenny Handley and Pentridge	House		18 March 1955	SU0162619491; 50°58′29″N 1°58′42″W	1153726	West Woodyates Manor More images
Almer Manor	Almer, Sturminster Marshall	House	c. 1600	18 March 1955	SY9140898975; 50°47′25″N 2°07′24″W	1120056	Almer Manor More images
Church of St Mary the Virgin	Sturminster Marshall	Parish church	12th century	18 March 1955	ST9512100402; 50°48′11″N 2°04′14″W	1154649	Church of St Mary the Virgin More images
Henbury Hall/Henbury House	Henbury, Sturminster Marshall	Country house	18th century	18 March 1955	SY9567598223; 50°47′01″N 2°03′46″W	1120055	Upload Photo
Church of All Saints and St Mark	West Parley	Parish church	12th century	18 March 1955	SZ0865196844; 50°46′16″N 1°52′43″W	1120037	Church of All Saints and St Mark More images
Barclays Bank, 1 The Square	Wimborne Minster	House	18th century	14 June 1952	SU0092500091; 50°48′01″N 1°59′18″W	1323777	Barclays Bank, 1 The Square More images
Old Manor Farmhouse	Wimborne Minster	House	16th century origin	14 June 1952	SZ0217899956; 50°47′57″N 1°58′14″W	1323810	Old Manor Farmhouse More images
Priest's House Museum	Wimborne Minster	Hall house	Late 16th or early 17th century	14 June 1952	SZ0097199994; 50°47′58″N 1°59′15″W	1153246	Priest's House Museum More images
Walford Bridge	Wimborne Minster	Bridge	Early 16th century	14 June 1952	SU0094200637; 50°48′19″N 1°59′17″W	1119538	Walford Bridge More images
Wimborne Book Shop	Wimborne Minster	House	18th century	14 June 1952	SU0081700032; 50°47′59″N 1°59′23″W	1323823	Wimborne Book Shop More images
Wimborne Conservative Club	Wimborne Minster	House	Late 18th to early 19th century	14 June 1952	SU0092800140; 50°48′03″N 1°59′18″W	1153779	Wimborne Conservative Club More images
43 West Borough	Wimborne Minster	House	18th century	14 June 1952	SU0088400289; 50°48′08″N 1°59′20″W	1153942	Upload Photo
Almshouses including front wall	Wimborne St Giles	Almshouses	c. 1624	18 March 1955	SU0317011983; 50°54′26″N 1°57′23″W	1304115	Almshouses including front wall More images
Grotto 250 metres south east of St Giles House	St Giles House, Wimborne St Giles	Grotto	1750s	3 April 1986	SU0344811422; 50°54′08″N 1°57′08″W	1120131	Grotto 250 metres south east of St Giles House More images
Home Farm Buildings approximately 150 metres north east of St Giles House	St Giles House, Wimborne St Giles	Farm buildings	Early 16th century	3 April 1986	SU0330511698; 50°54′17″N 1°57′16″W	1120130	Upload Photo
Abbey House	Witchampton	Manor house	Early 16th century	18 March 1955	ST9890206403; 50°51′26″N 2°01′01″W	1155304	Abbey House More images
Church of St Mary, St Cuthberga and All Saints	Witchampton	Parish church	15th-century tower	18 March 1955	ST9885506440; 50°51′27″N 2°01′03″W	1323503	Church of St Mary, St Cuthberga and All Saints More images
Ruins of Knowlton Church	Knowlton, Woodlands	Parish church	12th-century origin	18 March 1955	SU0238410282; 50°53′31″N 1°58′03″W	1120071	Ruins of Knowlton Church More images
Woodlands Farm House	Woodlands	Farmhouse	Early 18th century	18 March 1955	SU0458808203; 50°52′24″N 1°56′10″W	1303380	Upload Photo

== See also ==
- Grade I listed buildings in Dorset
- Grade II* listed buildings in Dorset
