= Grade II* listed buildings in Christchurch =

Christchurch shown in Dorset

There are over 20,000 Grade II* listed buildings in England. This page is a list of these buildings in the district of Christchurch in Dorset.

== Listed buildings ==
Name	Location	Type	Completed (Note: The date given is the date used by Historic England as significant for the initial building or that of an important part in the structure's description.)	Date designated	Grid ref. (Note: Sometimes known as OSGB36, the grid reference is based on the British national grid reference system used by the Ordnance Survey.) Geo-coordinates	Entry number (Note: The "List Entry Number" is a unique number assigned to each listed building and scheduled monument by Historic England.)	Image
Burton Hall	Burton	House	c.1750	30 September 1964	SZ1654595192; 50°45′22″N 1°46′01″W	1154370	Burton Hall More images
Hurn Court	Hurn	House	End of 16th century	30 September 1964	SZ1214895935; 50°45′46″N 1°49′45″W	1324679	Upload Photo
Church Hatch	Christchurch	House	18th century	14 October 1953	SZ1597592616; 50°43′59″N 1°46′30″W	1324652	Church Hatch More images
Gateway to Christchurch churchyard	Christchurch Priory	Gate	19th century	12 February 1976	SZ1597492594; 50°43′58″N 1°46′30″W	1304357	Gateway to Christchurch churchyard
Greystones	Highcliffe	House	1911–12	25 July 1974	SZ2165493390; 50°44′23″N 1°41′40″W	1324690	Greystones
Place Mill	Christchurch Priory	Watermill	Medieval	14 October 1953	SZ1600192395; 50°43′51″N 1°46′29″W	1110074	Place Mill More images
Priory Cottage	Christchurch Priory	Porters' lodge	Restored early 16th century	14 October 1975	SZ1596192502; 50°43′55″N 1°46′31″W	1303953	Priory Cottage More images
Railings, gate and wall at No 13 (Church Hatch)	Christchurch	Railings	18th century	12 February 1976	SZ1597292606; 50°43′58″N 1°46′30″W	1110139	Railings, gate and wall at No 13 (Church Hatch)
Red House Museum	Christchurch	Workhouse	1764	14 October 1953	SZ1589092560; 50°43′57″N 1°46′34″W	1110072	Red House Museum More images
The Moorings	Mudeford	House	18th century	14 October 1953	SZ1828692064; 50°43′40″N 1°44′32″W	1153839	Upload Photo
Tyneham House	Christchurch	House	18th century	14 October 1953	SZ1614292801; 50°44′05″N 1°46′21″W	1108183	Tyneham House More images
3 Bridge Street	Christchurch	Shop	Early 19th century	14 October 1953	SZ1611992767; 50°44′03″N 1°46′23″W	1325061	3 Bridge Street More images

== See also ==
- Listed buildings in Christchurch, Dorset
- Grade I listed buildings in Dorset
- Grade II* listed buildings in Dorset
  - Grade II* listed buildings in Bournemouth
  - Grade II* listed buildings in East Dorset
  - Grade II* listed buildings in North Dorset
  - Grade II* listed buildings in Poole (borough)
  - Grade II* listed buildings in Purbeck (district)
  - Grade II* listed buildings in West Dorset
  - Grade II* listed buildings in Weymouth and Portland
