= Grade II* listed buildings in Purbeck (district) =

Purbeck shown in Dorset

There are over 20,000 Grade II* listed buildings in England. This page is a list of these buildings in the district of Purbeck in Dorset.

== Purbeck ==
Name	Location	Type	Completed (Note: The date given is the date used by Historic England as significant for the initial building or that of an important part in the structure's description.)	Date designated	Grid ref. (Note: The grid reference is based on the British national grid reference system, sometimes known as OSGB36, used by the Ordnance Survey.) Geo-coordinates	Entry number (Note: The "List Entry Number" is a unique number assigned to each listed building and scheduled monument by Historic England.)	Image
First World War Memorial	Affpuddle	Cross	1918	2 October 1984	SY8128593292; 50°44′20″N 2°16′00″W	1171702	First World War Memorial More images
Brewhouse and Ice House at Bloxworth House, Approximately 30 M South of House	Bloxworth	Brewhouse	Probably mid 17th century	28 March 1984	SY8794794961; 50°45′15″N 2°10′20″W	1120570	Upload Photo
Pump House at Bloxworth House, Approximately 50 Metres South South East of the House	Bloxworth	Pump house	Late 17th to early 18th century	28 March 1984	SY8798094918; 50°45′13″N 2°10′18″W	1323294	Upload Photo
Stables at Bloxworth House, Approximately 10 Metres East of the House	Bloxworth	Stable	1669	20 November 1959	SY8798194962; 50°45′15″N 2°10′18″W	1323275	Upload Photo
The Grange	East Chaldon, Chaldon Herring	House	16th century	20 November 1959	SY7904483101; 50°38′50″N 2°17′52″W	1120524	Upload Photo
Parish Church of Saint Peter	Church Knowle	Parish church	14th century	20 November 1959	SY9407881938; 50°38′14″N 2°05′06″W	1303812	Parish Church of Saint Peter More images
North Lodges Lulworth Castle	Coombe Keynes	Gate lodge	1785	2 October 1984	SY8483183344; 50°38′58″N 2°12′57″W	1323333	North Lodges Lulworth Castle More images
Encombe House	Encombe, Corfe Castle	Country house	Probably 17th century	20 November 1959	SY9445378571; 50°36′25″N 2°04′47″W	1230202	Encombe House More images
Furzeman's House	Corfe Castle	Cross passage house	Late medieval	20 November 1959	SY9596381805; 50°38′09″N 2°03′30″W	1230731	Furzeman's House More images
Morton's House. Including Attached Outbuildings and Front Boundary Wall	Corfe Castle	Manor house	Late 16th to early 17th century	20 November 1959	SY9614682027; 50°38′17″N 2°03′21″W	1229002	Morton's House. Including Attached Outbuildings and Front Boundary Wall More images
Parish Church of Saint Edward	The Square, Corfe Castle	Parish church	15th century tower	20 November 1959	SY9605682050; 50°38′17″N 2°03′26″W	1278555	Parish Church of Saint Edward More images
Scoles Farm House, Including Attached Outbuilding at Rear, and Boundary Wall and Gate to Front Garden	Lynch, Corfe Castle	Farmhouse	Early 17th century	20 November 1959	SY9637079957; 50°37′10″N 2°03′10″W	1120229	Upload Photo
The Old Town Hall	Corfe Castle	Town hall	c. 1774	20 November 1959	SY9603282053; 50°38′17″N 2°03′27″W	1121006	The Old Town Hall More images
The Town House	The Square, Corfe Castle	House	Late 18th century	20 November 1959	SY9603482072; 50°38′18″N 2°03′27″W	1230601	The Town House More images
Parish Church of St Andrew	Lulworth Park, East Lulworth	Parish church	Tower late 15th century	20 November 1959	SY8537682079; 50°38′18″N 2°12′29″W	1120466	Parish Church of St Andrew More images
Park Lodge	East Lulworth	Detached house	17th century	2 October 1984	SY8515483089; 50°38′50″N 2°12′41″W	1172531	Upload Photo
Holme Bridge	East Stoke	Bridge	Early 17th century	20 November 1959	SY8904986652; 50°40′46″N 2°09′23″W	1120572	Holme Bridge More images
Wool Bridge That Part in the Parish of East Stoke	East Stoke	Bridge	16th century	20 November 1959	SY8445187160; 50°41′02″N 2°13′17″W	1171233	Wool Bridge That Part in the Parish of East Stoke More images
Woolbridge Manor	East Stoke	Manor house	Early 17th century	20 November 1959	SY8440387203; 50°41′03″N 2°13′20″W	1323300	Woolbridge Manor More images
Smedmore House	Smedmore, Kimmeridge	Manor house	18th century	20 November 1959	SY9241578855; 50°36′34″N 2°06′31″W	1305067	Smedmore House More images
Post Green House	Lytchett Minster	Country house	Mid to late 18th century	20 November 1952	SY9579393515; 50°44′28″N 2°03′40″W	1120334	Post Green House More images
Saint Aldhelm's Church	Pit Bottom, Lytchett Minster	Private chapel	1898	30 August 1984	SY9692294514; 50°45′01″N 2°02′42″W	1120333	Saint Aldhelm's Church More images
Charborough Tower	Charborough Park, Morden	Tower	1790	20 November 1959	SY9292397558; 50°46′39″N 2°06′06″W	1120555	Charborough Tower More images
Home Farm House	Morden	House	Late 16th century origin	24 March 1971	SY9164395570; 50°45′35″N 2°07′11″W	1171734	Upload Photo
Parish Church of Saint Mary, Charborough	Charborough Park, Morden	Parish church	1775	20 November 1959	SY9251597852; 50°46′49″N 2°06′27″W	1120553	Parish Church of Saint Mary, Charborough More images
Peacock Lodge Including Gate Piers and Gates	Charborough Park, Morden	Lodge	Late 18th to early 19th century	28 March 1984	SY9194198482; 50°47′09″N 2°06′56″W	1323289	Upload Photo
Parish Church of Ss Magnus the Martyr and Nicholas of Myra	Moreton	Parish church	1776	20 November 1959	SY8054089281; 50°42′10″N 2°16′37″W	1172650	Parish Church of Ss Magnus the Martyr and Nicholas of Myra More images
Chapel of St John the Evangelist (Creech Grange)	Steeple	Chapel of ease	1746	20 November 1959	SY9106282424; 50°38′29″N 2°07′40″W	1323359	Chapel of St John the Evangelist (Creech Grange) More images
Grange Arch	Steeple	Arch	18th century, before 1746	20 November 1959	SY9126081777; 50°38′08″N 2°07′30″W	1120456	Grange Arch More images
The Manor House, Including the Wall and Gate Piers Extending North West from the South West End of the Main Block	Steeple	Detached house	c. 1600 origin	20 November 1959	SY9116881055; 50°37′45″N 2°07′34″W	1120422	The Manor House, Including the Wall and Gate Piers Extending North West from the South West End of the Main Block More images
Church of Saint Mary	Brownsea Island, Studland	Parish church	1854	13 December 1984	SZ0282287772; 50°41′23″N 1°57′41″W	1323430	Church of Saint Mary More images
Newton Manor	Swanage	Farmhouse	Probably 18th century	26 June 1952	SZ0204778934; 50°36′36″N 1°58′21″W	1119898	Upload Photo
Black Bear Hotel	Wareham	Hotel	Mid 18th century	7 May 1952	SY9233987292; 50°41′07″N 2°06′35″W	1323601	Black Bear Hotel More images
Clouds Hill (Lawrence of Arabia's Cottage)	Clouds Hill, Wareham	House	1808	12 November 1959	SY8237690910; 50°43′03″N 2°15′04″W	1120423	Clouds Hill (Lawrence of Arabia's Cottage) More images
No 22 (St Michaels House)	Wareham	House	Mid 18th century	8 April 1976	SY9221187337; 50°41′08″N 2°06′42″W	1119949	No 22 (St Michaels House) More images
Streche's Almhouses	Wareham	Almshouse	1741	7 May 1952	SY9237187380; 50°41′10″N 2°06′34″W	1120010	Streche's Almhouses More images
The Priory of Lady St Mary Including Walls Immediately to West	Wareham	House	Early 16th century	7 May 1952	SY9249387166; 50°41′03″N 2°06′27″W	1120030	The Priory of Lady St Mary Including Walls Immediately to West More images
41 West Street	Wareham	Shop	18th century	7 May 1952	SY9216687307; 50°41′07″N 2°06′44″W	1323584	41 West Street More images
12 South Street	Wareham	Shop	18th century	7 May 1952	SY9233887300; 50°41′07″N 2°06′35″W	1153507	12 South Street More images
12 West Street	Wareham	Shop	18th century	7 May 1952	SY9224987354; 50°41′09″N 2°06′40″W	1119948	12 West Street More images
Little Bindon	West Lulworth	Chapel	Early 13th century origin	20 November 1959	SY8305279861; 50°37′06″N 2°14′27″W	1323346	Upload Photo
Manor House	Winfrith Newburgh	House	Late 16th century origin	20 November 1959	SY8053784418; 50°39′33″N 2°16′36″W	1152783	Manor House More images
Parish Church of St Christopher	Winfrith Newburgh	Parish church	15th century tower	20 November 1959	SY8051284351; 50°39′31″N 2°16′37″W	1120390	Parish Church of St Christopher More images
Winfrith House	Winfrith Newburgh	House	18th century	20 November 1959	SY8068584622; 50°39′39″N 2°16′29″W	1120384	Upload Photo
Bindon Abbey House	Wool	House	c. 1794	20 November 1959	SY8465986877; 50°40′53″N 2°13′07″W	1120359	Bindon Abbey House More images
Gatehouse at Bindon Abbey House	Wool	Gatehouse	c. 1794	20 November 1959	SY8530586747; 50°40′49″N 2°12′34″W	1259827	Upload Photo
Parish Church of the Holy Rood	Wool	Parish church	13th century	20 November 1959	SY8475086463; 50°40′39″N 2°13′02″W	1120365	Parish Church of the Holy Rood More images
Wool Bridge	Wool	Bridge	16th century	20 November 1959	SY8445587149; 50°41′02″N 2°13′17″W	1323368	Wool Bridge More images
Dunshay Manor House	Worth Matravers	Manor house	Late 16th to early 17th century origin	20 November 1959	SY9808479638; 50°36′59″N 2°01′42″W	1120292	Upload Photo

== See also ==
- Grade I listed buildings in Dorset
