= Grade II* listed buildings in Dorset =

Districts of Dorset 1974-2019
1 Weymouth and Portland
2 West Dorset
3 North Dorset
4 Purbeck
5 East Dorset
6 Christchurch
7 Bournemouth (Unitary)
8 Poole (Unitary)

The county of Dorset is divided into 2 districts (before 2019 there were 8). The districts of Dorset were Weymouth and Portland, West Dorset, North Dorset, Purbeck, East Dorset, Christchurch, and the unitary authorities Bournemouth and Poole.

As there are 508 Grade II* listed buildings in the county they have been split into separate lists for each former district.

- Bournemouth, Christchurch and Poole
  - Grade II* listed buildings in Bournemouth
  - Grade II* listed buildings in Christchurch
  - Grade II* listed buildings in Poole (borough)
- Dorset (unitary authority)
  - Grade II* listed buildings in East Dorset
  - Grade II* listed buildings in North Dorset
  - Grade II* listed buildings in Purbeck (district)
  - Grade II* listed buildings in West Dorset
  - Grade II* listed buildings in Weymouth and Portland

== See also ==
- Grade I listed buildings in Dorset
- Grade II listed buildings in Dorset
- Category:Grade II* listed buildings in Dorset
