= Woodlands, Dorset =

Village and civil parish in Dorset, England

Coordinates: 50.881°N 1.928°W

Woodlands
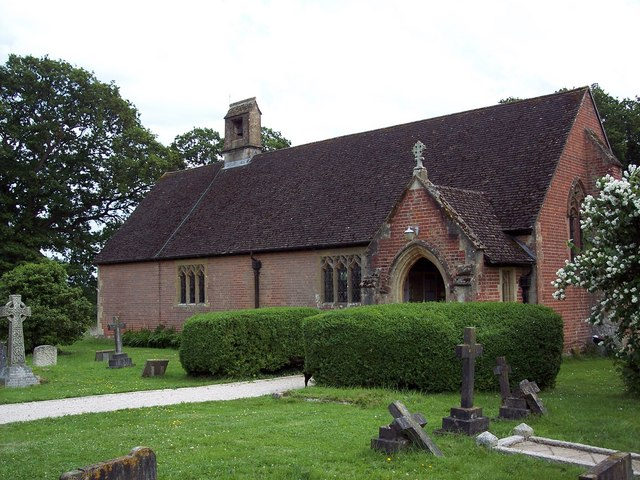
- The Church of the Ascension, Woodlands

- Location within Dorset
- Population: 522 2011 Census
- OS grid reference: SU051090
- Civil parish: Woodlands
- Unitary authority: Dorset
- Ceremonial county: Dorset
- Region: South West
- Country: England
- Sovereign state: United Kingdom
- Post town: WIMBORNE
- Postcode district: BH21
- Dialling code: 01202
- Police: Dorset
- Fire: Dorset and Wiltshire
- Ambulance: South Western
- UK Parliament: North Dorset

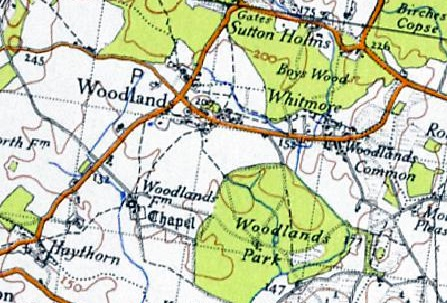
A historical map of Woodlands, Dorset in 1945

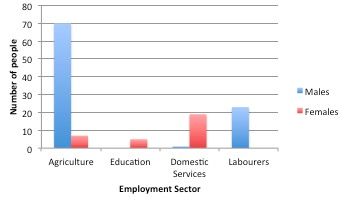
Graph showing the occupational structure in Woodlands in 1881

Woodlands is a village and civil parish in Dorset, South-West England. It is five miles (8 km) north of Wimborne Minster.

The village is home to the Church of the Ascension which is a Grade II listed building. In 2001, the parish had a population of 544 but in 2011 the number had fallen to 522.

== The village ==
=== Demography ===
The population grew from 346 in 1811 to 476 in 1851 and then declined to 384 in 1911 but grew from a low point of 323 in 1951 to reach 544 in the 2001 census. In 2011, the village had a population of 522, 272 males and 250 females; the majority (504) were white British and Christianity (334) was the main religion.

In 1831 the majority of the population (67) were employed as agricultural labourers, and in 1881 that had increased to 70.

=== Housing ===
In 2017, the average house price in Woodlands was £447,735 which is more than in neighbouring Verwood (£332,770) and Three Legged Cross (£352,353) but cheaper than nearby Holt (£699,607).

=== Recreation ===
Remedy Oak golf club is south of the village.

=== Parish church ===
Woodlands is home to the Anglican Church of the Ascension, a Grade II listed building. The church is in the Diocese of Salisbury. The church was dedicated in 1892 and was given to the village by Harriet, the Countess of Shaftesbury, in memory of her husband Anthony who was the 8th Earl of Shaftesbury. The church was designed by prolific church architect George Frederick Bodley who designed cathedrals in Tasmania and Washington. The exterior of the church is in plain brick. Inside are three central columns arcading down the middle of the nave. On entering the church there is a large 12th-century circular stone font from Knowlton church (two miles west) which, according to tradition, was used for baptisms by Saint Aldhelm.

== History ==
Woodlands parish was established when the hamlets of Baggeridge, Woodlands and Knowlton (the earliest settlement) were detached from Horton in the 19th century. Woodlands village was then first recorded in 1244. Woodlands was part of the Shaftesbury estate until after the Second World war.

The parish is home to the hamlet of Knowlton with its prehistoric henges known as Knowlton Circles.

In 1870-72 John Marius Wilson's Imperial Gazetteer of England and Wales said that in Woodlands:

"The Duke of Monmouth, after the battle of Sedgemoor, was taken here in a ditch."

The village is mentioned in 'Owen's book of fairs' in 1788 as having a yearly fair selling horses, cheese and toys on 5 July.

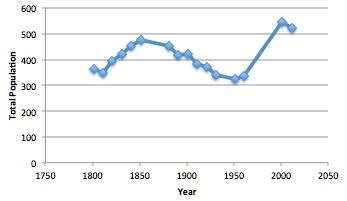
Graph showing total population change in Woodlands between 1801 and 2011.
