= Bloxworth House =

Grade I listed house in Dorset, England

Coordinates: 50°45′15″N 2°10′21″W

Bloxworth House is a Grade I listed manor house just northwest of the village of Bloxworth in Dorset, England. It was built in 1608 by George Savage and was the first brick building in Dorset.

== History ==
Bloxworth House was built in 1608 by George Savage and was the first building in Dorset to be built mainly of brick. In 1689 it was bought by Henry Trenchard – whose family also owned Poxwell Manor, and it remained in the Trenchard family until 1964. Over the last 100 years the house fell into ruins, was vandalized and then restored.

The house was used as the Bathsheba Everdene's house in the acclaimed 1967 film adaptation of Far from the Madding Crowd. It was considerably and sympathetically restored in the 1970s. The present owner, horticulturalist Martin Lane Fox, acquired the house in 1997 and has considerably remodelled the garden. The house is currently being sold (2014).

== Description ==
The two-storey building was first listed in 1959 and is described by Historic England as a "countryhouse". There is a date stone inscribed "1608" in the porch. The building originally had an E-shaped plan, but was altered during the 18th and 19th centuries. It has brick walls, with some burnt header decoration, on a stone plinth. The roofs are tiled with stone eaves courses and coped gables. There are brick stacks on the roof ridge and gables and the house has projecting gabled wings at each end. Also separately listed are a stable block, a pump house, a brewhouse and an ice house.
