= Corfe Castle Town Hall =

Municipal building in Corfe Castle, Dorset, England

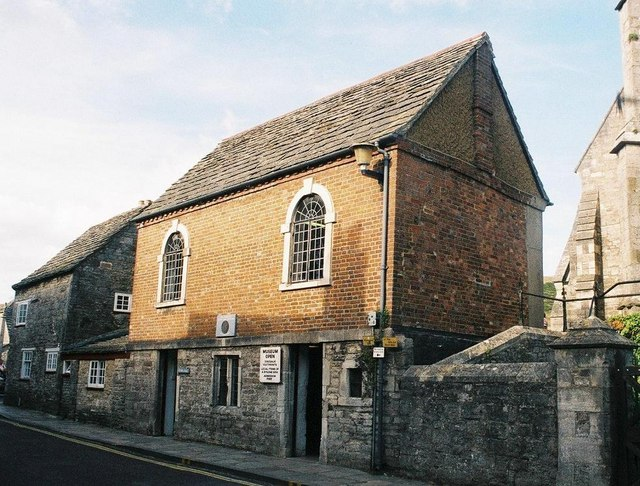
- Corfe Castle Town Hall

- Shown in Dorset
- 50.6381°N 2.0575°W
- Location: West Street, Corfe Castle

History
- Built: 1774

Site notes
- Architectural style: Vernacular style

Listed Building – Grade II*
- Official name: The Old Town Hall
- Designated: 20 November 1959
- Reference no.: 1121006

Corfe Castle Town Hall is a municipal building in West Street, Corfe Castle, Dorset, England. The town hall, which is currently used as a museum, is a Grade II* listed building.

== History ==
The ground floor of the building incorporates the remains of a thatched cottage, built with stone taken from Corfe Castle, and burnt down in 1680. The town hall was commissioned by the lord of the manor, Henry Bankes the Younger, whose seat was at Kingston Lacy, as a meeting place for the borough council of Corfe Castle although ownership of the building was subsequently retained by the Bankes family.

The building was designed in the Vernacular style, built in rubble masonry (on the ground floor) and red brick with stone dressings (on the first floor), and was completed in around 1774. It was built into the earth bank behind. The design involved a broadly symmetrical main frontage of two bays facing onto West Street. There were two square headed doorways on the ground floor, with a bi-partite mullioned window between them and a small square window to the right. The first floor was fenestrated by two round headed windows with stone architraves and keystones. Internally the principal room was the council chamber on the first floor. A lock-up for petty criminals was established on the ground floor of the building.

The building also became the venue for the meetings, held on Shrove Tuesday each year, of the local quarrymen, properly referred to as "the Company of Marblers within the Town of Corfe Castle". Under the terms of an ancient charter, they were required to meet annually to maintain their ownership over the local marble quarries. This involved appointing new freemen (who needed to be legitimate descendants of exiting freemen) and electing officers.

Corfe Castle had a very small electorate and a dominant patron (Henry Bankes), which meant it was recognised by the UK Parliament as a rotten borough. Its right to elect members of parliament was removed by the Reform Act 1832, and its borough council, which had met in the town hall, was abolished under the Municipal Corporations Act 1883. The building was transferred to a specially formed entity, the Corfe Castle Town Trust, in 1889. The trust subsequently converted the building into a museum to exhibit aspects of local history, including dinosaur footprints and the borough mace.

A major programme of repair works, financed by a fund-raising campaign led by the journalist, Jon Snow, and costing £100,000, involved the restoration of the walls at the back of the building, and was completed in 2006.

== See also ==
- Grade II* listed buildings in Purbeck (district)
