= Bob Roberts (folksinger) =

British singer and writer

Alfred William "Bob" Roberts (1907–1982) was a British folk singer, songwriter, storyteller, bargeman, author, and journalist. He was the last captain of a British commercial vessel operating under sail, and brought to an end a centuries-old tradition.

== Life ==
Alfred William Roberts was born in the village of Hampreston, Dorset where his parents taught in the village school. Roberts's father, who was brought up in North Wales, ran the church choir as well as playing the piano, church organ, melodeon, concertina and fiddle for village dances. These musical interests led Ralph Vaughan Williams to visit him at the village.

Roberts attended Wimborne Grammar School on a choral scholarship. After leaving school at 17, he eventually became a journalist at the Orpington Gazette, before moving to work as a sports reporter for the Daily Mail on Fleet Street. Robert found it difficult to settle at his job at the Mail, and twice took off on long sea voyages. Finally he left the newspaper to work on a Thames sailing barge. Apart from a short stint as a sub-editor at the East Anglian Daily Times in the late forties, Roberts would work on eight barges over the next 35 years, initially as a mate and on his final five boats, as skipper. His other voyages at sea would take him to the West Indies, Ascension Island, West Africa and Brazil.

In 1940 Roberts married his wife, Amelia or ‘Toni’, whom he had first met in the late 1920s, and in 1949 they moved to Pin Mill, on the River Orwell. And it was while working at East Anglian Times that F.T. Everard and Sons offered Roberts the captaincy of the Cambria, the Thames sailing barge he was to make famous.

Working as a bargeman allowed Roberts to collect songs from bargemen and others he met along the East Anglian coast, which he added to his repertoire of his own songs. Working on barges also affected Roberts literary output, because even as a skipper his wages didn’t support his family, which included two daughters. So, he supplemented his income by writing books and articles, often while waiting for good seagoing conditions.

Roberts had a good selection of songs by the 1950s, when he met the folklorist Peter Kennedy. Kennedy was making field recordings for the English Folk Dance and Song Society and the BBC, and together they recorded some of Robert’s folk singing contacts for the BBC folk programme As I Roved Out and the folk music radio programme Song Hunter, produced by a young David Attenborough and presented by the American folk musicologist Alan Lomax, as well as being recorded by the BBC Folk Music and Dialect Recording Scheme that was led by Kennedy.

From the 1950s onwards, Roberts appeared in folk clubs and festivals. He gained the reputation as a great story teller, distinctive singer and charismatic personality. In 1966, Roberts read five seafaring stories on the BBC children's programme Jackanory.

As Thames Barges became increasingly economically unfeasible, Everards offered to sell Roberts the Cambria, which he ran as owner-skipper between 1966 and 1970, when it was finally sold to the Maritime Trust. He then bought a replacement, a small motor coaster called the Vectis Isle, in which he carried various cargoes (china clay from Cornwall, coke, soya beans, grain, scrap metal, etc.) around the UK and over to the Continent.

In the 1970s Roberts and his wife moved to live on the Isle of Wight, where he made his last two records, as well as joining in sing-alongs. After Toni died in 1978, Roberts married his second wife Sheila (née Blackburn).

Bob Roberts died in 1982 at the age of 74.

== Music ==
- Songs from the Sailing Barges, Topic Records 12TS361, 1978
- Breeze for a Bargeman, Solent Records SS054, 1981
- Ballads, Complaintes et Shanties des Matelots Anglais (Various Artists: Chants de Marins IV – 2 tracks), Le Chasse-Marée SCM005, 1984
- Sea Songs and Shanties (Various Artists - 14 tracks recorded by Peter Kennedy), Saydisc CD-SDL 405, 1994
- Hidden English (1 track), Topic Records TSCD600, 1996
- My Ship Shall Sail the Ocean (the Voice of the People series Vol. 2 - 1 track), Topic Records TSCD652, 1998
- To Catch a Fine Buck Was My Delight (The Voice of the People series Vol. 17 - 1 track), Topic Records TSCD668, 1998

== Books ==
- Breeze for a Bargeman, Bob Roberts, Seafarer Books 0954275063
- Last of the Sailormen, Bob Roberts, Seafarer Books 0953818047
- Coasting Bargemaster, Bob Roberts, Seafarer Books 0953818012
- Rough and Tumble, Bob Roberts, Seafarer Books 0953818098
- A Slice of Suffolk, Bob Roberts, Terence Dalton Ltd 0861380207

== Biography ==
- The Last Sailorman, Dick Durham, Terence Dalton Ltd 0861380673
