= Knowlton Circles =

Neolithic henge monument in Dorset, England

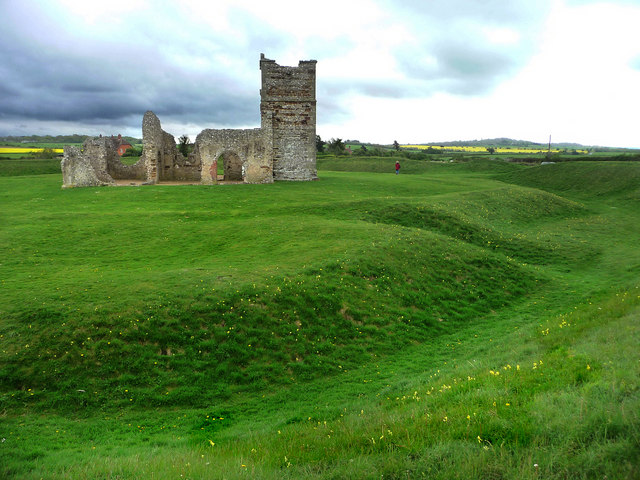
- Church Henge

- Location within Dorset
- 50°53′31″N 1°58′03″W
- Type: Henge
- Periods: Neolithic
- Location: Knowlton, Dorset

Site notes
- Owner: English Heritage
- Public access: Open any reasonable time during daylight hours
- Website: https://www.english-heritage.org.uk/visit/places/knowlton-church-and-earthworks/

Scheduled monument
- Official name: Group of henge monuments, an associated group of round barrows, a Saxon cemetery, and a Norman church at Knowlton
- Designated: 14 October 1924

Listed Building
- Official name: Ruins of Knowlton Church
- Type: Grade II*
- Designated: 18 March 1955
- Reference no.: 1120071

Knowlton Circles (also known as Knowlton Henges or Knowlton Rings) are a complex of henges and earthworks in Knowlton, Dorset, England. The henge enclosing Knowlton Church is the best known and best preserved, but there are at least two other henges in the vicinity as well as numerous round barrows.

== Overview ==
The Knowlton Circles are a cluster of Neolithic and Bronze Age monuments near Knowlton. There are four enclosures, three are of normal henge form, Church Henge, Knowlton North and Knowlton South, and the fourth is a squarish enclosure known as Old Churchyard. Church Henge is the best preserved of these monuments and encloses the ruins of Knowlton Church. Nearby is the large round barrow known as Great Barrow and a number of other round barrows are also focused on the area.

== Church Henge ==
Church Henge (also known as the Central Circle, grid reference SU02391028) is the best preserved of the three henges at Knowlton. It is an oval enclosure surrounded by a ditch and earthwork bank. The enclosure is orientated roughly northeast to southwest and measures 106 metres by 94 metres. The enclosing ditch is 10 metres wide and up to 1 metre deep. The outer banks are 10 metres in width and stand up to 1.75 metres high. They consist of a series of straight lengths linked by rounded corners. Three gaps are present in the bank, to the southwest, east and northeast. It unclear which of the gaps are original, although the east entrance is likely to be original, whereas the west entrance was altered at a later date, possibly after the construction of the church.

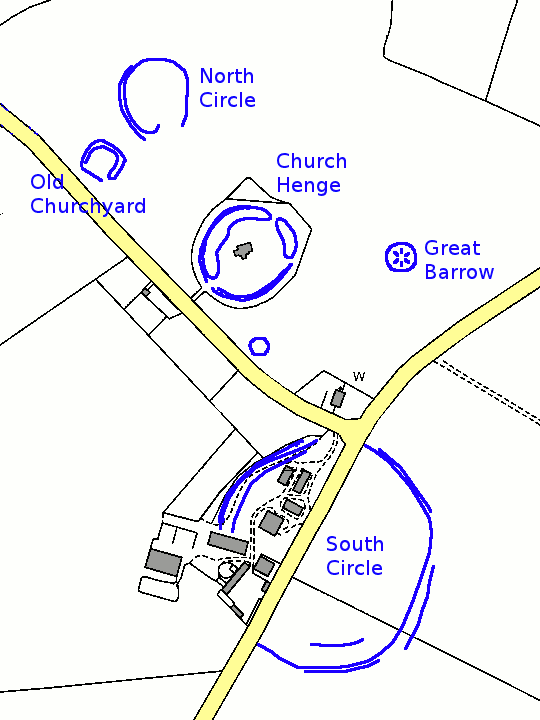
Map of the Knowlton Circles henge complex

Knowlton church stands in the middle of the henge, and symbolises the transition from pagan to Christian worship. Early Christian activity at Knowlton is indicated by a mid-to-late Anglo-Saxon inhumation cemetery which was discovered to the east of Church Henge in 1958. Excavations located sixteen burials within chalk-cut graves, some aligned east-west. The earliest parts of the church are the 12th century chancel and nave and there are 15th and 18th century additions and alterations. In the 18th century the roof fell in and the church was abandoned.

== North Circle ==
Knowlton North (grid reference SU02301045) is a small henge to the northwest of Church Henge, and is the northernmost henge in the Knowlton group. It has largely been destroyed by ploughing. The site is clearly visible as cropmarks, although its original form is uncertain. It appears to be an elongated oval enclosure comprising a ditch with external bank, orientated roughly northwest to south east with a maximum diameter of 94 metres. There is a large entrance on the southeast side.

== South Circle ==
Knowlton South (grid reference SU02460996) is the southernmost of the henges and is also the largest. It still partially survives as an earthwork though it has suffered from ploughing and parts are better visible as cropmarks. The henge is now bisected by the Cranborne to Wimborne road, and farm buildings occupy part of the western side. The maximum diameter of the henge is around 250 metres. The enclosure is defined by a ditch and outer bank separated by a berm. It appears to have been constructed as a series of straight lengths linked by shorter curving lengths. It is best preserved on the north-west side where the bank is 13 metres wide and about 1.2 metres high, separated by a berm 3.5 metres across from the ditch. The ditch is 15 metres wide and 1.5 metres deep. It is not known where the original entrance was, and it may lie to the west under the road or the farm buildings.

== Old Churchyard ==
Old Churchyard (grid reference SU02241037) is an enclosure of uncertain origin and function situated southwest of the North Circle. It has been almost completely levelled by ploughing but is still visible as a cropmark. It is a rounded square in plan, about 60 metres in diameter, and is bounded by a low bank and an external ditch.

== Great Barrow ==
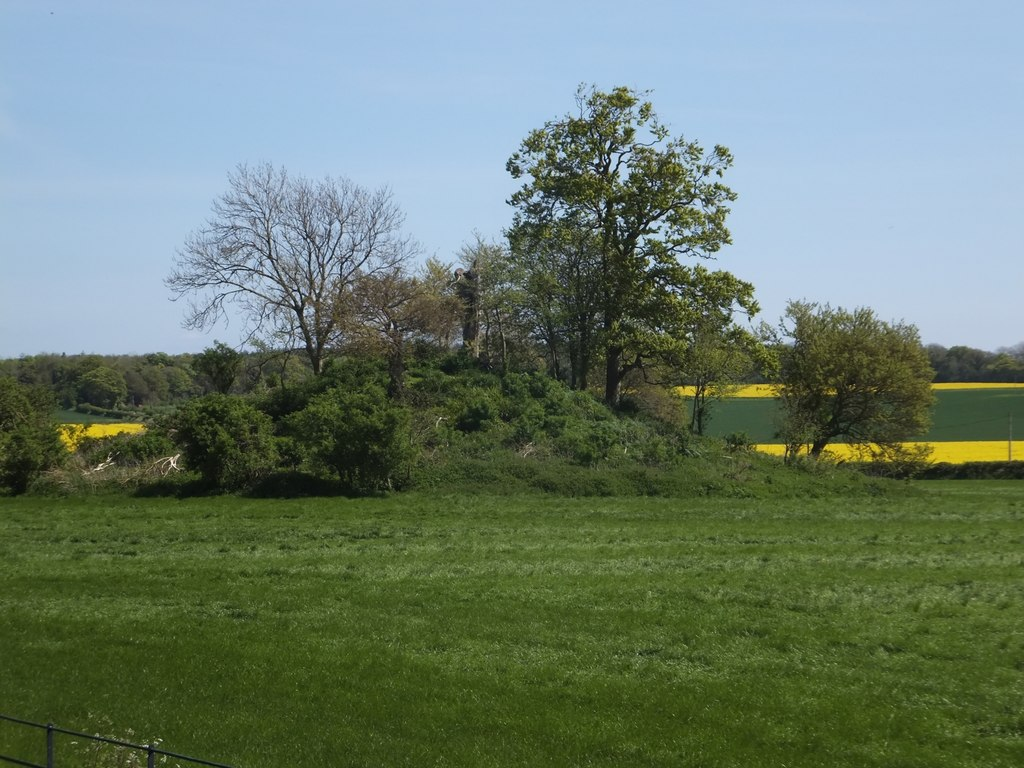
Great Barrow viewed from Church Henge

Great Barrow (grid reference SU02541028) is a large round barrow of probable Late Neolithic or Early Bronze Age date. It is east of Church Henge, and crowned with a clump of trees. It is the largest barrow in Dorset. The barrow is a mound 40 metres in diameter and 6 metres high, surrounded by two concentric ditches, both largely levelled by ploughing. The inner ditch is separated from the mound by a 5 metre berm. The outer ditch is 10 metres wide, 1.5 metres deep and is 120 metres in diameter.

== Knowlton Circles Barrow Group ==
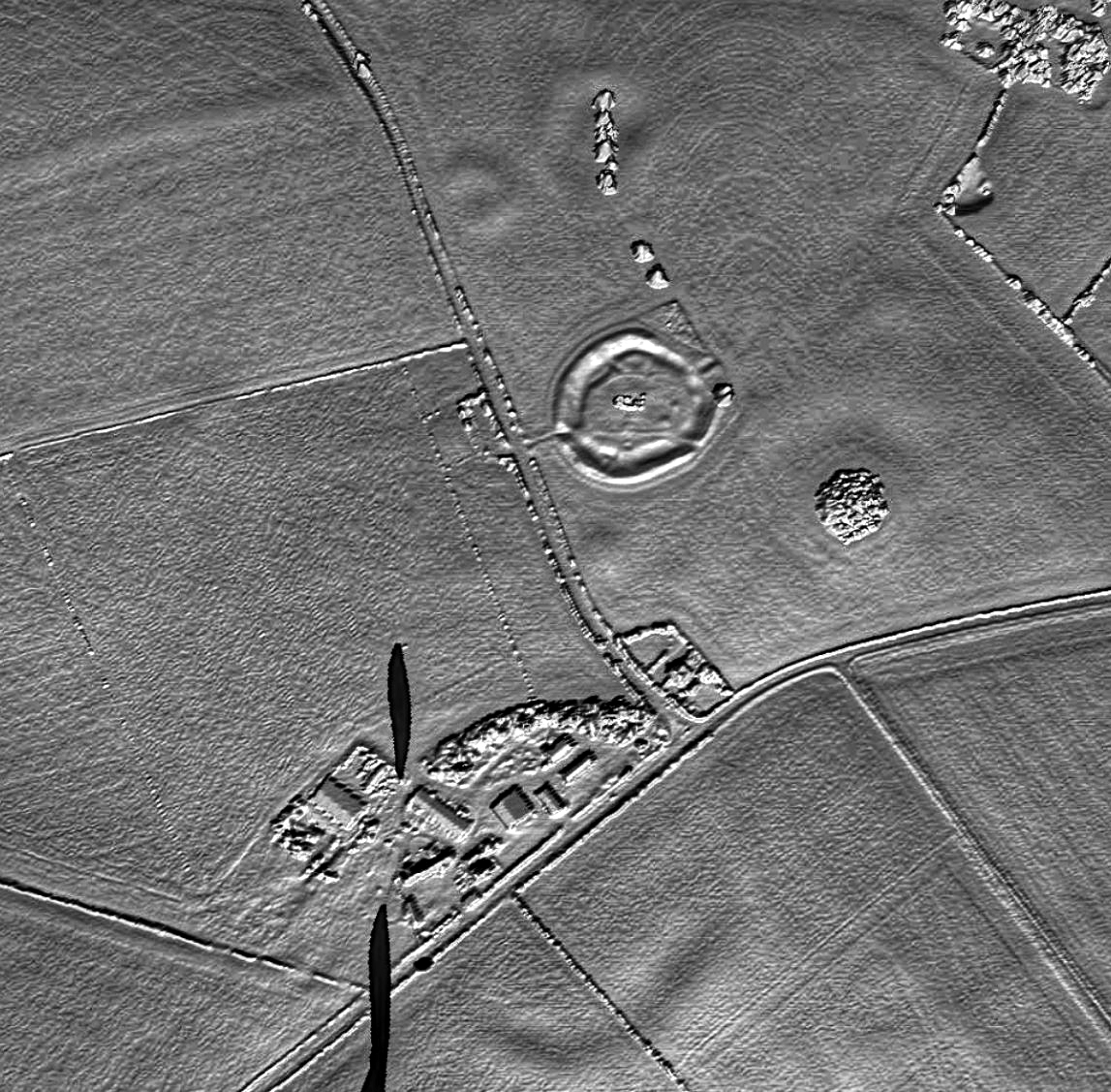
A lidar view of Knowlton.

There are at least 35 barrows known in the Knowlton Circles Barrow Group including The Great Barrow. It is one of the greatest concentrations of round barrows in Dorset. Most are only known as cropmarks, although some are visible to the southwest of the South Circle. The barrows can be placed into three groups: located south and south west of the South Circle, north of the South Circle and around the Church Henge, and north east of the henges. This cluster of barrows indicates that the Knowlton Circles were an important religious centre.

== See also ==
- Dorset Cursus to the northwest of Knowlton Circles
