= Woolbridge Manor House =

Grade II* listed building in Dorset, England

Coordinates: 50.6842°N 2.222°W

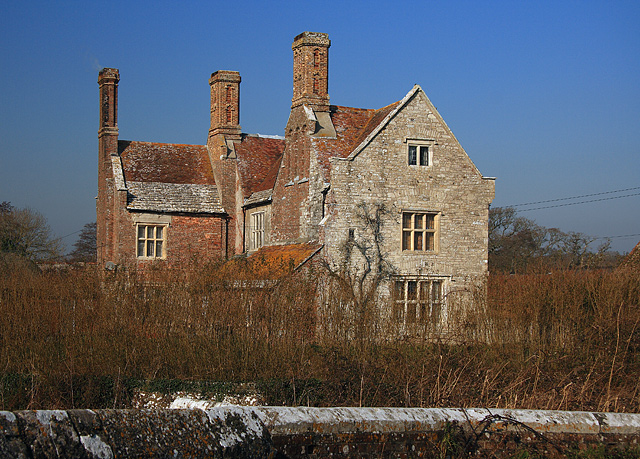
Woolbridge Manor House

Woolbridge Manor is a 17th-century manor house just outside the village of Wool, in Dorset, England. English Heritage have designated it a Grade II* listed building. It is on the north side of the old Wool bridge, a historic crossing point over the River Frome, now closed to traffic except pedestrians and cyclists due to a bypass and junction.

== Structure ==
Woolbridge Manor House has three storeys of red brick and stone construction. The roof covering is made of clay tiles with seven courses of stone slates to the eaves. Many windows around the building have been removed at some time, possibly due to the window tax in 1696.

Woolbridge Manor is said to have been garrisoned in the English Civil War and still has some of the metal bars set into the remaining ground floor stone mullion windows, as well as a wooden security bar across the front door. Woolbridge Manor was at some time partially demolished and was once much bigger, possibly forming a hollow square with an enclosed courtyard in the center. It is rumoured that a tunnel runs under the river from the Manor to Bindon Abbey.

== Wellbridge House ==
The Manor was formerly in possession of the Turberville family of Dorset (descendants of George Turberville) until sold in the eighteenth century and it is the inspiration for Wellbridge House—Tess's ancestral home where she and Angel Clare spent their unfortunate honeymoon—in Thomas Hardy's novel Tess of the D'Urbervilles:

They drove by the level road along the valley to a distance of a few miles, and, reaching Wellbridge, turned away from the village to the left, and over the great Elizabethan bridge which gives the place half its name. Immediately behind it stood the house wherein they had engaged lodgings, whose exterior features are so well known to all travellers through the Froom Valley; once portion of a fine manorial residence, and the property and seat of a D'Urberville, but since its partial demolition a farm-house.

In the house today, on the first floor landing, remain two seventeenth-century mural portraits, mentioned in the novel as "ladies of the D'Urberville family", Tess's ancestors.

== Phantom Coach of the Turbervilles ==
A local legend, also mentioned in Tess of the D'Urbervilles, states that a phantom coach crosses the bridge by Woolbridge Manor at night, but only those with Turberville blood can see it. Various versions of the legend exist, but one associates the coach with the elopement of John Turberville of Woolbridge with Anne, the daughter of Thomas Howard, 1st Viscount Howard of Bindon.
