= All Saints Church, Hampreston =

Church in Dorset, England

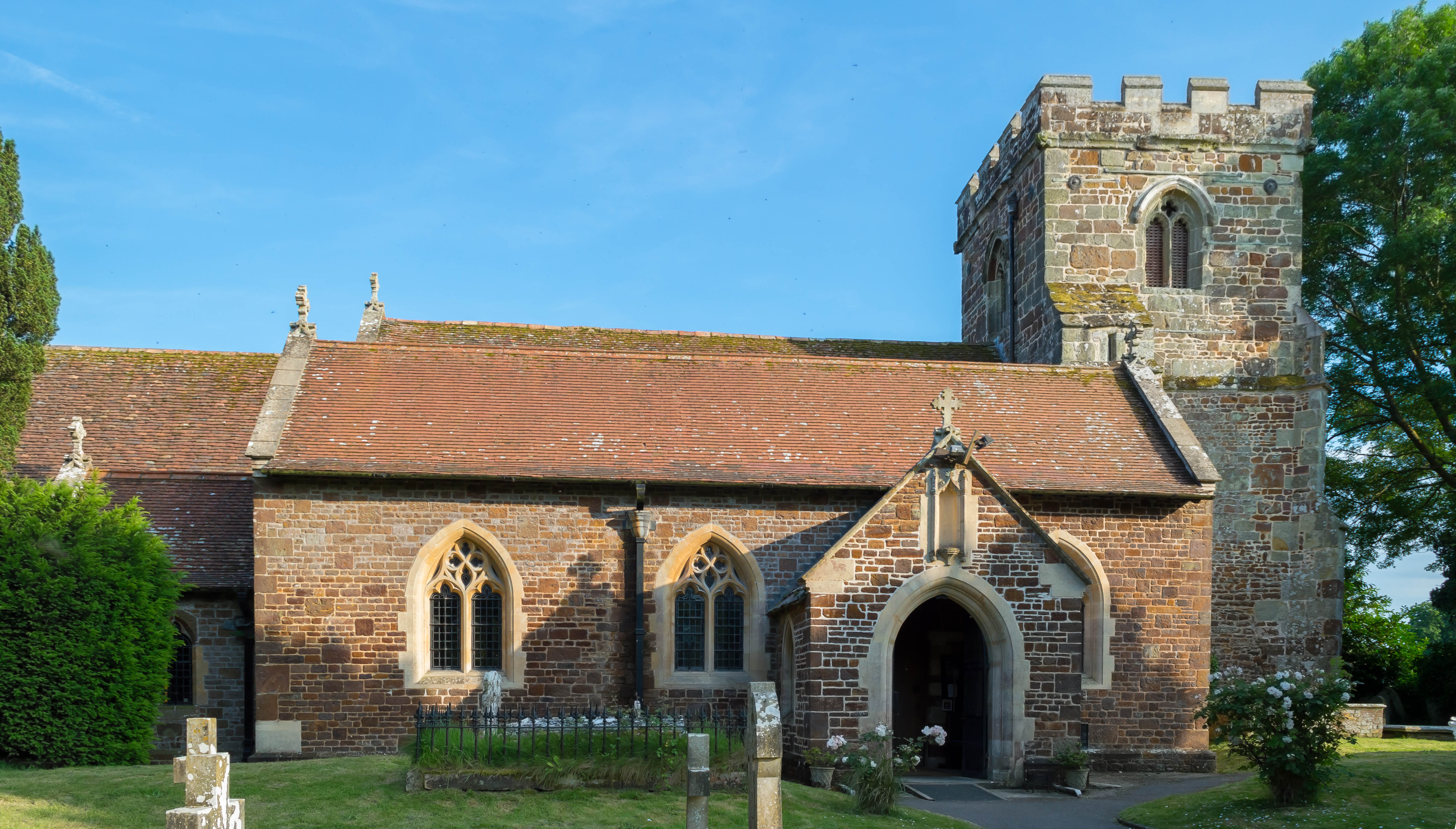
- All Saints from the north

- Location within Dorset
- 50.7888°N 1.9231°W
- Country: England
- Denomination: Church of England
- Churchmanship: Charismatic Evangelical

History
- Dedication: All Saints

Administration
- Province: Canterbury
- Diocese: Salisbury

Clergy
- Vicar: Rev Sarah Pix

All Saints Church is the Church of England parish church of Hampreston, Dorset, England. It is a Grade II* listed building.

== History ==
Evidence of a Norman building can be seen in the reset 12th-century head of the north doorway. The chancel and tower are from the 14th century; restoration in 1896 saw the addition of the north aisle and the reconstruction of the north porch and the chancel arch.

The east window is from the early 15th century, and there are two 14th-century windows in the north wall of the chancel. The font is 12th or 13th century and, there are 16th-century oak benches in the choir. The church was designated as Grade II* listed in 1955.

== Bells ==
In 1738, three bells were recorded (the present 2, 3 and 5). In 1800, Thomas Mears added the present 4th and then in 1923, the tenor was cast followed by the treble in 1928 to complete the ring. The tenor weighs half a ton (508 kg). In 2003, Whites of Appleton overhauled the ring and Whitechapel Bell Foundry retuned several of the bells. In 2013, the 5th bell cracked and had to be welded.
