= Museum of East Dorset =

Museum in Wimborne Minster, Dorset, UK

Coordinates: 50.7995°N 1.9876°W

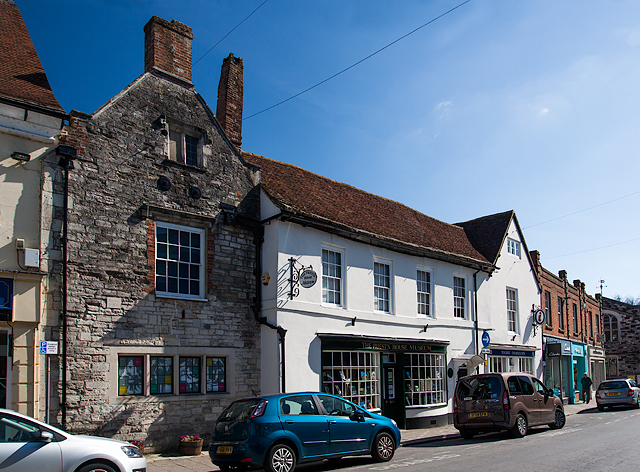
Museum of East Dorset

The Museum of East Dorset (formerly known as the Priest's House Museum) is a local museum in the town of Wimborne Minster in Dorset, England. It is located on the high street, opposite the Church of Wimborne Minster. The museum occupies a historic Grade II* listed building, a hall house dating from the late 16th or early 17th century.

The museum is dedicated to rural life in a market town in Dorset and the exhibits are based on the daily lives of people within the house and within Wimborne and Dorset. There are also exhibits on the religious use of the building and its home to past ministers of the Minster Church. The building has been restored and many of the original features remain intact for public appreciation. Notable rooms are the 17th-century main hall and the 18th-century parlour and Victorian kitchen with its working 'Beetonette' range. Displays include reconstructions of local businesses that once ran from the building. Mr Low's Victorian stationery shop (closed up for over 30 years) and the Coles' Ironmongers were both recreated from original shop stock.

In addition to the main museum house, the East Dorset Villages Gallery gives a taste of local community life from industry to shopping, school to church life, with a hands-on Victorian schoolroom. A walled garden, with seating, behind the Priest's House covers one third of an acre and is open to visitors to the house. A tea room, formerly the 1920s Boathouse, also in the garden and on the banks of the River Allen, is open to visitors.

The Museum is run by an independent charitable trust. It is supported by East Dorset District Council but relies on admission income to operate.

== 2009 fire ==
The museum was almost hit by disaster on 3 July 2009 when a fire started in the adjacent buildings. Martin's newsagents, Saville Travel, a Thomas Cook shop and The Albion Inn were all damaged but the museum narrowly avoided disaster.
