= St Hubert's Church, Corfe Mullen =

Church in Dorset, England

St Hubert's Church
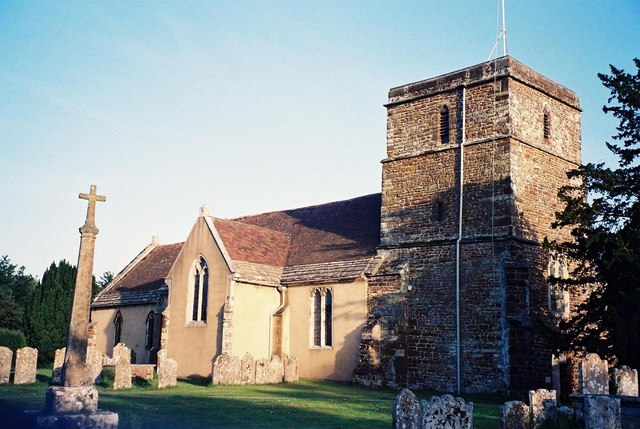
- St Hubert's Church
- St Hubert's Church
- 50°47′05″N 2°02′05″W
- Denomination: Church of England
- Churchmanship: A mix of traditional and contemporary worship
- Website: St Nicholas and St Hubert's churches in the Parish of Corfe Mullen

History
- Dedication: Saint Hubert

Architecture
- Heritage designation: Grade II*; ID: 1303916
- Years built: 13th century

Administration
- Province: Canterbury
- Diocese: Salisbury
- Archdeaconry: Dorset
- Deanery: Wimborne
- Parish: Corfe Mullen

Clergy
- Rector: Revd. Jane Burgess

St Hubert's Church is a 13th-century Church of England parish church in Corfe Mullen, a district of Wimborne, in the ceremonial county of Dorset, on the south coast of England.

It is a Grade II* listed building and one of two churches in the Anglican parish of Corfe Mullen that form "one church family" offering a mix of "traditional and contemporary worship". The church is a popular venue for weddings.

== Location ==
The church is located in farmland in the valley of the River Stour on the corner of Knoll Lane and the Blandford Road (B3074), just before its junction with the A31. To the south runs the track bed of the old Somerset and Dorset Railway, now part of the North Dorset Trailway. It is part of the original village of Corfe Mullen and is separated from the main conurbation which is on the ridge of Corfe Hills in the southeast of the parish and served by St. Nicholas Church.

== History ==
The church dates to the 13th century and was built on "the first reliably dry ground south of the River Stour" using locally quarried heathstone. But Christians may have worshipped here even earlier at the site marked by the cross in the churchyard.

The original church was known as St. Nicholas, the name transferring to its sister church when that was built in Corfe Hills in the late 20th century. It probably began life as a single storey rectangular building with a nave and chancel but, in early 14th century it was enhanced by the addition of the present church tower. For centuries thereafter it changed little and the next major expansion was not carried out until 1841, when the south transept was added, the organ gallery created and the north porch converted into the vestry.

Until 1857, the church acted as a chapel of ease to Sturminster Marshall. In the last century, work has focused on restoration and redecoration and conservation of this listed building continues to be supported by the "Friends of St. Hubert's".

Above the chancel and nave, the roof incorporates a number of highly decorative roof bosses including one with a red rose and one with the initials "ER" suggesting that the roof was built during the reign of Edward IV. There is also a 17th-century communion table with the royal arms of George III.

== Churchyard ==
The churchyard is notable for its ancient yew tree, said to be 1,000 years old, and the stepped base of a 14th-century cross said believed to be located on the site of early Christian worship. A new shaft and cross was added in 1925; not long afterwards the original cross was found, buried, and has now been built into the west wall of the tower.

== St Nicholas' Church ==
During the 20th century, Corfe Mullen expanded with hundreds of homes being built on the heathland of Corfe Hills to the south of the original village on the plains. As a result, in 1995, a new Anglican church, St. Nicholas', was built on the high street of the conurbation and Corfe Mullen has since been a parish of two church buildings.

== Today ==
There is a range of worship styles, both traditional and contemporary. Under normal circumstances, a traditional morning or communion service is held fortnightly at St. Hubert's at 8:45 am on Sundays. A more contemporary style service is then held at 10 am in St. Nicholas' Church. The combined congregation numbers around 150 adults. St. Hubert's is a popular baptism and wedding venue.

During the pandemic lockdown, St. Hubert's was closed and Sunday services were instead live streamed at 10 am from St Nicholas. In addition, there is a range of online activities, both social and spiritual.

== Gallery ==
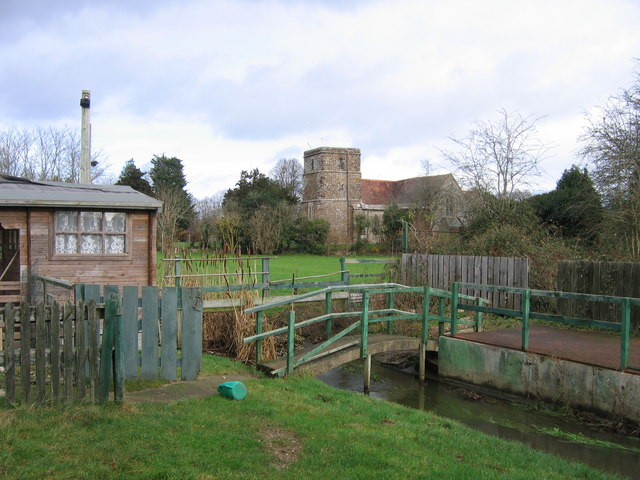
St. Hubert's Church from the North Dorset Trailway

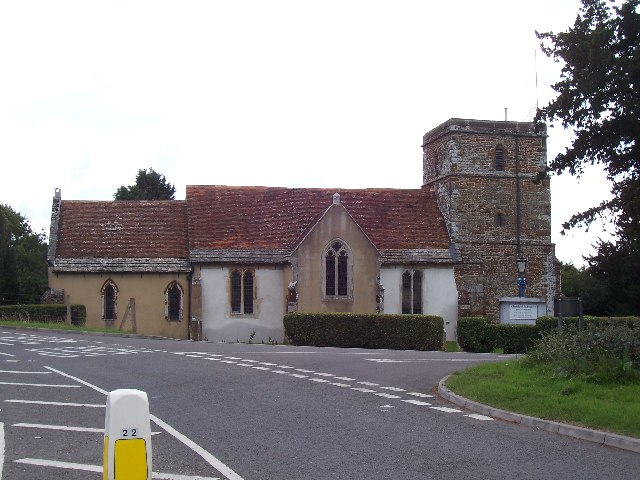
St. Hubert's Church and the A31/B3074 junction

== See also ==
- Corfe Mullen
