= Hampreston =

Village in Dorset, England

Coordinates: 50.789°N 1.925°W

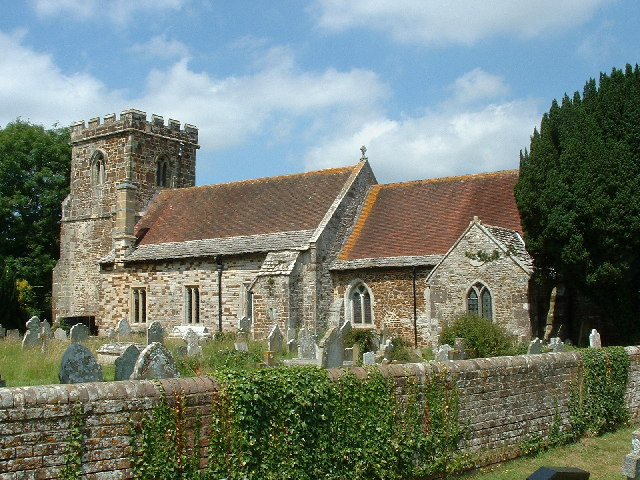
- Hampreston Church

- Location within Dorset
- OS grid reference: SZ054987
- Civil parish: Ferndown Town
- Unitary authority: Dorset
- Ceremonial county: Dorset
- Region: South West
- Country: England
- Sovereign state: United Kingdom
- Post town: FERNDOWN
- Postcode district: BH22
- Dialling code: 01202
- Police: Dorset
- Fire: Dorset and Wiltshire
- Ambulance: South Western
- UK Parliament: Christchurch

Hampreston is a small village in the civil parish of Ferndown Town in Dorset, southern England. Until 1986 the whole parish took the name of Hampreston, with its population rising from 1,860 in 1921 to 11,750 in 1971.

All Saints, the Church of England parish church, was begun in the 14th century and is a Grade II* listed building. The village has a school and a farm shop.

The folk singer Bob Roberts (1907–1982) was born in Hampreston.
