= Mortons House Hotel =

Grade II* listed building in Dorset, England

Coordinates: 50°38′16″N 2°03′20″W

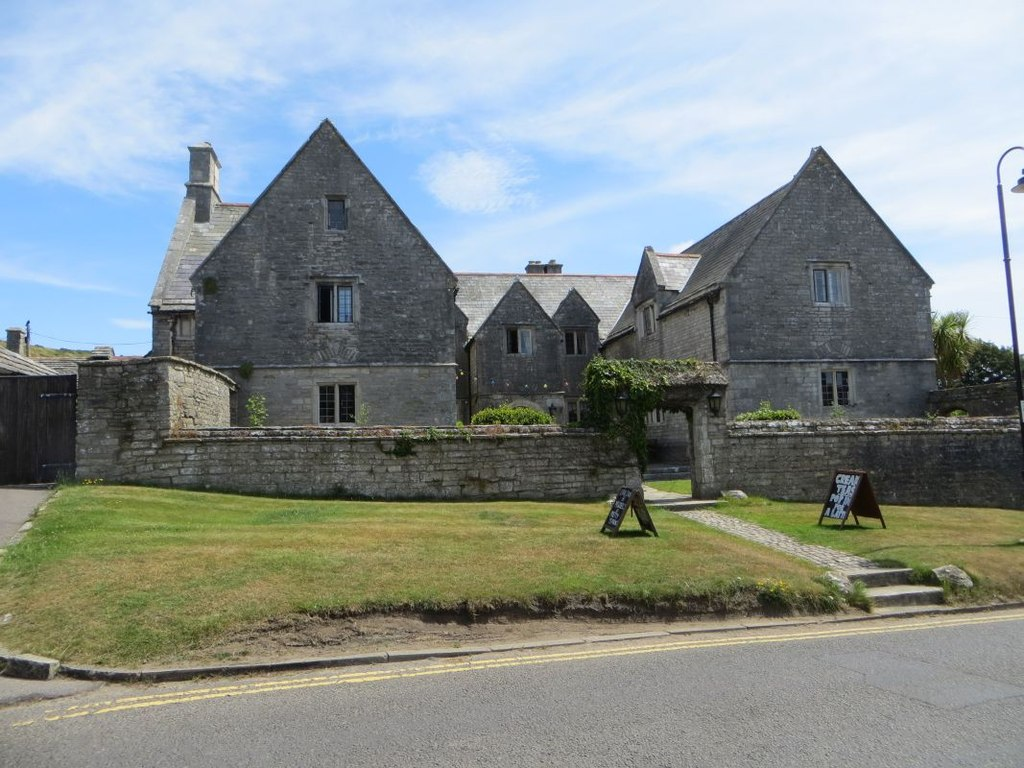
Mortons House Hotel

Mortons House Hotel in Corfe Castle in Dorset, is a building of historical significance and is Grade II* listed on the National Heritage List for England. It was built in 1590 and was the home of several notable families over the next four centuries; it is now a hotel.

== Early period (1590 to 1890) ==
The Dacombe (sometimes spelt Dackombe or Dackham) family built Mortons House in 1590. They had acquired this estate by marriage in about 1500 when Thomas Dacombe had married Elizabeth Clavell who was the daughter and heir of Richard Clavell of Corfe Castle. Thomas's grandson William Dacombe, a wealthy landowner and gentleman, built the house. Shortly after this it was inherited by his son Edward Dacombe, who was a Member of Parliament and Mayor of Corfe Castle. He passed it to his son Bruen Dacombe, who in turn left it to his son Edward Dacombe. When Edward died in 1683 the house was left to his son Henry Dacombe who sold it to John Morton of Henbury.

John had bought the Corfe Castle property in about 1712 and it became known as Mortons House. John died in 1750; as he had no direct heirs John left his property to his nephew Reverend John Colson. Documents held by the Dorset History Centre Archives record that the Reverend John Colson sold this house (referred to as “the mansion house”) to John Bond (1717–1784) who was a Member of Parliament in 1751.

The Bond family retained possession of Morton’s House for the next two centuries. They sometimes lived in it but mostly they rented it to wealthy tenants. One of the first was the Dampier family. They were tenants for many years until the last daughter Mary died in 1820.

== Later period (1890 to present) ==
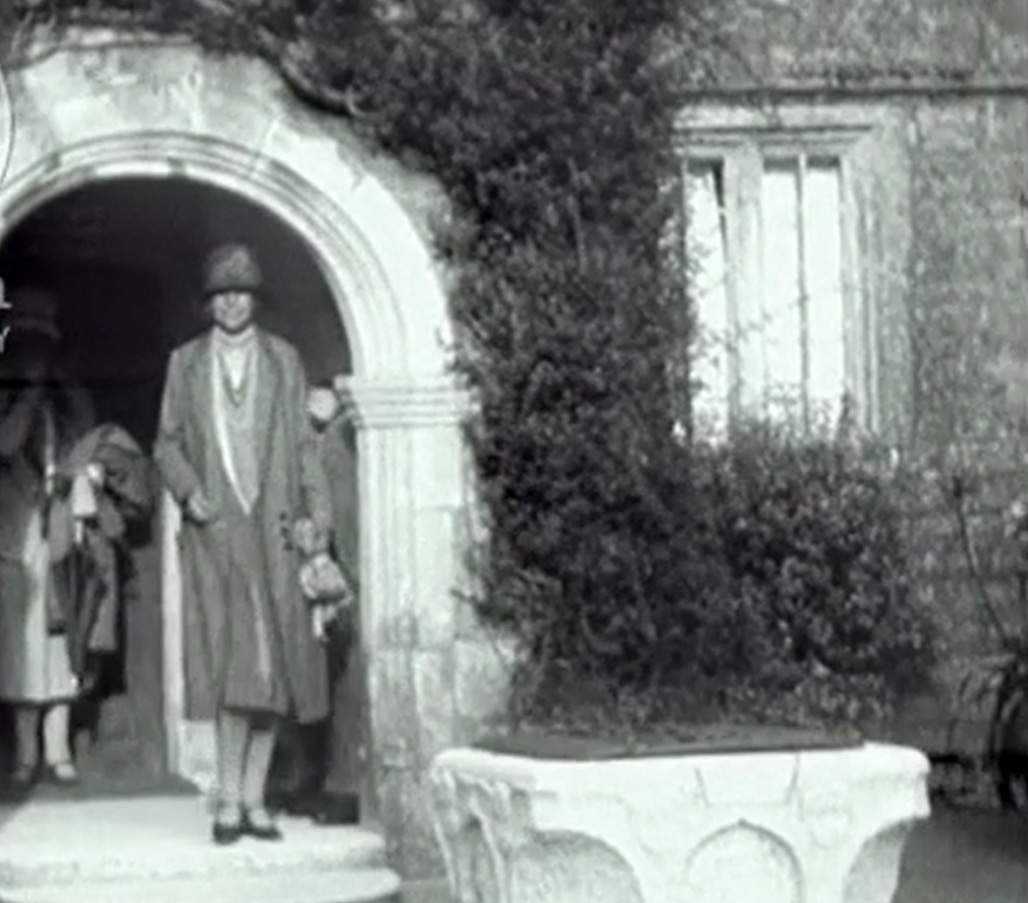
Ruth Cavendish-Bentinck at Mortons House in the 1920s

In the 1890s William Augustus Rixon, an artist, and his wife Lady Julia Bolton were tenants of the house. While he lived there William made several paintings around Corfe Castle. One of them showing the village street in 1891 can be seen at this reference. The most notable tenants were the Cavendish-Bentincks who were residents from 1898 until 1933. (William George) Frederick Cavendish Bentinck was the son of George Cavendish-Bentinck. He was educated at the University of Cambridge and became a lawyer. In 1887 he married Ruth St. Maur and the couple had five children two of whom became the 8th and 9th Dukes of Portland.

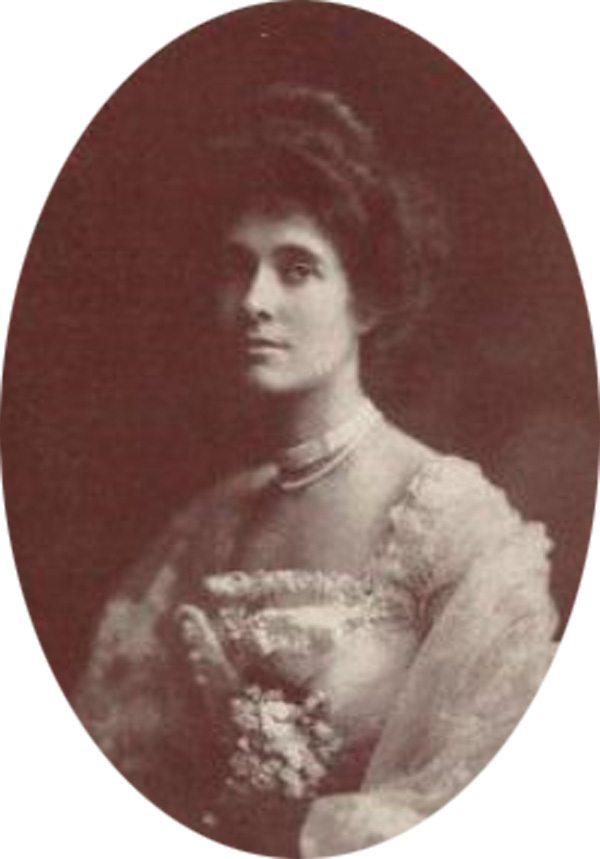
Ruth Cavendish-Bentinck circa 1900

Ruth Cavendish Bentinck, his wife, became a famous suffragette and political activist. In 1911 she wrote a letter from Morton's House which is still noteworthy in which she railed against changes to fair wage legislation. She thought these changes would damage the next generation as working men were struggling to feed their families, she said, and widows were expected to be grateful for a pittance to raise their fatherless children: "The West Country labourer is supposed to live on the beauty of his scenery and his picturesque (and too often insanitary) house".

She had a wide variety of close friends from George Bernard Shaw and Keir Hardie, to the Duke of Argyll and Edward VII's mistress, Alice Keppel. She was also friends with the famous painter Philip de László and his wife Lucy Guinness and in the 1920s this couple visited them at Mortons House. De Loszlo owned one of the first motion cameras and a short home movie of their visit to the house can be seen at this reference.

The Cavendish Bentincks lived at Mortons House until 1933 and then lived in London. Freddie died in 1948 at the age of 92 and Ruth died in 1956 at the age of 86. In 1983 Sir John Rupert Colville wrote a book on Ruth's interesting life called Strange Inheritance.

In about 1940 the Bond family returned to live at Mortons House. Lieutenant Colonel Ashley Raymond Bond moved in with his wife Annette Hester Mary Bowles. They had two sons while they were living there.

== Gallery ==
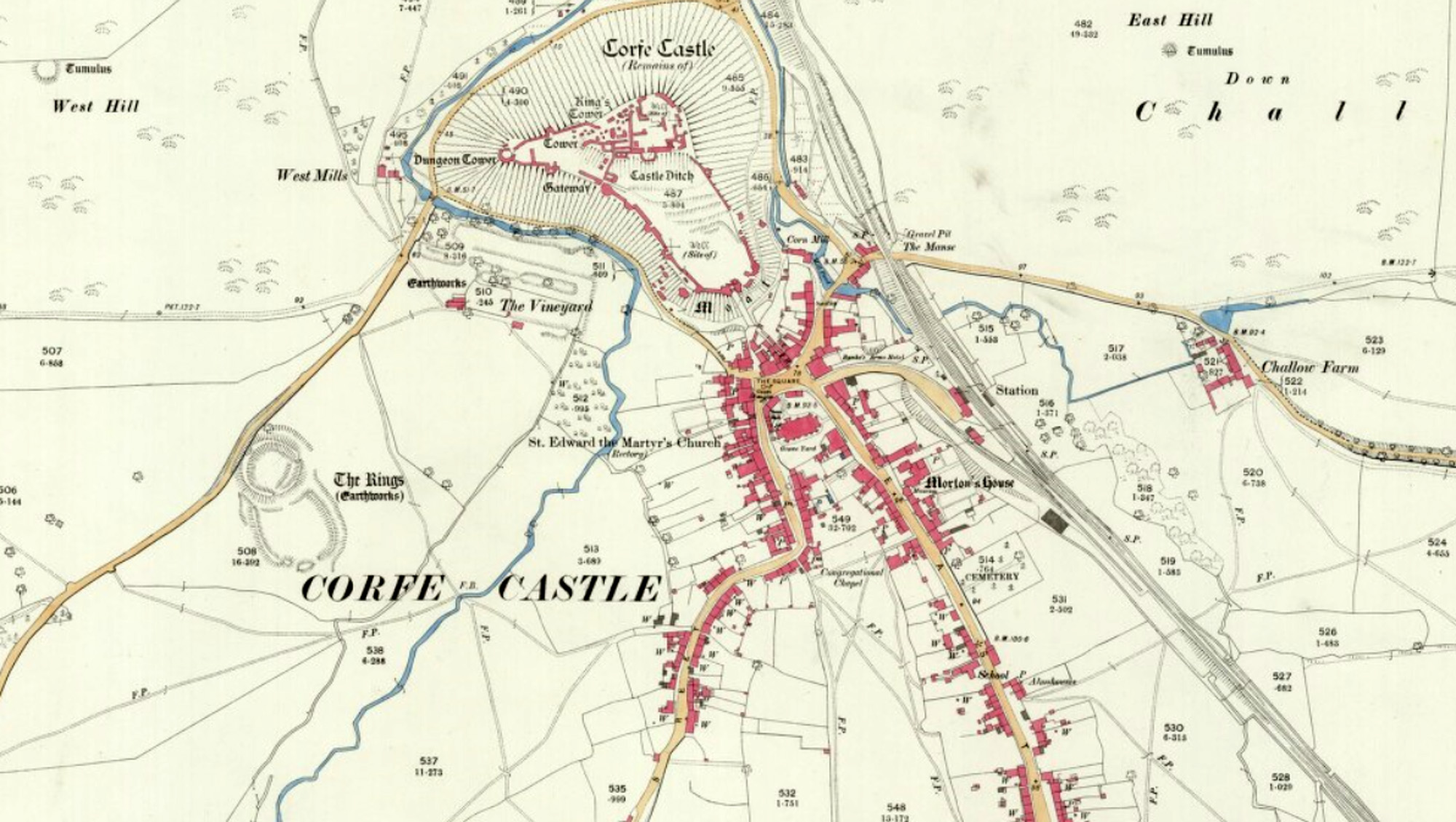
Map of Corfe Castle in 1886

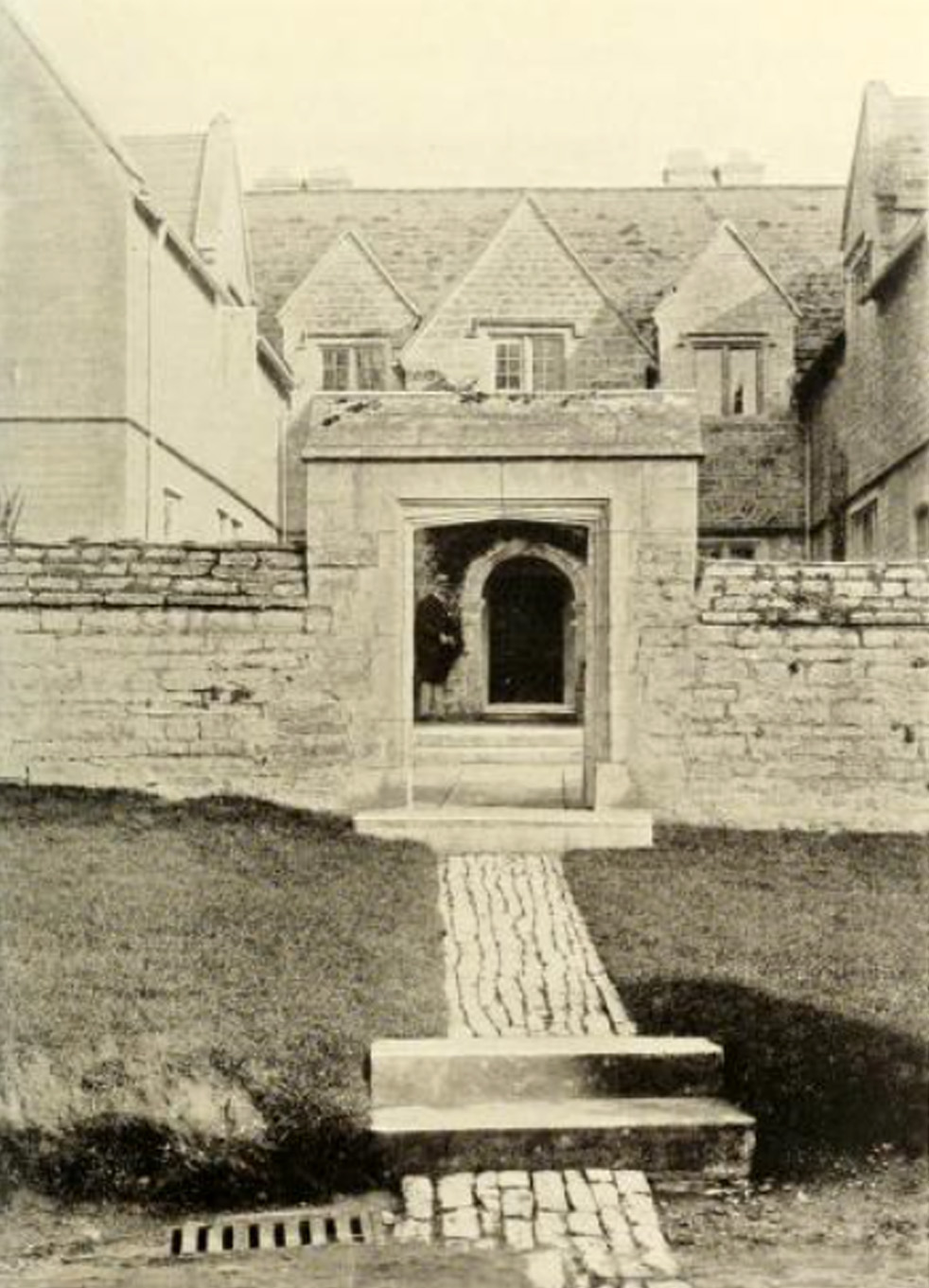
Mortons House in 1902

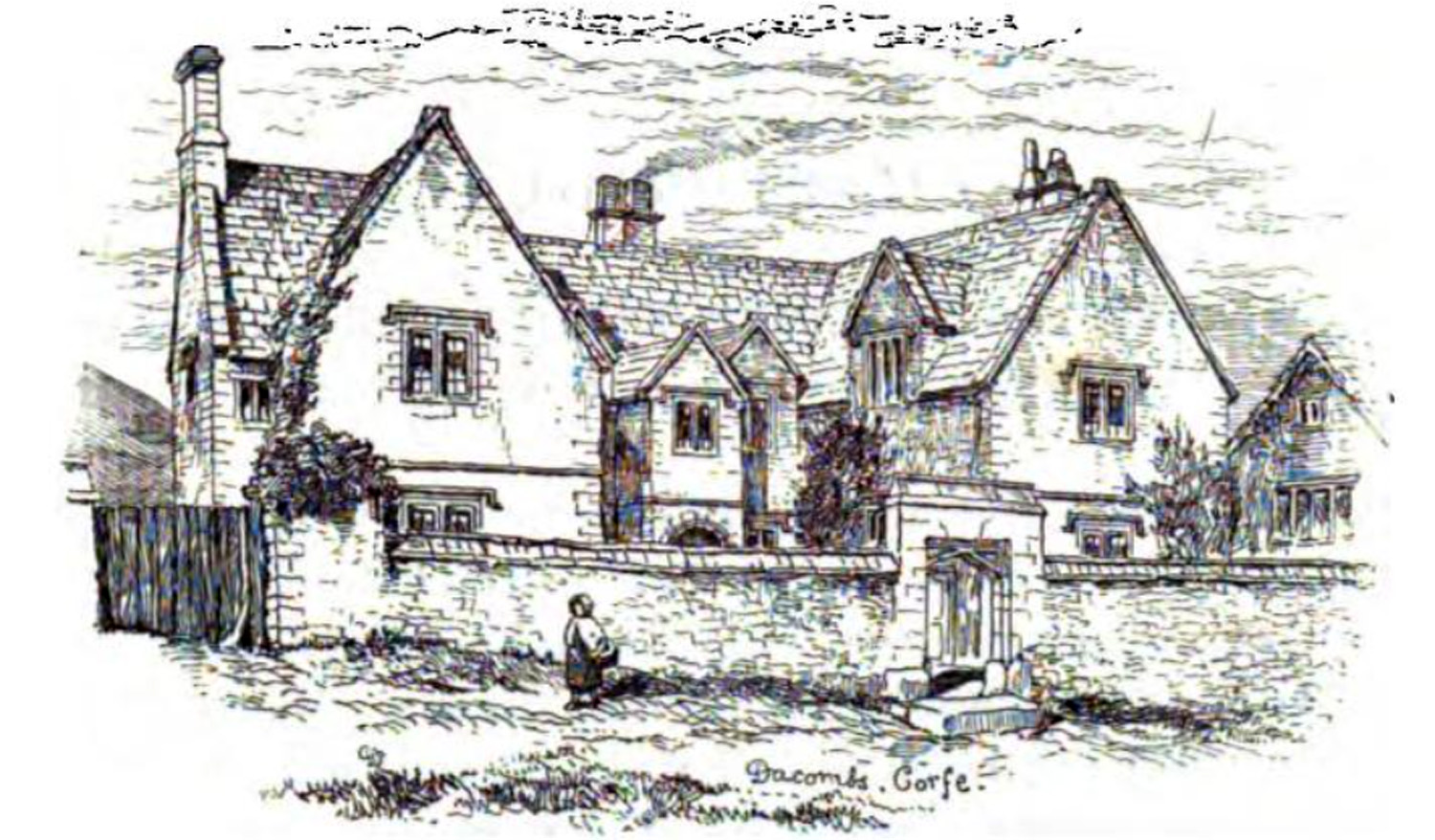
Sketch of Mortons House in 1882
