= Brewhouse =

Building made for brewing beer

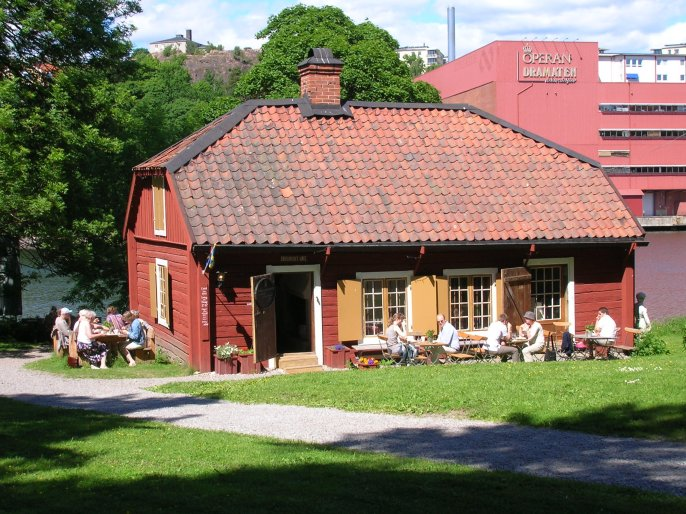
The Brewhouse Svindersvik in Nacka, Sweden.

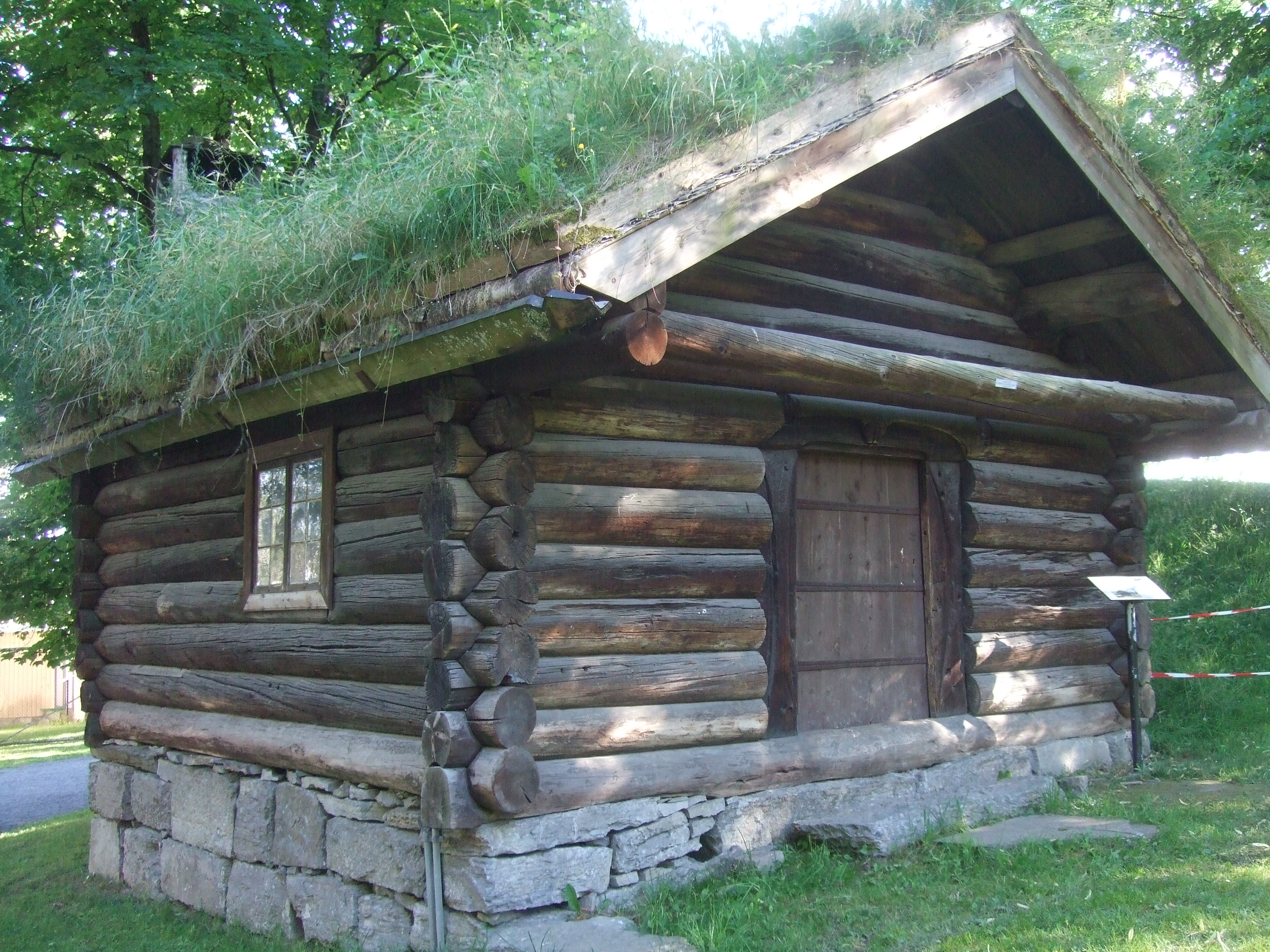
Brewhouse from Tinn Municipality, Norway.

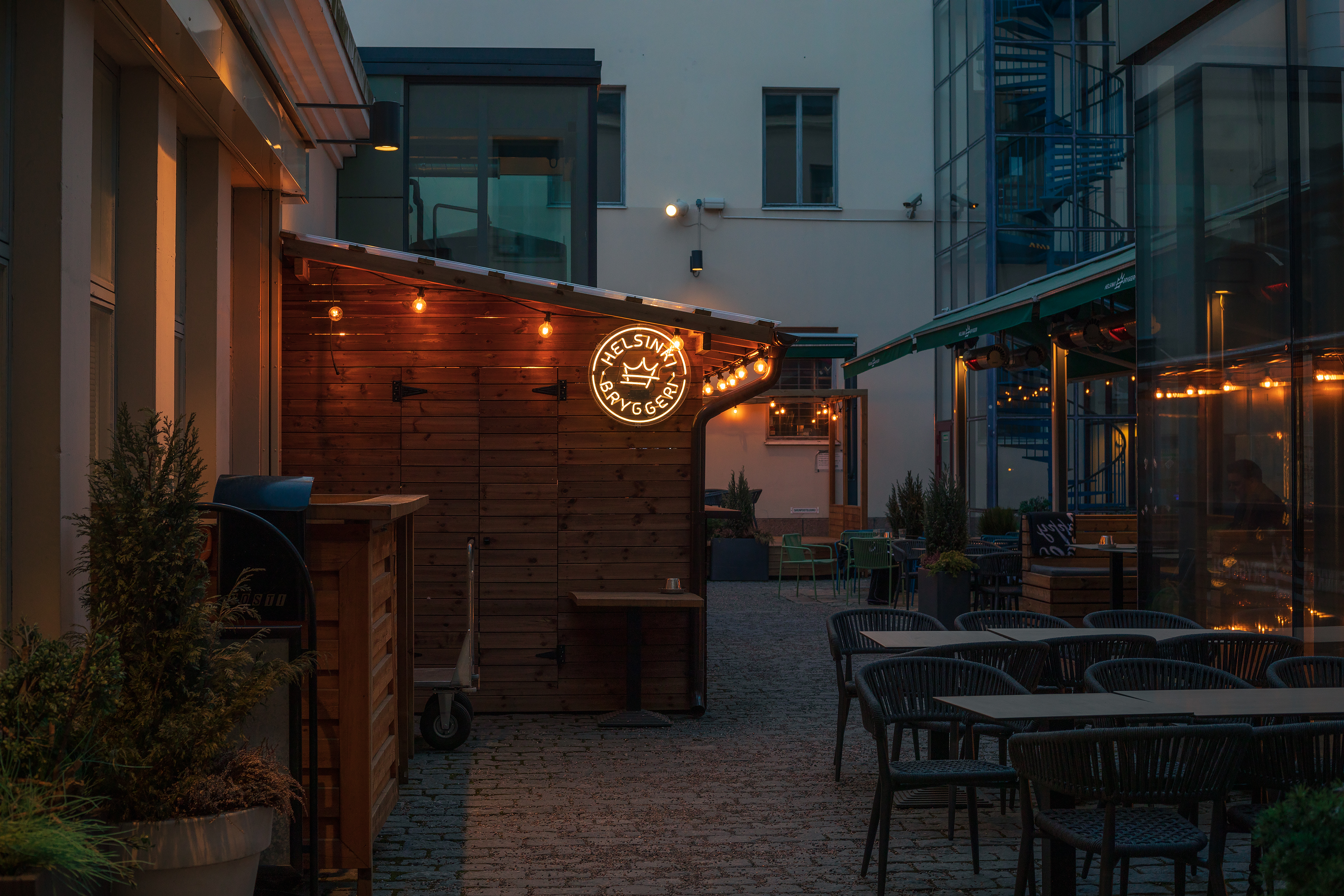
The Helsinki Bryggeri Brewhouse in Helsinki, Finland.

A brewhouse is a building made for brewing beer and ale. This could be a part of a specialized brewery operation, but historically a brewhouse is a private building only meant for domestic production.

Larger households, such as noble estates, often had dedicated brewhouses that could be quite elaborate using equipment not too different from that of commercial breweries. English country houses have detailed records of brewhouses.

In ordinary farming households brewing was in some regions done outside, particularly in summer. The Baltic countries have a concept of a "summer kitchen", which is basically an outdoor area used for cooking and brewing in summer, but brewing could also be done outside in parts of Norway and Sweden as well as Russia.

An ordinary farm household could rarely afford to dedicate an entire building, or even an entire room, to brewing, and so brewing was usually done in what is best understood as a "rough kitchen", a kitchen suitable for coarser jobs with heavy use of fire, such as sausage-making, butchering, large-scale baking, clothes washing, and brewing. This could either be a dedicated building or just a single room.

== Regional varieties ==
In Sweden it was not unusual to simply brew in the kitchen in the main house. Finnish customs may have been similar.

In Denmark brewing generally took place in a room known as "bryggers", serving as the "rough kitchen". The main part of the farm was generally a U-shaped complex of buildings enclosing the farm yard, with the "bryggers" as a room in this complex. The same arrangement could be seen in southern Sweden.

In Norway most farms had a separate building known as eldhus (literally: "fire-house") which also served as the "rough kitchen". In many cases this was the old main house of the farm, an earlier type of building with no chimney known as "årestue", converted to an eldhus after a new, more modern main house with a chimney was built.

In Scandinavia and Eastern Europe there are several remaining farm brewhouses, though few are now in use.
