= Knowlton, Dorset =

Hamlet in Dorset, England

Coordinates: 50.891972°N 1.967389°W

Knowlton
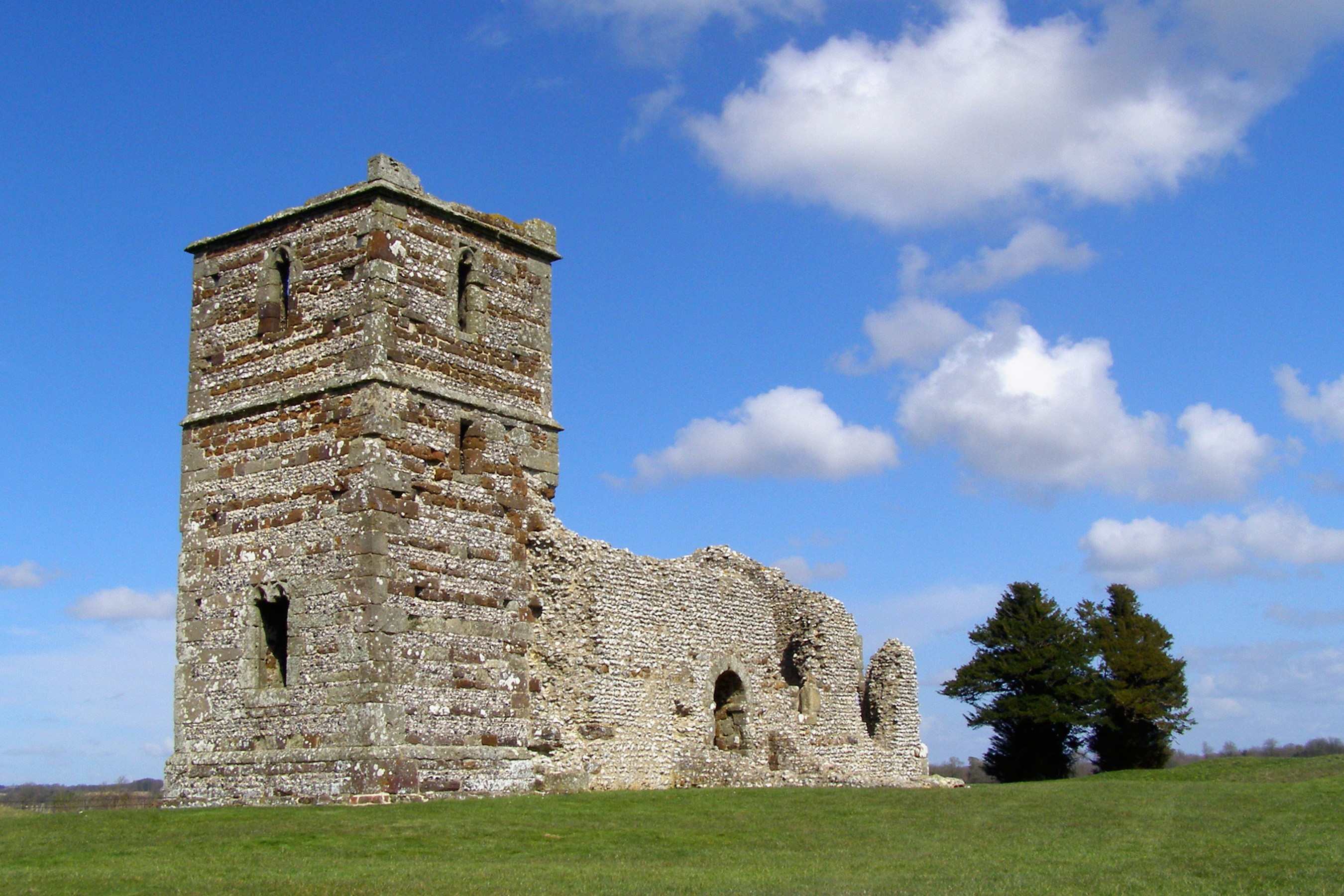
- Knowlton Church

- Location within Dorset
- OS grid reference: SU022103
- Civil parish: Woodlands
- Unitary authority: Dorset
- Ceremonial county: Dorset
- Region: South West
- Country: England
- Sovereign state: United Kingdom
- Post town: WIMBORNE
- Postcode district: BH21 5AE
- Police: Dorset
- Fire: Dorset and Wiltshire
- Ambulance: South Western
- UK Parliament: North Dorset

Knowlton is a hamlet in the civil parish of Woodlands, Dorset, England. It is about 6 miles north of town Wimborne Minster, and about 1 mile south of the village of Wimborne St Giles. Its most recognizable features are a ruined Norman church built within a Neolithic henge monument.

== Knowlton Circles ==
The henge enclosing Knowlton Church is only one of three henges (known as Knowlton Circles) and associated earthworks. However, Church Henge is the best preserved, and is maintained by English Heritage. Nearby is Great Barrow, the largest round barrow in Dorset. Aerial photographs reveal a large number of ploughed-out barrows in the immediate vicinity.

== Knowlton Church ==
Knowlton Church is a ruined building of unknown dedication standing near the centre of Church Henge. The earliest parts of the building are the 12th-century chancel and nave and there are 15th and 18th century additions and alterations. The church was in use in 1550; however, lack of use led to calls to demolish it in 1659. But it saw a revival after this time, and a north aisle was built in 1730. Later in the 18th century the roof fell in and the church was abandoned. The church is a Grade II* listed building. The nearby Victorian-built Church of the Ascension at Woodlands has a 12th-century circular stone font originally from Knowlton Church.

== History of Knowlton ==
Early Christian activity at Knowlton is indicated by a mid-to-late Anglo-Saxon inhumation cemetery which was discovered to the east of Church Henge in 1958. Excavations located sixteen burials within chalk-cut graves, some aligned east-west.

Knowlton is recorded in the Domesday Book of 1086–87 as Chenoltone. Winfrith Newburgh, East or West Lulworth, "Wintreborne" and Knowlton were held by King William; they were previously held by King Edward. The Domesday Book also records two hides of the land of the Count of Mortain in Knowlton, named as Chenoltune in the book, held by Ansgar, which was held by Æthelmær in the time of King Edward. This land paid geld, was enough for one plough with one slave and one bordar, a mill paying 12s6d, and was worth 25s.

The site of the ancient village of Knowlton (as opposed to the present day hamlet) is located 500 metres west of Knowlton Church along Lumber Lane at the banks of the River Allen. There is little to be seen on the ground, but aerial photos do show the village layout.
