= Bournemouth =

Town in Dorset, England

Coordinates: 50°43′12″N 1°52′48″W

- Town
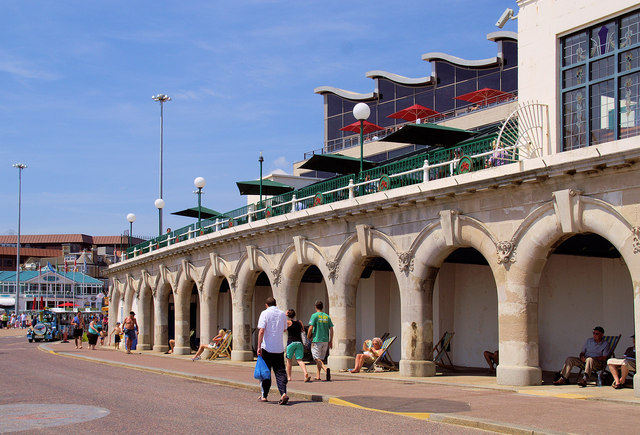
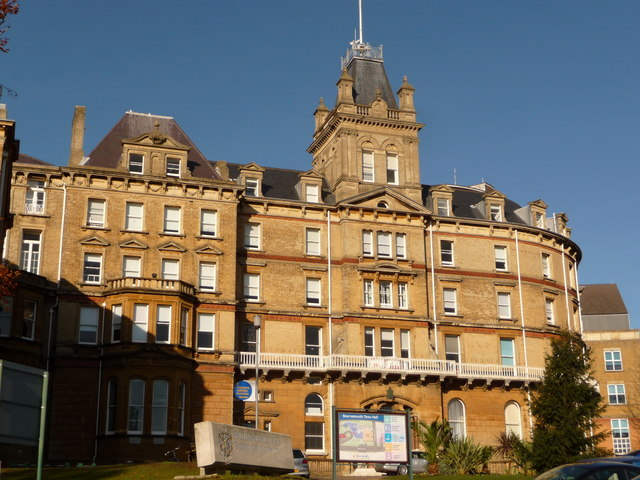
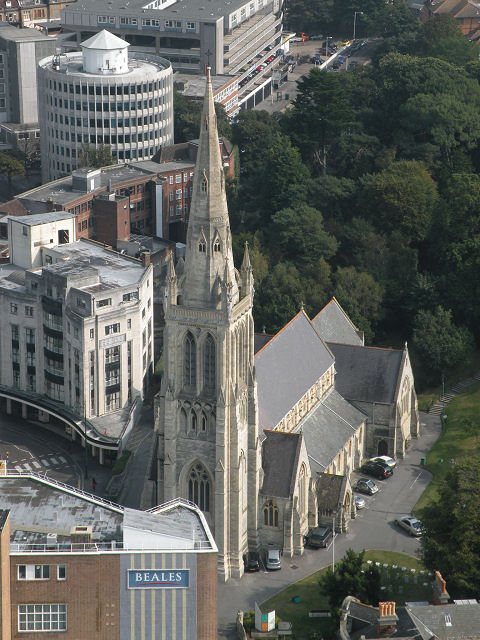
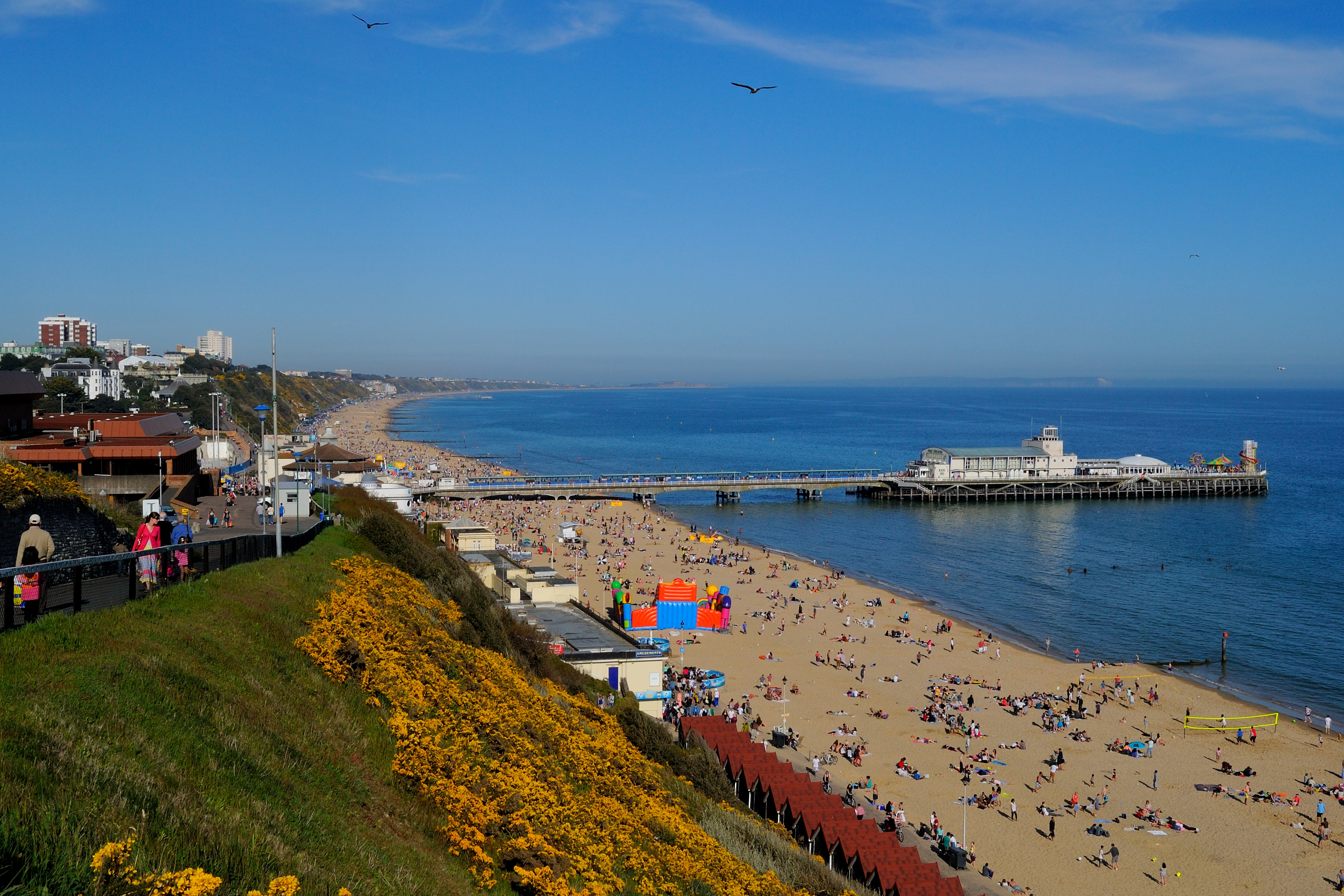
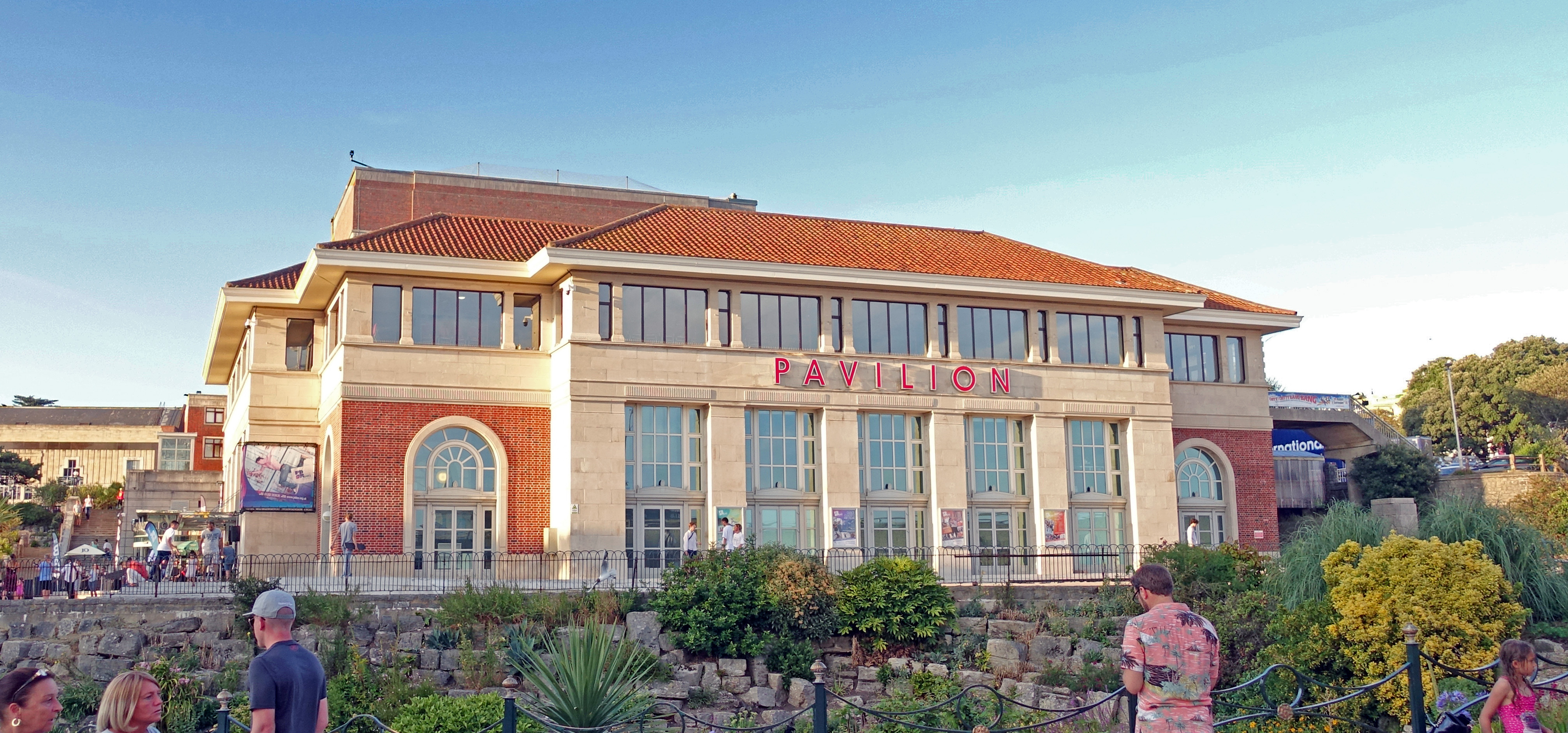
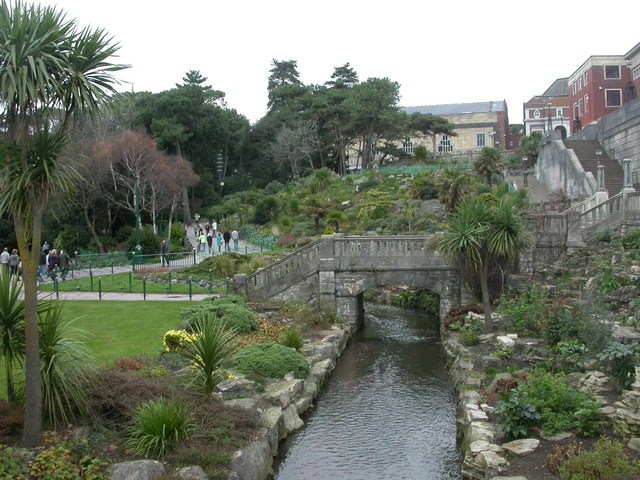
- Top to bottom, left to right: The seafront, the town hall, St. Peter's Church, Bournemouth Pier, the Pavilion Theatre and Bournemouth Gardens

- Coat of arms of Bournemouth

- Location within Dorset
- Area: 15.54 sq mi (40.2 km^{2})
- Population: 196,455 (built-up area, 2021)
  - Density: 12,642/sq mi (4,881/km^{2})
- OS grid reference: SZ086912
- Civil parish: Bournemouth
- Unitary authority: Bournemouth, Christchurch and Poole
- Ceremonial county: Dorset
- Region: South West
- Country: England
- Sovereign state: United Kingdom
- Post town: BOURNEMOUTH
- Postcode district: BH1-11
- Dialling code: 01202
- Police: Dorset
- Fire: Dorset and Wiltshire
- Ambulance: South Western
- UK Parliament: Bournemouth West, Bournemouth East
- Website: Town Council

Bournemouth (/ˈbɔːrnməθ/ BORN-məth) is a coastal resort town and civil parish in the Bournemouth, Christchurch and Poole unitary authority area, in the ceremonial county of Dorset, on the south coast of England. At the 2021 census, the built-up area had a population of 196,455, making it the largest town in Dorset.

Previously an uninhabited heathland, visited only by fishermen and occasional smugglers, a health resort was founded in the area by Lewis Tregonwell in 1810. After the Ringwood, Christchurch and Bournemouth Railway opened in 1870, Bournemouth grew into an important resort town, which today attracts over five million visitors annually for its coastline and nightlife.

The town is a population centre within the South East Dorset conurbation and is known for its seven-mile stretch of golden sand, with well-known spots including Alum Chine Beach, Durley Chine Beach, and Bournemouth Central Beach. The shoreline continues westward and gradually merges into the affluent Sandbanks area and Poole. Alongside tourism, financial services now play a significant role in the local economy.

The town centre is notable for its Victorian architecture. St Peter's Church features a 202-foot (62 m) spire and is one of three Grade I listed churches in the borough. The town has an events venue and a concert hall, the Bournemouth International Centre (BIC) and Pavilion Theatre respectively. Bournemouth is also home to the Premier League football club, AFC Bournemouth, and to Bournemouth University, which has a growing reputation in fields such as media, business and health.

== Toponymy ==
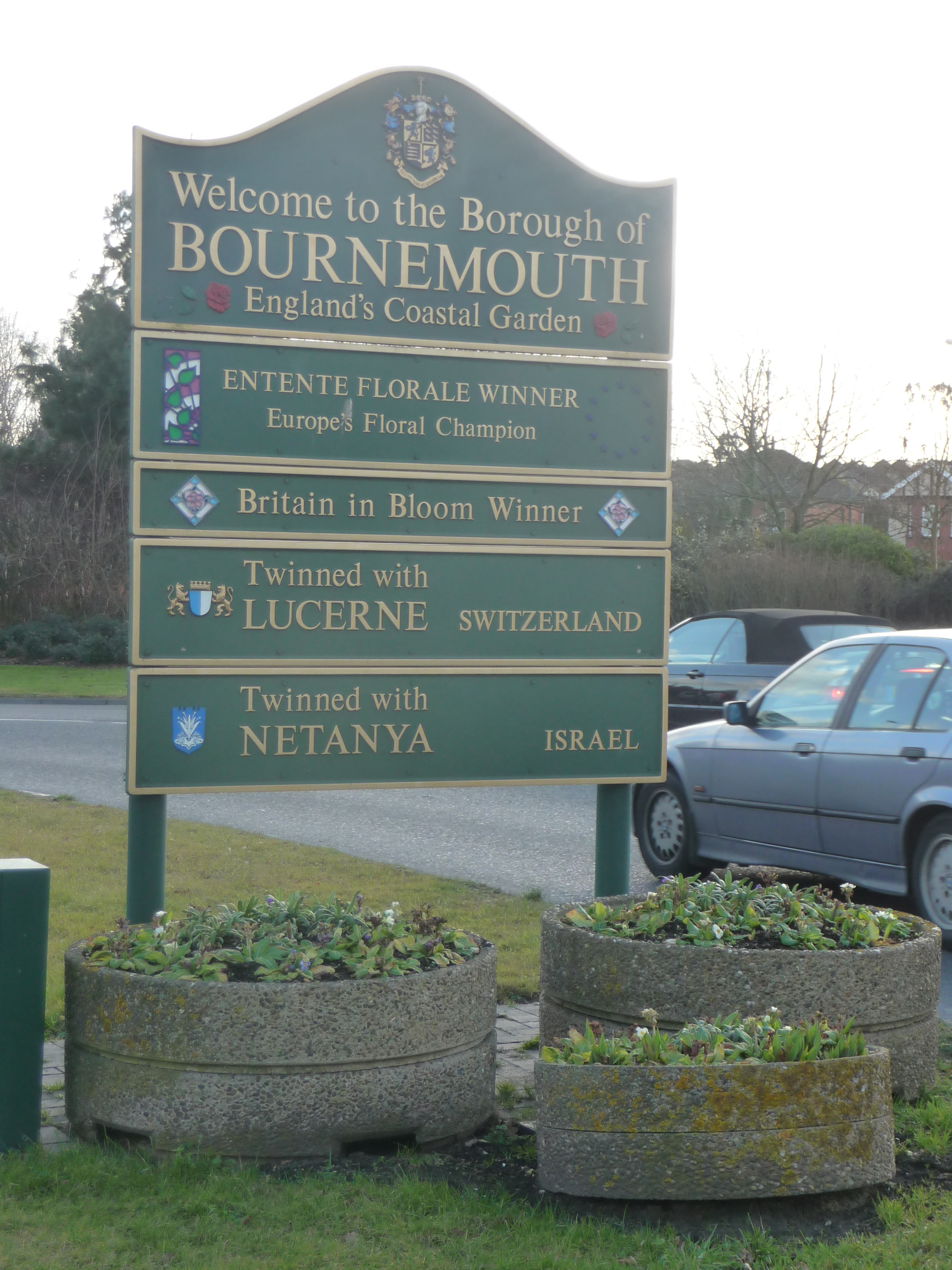
Welcome to Bournemouth, England's Coastal Garden

The first mention of Bournemouth comes in the Christchurch cartulary of 1406, where a monk describes how a large fish ("uni magno piscis"), 18 feet (5.5 metres) long, was washed up at "La Bournemothe" in October of that year and taken to the Manor of Wick; six days later, a portion of the fish was collected by a canon from Christchurch Priory and taken away as tithe. "La Bournemowthe" was purely a geographic reference to the uninhabited area around the mouth of the small river which drained the heathland between the towns of Poole and Christchurch.

The word bourne, meaning a small stream, is a derivative of burna, Old English for brook. From the latter half of the 16th century "Bourne Mouth" seems to be preferred, being recorded as such in surveys and reports of the period, but this appears to have been shortened to "Bourne" after the area had started to develop. A travel guide published in 1831 calls the place "Bourne Cliffe" or "Tregonwell's Bourne" after its founder.

The Spas of England, published ten years later, calls it simply "Bourne" as does an 1838 edition of the Hampshire Advertiser. In the late 19th century "Bournemouth" became predominant. Its two-word form appears to have remained in use up until at least the early 20th century, turning up on a 1909 ordnance map. The coat of arms of Bournemouth was granted in March 1891.

== History ==
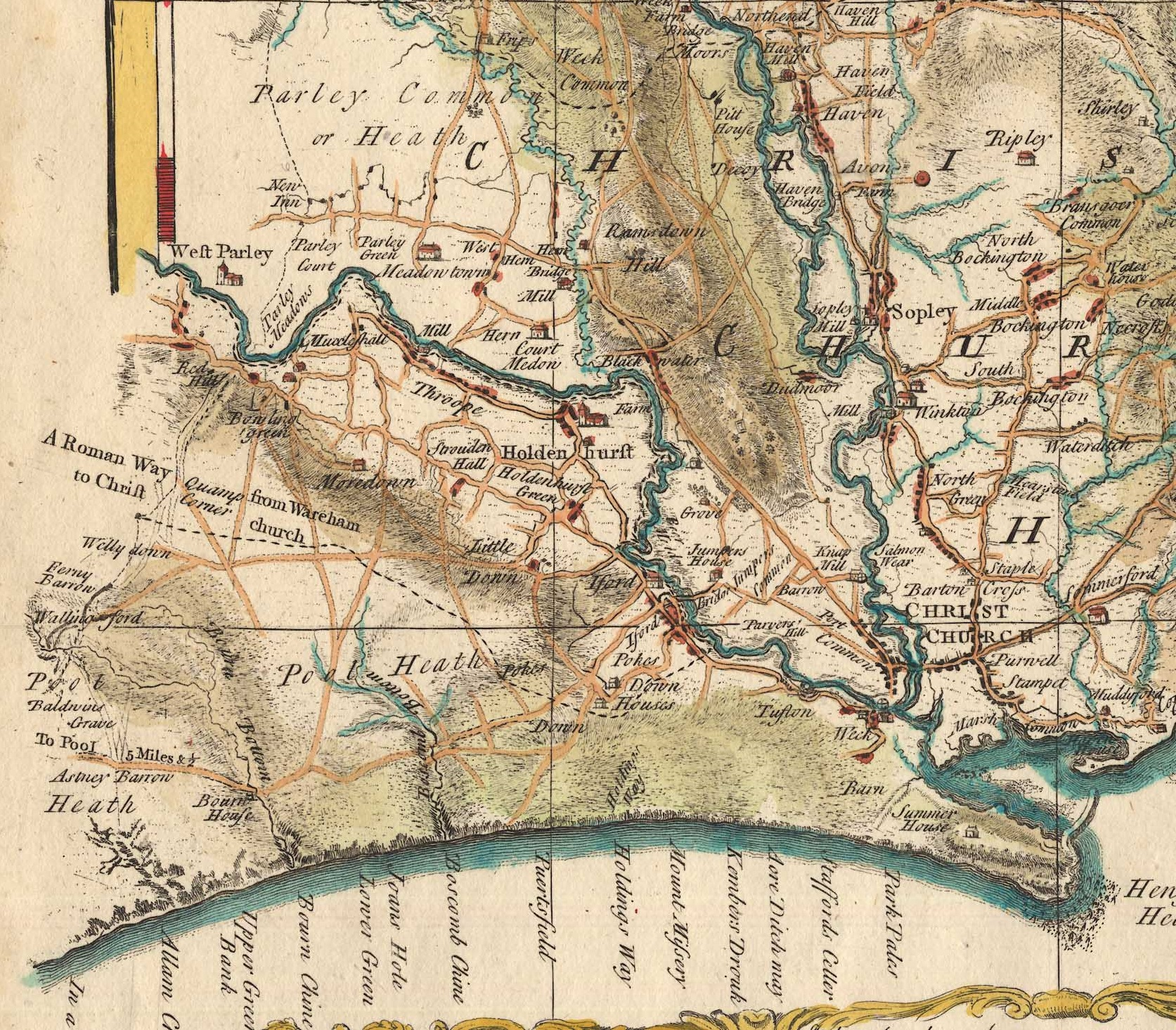
A section of a 1759 map of Hampshire by Isaac Taylor, showing the Manor of Christchurch and the area around the Bourne chine

There were some prehistoric settlements in the area, notably along the River Stour, including Longham where a skull thought to be 5,500 years old was found in 1932. Bronze Age burials near Moordown, and the discovery of Iron Age pottery on the East Cliff in 1969, suggest there may have been settlements there during that period. Hengistbury Head, added to the borough in 1932, was the site of a much older Palaeolithic encampment.

In the 12th century, the region around the mouth of the River Bourne was part of the Hundred of Holdenhurst. The hundred later became the Liberty of Westover when it was extended to include the settlements of North Ashley, Muscliff, Muccleshell, Throop, Iford, Pokesdown, Tuckton and Wick, and incorporated into the Manor of Christchurch. Although the Dorset and Hampshire region surrounding it had been the site of human settlement for thousands of years, Westover was largely a remote and barren heathland before 1800. In 1574, the Earl of Southampton said that the area was "Devoid of all habitation". As late as 1795, the Duke of Rutland recorded that "... on this barren and uncultivated heath there was not a human to direct us".

During the latter half of the 16th century James Blount, 6th Baron Mountjoy, began mining for alum in the area, and at one time part of the heath was used for hunting, although by the late 18th century little evidence of either event remained. No-one lived at the mouth of the Bourne river and the only regular visitors to the area before the 19th century were a few fishermen, turf cutters and gangs of smugglers.

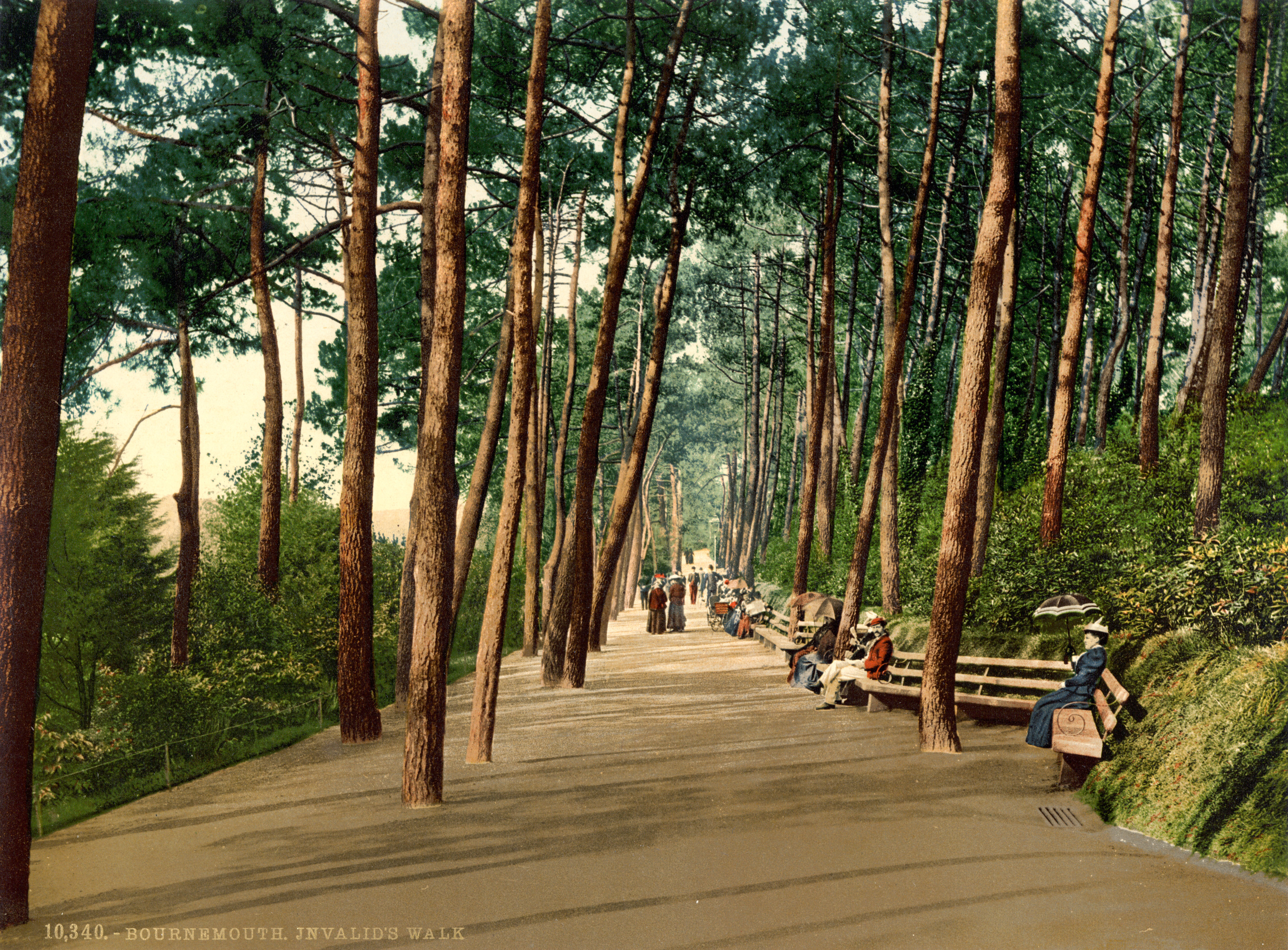
A photochrom of Invalids' Walk, 1890s

=== 19th century ===
Prior to the Christchurch Inclosures Act 1802 (42 Geo. 3. c. 43 Pr.), more than 70% of the Westover area was common land. The act, together with the Inclosure Commissioners' Award of 1805, transferred 5,000 acres (2,000 ha) into the hands of five private owners, including James Harris, 1st Earl of Malmesbury, and Sir George Ivison Tapps.

In 1809, the Tapps Arms public house was built on the heath. In 1812, the first official residents, retired army officer Lewis Tregonwell and his wife, moved into their new home built on land purchased from Tapps. The area was well known to Tregonwell who, during the Napoleonic Wars, spent much of his time searching the heath and coastline for French invaders and smugglers.

==== Rise of beach culture ====
Anticipating that people would come to the area to indulge in the newly fashionable pastime of sea-bathing, an activity with perceived health benefits, Tregonwell built a series of villas on his land between 1816 and 1822, which he hoped to let out. The common belief that pine-scented air was good for lung conditions, and in particular tuberculosis, prompted Tregonwell and Tapps to plant hundreds of pine trees. These early attempts to promote the town as a health resort meant that by the time Tregonwell died in 1832, Bournemouth had grown into a small community with a scattering of houses, villas and cottages. The town ultimately grew around the scattered pines and tree-lined walk to the beach, later to become known as the Invalids' Walk.

After the death of Tapps in 1835, his son Sir George William Tapps-Gervis inherited his father's estate. He hired the young local architect Benjamin Ferrey to develop Bournemouth Gardens along the coastal area on the east side of the stream. Bournemouth's first hotel, later to become part of the Royal Bath Hotel, opened in 1838 and is one of the few buildings designed by Ferrey still standing and operating. Bournemouth grew at a fast rate, with Tapps-Gervis developing the area similarly to the south coast resorts of Weymouth and Brighton. Despite enormous investment, the town's share of the market remained modest.

In 1841, Tapps-Gervis invited the physician and writer Augustus Granville to stay. Granville was the author of The Spas of England, which described health resorts around the country, and as a result of his visit, he included a chapter on Bournemouth in the second edition of his book. The publication of the book, and the increase in visitors seeking the medicinal use of seawater and the pine-scented air, helped the town to grow and establish itself as an early tourist destination.

In the 1840s Benjamin Ferrey was replaced by Decimus Burton, whose plans for Bournemouth included the construction of Bournemouth Gardens alongside the Bourne stream, an idea first mooted by Granville. The fields south of the road crossing, later Bournemouth Square, were drained and laid out with shrubberies and walks. Many of these paths, including the Invalids' Walk, remain in the town today. A second suggestion of Granville's, a sanatorium, was completed in 1855 and greatly raised Bournemouth's profile as a place for recuperation.

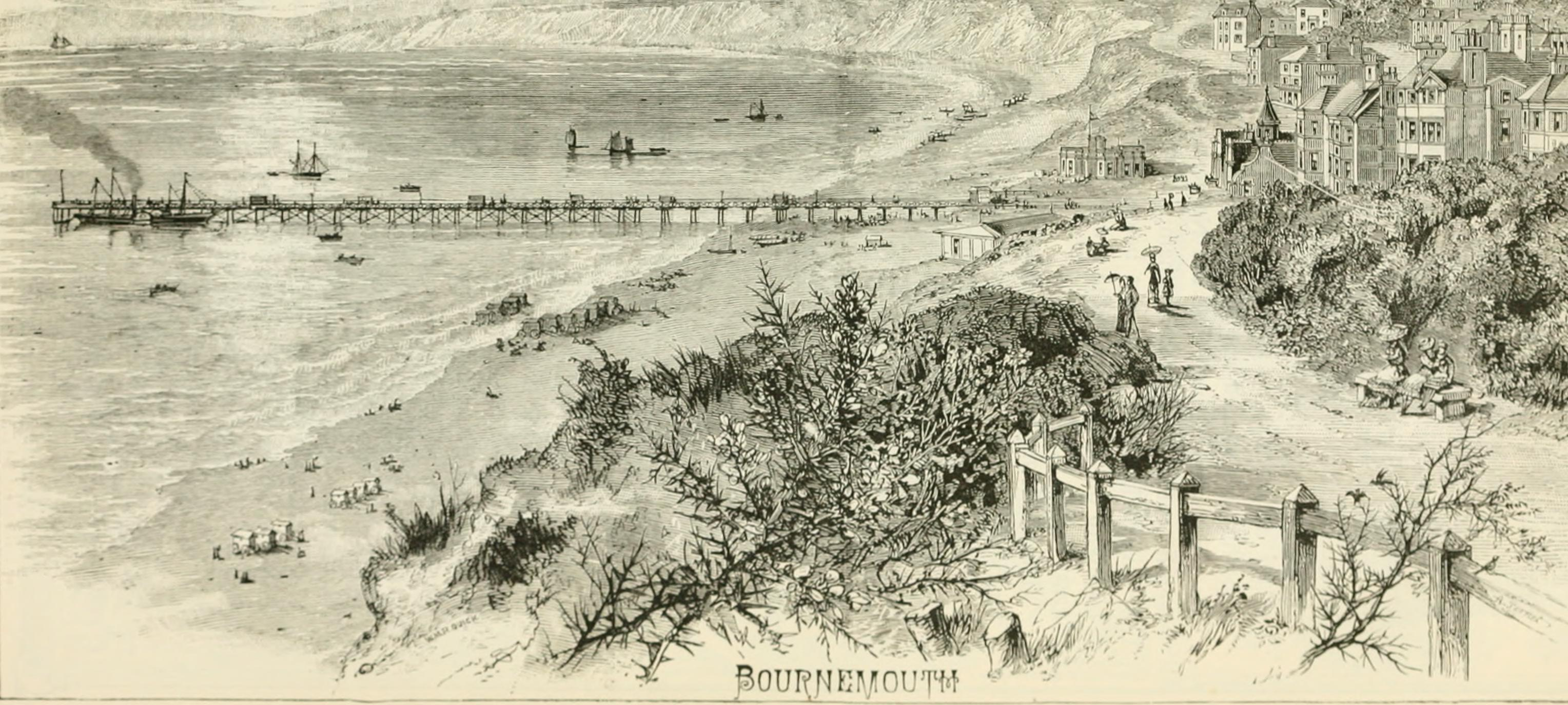
A view of Bournemouth showing the temporary wooden jetty that was replaced by an iron pier in 1880

At a time when the most convenient way to arrive in the town was by sea, a pier was considered to be a necessity. The Holdenhurst parish vestry was reluctant to find the money, and an attempt to raise funds privately in 1847 only succeeded in financing a small 100-foot (30 m) jetty. The Bournemouth Improvement Act 1856 (19 & 20 Vict. c. xc) granted greater financial autonomy to the town and a pier was approved that year. A number of wooden structures were built before an 838 feet (255 m) cast iron design by Eugenius Birch was completed in 1880. Under the Act, a board of 13 Commissioners was established to build and organise the expanding infrastructure of the town, such as paving, sewers, drainage, street lighting and street cleaning.

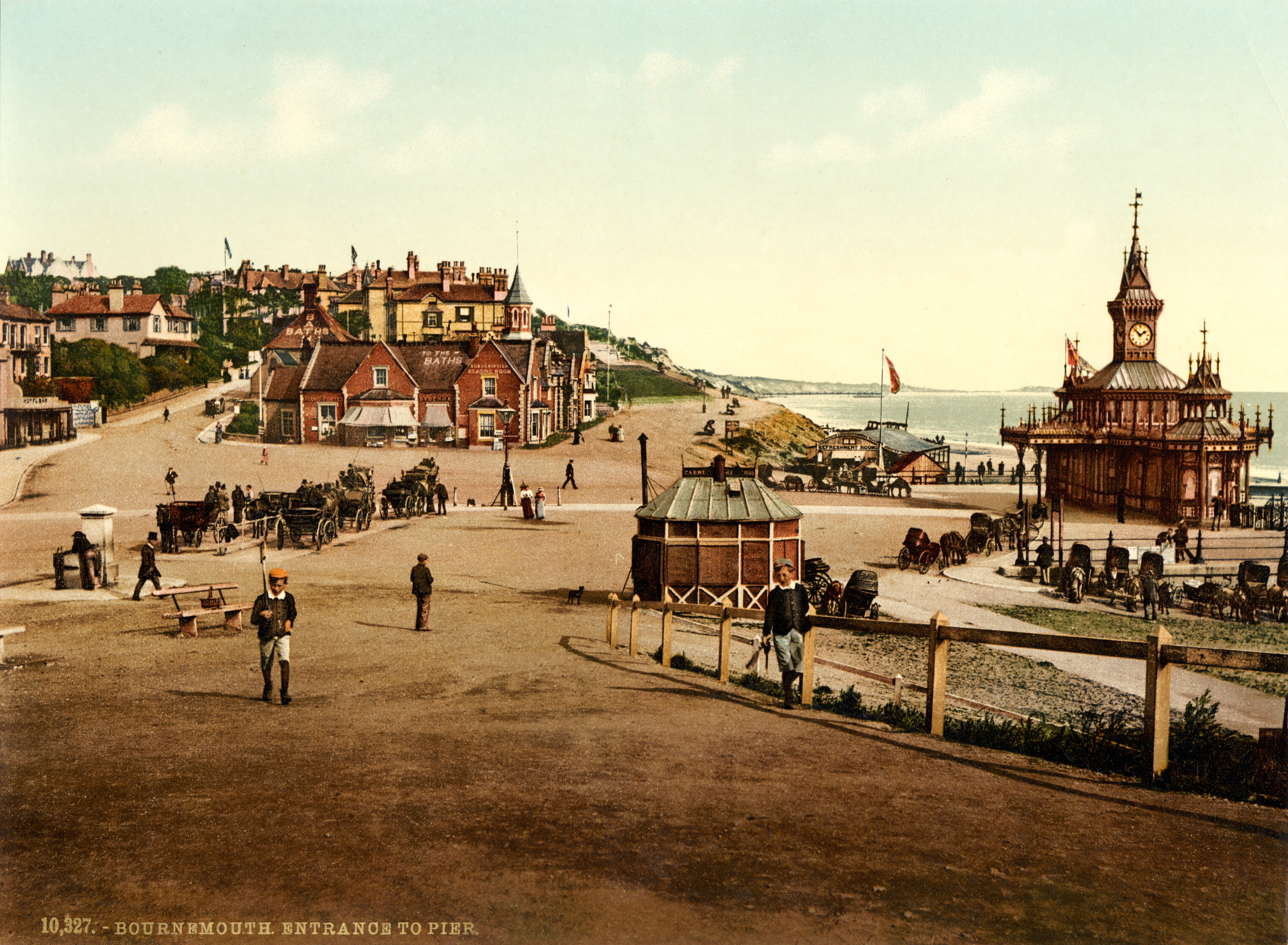
A photochrom of the entrance to the pier, 1890s

==== Introduction of railways and mass tourism ====
In 1870, the arrival of the railways precipitated a massive growth in seaside and summer visitors to the town, especially from the Midlands and London. In 1880, Bournemouth had a population of 17,000. In 1900, when railway connections to Bournemouth were at their most developed, the town's population had risen to 60,000 and it had become a favourite location for visiting artists and writers.

Bournemouth was greatly improved during this period through the efforts of Sir Merton Russell-Cotes, the town's mayor and a local philanthropist, who helped to establish improved's first library and museum. The Russell-Cotes Art Gallery & Museum was housed in his mansion. After his death, it was given to the town. Bournemouth became a municipal borough in 1890 and a county borough in 1900.

=== 20th century ===
As Bournemouth's growth increased in the early 20th century, the town centre spawned theatres, cafés, two art deco cinemas, and more hotels. Bournemouth Corporation Tramways was established in 1902, becoming the town's first public transport system. In 1908, a deadly tram crash in the town gardens killed seven people. Other new buildings constructed included the war memorial in 1921 and the Bournemouth Pavilion, the town's concert hall and grand theatre, finished in 1925.

The Bournemouth Blitz saw heavy damage to the town during the Second World War despite initially escaping heavy bombing. A raid by German fighter bombers on 23 May 1943 killed 131 people and damaged 3,359 buildings, with two large hotels being completely destroyed. It is believed that the large number of RAF airmen billeted in the town may have been the reason for the attack. The seafront incurred damage when it was fortified against invasion. The cast iron lampposts and benches along the beach were removed and melted down for munitions, as was much of the superstructure from both Bournemouth and Boscombe piers, before they were breached to prevent their use by enemy ships. The large amounts of barbed wire and anti-tank obstacles along the beach, and the mines at the foot of the chines, took two years to remove when peace was achieved.

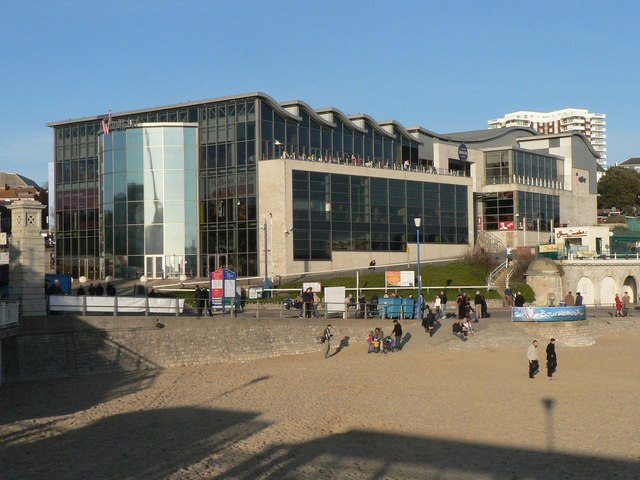
The Waterfront Cinema and Leisure Complex, now demolished

The Royal National Lifeboat Institution stationed an inshore lifeboat at Bournemouth between 1965 and 1972. Coverage for the area has otherwise been provided from Poole Lifeboat Station. In 1984, the Bournemouth International Centre (BIC), a large conference and exhibition centre, was constructed near the seafront. In 1985, Bournemouth was the first town in the United Kingdom to introduce and use CCTV cameras for public street-based surveillance.

In August 1993, the IRA orchestrated a terrorist attack in the town centre. The only injuries sustained were minor, but over £1 million in damage was caused.

=== 21st century ===
From 2000 to 2001 the Tesco bomb campaign hit the town with a plot to extort money from Supermarket giant Tesco. Visitors to the town plummeted during the campaign, especially after a bomb exploded at an elderly woman's home after she opened a letter sent by the bomber. During the eight months, over seven bombs were found by Dorset Police, ranging from small letter bombs, to pipe bombs and parcel bombs. The culprit was found to be Robert Edward Dyer, he was sentenced to 12 years in prison.

In 1998, the Waterfront complex, which was intended to hold an IMAX cinema, was constructed on the seafront. The 19-metre-high (62-foot) concrete and smoked glass building featured a wavy roof design, but was despised by residents and visitors alike because it blocked views of the bay and the Isle of Purbeck. In 2005, it was voted the most hated building in England in a 10,000-person poll conducted by the Channel 4 programme Demolition, and was pulled down in spring 2013.

Bournemouth was twice unsuccessful in its bids for city status, first at the Diamond Jubilee of Elizabeth II in 2012, and again in the Platinum Jubilee Civic Honours in 2022.

== Governance ==
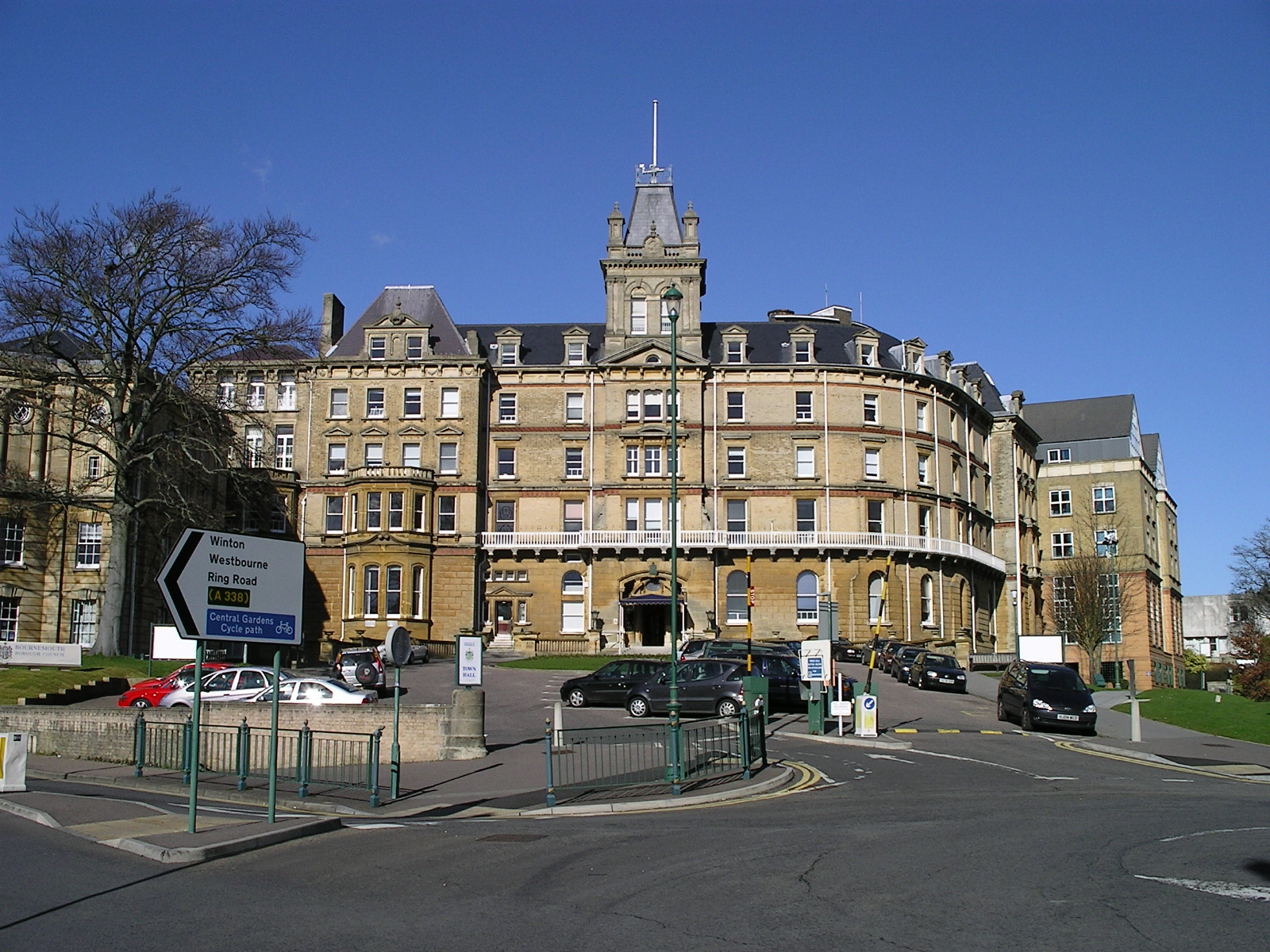
The Civic Centre, built in 1885 as the Mont Dore Hotel, was converted to Bournemouth Town Hall in 1921.

The unitary authority for the area is Bournemouth, Christchurch and Poole Council, which is based at the Civic Centre, formerly known as Bournemouth Town Hall, on Bourne Avenue in Bournemouth. As of April 2026, Bournemouth Town Council is in the process of being established. The civil parish was formed on 1 April 2026.

=== Administrative history ===
The area that is now Bournemouth was historically mostly within the ancient parish of Christchurch in Hampshire. A chapel of ease was established at Holdenhurst to serve the west of the parish. From medieval times, the chapelry of Holdenhurst came to be treated as a separate civil parish.

When the development of Bournemouth began in 1810, the site straddled the parishes of Holdenhurst and Christchurch. In 1845, an ecclesiastical parish of Bournemouth was created, but for civil purposes there was no change. In 1856, a body of improvement commissioners was established to provide local government services in the town.

In 1890, Bournemouth was incorporated as a municipal borough. In 1900, it was elevated to the status of a county borough, making it independent from Hampshire County Council, whilst remaining part of the geographical county of Hampshire. The borough boundaries were enlarged on several occasions. In 1901, it absorbed Pokesdown, Southbourne and Winton. In 1931, it absorbed Holdenhurst and Kinson. Kinson was transferred from Dorset to Hampshire on its absorption into Bournemouth. In 1921, the borough council bought the former Mont Dore Hotel on Bourne Avenue, which had been completed in 1885, and converted into the Town Hall.

On 1 April 1974, the county borough of Bournemouth was reconstituted as a non-metropolitan district under the Local Government Act 1972. The district kept the same boundaries, but was transferred from Hampshire to Dorset, it being considered desirable that the whole of the South East Dorset conurbation should be in the same county. No successor parish was formed so it became unparished. Bournemouth's borough status was transferred to the new district, allowing the council to take the name Bournemouth Borough Council and giving the chair of the council the title of mayor, continuing Bournemouth's series of mayors dating back to 1890.

In April 1997, Bournemouth Borough Council became a unitary authority, taking over the provision of county council functions from Dorset County Council.

In April 2019, the nine councils of Dorset were merged into two. Bournemouth became part of a unitary authority with Christchurch and Poole, known as BCP. For the purposes of Lieutenancy it remains part of the ceremonial county of Dorset. When Bournemouth Borough Council was abolished 2019, it has had charter trustees, being the BCP councillors representing wards in the former borough of Bournemouth. The trustees preserved the town's civic charters and traditions, including appointing one of their number each year to serve as mayor.

In October 2024, BCP Council resolved to conduct a community governance review which could lead to the creation of town and parish councils in its area. An initial draft recommended creation of a Bournemouth parish which would elect a town council, alongside creation of parish councils in the surrounding area and a town council for Poole. Establishment of Bournemouth Town Council was approved in October 2025, with the first elections to be held in May 2026.

=== Parliamentary representation ===
Bournemouth is represented by two parliamentary constituencies in the House of Commons, Bournemouth East and Bournemouth West. In the 2024 general election, Bournemouth East was won for Labour by Tom Hayes with 40.8% of the vote. Bournemouth West was won for Labour by Jessica Toale with 36.4%. Both had previously been considered Conservative safe seats. In 2022, both of the town's Conservative MPs – Conor Burns and Tobias Ellwood – had the whip withdrawn, forcing them to sit as Independents.

== Geography ==
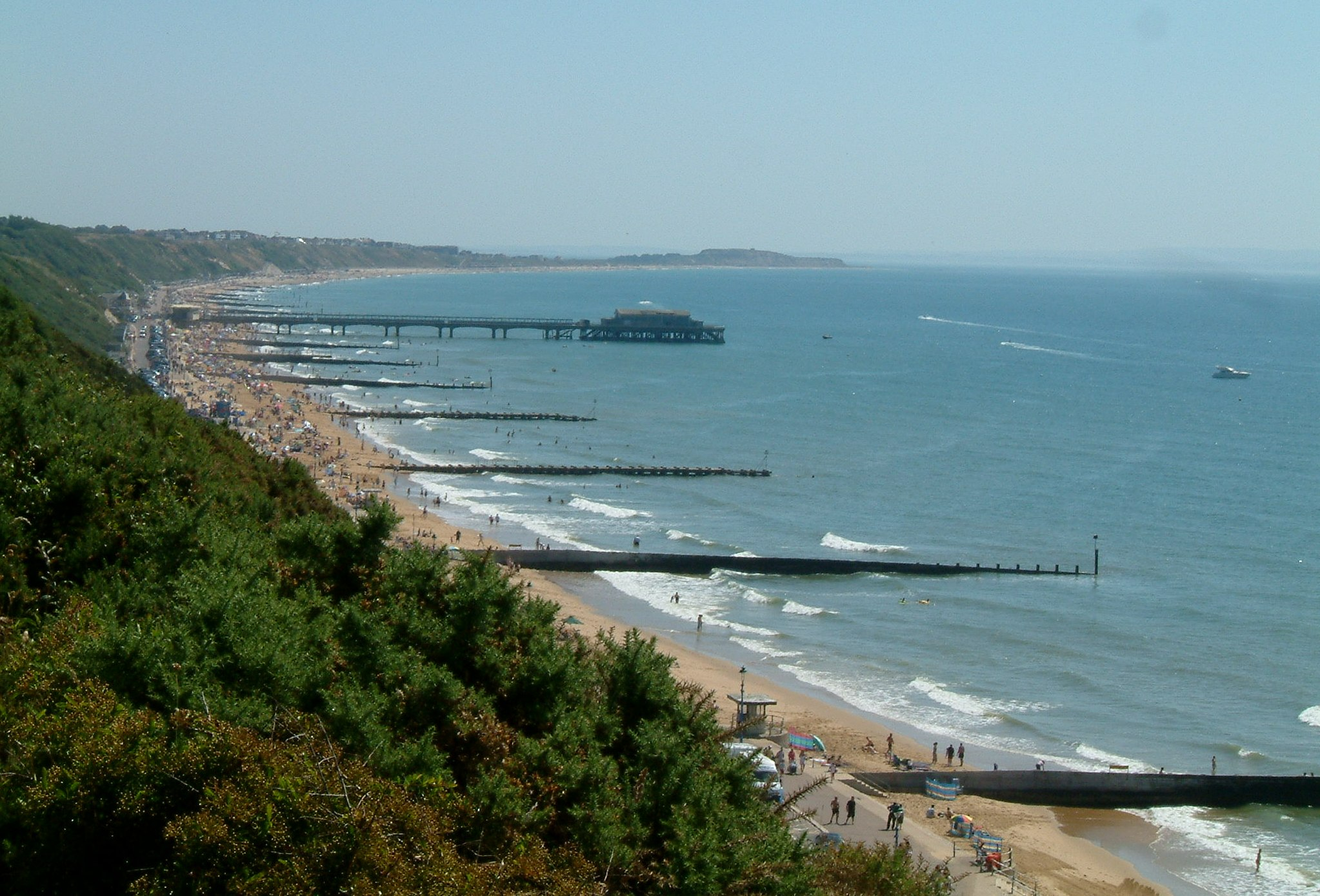
Bournemouth Beach and Boscombe Pier

Bournemouth is about 94 miles (151 km) southwest of London. The town borders the neighbouring towns of Poole and Christchurch to the west and east respectively. Poole Bay lies to the south. The River Stour forms a natural boundary to the north and east, terminating at Christchurch Harbour. The River Bourne rises in Poole and flows through the middle of Bournemouth town centre, into the English Channel. The towns of Poole, Bournemouth and Christchurch form the South East Dorset conurbation with a combined population of over 400,000. Bournemouth is both a retail and commercial centre. Areas within Bournemouth include: Boscombe, Kinson, Southbourne, Springbourne, Throop, Westbourne, Winton and Pokesdown.

The area's geology has little variety, comprising almost entirely of Eocene clays which, prior to urbanisation, supported a heathland environment. Patches of the original heath still remain, notably Turbary Common, a 36-hectare (89-acre; 0.14 sq mi; 0.36 km^{2}) site, much of which is designated a Site of Special Scientific Interest. This heathland habitat is home to all six species of native reptile, the Dartford warbler and some important flora such as sundew and bog asphodel. Small populations of Exmoor pony and Shetland cattle help to maintain the area.

Bournemouth is directly north of Old Harry Rocks which mark the easternmost end of the Jurassic Coast, 96 miles (155 km) of coastline designated a World Heritage Site in 2001. Bournemouth's coastline stretches from Sandbanks to Christchurch Harbour and is mainly sandy beaches backed by gravel and sandy clay cliffs. These cliffs are cut by a number of chines, which provide natural access to the shore. At the easternmost point lies Hengistbury Head, a narrow peninsula that forms the southern shore of Christchurch Harbour. It is a local nature reserve and the site of a Bronze Age settlement.

=== Climate ===
Like all of the UK, Bournemouth has a temperate oceanic climate with moderate variation in annual and daily temperatures, mild summers, and cool winters. From 1991 to 2020 the annual mean temperature was 10 to 11 °C (50 to 52 °F). The warmest months are July and August, which have an average temperature range of 12 to 22 °C (54 to 72 °F). The coolest months are January and February, which have an average temperature range of 2 to 9 °C (36 to 48 °F). Average rainfall in Bournemouth is around 34.4 inches (875 mm) annually, well below the national average of 45.8 inches (1,163 mm). It records both higher and lower temperatures than would be expected for its coastal location.

Since 1957, temperature extremes as measured at Bournemouth Hurn Airport have ranged from 36.1 °C (97.0 °F) on 25 June 2026, breaking the record of 34.1 °C (93.4 °F) set in August 1990, down to −13.4 °C (7.9 °F) in January 1963. The lowest temperature recorded in recent years was −10.4 °C (13.3 °F) in December 2010. The February and winter month record high was broken in 2019, with a temperature of 17.8 °C (64.0 °F).

Climate data for Bournemouth Airport (BOH), elevation: 10 m (33 ft) (1991-2020 normals, extremes 1957-present)
Month	Jan	Feb	Mar	Apr	May	Jun	Jul	Aug	Sep	Oct	Nov	Dec	Year
Record high °C (°F)	14.7 (58.5)	17.8 (64.0)	21.0 (69.8)	25.0 (77.0)	31.5 (88.7)	36.1 (97.0)	33.9 (93.0)	34.1 (93.4)	29.5 (85.1)	25.2 (77.4)	17.7 (63.9)	16.0 (60.8)	36.1 (97.0)
Mean daily maximum °C (°F)	8.7 (47.7)	9.1 (48.4)	11.4 (52.5)	14.2 (57.6)	17.4 (63.3)	20.1 (68.2)	22.2 (72.0)	22.0 (71.6)	19.6 (67.3)	15.6 (60.1)	11.8 (53.2)	9.2 (48.6)	15.1 (59.2)
Daily mean °C (°F)	5.3 (41.5)	5.4 (41.7)	7.1 (44.8)	9.3 (48.7)	12.4 (54.3)	15.2 (59.4)	17.2 (63.0)	17.0 (62.6)	14.6 (58.3)	11.5 (52.7)	8.0 (46.4)	5.6 (42.1)	10.7 (51.3)
Mean daily minimum °C (°F)	1.8 (35.2)	1.6 (34.9)	2.8 (37.0)	4.3 (39.7)	7.3 (45.1)	10.2 (50.4)	12.1 (53.8)	12.0 (53.6)	9.6 (49.3)	7.4 (45.3)	4.1 (39.4)	2.0 (35.6)	6.3 (43.3)
Record low °C (°F)	−13.4 (7.9)	−11 (12)	−10.2 (13.6)	−5.7 (21.7)	−3.6 (25.5)	0.4 (32.7)	2.6 (36.7)	2.1 (35.8)	−1.4 (29.5)	−6.4 (20.5)	−9.6 (14.7)	−10.5 (13.1)	−13.4 (7.9)
Average precipitation mm (inches)	96.0 (3.78)	67.2 (2.65)	62.4 (2.46)	57.9 (2.28)	49.0 (1.93)	53.4 (2.10)	49.5 (1.95)	59.6 (2.35)	69.3 (2.73)	100.7 (3.96)	107.6 (4.24)	104.2 (4.10)	876.7 (34.52)
Average precipitation days (≥ 1.0 mm)	13.3	10.7	10.1	9.5	8.2	8.0	8.0	8.1	9.5	12.7	13.6	13.5	125.3
Average relative humidity (%)	87	85	81	78	77	76	76	78	81	84	87	88	82
Average dew point °C (°F)	4 (39)	3 (37)	4 (39)	5 (41)	8 (46)	11 (52)	13 (55)	13 (55)	11 (52)	9 (48)	6 (43)	4 (39)	8 (46)
Mean monthly sunshine hours	67.2	83.7	127.5	187.9	222.7	230.4	234.3	208.5	163.5	113.0	78.9	61.1	1,778.8
Source 1: Met Office
Source 2: Starlings Roost Weather Time and Date

Average sea temperature
Jan	Feb	Mar	Apr	May	Jun	Jul	Aug	Sep	Oct	Nov	Dec	Year
9.6 °C (49.3 °F)	9.1 °C (48.4 °F)	8.7 °C (47.7 °F)	9.9 °C (49.8 °F)	11.4 °C (52.5 °F)	13.4 °C (56.1 °F)	15.2 °C (59.4 °F)	16.6 °C (61.9 °F)	17.3 °C (63.1 °F)	16.2 °C (61.2 °F)	14.3 °C (57.7 °F)	11.8 °C (53.2 °F)	12.8 °C (55.0 °F)

=== Green belt ===
Bournemouth lies at the centre of a green belt region that extends into the wider surrounding counties. It is in place to reduce urban sprawl, prevent the towns in the South East Dorset conurbation from further convergence, protect the identity of outlying communities, and preserve nearby countryside. This is achieved by restricting inappropriate development within the designated areas, and imposing stricter conditions on permitted building.

Bournemouth has small areas of green belt within its district to the north and east, mostly along the fringes of the shared border with the Christchurch and East Dorset districts. These cover landscape features and greenfield facilities including the River Stour, Stour Valley Way, Millhams Mead and Stour Valley nature reserves and arboretum, Hengistbury Head, and the small communities of Throop and Holdenhurst. Turbary Park is a heathland which is a protected Site of Special Scientific Interest.

== Demography ==
Religious demography, 2011.
Religion	% Population	Religion	% Population	Religion	% Population
Christian	57.1	Buddhist	0.7	Hindu	0.7
Jewish	0.7	Muslim	1.8	Sikh	0.1
Other religion	0.7	No religion	30.5	Not stated	7.8

In 2011 the population was 183,491, with 91,386 males and 92,105 females, which equates to 49.8% and 50.2% of the population respectively. In 2011, the mean average age was 40 years. With 4,000 residents per square kilometre, Bournemouth has the highest population density of any authority in the South-West region, and is the eighth most populated.

In 2011, 83.8% of the population described their ethnicity as 'White British'. Other white groups accounted for 8.1%. Asian groups; Indian, Pakistani, Bangladeshi, Chinese and other Asian, made up 3.9%. Black British, Black African, Black Caribbean and other Black groups were 1.0% of the population. Those of Mixed race were 2.3% of the population, and 0.9% were from other ethnic groups.

In 2011, Christians were 57.1% of the population. 30% of residents said they had no religion and 7.8% declined to say whether they were religious or not. Muslims were 1.8%. Buddhists, Hindus and Jews each had a 0.7% share, Sikhs were 0.1%. and other religions made up 0.7%.

Historical population of Bournemouth
Year	Population	Year	Population	Year	Population
1801	726	1871	13,160	1941	128,099
1811	738	1881	18,725	1951	144,531
1821	877	1891	34,098	1961	149,106
1831	1,104	1901	52,981	1971	153,906
1841	1,605	1911	82,424	1981	140,216
1851	2,029	1921	96,741	1991	158,711
1861	7,594	1931	113,557	2001	163,441
Historical population figures are for an area that equates to the modern Unitary Authority of Bournemouth; Source: GIS / University of Portsmouth, A Vision of Britain through Time.

In 2011, of Bournemouth residents aged 16 or over, 19.1% had no qualifications at all. 35% said they had between one and four O-levels, CSEs, GCSEs or equivalent. 36.5% have more than five O-level equivalents (grade C and above), an A-level or two to three AS-levels. 8.0% of residents had a NVQ level 1. 15.2% had a level 2 NVQ, a City and Guilds craft certificate, BTEC or general diploma. Just over 20% of residents had two or more A-levels, four or more AS-Levels or an advanced diploma.

15.8% possessed a degree, such as a BA or BSc or a higher degree such as an MA or PhD. An NVQ level 4 or 5, HNC, HND, higher BTEC or higher diploma, is held by 4.2%. A professional qualification is held by 13.9% of residents. An apprenticeship has been completed by 6.3% of the population. 16.9% have some other work-related or vocational qualification. 8.3% hold a foreign qualification.

Historically, Bournemouth has had negative rates of natural increase and has relied on immigration to maintain population growth. In 2007, births exceeded deaths for the first time, and this trend has continued through to 2011. This, coupled with a substantial increase in people moving into the area, has led to a sharp rise in the resident population since 2001.

Of the population, 3.3% are 85 or over, compared to 2.2% nationally. The largest group of people moving into the area are students in the 16–24-year age group. 9% of the current population are between 20 and 24. In England this age group accounts for 7%. In 2016, Bournemouth's population had the third highest average resident age, among 63 large towns and cities in the UK, at 42.8 years.

== Economy ==
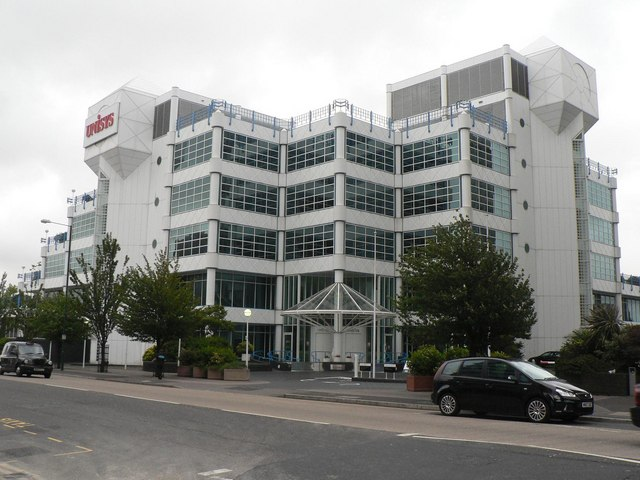
Financial services are crucial to the town's economy and Unisys was a major employer in the industry.

Similarly to the rest of Dorset, Bournemouth's economy is primarily in the service sector, which employed 95% of the workforce in 2010. This was 10% higher than the average employment in the service sector for Great Britain and 11% higher than the South West. Of particular importance are the financial and public service sectors which through 2011 continued to show sustained growth. Compared to the rest of the country, Bournemouth performed well in these two areas but under performed in transport and communications.

The smallest geographical region for which gross value added information is available is the NUTS3 area, Bournemouth and Poole. In 2009, the Bournemouth and Poole area enjoyed the strongest annualised growth in the South-West region. In 2009, the South West Regional Accounts showed that the Financial Services sector in Bournemouth was worth £1,031.8 million in Gross Value Added. Important employers in this sector include JPMorgan, Nationwide Building Society, and the Liverpool Victoria, Tata Consultancy Services (formerly Unisys), and RIAS insurance companies. The manufacturing sector is predominantly based in neighbouring Poole, and employed 2% of the workforce in 2010 and 2.6% in 2011. (Note: Agriculture data is excluded from ONS figures at a sub-regional level, therefore an estimate has been made using DEFRA 2010 data. As there is little farming within the Bournemouth area, this has a minimal effect.) Notable employers in this sector include Escor Toys and Parvalux.

Tourism is important to the local economy. In 2011, domestic and overseas visitors made more than 5.6 million trips to the town and spent over £460 million between them. Tourism supported 8,531 full-time jobs, accounting for 15% of employment in Bournemouth. Bournemouth seafront is one of the UK's biggest attractions, with 4.5 million visitors in 2011. RNLI lifeguards provide seasonal coverage of Bournemouth's beaches.

With a third of all town centre businesses in the leisure industry, Bournemouth has a booming nightlife economy and is a popular destination for stag and hen parties. These party-goers contribute £125 million a year to the economy and support 4,000 jobs. In 2010, Bournemouth was awarded a Purple Flag for providing a wide variety of night-time activities while maintaining the safety of both residents and visitors. An independent report published in 2012 indicates there has been a rise in antisocial behaviour which it attributes to the increase in nightlife.

Those of working age make up approximately 65% of Bournemouth's population. Of these, 74.6% are economically active, although not necessarily employed within the Bournemouth area. In 2011, the Bournemouth economy employed more than 76,400 people, but not all of these were Bournemouth residents. Of those employed in Bournemouth based industries, 29.32% were employed in the public administration, education and health sector. This compares favourably with Dorset, the South-West region, and the country as a whole. Distribution, hotels & restaurants employed 29.06%. Banking, finance and insurance employed 24.48%.

In 2011, 37.2% of Bournemouth's resident population were employed full-time. 13.3% were employed part-time. 7.1% full-time workers are self-employed, and 3.1% are self-employed part-time. Full-time students with jobs were 5.3%. 3.8% were unemployed.

The shopping streets are mostly pedestrianised with modern shopping malls, Victorian arcades and a large selection of bars, clubs, and cafés. Westover Road in central Bournemouth has been referred to in local press as the "Bond Street of Bournemouth" due to the shops there, one of which has been present since 1909, selling predominantly high-end goods. North of the centre there is an out-of-town shopping complex called Castlepoint. The 41-acre (17 ha) site has 40 units and was the largest shopping centre in the UK when it opened it 2003. Other major shopping areas are in the districts of Westbourne and Boscombe.

Employment by sector (2011)
	Agriculture & Fishing	Energy & Water	Manufacturing	Construction	Distribution, Hotels & Restaurants	Transport & Communication	Banking, Finance & Insurance	Public admin, Education & Health	Other Industry
Bournemouth	0.00%*	0.52%	2.62%	3.14%	29.06%	6.28%	24.48%	29.32%	4.58%
Dorset	0.38%*	1.14%	11.16%	6.66%	27.58%	5.20%	13.51%	29.55%	4.82%
South West region	2.91%	1.25%	9.20%	4.92%	25.12%	7.16%	18.20%	27.25%	4.01%
England & Wales	1.55%	1.12%	8.59%	4.72%	22.96%	8.51%	21.40%	26.56%	4.59%
*Figures exclude farm agriculture

== Culture ==
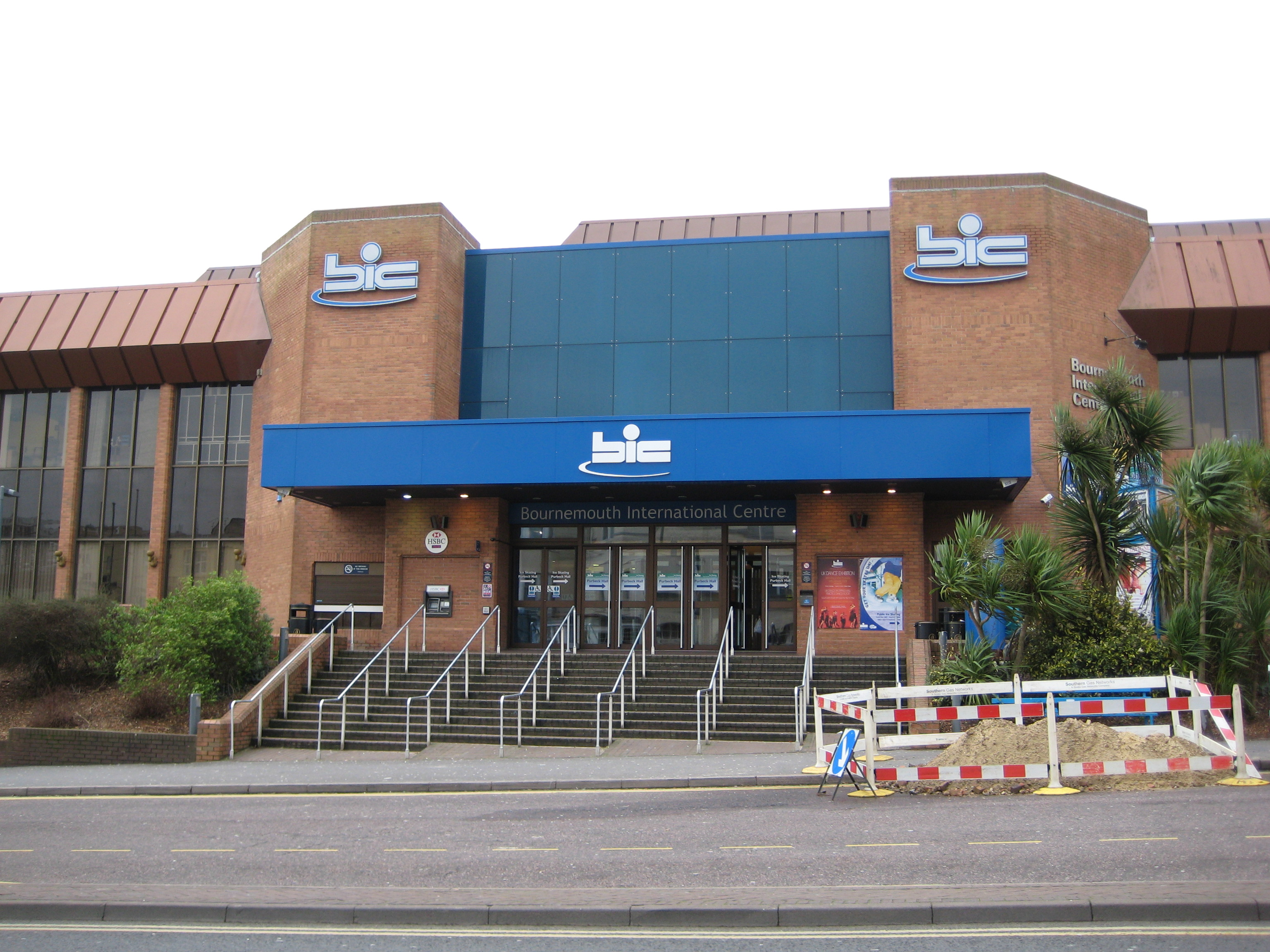
Bournemouth International Centre (BIC) is a national conference and music venue in the town.

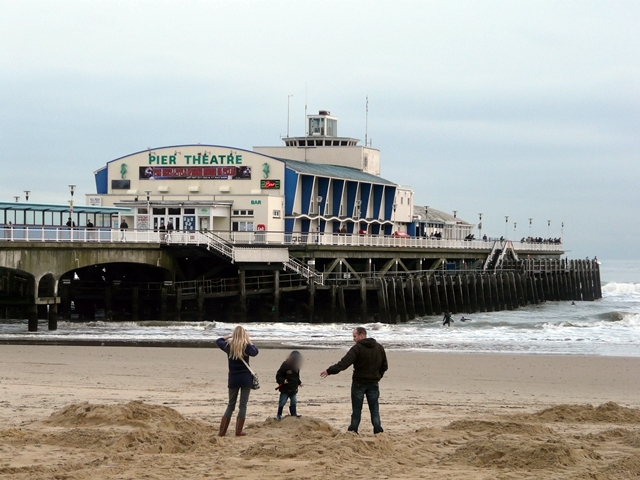
Bournemouth Pier and the Pier Theatre

Bournemouth is a tourist and regional centre for leisure, entertainment, culture and recreation. Local author and former mayor, Keith Rawlings, suggests that Bournemouth has a thriving youth culture due to its large university population and many language school students. In recent years, Bournemouth has become a popular nightlife destination with UK visitors and many clubs, bars and restaurants are located within the town centre. In a 2007 survey by First Direct, Bournemouth was found to be the happiest place in the UK, with 82% of people questioned saying they were happy with their lives.

Major venues for concerts include BIC, Pavilion Theatre and O2 Academy. Built in 1984, the BIC is also a popular place for party political conferences and has been used by all three major political parties. Its four auditoria make it the largest venue on the south coast. The O2 and Pavilion are older and are both Grade II listed buildings. The O2, which opened in 1895 as the Grand Pavilion Theatre, was initially used as a circus and later for music hall theatre. The Pavilion opened in 1929 as concert hall and tea room while providing a venue for the municipal orchestra. It continues to provide traditional entertainment today, presenting West End stage shows, ballet and operas.

The Palace Court Theatre opened in 1931, was later used as a Christian centre, and has recently been bought and reopened as a theatre by Arts University Bournemouth. Bournemouth has more than 200 listed buildings, mainly from the Victorian and Edwardian eras, including three Grade I listed churches: St Peter's (largely by the architect G. E. Street), St Clement's (the first major church by J. D. Sedding) and St Stephen's (considered a masterpiece of J. L. Pearson's).

The Russell-Cotes Museum is a Grade II* listed villa completed in 1901. It houses artefacts and paintings collected by the Victorian philanthropist Merton Russell-Cotes and his wife during their extensive travels around the world. The four art galleries display paintings by William Powell Frith, Edwin Landseer, Edwin Long, William Orchardson, Arthur Hughes, Albert Moore and Dante Gabriel Rossetti. It was Russell-Cotes who successfully campaigned to have a promenade built; it runs continuously along the Bournemouth and Poole shoreline.

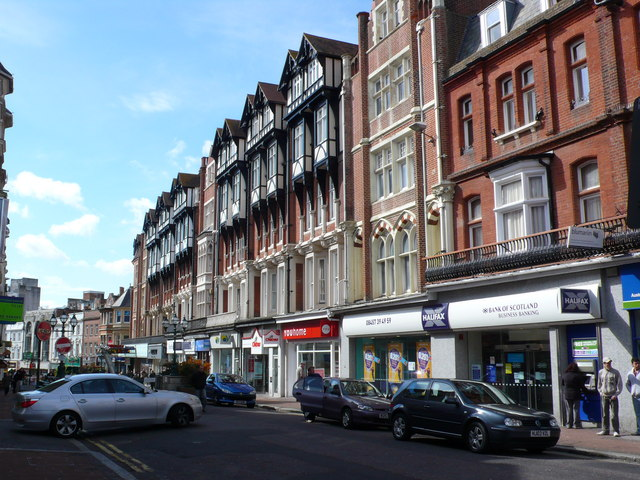
Shops and apartments in the centre of Bournemouth

The Lower, Central and Upper Gardens are Grade II* public parks, leading for several miles down the valley of the River Bourne through the centre of the town to the sea. Bournemouth has a further 425 acres (172 ha) of parkland. Initially serving to compensate for the loss of common rights after common land was enclosed in 1802, it was held in trust until 1889 when ownership passed to Bournemouth Corporation and the land became five public parks: King's Park, Queen's Park, Meyrick Park, Seafield Gardens and Redhill Common.

The detailed Land Use Survey by the Office for National Statistics in 2005 noted that the local authority area of Bournemouth had the third-highest proportion of land taken up by domestic gardens, 34.6%, of the 326 districts in England; narrowly less than the London Boroughs of Harrow and Sutton at the time, with 34.7% and 35.1%.

One of Bournemouth's most noted cultural institutions is Bournemouth Symphony Orchestra which was formed in 1893 under Dan Godfrey. It became the first municipal orchestra in the country when in 1896, Bournemouth Borough Council took control and Godfrey was appointed musical director and head of the town's entertainments. Originally playing three concerts a day during the summer season, in the great glass palm house known as the Winter Gardens; the orchestra is now based in Poole and performs around 130 concerts a year across Southern England.

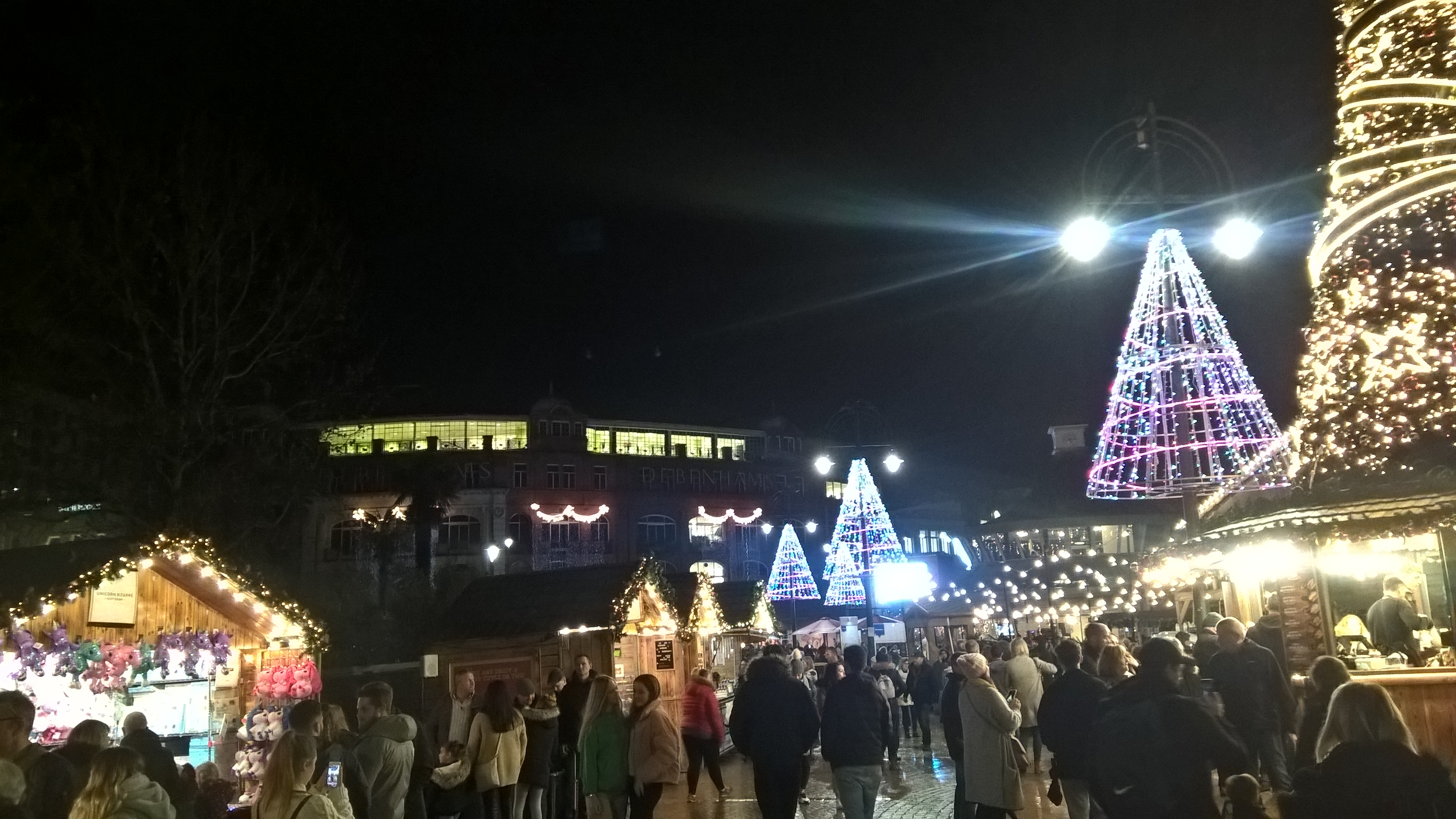
Bournemouth Christmas Market in 2019

Bournemouth is host to a number of festivals. Bournemouth Food and Drink Festival is a ten-day event which combines a market with live cookery demonstrations. The Arts by the Sea Festival is a mix of dance, film, theatre, literature, and music which was launched in 2012 by the local university, the Arts University Bournemouth, and is set to become an annual event. The Bourne Free carnival is held in the town each year during the summer. Initially a gay pride festival, it has become a celebration of diversity and inclusion.

Since 2008, Bournemouth has held its own air festival over four days in August. This has featured displays from the Red Arrows as well as appearances from the Yakovlevs, Blades, Team Guinot Wing-Walkers, Battle of Britain Memorial Flight including Lancaster, Hurricane, Spitfire and also the last flying Vulcan. The festival has also seen appearances from modern aircraft such as the Eurofighter Typhoon. The air festival attracts up to a million people over the four-day event. Bournemouth 7s Festival is a sports and music festival taking place in May each year. Hosting rugby, netball, hockey, dodgeball and volleyball tournaments, the event was launched in 2008.

Bournemouth was especially rich in literary associations during the late 19th century and earlier 20th century. P. C. Wren author of Beau Geste, Frederick E. Smith, writer of the 633 Squadron books, and Beatrice Webb, later Potter, all lived in the town. Paul Verlaine taught at a Bournemouth preparatory school and the writer J. R. R. Tolkien, spent 30 years taking holidays in Bournemouth, staying in the same room at the Hotel Miramar. He eventually retired to the area in the 1960s with his wife Edith, where they lived close to Branksome Chine. Tolkien died in September 1973 at his home in Bournemouth but was buried in Oxfordshire. The house was demolished in 2008.

Sir Percy Shelley, 3rd Baronet, lived at Boscombe Manor, a house he had built for his mother, Mary Shelley, the writer and author of the Gothic horror novel Frankenstein. Mary died before the house was completed but she was buried in Bournemouth, in accordance with her wishes. The family plot in St Peter's churchyard also contains her parents William Godwin and Mary Wollstonecraft, and the heart of her husband, Percy Bysshe Shelley.

Robert Louis Stevenson wrote The Strange Case of Dr. Jekyll and Mr. Hyde and most of his novel Kidnapped from his house "Skerryvore" on the west cliff, Westbourne. A novel of Stevenson's life while residing in Westbourne was written by Adelaide A. Boodle, who had met him there. Henry James, already acquainted with Stevenson through correspondence, and residing in Bournemouth in 1885 in large part because his invalid sister Alice lived there, visited Stevenson most evenings.

Vladimir Chertkov established a Tolstoyan publishing house with other Russian exiles at Tuckton, and under the 'Free Age Press' imprint, published the first edition of several works by Leo Tolstoy. In Roald Dahl's 1983 children's dark fantasy novel The Witches, the international conference of witches is set in a luxury hotel in Bournemouth. Author Bill Bryson worked for a time with the Bournemouth Echo newspaper and wrote about the town in his 1995 work Notes from a Small Island.

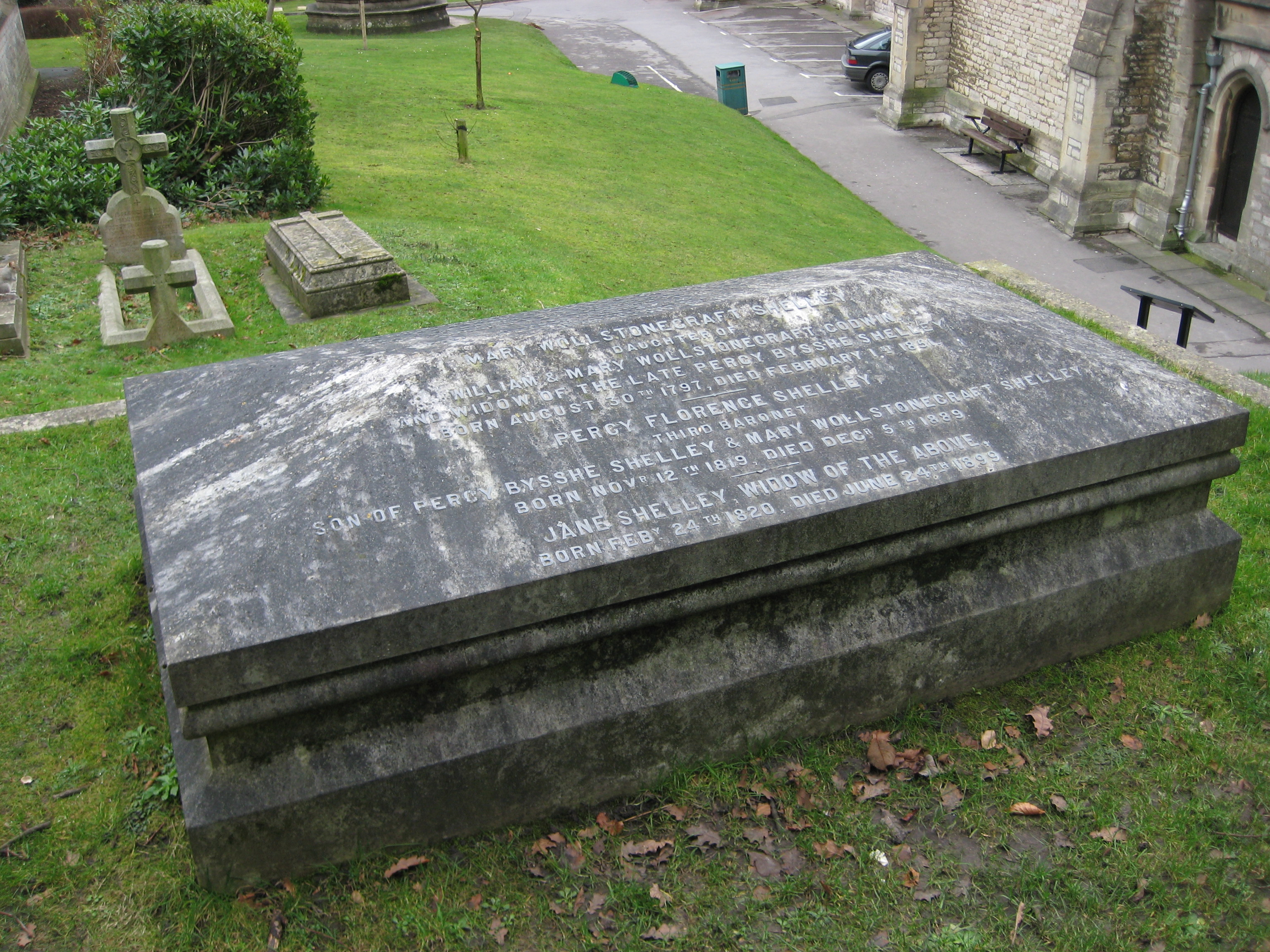
The grave of Mary Shelley and her parents, including Mary Wollstonecraft, in St. Peter's Church, Bournemouth

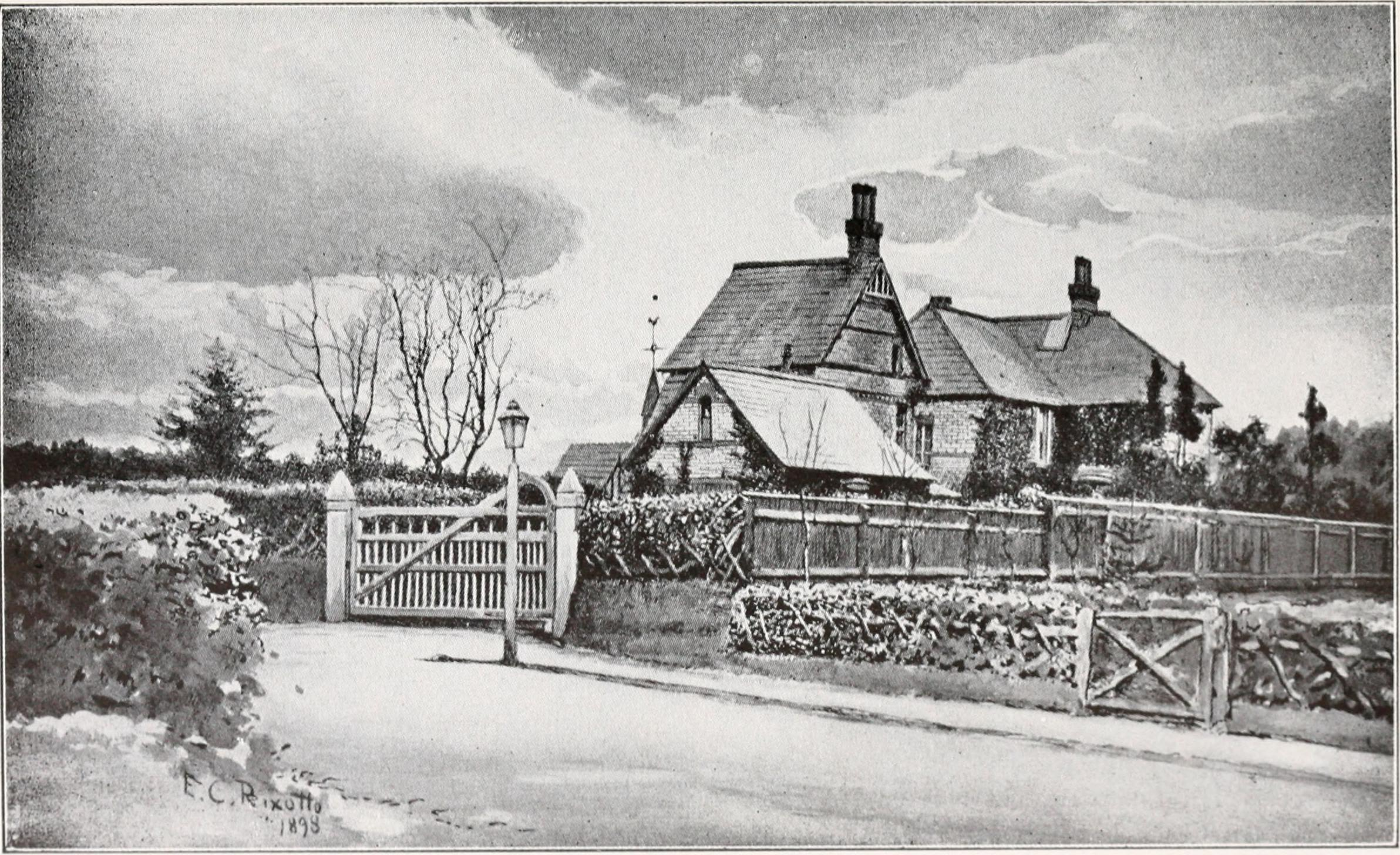
Robert Louis Stevenson's house Skerryvore in Westbourne

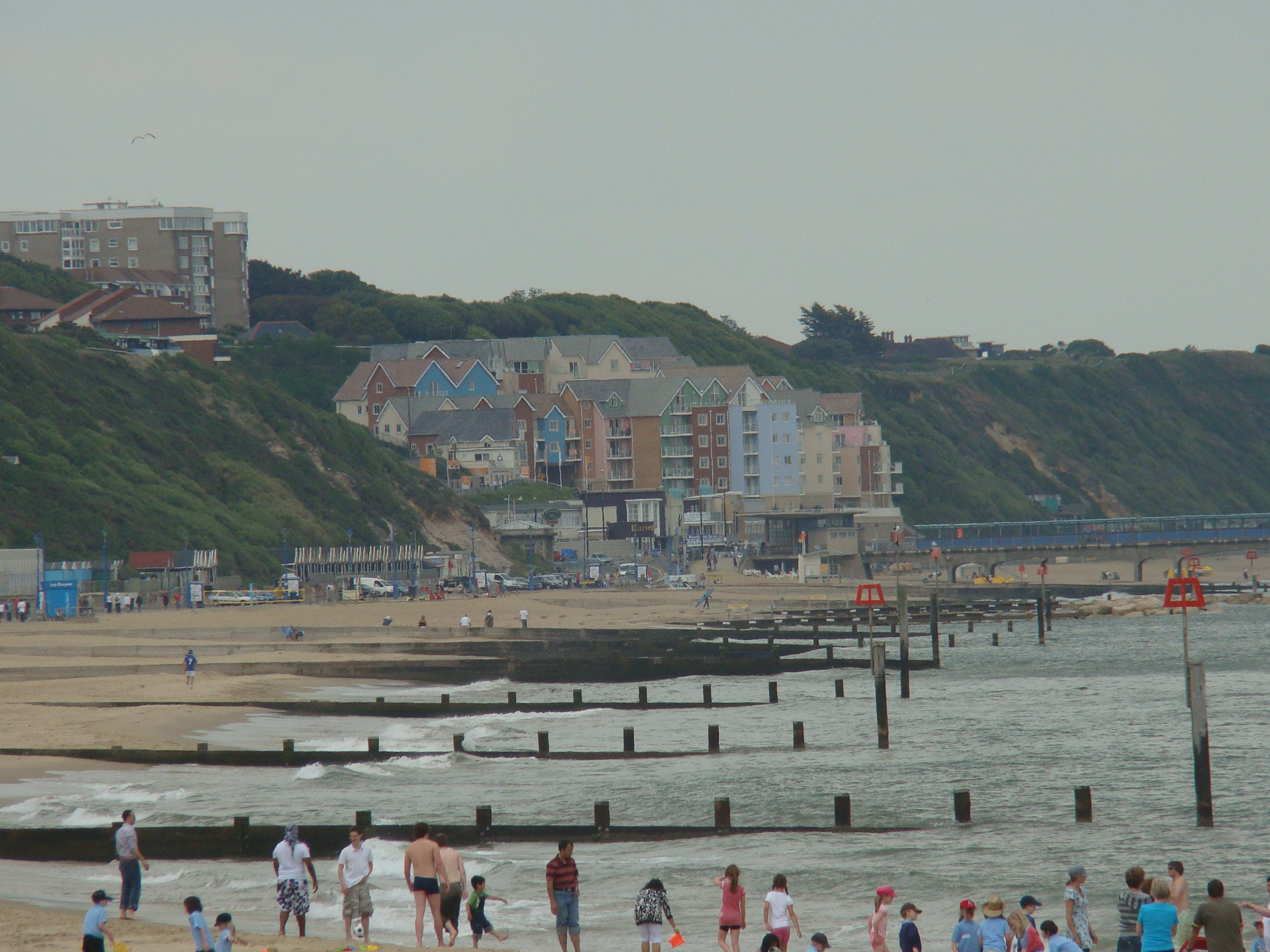
Colourful houses on Undercliff Drive

== Landmarks ==
Bournemouth has many historic landmarks, mainly dating from the Victorian and Edwardian era.

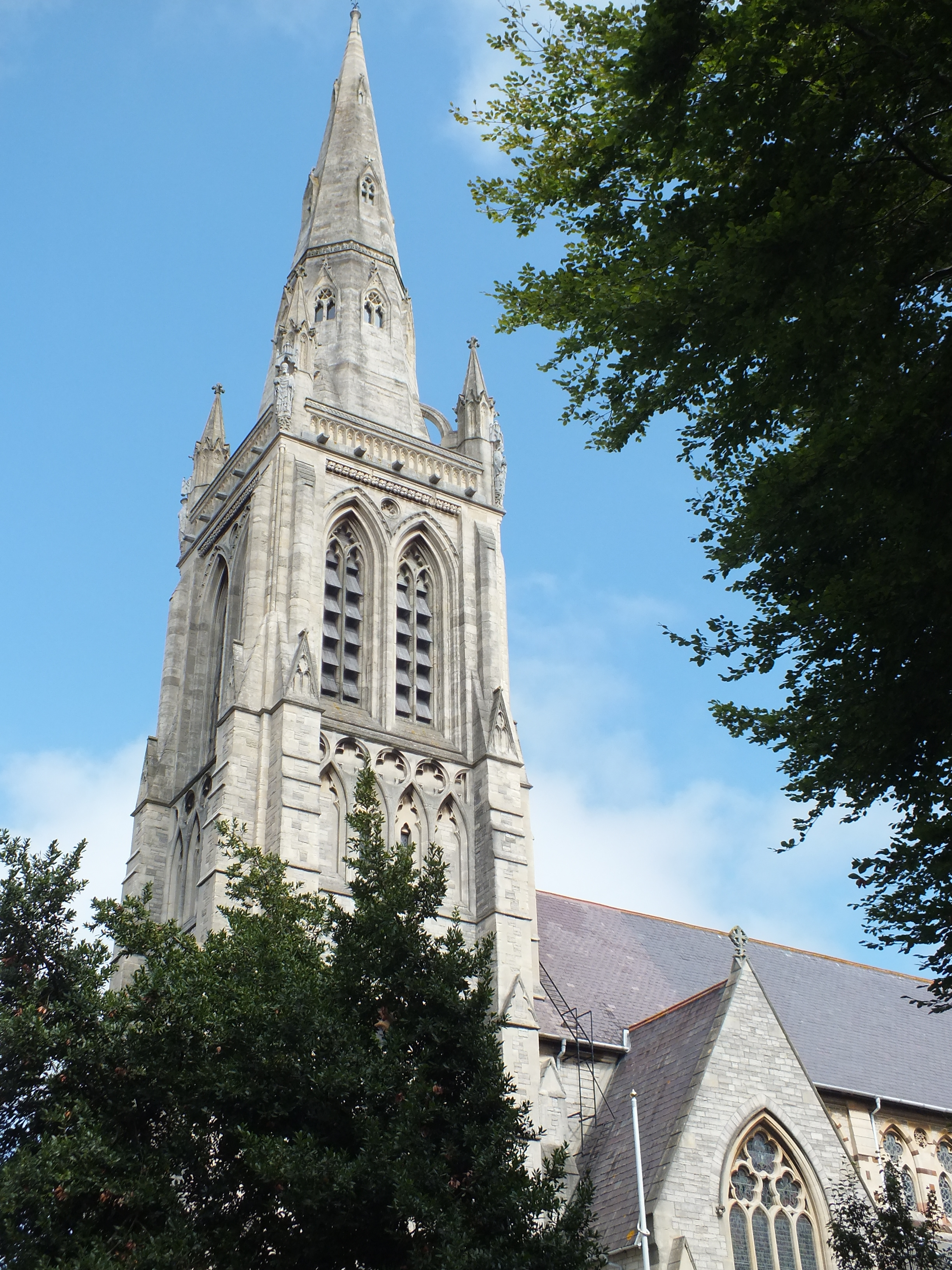
St Peter's Church, completed in 1879

Bournemouth has three grade I listed churches, St Peter's and St Stephen's in the town centre and St Clement's in Boscombe. St Peter's was the town's first church, completed in 1879 and designed by George Edmund Street. In his 1999 book, England's Thousand Best Churches, Simon Jenkins describes the chancel as "one of the richest Gothic Revival interiors in England". The 202 feet (62 m) spire dominates the surrounding skyline. When the architect, John Loughborough Pearson designed St Stephen's, his aim was to "bring people to their knees". It has a high stone groined roof, twin aisles and a triforium gallery, although the tower lacks a spire. Other listed churches include the Victorian St Mark's Church in the historic Talbot Village and the 12th-century St. Andrew's Church in Kinson.

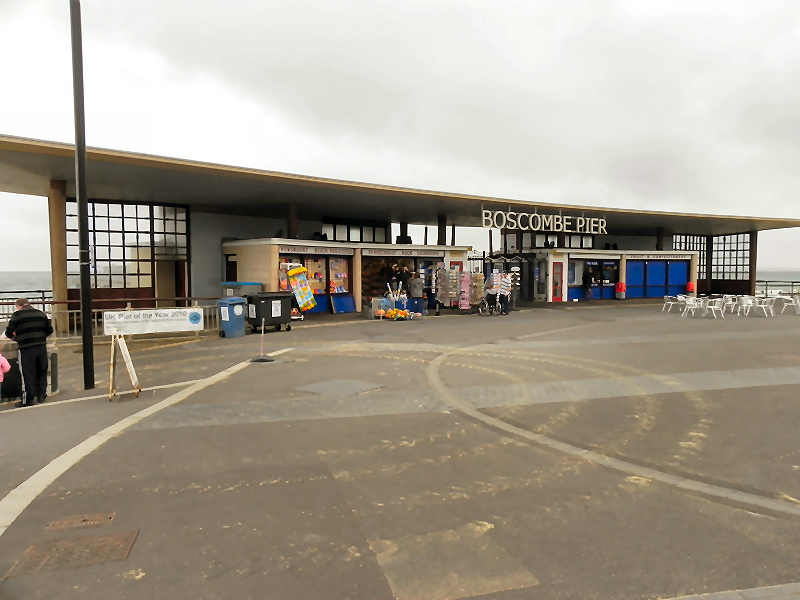
The grade II listed entrance to Boscombe Pier

The borough has two piers: Bournemouth Pier, close to the town centre, and the shorter but architecturally more important Boscombe Pier. Designed by the architect Archibald Smith, Boscombe Pier opened in 1889 as a 600 feet (180 m) structure. It was extended to 750 feet (230 m) in 1927 when a new head was constructed. Added in 1958, the boomerang-shaped entrance kiosk and overhanging concrete roof is now a grade II listed building. In 1961 a theatre was added. This was demolished in 2008 when the rest of the pier was renovated. In 2009, fashion designer Wayne Hemingway described Boscombe Pier as "Britain's coolest pier". It was voted Pier of the Year 2010 by the National Piers Society.

In 1856, Bournemouth Pier was a simple, wooden jetty. This was replaced by a longer, wooden pier five years later, and a cast-iron structure in 1880. Two extensions to the pier in 1894 and 1905, brought the total length to 305 metres (1,001 feet). After World War II, the structure was strengthened to allow for the addition of a theatre, constructed in 1960. This survived until the 2000s when it was turned into a climbing adventure centre. Between 1979 and 1981, a £1.7 million redevelopment programme, saw a great deal of reconstruction work, and the addition of a large two-storey, octagonal-shaped entrance building.

Built as the Mont Dore Hotel in 1881, Bournemouth Town Hall was designated a grade II listed building in 2001. Designed by Alfred Bedborough in the French, Italian and neo-classical styles, the foundation stone was laid by King Oscar II of Sweden and Norway and the hotel opened in 1885. The buff brick exterior features Bath stone dressings and terracotta friezes. The main entrance is sited within a projected façade that reaches to the eaves and is topped with a pediment, while above sits a belvedere with turrets and a pavilion roof. During the First World War the hotel was used as a hospital for British and Indian soldiers and after as a convalescent home. It never opened as a hotel again and was purchased by Bournemouth Borough Council in 1919. Other Victorian hotels in Bournemouth include the Royal Bath Hotel in the Town Centre and the Norfolk Royale Hotel in Richmond Hill.

Built in the Art Deco style in 1929, situated close to the seafront, the Pavilion Theatre was at the time said to be the biggest ever municipal enterprise for the benefit of entertainment. Built from brick and stone, the frontage features square Corinthian columns. Still a popular venue, it is today a grade II listed building.

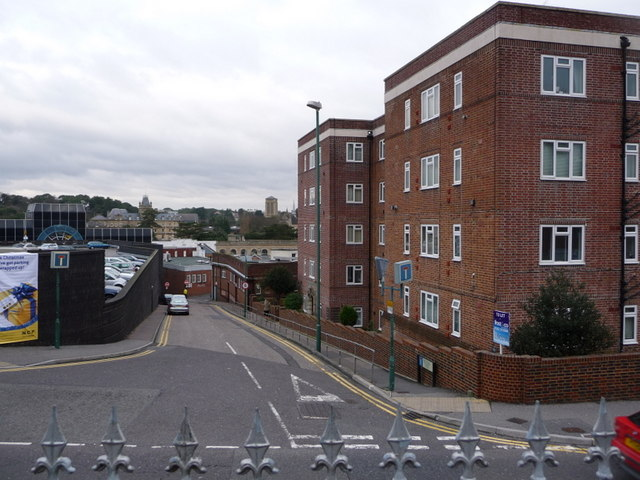
Orchard Street is the only Street in Bournemouth.

The Bournemouth Eye was a helium-filled balloon attached to a steel cable in the town's lower gardens. The spherical balloon was 69 metres (226 feet) in circumference and carried an enclosed, steel gondola. Rising to a height of 150 metres (490 feet), it provided a panoramic view of the surrounding area for up to 28 passengers. After the balloon suffered damage in 2016, the Bournemouth Borough Council, Lower Central Gardens Trust and S&D Leisure announced in 2017 that the contract for operating the Bournemouth Eye would not be renewed due to "increased operating costs."

Bournemouth is known for having only one "street". This is Orchard Street, now a small alley between Commercial Road and Terrace Road. Originally named because it led to an orchard, it pre-dates the build up of the modern town. The 19th century developers thought that names such as road, avenue and drive would be more suitable names, with street associated with poorer areas of existing towns and cities.

== Sport ==
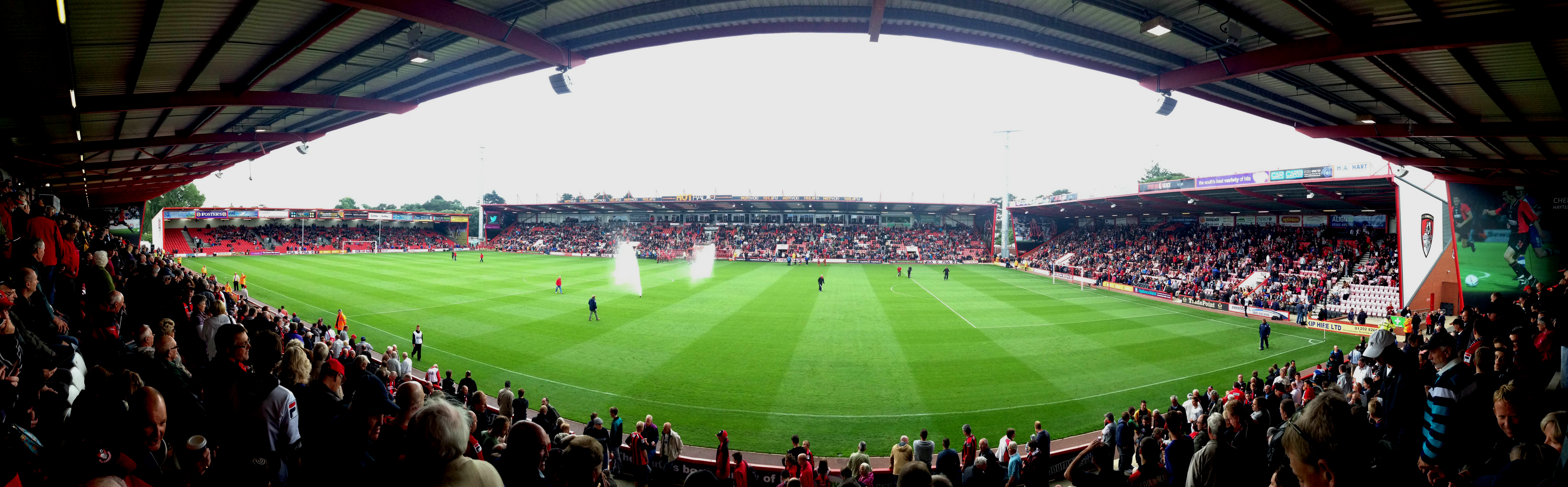
AFC Bournemouth's Dean Court stadium

The town has a professional football club, AFC Bournemouth, which plays in the Premier League. Known as the Cherries, they play at Dean Court stadium near Boscombe in Kings Park, 2 miles (3 km) east of the town centre.

Bournemouth Rugby Club, which competes in the National League Division Two South, has its home at Bournemouth Sports Club; it is sited next to Bournemouth Airport. It hosts an annual Bournemouth 7s Festival, the world's largest sport and music festival, combining Rugby sevens, netball, hockey, dodgeball and crossfit tournaments with festival entertainment. Oakmeadians RFC is the oldest RFU accredited rugby club in Bournemouth, established in 1963. They train and play at Meyrick Park, competing in the South West Division.

Bournemouth Cricket Club also plays at Bournemouth Sports Club and is reported to be one of the biggest cricket clubs in the country. Its first team plays in the Southern Premier League. Dean Park is a former county cricket ground, once home to Hampshire County Cricket Club and later Dorset County Cricket Club. Today it is a venue for university cricket.

The BIC has become a venue for a round of the Premier League Darts Championship, organised by the Professional Darts Corporation.

The Bournemouth Rowing Club is the town's coastal rowing club. Established in 1865, as Westover and Bournemouth Rowing Club, it is reported to be the oldest sporting association in the county. The club regularly competes in regattas organised by the Hants and Dorset Amateur Rowing Association, which take place on the south coast of England between May and September.

Other watersports popular in Poole Bay include sailing and surfing; there are a number of local schools for the beginner to learn either sport. Bournemouth has the third largest community of surfers in the UK and, in 2009, an artificial surf reef, one of only four in the world, was constructed there. The reef failed to deliver the promised grade 5 wave, suffered a series of delays and ran over budget, finally costing £3.2 million.

The town is home to Bournemouth and Southampton Octopush Club, otherwise known as underwater hockey. They train at Ringwood Leisure Centre, as well as Totton Health and Leisure Centre in Southampton. In the 2023 Nautilus Tournament, Bournemouth and Southampton OC finished 7th (out of 7) in Division 2.

== Transport ==
=== Railway ===
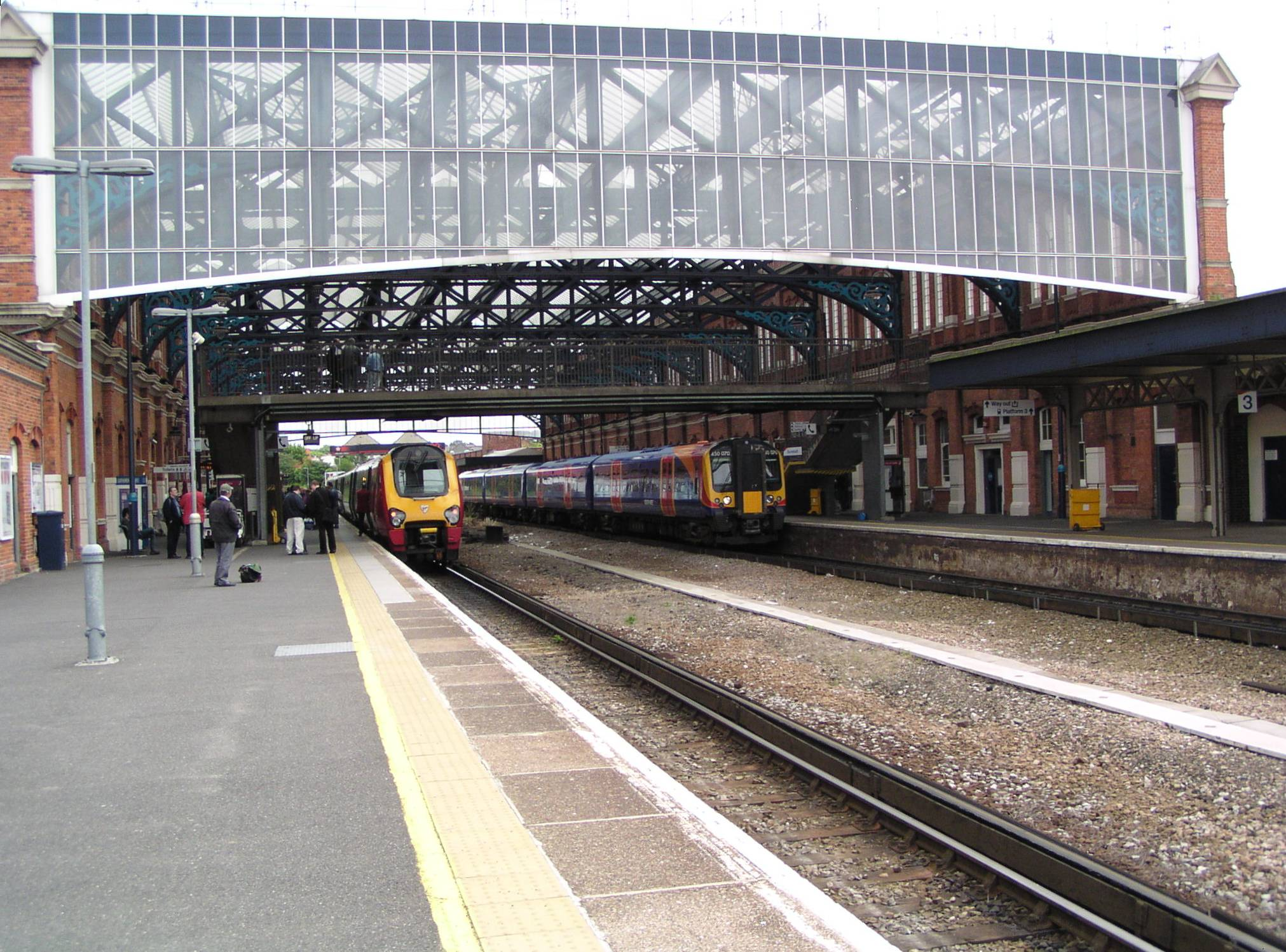
Bournemouth railway station, built in 1885, with a reglazed Victorian iron and glass roof

Bournemouth is the main railway station that serves the town. Pokesdown also serves its eastern suburbs and Branksome the west. All three stations lie on the South West Main Line between Weymouth and London Waterloo.

South Western Railway operates two mainline trains per hour serving Weymouth, Southampton Central, Winchester, Woking, and London Waterloo.

CrossCountry operates intercity trains with an hourly service operating to Manchester Piccadilly serving Reading, Oxford, Birmingham New Street, Macclesfield & Stockport.

Before its closure in 1966, Bournemouth was also served by the Somerset & Dorset Joint Railway, which provided direct access to Somerset and the Midlands.

=== Road ===
The principal route to the town centre is the A338 spur road, a dual carriageway that connects to the A31 close to the Hampshire border. The A31 joins the M27 at Cadnam and, from there, the M3 to London and the A34 to the Midlands and the North can be accessed.

The main road west is the A35 to Honiton in Devon which runs through the South East Dorset Conurbation and continues east as far as Southampton, albeit as a non-primary route. The A350 in the neighbouring borough of Poole provides the only northern route out of the conurbation.

=== Buses and coaches ===
Bus services are operated by Morebus, who run all local services around the town and to Christchurch, Lymington, New Milton, Poole and Ringwood.

Yellow Buses ceased operating in August 2022. It was the former Bournemouth Council-owned company and successor to Bournemouth Corporation Transport which began operating trams in 1902.

National Express coaches serve Bournemouth Travel Interchange and Bournemouth University. There are frequent departures to London, Gatwick Airport, Poole and Weymouth.

=== Air ===
Originally an RAF airfield, Bournemouth Airport was transferred to the Civil Aviation Authority in 1944 and was the UK's only intercontinental airport before the opening of Heathrow Airport in 1946. Acquired by the Manchester Airports Group in 2001, the airport underwent a £45 million phased expansion programme between 2007 and 2011.

Situated near the village of Hurn in Christchurch, Dorset, the airport is 4.5 miles (7.2 km) from Bournemouth town centre and serves around 600,000 passengers annually. There are direct flights to 23 international destinations in nine countries: Cyprus, Finland, Greece (3 destinations), Italy (4), Malta, Portugal, Spain (10), Switzerland and Turkey.

== Education ==
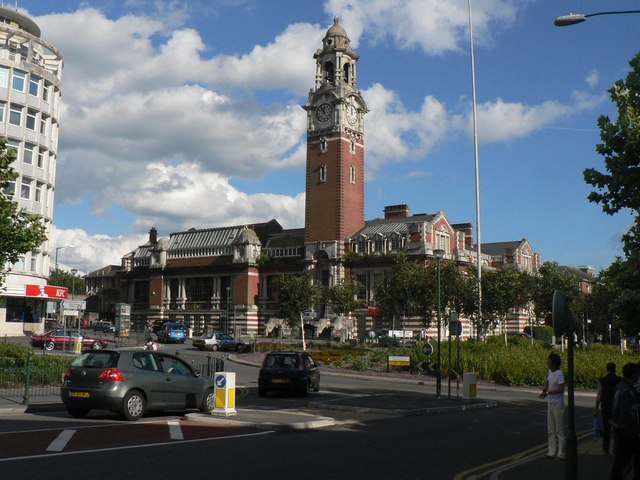
Bournemouth and Poole College Lansdowne Campus

The Bournemouth local education authority was first set up in 1903 and remained in existence until local government was reorganised in 1974 when Bournemouth lost its County Borough status and became part of the county of Dorset. Under the later reforms of 1997, Bournemouth became a unitary authority and the Bournemouth local education authority was re-established.

The local council operates a traditional two-tier system whereby pupils attend one of the 26 primary schools in the borough before completing their education at secondary school. Bournemouth is one of the minority of local authorities in England still to maintain selective education, with two grammar schools (one for boys, one for girls) and ten secondary modern/non-selective schools. There are a small number of independent schools in the town.

Bournemouth and Poole College offers further education, higher education and community courses. Bournemouth has two universities: Bournemouth University and Arts University Bournemouth, both of which are across the boundary in neighbouring Poole. They are home to AECC University College formally known as Anglo European College of Chiropractic, which is on Parkwood Road in Bournemouth.

In 2012, 60.7% of the borough's school leavers gained 5 GCSEs of grade C or above. This was slightly better than the national average of 59.4% and above the average for the rest of Dorset, with 58.8% of pupils from the local authority of Poole, and 54.1% from the remainder of the county, managing to do likewise.

== Religion ==
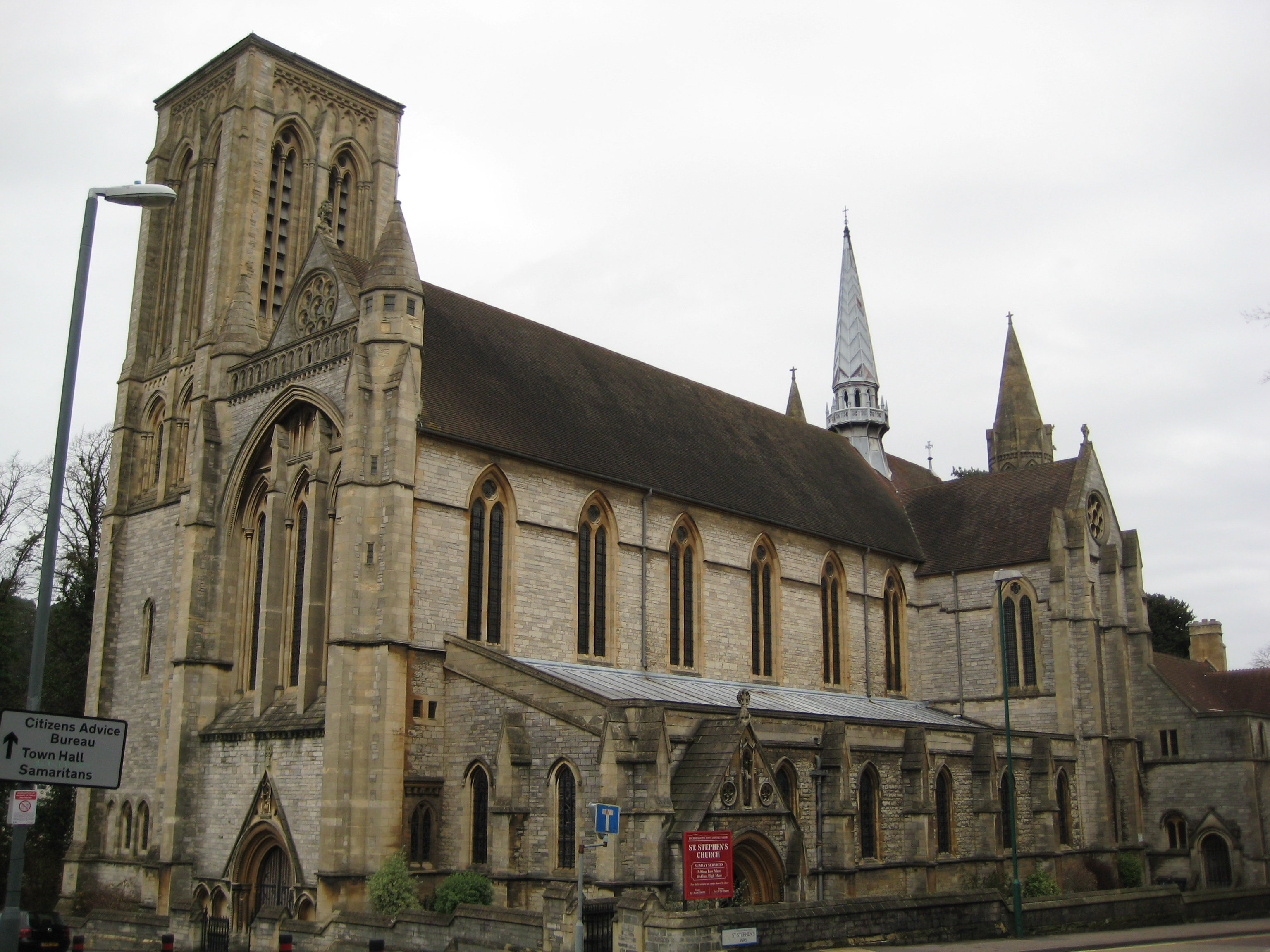
St Stephen's Church, Bournemouth, built in 1898

The 2011 census revealed that 57.1% of the borough's population are Christian. With all other religions combined only totalling 4.7%, Christianity is by far the largest religious group. 40% of the borough falls within the Church of England Diocese of Salisbury. The remainder, to the east, belongs to the Diocese of Winchester. The Roman Catholic Diocese of Portsmouth incorporates most of Bournemouth with the exception of two small parishes to the west which are covered by the Diocese of Plymouth.

The borough has several notable examples of Victorian church architecture including the previously mentioned St. Peter's, the churchyard of which contains the grave of the author Mary Shelley; St Stephen's Church, completed in 1898 for services under the influence of the Oxford Movement and St Clement's, one of the first churches to be designed by John Dando Sedding, built in Boscombe in 1871.

To serve a rapidly expanding population a third church was built in the town centre in 1891. St Augustin's Church was commissioned by Henry Twells who was 'priest-in-charge' there until 1900. The largest church in the town is the Richmond Hill St Andrew's Church, part of the United Reformed Church. Built in 1865 and enlarged in 1891, it has a seating capacity of 1,100 and is unusually ornate for a non-conformist church.

Holy Trinity Church was built, at 161, Old Christchurch Road, in 1868-9 in Italian Romanesque style, designed by Cory & Ferguson of Carlisle. A tower was added in 1878. It was deconsecrated in 1973, and burnt down in 1979. The site now has a modern office building named "Trinity".

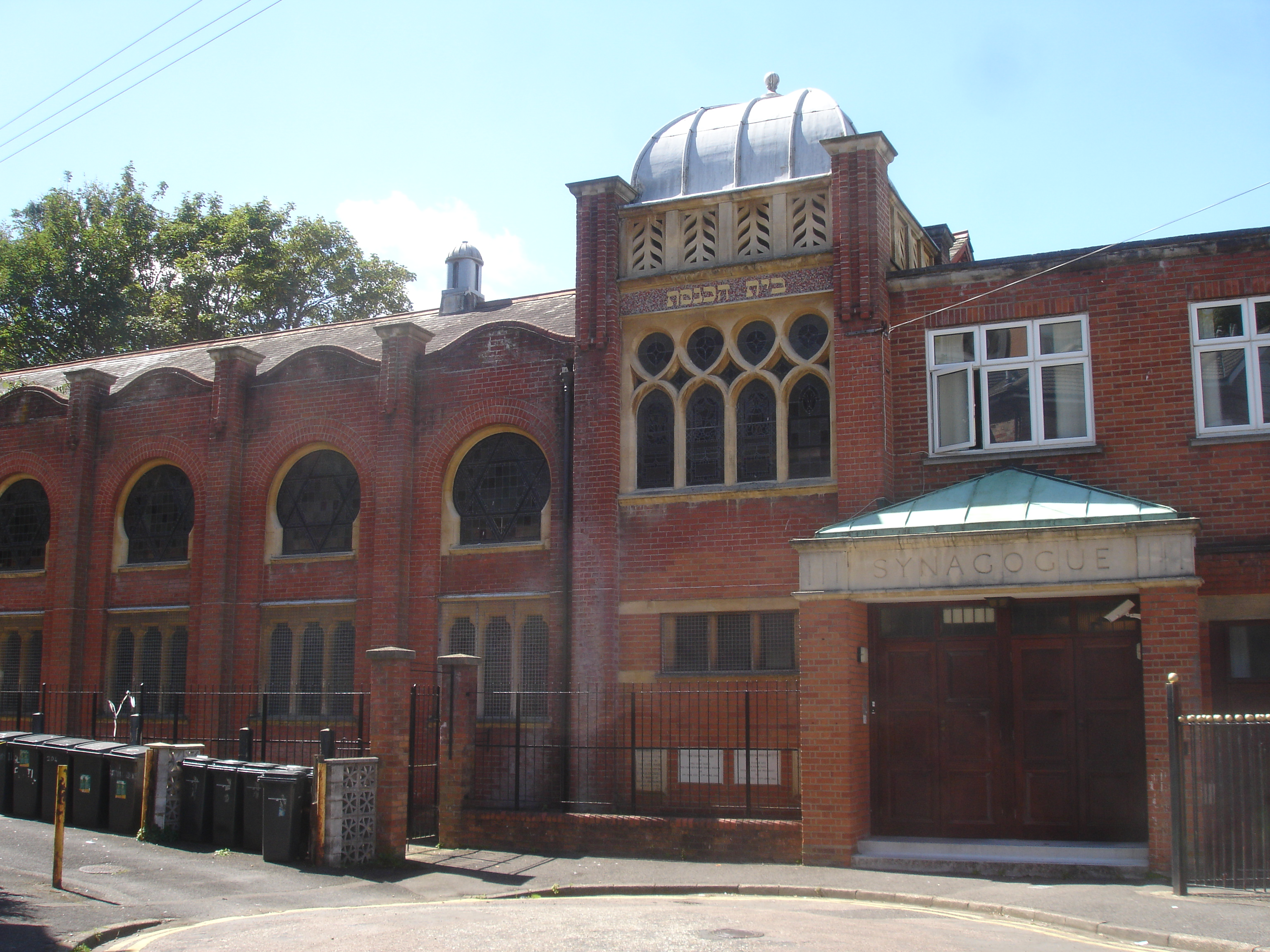
The Bournemouth Hebrew Congregation

Few purpose-built places of worship exist in the borough for faiths other than Christianity, although with a higher proportion of Jewish residents than the national average, there are three synagogues. Chabad-Lubavitch of Bournemouth is a branch of the worldwide movement. The Bournemouth Reform Synagogue, formerly known as Bournemouth New Synagogue, is a Reform Jewish synagogue with over 700 members. The architecturally notable Bournemouth Hebrew Congregation synagogue was built in 1911 with an Art Nouveau take on the Moorish Revival style. There are two Christadelphian meeting halls in the town.

The Bournemouth Islamic Centre and Central Mosque provides information, support and a place of worship for the Islamic community.

== Naming conventions ==
The word 'Bournemouth' is often used loosely to describe the South East Dorset conurbation, which also contains the neighbouring towns of Poole, Christchurch, Wimborne Minster, and Verwood. As a result, "Bournemouth" is used in the following terms:

- Although it has a significant presence in Bournemouth town centre, Bournemouth University's main campus is in Poole, on the boundary with Bournemouth.
- Bournemouth Airport is near Hurn in the borough of Christchurch, and was originally named RAF Hurn.
- "Bournemouth Bay" is sometimes used for Poole Bay.
- The Bournemouth Symphony Orchestra is based in Poole.

== Notable people ==
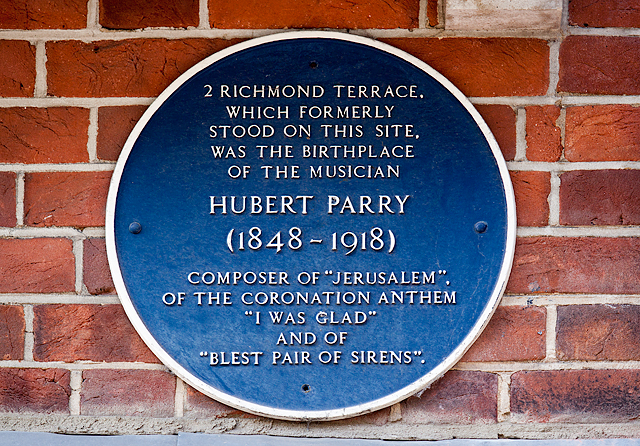
A blue plaque marking the birthplace of Hubert Parry at 2, Richmond Terrace, Bournemouth

Many famous people have come from Bournemouth. Tony Hancock lived for most of his early life in hotels in Bournemouth run by his parents.

A number of actors came from Bournemouth, including Juliette Kaplan from the BBC comedy Last of the Summer Wine; Ray Lonnen from the series The Sandbaggers (1978–80); Alison Newman, actress who played Hazel Bailey in Footballers' Wives and DI Samantha Keeble in EastEnders; Jack Donnelly (born 1985), actor, who played the role of Jason in the BBC series Atlantis; Sophie Rundle (born 1988), actress, portrayed Ada Shelby in the BBC One series Peaky Blinders and Ben Hardy (born 1991), actor, who played Peter Beale in EastEnders. Renowned actors Christian Bale and Millie Bobby Brown both lived in Bournemouth for parts of their childhood. The film actor Stewart Granger lived in Bournemouth, with his home being marked by a blue plaque.

Women's rights and temperance campaigner Emily Langton Massingberd (1847–1897) built and sometime lived in the Red House, now the Langtry Manor Hotel in Bournemouth. Authors Radclyffe Hall (1880–1943) poet and author, who wrote The Well of Loneliness a groundbreaking work in lesbian literature came from Bournemouth, and Dilys Powell (1901–1995) journalist, film critic of The Sunday Times for over fifty years, went to school there. Primatologist and anthropologist Jane Goodall (1934-2025) lived in later life in Bournemouth.

Patrick Ensor (1946–2007), editor of The Guardian Weekly from 1993 to 2007, also came from Bournemouth.

Bournemouth has been home to a number of musicians, including Andy Summers, the guitarist from the globally acclaimed band, The Police, who was born in 1942, and spent his formative years in Bournemouth. Summers discovered his passion for music there and honed his skills on the guitar playing with local bands. His musical journey led him to The Police, where his intricate guitar work became iconic. Summers later enjoyed a successful solo career, blending rock, jazz, and world music in his solo albums. Collaborations with fellow Bournemouth native Robert Fripp showcased his virtuosity and artistic prowess that also spans other artistic disciplines – film composing, writing, film making, and photography. Max Bygraves (1922–2012) comedian, singer, actor and variety performer, also lived in Bournemouth.

The composer Sir Hubert Parry (1848–1918) was born in Bournemouth. One of Britain's most prolific composers of choral music, he is probably best known for his setting to William Blake's words of "Jerusalem". Alex James, best known as the bassist of the rock band Blur, attended Bournemouth School before moving to London. The rock band King Crimson included many musicians from Bournemouth, including brothers Michael Giles (drums) and Peter Giles (bass).

Bournemouth has been the home of sporting world champions: Freddie Mills (1919–1965), who won the World Light Heavyweight title in 1948. Another famous sportsman, the athlete Charles Bennett (1870–1948), lived in the town after he retired. Bennett was the first British track and field athlete to become Olympic Champion, winning two gold medals and a silver at the Paris Games in 1900. The tennis player and Wimbledon Championships winner Virginia Wade was born in Bournemouth. Colonel Edmond Cotter, a runner-up player for the Royal Engineers team in the inaugural 1872 FA Cup Final, and later in life an Irish Republican, died in Bournemouth in 1934.

Three recipients of the Victoria Cross (VC) came from Bournemouth. Frederick Charles Riggs (1888–1918), Cecil Noble (1891–1915), and Lieutenant Colonel Derek Anthony Seagrim (1903–1943), Five recipients of the VC died in Bournemouth - General Sir Reginald Hart (1848–1931), Royal Navy Staff-Surgeon William Job Maillard (1863–1903), Second-Lieutenant Alfred Oliver Pollard (1893–1960), Joseph John Davies (1889–1976) and James Welch (1889–1978).

A distinguished resident of Bournemouth was Sir Donald Coleman Bailey, (1901–1985) a civil engineer who invented the Bailey bridge. Bailey was knighted in 1946 for his bridge design when he was living in Southbourne in Bournemouth.

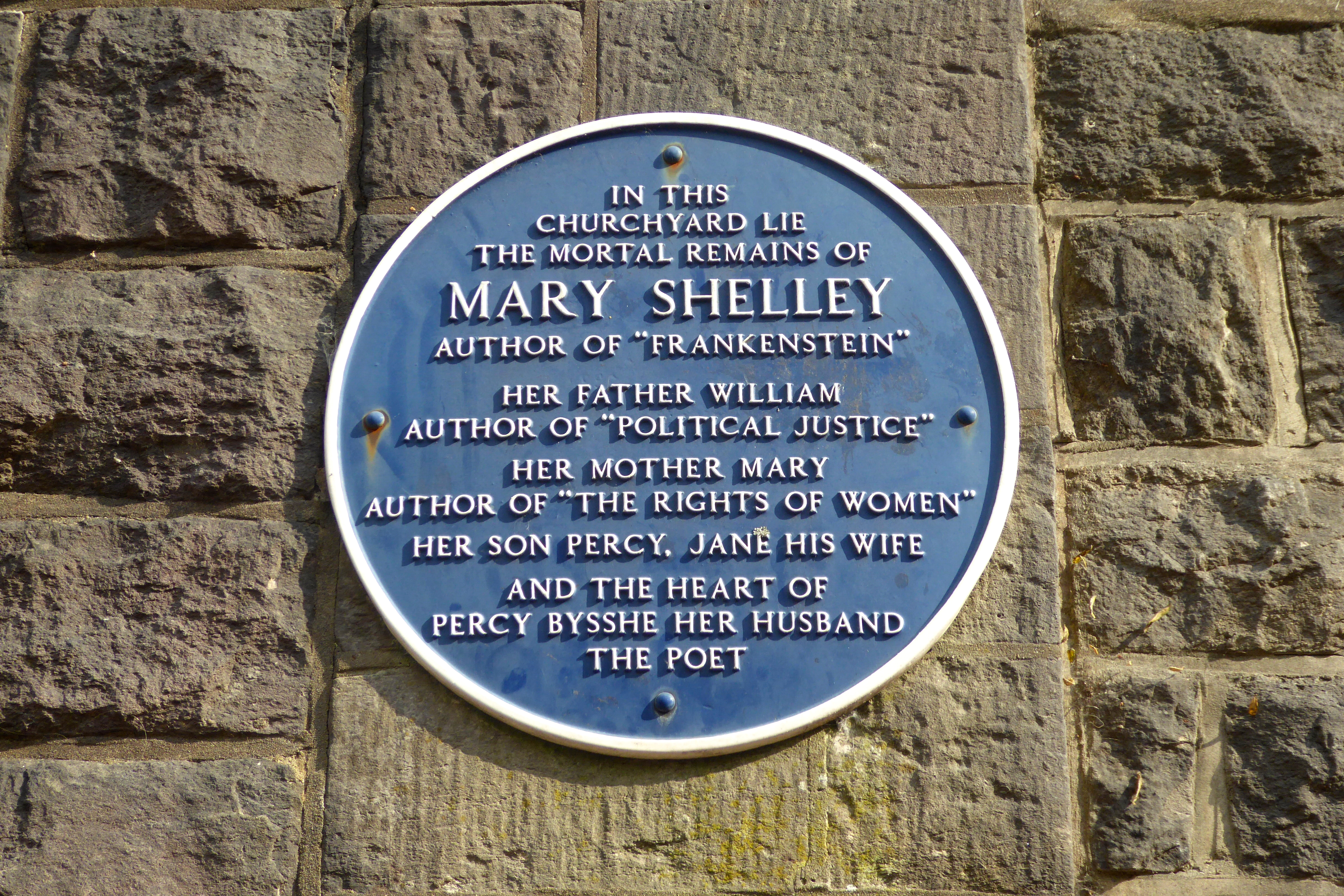
A blue plaque on the Wall of St Peter's Churchyard commemorating the resting place of members of the Shelley family

The heart of Percy Bysshe Shelley, together with Mary Shelley and her mother Mary Wollstonecraft and father William Godwin, are all buried at St Peter's Church, Bournemouth. Percy's and Mary's son, Sir Percy Shelley, 3rd Baronet, lived at Boscombe Manor, now the Shelley Manor Medical Centre, and is also buried in the same vault at St Peter's.

== Twin towns ==
Bournemouth is twinned with:

- Netanya, Israel
- Lucerne, Switzerland

== Freedom of the Borough ==
The following people and military units have received the Freedom of the Borough of Bournemouth.

=== Individuals ===
- Frederick Roberts, 1st Earl Roberts: 22 October 1902
- Sir Winston Churchill
- Sir Geoffrey Hurst
- Sir Christopher Hoy
- Bob Geldof
- Eddie Howe: 5 March 2019

=== Military Units ===
- The Royal Hampshire Regiment: 13 September 1945
- HMS Phoebe (F42): 8 May 1989

== See also ==
- List of beaches in the United Kingdom
- Coastline of the United Kingdom

== Bibliography ==
- Andrews, Ian; Henson, Frank (2004). Images of England – Bournemouth. Stroud, Glos: Tempus Publishing Ltd. ISBN 0-7524-3065-3.
- Ashley, Harry W.; Ashley, Hugh (1990). Bournemouth 1890–1990 (a brief history of Bournemouth over the last 100 years). Bournemouth: Bournemouth Borough Council.
- Cave, Paul (1986). A History of the Resort of Bournemouth. Southampton: Paul Cave Publications Ltd. ISBN 0-86146-039-1.
- Edwards, Elizabeth (1981). A History of Bournemouth. Chichester: Phillimore & Co Ltd. ISBN 0-85033-412-8.
- Emery, Andrew (2008). A History of Bournemouth Seafront. Stroud, Glos: Tempus Publishing Ltd. ISBN 978-0-7524-4717-9.
- Rawlings, Keith (2005). Just Bournemouth. Wimborne: Dovecote Press. ISBN 1-904349-39-0.
