= Bournemouth 7s Festival =

Sport and music festival in England

Bournemouth 7s Festival is a sport and music festival, and takes place over three days across the Spring Bank Holiday Weekend on the South Coast of England. Since being founded in 2008 by Dodge Woodall and Fleur Woodall, it has grown to see over 30,000 participants.

== Festival ==
Bournemouth 7s Festival takes place at Bournemouth University Sports Campus in Christchurch, just east of Bournemouth. It is situated on a 65-acre site, which houses the main festival arena, the sports pitches, the campsite and glamping. It was created by Dodge and Fleur Woodall, who still privately own the event today. Dodge Woodall was introduced to the events industry while at Loughborough University, where he created two student nightclub brands and held 1,500 events over a 10-year period. In 2007 there were fewer festivals taking place in the UK, and having identified a market for a multi-sports and music event, Woodall saw the opportunity to use his skill set to launch a festival. The launch of Bournemouth 7s Festival saw 96 sports teams compete and 8,000 general admission tickets were bought on the day, at the gates.

Each year over 400 teams come together for their sports tour and compete across a large variety of elite and social sports tournaments. The festival currently has five sports: rugby, netball, dodgeball, hockey, and CrossFit. Volleyball and ultimate Frisbee were added in 2018.

CrossFit, hosted by the National Fitness Games, is now the festival's fifth sport, having been introduced in 2021.

The 65-acre festival site accommodates each of the sports, with a total of eight rugby pitches, 12 netball courts, two hockey pitches, two dodgeball arenas, and one CrossFit arena.

== History ==
Bournemouth 7s first took place in May 2008 with 8,000 people attending and 96 rugby teams competing. It quickly became known for being an end of season rugby tour. The festival was extended from 2 days to 3 days. Attendance grew to 20,000 and 300 teams competed. After the success of the taster netball sessions in 2008, netball tournaments became a permanent fixture. In 2011, Nintendo became the first headline sponsor.

Dodgeball was introduced as the festivals third sport in 2013, followed closely by the addition of hockey in 2014 which brought the total number of teams competing to 360. The number of festival goers reached 25,000 and 2016 saw Bournemouth 7s’ first headline performance by Fatman Scoop.

The festival reached its capacity of 30,000 people on its 10th anniversary. In 2018, volleyball and ultimate frisbee were introduced, two new arenas were established and Example headlined on the Saturday. A further two arenas, Funky Forest and Ya Mum's House, were added in 2019 to take the total to 12. The Saturday was headlined by Professor Green.

The festival 2020 was cancelled due to the ongoing COVID-19 pandemic. The 2021 festival was scheduled to take place on the usual May Bank Holiday weekend, but had to be moved to the August Bank Holiday weekend due to COVID-19 restrictions. In August 2022, the 14th edition saw CrossFit make its debut as well as Bingo Lingo. Records were broken for the number of attendees and the number of teams competing, of which there were over 400. Ella Eyre headlined on the Saturday.
