= Bournemouth Community Hebrew Congregation =

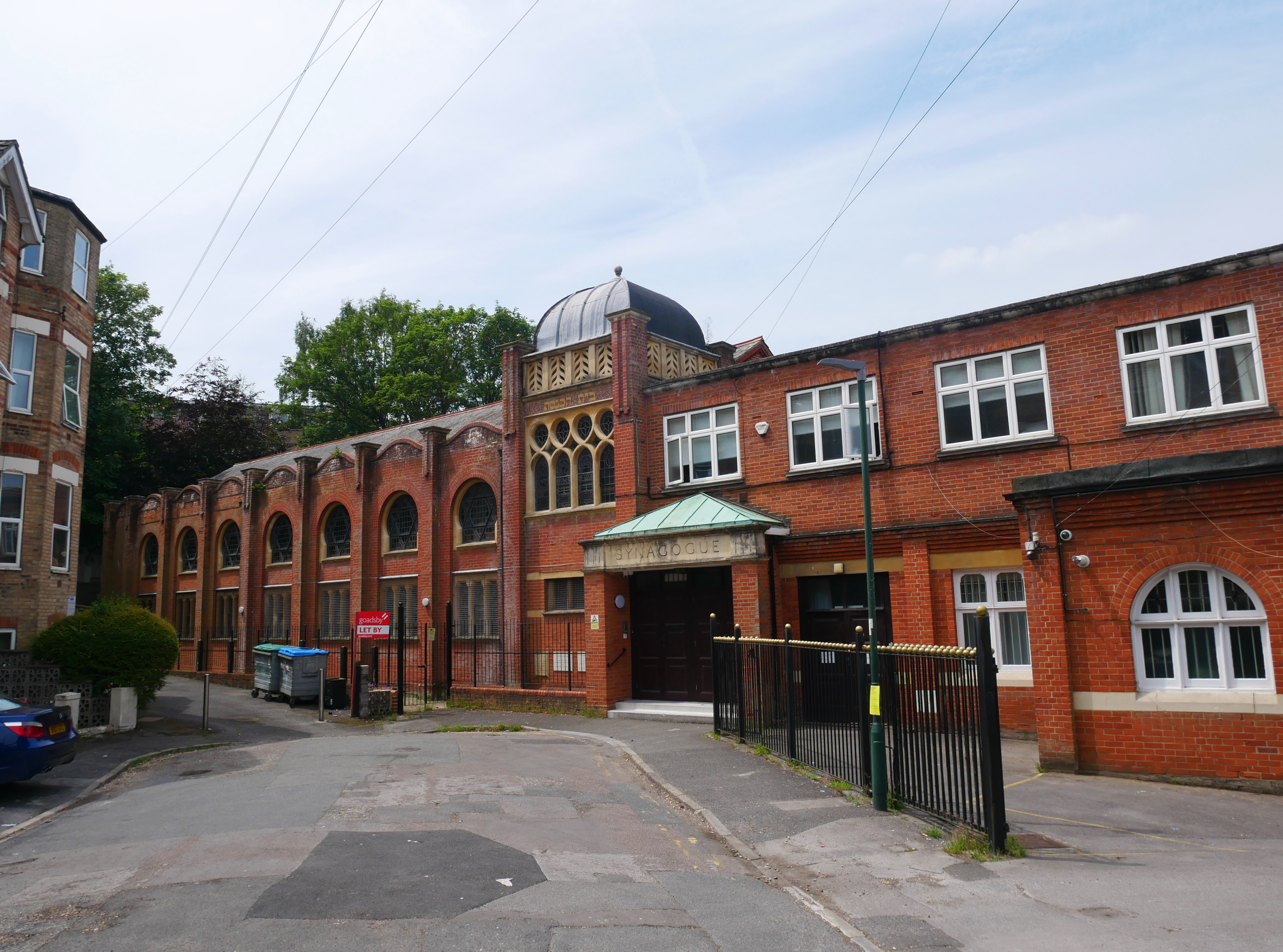
- The east façade of the synagogue in 2021

- Location of the synagogue in Dorset

Religion
- Affiliation: Orthodox Judaism
- Rite: Nusach Ashkenaz
- Ecclesiastical or organizational status: Synagogue
- Leadership: Rabbi Adrian Jesner
- Status: Active

Location
- Location: Wootton Gardens, Lansdowne, Bournemouth, Dorset, England BH1 1PW
- Country: United Kingdom
- Interactive map of Bournemouth Community Hebrew Congregation
- Coordinates: 50°43′16″N 1°52′16″W

Architecture
- Type: Synagogue architecture
- Style: Art Nouveau; Moorish Revival
- Established: 1905 (as a congregation)
- Completed: 1911

Website
- bhcshul.co.uk

Listed Building – Grade II
- Official name: The Shul, Bournemouth Hebrew Congregation Synagogue
- Type: Listed building
- Designated: 30 January 2019
- Reference no.: 1452943

The Bournemouth Community Hebrew Congregation is an Orthodox Jewish congregation and synagogue, located in Wootton Gardens, Lansdowne, Bournemouth, Dorset, England, in the United Kingdom. The congregation was formed in 1905 and worships in the Ashkenazi rite. The rabbi of the congregation is Adrian Jesner.

== History ==
The congregation was formed in 1905. Albert Samuel, brother of Liberal politician Herbert Samuel, laid the cornerstone of the current synagogue, which was built in 1911.

The synagogue was listed as a Grade II building in 2019.

In February 2023 it was reported that the current synagogue building will be sold in order to move to smaller premises.

== Architecture ==
The curvilinear roof line and window shape reveal what would have been a very contemporary Art Nouveau take on the Moorish Revival style that was extremely popular for synagogues. The squat tower with its square dome and "attractive interlocking window arcade" mark the original entrance. The horseshoe-arched windows to the left are also part of the original facade.

The new entrance, to the right of the tower, and barrel-vaulted interior with a ladies' gallery is the result of a 1957–62 expansion. The Torah Ark, also dating from the 1960s, is a mosaic design by craftsmen from Florence intended to echo the Temple of Solomon by featuring the Biblical columns Boaz and Jachin.

== See also ==
- History of the Jews in England
- List of Jewish communities in the United Kingdom
- List of synagogues in the United Kingdom
