= Escor Toys =

British Toy Manufacturer

Escor Toys was a British toy manufacturer, based in Bournemouth, Dorset, England, best known for its brightly painted wooden toys manufactured by people with disabilities.

== History ==
Escor Toys was formed in 1938 to manufacture wooden children's toys. Edward Seaton Corner of Bransgore, Dorset, visited the British Industries Fair in 1936 and was struck by the lack of British-made toys. He ‘felt there must be a market for something original’ and in 1937 exhibited the wooden toys he had been making in the garage at his home, under the name ESCOR, taken from his own name E.S. Cor(ner). The buyer for Hamleys, London was taken by what he had made and gave him his first order. Toy making was suspended during World War II, when the factory made wooden pieces for trainer aeroplanes. By 1947, Escor was based at Purewell, Christchurch. Corner's nephew, Edward Corner, and later Edward's son, William joined the business. In 1972 ownership of Escor Toys Ltd. passed to Mark, the Earl of Ronaldshay, who already owned and ran three toy shops in the U.K. The Corners remained as directors. Peter Thorne became managing director of Escor by 1974, and in 1985, when the Earl of Ronaldshay ceased his involvement, Thorne took on responsibility for all aspects of the business. In the late 1980s, Thorne went into partnership with Bournemouth Borough Council. Escor began to provide work for people with disabilities, and gained Department for Work and Pensions accreditation. In the mid 1990s, the council took on full ownership, and it was merged with Dorset Enterprises, known for its deck chairs. It closed when Bournemouth council ceased funding for the business in 2013.

== Products ==
Escor Toys produced brightly painted wooden toys, often with a transport or fairground theme. Their pullalong toys were recommended by experts in the importance of play in child development not only for their bright finish, but also because of the educational advantage of their three play functions (pullalong, fitting and representational), important at different stages of development. They were also recommended for disabled children, for grasping and fitting practice and for imaginative games. The rowing boat with movable figures has been used for hearing tests by hospitals and health authorities across the UK since the 1980s. By the 2000s, Escor Toys was using FSC-certified wood.

- Cars
- Rowing Boat
- Merry-go-round / Carousel
- Charabanc
- Roundabout
- Maypole
- Swings

== Awards ==
- 2005 - Practical Pre-School Awards, Bronze for the Merry-Go-Round
- November 2006 - voted ‘Best Buy’ in the Ethical Consumer Buyers Guide to Toys.
