= Coat of arms of Bournemouth =

Coat of Arms of Bournemouth
- Armiger: Bournemouth Borough Council (1891-2019), Charter Trustees of Bournemouth (2019-)
- Adopted: 1891
- Crest: On a Wreath of the Colours upon a Mount Vert a Pine Tree proper in front four Roses fessewise Or
- Shield: Quarterly Or and Azure a Cross flory between a Lion rampant holding between the paws a Rose in the first and fourth quarters six Martlets two two and two in the second and four Salmons naiant and in pale in the third all counterchanged
- Motto: "Pulchritudo et Salubritas" (Latin) "Beauty and Health"

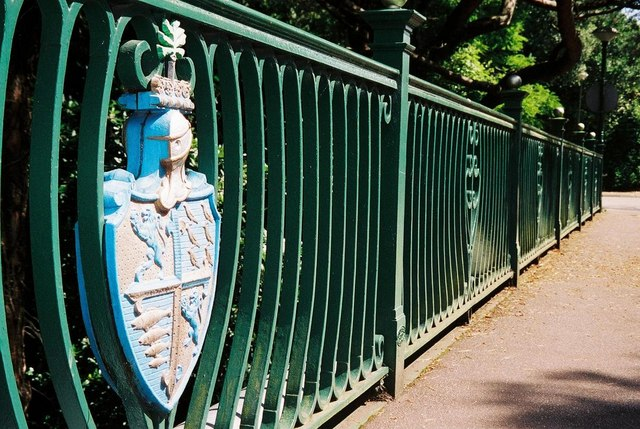
The arms on the Middle Chine Bridge.

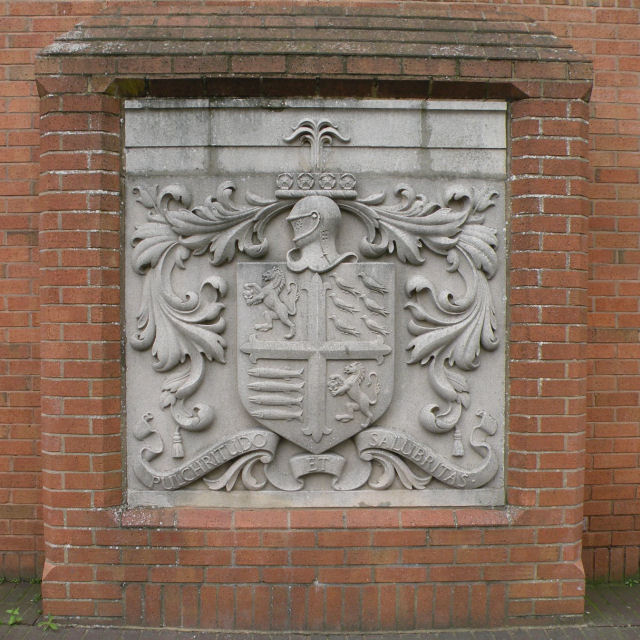
Bournemouth Arms on the Car Park of the Bournemouth International Centre, contemplating which the words Pulchritudo (Beauty) and Salubritas (Wholesomeness).

The coat of arms of Bournemouth was first granted on 24 March 1891. The crest (above the shield) consists of four English roses surmounted by a pine tree. The motto (below the shield) is Pulchritudo et Salubritas, Latin for "beauty and health". The colours of the shield, the main part of the coat of arms, are taken from the royal arms of King Edward the Confessor, in whose royal estate the area now known as Bournemouth was situated. The four salmon represent those to be found in the River Stour, which marks the boundary between Christchurch and Bournemouth. Each of the lions holds a rose between its paws. The six birds, also taken from Edward the Confessor's arms, are martlets, heraldic birds with no legs (based on the folk belief that swallows never stopped flying and so did not need legs). The roses in the arms are emblems both of England and of Hampshire, which Bournemouth historically belonged to.
