= List of churches in Bournemouth =

The following is a list of churches in Bournemouth, a coastal resort town on the south coast of England.

== Active ==
Name	Civil parish (settlement)	Image	Dedication	Web	Founded	Denomination	Architecture	Notes
Bournemouth Community Church	Moordown				2011		Art Deco	
Bournemouth First Church of Christ Scientist	East Cliff		Church of Christ, Scientist		1926	The First Church of Christ, Scientist		
Bournemouth Spiritualist Church	Town Centre		N/A		20th century	Spiritualist church		
Breath of Life Church (St Mary's Church)	Springbourne		Mary		1926-34	Non-denominational		Grade II listed, deconsecrated circa 2003, returned to being used as a church in 2018
Chapel of the Resurrection (now Bournemouth Unitarian Church)	Town Centre		N/A		1925–26	Unitarian		Churchyard of St Peter's
Christ Church	Westbourne		Jesus		1913	Evangelical		
Church of All Saints	Southbourne		All Saints		1913-14	Anglican		Grade II listed
Church of the Annunciation	Charminster		Annunciation		1905-6	Catholic		Grade II* listed
Church of Our Lady of Victories and St Bernadette, Bournemouth	Ensbury Park							
Church of St Thomas More, Iford	Iford							
Cornerstone Church	West Howe		N/A		1956	Baptist		
Corpus Christi Church	Boscombe		Body of Christ		1895	Catholic		Grade II listed
East Cliff Church	East Cliff		N/A		1879	United Reform		Grade II listed
Elim Church	Springbourne		N/A		1909	Evangelical		
Elim Church	Winton, Dorset		N/A			Evangelical		
Holy Epiphany Church	Muscliff		Epiphany		20th century	Anglican		
Howeth Road Evangelical Church	Ensbury Park		N/A		20th century	Evangelical		
Immanuel Church	Southbourne		Francis Immanuel		1930	United Reformed Church		
Liberal Catholic Church of St. Raphael	Lansdowne		Saint Raphael the Archangel		20th century	Liberal Catholic Church		
Moordown Baptist Church	Moordown				20th century	Baptists		
Moordown, Church of the Nazarene	Moordown		Church of the Nazarene		20th century	Evangelical		
New Life Christian Fellowship Church	Northbourne		N/A		20th century	New Life Christian Fellowship		
Richmond Park Church (former Salvation Army Citadel)	Richmond Park		N/A		Late 1800s	Evangelical		
Rosebery Park Baptist Church	Pokesdown		N/A		1891	Baptist		
Sacred Heart Church	Richmond Hill		N/A		1874	Catholic	English Gothic	Grade II listed
Strouden Park Chapel	Strouden Park		N/A		1950s	Non-denominational	Brutalist	
St Alban's Church	Charminster		Alban		1907-09	Anglican		Grade II listed
St Andrew's Church	Boscombe		Andrew		1907-08	Anglican		Grade II listed
St Andrew's Church (Bennett Road)	Malmesbury Park		Andrew		1891-1900	Anglican		Grade II listed
St Andrew's Church	Kinson		Andrew		13th century	Anglican	Middle Ages	Grade II* listed
St. Andrew's Church	Richmond Hill		Andrew		1891	United Reformed Church		Grade II listed
St Augustin's Church	Charminster		Augustin		1891-92	Anglican	English Gothic	Grade II listed
St Barnabas' Church, Bournemouth	Strouden Park		Barnabas		20th century	Anglican	Postmodern	
St Christopher's Church, Southbourne	Southbourne		Christopher				English Gothic	
St Clement's Church	Boscombe		Clement		1871-73	Anglican	English Gothic	Grade I listed
St Edmund Campion Church	Strouden Park		Edmund Campion		20th century	Catholic	Mid-century modern	The only original building that survived the construction of the Castlepoint Shopping Centre in 2003
St Francis of Assisi's Church, Bournemouth	Charminster		Francis of Assisi		1930	Anglican	Romanesque Revival	Grade II listed
St James's Church, Pokesdown	Pokesdown		James		1858	Anglican	English Gothic	Grade II listed
St John the Baptist's Church, Moordown	Moordown		St John the Baptist		1874	Anglican	English Gothic	Grade II listed
St John the Evangelist's Church, Boscombe	Boscombe		John the Evangelist		1893-95	Anglican	English Gothic	Grade II* listed
St Katharine's Church, Southbourne	Southbourne		Katherine		1881-82; 1899-1900	Anglican	English Gothic	Grade II listed
St Luke's Church, Winton	Winton		Luke		1898	Anglican	English Gothic	Grade II listed
St Mark's Church, Bournemouth	Talbot Village		Mark		1870	Anglican	English Gothic	Grade II listed
St Michael's Church, Bournemouth	Town Centre		Michael		1875-76	Anglican	English Gothic	Grade II* listed
St Nicholas' Church, Southbourne	Southbourne		Nicholas			Anglican	Modern	
St Peter's Church, Bournemouth	Town Centre		Peter		1879	Anglican	Gothic Revival	Grade I listed
St Saviour's Church, Iford	Iford		Jesus as Saviour		1936	Anglican	Romanesque Revival	
St Stephen's Church, Bournemouth	Town Centre		Stephen		1881	Anglican	Gothic Revival	Grade II listed
St Ambrose Church, Westbourne	Westbourne		Ambrose		1898	Anglican	Gothic Revival	Grade II* listed
St Swithun's Church, Bournemouth	East Cliff		Swithun		1876	Anglican	Gothic Revival	Grade II listed
St Thomas's Church, Bournemouth	Ensbury Park		Thomas		20th century	Anglican	Modern	
Turning Point Church and Bournemouth Deaf Centre	Pokesdown		N/A		1995	Gospel		Deconsecrated in 1995 but still used for Christian worship
Victoria Park Methodist Church	Victoria Park		N/A		20th century	Methodism		
Winton, Christadelphian Church	Winton					Christadelphians		
Winton Baptist Church	Winton					Baptists		
Winton, Church of Christ the Saviour	Winton							
Winton Methodist Church	Winton					Methodism		
Winton, Bournemouth Community Church Centre	Winton							
Winton, United Reformed Church	Winton					United Reformed Church		
West Cliff Baptist Church	Westbourne		N/A		1879	Baptist	English Gothic	Grade II listed

== Former ==
Name	Civil parish (settlement)	Image	Dedication	Built	Closed	Denomination	Architecture	Notes
Bournemouth Central Christadelphian Church	Town Centre			20th century	~2013	Christadelphians		Demolished and replaced with student housing
Bournemouth Unitarian Church	Town Centre		N/A	20th-century	21st-century	Unitarian	English Gothic	Grade II listed; used as offices
East Howe Methodist Church	East Howe		N/A	20th-century	2013	Methodist	Vernacular	Demolished and replaced with a Co-op
Ensbury Park Methodist Church	Ensbury Park		N/A	1926	2008	Methodist	English Gothic	Demolished and replaced with flats
Lansdowne Baptist Church	Lansdowne		N/A	1892	2015	Baptist	English Gothic	Demolished and rebuilt.
Moordown Congregational Church	Moordown		N/A	1860	2002	Non-denominational	English Gothic	Disused
Mount Zion Baptist Chapel	Town Centre		N/A	20th-century	2007	Baptist	English Gothic	Demolished
Pokesdown United Reformed Church	Pokesdown		N/A	1820	2001	United Reformed Church	Regency architecture	Converted into flats.
Punshon Memorial Methodist Church, Exeter Road	Town Centre		N/A	1958	2008	Methodist	Brutalist	Demolished pending redevelopment
Saint Andrews, Exeter Road	Town Centre		St Andrew	19th-century			English Gothic	Pending redevelopment
St John's Mission Church	Moordown		St John	1853	21st-century		English Gothic	Redeveloped into commercial and later residential use
Wallisdown Road Methodist Church	Wallisdown		N/A	20th-century	2009	Methodist	Brutalist	Used as a pre-school nursery
