= St Luke's Church, Winton =

Church in Bournemouth, Dorset, England

St Luke's Church
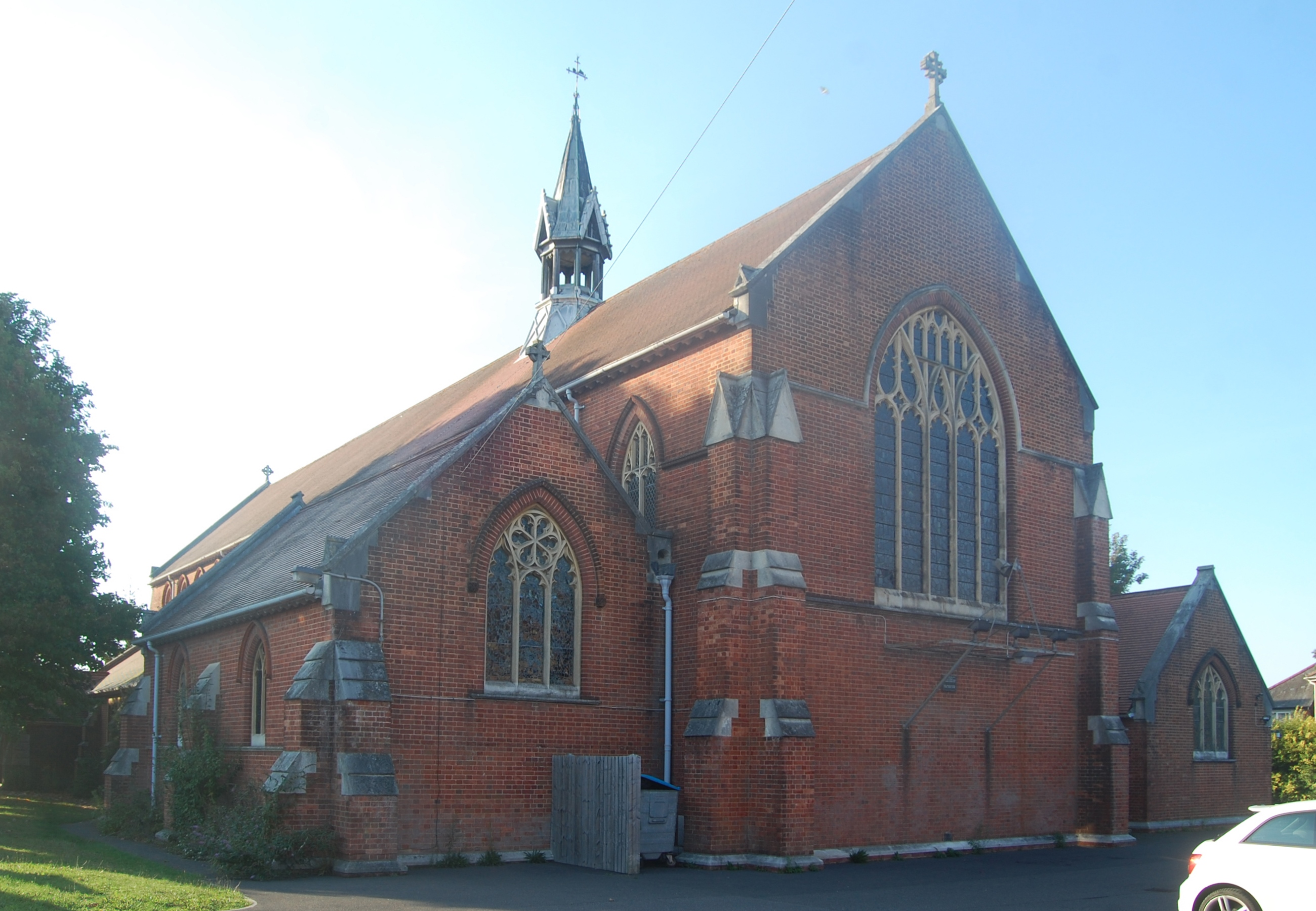
- St Luke's Church in 2022

Religion
- Affiliation: Anglicanism
- Ecclesiastical or organizational status: active

Location
- Location: St. Luke's Road, Winton, Bournemouth, Dorset, England
- Interactive map of St Luke's Church
- Coordinates: 50.733353°N 1.848899°W

Architecture
- Architect: Christopher Crabb Creeke
- Type: Church
- Style: English Gothic architecture
- Completed: 1897-1898

St Luke's Church is a Grade II listed church in the Winton area of Bournemouth. St Luke's Church is part of the Parish of Four Saints along with St John the Baptist, St Francis of Assisi and St Alban's Church.

== History ==
The church was constructed from 1897 to 1898 by Creeke, Gifford and Oakley. The church is constructed using red brick with limestone dressing. The stained glass window is a work of Walter E Tower.

== See also ==
- List of churches in Bournemouth
- List of Anglican churches
