= Moordown air disaster =

1944 bomber crash in England

Coordinates: 50.7565°N 1.8730°W

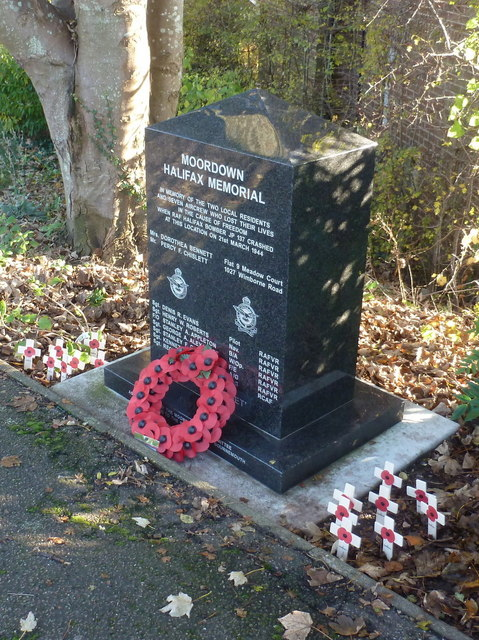
- The Halifax Memorial at Moordown.

Accident
- Date: 21 March 1944
- Summary: Mechanical failure
- Site: Moordown, Bournemouth, England

Aircraft
- Aircraft type: Handley Page Halifax
- Aircraft name: Halifax JP137
- Operator: Royal Air Force
- Flight origin: Hurn Airport
- Destination: Morocco
- Occupants: 7
- Crew: 7
- Fatalities: 9
- Survivors: 0

On 21 March 1944, a Royal Air Force Handley Page Halifax bomber crashed in Moordown, Bournemouth, Hampshire (now Dorset) soon after take-off from RAF Hurn (now known as Bournemouth Airport) killing nine people.

== Crash ==
The Halifax, serial number JP137, was dispatched from No 3 Overseas Aircraft Dispatch Unit at Hurn at 00:33 hours bound for Morocco on transfer to the Mediterranean Allied Air Forces in the Second World War. Flying westerly, the plane turned into a wide arc, presumably in an attempt to return to Hurn, it flew over East Howe towards Wallisdown turning south over Talbot Woods and due east over Winton when it descended towards Moordown. The plane clipped buildings, including a Victorian chapel and the tram depot. The plane crashed in a residential area at the corner of Wimborne Road and Meadow Court Close. With a full fuel tank the plane burst into flames. There were no survivors on board. Two civilians were also killed in their homes.

== Casualties ==
The plane crash resulted in nine fatalities:

From the RAF Volunteer Reserve

- Pilot Sergeant Denis Evans, 20, of Middlesex
- Navigator Sgt Henry Roberts, 35, of Gloucestershire
- Bomb Aimer Flying Officer Stanley Appleton, 30, of Wembley
- Wireless Operator Sgt George Alexander, 23, of Bedford
- Flight Engineer Sgt Stanley Gent, 22, of Portslade
- Air Gunner Sgt Kenneth Green, 20, of Kingston upon Hull

In the Royal Canadian Air Force

- Air Gunner Sgt Reginald McGregor, 21, of New Westminster, Canada

Civilians

- Dorothea Bennett, 59, of Flat 9 Meadow Court, Wimborne Road
- Percy Chislett, 49, of 1027 Wimborne Road

== Legacy ==
Despite eyewitnesses reporting engine failure, official reports into the crash squarely blamed the 20-year-old pilot Denis Evans. However it is now believed that a known design issue with the Halifax was the main cause. In 2010, Moordown councillor Sue Anderson advocated a permanent memorial as part of Bournemouth's bicentennial. In 2011, a memorial was unveiled to commemorate the air crash. The 70th anniversary was marked at the memorial. In 2024, the 80th anniversary was marked. There is a website dedicated to the Moordown Halifax Memorial which can be accessed here: https://www.jp137.com
