= Old St John's Buildings =

Building in Bournemouth, Dorset, England

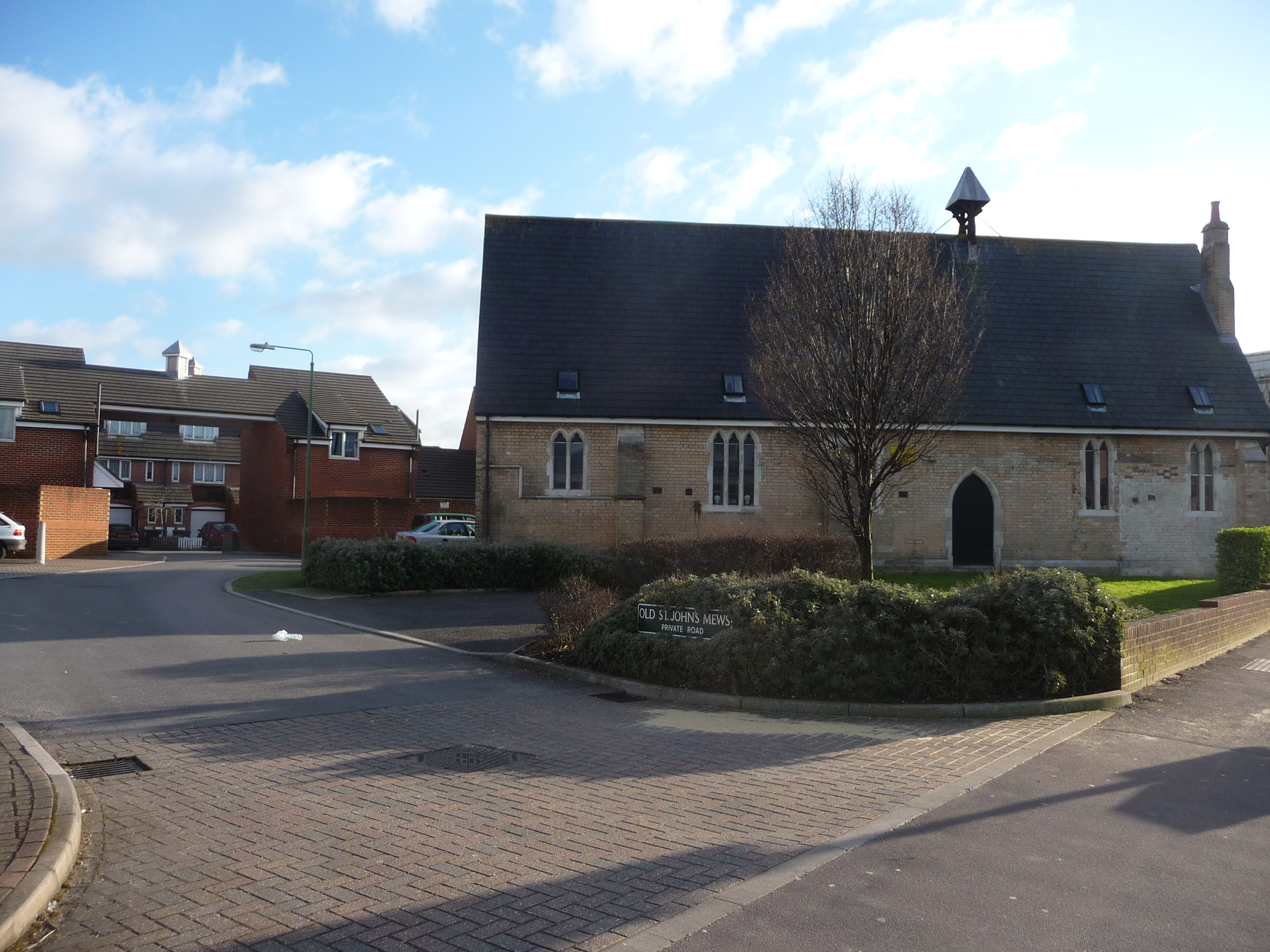
- Old St John's Buildings in 2010

Religion
- Affiliation: Anglican

Location
- Location: Bournemouth, Dorset, England
- Interactive map of Old St John's Buildings
- Coordinates: 50.75477°N 1.87460°W

Architecture
- Architect: GE Street
- Type: Church
- Style: Gothic Revival architecture
- Completed: 1853

Old St John's Buildings, formerly known as St John's Mission Church, is a historic building in the Moordown area of Bournemouth, England.

== History ==
The church was designed by GE Street and was completed in 1853. It was later replaced by the larger St John the Baptist's Church.

It was used as a school and as commercial premises for many years before being converted for residential use. The building became Grade II listed in 1976.

== Gallery ==
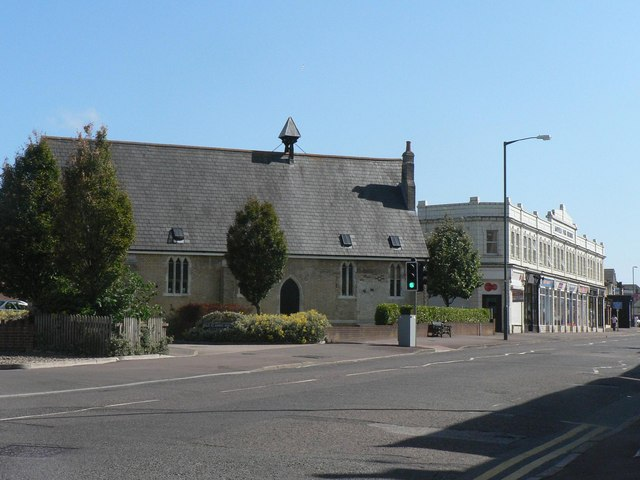
The old school from the north

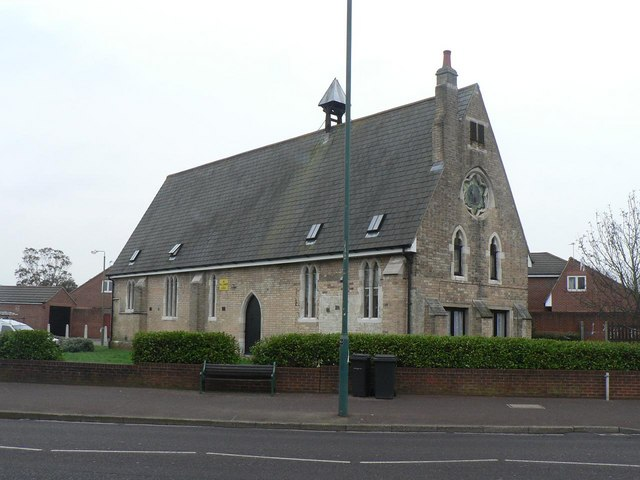
The old school from the west

== See also ==
- List of new churches by G. E. Street
- List of churches in Bournemouth
