= Bournemouth Community Church =

Building in Bournemouth, Dorset, England

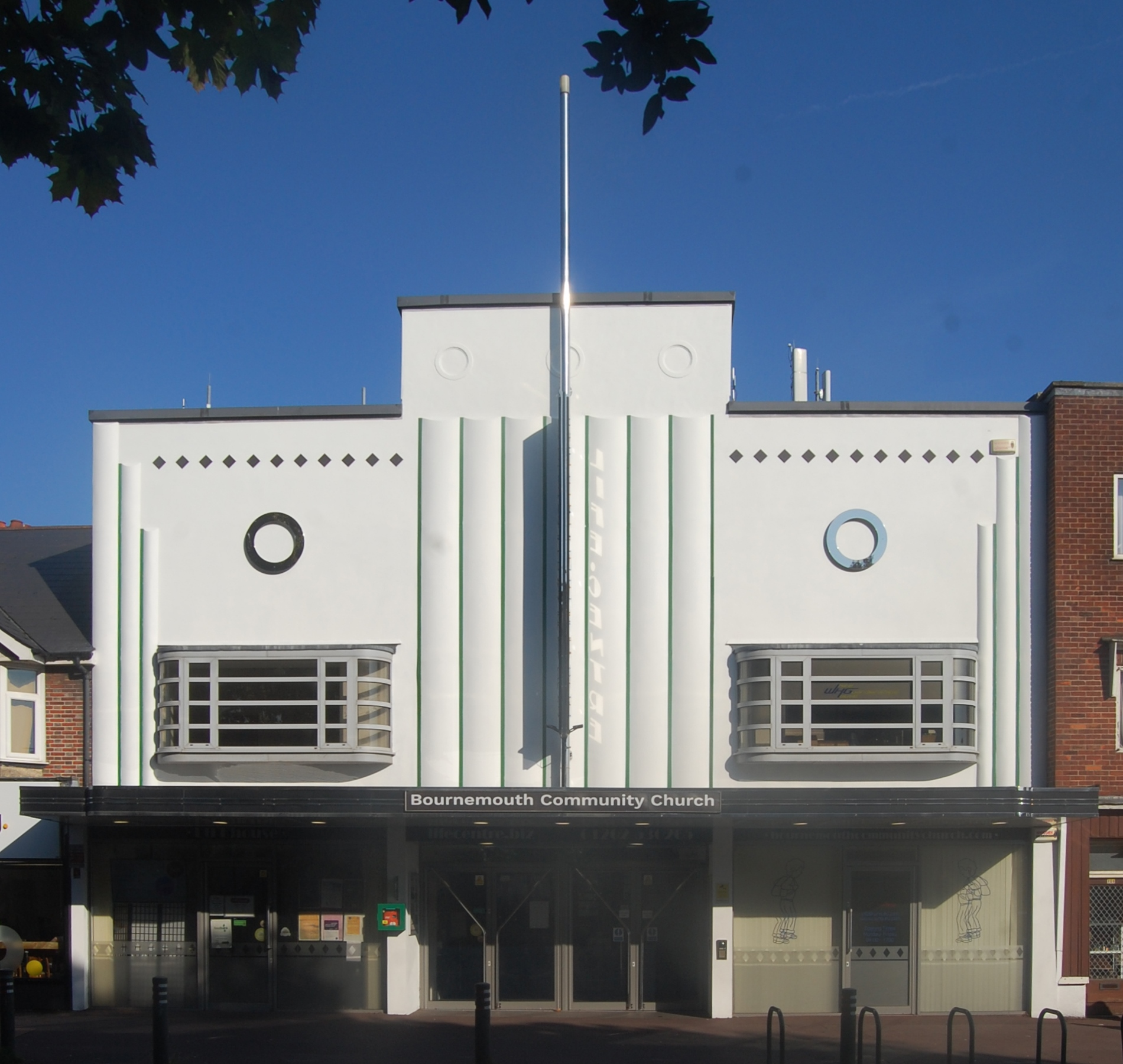
- The building in 2022
- Interactive map of the Bournemouth Community Church area
- Alternative names: Moderne Cinema

General information
- Status: active
- Type: church
- Architectural style: Art Deco architecture
- Location: 711–715 Wimborne Road, Moordown, Bournemouth, United Kingdom
- Coordinates: 50.74944°N 1.87712°W
- Year built: 1935
- Opened: 1935

Design and construction
- Architect: Edward George de Wilde Holding

The Bournemouth Community Church is an Art Deco building in the Moordown area of Bournemouth, England.

== History ==
The Moderne Cinema was built in 1935 by Edward George de Wilde Holding, a specialist architect of cinemas who worked in Bournemouth from 1927 until 1938. The building is in the Art Deco style. The cinema was converted into a bingo hall in 1970 but closed in 2008. It became a church in 2011 and was refurbished in 2013. The building is now used as a church and conference centre known as "Lifecentre".

== See also ==
- List of churches in Bournemouth
