= St Alban's Church, Bournemouth =

Church in Bournemouth, UK

St Alban's Church
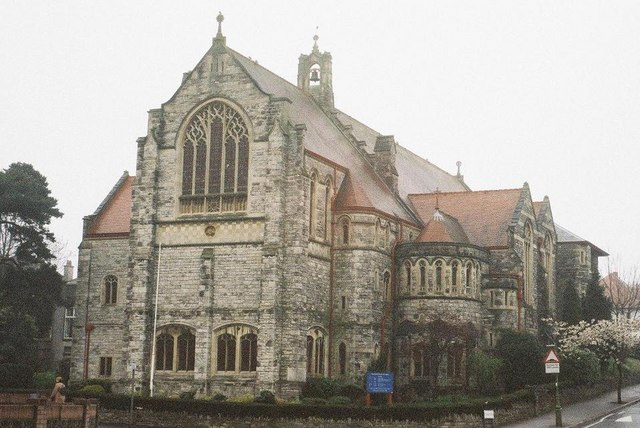
- St Alban's Church in 2001

Religion
- Affiliation: Anglicanism
- Ecclesiastical or organizational status: active

Location
- Location: Bournemouth, Dorset, England
- Interactive map of St Alban's Church
- Coordinates: 50.7386°N 1.86437°W

Architecture
- Type: Church
- Style: Gothic Revival architecture
- Groundbreaking: 8 October 1907
- Completed: 3 June 1909

St Alban's Church is a Grade II* listed Gothic Revival Anglican church in the Charminster area of Bournemouth, Dorset, England. The church stands across Charminster Road from the Church of the Annunciation.

== History ==
The church was designed by George Fellowes Prynne and built as a mother church of St Augustin's Church. The foundation stone was laid on 8 October 1907, and the church was opened on 3 June 1909.

The building is currently occupied and used by Coastline Vineyard, a charismatic church belonging to the Vineyard Movement.

== Gallery ==
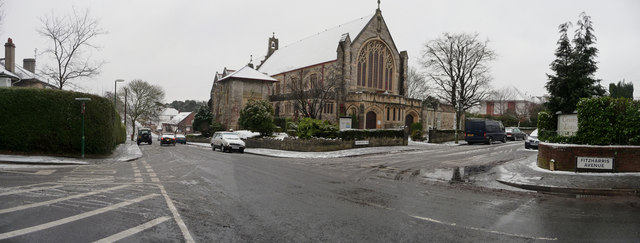
The church as seen from Fitzharris Avenue.

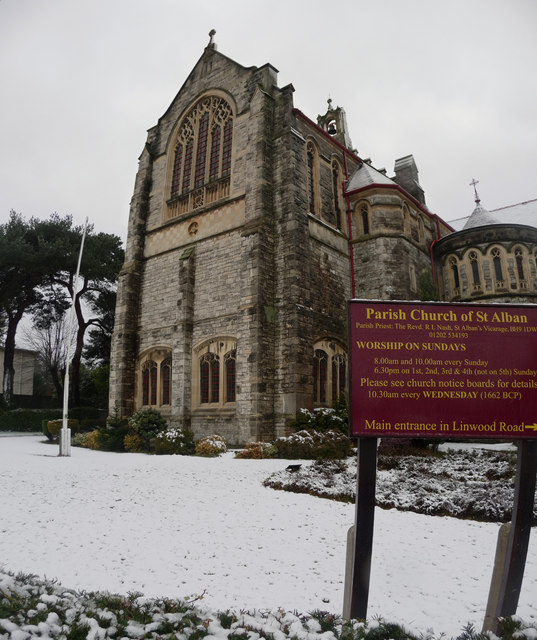
The church as seen from the northeast on a snowy day.

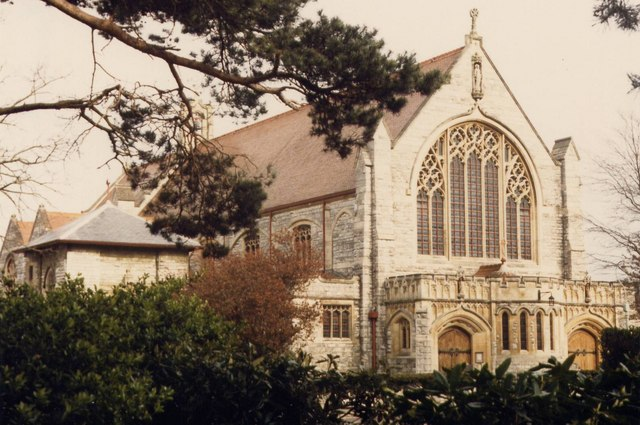
The church in 1990.

== See also ==
- List of churches in Bournemouth
- Grade II* listed buildings in Dorset
