= Kings Park, Boscombe =

Park in Bournemouth, England

Kings Park
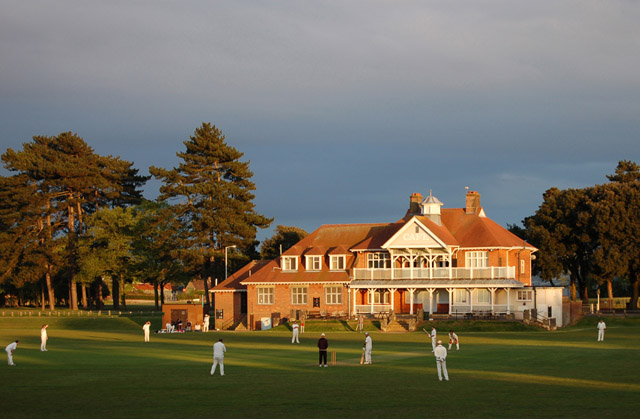
- Kings Park Cricket Ground
- Interactive map of Kings Park
- Type: Public park
- Location: Boscombe in Bournemouth, England
- Coordinates: 50°44′05″N 1°50′06″W
- Created: 1902
- Operator: Bournemouth Borough Council
- Status: Open year round

Kings Park is one of the largest parks that is in Boscombe, Bournemouth, Dorset. It is home to Dean Court, where AFC Bournemouth play.

== History ==
The coronation of King Edward VII and his Queen, Alexandra of Denmark was scheduled to take place on 26 June 1902. To mark the occasion, Bournemouth Council agreed on 20 May 1902 to rename common No 59 as "King's Park" and common No 60 as "Queen's Park". The coronation was postponed until August when the King suffered an attack of appendicitis on 25 June.

== Attractions ==
Facilities include two children's play areas, an outdoor bowling green, an indoor bowling green, an athletics track, a skate park, a cricket field and pavilion/cafe. The park also has a regular Parkrun.
