= Church of the Annunciation, Bournemouth =

Church in Dorset, England

Church of the Annunciation
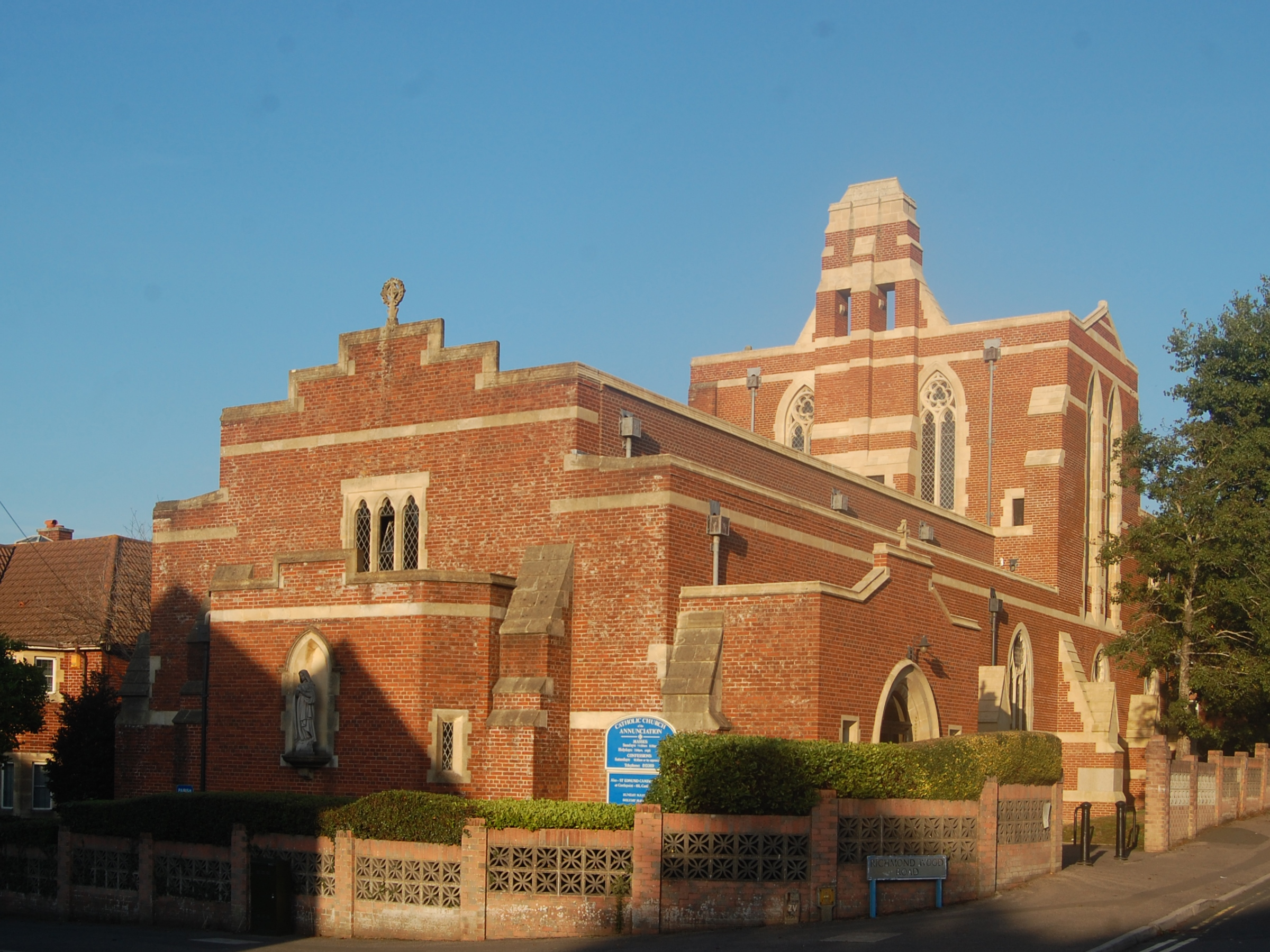
- The church seen from the southwest in 2022

Religion
- Affiliation: Catholic
- Ecclesiastical or organizational status: Active
- Year consecrated: 1906

Location
- Location: 218 Charminster Road, Bournemouth, Dorset, England
- Interactive map of Church of the Annunciation
- Coordinates: 50.7382°N 1.86356°W

Architecture
- Architects: Giles Gilbert Scott; George Frederick Bodley
- Type: Church
- Style: Gothic Revival
- Completed: 1906
- Materials: Red brick

The Church of the Annunciation is a Grade II* listed Gothic Revival Catholic church in the Charminster area of Bournemouth, Dorset, England. The church stands across Charminster Road from St Alban's Church.

== History ==
The Church was built in 1905–06, and was the first church designed by Giles Gilbert Scott with help from George Frederick Bodley. It was originally built as a chapel of ease to the Church of the Sacred Heart, to meet the needs of Catholics who were unable to travel to the latter church in central Bournemouth.

== See also ==
- List of churches in Bournemouth
