= East Cliff Church, Bournemouth =

Church building in Bournemouth, Dorset, UK

East Cliff Church
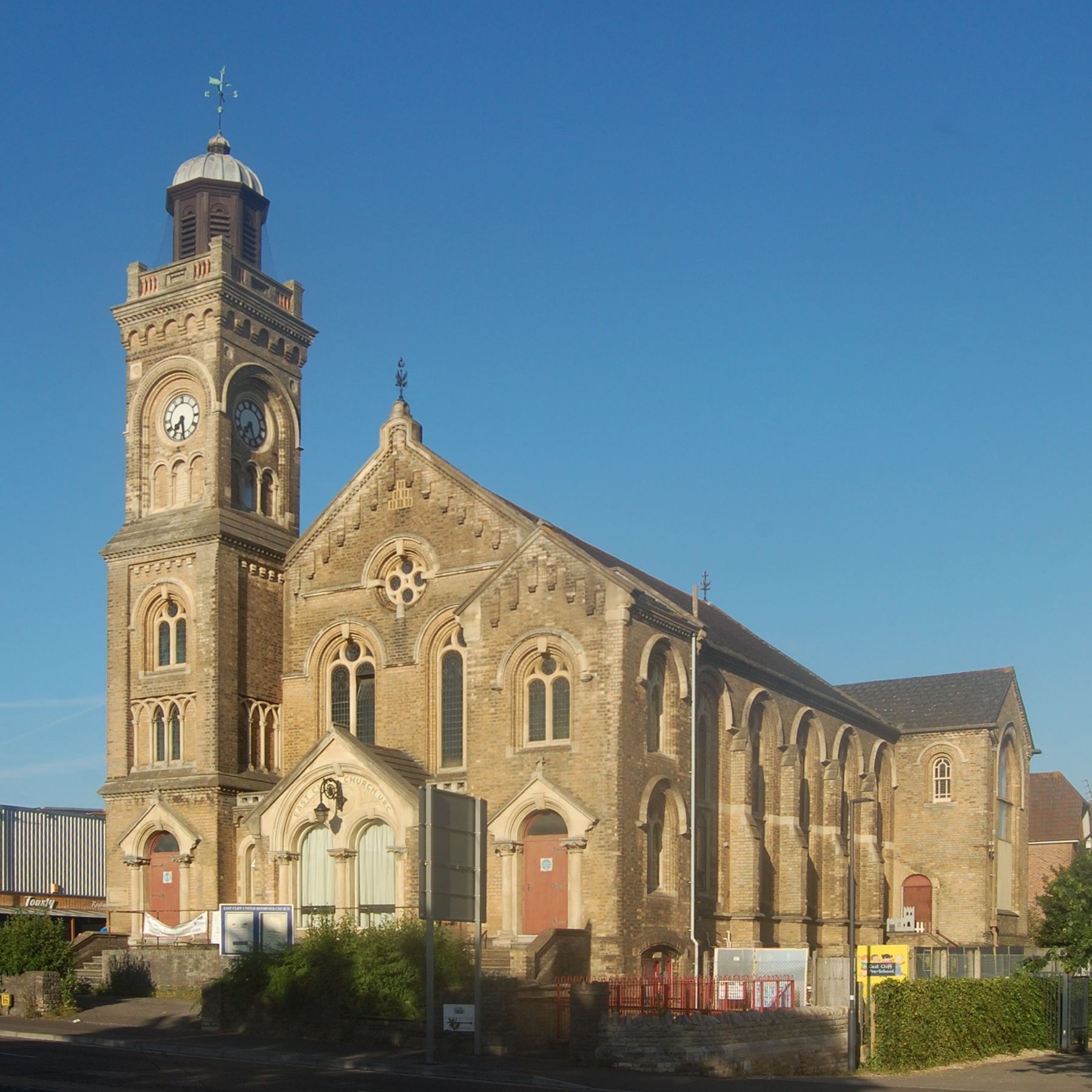
- East Cliff Church in 2022

Religion
- Affiliation: United Reformed Church
- Ecclesiastical or organisational status: active

Location
- Location: Bournemouth, Dorset, England
- Interactive map of East Cliff Church
- Coordinates: 50.725716°N 1.861901°W

Architecture
- Type: Church
- Style: Gothic Revival architecture
- Completed: 1879
- Materials: Grey brick

East Cliff Church is a United Reformed church on Holdenhurst Road in East Cliff, Bournemouth, Dorset, England. The church and its attached former Sunday school and lecture hall were designated a Grade II listed building on 10 November 1987.

== History ==
The congregation began with worship and Sunday school meetings in a house on Holdenhurst Road under the supervision of Richmond Hill Congregational Church. A mission hall was built on the site in 1867. On 17 December 1877, East Cliff became an independent congregation, with 32 members transferring from Richmond Hill.

The present church was built in 1878-1879 to designs by Kemp Welch and Pinder. Its memorial stone was laid on 26 February 1879 and the building opened that December. Lawson and Donkin designed additions to the church in 1889-1891.

East Cliff helped establish missions in Malmesbury Park in 1894 and on Spring Road in 1898. Its membership, including the two missions, rose from 243 in 1901 to 402 in 1914. The church hosted the autumn meetings of the Hampshire Congregational Union in 1908.

== Architecture ==
The church combines Romanesque and Cinquecento elements. It is built of grey-buff brick with stone dressings and has a south aisle and a clock tower at the north-west corner. A wheel window sits above the gabled west porch, and the tower is topped by a timber cupola with a lead-covered dome. One of the east wings incorporates the apse, while the wider wing beyond it housed the Sunday school at ground level and a lecture hall above.

Inside are panelled pews, a U-shaped gallery and coloured glass from the early 20th century. The apse has a ribbed half-dome and a circular skylight. A minister's house formerly adjoined the east end of the building and was demolished around 1985.

== Gallery ==
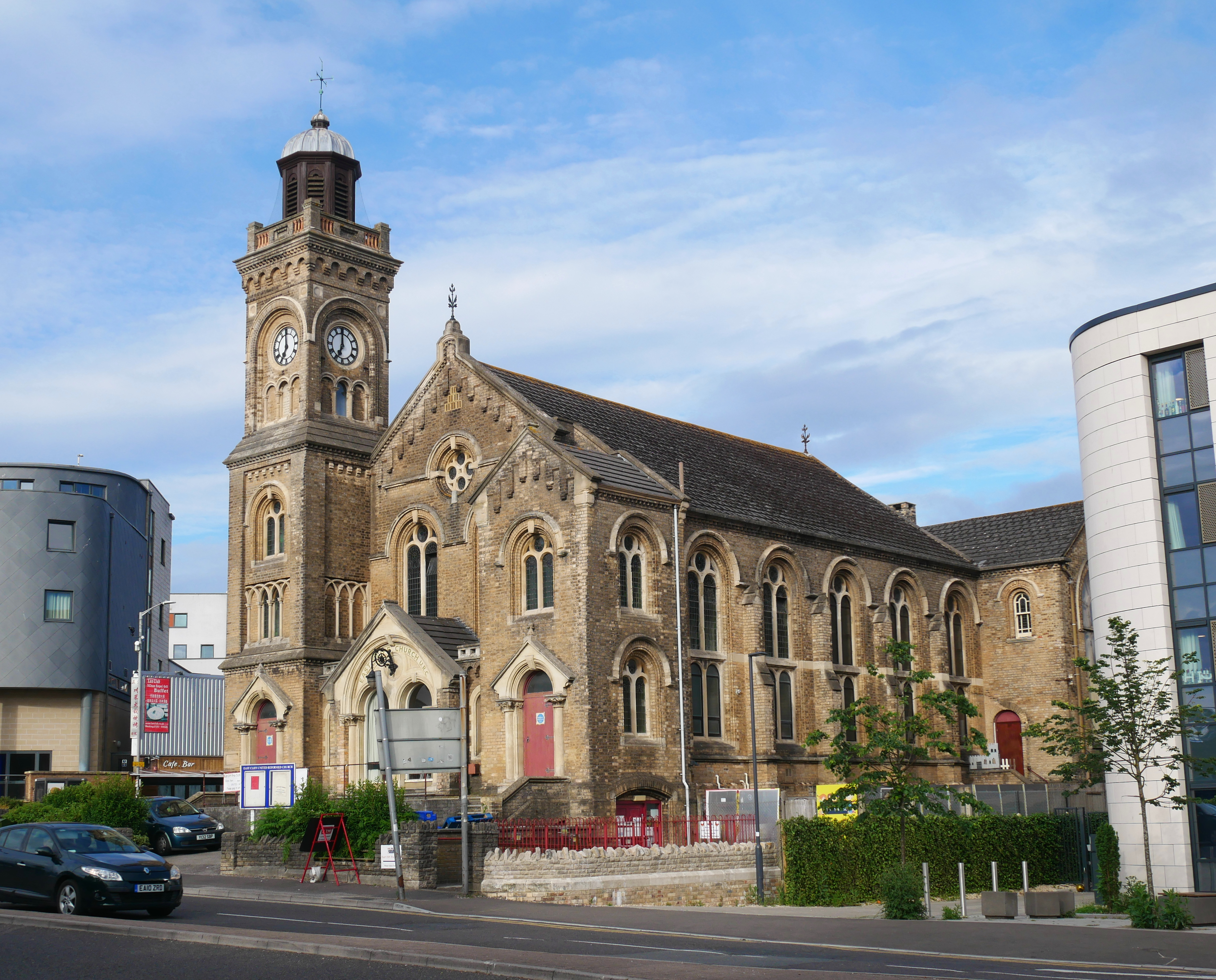
The church in 2021.

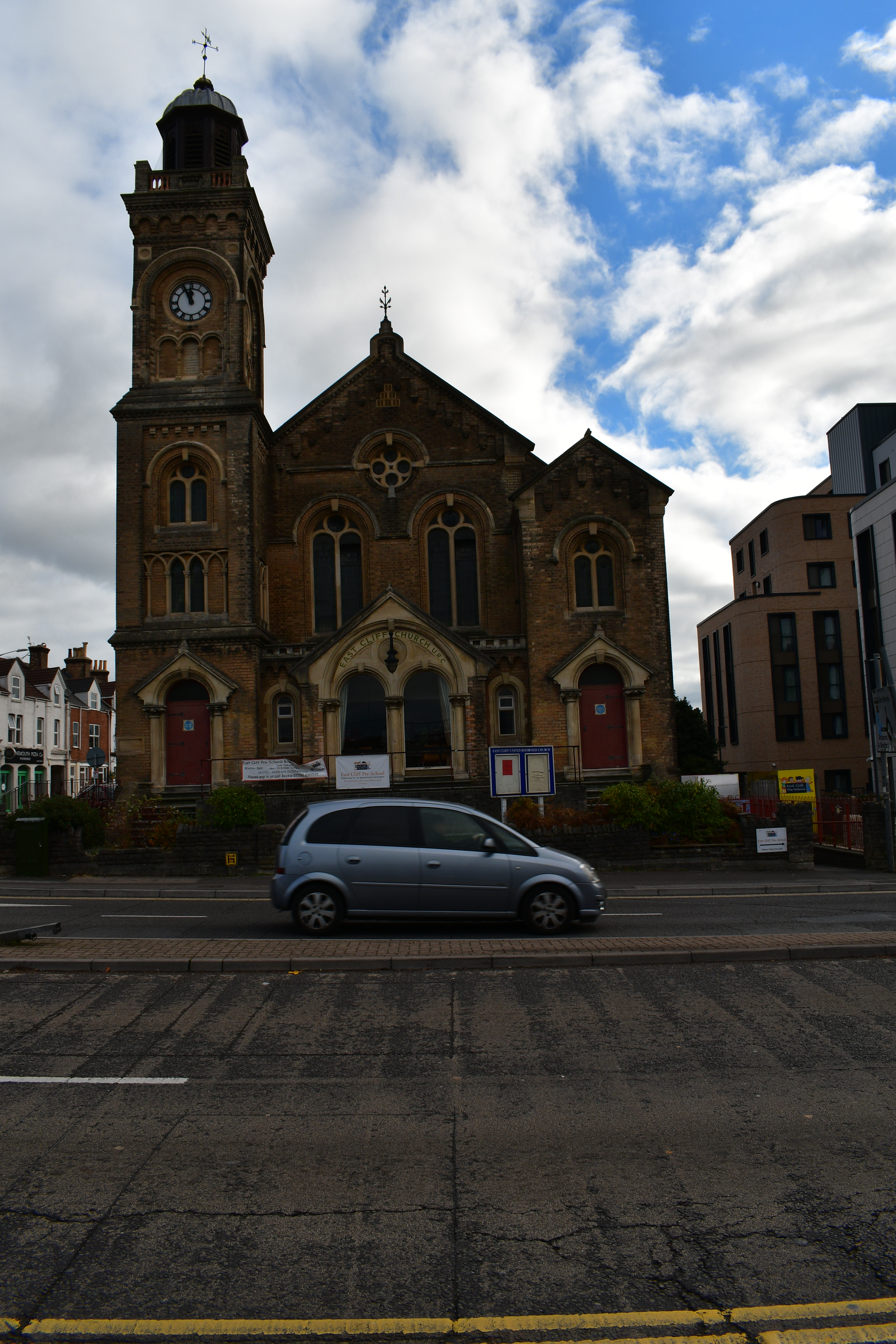
Front view.

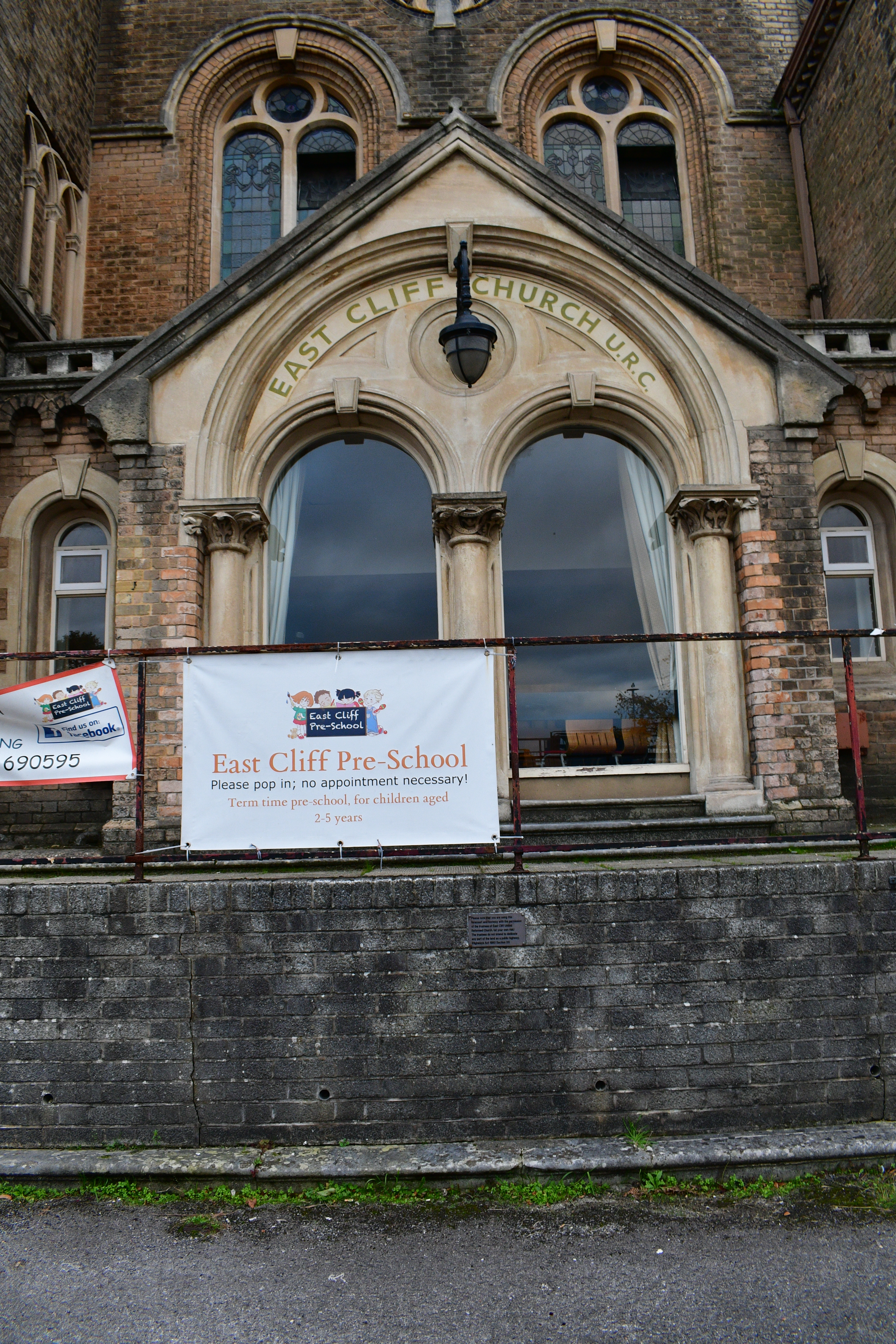
Church entrance.

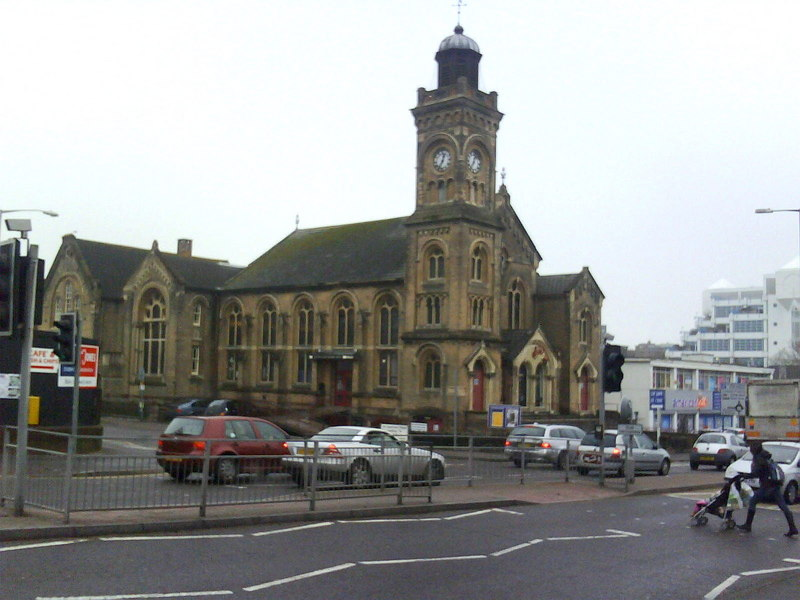
From the road.

== See also ==
- List of churches in Bournemouth
