= St Katharine's Church, Southbourne =

Church in Bournemouth, Dorset, England

St Katharine's Church
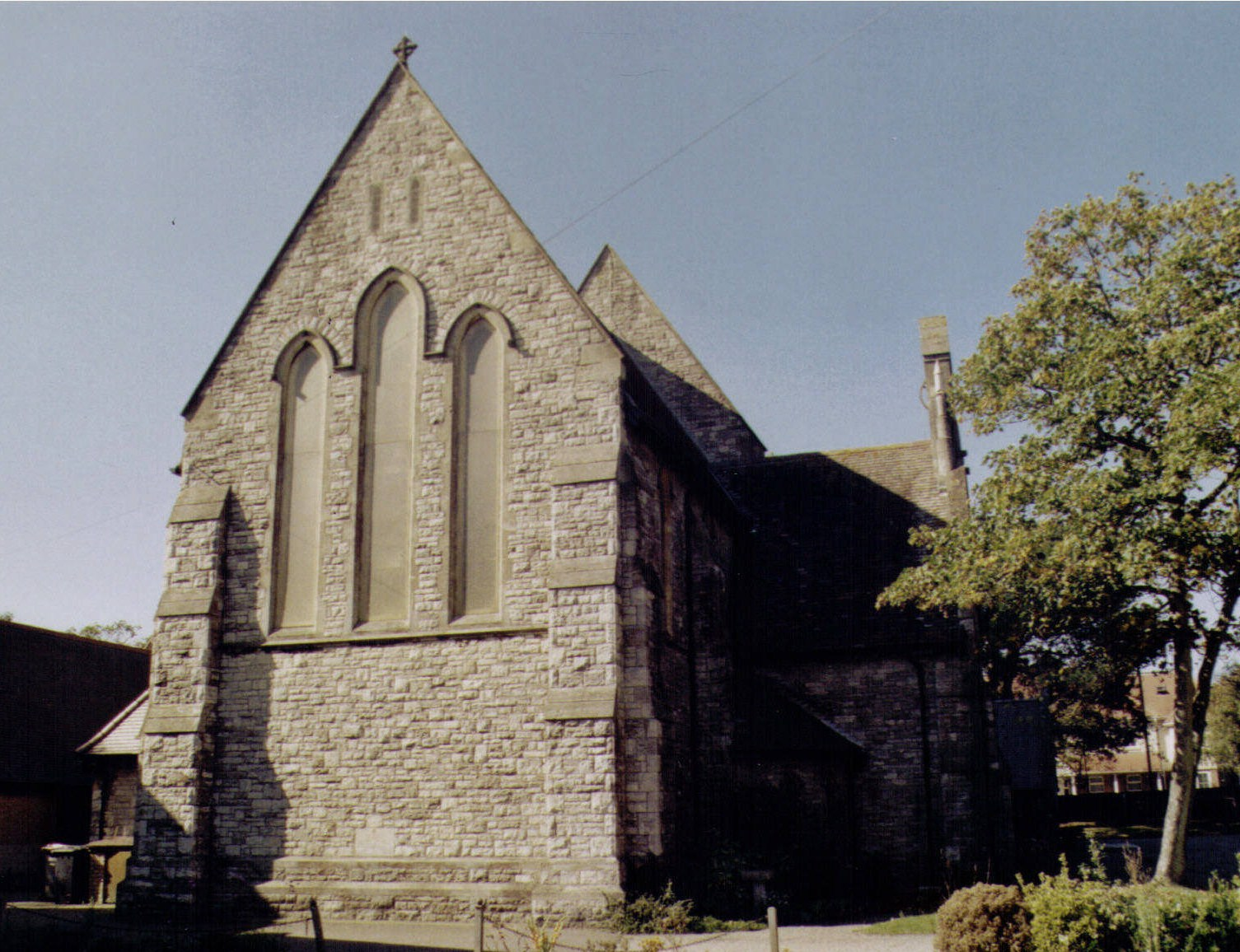
- St Katharine's Church in 2022

Religion
- Affiliation: Anglicanism
- Ecclesiastical or organizational status: active

Location
- Location: Church Road, Southbourne, Bournemouth, Dorset, England
- Interactive map of St Katharine's Church
- Coordinates: 50.721398°N 1.794015°W

Architecture
- Architect: Alfred Birt
- Type: Church
- Style: English Gothic architecture
- Completed: 1881-1892

Website
- stkathnic.co.uk

St Katharine's Church is a Grade II listed church in the Southbourne area of Bournemouth.

== History ==
The church was constructed from 1891 to 1892 by Alfred Birt. The church is built from Purbeck rubble with limestone dressings. In 2024, it was reported that the church would merge with other churches to become the parish of Southbourne on Sea.

== See also ==
- List of churches in Bournemouth
- List of Anglican churches
