= Richmond Park, Bournemouth =

Area of Bournemouth, England

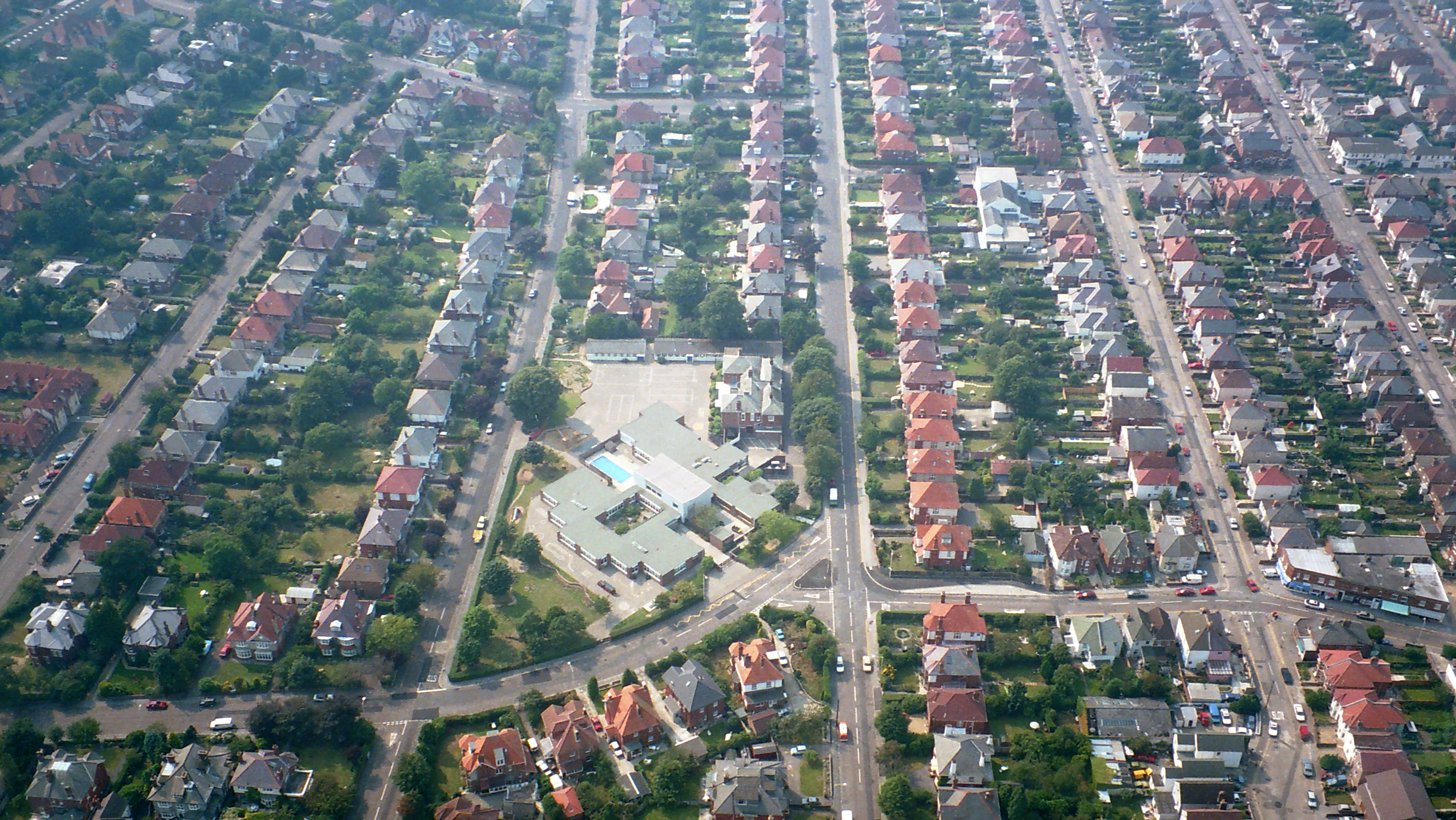
Richmond Park, Bournemouth.

Richmond Park is an area of Bournemouth, Dorset, England. The area is north of Richmond Hill and Springbourne, east of Charminster, west of Queen's Park and south of Winton and Queen's Park.

== History ==
Richmond Park was the location of two murders in 2002; the Murder of Jong-Ok Shin and the Murder of Heather Barnett.

== Buildings ==
- Richmond Park Church
- Malmesbury Park Primary School
- St Andrew's Church, Malmesbury Park

== Areas ==
Malmesbury Park is in the south of Richmond Park, and was formerly land owned by James Harris, 3rd Earl of Malmesbury. The historic St Andrew's Church, Malmesbury Park stands on Bennett Road.

== Culture ==
Richmond Park has a bowls club.

== Politics ==
Richmond Park is part of the Queen's Park ward for elections to Bournemouth, Christchurch and Poole Council which elect two councillors.

Richmond Park is part of the Bournemouth East parliamentary constituency, for elections to the House of Commons of the United Kingdom.
