= Church of All Saints, Southbourne =

Church in Bournemouth, Dorset, England

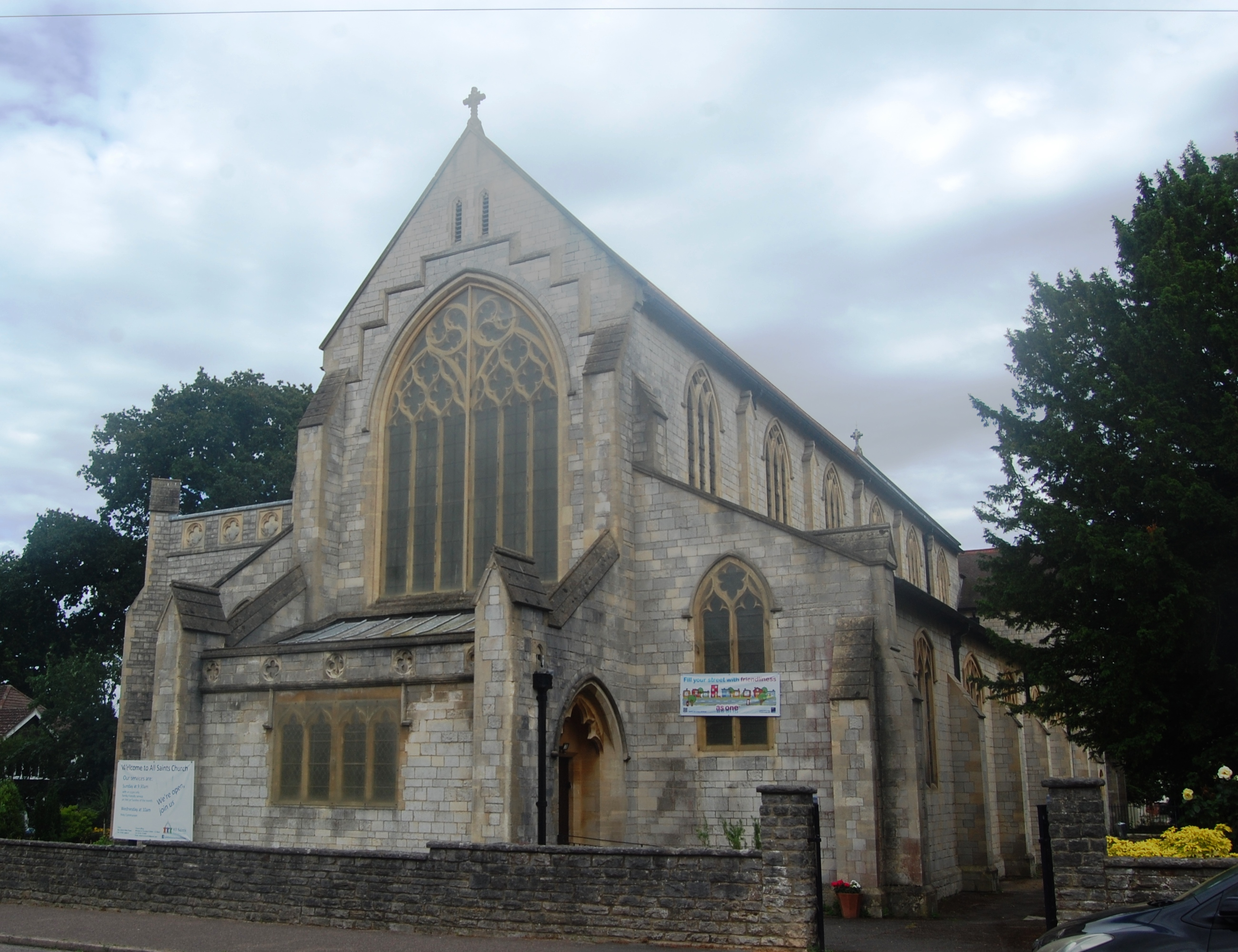
- Church of All Saints in 2022

Religion
- Affiliation: Anglicanism
- Ecclesiastical or organizational status: active

Location
- Location: Castlemaine Avenue, Southbourne, Bournemouth, Dorset, England
- Interactive map of Church of All Saints, Southbourne
- Coordinates: 50.728459°N 1.816441°W

Architecture
- Architect: John Oldrid Scott
- Type: Church
- Style: Gothic Revival
- Completed: 1914

The Church of All Saints is a historic building and church in the Southbourne area of Bournemouth, Dorset, England.

== History ==
The church was constructed in the 1910s by John Oldrid Scott & Son and C.T. Miles using Purbeck limestone.

== See also ==
- List of churches in Bournemouth
- List of Anglican churches
