= Charminster, Bournemouth =

Coordinates: 50°44′18″N 1°51′51″W

Charminster
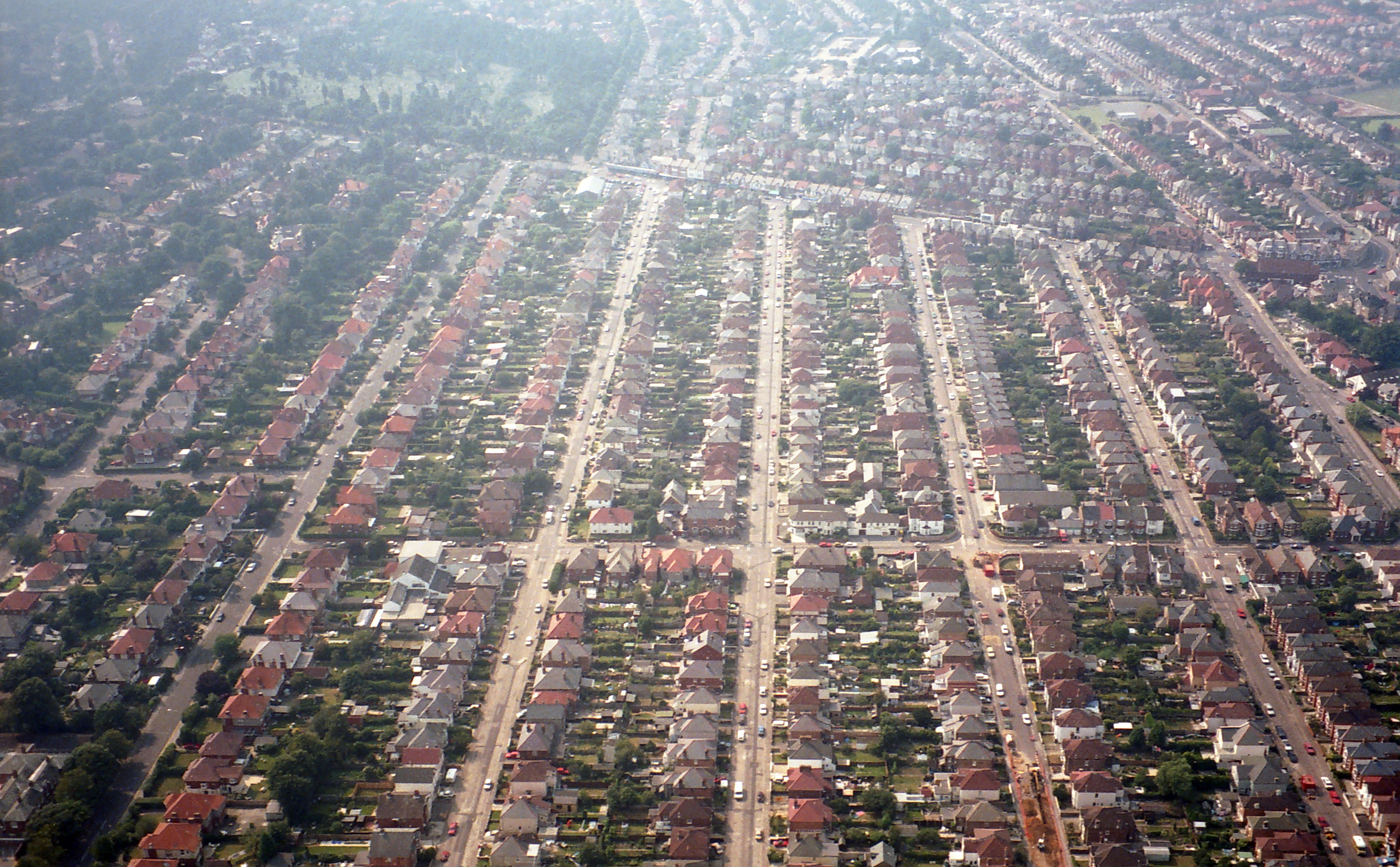
- Charminster in 1992.

- Location within Dorset
- Unitary authority: Bournemouth, Christchurch and Poole
- Ceremonial county: Dorset
- Region: South West
- Country: England
- Sovereign state: United Kingdom
- Post town: BOURNEMOUTH
- Postcode district: BH8
- Dialling code: 01202
- Police: Dorset
- Fire: Dorset and Wiltshire
- Ambulance: South Western
- UK Parliament: Bournemouth East

Charminster is a residential and commercial suburb of Bournemouth in Dorset, situated between the suburbs of Springbourne (to the south-east) and Winton (to the north-west). It was incorporated into the County Borough of Bournemouth in 1901.

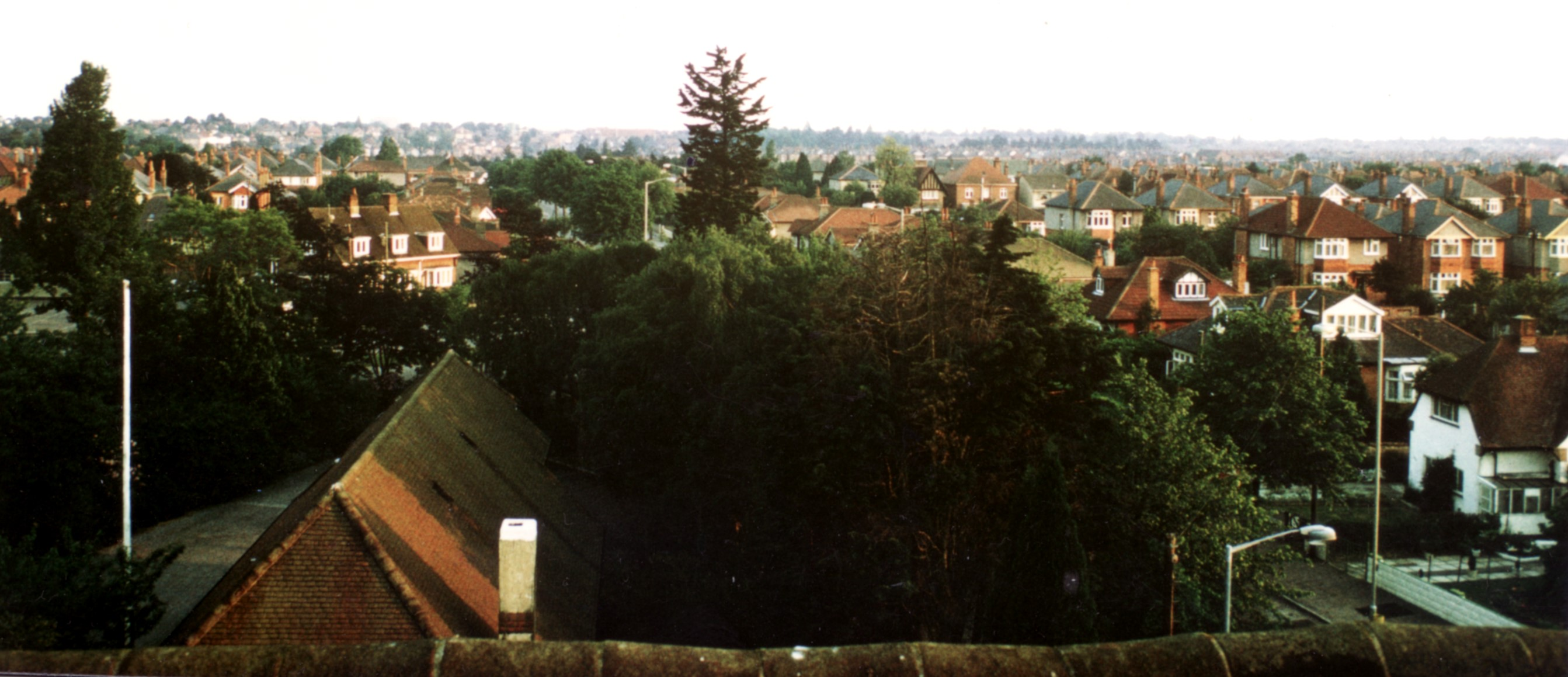
View from St Francis of Assisi church

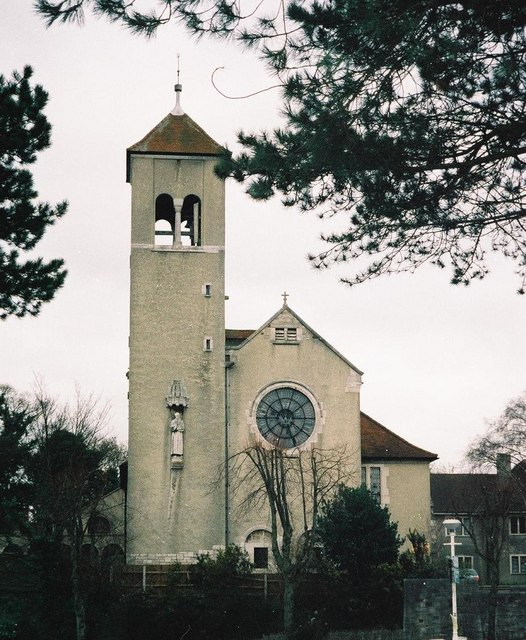
St Francis from the west

== Origins ==
Although there are no known references to Charminster before 1805, the name and settlement predate the nearby districts of Springbourne and Winton by several decades. The first known reference to the district comes in the Christchurch Inclosure Award of 1805, in which a 'Charminster Lane' is cited, along with two plots of land called 'Charminster' in the possession of Matthew Aldridge, the owner of Muscliff Farm. The earliest reference to any inhabitants comes in the 1841 census, in which three families are listed at Charminster: Paul Fletcher, a tinker (with his wife and seven children); John Burridge, a bricklayer (with his wife and four children); and Richard Watton, a labourer (with his wife and ten children). By this stage much of the land in the district was owned by James Harris, 3rd Earl of Malmesbury, who had received 150 acres here under the Christchurch Inclosure Award; he is commemorated in the Malmesbury Park Estate, south-east of the present Charminster Road. It is not known why the name 'Charminster' was applied to this district. A. D. Mills suggests it was a straightforward appropriation of Charminster near Dorchester, which was recorded as a toponym from the Domesday Survey onwards, and which translates as 'church on the River Cerne'; why it should have been applied to this part of Bournemouth, however, remains unclear.

== Development ==
In the 1860s the Earl of Malmesbury, working with the architect and designer Christopher Crabb Creeke, drew up plans to build over Charminster. These plans were suspended in 1866, however, when the Tories returned to power, Malmesbury taking up the position of Lord Privy Seal in the 14th Earl of Derby's third administration. Consequently, the 1870 Ordnance Survey map shows little more than tumuli and brickfields at Charminster, while the suburb of Springbourne was developing independently to the south. The first modern dwellings in Charminster were built around 1880 after Malmesbury's retirement from politics. His nephew and legatee, Edward Harris, 4th Earl of Malmesbury, continued to develop the area, opening up what became known as the Lansdowne Park Estate between Heron Court Road and Fortescue Road.

== Church of the Annunciation ==
One consequence of the development of the Malmesbury Park Estate was the provision of a church just to the north, in the plot now bordered by Charminster Road, Richmond Wood Road and Richmond Park Avenue. This was The Church of the Annunciation, designed by the 26-year-old Giles Gilbert Scott with George Frederick Bodley as joint architect; the latter had already overseen the young Scott's work on Liverpool Cathedral. The builders were McWilliam & Son of Bournemouth, and the building was completed in 1907. It was originally put up as a chapel of ease to the Church of the Sacred Heart, to meet the needs of Catholics from the Winton and Malmesbury Park areas who were unable to travel to the latter church in central Bournemouth.

== Municipal facilities ==
A fresh spate of housebuilding took place north of Alma Road and Richmond Park Road in the 1920s, resulting (amongst other things) in the provision of Charminster Library, designed by F. P. Dolamore and opened in 1932. A further development in this area was the relocation in 1939-40 of the town grammar school, Bournemouth School, from its original premises in Portchester Road to a larger site along the newly-cut East Way. This was the result of a petition presented to Bournemouth Borough Council, owners of the latter site, by a group of the school's alumni. An attendee of the school around this time was the future actor Charles Gray, who grew up in Howard Road. Another school, a secondary modern, was added on the south side of East Way in the post-war period to meet the needs of the expanding populace. This was Summerbee School, designed by the borough architect John Burton and named after Alderman Frank Summerbee, who sat on the town's education committee; it was opened by Cllr. Harry Mears in September 1953. The school was later renamed The Bishop of Winchester School and was reopened in 2010 as The Bishop of Winchester Academy.

== Politics ==
Charminster is split across three wards for elections to Bournemouth, Christchurch and Poole Council primarily Winton East and Queen's Park in addition to Talbot and Branksome Woods.

Charminster is split across the Bournemouth East and Bournemouth West parliamentary constituencies, for elections to the House of Commons of the United Kingdom. Charminster Road, the high street of the settlement, marks the boundary. The Bournemouth East MP is Tom Hayes.
