= St Andrew's Church, Malmesbury Park =

Church in Bournemouth, Dorset, England

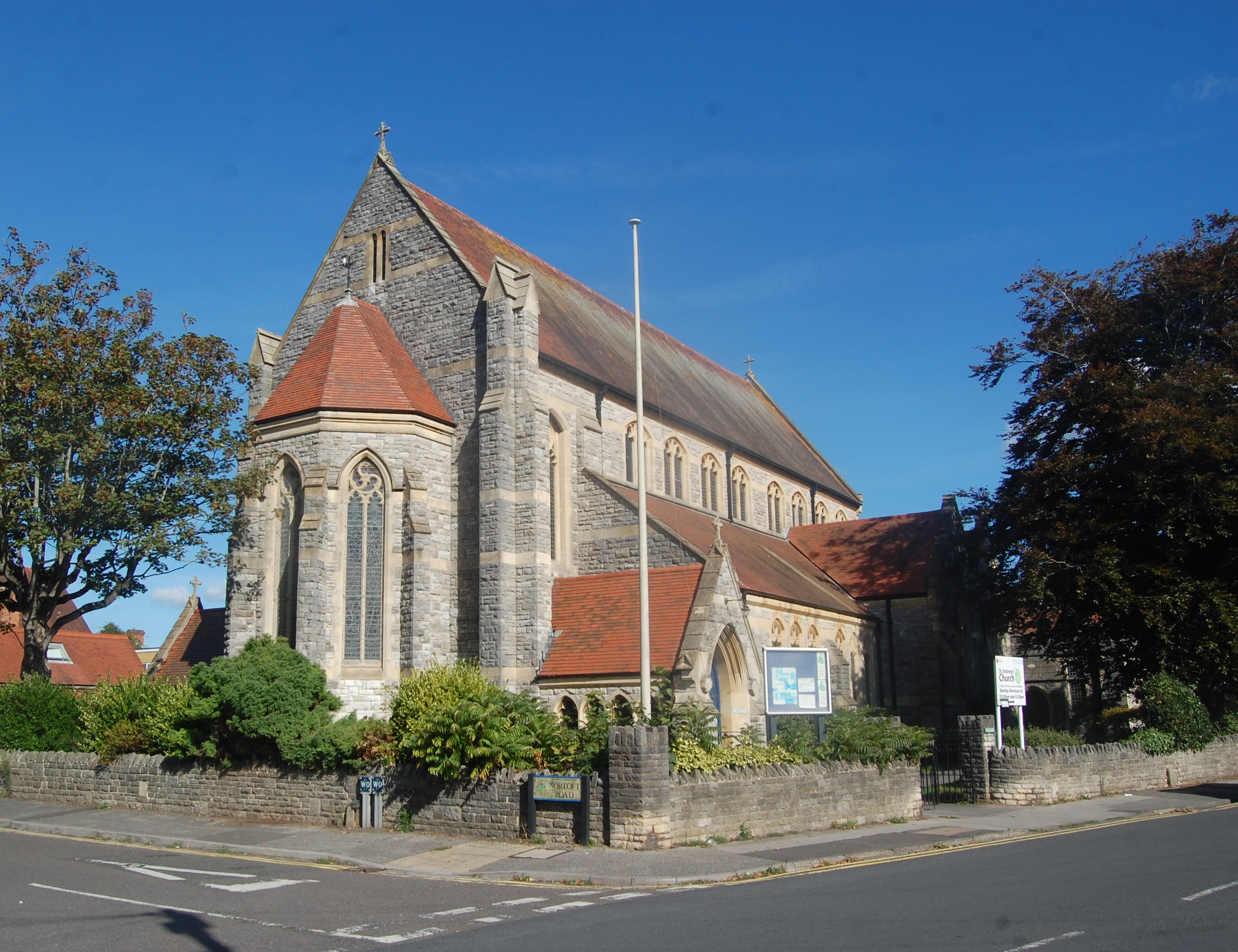
- St Andrew's Church in 2022

Religion
- Affiliation: Anglicanism
- Ecclesiastical or organisational status: active

Location
- Location: Malmesbury Park, Bournemouth, Dorset, England
- Interactive map of St Andrew's Church, Malmesbury Park
- Coordinates: 50.733757°N 1.859002°W

Architecture
- Architects: J. A. Chatwin; Sidney Tugwell
- Type: Church
- Style: Gothic Revival
- Completed: 1890s

The St Andrew's Church is a historic building and church in the Malmesbury Park area of Bournemouth, Dorset, England.

== History ==
The church was constructed in 1890s by J. A. Chatwin jointly with Bournemouth architect Sidney Tugwell. The church is constructed from Purbeck stone. Historic England classified it as a Grade II listed building on 27 February 1976.

== See also ==
- List of churches in Bournemouth
- List of Anglican churches
