= The Bishop of Winchester Academy =

Location
- Mallard Road; Charminster; Bournemouth, Dorset, BH8 9PW; England; 50.7477°N 1.84948°W

Information
- Type: Academy
- Religious affiliation: Church of England
- Established: 1953
- Local authority: Bournemouth, Christchurch and Poole
- Trust: Portsmouth and Winchester Diocesan Academies Trust
- Department for Education URN: 136120 Tables
- Ofsted: Reports
- Headteacher: Paul McKeown
- Gender: Co-educational
- Age: 11 to 18
- Enrolment: 1,187
- Website: http://www.tbowa.org/

The Bishop of Winchester Academy is a co-educational secondary school and sixth form with academy status, located in the Charminster area of Bournemouth in the English county of Dorset.

The school was first established in 1953 as Summerbee Secondary Modern School. The original school building was designed by the borough architect John Burton, and was named after Alderman Frank Summerbee, who sat on the town's education committee. The school was opened by Cllr. Harry Mears in September 1953. The school later became a community comprehensive school.

In 2004 the school was formally taken over by the Church of England Diocese of Winchester, and became a voluntary aided school. It was also renamed The Bishop of Winchester School, named after the Bishop of Winchester. On 1 September 2010 the school converted to academy status and was renamed The Bishop of Winchester Academy.

The Bishop of Winchester Academy offers GCSEs and BTECs programmes of study for pupils, while students in the sixth form have the option to study from a range of A Levels, Cambridge Technicals and further BTECs. The school also has a specialism in mathematics.

== Notable Former Pupils ==
- Julian Bleach, actor
