= First Church of Christ, Scientist (Bournemouth) =

Former church in Bournemouth, Dorset, England

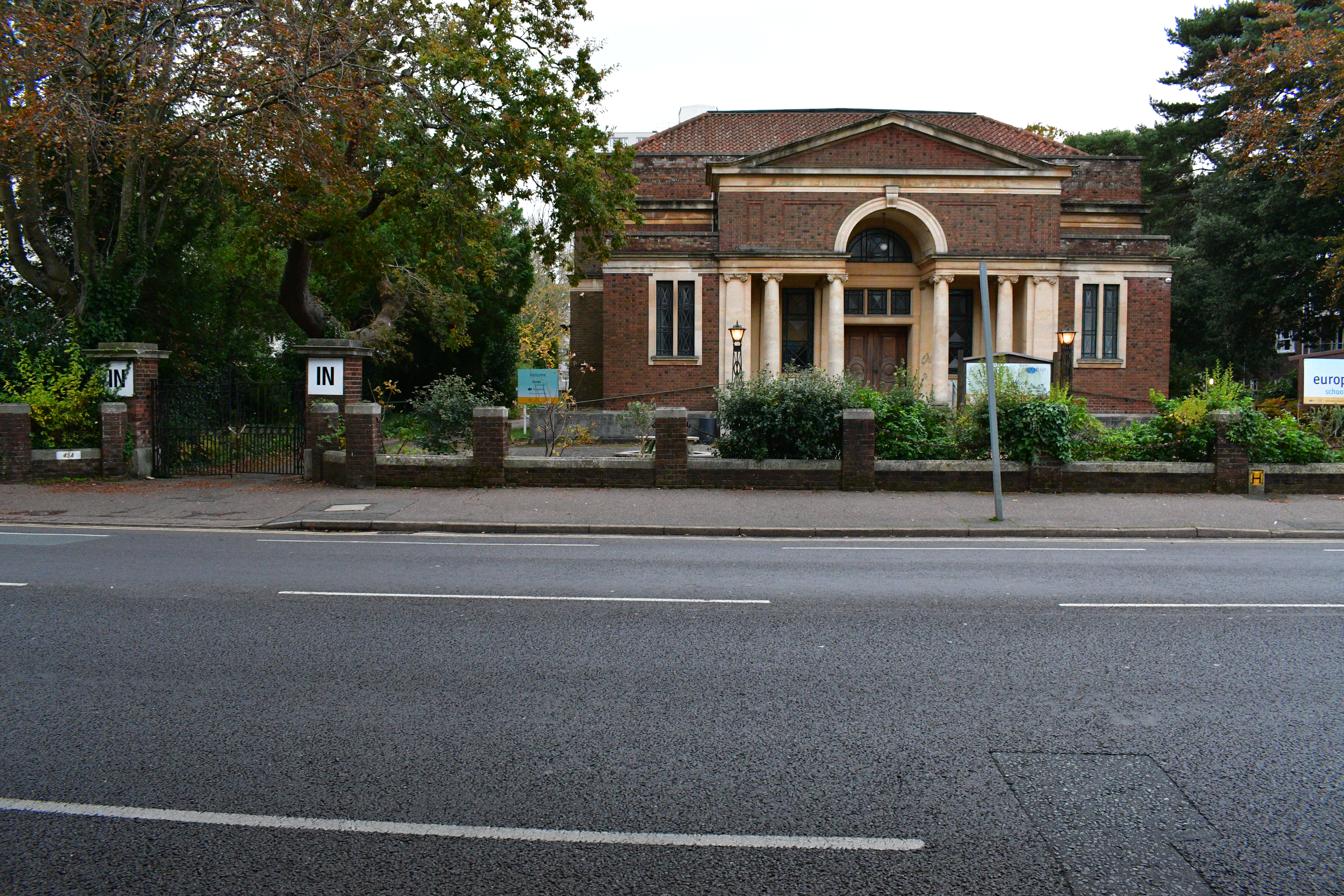
- The church in 2021

Religion
- Affiliation: First Church of Christ, Scientist
- Ecclesiastical or organizational status: defunct

Location
- Location: Bournemouth, Dorset, England
- Interactive map of First Church of Christ, Scientist
- Coordinates: 50.722514°N 1.853764°W

Architecture
- Type: Church
- Style: Neo-Georgian architecture
- Completed: 1926

The First Church of Christ, Scientist is a Grade II listed building and former church in Bournemouth, Dorset, England.

== History ==
The church was constructed in 1926. It was designed by W.J. Dacombe. The church is of Neo-Georgian style and features Plumb-coloured Flemish bond brick and Ham Hill stone dressings. Later it was used by the Europa School of English.

== See also ==
- List of churches in Bournemouth
- First Church of Christ, Scientist
