= St Augustin's Church, Bournemouth =

Church building in Bournemouth, Dorset, England

St Augustin's Church
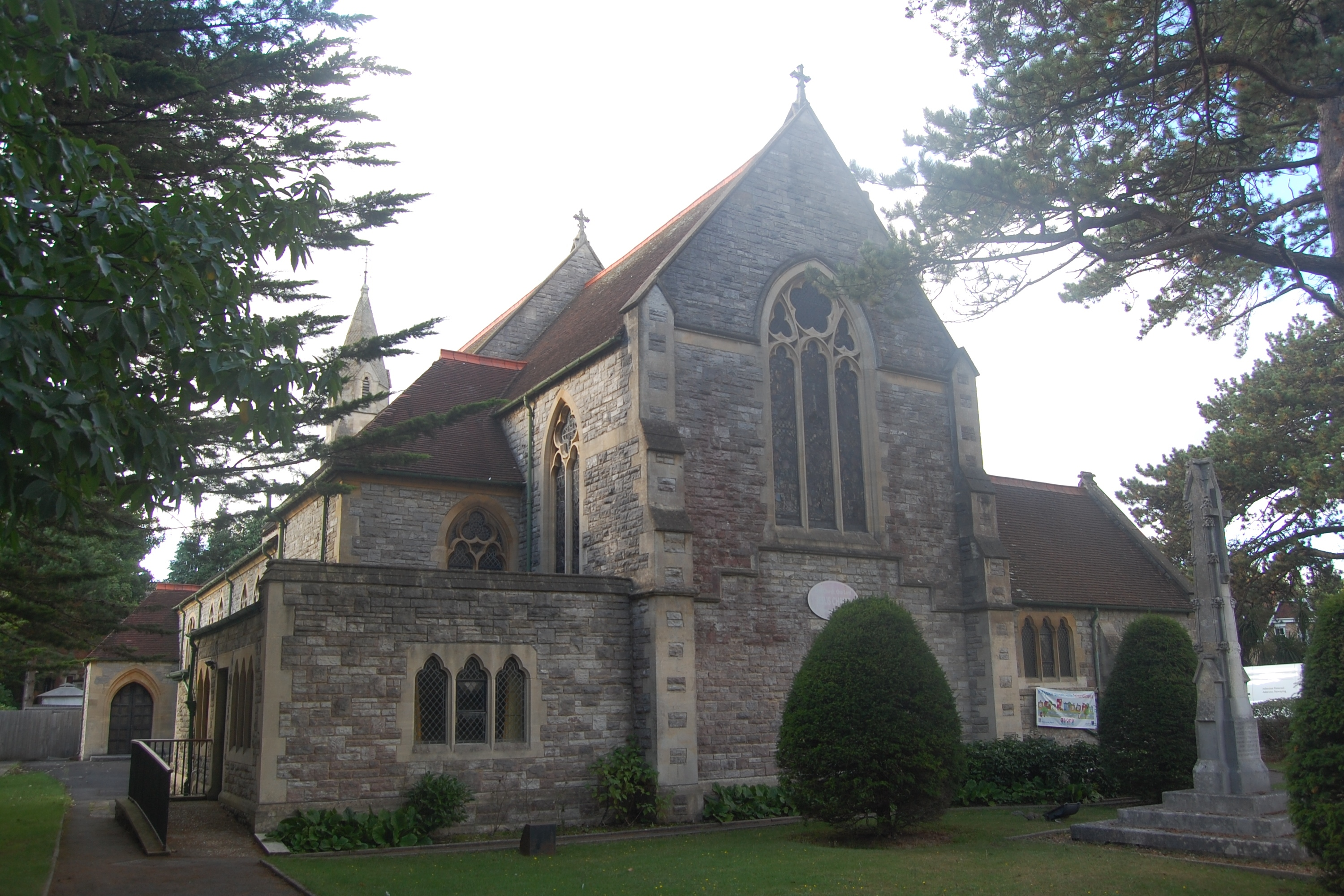
- St Augustin's Church in 2022

Religion
- Affiliation: Anglicanism
- Ecclesiastical or organizational status: active

Location
- Location: Bournemouth, Dorset, England
- Interactive map of St Augustin's Church
- Coordinates: 50.731603°N 1.875046°W

Architecture
- Architect: William Butterfield
- Type: Church
- Style: Gothic Revival architecture
- Completed: 1891-1892

St Augustin's Church is a Grade II listed Gothic Victorian Anglican church in Bournemouth, Dorset, England. The church stands across the A347 road from Wimborne Road Cemetery.

== History ==
St. Augustin's church was constructed between 1891 and 1892 as a chapel of ease to St. Stephen's. The church was designed by Gothic Revival architect William Butterfield.

== Gallery ==
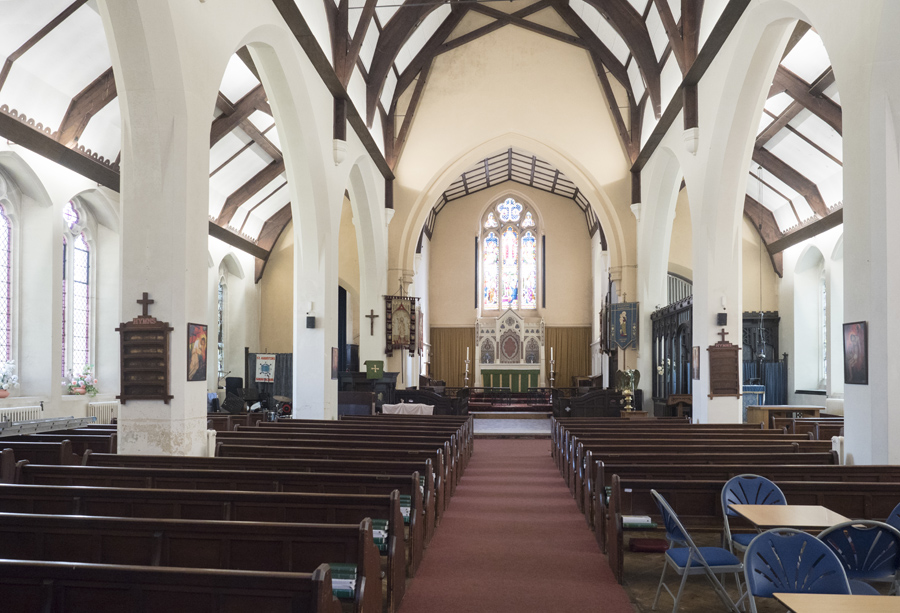
Eastern view inside

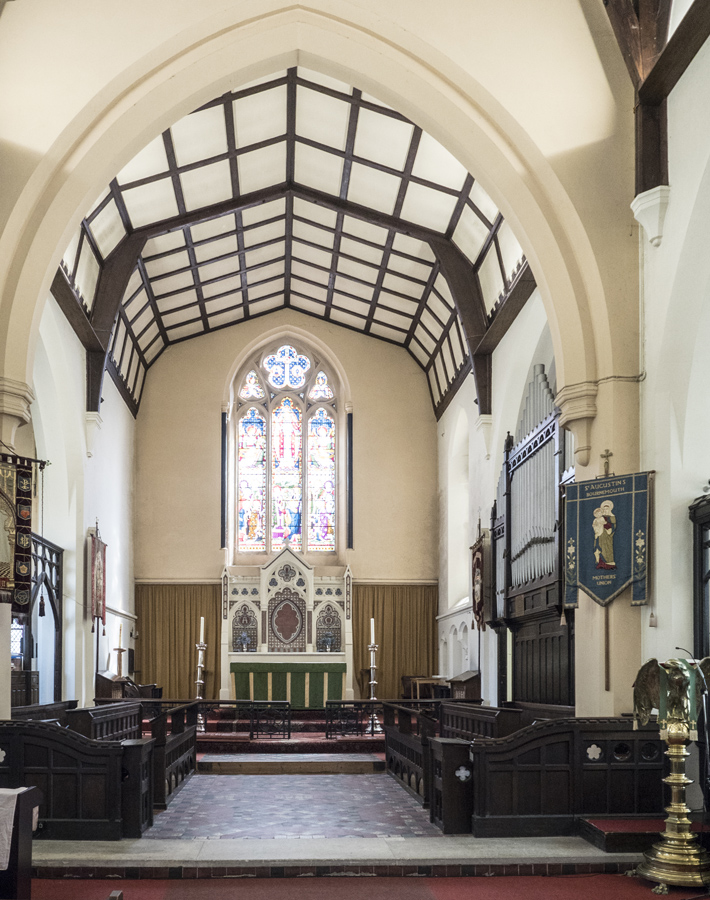
Chancel

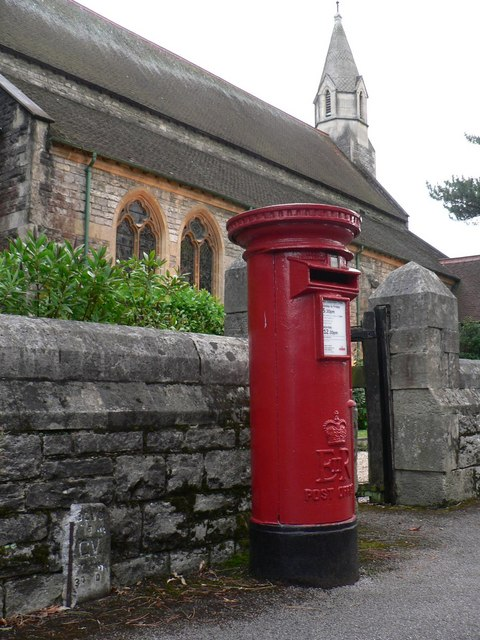
Postbox

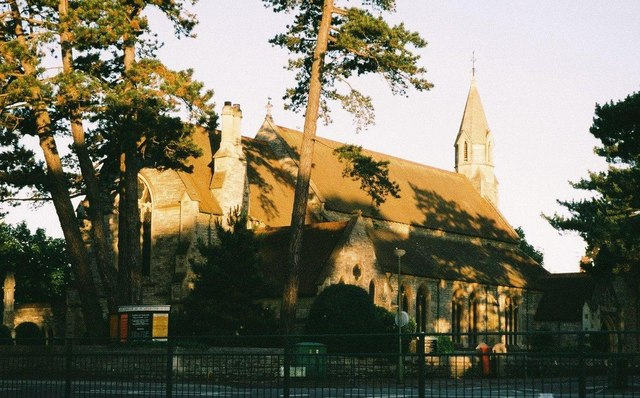
The church seen from Wimborne Road, in 2001

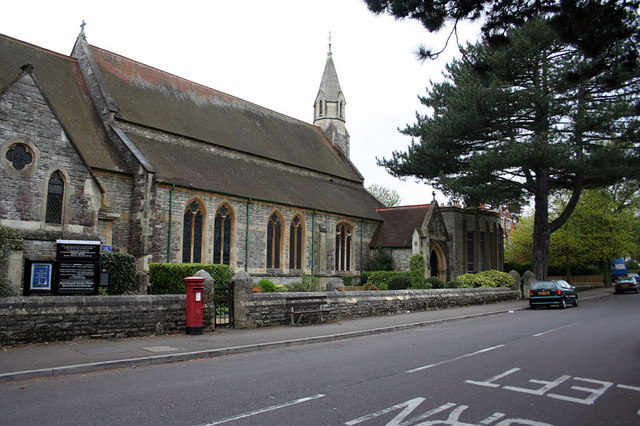
St Augustin's Church in 2006

== See also ==
- List of churches in Bournemouth
