= Southbourne, Dorset =

Suburb of Bournemouth, England

Coordinates: 50.722°N 1.798°W

Southbourne
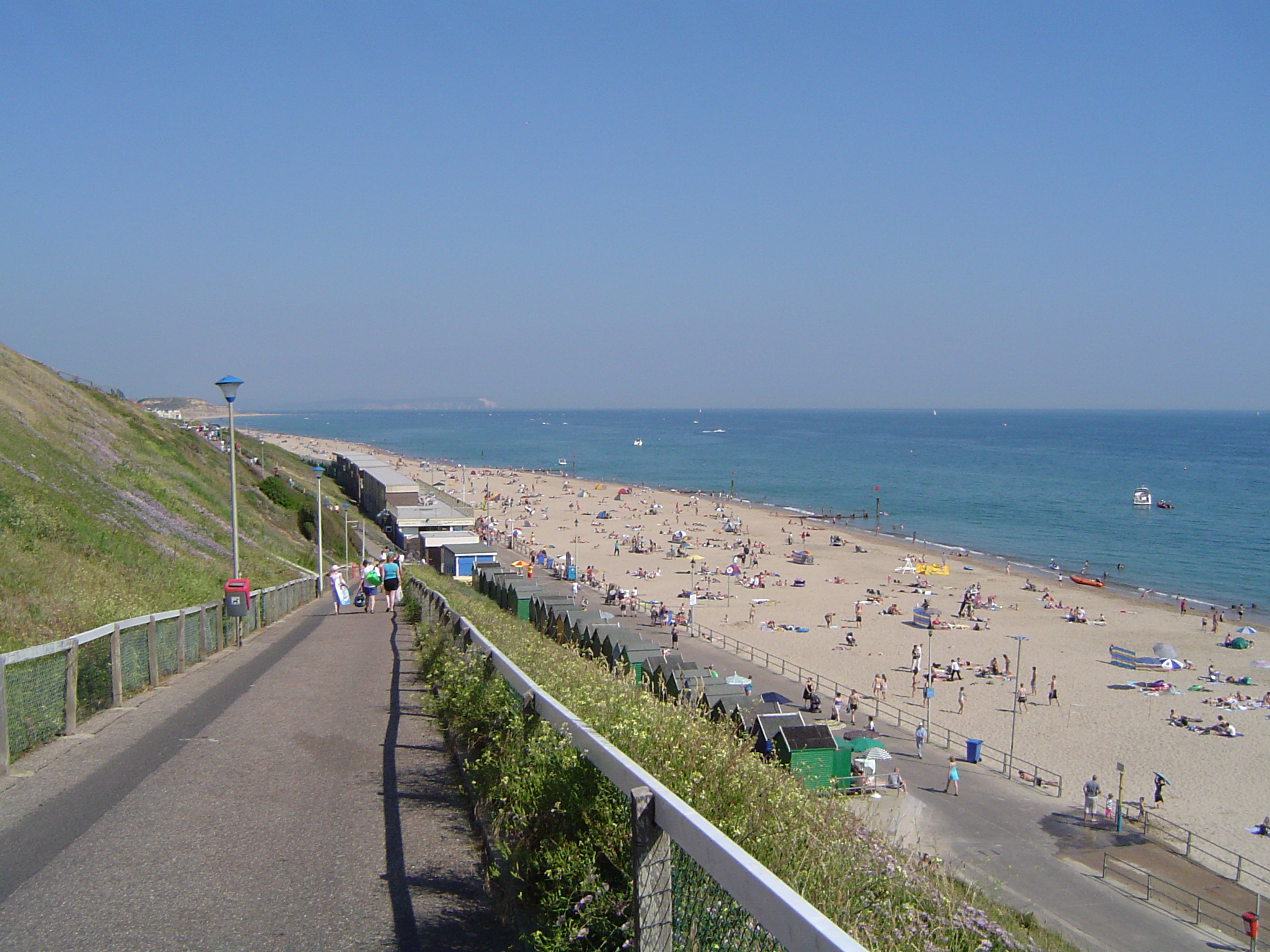
- Southbourne beach

- Location within Dorset
- Population: 18,960 (2 wards, 2011)
- OS grid reference: SZ142913
- Unitary authority: Bournemouth, Christchurch and Poole
- Ceremonial county: Dorset
- Region: South West
- Country: England
- Sovereign state: United Kingdom
- Post town: BOURNEMOUTH
- Postcode district: BH6
- Dialling code: 01202
- Police: Dorset
- Fire: Dorset and Wiltshire
- Ambulance: South Western
- UK Parliament: Bournemouth East

Southbourne is a suburb of Bournemouth, in the unitary authority area of Bournemouth, Christchurch and Poole, in the ceremonial county of Dorset, England. It is situated between Boscombe and Christchurch. The area was previously known as Stourfield. Strictly, Southbourne refers to the area near to the coast; areas further inland are West Southbourne, Tuckton and Wick. It was historically part of Hampshire until 1974.

== History ==
Southbourne was the creation of Thomas Armetriding Compton, an enterprising young physician, who set up general practice in Bournemouth in 1866 and could see the area's potential as a health resort. Prior to his arrival the clifftop land here had been part and parcel of Tuckton Farm, Southbourne being founded precisely where the piggeries had stood. This area of clifftop land was purchased by Compton in 1871 and was later developed by the Southbourne-on-Sea Freehold Land Company, founded in 1882 with Compton as principal shareholder.

Some older properties did exist on the outskirts of the area. Around 1766, for instance, Edmund Bott had built a Georgian mansion to the east of Pokesdown village, commanding views of Christchurch Harbour; he named it Stourfield House. One of the most celebrated inhabitants of Stourfield House was Mary Eleanor Bowes, Countess of Strathmore and Kinghorne, a notorious eccentric who used to set places for her pet dogs at the dinner-table. Stourfield House later became a care home, mainly for servicemen who had been injured in the Great War. Today only the front steps survive, leading to a block of flats in Douglas Mews; the steps are marked by a Blue Plaque. The original, extended building was demolished in 1990.

Southbourne also had a short-lived pier. It was built by Compton's company in 1888 at a cost of £4,000 and was 300 feet long. There were regular boat-trips between the pier at Southbourne and the pier at Bournemouth. The pier, promenade and nearby sea wall built by Dr. Compton (to rival the resort at Bournemouth) were heavily damaged by storms in December 1900 and January 1901. A buyer for the pier was unable to be found and it was eventually demolished in 1909 due to public safety concerns.

On 11 July 1910, Britain’s first international aviation meeting was held on a specially laid out aerodrome consisting of a mile of grassland between Tuckton and the "Double Dykes" near Hengistbury Head. Aviators from around the world competed in a variety of contests, including spot landing, altitude tests, and speed trials (both for the fastest and slowest circuit). Charles Stewart Rolls, co-founder of Rolls-Royce and pioneer aviator was killed on the second day of the meeting, while attempting a precision landing. The event was Britain’s earliest fatal flying accident involving a powered aircraft. The site is marked by a memorial on the sports fields of St Peter's School.

== Today ==
Southbourne is considered a more relaxed area for tourists keen to escape the busier areas of Bournemouth town centre, although the number of guest houses in the area has declined in recent years. The main area of Southbourne is Southbourne Grove, a long shopping street largely occupied by independent shops. Another local centre is Southbourne Crossroads, further east towards Hengistbury Head. Seafield Gardens is a public open space which has, since 2001, won a Green Flag Award; it offers various outdoor facilities, including bowls and tennis. It also features a watertower. The easternmost part of the area is called Hengistbury Head.

Southbourne's primary attraction is its sandy Blue Flag beach, which is considered quieter compared to the more crowded beach along the coast at Bournemouth. Between the clifftop coastal road and the promenade and beach is the Fisherman's Walk Cliff Railway, a funicular railway that provides access to Southbourne beach.

In recent years there has been an increase in the construction of apartment buildings and holiday homes near the beach, examples including the Saltaire Building which was constructed in the early 2000s.

== Religion ==
St Katharine's Church was completed in 1892. The Church of All Saints by John Oldrid Scott was competed in 1914. St Christopher's Church, designed by architect Charles Marriott Oldrid Scott, was completed in 1934.

== Governance ==
In 1894 Southbourne became a separate civil parish, being formed from part of Christchurch, on 30 September 1902 the parish was abolished and merged with Bournemouth. In 1901 the parish had a population of 799. It is now in the unparished area of the unitary authority of Bournemouth, Christchurch and Poole. For elections to Bournemouth, Christchurch and Poole Council, the area is covered by two wards: West Southbourne and East Southbourne and Tuckton. Southbourne is part of Bournemouth East for elections to the House of Commons of the United Kingdom, represented by Tom Hayes from the Labour Party since 2024.
