= St Francis of Assisi's Church, Bournemouth =

Church in Bournemouth, Dorset, England

St Francis of Assisi's Church
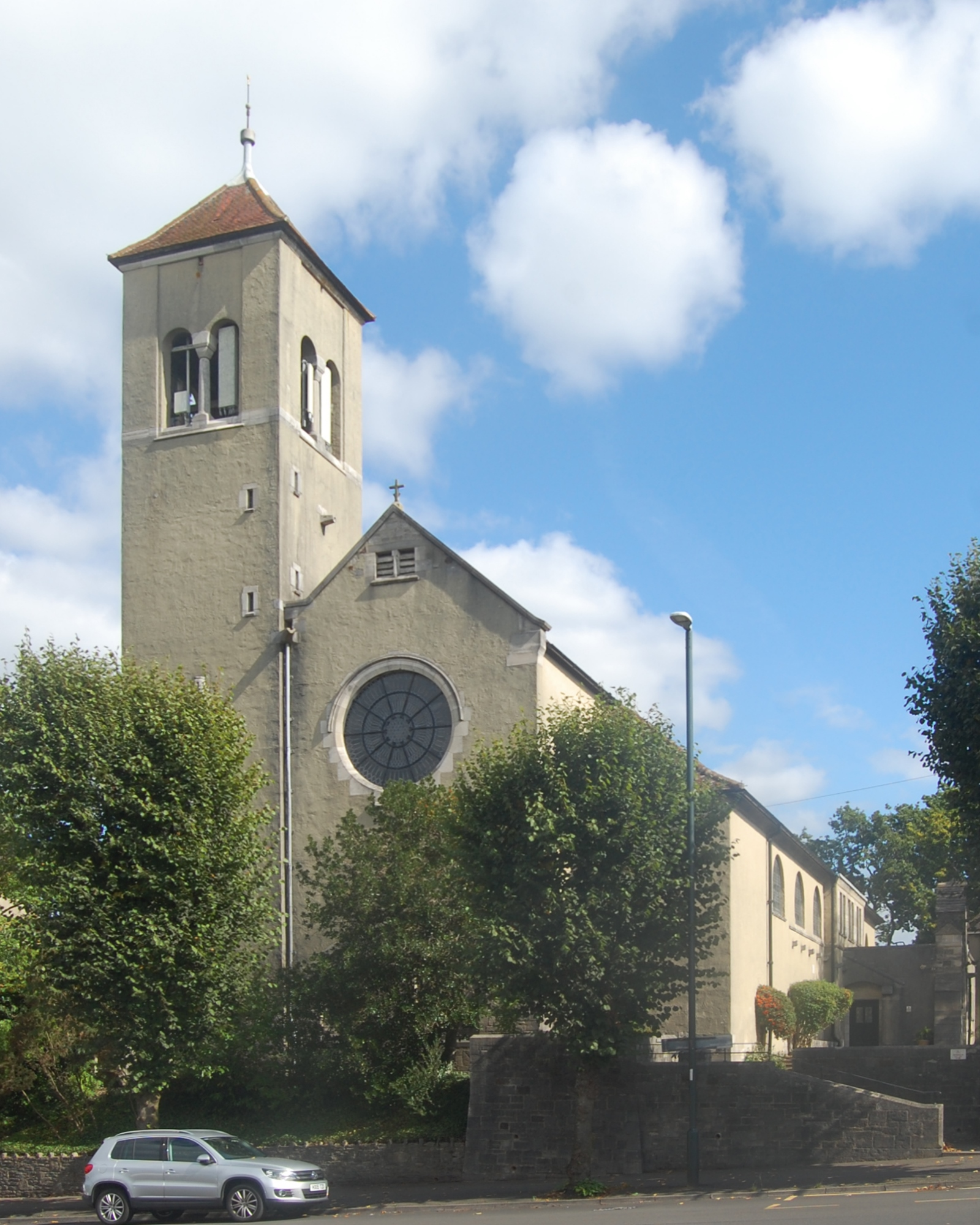
- St Francis of Assisi's Church in 2022

Religion
- Affiliation: Anglicanism
- Ecclesiastical or organisational status: active

Location
- Location: Charminster Road, Charminster, Bournemouth, Dorset, England
- Interactive map of St Francis of Assisi's Church
- Coordinates: 50.748592°N 1.86048°W

Architecture
- Architect: J Harold Gibbons
- Type: Church
- Style: Romanesque Revival architecture
- Completed: 1929-1930

St Francis of Assisi's Church is a Grade II listed church in the Charminster area of Bournemouth, Dorset, England.

== History ==
The church was constructed from 1929 to 1930 by J Harold Gibbons. The church is listed along with the church hall built in 1933 and the vicarage built in 1939. In 2013, the church got a new parish priest after three years without one. The same year the church became a listed building by Historic England.

== See also ==
- List of churches in Bournemouth
- List of Anglican churches
