= Moordown =

Suburb of Bournemouth, England

Coordinates: 50.754°N 1.875°W

- Location within Dorset
- OS grid reference: SZ0089
- Unitary authority: Bournemouth, Christchurch and Poole
- Ceremonial county: Dorset
- Region: South West
- Country: England
- Sovereign state: United Kingdom
- Post town: BOURNEMOUTH
- Postcode district: BH9
- Dialling code: 01202
- Police: Dorset
- Fire: Dorset and Wiltshire
- Ambulance: South Western
- UK Parliament: Bournemouth East

Moordown is a suburb of Bournemouth, situated in the northern part of the borough. It was incorporated into the borough of Bournemouth in 1901, having previously been part of the Christchurch Rural District.

== Antiquity ==
Moordown, according to Michael Stead, "may well be the longest continually settled area of Bournemouth". Evidence of its antiquity was unearthed in 1873, when 97 cremation urns, redolent of the Middle Bronze Age, were exhumed in the Redbreast Hill area; unfortunately most of them "crumbled to atoms" on being exposed to the air. Another, equally erudite historian has written of the "superior rusticated ware" from the Late Bronze Age (c. 800-500 BC), unearthed when Nursery Road was being built up in 1929. Later, in the period of recorded history, Moordown was cited in the charters of Christchurch Priory. In the early fourteenth century, "Roger de Morden" and "Henry de Mourdene" were both mentioned as having paid two measures of rye at Martinmas to support the upkeep of the Priory church.

== Moordown Farm ==
The land at Moordown formed part of the Manor of Christchurch until 1698, when Henry Hyde, 2nd Earl of Clarendon, began selling off parts the manor to fund his son's transvestism and general excesses. By the eighteenth century, the main farm at Moordown was occupied by Henry Hookey - who seems to have been related to the Dean family, who later acquired most of Littledown. The farm was divided up in the nineteenth century and part of it came to vest in the Kemp family, whose sale of land in 1903 resulted in the creation of Evelyn and Naseby Roads. The farm was later renamed "Charminster Farm" and used as a dairy farm by the Hunt family, who remained there until 1978 - but by then, almost all of the land had been sold off. The farmhouse survives, in Homeside Road.

== The mid-19th century ==
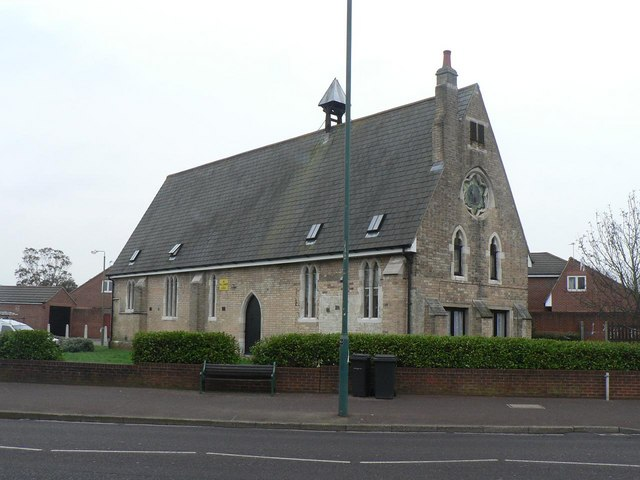
The old school-chapel at Moordown, erected in 1853.

As a hamlet, Moordown enjoyed "a reputation for roughness" throughout the nineteenth century; as one inhabitant recalled, "it was not an uncommon thing for a policeman to be hit over the head at night by a gang of roughs". A typical incident occurred in 1851, when a police officer was assaulted by "an uncivilized set of beings", namely a gang of eight Moordown reprobates. Among them was the notorious Solomon Troke (c. 1831-1920), also known as Solomon Head, who received his first poaching conviction when he was fifteen, and had notched up a further thirteen convictions by 1864. He later became a gamekeeper - patrolling the Haddon Hill estate in the Queen's Park district of Bournemouth, and being awarded a gun by his appreciative employer, James Harris, 3rd Earl of Malmesbury. Ultimately he retired to Moordown, living out his last years in quiet respectability at 14 Nursery Road.

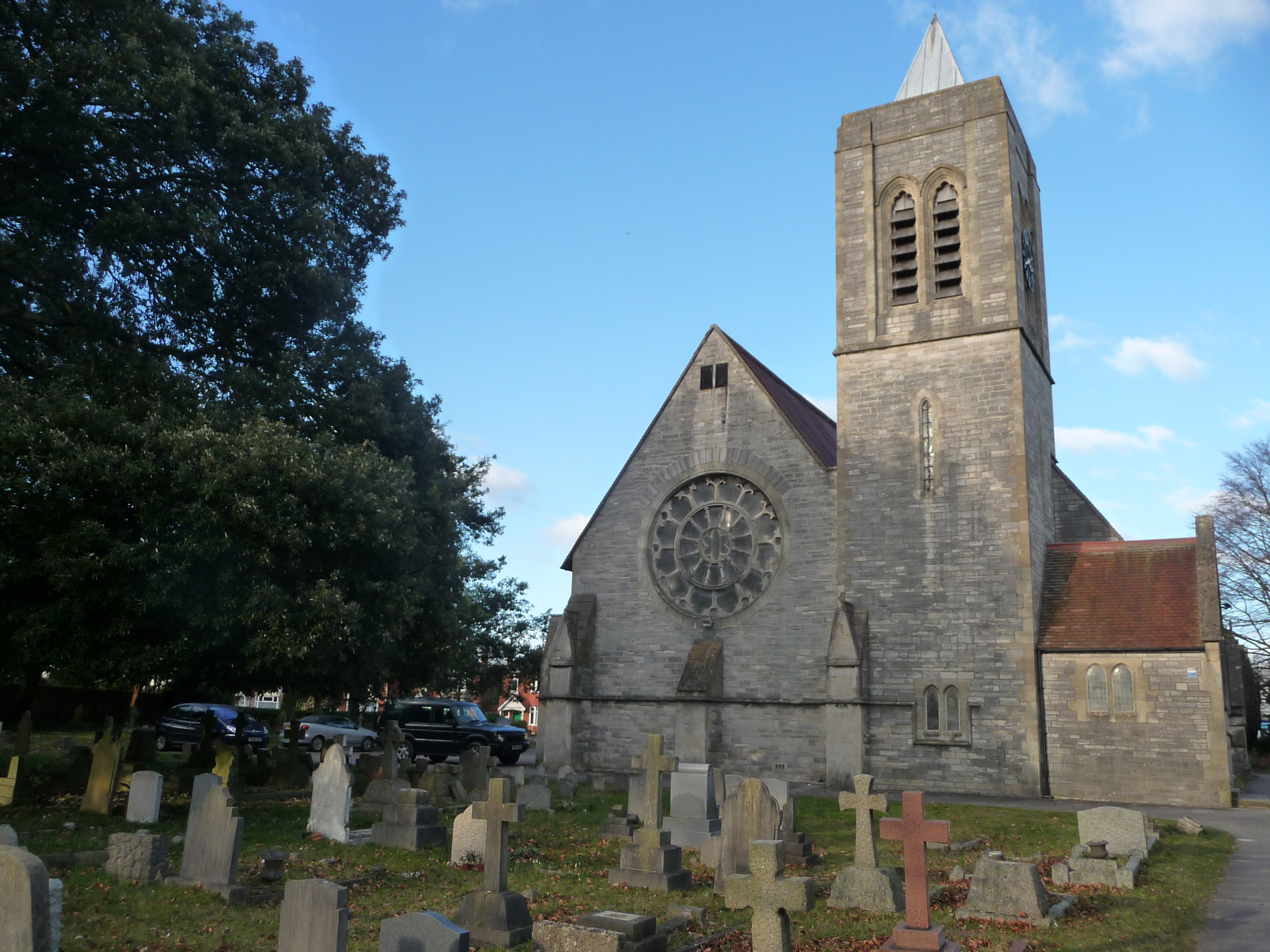
The new St. John's Church at Moordown, completed in 1874.

A school chapel, licensed for church services, was built at Moordown in 1853, with funds raised by parishioners of St. Peter's Church, Bournemouth. Now known as the Old St John's Buildings, it was dedicated to St. John in the Wilderness - quite suitably, for at that point Moordown was still very much a frontier settlement, with a population of about 300. The church moved to its present site in the 1870s, partly in response to the development of Winton at Moordown's southern edge. Winton had been laid out by the Talbot sisters, who, suspicious of religion, decided that no place of worship would be erected on their land. This prompted Alexander Morden Bennett, the zealous vicar of St. Peter's, to move the church to its present site at the junction of Vicarage and Wimborne Roads - right on the border of the Talbot sisters' new development.

Like the old school-chapel, the new church of St John the Baptist's Church was also designed by G. E. Street, and dedicated to St. John; it was consecrated in 1874 (though the present tower was not added until 1923-4). The old-school chapel further north found a laical afterlife as the registered office of a builders' merchant's, Willis Ltd. It survives today as Old St. John's Mews, a housing development at 965 Wimborne Road.

== The Winton Urban District Council ==
The population of Moordown continued to grow, but this did not necessarily result in improved facilities. Most new houses in the district were equipped with wells, but when these dried up in the summer, men took a cart down to the Stour at Muscliff and used tubs to collect river water, which they then sold by the pail to Moordown householders. From 1895 Moordown came under the aegis of the Winton Parish Council, but it was only in 1897, when that council acquired urban powers, that it was in a position to do anything about the water supply. By August 1899 the water shortage was felt to be "a matter of some urgency" and a short-term solution was provided by a Mr. Hunt, who loaned the district council a 244-gallon water tank; he also arranged for a horse and cart to make three daily trips around the Moordown streets. The problem appears to have been resolved when Moordown and Winton were absorbed into the Borough of Bournemouth in 1901.

== 20th-century development ==
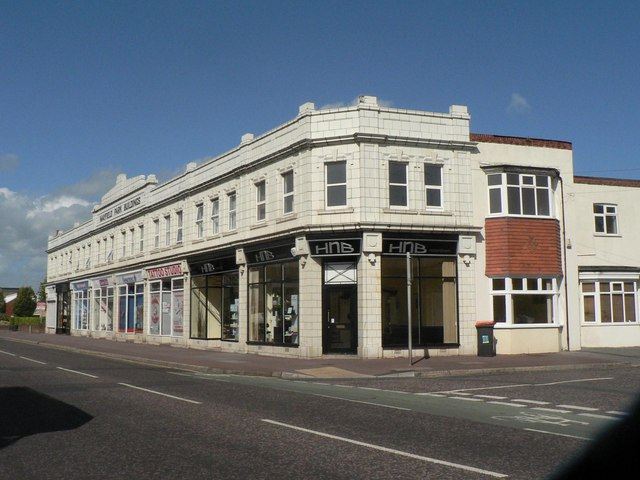
Mayfield Park Buildings, at 929-943 Wimborne Road

The development of Moordown continued with the selling-off of Burt's Farm on the east side of Wimborne Road, around 1911; the result was "the Mayfield Park Estate", whose road names commemorated the coronation of George V (hence King Edward Avenue, King George Avenue and Queen Mary Avenue). That said, Coronation Avenue, laid out in 1912, was not developed for housing until the 1920s, due to the exigencies of the First World War and the subsequent labour shortage. Further land sales resulted in parades of shops at Moordown, including Grand Parade, put up in 1924, and the art deco-style Mayfield Park Buildings, which arrived in 1933. An additional interwar attraction was The Moderne Cinema, which opened in 1935. This doubled up as a venue for children's birthday parties during the Second World War, "and was renowned for being able to lay on jellies even during the height of the rationing". On 22 March 1944, a Royal Air Force Halifax Bomber crashed in Moordown soon after takeoff.

== 21st-century ==
Today, Moordown is a mix of established suburban housing and independent local shops. Postwar shops have included Gerald's Bakery, which sold stale cakes from a kiosk on Saturday mornings (and whose main premises still has village bakery-style windows, on the corner of Ensbury Park Road); "Moggies and Doggies" (pet supplies), set up in 2015 at Mayfield Park Buildings; and The British Bankruptcy Company, which dispensed pre-insolvency advice from 778 Wimborne Road during the 2008 financial crisis. Other shops have included an Arabic barber's, "Jack the Clipper's"; and a draper's at 729 Wimborne Road, which for many years specialized in exotic lingerie, and became known locally as "the naughty knickers shop". This is now a rather more staid dress shop, "Destiny Brides".

== Politics ==
Moordown is part of the Moordown ward for elections to Bournemouth, Christchurch and Poole Council which elect two councillors.

Moordown is part of the Bournemouth East parliamentary constituency, for elections to the House of Commons of the United Kingdom.
