= Queen's Park (Bournemouth ward) =

Electoral ward in Bournemouth, Dorset, England

Boundary of Queen's Park in Bournemouth, Christchurch and Poole.

Queen's Park is a ward in Bournemouth, Dorset. Since 2019, the ward has elected 2 councillors to Bournemouth, Christchurch and Poole Council.

== History ==
The ward formerly elected councillors to Bournemouth Borough Council before it was abolished in 2019.

== Geography ==
Queen's Park ward covers the suburbs of Queen's Park, Malmesbury Park and Richmond Park.

== Councillors ==
One Green Councillor and one Labour Councillor.

== Election results ==
=== 2023 ===
Queen's Park
| Party | Candidate | Votes | % | ±% |
|---|---|---|---|---|
| Green | Alasdair Keddie | 809 | 33.0 | +13.1 |
| Labour | Sharon Lesley Carr-Brown | 808 | 32.9 | +16.3 |
| Conservative | Mark Edward John Anderson‡ | 759 | 30.9 | −14.2 |
| Green | Nicole Nagel | 746 | 30.4 | +15.1 |
| Conservative | Cheryl Anne Johnson‡ | 693 | 28.2 | −10.6 |
| Labour | Christopher Richard Talman | 594 | 24.2 | +9.6 |
| Liberal Democrats | Lorraine Ann Crouch | 215 | 8.8 | −2.2 |
| Liberal Democrats | Gillian Elizabeth Pardy | 170 | 6.9 | −4.5 |
| Majority | | | | |
| Turnout | | 2,455 | 31.69 | |
| Green gain from Conservative | | Swing | | |
| Labour gain from Conservative | | Swing | | |

=== 2019 ===
Queen's Park (2 seats)
| Party | Candidate | Votes | % | ±% |
|---|---|---|---|---|
| Conservative | Mark Anderson | 1,071 | 45.1 | |
| Conservative | Cheryl Johnson | 921 | 38.8 | |
| Green | Alasdair Keddie | 474 | 19.9 | |
| Labour | Sharon Carr-Brown | 395 | 16.6 | |
| Green | Elizabeth McManus | 363 | 15.3 | |
| Labour | Susan Fisher | 346 | 14.6 | |
| UKIP | David Hughes | 299 | 12.6 | |
| Liberal Democrats | Gillian Pardy | 271 | 11.4 | |
| Liberal Democrats | Lorraine Crouch | 261 | 11.0 | |
| Majority | | | | |
| Turnout | | | | |
| Conservative win (new seat) | | | | |
| Conservative win (new seat) | | | | |
