= Queen's Park, Bournemouth =

Park in Bournemouth, Dorset, England

Queen's Park
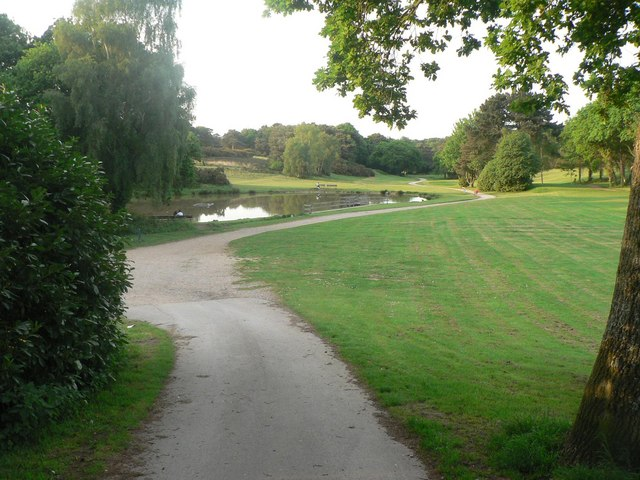
- Interactive map of Queen's Park
- Type: Public park, Golf Course
- Location: Bournemouth, England
- Coordinates: 50°44′25″N 1°50′39″W
- Created: 1902
- Operator: Bournemouth Borough Council
- Status: Open year round

Queen's Park is one of the largest parks that is in Bournemouth, Dorset. It is home to Queen's Park Golf course. Its also name of the suburb the park is in.

== History ==
The coronation of King Edward VII and his Queen, Alexandra of Denmark was scheduled to take place on 26 June 1902. to mark the occasion, Bournemouth Council agreed on 20 May 1902 to rename common No 59 as "King's Park" and common No 60 as "Queen's Park". The coronation was postponed until August when the King suffered an attack of appendicitis on 25 June.

== Politics ==
Queen's Park is part of the Queen's Park ward for elections to Bournemouth, Christchurch and Poole Council which elect two councillors.

Queen's Park is part of the Bournemouth East parliamentary constituency, for elections to the House of Commons of the United Kingdom.
