= St John the Baptist's Church, Moordown =

Church building in Dorset, England

St John the Baptist's Church
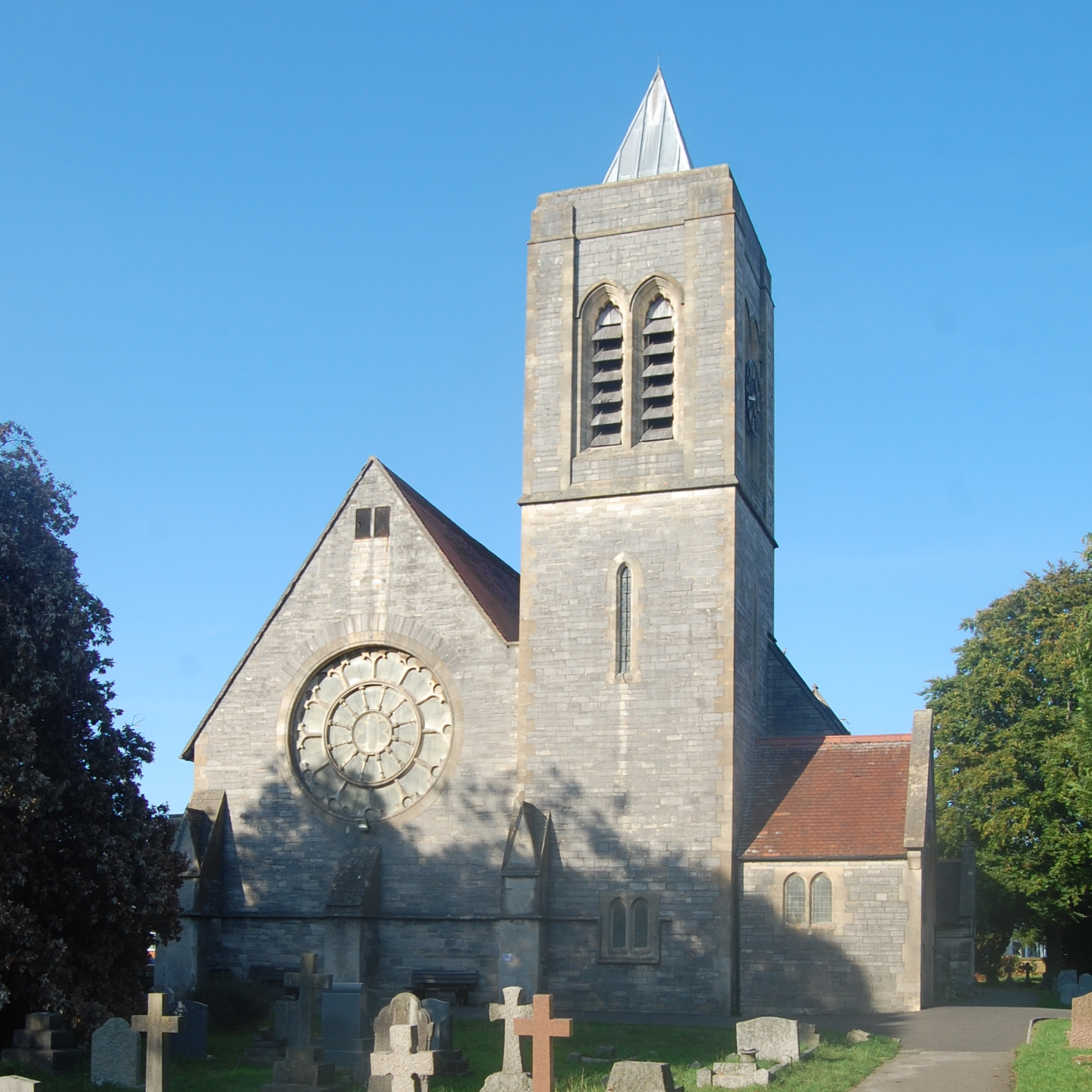
- St John the Baptist's Church in 2022

Religion
- Affiliation: Anglicanism
- Ecclesiastical or organizational status: active

Location
- Location: Wimborne Road, Moordown, Bournemouth, Dorset, England
- Interactive map of St John the Baptist's Church
- Coordinates: 50.74980°N 1.87795°W

Architecture
- Architect: George Edmund Street
- Type: Church
- Style: Gothic Revival architecture
- Completed: 1874

St John the Baptist's Church is a historic church in the Moordown area of Bournemouth, England.

== History ==
The church was designed by GE Street and was completed in 1874.

The church became Grade II listed in 1976.

== See also ==
- List of new churches by G. E. Street
- List of churches in Bournemouth
