= Winton, Dorset =

Suburb of Bournemouth, England

Coordinates: 50.741°N 1.877°W

Winton
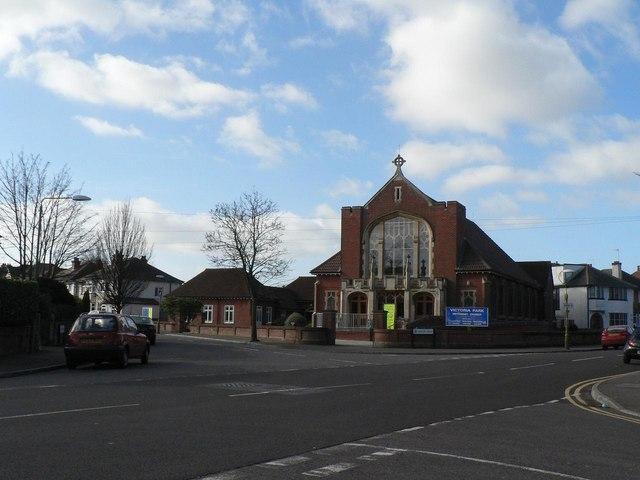

- Location within Dorset
- OS grid reference: SZ085935
- Unitary authority: Bournemouth, Christchurch and Poole
- Ceremonial county: Dorset
- Region: South West
- Country: England
- Sovereign state: United Kingdom
- Post town: Bournemouth
- Postcode district: BH3 and BH9
- Dialling code: 01202
- Police: Dorset
- Fire: Dorset and Wiltshire
- Ambulance: South Western
- UK Parliament: Bournemouth West

Winton is a suburb of Bournemouth, in the Bournemouth, Christchurch and Poole district of Dorset, England. It lies approximately 1 mile (1.6 km) north of Bournemouth town centre, along Wimborne Road (the A347). Winton is to the east of Wallisdown, Victoria Park and Talbot Woods and south of Moordown.

Winton gave its name to Winton, Queensland.

== History ==
The name Winton was derived from Wintoun Castle in Scotland, which was home to Archibald Montgomerie, 13th Earl of Eglinton, a relative of the Talbot family: landowners who started the development of Winton.

At the beginning of the 19th century the area was just rough heathland in the parish of Holdenhurst, with just a track linking ancient Moordown village to Horseshoe Common. In 1805 this all changed when a new main road through Winton was put in and named Muscliff Road (today it is known as Wimborne Road).

Around 1850, wealthy Scottish philanthropists Georgina and Mary Talbot saw the plight of local workers and set about trying to improve their lives by purchasing land along the road and building four artisan cottages and sinking wells to provide fresh water. They founded Talbot Village.

By 1891 the population of Winton had reached 4,000, and by 1901 it was 6,719. In 1901, it became part of the enlarged county borough of Bournemouth.

== Governance ==
Winton is part of two wards for elections to Bournemouth, Christchurch and Poole Council; Winton East and Wallisdown and Winton West.

Historically, Winton was in the parish of Holdenhurst in Hampshire. On 31 December 1894, Winton became a separate civil parish, and in 1897 it became a short-lived urban district. In 1901, the district was merged into Bournemouth, which was by then a county borough administratively separate from the county. On 30 September 1902, the parish was also abolished and merged with Bournemouth parish. In 1974, Bournemouth became a district of Dorset. Winton is now in the unparished area of Bournemouth.

== Landmarks ==
The area has several striking buildings, such as Saint Luke's Church, the old fire station on Peter's Hill, the Edwardian Carnegie library in Wimborne Road, and what was the art-deco Moderne Cinema building, now known as the Lifecentre, having undergone a complete refurbishment maintaining the art-deco theme.

=== Winton Recreation Ground ===
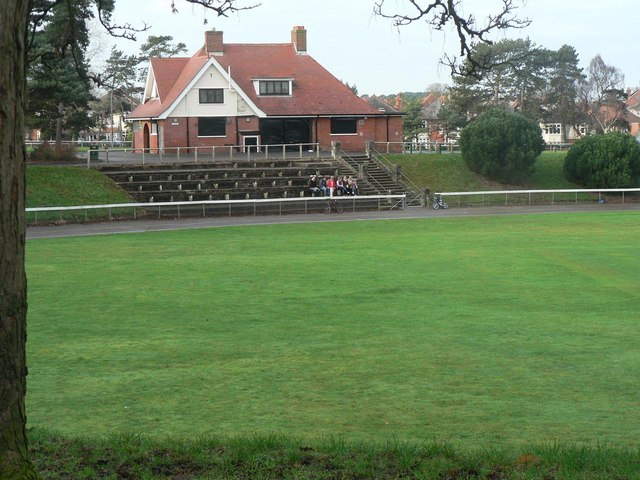
Winton Rec pavilion

Winton Recreation Ground is the only significant green space in an area of approximately one square mile, serving a population of 4,750 people.

The idea of creating a public recreation facility for Winton was first envisaged in 1902. The Earl of Malmesbury gave nearly six hectares of suitable land to Bournemouth Borough Council in 1904. The official opening of Winton Recreation Ground took place in September 1906.

The facilities available at the ground include Richmond Park Bowls Club, tennis courts, cycle track, children's playground, playgroups play building and a cricket pitch.

The cricket pavilion is over 90 years old. It was extended in 1962 and refurbished in 1999.

=== Winton Banks ===
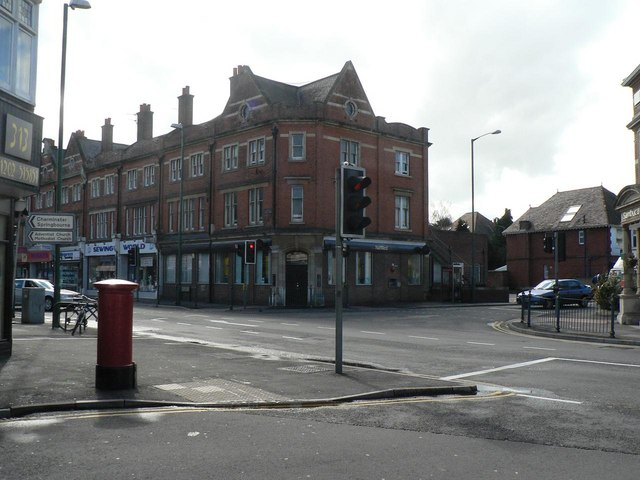
Winton Banks

This busy road junction in Winton is called Winton Banks because several banks that used to surround this junction. Currently, Lloyds Bank and Santander are the last of the banks surrounding this junction after the closure of NatWest Winton in October 2017.

=== Continental Cinema ===
Opened in 1911, the Continental Cinema started life as the Winton Hall and was renamed Winton Electric Picture House the following year. In 1930 it was modernised and renamed Plaza, becoming the first cinema in Bournemouth to show talking pictures. After the war years it was again refurbished and renamed the Continental. In 1978 it changed hands but the cinema took a downturn in the 1980s due to lack of maintenance and it ended its life in 1989 when it was demolished to build a pub.

=== Peter's Hill ===
The steep rise in Wimborne Road to the north of Kemp and Wycliffe roads, has been known locally for many years as Peter's Hill, with several stories circulating as to the origin of the name, the least fanciful would seem to be that the spire of Saint Peter's Church in Bournemouth could be glimpsed from the top of the hill. Evidence of the name dates to 1871, soon after Winton was formed, when Henry Vatcher a carter living with his wife two children and two lodgers, gives Peter's Hill as his address on the census.

=== Winton Library ===
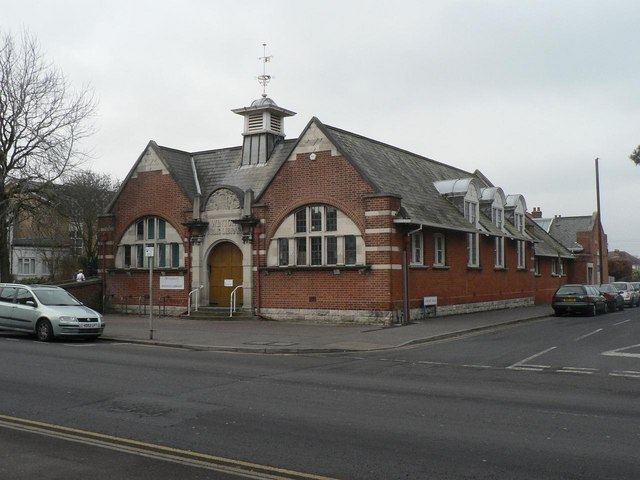
Winton library

Winton library was opened in 1907 and became Bournemouth's first permanent purpose-built library. It was built on land provided by landowner Lord Leven with financial support from Scottish-American philanthropist Andrew Carnegie. It was one of the first public libraries in the country to allow open access to the shelves; and it was here that Flora Thompson read the literature on which she based her literary career culminating in her autobiographical trilogy Lark Rise to Candleford.

The library has undergone a number of refurbishments during its lifetime, the most recent in 2006 when a computer suite was added.
