= Neville Heath =

English murderer

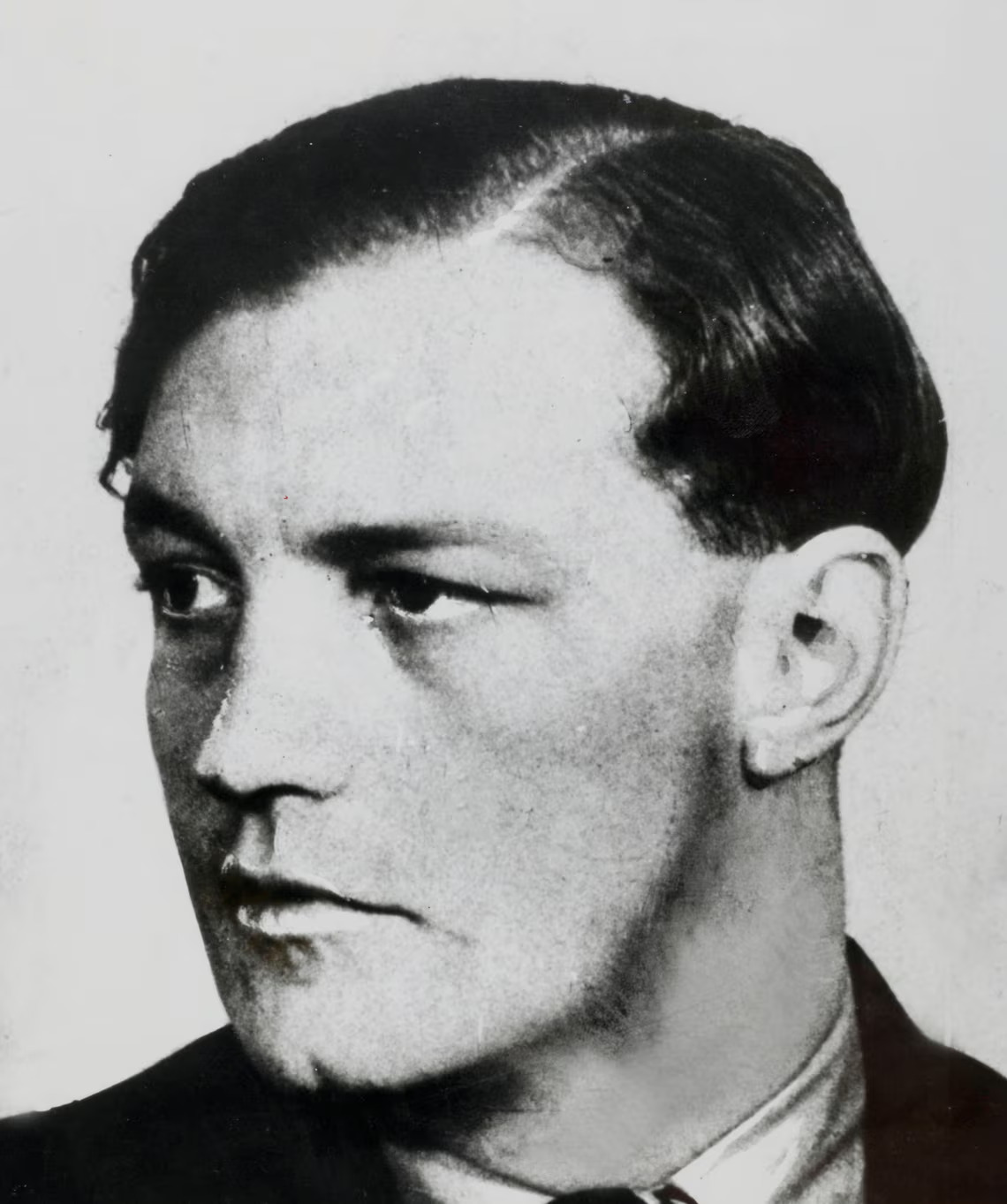
- Heath in a June 1946 publication
- Born: 6 June 1917; Ilford, Essex, England
- Died: 16 October 1946 (aged 29); Pentonville Prison, London, England
- Other name: The Lady Killer
- Status: Executed by hanging
- Conviction: Murder
- Penalty: Death

Details
- Victims: 2
- Span of crimes: 20 June 1946 – 3 July 1946
- Country: England
- Date apprehended: 6 July 1946

Neville George Clevely Heath (6 June 1917 – 16 October 1946) was an English murderer who killed two young women in the summer of 1946. He was executed in Pentonville Prison, London, in October 1946.

== Early life and career ==
Neville Heath was born in Ilford, Essex. Although he came from a lower middle class background, his father, who was a barber, made considerable financial sacrifices so that his son could attend Rutlish School, a prestigious grammar school in Merton Park, London.

Heath was commissioned into the Royal Air Force (RAF) in February 1936, but was dismissed on 20 September 1937 for going absent without leave. He was later caught obtaining credit by fraud, and six months later was sent to a borstal for housebreaking and forgery. Heath used a number of aliases, including Lord Dudley and Lieutenant-Colonel Armstrong.

At the beginning of the Second World War, Heath joined the Royal Army Service Corps (RASC) as a driver, was commissioned in March 1940 and was posted to the Middle East. After less than a year, having been promoted to lieutenant, he was cashiered by court martial and shipped home, but escaped the guard during the journey and went to Johannesburg. There he joined the South African Air Force (SAAF), eventually rising to the rank of captain. Heath married and had a son, but at the end of the war his wife divorced him on grounds of desertion. He was also court martialled for wearing medals to which he was not entitled.

Heath returned to Britain in February 1946. Several months later, in the midst of his murder spree, he had a dinner date with the South African actress Moira Lister. Scottish actress Molly Weir later reported that Heath had tried to chat her up at a department store in Bournemouth in July 1946.

== Murders ==
On Sunday 16 June 1946, Heath took a room at the Pembridge Court Hotel in Notting Hill Gate in London. He used his real name but added the rank of lieutenant-colonel. He was accompanied by a woman, Yvonne Symonds, who he said was his wife; in fact they had only just met. Heath had promised to marry Symonds, so she spent the night with him and returned home the next day.

=== Margery Gardner ===
On 20 June 1946, Heath spent the evening with Margery Gardner (32), a trained artist and occasional film extra. Separated from her alcoholic husband, Gardner had a young daughter but was living alone in Earl's Court. Heath and Gardner had been dancing together at the Panama Club in Kensington. The following day, the assistant manager at the Pembridge Court Hotel entered Heath's room after the chambermaid had been unable to gain entry. Gardner's body was found naked on the bed but covered to the neck with sheets. Her ankles were bound and marks showed that her wrists had been as well but the restraints had been removed. There were seventeen lash marks on her body, her nipples had been savagely bitten and an instrument had been inserted into her vagina.

The slash marks on Gardner's body showed the distinctive diamond pattern of a woven leather riding crop, but the weapon was not found at the scene. Forensic pathologist Keith Simpson told police, "Find that whip and you’ve found your man." Simpson estimated Gardner's time of death as between midnight and the early hours of the morning. Police learned that Heath and Gardner had arrived at the hotel around midnight and that nothing had been heard until a door slammed at 1:30am. The cause of death was suffocation, but only after the other injuries had been inflicted.

=== Doreen Marshall ===
Heath went to Worthing and spent a few days with Symonds. Her parents were impressed with the supposed lieutenant-colonel, but he left when his name appeared in the newspapers in relation to Gardner's murder. He then went to Bournemouth and took a room at the Tollard Royal Hotel under the name "Group Captain Rupert Brook", an alias inspired by the war poet Rupert Brooke. A few days after beginning his stay at the hotel, he met Doreen Margaret Marshall, who was staying at the Norfolk Hotel.

Marshall was born in Brentford in 1924, to company director Charles Marshall and his wife Grace Merritt. She had served in the Women's Royal Naval Service (WRNS) during the war and had been discharged on 27 June 1946. Suffering from a bout of influenza and measles, she took a holiday in Bournemouth to convalesce.

During the war, Bournemouth had become a garrison town, with most of the hotels taken over as billets for British troops. The Norfolk Hotel, located on Richmond Hill near the town centre, remained open to civilian guests. Only five minutes from the hotel was the seafront, where 100-foot (30 m) sandy cliffs framed the beach and were held back by a low sea wall with a promenade. Whilst walking along the promenade on 3 July, Marshall encountered Heath, who again introduced himself as Group Captain Rupert Brook.

Initially impressed with Heath's looks and manner, Marshall accepted his invitation to take afternoon tea at the Tollard Royal Hotel, where he was staying. Marshall spent the afternoon with Heath and, feeling lonely in Bournemouth, she accepted his further invitation to dine with him that evening. After dinner, Heath took Marshall to the hotel lounge to listen to dance music on the wireless. By now, Marshall was clearly uncomfortable with Heath and asked another guest to call a taxi for her, claiming she was tired. Heath cancelled the taxi and offered to walk her home. On leaving the hotel, Heath told the porter that he would be half an hour; Marshall corrected him: "He will only be a quarter of an hour." This was the last time Marshall was seen alive.

Marshall's disappearance was reported to police by the manager of the Norfolk Hotel on 5 July. He also contacted the manager of the Tollard Royal, knowing that she had dined there on the night she disappeared. The manager of the Tollard Royal advised Heath to contact police in case he had any information which might help them. The following day, Heath duly telephoned Detective Constable Suter at Bournemouth police station and offered to help. He went to the police station and from a photograph identified Marshall as the woman he had been with, but claimed he had left her in the gardens in central Bournemouth.

Later that day, Marshall's father and sister, Charles Marshall and Joan Cruickshanks, arrived at Bournemouth police station and by chance met Heath under his assumed name, who was introduced by Suter. "Brook" joked to them about his similarity to the wanted poster of the murderer Neville Heath. Suter felt sure that he was the man wanted by Scotland Yard, asking, "Isn't your name Heath?" Heath denied it and said he wanted to return to the hotel for his coat. The police fetched it for him and searched it, finding a railway cloakroom ticket, which in turn led them to a suitcase containing a riding whip with a diamond pattern weave. Under questioning, Heath admitted his real identity. The next day he was transferred to London, where he was charged with the murder of Margery Gardner.

Marshall's whereabouts remained a mystery until 7 July, when waitress Kathleen Evans, out walking her dog, noticed a swarm of flies by a rhododendron thicket in Branksome Dene Chine. Further investigation revealed Marshall's naked body, badly mutilated. Wounds found on her hands suggested she had grasped defensively at a knife. She had received blows to her head, her wrists and ankles had been tied, one nipple had been bitten off, and her throat had been slashed. As with Gardner an instrument, possibly a branch, had been inserted into her vagina. She also had a large gash that ran from the inside of her thigh up to her mutilated breast. Some of her possessions were found at the beach huts at Alum Chine.

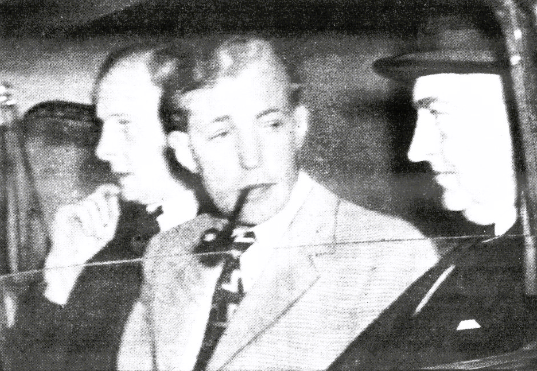
Heath (centre), pictured en route to HM Prison Brixton prior to trial

Although Heath was charged with Marshall's murder, his subsequent trial and execution related only to his earlier murder of Gardner. Marshall's body was returned to her parents and buried in Pinner Cemetery.

== Trial and execution ==
Heath's trial began on 24 September 1946. Heath originally told his counsel, J. D. Casswell KC, to plead guilty, but when Casswell questioned this, he said, "All right, put me down as not guilty, old boy". Casswell chose not to call Heath to give evidence and relied on the defence of insanity, calling William Henry de Bargue Hubert, an experienced criminal psychiatrist, to testify as an expert witness. Hubert testified that he believed Heath knew what he was doing but not that it was morally wrong, but the prosecution easily destroyed Hubert's argument; unknown to Casswell, Hubert was a drug addict and was under the influence of morphine as he testified in the witness box.

Two prison doctors testified that although Heath was a psychopath and a sexual sadist, he was not insane. He was found guilty and sentenced to death by hanging by Mr Justice Morris. Heath was executed by Albert Pierrepoint on 16 October 1946 at Pentonville Prison. A few minutes prior to his execution, as was the custom, he was offered a glass of whisky by the prison governor. Heath replied, "While you're about it, sir, you might make that a double".

In a final letter written to his parents prior to his execution, Heath informed his parents: "My only regret at leaving the world, is that I have been damned unworthy of you both."

=== Mistaken identity ===
In February 1946, a few months before the murders, a woman named Pauline Brees was found naked and tied up in a room at the Strand Palace Hotel in London. Heath stood over the woman, ready to thrash her. Hotel staff had been alerted by her screaming and forced entry to the room, but she subsequently refused to press charges against Heath in order to avoid publicity. When Gardner's body was found in June, Gardner was mistakenly identified by the staff at the Strand Palace as having been involved in this incident in February.

This identification was reported in the press at the time as fact, suggesting that Gardner had gone to the Pembridge Court Hotel fully aware of Heath's sexual proclivities and that she, therefore, must have had some sort of masochistic tendency. Despite the assumptions of many studies of the case to date, there is little actual evidence for this. Producer Sean O'Connor suggests that Heath barely knew Margery Gardner, and that they had never spent the night together before the night he killed her.

== References in media ==
- In Handsome Brute: The Story of a Ladykiller (2013), Sean O'Connor examines previously restricted files from the Home Office and Metropolitan Police.
- Heath inspired the character played by Dennis Price in the film Holiday Camp (1947).
- Heath's case has been suggested as the basis for three novels by Patrick Hamilton: The West Pier, Mr Stimpson & Mr Gorse and Unknown Assailant.
- Barry Foster said that Heath was the inspiration for his portrayal of Robert Rusk in Alfred Hitchcock's 1972 film Frenzy; Hitchcock gave him two books written on Heath to read as background for the character. The unproduced Hitchcock project Kaleidoscope which predated Frenzy had been inspired by Heath.
- The lead role of a murderer in the film Eyewitness was a change of pace for actor Donald Sinden, who did extensive research for the part, modelling his performance on Heath.
- The story featured in the 'Neville Heath' episode of the 1949-51 Radio series Secrets of Scotland Yard
- Heath was portrayed by Ian Charleson in an episode of the 1981 murder-trial reenactment series Ladykillers.
- Heath is featured in the first episode of season three of the comedy drama Shine On Harvey Moon, in which "Squadron Leader" Rupert Brook invites Rita Moon to spend the weekend with him in Bournemouth. She accepts but stands him up when Lou Louis is taken ill - Heath sets off for Bournemouth alone, in a bad temper.
