= Bournemouth Blitz =

German bombing raids on Bournemouth, England during WWII

- Part of the Strategic bombing campaign of World War II
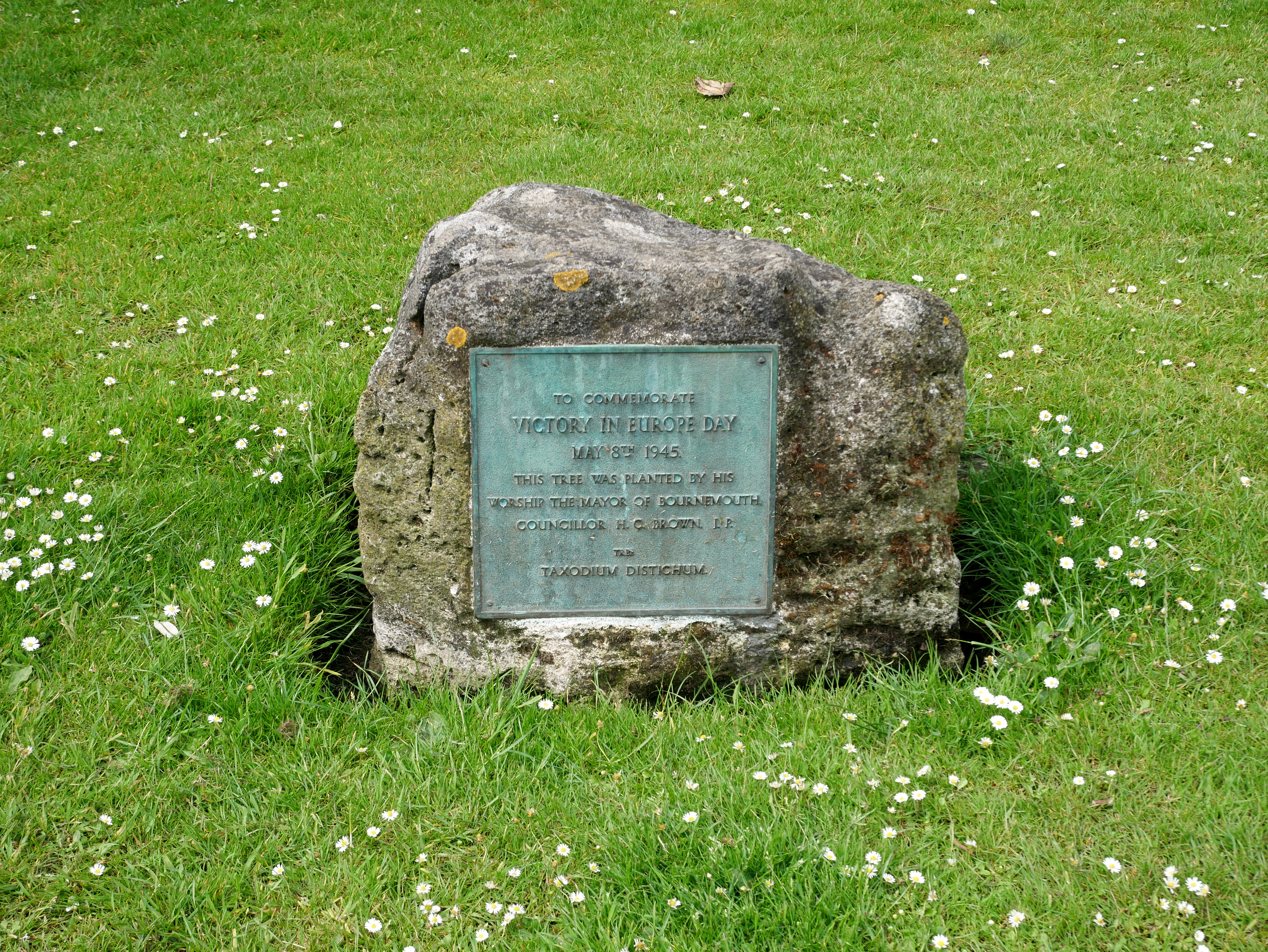
- VE Day Memorial Stone in Bournemouth Gardens
Date	1940 to 1944
Location	Bournemouth, Hampshire (now Dorset), England

The Bournemouth Blitz was the heavy bombing of Bournemouth, Hampshire (but now in Dorset), England from 1940 to 1944, by the Nazi German Luftwaffe during the Second World War.

Bournemouth suffered a total of 51 raids, the first on 2nd July 1940 and the last on 24th April 1944. More than 2,200 bombs fell on Bournemouth and Poole during World War II, and 350 civilians and servicemen were killed.

== Events ==
=== 1940 ===
Robert Louis Stevenson's house Skerryvore, at the head of Alum Chine, was severely damaged by bombs during a destructive and lethal raid on the night of 15–16 November 1940. Despite a campaign to save it, the building was demolished.

=== 1941 ===
On 27 March 1941, a lone German bomber hit the canteen at the Bourne Valley gasworks killing 33 people. This was the deadliest air raid that Poole suffered.

=== 1943 ===
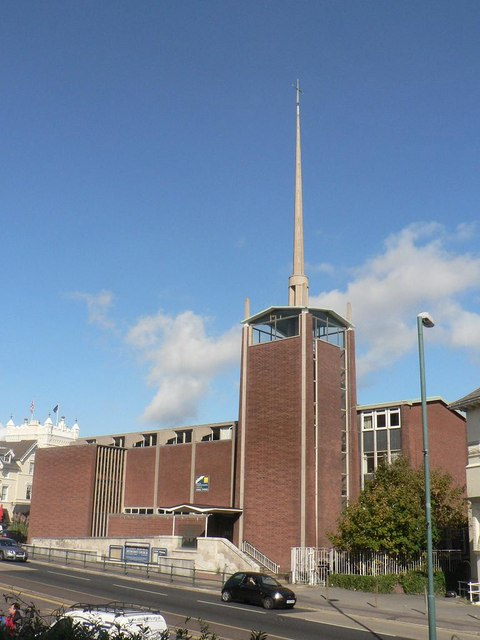
The Punshon Memorial Methodist Church was built in replacement of the destroyed church.

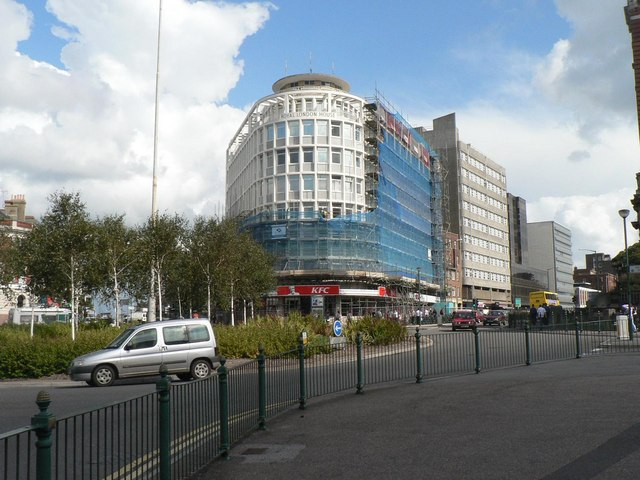
Royal London House stands where the Metropole Hotel once stood.

The biggest air raid was on 23 May 1943 in which many Focke-Wulf 190 planes dropped 25 bombs on the town.

The buildings targeted that day included the Central Hotel at Richmond Hill; the Shamrock and Rambler coach station at Holdenhurst Road and Beales department store. The Methodist church on Exeter Road was destroyed and 77 people were killed.

The biggest loss was the Metropole Hotel in Lansdowne, where many Allied servicemen were staying. 22 Commonwealth airmen (mostly Canadian and Australian), and approximately 110 civilians were killed. The hotel was demolished in 1955.

Across Bournemouth Town Centre twenty-two buildings were destroyed and 3,354 were damaged.

== Legacy ==
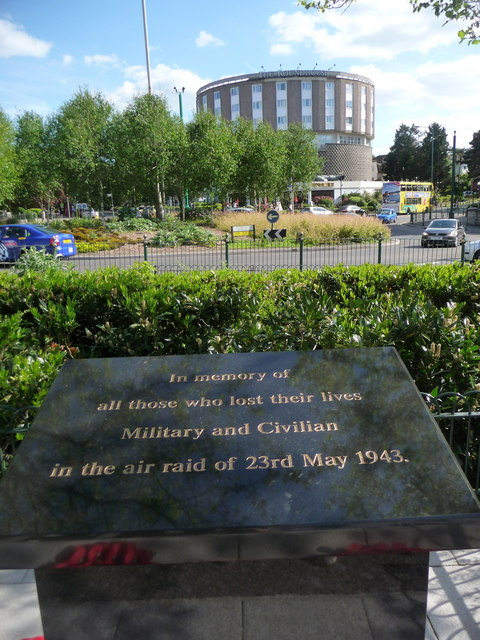
The Bournemouth Metropole memorial in Lansdowne.

In 2013, a memorial was unveiled on the 70th anniversary of 23rd May 1943 air raid.
