= List of disasters in Maryland by death toll =

This is a list of disasters that have occurred in Maryland organized by death toll. Historically documented events that caused 10 or more deaths are included.

== List ==
Notes:

- Acts of war are excluded, such as battles in Maryland.
- Some of the events occurred in the Atlantic Ocean, at varying distances from land.

Year	Event	Type	Death toll	Location	Sources
2020	COVID-19 pandemic	Disease	15,575	statewide	
1918	Spanish flu pandemic	Disease	5,160	statewide	
1963	Pan Am Flight 214	Explosion	81	Elkton	
1883	Tivoli pier collapse	Drowning	63	Sparrows Point	
1865	Collision of the S.S. Massachusetts and the barge Black Diamond	Ship collision	60	St. Clement's Island	
1947	Eastern Air Lines Flight 605	Aviation accident	53	Bainbridge	
1868	1868 Jones Falls Flood	Flood	50	Baltimore and Ellicott City	
1954	USN Flight 57	Plane disappearance	42	Ocean City	
1913	Alum Chine explosion	Explosion	33	Baltimore	
1958	Capital Airlines Flight 75	Aviation accident	31	Chase	
1854	Ruxton-Riderwood train collision	Train collision	30–35	Ruxton-Riderwood	
1895	Front Street Theater disaster	Crowd crush	26	Baltimore	
1905	Patapsco train collision	Train collision	26	Patapsco	
1837	1837 Jones Falls Flood	Flood	24	Baltimore	
1842	Medora Steamboat Explosion	Explosion and Shipwreck	23	Baltimore	
1981	United States Air Force EC-135 explosion	Explosion	21	Walkersville	
1926	S. S. Mantilla explosion	Explosion	18	Sparrows Point	
1954	Fairchild C-119F-FA Flying Boxcar crash	Aviation accident	18	Lothian	
1861	1861 Baltimore riot	Riot	17	Baltimore	
1926	1926 La Plata Tornado	Fire	17	La Plata	
1962	United Air Lines Flight 297	Bird strike	17	Ellicott City	
1987	1987 Maryland train collision	Train collision	16	Chase	
1857	Warehouses fire	Fire	15	Baltimore	
1943	Triumph Explosives plant explosion	Explosion	15	Elkton	
1935	Williamsport High School bus crash	Train–bus collision	14	Rockville	
1942	Ambassador/Cleveland Express collision	Train collision	14	Dickerson	
1945	1945 Edgewood Arsenal explosion	Explosion	12	Edgewood	
1958	Capital Airlines Flight 300/Lockheed T-33 collision	Mid-air collision	12	Brunswick	
1888	F–2 Tornado	Tornado	11	Kent County	
1954	Kent Defense Industries explosion	Explosion	11	Chestertown	
1978	USCGC Cuyahoga / M/V Santa Cruz II collision	Collision	11	Chesapeake Bay	
1996	1996 Maryland train collision	Train collision	11	Silver Spring	
1924	S. S. Three Rivers fire	Fire	10	Chesapeake Bay	
1938	Tunnel explosion	Explosion	10	Baltimore	
1954	Traffic collision	Traffic collision	10	North Beach	
1956	Oyster Roast Fire	Fire	10	Baltimore	
1982	Row house fire	Fire	10	Baltimore	

== See also ==
- List of accidents and disasters by death toll
- List of natural disasters by death toll
- List of disasters in Maine by death toll
- List of disasters in Massachusetts by death toll
- List of disasters in New Hampshire by death toll
- List of disasters in the United States by death toll
