= Durley Chine =

Beach in Bournemouth, England

Coordinates: 50°42′48″N 1°53′21″W

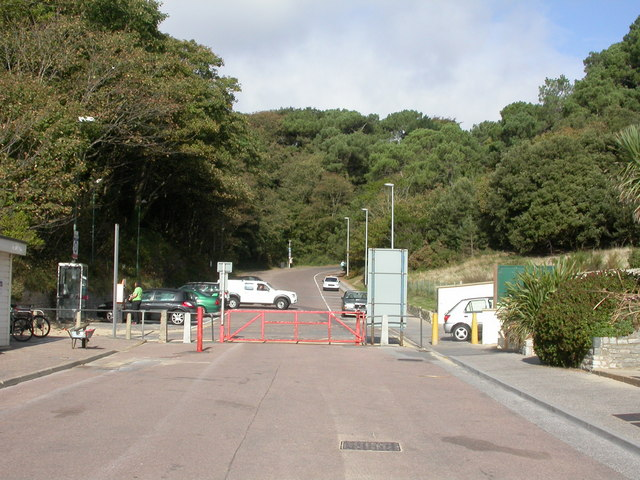
The beachside car park in Durley Chine.

Durley Chine is a Blue Flag beach and chine in Bournemouth, Dorset in England. It is to the west of Bournemouth Town Centre, near West Cliff, and east of Westbourne.

== Landscape ==
On clear days views of the Isle of Wight and Old Harry Rocks can be seen. Durley Chine gives its name to the Durley Dean Hotel.

== Facilities ==
Along the beach there are beach huts and a Harvester, known as the Durley Inn.

In 2024, the Durley Chine Environmental Hub was constructed by Canadian firm WSP Global.

== Politics ==
Durley Chine is part of the Bournemouth West parliamentary constituency.
