= Tony Silvestri =

Tony Silvestri is the name of:

- Charles Anthony Silvestri (born 1965), American lyricist, poet and historian
- Tony Silvestri, former owner of Bournemouth, England, music venue The Downstairs Club
- Tony Silvestri, member of 2000s team Boston Storm (inline hockey)
- Tony Silvestri, "Touring musician" playing piano, acoustic guitar (2015–2016) with Canadian rock band The Glorious Sons
