= Bournemouth Daily Echo =

Daily newspaper published in Bournemouth

- Type: Daily newspaper
- Owner: USA Today Co.
- Publisher: Newsquest
- Founded: 1900
- Language: English
- Headquarters: Bournemouth, Dorset, England
- Circulation: 4,761 (as of 2024)
- Sister newspapers: Southern Daily Echo (Southampton); Dorset Echo (Weymouth)
- ISSN: 1368-3837
- Website: www.bournemouthecho.co.uk

The Bournemouth Daily Echo, commonly known as the Daily Echo (a.k.a. the Bournemouth Echo), is a local newspaper that covers the area of southeast Dorset, England, including the towns Poole, Bournemouth and Christchurch. Published by Newsquest (Southern) Limited, issues appear Monday to Saturday, and has an average daily circulation of 9,589 in January to June 2020.

== History ==
The newspaper was first published on 20 August 1900, and the centenary of the paper was celebrated in Echoes of the Century, a book published by the Daily Echo in 2000 that chronicles the history and reportage of a century. Since 1932, the newspaper has been based out of the Bournemouth Daily Echo building in the Richmond Hill area of Bournemouth Town Centre.

In October 2006, the EDF Energy London and South of England Media Awards awarded The Daily Echo the title of Daily Newspaper of the Year. In the same competition, the paper also won Columnist of the Year and Environmental Journalist of the Year for the work of Faith Eckersall and Natalie Bruckner respectively.

The paper was involved in reporting the Tesco bomb campaign, an attempted extortion against Tesco stores in the Bournemouth area in 2000–01. It carried classified adverts on behalf of the police, which allowed them to communicate with the perpetrator. This resulted in arrest of Robert Dyer.

A notable journalist who worked for the Bournemouth Evening Echo in the late 1970s was the writer Bill Bryson.
