= USS Jason (AC-12) =

Collier of the United States Navy

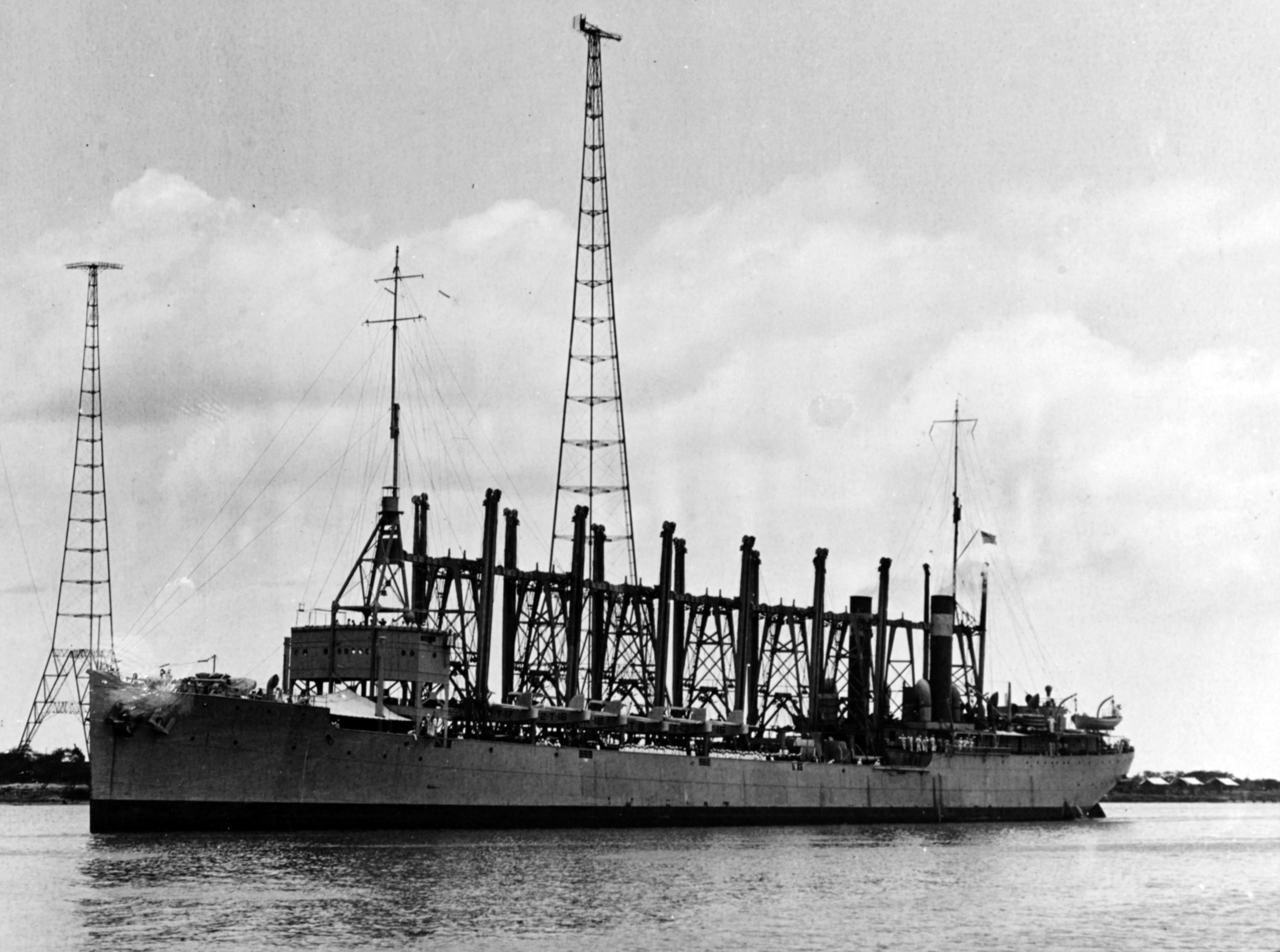

History

United States
- Name: USS Jason (AC-12)
- Namesake: Jason
- Ordered: August 1911
- Builder: Maryland Steel Company
- Laid down: 26 March 1912
- Launched: 16 November 1912
- Commissioned: 26 June 1913
- Decommissioned: 30 June 1932
- Stricken: 19 May 1936
- Fate: Sold into mercantile service 29 July 1936; sold for scrapping Baltimore, Maryland 1948

General characteristics
- Displacement: 19,250 Tons
- Length: 536 ft (163 m)
- Beam: 65 ft (20 m)
- Draft: 27 ft 8 in (8.43 m)
- Propulsion: Coal-fueled vertical triple-expansion steam engines, two screws
- Speed: 14.32 k
- Complement: 82
- Armament: 4 × 4 inch/50
- Aircraft carried: Up to 12 aircraft as a depot ship, or up to 24 as an aviation transport

USS Jason (AC-12/AV-2) was a collier in service with the United States Navy from 1913 to 1932. She was then sold into commercial service and served as SS Jason until she was scrapped in 1948.

== History ==
USS Jason was laid down 26 March 1912 and launched 16 November 1912 by Maryland Steel Company, Sparrows Point, Maryland.

On the morning of 7 March 1913 in Baltimore harbor, 300 tons of dynamite bound for use in constructing the Panama Canal was being loaded onto the British iron steamer Alum Chine from an adjacent car float when it detonated, completely annihilating both vessels. Jason, about 1,100 feet away and newly ready for sea trials, was blasted by the debris and showered with iron, timber and boxes of dynamite, some of which exploded on impact. At least three on Jason were killed, and many more wounded. The ship's master at the time, Capt. J. R. Thompson, on deck making preparations to leave, was knocked head over heels and nearly blown overboard. Jason's hull and plating, three-quarters to seven-eighths of an inch thick, was riddled with holes from the water line to the top of the smoke stacks, which were mashed almost flat by the force of the explosion. Jason was so badly battered by the explosion she required extensive repairs before she would be accepted by the Navy. As a result, she was not commissioned until 26 June 1913.

During Woodrow Wilson's first administration, Mexico was torn by revolution and several factions struggled to attain undisputed control of the land. Jason sailed for the troubled area 4 September 1913 to fuel American ships stationed there. She returned to Norfolk 13 October to prepare for fueling operations in the Mediterranean.

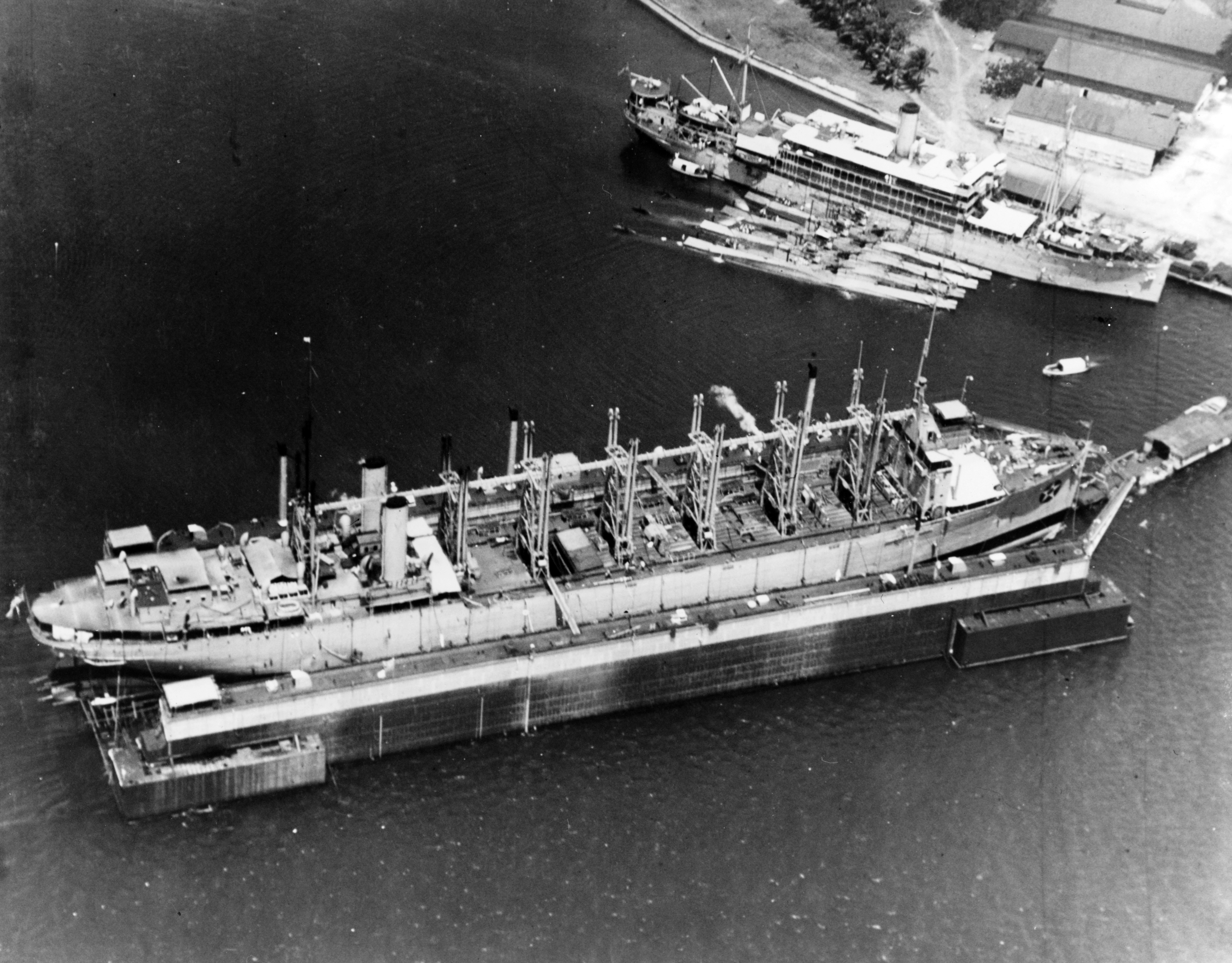
Jason in dry dock USS Dewey in 1932.

Jason departed Norfolk 25 October, fueled ships off Italy and France, and returned to Hampton Roads, Virginia, 18 December. Following further fueling duties during winter maneuvers in the Caribbean and Mexican waters in early 1914, she embarked refugees from Tuxpan, Mexico, in April and transported them to Louisiana. Later that year, Jason was once again involved in a humanitarian gesture as she sailed from New York 14 November, bearing Christmas gifts for the Mediterranean fleet and the people of Europe. The "Christmas Ship," as she was called, returned to Norfolk 15 March 1915.

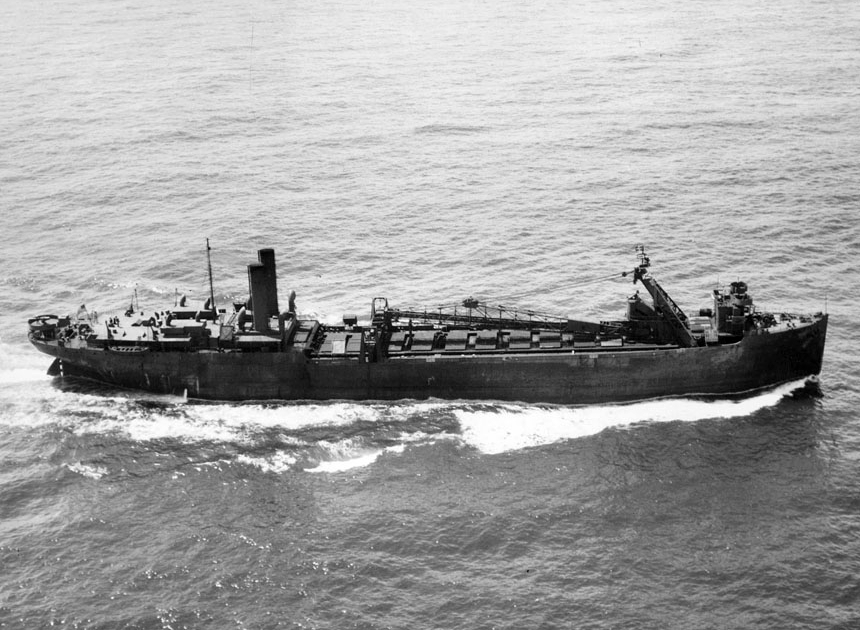
Ex-USS Jason in merchant service, 26 May 1943.

For the next two years Jason continued fueling operations, including one cruise to the West Coast March–June 1915. During the early months of the war she operated with the Atlantic Train, transporting coal, stores, and freight along the eastern United States. She continued these duties until 16 April 1918 when she arrived New York to load aviation materials for transportation to Inverness, Scotland. Upon her return to Hampton Roads 5 July, Jason was assigned to NOTS to transport coal along the East Coast.

After the war the fuel ship made two cruises to Europe with coal and general cargo before being detached from NOTS 22 July 1919. Jason sailed from Norfolk 31 July to join the Pacific Train (having been reclassified AC12 on 17 July 1920). Six months later she returned to the East Coast and 21 September 1920 sailed with coal and stores for the ships in European waters. Upon returning to the United States, she loaded airplanes and artillery equipment and departed Philadelphia 24 January 1921 for Guam.

Jason operated in the Pacific for two years performing fueling operations along the coast. During 1923 she cruised to Nicaragua, embarked Marines stationed there, and returned them to Norfolk. She arrived San Diego 5 May and resumed transport and fueling services until 1925. She also transported a load of Douglas DT-2 torpedo bomber floatplanes to Pearl Harbor during July 1923.

Jason departed Pearl Harbor 2 May 1925 for service with the air squadron in the Far East as the official depot ship for the aircraft of the Asiatic Fleet, since the naval treaties forbade basing aircraft ashore in the Philippines. After arriving in the Philippines 25 May, she carried Marines to China to protect American interests. From 1925 to 1932 Jason operated in the Far East, engaging in transport duties and acting as a floating base supporting the Asiatic Fleet's air squadron. As an aside, the 1922 Washington Treaty and the associated Four-Power Treaty forbade the establishment of permanent air facilities ashore in the Philippines, and Jason was assigned to replace Ajax as the depot ship in the Philippines for American naval aviation in the islands, basing the six SC-2 (and the later T3M-2) seaplane torpedo bombers of VT-5A (originally established as VT-20) and the six O2U-1 seaplane scouts of VS-8A (Asiatic Fleet detachments).

Peace in China was constantly jeopardized by warlike factions within and aggression from without. Jason and the other members of the Asiatic Fleet kept the situation in hand by making the presence of America's naval strength felt. Jason was reclassified as a seaplane tender AV-2 on 21 January 1930. She returned to San Diego 13 May 1932, and was decommissioned at Bremerton Navy Yard 30 June 1932. Jason was struck from the Navy List 19 May 1936 and sold 29 July of that year. Towed by the tug SS Roosevelt, built for Robert Peary′s polar explorations, she left Seattle on 31 October 1936 bound for New York City. This proved to be the last trip of the badly deteriorating Roosevelt which suffered from heavy seas and several failures. Another tugboat replaced it at Cristóbal in January 1937 and it was then beached and abandoned near the Old French Canal.

=== Decommissioning and fate ===
Jason was then converted to a commercial bulk carrier and was scrapped in 1948.
