= Durley Dean Hotel =

Hotel in Bournemouth, Dorset, England

Coordinates: 50.716138°N 1.887868°W

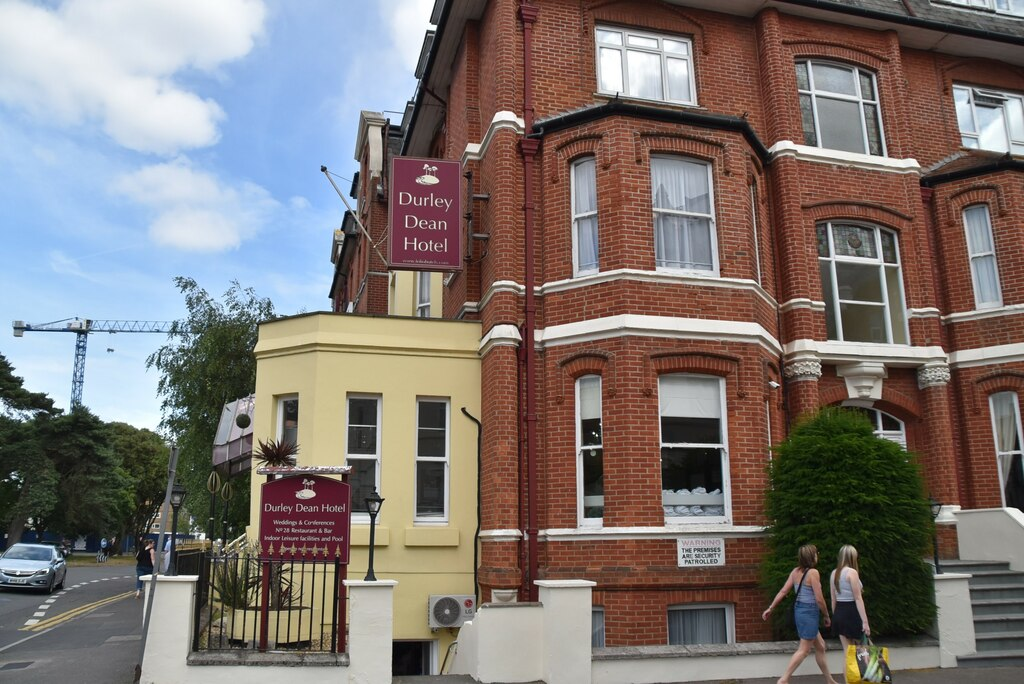
- The hotel pictured in 2019
- Interactive map of the Durley Dean Hotel area

General information
- Architectural style: Victorian
- Location: Bournemouth, United Kingdom
- Year built: 19th century

Website
- www.durleydean.co.uk

The Durley Dean Hotel is a historic hotel in the West Cliff area of Bournemouth, Dorset, England.

== History ==
The oldest part of the hotel was constructed around 1800. The collection terraced hotels and houses were amalgamated into a single hotel over time. In 2007, the hotel was purchased by a Southampton-based restaurateur. The hotel featured on Britain's Best Breaks on Sky TV. In 2008, the hotel reopened following a multimillion-pound renovation. The No.23 restaurant is located on the ground floor. In 2009, the company which owned the hotel went into administration. In March 2026, the hotel was put up for sale.
