= Bournemouth Daily Echo building =

Historic landmark in Bournemouth, England

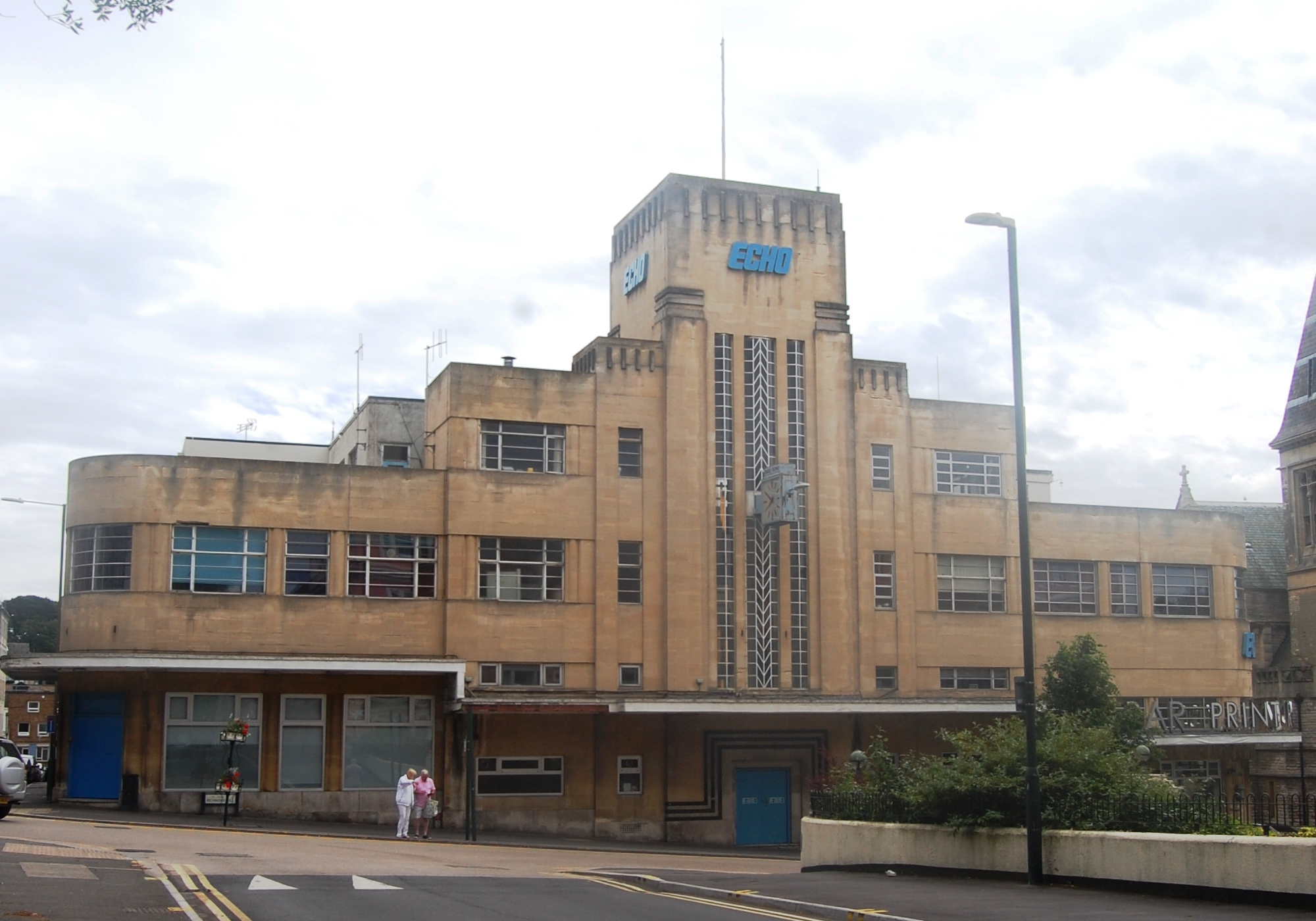
- Bournemouth Daily Echo building in 2022
- Interactive map of the Bournemouth Daily Echo building area

General information
- Status: active
- Type: office
- Architectural style: Art Deco architecture
- Location: Richmond Hill, Bournemouth, United Kingdom
- Coordinates: 50.7214°N 1.8783°W
- Year built: 1932
- Opened: 1932

Technical details
- Floor count: 4

Design and construction
- Architects: Seal and Hardy

The Bournemouth Daily Echo building is a historic landmark and Grade II listed building in Bournemouth, England. The office building is located on Richmond Hill next door to the Sacred Heart Church.

== History ==
The building was built in 1932 by Seal and Hardy as offices for the Bournemouth Echo newspaper. The designs are in the Art Deco architectural style with maritime features in an Egyptian sandstone colour. In 2021, the building was redeveloped into a larger office space.
