= Fisherman's Walk Cliff Railway =

Lift running from the clifftop to the beach in Southbourne, Bournemouth, Dorset

Coordinates: 50.721083°N 1.817352°W

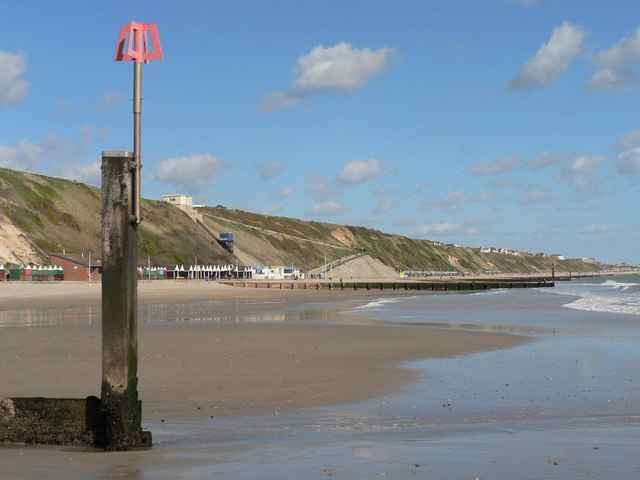
- The cliff railway (left of centre) seen from the beach

Overview
- Status: in use
- Locale: Southbourne, United Kingdom

Service
- Type: Funicular
- Operator(s): Bournemouth, Christchurch and Poole Council

History
- Opened: 1935

Technical
- Line length: 128 feet (39 m)
- Number of tracks: Double track
- Track gauge: 5 ft 8 in (1,727 mm)
- Maximum incline: 67.11%

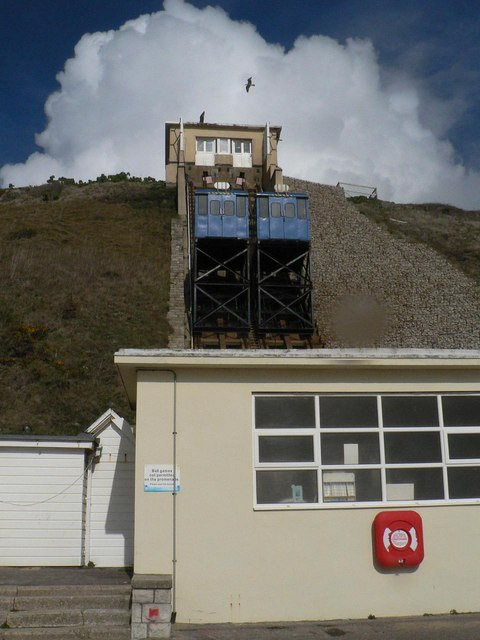
A closer view of the line from below.

The Fisherman's Walk Cliff Railway, or Southbourne Cliff Railway, is the world’s shortest public funicular railway located in Southbourne (a seaside suburb of the English seaside resort of Bournemouth). The line serves to link the seaside promenade and beach, with the cliff top and the town behind.

== Overview ==
The line is owned and operated by Bournemouth, Christchurch and Poole Council, and it has the following technical parameters:

=== Technical parameters ===
- Length: 128 feet (39 m)
- Gradient: 1:1.49 (67.11%)
- Cars: 2
- Capacity: 12 passengers per car
- Configuration: Double track
- Gauge: 5 ft 8 in (1,727 mm)
- Traction: Electricity

== History ==
Opened in 1935 by Bournemouth Corporation, Fisherman's Walk Cliff Railway is the most recent of the town's three lines. Traction was originally provided by a 21 horsepower (16 kW) electric motor, although this was replaced in the 1960s. The passenger cabs were replaced with newer versions in April 2012. Fisherman's Walk Cliff Railway is credited as the shortest funicular in the world by the 2015 Guinness Book of Records.

== Nearby funiculars ==
There are two other cliff railways in Bournemouth, the West Cliff Railway and the East Cliff Railway (closed since 2016). All three operate between April and October.

== Use as an arts venue ==
On Sunday 6 May 2018, Bournemouth-based sound and performance artists Language, Timothy! performed a site-specific theatre performance called 'Sound Journeys: The Longest Second' across both passenger cars of the Fisherman's Walk Cliff railway. The piece - two, one-minute vignettes created especially for the Southbourne railway - was a commission for Bournemouth Emerging Arts Fringe (BEAF) Festival 2018. Over 500 passengers saw one or both halves of the piece which ran for four hours during usual cliff lift operating hours.

== See also ==
- List of funicular railways
