= Christ Church, Westbourne =

Church in Bournemouth, Dorset, England

Christ Church
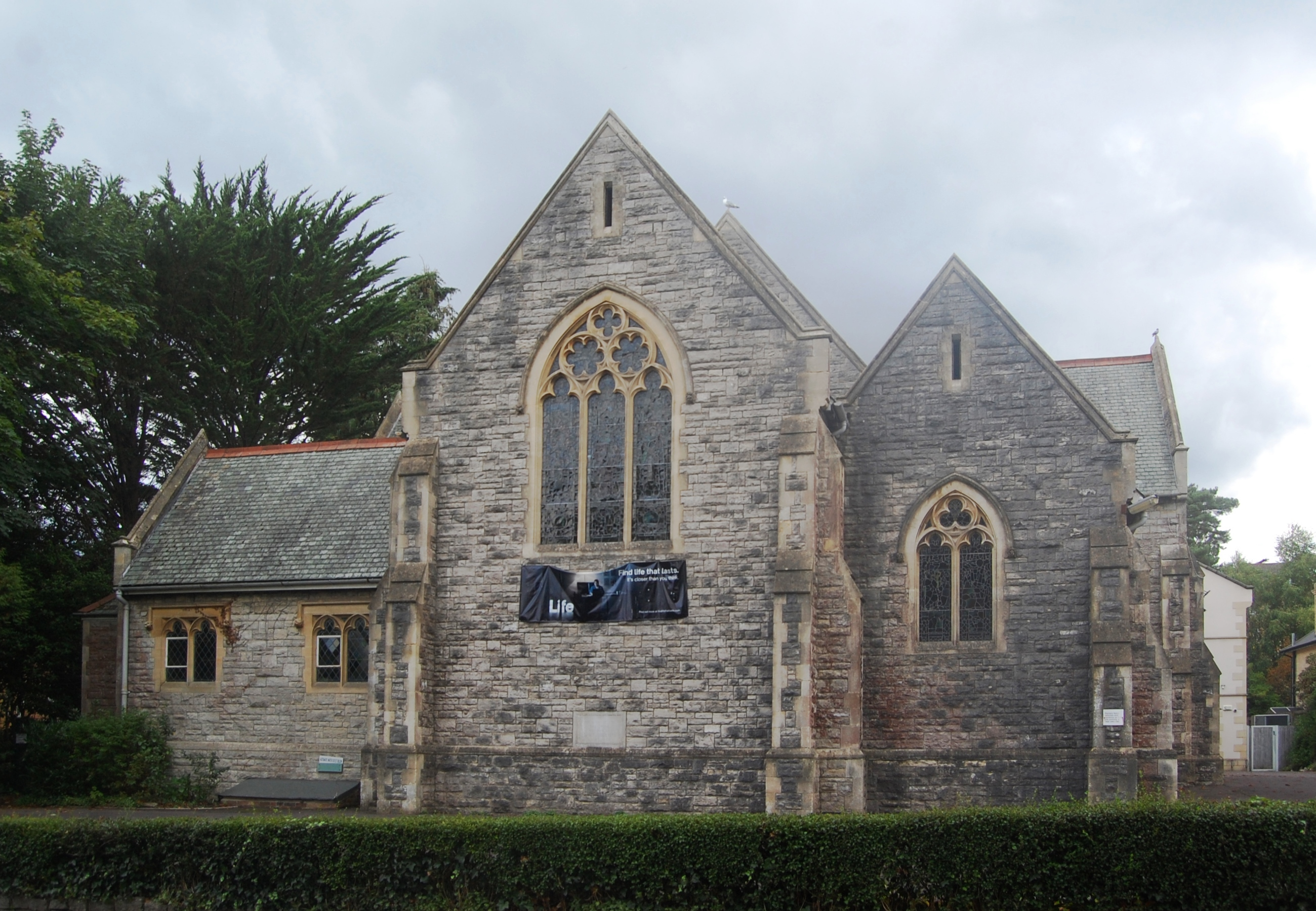
- Christ Church in 2022

Religion
- Affiliation: Anglicanism
- Ecclesiastical or organizational status: active

Location
- Location: Alumhurst Road, Westbourne, Bournemouth, Dorset, England
- Interactive map of Christ Church
- Coordinates: 50.720519°N 1.905803°W

Architecture
- Architect: Charles Marriott Oldrid Scott
- Type: Church
- Style: Gothic Revival architecture
- Completed: 1913

Website
- www.christchurchwestbourne.com

Christ Church is a historic church in the Westbourne area of Bournemouth, Dorset, England.

== History ==
The church was designed by the architect Edwin Henry Lingen Barker. The church is constructed with Purbeck stone and is part of the Anglican Communion. It is part of the Diocese of Winchester. The border of the Borough of Poole runs immediately behind the churchyard. In 2012, a new hall was opened at the church.

== See also ==
- List of churches in Bournemouth
- List of Anglican churches
