= Westbourne, Dorset =

Area of Bournemouth, England

Coordinates: 50°43′03″N 1°53′58″W

Westbourne
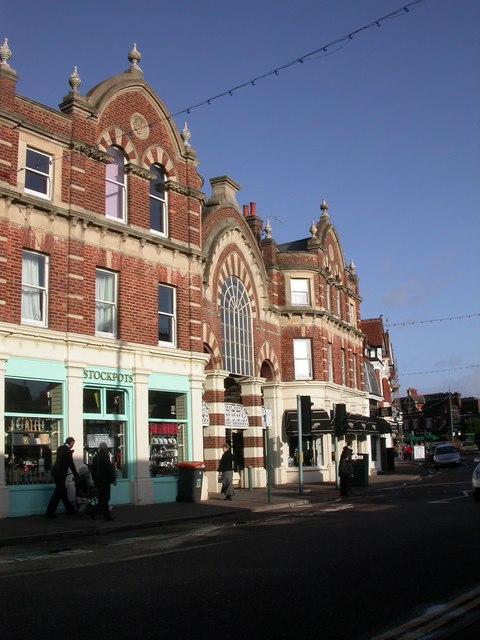
- Victorian arcade at Westbourne

- Location within Dorset
- Population: 10,365 (2011)
- OS grid reference: SZ071911
- Unitary authority: Bournemouth, Christchurch and Poole
- Ceremonial county: Dorset
- Region: South West
- Country: England
- Sovereign state: United Kingdom
- Post town: BOURNEMOUTH
- Postcode district: BH4
- Dialling code: 01202
- Police: Dorset
- Fire: Dorset and Wiltshire
- Ambulance: South Western
- UK Parliament: Bournemouth West

Westbourne is a residential and shopping area of Bournemouth, Dorset, England. It is located in between Branksome, Poole and the centre of Bournemouth, just off the A338. Poole Road, mainly full of specialised shops and small cafes, runs through the centre of Westbourne with Seamoor Road curving round bringing more shops and services. Many of the shops have residential property above them.

== Commerce ==
The main high street of Westbourne is centred around the grade II listed Victorian shopping arcade that links Poole Road and Seamoor Road. It was built in 1884-5 in a polychrome gothic style by the builder Henry Joy, who also built Bournemouth arcade.

Westbourne had an ornate cinema called "The Grand", that was converted into a bingo hall. The bingo hall has since closed.

There are several international language schools in Westbourne.

Westbourne is also home to the head office of the Liverpool Victoria Group which has three buildings, Frizzell House in the centre of County Gates roundabout, with Victoria and County Gates houses close by. It is a large local employer with around 1600 staff.

Many local traders are members of the Westbourne Traders Association (WTA). The group promotes the interests of the traders and aims to raise the profile of Westbourne to tourists and local residents. In May 2009, the WTA released a free map and business directory with distribution across the South coast. In 2011 a new campaign to promote Westbourne as a shopping and tourism destination was launched under the name 'Discover Westbourne'. Their website has a directory listing all shops and businesses in Westbourne.

== Notable residents ==
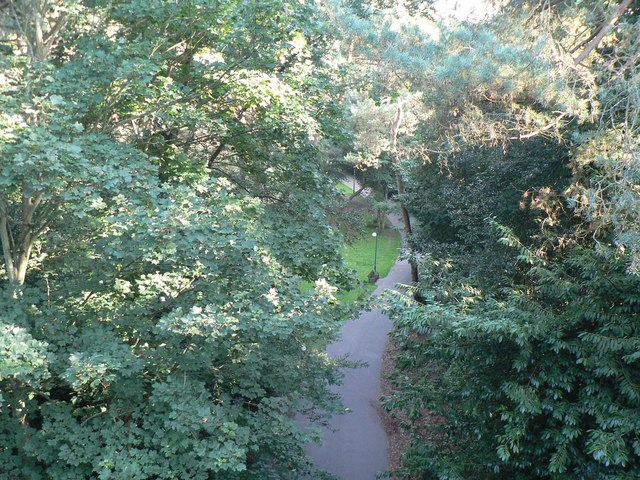
Alum Chine

The subarea known as Alum Chine (a chine being the local name for a deep gorge caused by river erosion extending to the sea) provides a pathway to the beach, and is crossed by a pedestrian suspension bridge.

Branksome Dene chine is nearby and it was on a bridge across this chine from which Winston Churchill fell when he was 18 in 1892, breaking both legs and damaging his kidneys.

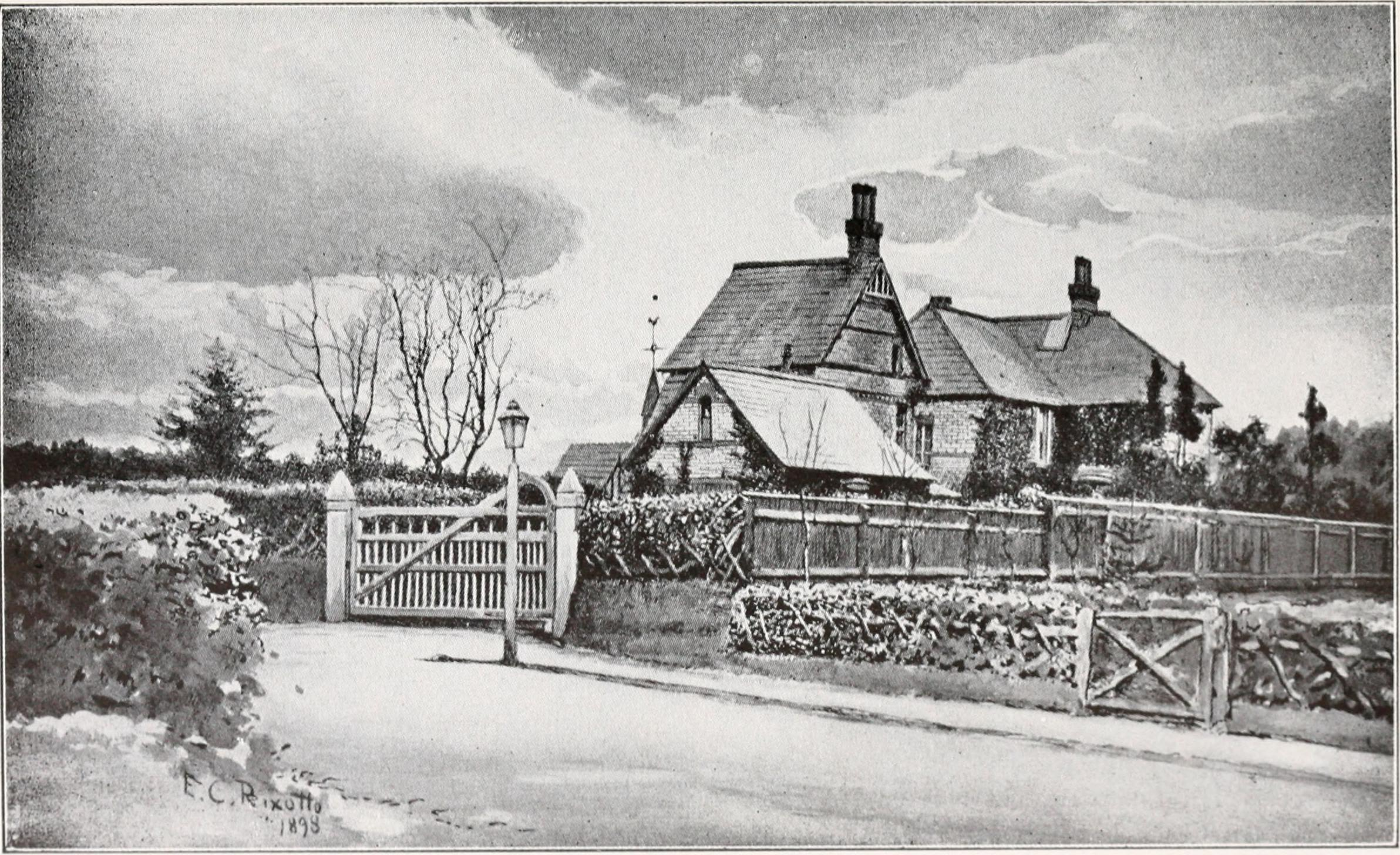
Robert Louis Stevenson's house Skerryvore

Robert Louis Stevenson was Westbourne's most famous resident, who lived at 'Skerryvore' on the West Cliff between 1885 and 1887. While at this rather ordinary house he wrote Kidnapped and The Strange Case of Dr. Jekyll and Mr. Hyde, as well as part of Treasure Island while he was recovering from an illness. It is here that John Singer Sergeant painted R.L. Stevenson pacing his drawing room with his wife sitting nearby in 1885 and a novel of his life while residing in Westbourne (published in 1929 titled 'R.L.S and his Sine Qua Non') was written by Adelaide A. Boodle. There is a small statue commemorating his work on the site of the house he lived in, which was destroyed in the Second World War.

Florence Nightingale had an interest in Westbourne when in 1867 she was a prime mover in the building of the Herbert Home Hospital.

The singer Ray Dorset of Mungo Jerry lives in the area as does British boxer Steve Bendall.

== Transport ==
Westbourne has good bus links to both Bournemouth and Poole and the beach is a 15-minute walk away.

As of October 2022, Westbourne is served by morebus services m1, m2, 16, 20, Unibus U4, Purbeck Breezer 50 and Beach Breezer 70.

Until its closure in 1965, Westbourne had a railway station known as Bournemouth West Station Terminus. The station was often very busy during the summer seasons, as it was a main disembarkation point for holidaymakers to Poole and Bournemouth. The closest railway station is now Branksome Railway Station.

== Religious buildings ==
- Christ Church, Westbourne
- St Ambrose Church, Westbourne
- West Cliff Baptist Church
