= West Cliff Railway =

Funicular railway in Bournemouth, Dorset, England

Coordinates: 50.715085°N 1.88135°W

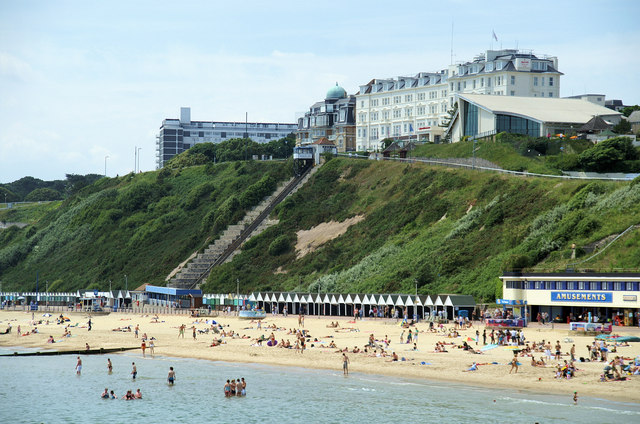
- The beach, cliff railway and cliff-top hotels viewed from the Pier

Overview
- Status: in use
- Locale: West Cliff, Bournemouth, England, United Kingdom

Service
- Type: Funicular
- Operator(s): Bournemouth, Christchurch and Poole Council

History
- Opened: 1935

Technical
- Line length: 145 feet (44 m)
- Number of tracks: Double track
- Track gauge: 5 ft 6 in (1,676 mm)
- Maximum incline: 70.4%

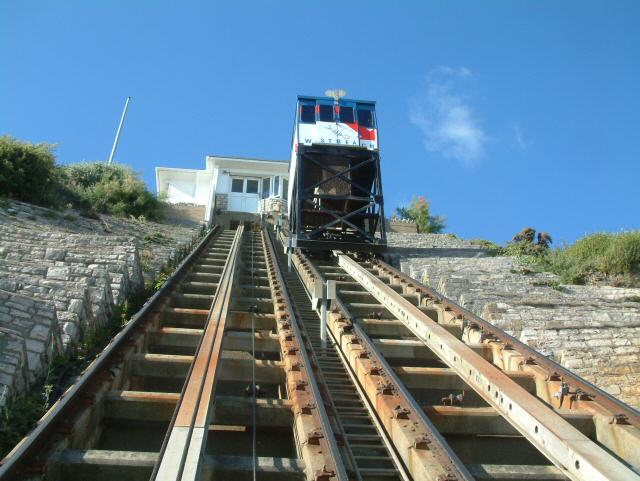
The line viewed from below.

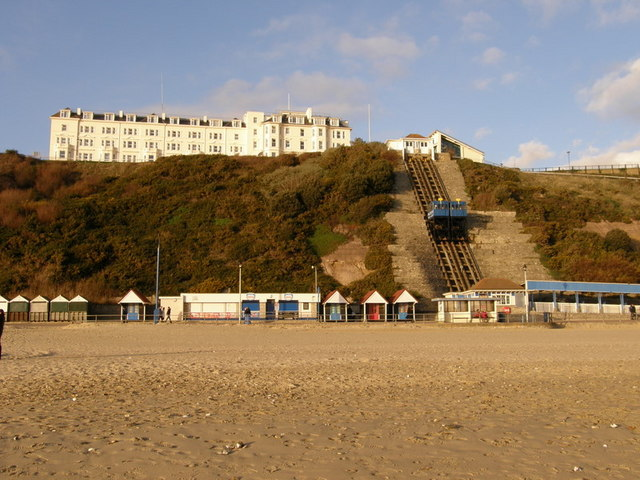
The line and beach. In December the beach is deserted and the line closed for the winter.

The West Cliff Railway, or West Cliff Lift, is a funicular railway located on West Cliff in the English seaside resort of Bournemouth. The line serves to link the seaside promenade and beach with the cliff top and the town behind.

== Overview ==
The line is owned and operated by Bournemouth, Christchurch and Poole Council and has the following technical parameters:

=== Technical Parameters ===
- Length: 145 feet (44 m)
- Gradient: 70.4%
- Cars: 2
- Capacity: 12 passengers per car
- Configuration: Double track
- Gauge: 5 ft 6 in (1,676 mm)
- Traction: Electricity

== History ==
The West Cliff Railway was opened in 1908 by Bournemouth Corporation, some four months after the opening of the nearby East Cliff Railway. Like the East Cliff Railway, it was electrically operated from the start, with winding gear situated at the upper station driven by a 25 horsepower (19 kW) winding motor. The line was controlled by a driver at the upper station, assisted by an attendant at the lower station. Wooden-bodied cars were used.

The winding motor was replaced in the 1960s by a 28 horsepower (21 kW) three-phase motor. The cars were also replaced in the 1960s by aluminium-bodied cars intended to be interchangeable across all three of Bournemouth's surviving cliff railways. In 1987 the track was re-laid, and during the 1990s the line was further upgraded with the installation of an electronic control system.

== Further nearby Funiculars ==
The West Cliff Railway is one of three such cliff railways in Bournemouth, the other two being the East Cliff Railway (closed since 2016) and the Fisherman's Walk Cliff Railway. All three operate between April and October.

== See also ==
- List of funicular railways
