= Richmond Hill, Bournemouth =

Area of Bournemouth, Dorset, England

Coordinates: 50°43′9.74″N 1°52′41.25″W

Richmond Hill
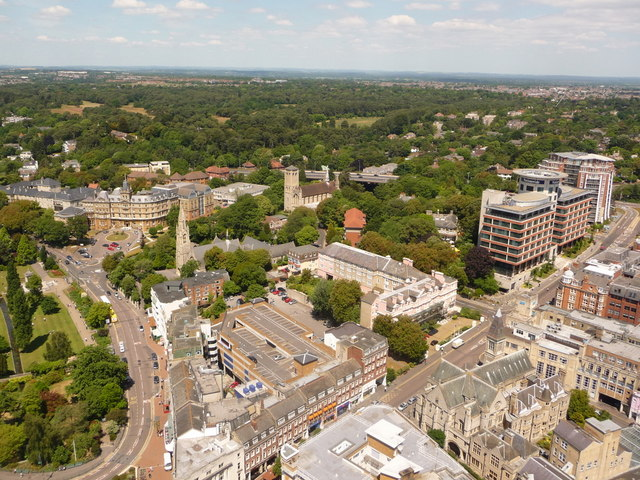
- Richmond Hill

- Location within Dorset
- Unitary authority: Bournemouth, Christchurch and Poole
- Ceremonial county: Dorset
- Region: South West
- Country: England
- Sovereign state: United Kingdom
- Post town: BOURNEMOUTH
- Postcode district: BH
- Police: Dorset
- Fire: Dorset and Wiltshire
- Ambulance: South Western
- UK Parliament: Bournemouth West

Richmond Hill is an area of Bournemouth, Dorset, England. It is to the north of Bournemouth town centre, south of Richmond Park and west of Lansdowne. The area is located around the road of the same name.

== History ==
In 2018 and 2019, the road was turned into a temporary waterslide in the summer.

In 2023, Vitality were scheduled to move into the Nationwide building in Richmond Hill.

In 2024, a police investigation was launched into a suspected brothel in the area.

== Buildings ==
- Portman Building Society (formerly)
- Bournemouth Daily Echo building
- Sacred Heart Church
- Norfolk Royale Hotel
- St. Andrew's Church, Richmond Hill – the largest church in Bournemouth

== Transportation ==
In 1975, the A338 underpass was built underneath Richmond Hill Roundabout.

The Square is at the bottom of Richmond Hill.

== Politics ==
Richmond Hill is part of the Bournemouth Central ward for elections to the Bournemouth, Christchurch and Poole Council. The same ward elected councillors to Bournemouth Borough Council.

Richmond Hill is also part of the Bournemouth West parliamentary constituency for elections to the House of Commons of the United Kingdom.

== Notable people ==
- Hubert Parry was born in Richmond Hill
- John Elmes Beale, politician and businessman

== Gallery ==
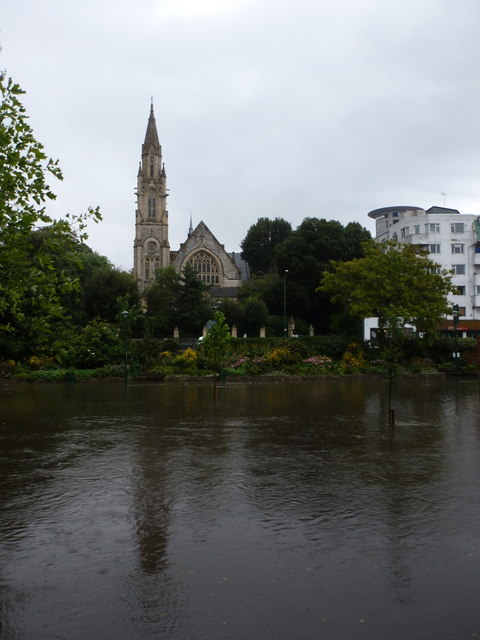
St. Andrew’s Church across from a flooded River Bourne in 2011.

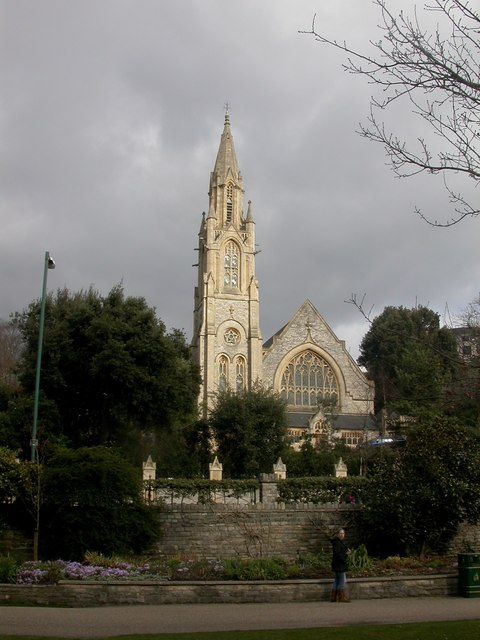
St. Andrew's Church, Richmond Hill.

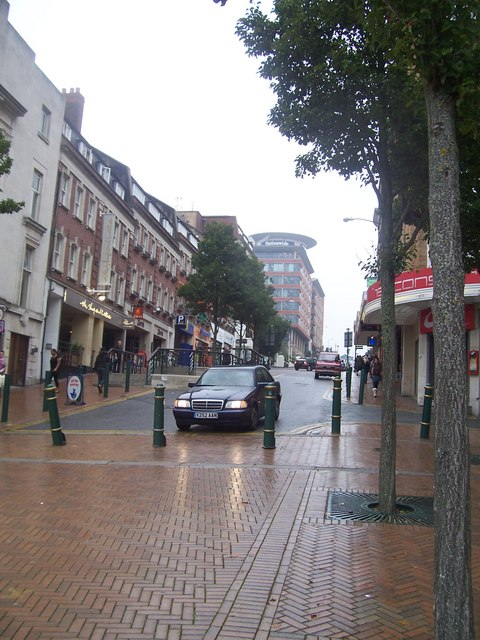
View up Richmond Hill

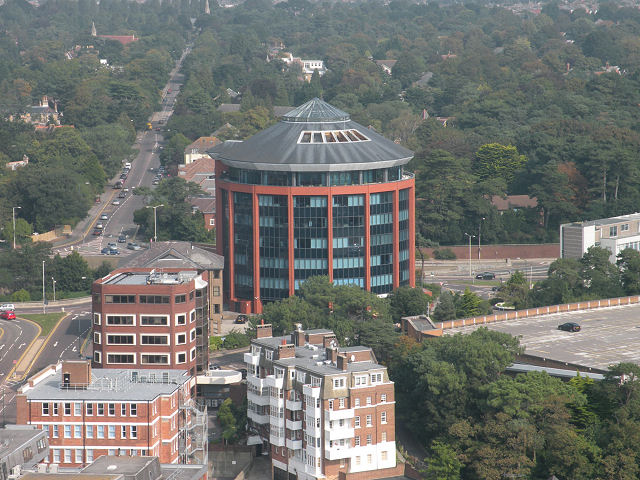
The Marshall Point building at the top of Richmond Hill.

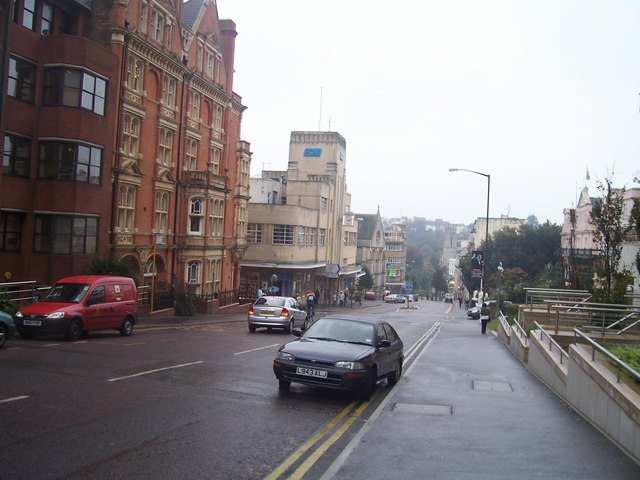
The Bournemouth Daily Echo building on the left.

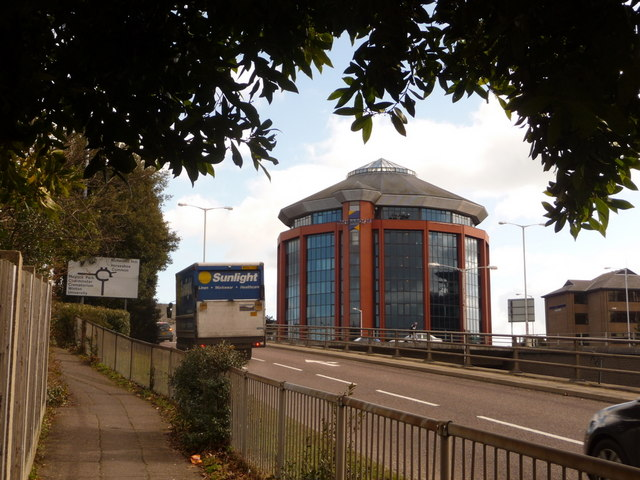
The Richmond Hill slip-road at the A338 road.
