= East Cliff Railway =

Funicular railway in Bournemouth, Dorset, England

Coordinates: 50.717989°N 1.865364°W

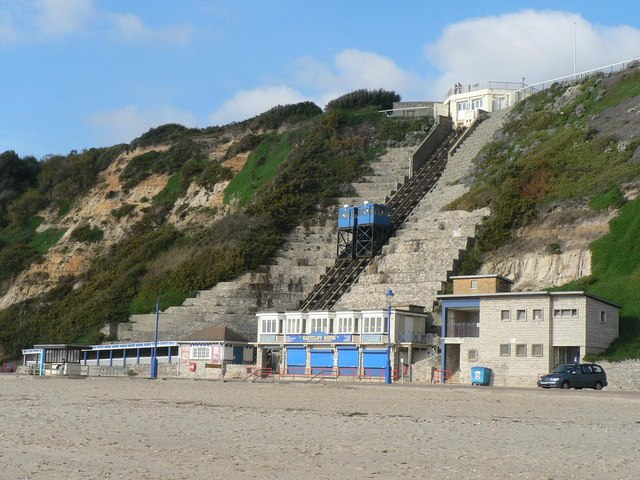
- The cliff railway from the beach. In November, the railway is shut down for the winter

Overview
- Status: disused
- Locale: East Cliff, Bournemouth, England, United Kingdom

Service
- Type: Funicular
- Operator(s): Bournemouth, Christchurch and Poole Council

History
- Opened: 1908
- Closed: April 2016

Technical
- Line length: 170 feet (52 m)
- Number of tracks: Double track
- Track gauge: 5 ft 6 in (1,676 mm)
- Maximum incline: 68.9%

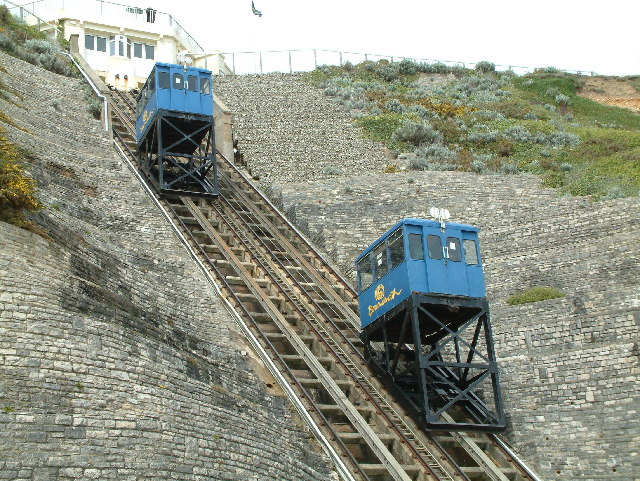
A closer view of the line in operation.

The East Cliff Railway, or East Cliff Lift, is a funicular railway located on the East Cliff of the English seaside resort of Bournemouth. The line serves to link the seaside promenade and beach with the cliff top and the town behind. Following a landslip in April 2016 which damaged the line and associated structures, the railway is out of use indefinitely.

== Overview ==
The line is owned and operated by Bournemouth, Christchurch and Poole Council and has the following technical parameters:

=== Technical Parameters ===
- Length: 170 feet (52 m)
- Gradient: 68.9%
- Cars: 2
- Capacity: 12 passengers per car
- Configuration: Double track
- Gauge: 5 ft 6 in (1,676 mm)
- Traction: Electricity

== History ==
The line was constructed for Bournemouth Corporation, and opened in 1908. It was electrically operated from the start, with winding gear situated at the upper station driven by a 25 horsepower (19 kW) winding motor. The line was controlled by a driver at the upper station, assisted by an attendant at the lower station. Wooden-bodied cars were used. The cars were replaced in the 1960s by aluminium-bodied cars intended to be interchangeable across all three of Bournemouth's surviving cliff railways. In 1987 the track was re-laid, and during the 1990s the line was further upgraded with the installation of an electronic control system.

On 24 April 2016 the lift was damaged by a landslip which occurred when the sandstone layers within the cliff on which the lift rests became saturated with water. The cars were removed from the track by crane on 21 May 2016. The landslip also damaged the lower toll house for the lift and the decision was taken to dismantle the building. As of July 2023 the lift remains closed, with ongoing work to stabilise the cliff. A study is planned to assess the feasibility of reopening the lift or developing an alternative.

== Further nearby Funiculars ==
The East Cliff Railway is one of three such cliff railways in Bournemouth, the other two being the West Cliff Railway and the Fisherman's Walk Cliff Railway. All three operate between April and October.

== See also ==
- List of funicular railways
