= Tivoli pier collapse =

- Date: July 23, 1883
- Location: Patapsco River Sparrows Point, Maryland; 39°12′53″N 76°27′10″W
- Cause: Rotten pier that collapsed under the weight of a large crowd
- Deaths: 63
- Coroner: Charles McLean Morfit
- Accused: Lowry Albert and Frank Debelius
- Charges: Manslaughter and criminal neglect
- Verdict: Not guilty

The Tivoli pier collapse occurred on July 23, 1883 at a privately-owned park in Sparrows Point, Maryland. The collapse caused 63 people — 34 women, 23 children and six men — to drown in the Patapsco River.

== History ==
The park, originally known as Holly Grove, was located on 168 acres of woodland owned by William J. Albert. He began work on the park in 1868 and it opened the following year. It was the second resort in the area after White Rocks, which was located opposite of Tivoli. It was described by The Baltimore Sun as a "first-class [resort]". From 1870 to 1878, it was leased to the Maryland Steamboat Company. It was then leased by Frank Debelius, who acquired the Cockade City, an excursion barge capable of carrying 1,500 people, to bring passengers to the resort. Upon Albert's death, the property was inherited by his son, Lowry Albert.

The first pier was completed in 1869 and a second, stronger and larger pier, was built two years later. The two piers were joined by a connecting pier. The original pier, known as the east pier, was used for disembarkation, and the west pier was used for embarkation. There were two gates on the pier – one at the shore end and one before the west pier widened into a wharf.

Weeks before the collapse, Lowry Albert complained to a local judge that Debilius owed him rent and that the piers were in such bad shape, he feared there could be an accident. However, Debilius soon made arrangements to pay the money he owed and to repair the piers. Debilius, however, refuted this, stating that he had made repairs to the connecting pier and to some of boards on the other piers and that Albert wanted him to build entirely new piers, which he did not think was necessary.

== Collapse ==
On July 23, 1883, Tivoli hosted a picnic organized by the Mount Royal Beneficial Society, a group affiliated with the Catholic Corpus Christi Church in Baltimore's Bolton Hill neighborhood. About 500 people attended the event and most remained late into the evening.

The Cockade City made three trips during the day. On its final trip to Tivoli, the lock on the shore gate was broken and the crowd rushed to the second gate. Gatekeeper John Connor would not let anyone past the boat gate, as he believed the passengers would be safer on the pier, which had a rail, than the wharf. During the rush, a rail broke and a man and a boy were thrown into the water. Soon thereafter, the middle portion of the pier collapsed and roughly 200 people were thrown into the water, which was eight to ten feet deep. The pier was poorly lit, which increased the confusion and panic. A bonfire was lit on shore to help illuminate the water. Most of those thrown in the river were able to save themselves and others were saved by those on shore. The hundreds who remained on the uncollapsed part of the pier were brought aboard the Cockade City. 63 people (34 women, 23 children and six men), drowned.

== Investigation and legal proceedings ==
Eyewitnesses gave two possible causes for the collapse. The first was the rush of onlookers to the rail after the first person fell into the water. Others blamed the Cockade City, which was said to have violently hit the pier while repositioning.

Investigators found that the pier had 300 patches to its timber, four improvised supports, and low-quality girders. Coroner Charles McLean Morfit ruled that the deceased "came to their deaths by drowning by the breaking of a bridge at Tivoli on the night of July 23 and that the authorities of the place did not use proper care or precaution to prevent the occurrence".

On October 18, 1883, Frank Debelius and Lowry Albert were indicted for manslaughter and criminal neglect. Their trial began on February 4, 1884 in Towson, Maryland. The charges against Albert were withdrawn on February 6 and Debilus was acquitted the following day.

The first of ten civil suits against Albert commenced on March 19, 1886 in Ellicott City, Maryland. The trial ended on March 22 with a jury awarding Thomas Ryan, whose father died in the collapse, $1,500 ($53,750 in 2025). On March 23, 1887, Albert settled the remaining suits for an undisclosed amount.

== Aftermath ==
In 1887, Jacob H. Taylor purchased 1,200 acres of land on Sparrow Point, including Tivoli, with plans to construct a steel plant there. Maryland Steel constructed a plant on part of the property but, Tivoli, renamed Penwood Park, continued to host excursions. The piers were abandoned in favor of rail travel, as Penwood Park became the terminus of the Baltimore & Sparrows Point Railroad Company. The property eventually became part of the Bethlehem Sparrows Point Shipyard.

The Corpus Christi Church rings its bells to the tune of Psalm 130 every night at 7:05 pm in memory of the victims of the Tivoli disaster.
