= The Downstairs Club =

Coordinates: 50°43′21.4″N 1°51′57.5″W

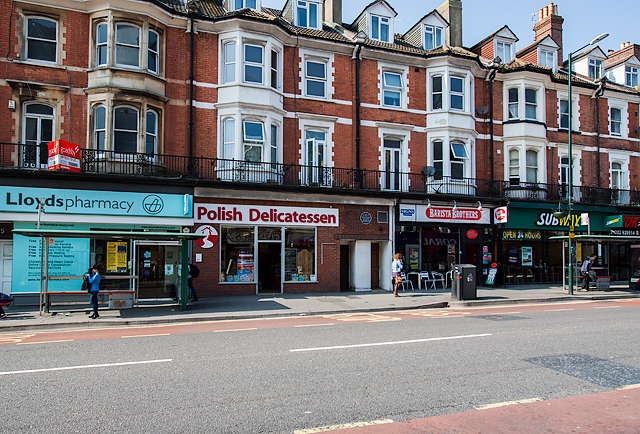
- The building on Holdenhurst Road the basement of which held the Downstairs Club, photographed in 2015
- Industry: Music; Entertainment; Events; Lifestyle
- Founded: 1961; 65 years ago
- Headquarters: 9 Holdenhurst Road, Lansdowne, Bournemouth, United Kingdom

The Downstairs Club was Bournemouth's first full-time rock, rhythm and blues and jazz venue. It opened in 1961 and under its later name of Le Disque a Go! Go! hosted performances from Manfred Mann, The Who, Eric Clapton, Andy Summers, Georgie Fame, Zoot Money and others. In 2014 a blue plaque commemorating the club was unveiled outside the former premises.

== History ==
The Downstairs Club, Bournemouth was opened by Jerry Stooks, a local musician, on 3 May 1961. It occupied a cellar under a greengrocer's shop at 9 Holdenhurst Road, Lansdowne, Bournemouth. From the outset Stooks ran it as a full-time venue, featuring a variety of live bands each night of the week, including Sundays, with weekend all-night sessions extending to 6.00 am. although the club was not licensed to serve alcohol. The initial booking policy was slanted towards jazz but within a few weeks the emphasis switched to rock’n’roll and the first rock groups began appearing at the club, though jazz combos also continued to be play there over the following years. During the period of Jerry Stooks's ownership the club featured almost exclusively local bands, though several of these included musicians who later achieved wider fame, including Michael Giles and his brother Peter, Andy Summers, and Zoot Money, the original version of whose Big Roll Band played its first public performance at the club in Autumn 1961. This policy largely continued during the ownership of Tony Silvestri, who renamed it the Lansdowne Club, before Allan Azern (who later became pianist with Trendsetters Limited) subsequently took over the club, and changed its name to Le Disque a Go! Go! It was under that name that the club began to feature London bands, such as Manfred Mann, John Mayall & the Bluesbreakers (with Eric Clapton on guitar), The Who, Georgie Fame and many others, including the now London-based Zoot Money's Big Roll Band.

The club later became a discothèque/nightclub under various names, but the basement premises eventually reverted to use as a storage room.

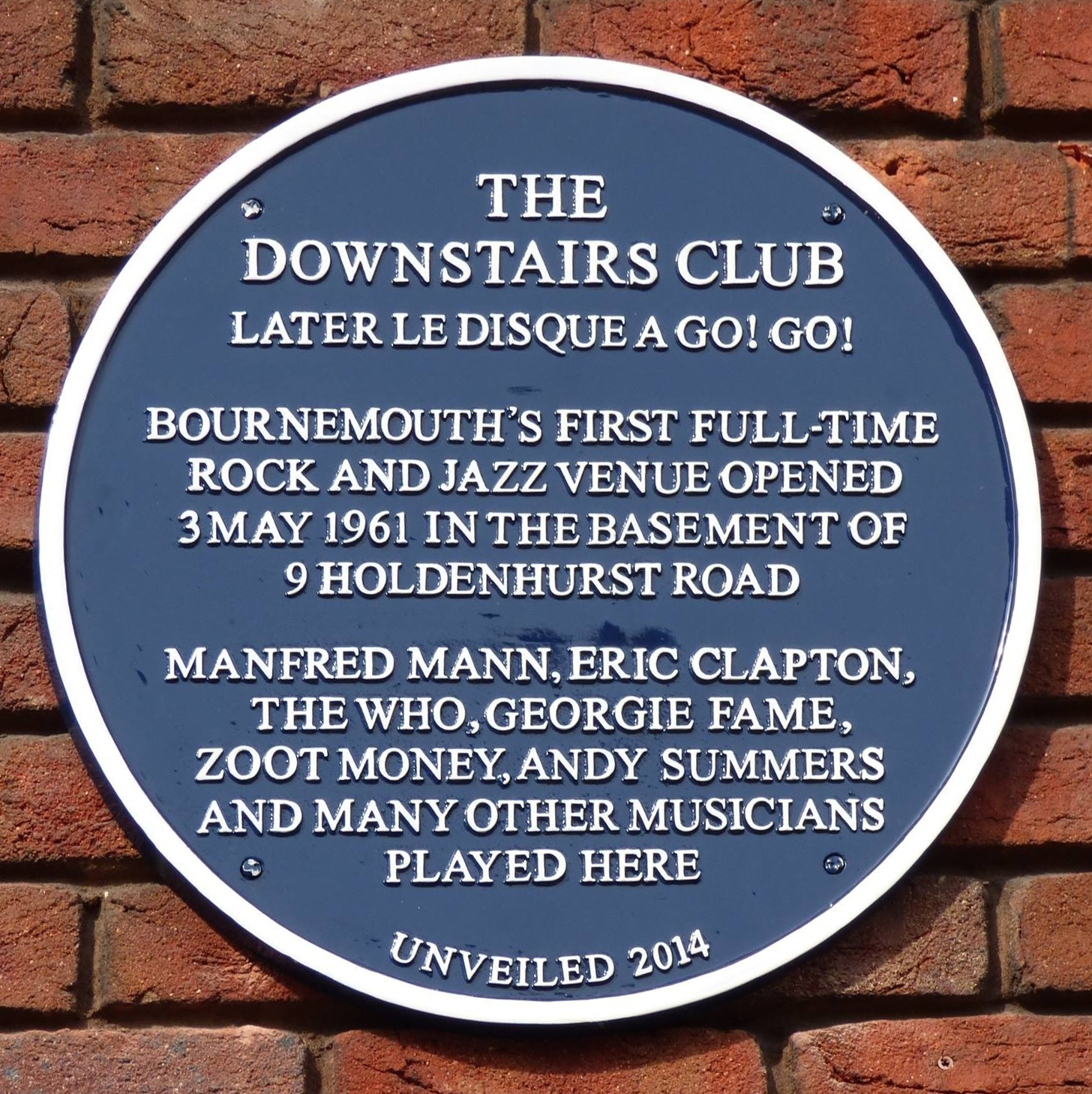
Blue plaque

On 14 September 2014 a blue plaque commemorating the club was unveiled at the site of the premises by Zoot Money.
