= 1945 Edgewood Arsenal explosion =

Industrial disaster in Maryland, United States

- Date: May 25, 1945
- Venue: Building 509 Edgewood Arsenal
- Location: Harford County, Maryland, United States; 39.3943°N 76.2933°W
- Type: Explosion
- Deaths: 12
- Injuries: >50

The 1945 Edgewood Arsenal explosion killed twelve munitions workers and injured more than fifty on May 25, 1945. Building 509 at Edgewood Arsenal in Harford County, Maryland was a production facility for the assembly of phosphorus igniter assemblies for incendiary bombs, employing a female staff of about 135 assemblers. Nine workers, of whom eight were African-American, were killed in the initial blast, and three more died of their injuries.
