= Norfolk Royale Hotel =

Hotel in Bournemouth, Dorset, England

Coordinates: 50.721544°N 1.879212°W

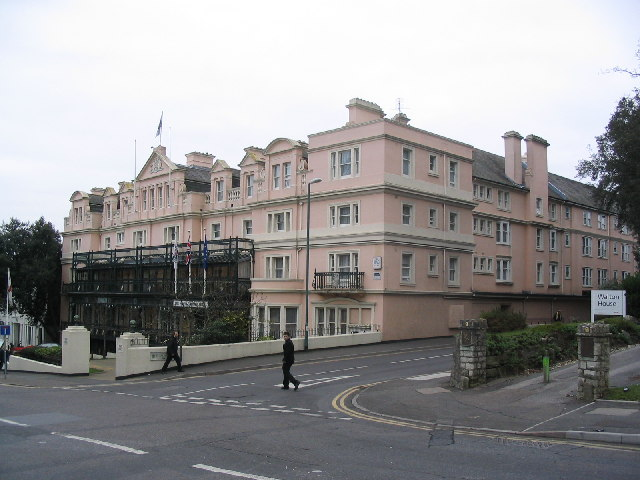
- The hotel pictured in 2009

General information
- Location: Bournemouth, United Kingdom

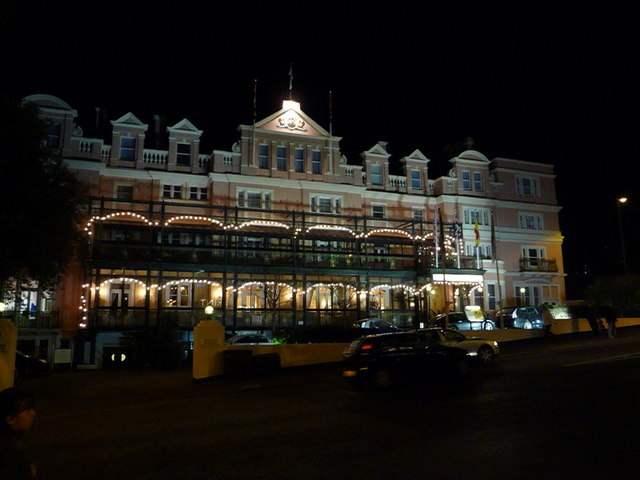
The hotel at night.

The Norfolk Royale Hotel is a Grade II listed building and 4 star Victorian hotel in Richmond Hill, Bournemouth, Dorset in England. The hotel is one of Bournemouth's most historic buildings and stands behind St. Andrew's Church, Richmond Hill and opposite the Sacred Heart Church.

== History ==
The hotel was built as 2 large villas between 1840 and 1850 for Henry Fitzalan-Howard, the 14th Duke of Norfolk. It became a hotel in 1870.

In 1946, hotel guest Doreen Margaret Marshall was murdered by serial killer Neville Heath.

The hotel exterior was used for a scene in One Foot in the Grave, ‘The Worst Horror of All’, where Victor Meldrew gets a job as a doorman. The episode was broadcast on the BBC in 1992.

In November 1992, Price Waterhouse offered the hotel for sale at £4 million and two years later it was on the market for £6 million. The hotel was put up for sale again in 2008.

In 2017, the hotel's owner took a 10 million pound loan. In April 2022 it was reported that the hotel had been put up for sale for £9 million. The sale was reportedly intended to clear the owners debts.

In early 2023, the hotel was purchased by coach operator Alfa Leisureplex Group. They bought it from Peel Hotels for an undisclosed sum.

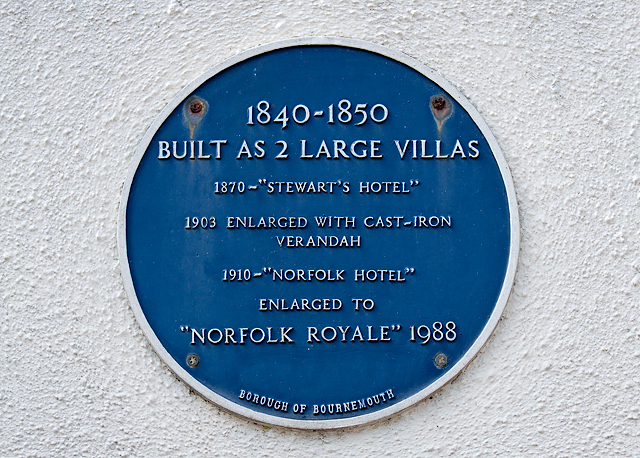
Hotel blue plaque

In October 2023, an elderly woman was rescued after her car accidentally reversed into a ditch in the hotel car park. Later that month the hotels new owners applied for planning permission for a remodelling of the interior including 31 new bedrooms and a larger entertainment space.
