= Alum Chine explosion =

1913 maritime disaster near Baltimore, Maryland

Coordinates: 39.221391°N 76.558255°W

The Alum Chine explosion was a disaster that occurred in the Patapsco River near Baltimore, Maryland on March 7, 1913. The tramp steamer Alum Chine exploded while loading dynamite, killing 33 and injuring 60.

== Incident ==
The 1767-ton freighter Alum Chine was built in 1905. The ship was named after Alum Chine, the largest chine in Bournemouth, England. On March 7, 1913 it was loading 350 short tons (320 t) of dynamite bound for the Panama Canal near Fort Carroll in the outer portion of Baltimore Harbor, when, at about 10:00 in the morning, smoke appeared from the ship's hold. The crew and stevedores who had been loading from a barge attempted to flee, assisted by the tug Atlantic, but the Alum Chine exploded at 10:30. The explosion of the ship and the dynamite remaining on the barge killed 33 near and aboard the Alum Chine, including several aboard the Atlantic and the nearby U.S. Navy collier Jason. Debris was found over a 2-mile (3.2 km) radius. The Baltimore Quarantine Hospital at Wagner's Point lost all of its windows, and the concussion was said to have been felt in Philadelphia and Atlantic City.

== Aftermath ==
At the inquest into the incident, suspicion fell on the assistant foreman of the stevedores loading the ship, William J. Bomhardt, who was arrested on suspicion that he had struck a box of dynamite with a bale hook, causing the box to explode and leading to the eventual larger explosion. A theory was advanced during the inquest that the dynamite, which had been frozen for loading, was starting to thaw and form blisters of nitroglycerine. Despite testimony from an explosives expert that such an action by Bornhardt would not cause an explosion, and that the more likely cause was fire in the ship's coal bunker, the jury found Bomhardt responsible for the explosion.

Debris attributed to the Alum Chine was found during construction of the Fort McHenry Tunnel under Baltimore Harbor.
