= Sacred Heart Church, Bournemouth =

Church in Dorset, England

Sacred Heart Church
- Catholic Church of the Sacred Heart
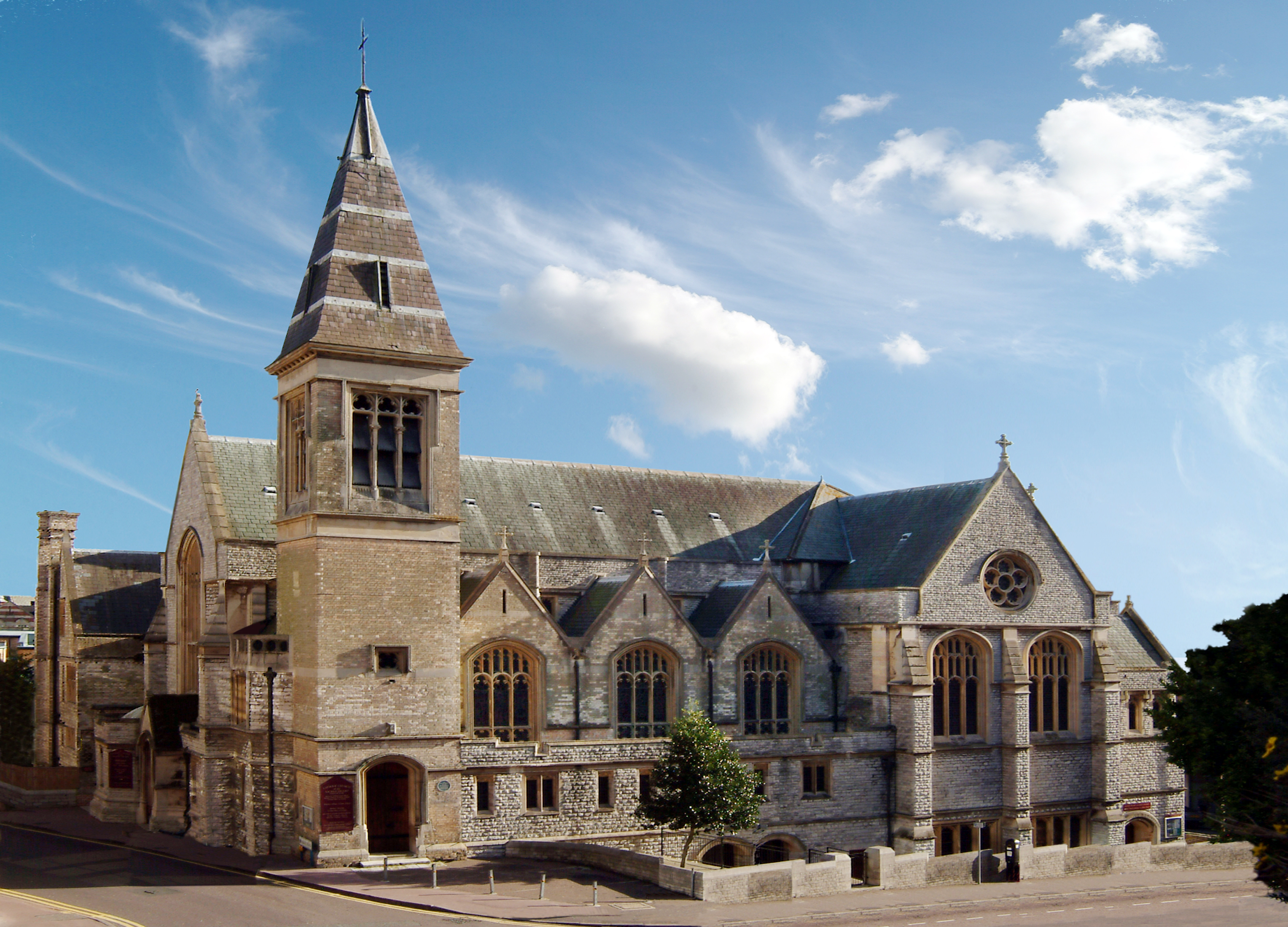
- Sacred Heart Church, Bournemouth

- Location in Dorset
- 50.7211°N 1.8787°W
- OS grid reference: SZ 08657 91278
- Location: Bournemouth, Dorset
- Country: England
- Denomination: Roman Catholic
- Website: http://www.bournemouthoratory.org.uk/

Architecture
- Functional status: Active
- Heritage designation: Grade II
- Designated: 20 October 1983
- Architect: Henry Clutton
- Style: English Gothic
- Completed: 1874

Administration
- Diocese: Portsmouth

Clergy
- Priest(s): Fr Peter Edwards C.O., Fr Francisco Hintikka C.O., Fr Gastón Zaniratto C.O.

The Catholic Church of the Sacred Heart, or Sacred Heart Church, is a Roman Catholic church in the seaside resort of Bournemouth, England. Located on Albert Road close to the town centre, it was the first Roman Catholic church built in Bournemouth and is part of the Diocese of Portsmouth. It has been designated a Grade II listed building by English Heritage. As of 2017, the parish is operated by members of the Oratory of Saint Philip Neri, and is referred to as the Bournemouth Oratory.

The church stands next door to the Bournemouth Daily Echo building and opposite the Norfolk Royale Hotel.

== History ==
=== Background ===
In the early 1800s Bournemouth was a 'new town'. Prior to becoming a desirable resort for bathing and taking the sea air, Bournemouth was no more than a small hamlet at the mouth of the River Bourne. With its attractive coastline and some seven miles of sandy beaches, it soon gave rise to a number of hotels and guest-houses to accommodate the increasing number of visitors. The development of the town was to be accelerated by the growth of a more efficient railway system, transporting many more people to this popular coastal destination. Initial arrangements for Catholic services were somewhat ad hoc but the increase in the number of affluent visitors led to improved facilities.

=== Early Church Services ===
Assembly Rooms behind the Belle Vue Hotel on the present site of the Pavilion Theatre were used at different times for Catholic and Congregationalist services and as a synagogue. The first recorded Mass was in 1861–62 when Mrs Washington Hibbert of Dover Street, London, spent the winter and established a private chapel at the hotel. The Mass was said by Fr Thomas Mochler SJ, who came from Lymington, the nearest church in the Diocese of Southwark. From 1863 to 1865 Lady Catherine Petre undertook the upkeep of the chapel. During the winter 1865–1866 Thomas Weld Blundell kept a private chapel at Walton House, Richmond Hill. From 1866 until 1867 Lord Edward Fitzalan Howard kept a private chapel at Brunstath on the East Cliff. Throughout this period Masses were attended dominantly by affluent visitors coming for the winter. There was first only one permanent Catholic resident, Sergeant Maurice O’Connell, drill sergeant of the 4th Hants Volunteers, but Catholics from a wide area attended. O’Connell was succeeded by Thomas Long as the one permanent Catholic resident. When the gentry were away Catholics travelled in a horse-drawn omnibus to St Mary's Church, then in the Old Town of Poole.

=== Jesuits ===
In October 1869 two Jesuit priests Fr James Brownbill and Fr James Eccles were sent from Farm Street, London, and opened a public wooden chapel in Astney Lodge, Richmond Hill, on the site of the house of Dr Fall which had partly burnt down. In 1870 a small wooden church opened on the present Sacred Heart site which was bought with the help of Lady Herbert of Lea and Mr O’Connell. Mrs Brymer presented a harmonium. Baptisms and weddings were recorded from 1872.

Fr Brownbill was the first parish priest until he retired in 1870. He was succeeded by Fr Maurice Mann who was alone after the death of Fr Eccles in 1871 until Fr A. Dignam SJ joined him. While alone Fr Mann had problems saying the number of Masses the congregation needed; the bishop allowed him to say two Sunday Masses during the winter season but not at other times.

In summer 1873 the nave of the new permanent building designed by Henry Clutton opened under Fr Dignam; in that year Fr Meagher became parish priest. Aisles and the present tower were added and the church was solemnly opened on 5 February 1875, with a blessing by Dr James Dannell, Bishop of Southwark. The building was of yellow / white bricks with Bath stone dressings at the doors and windows. In 1875, the bell of 10 cwts 0 quarters 171 lbs was installed by the Whitechapel Bell Foundry; a bill of £141.0s.6d for its supply was received. It was fitted for change ringing but hung alone for over a century.

Mrs Brymer gave the High Altar and stained glass windows of the four evangelists. Baroness von Hugel gave the brass altar rails.

For a time one of the Windsor Cottages on the site was used as a presbytery. The congregation at both the temporary chapel and the permanent building included, as a schoolboy, Rafael Merry del Val, son of the Secretary to the Spanish Embassy in London, who was to become a Cardinal and Secretary of State to Pope Pius X. The future cardinal attended St Aloysius School and later took French lessons from French nuns; he took his first communion at Sacred Heart Church in 1872.

=== Expansion ===
Following the creation of the new diocese of Portsmouth in 1882 enlargement work began in 1888 and more actively from April 1896 under the parish priest Fr Cooney SJ and the architect A.J.Pilkington. The completed church was blessed at a midnight Mass on 31 December 1900 also celebrating the start of the new century; in this process a new nave and clerestory, a confessional and work room block and an extension to the house were constructed and changes made to the Albert Road facade. A sacristy was constructed possibly later. The style was based on early French Gothic as in Clutton's original design, faced externally with Swanage stone with freestone dressings. The 1888–1900 works also included a central tower but it did not achieve the planned height.

=== Developments ===
In April 1888 the Empress Elizabeth of Austria (known as "Sisi"), wife of Franz Josef I, stayed in Bournemouth for 10 days. Her daughter the Archduchess Marie Valerie attended 8 am Sunday mass at Sacred Heart; the Empress stayed in her hotel with a cold.

Lady Georgiana Fullerton, granddaughter of the 5th Duke of Devonshire, worshipped for many years at Sacred Heart where there is a plaque to her memory. At first she stayed at Stewart's Hotel, now the Norfolk Royale, with her mother and later with her husband Alexander from Lymington; in 1876 she and her husband moved to a house Ayrfield, in St Peter's Road. In 1873 she founded St Joseph's Home in Madeira Road for poor Catholics from London suffering from tuberculosis, supported by other ladies including the then Duchess of Norfolk. After her death in 1885 it closed but in 1888 her husband funded the opening of another home in Branksome Wood Road served by the Sisters of Mercy. Lady Georgiana also supported education: in 1871 the Religious of the Cross opened a convent and a girls' boarding school. Additionally some classes were taught by lady volunteers in one of the Windsor Cottages on the future site of the church but in autumn 1877 St Joseph's School opened at the junction of Madeira and Lansdowne Roads; in 1878 it moved to Avenue Road and in 1879 it was renamed St Walburga's. The Religious of the Cross took over the teaching in 1880. The school moved again to Yelverton Road with the help of Lady Georgiana's husband; the Sisters of Mercy took it over in 1887.

Lady Georgiana's friends included Baroness Pauline von Hügel the founder of Corpus Christi School and benefactress of Corpus Christi Church, Boscombe, who lived with her mother and a friend Ellen Redmayne on Richmond Hill before moving to Boscombe. Father William Anderton, former secretary to his uncle Cardinal Henry Manning, spent a year c1876 at Sacred Heart Church. Paul Verlaine the French poet who worked as an art master at St Aloysius School from 1876 to 1877 visited the presbytery and went with his pupils to the church.

Aubrey Beardsley moved to Boscombe in 1896. He was visited by Father Charles de Lapasture SJ from Sacred Heart Church who was to take charge of the new Corpus Christi Church in 1896. In 1897 Beardsley moved to the house Muriel in Exeter Road, Bournemouth. His art patron friend Marc-Andre Raffalovich arranged for Father David Bearne from Sacred Heart to visit and Beardsley attended when his health allowed. In a period of poor health Father Bearne came to his house and received him into the Catholic Church. Two days later he received his first communion at home. That April he moved to Menton on the French Riviera where he died the following year.

When Lady Cromer wife of the British diplomat Lord Cromer died in Cairo in 1898 Bournemouth was chosen for the funeral in view of her happy memories of visits to the town with her children. Both her sons attended the funeral service at Sacred Heart; her husband could not attend. When he died in 1917 he was buried with her in the Wimborne Road cemetery. In 1901 Adeline Sergeant the novelist and Fabian, moved to Agincourt House, Albert Road, and attended Sacred Heart Church. On 10 July 1910 Archbishop (later Cardinal) Francis Bourne of Westminster attended a Mass at Sacred Heart also attended by the Lord Mayor of London, marking the first centenary of the town of Bournemouth. On 27 December 1917 the leading Belgian composer Joseph Jongen, who was staying in Bournemouth as a refugee during the German occupation of his country, played the organ at Sacred Heart; he found the 26-stop Brindley and Foster organ fit for his 'Chant de May'.

On 7 March 1922 a memorial in the town hall to officers of Bournemouth Council in the First World War was dedicated by the rector of Sacred Heart who was the chaplain to the then mayor, a Catholic; the council vetoed a vicar and Congregational minister from taking part, so the Catholic acted alone: "The father is to be congratulated on handling a difficult situation with courtesy and prudence".

In 1940 the young comedian Tony Hancock, who lived with his parents at their Bournemouth hotel – the Railway Hotel in Holdenhurst Road, was booked to appear before an audience of troops, then numerous in the town. His performance was too saucy even for the audience. He was told to leave: "Thank you Mr Hancock, we won’t require your services any more. We shall have to fumigate the stage".

On 23 May 1943 there took place the worst bombing raid on Bournemouth in the Second World War. Beales' department store was destroyed, as were hotels containing servicemen from overseas assembling for the invasion of France. The Punshon Methodist Church, across Post Office Road from Sacred Heart, and the adjoining Central Hotel were demolished. Sacred Heart Church suffered blast damage resulting in cracks in its structure.

J R R Tolkien and his wife Edith took regular holidays at the Miramar Hotel, Bournemouth, from the 1950s and attended Sunday Masses at Sacred Heart. In 1968 they bought a bungalow in Branksome Park. Edith died in 1971 and Tolkien in 1973. In 2005 on the 50th anniversary of publication of The Lord of the Rings their daughter Priscilla attended a Mass at Sacred Heart and read one of her father's poems.

On 24 May 1962 Pontifical High Mass was celebrated in Sacred Heart Church by Archbishop / Bishop King to mark the centenary of the first Mass in Bournemouth which had been said at the Belle Vue Hotel; clergy attended from Portsmouth and Plymouth dioceses; the Claretian Missionaries from Highcliffe Castle sang. The sermon was preached by the Jesuit priest and author Bernard Basset who stayed at Sacred Heart from 1962 to 1969; his brother Edmund was parish priest. In 1969 the Jesuits handed the church to secular clergy of the Portsmouth diocese. In the mid-1970s the sanctuary was reordered following the Second Vatican Council and the church was consecrated by Bishop Derek Worlock. Later the presbytery was reorganised with a view to housing retired priests.

In 1982–83 substantial stone cleaning was carried out. More significantly in addition to the existing Bourdon bell which was restored a peal of six bells was added. This gives Sacred Heart a rare feature in Catholic churches.

Sacred Heart was the first Catholic church in Bournemouth; now it is one of nine. Apart from the two in the Plymouth diocese which passed into the Borough of Bournemouth in the 1930s and Southbourne which in early days was served by a retired priest from Christchurch they all stem from the Jesuit establishment of Sacred Heart; the Jesuits now maintain Corpus Christi parish in Boscombe.

== Architecture ==
The church was designed by Henry Clutton in 1872–74, then considerably enlarged by A. J. Pilkington in 1896–98. It is now designated by English Heritage as a grade II listed building.
