= Alum Chine =

Coastal gorge in Bournemouth, England

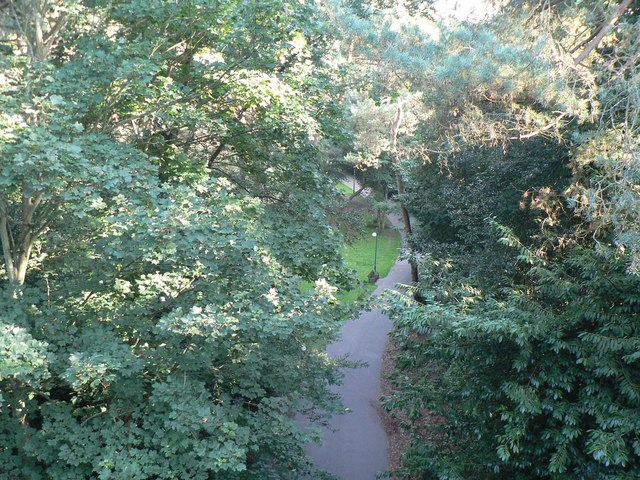
- Alum Chine

- Location within Dorset

Geography
- Location: Bournemouth, Dorset.
- Coordinates: 50.714°N 1.900°W
- Interactive map of Alum Chine

Alum Chine is the largest chine in Bournemouth, England. The gorge was crossed by a suspension bridge by the early part of the twentieth century.

== History ==
In early maps the place was often transposed with Durley Chine.

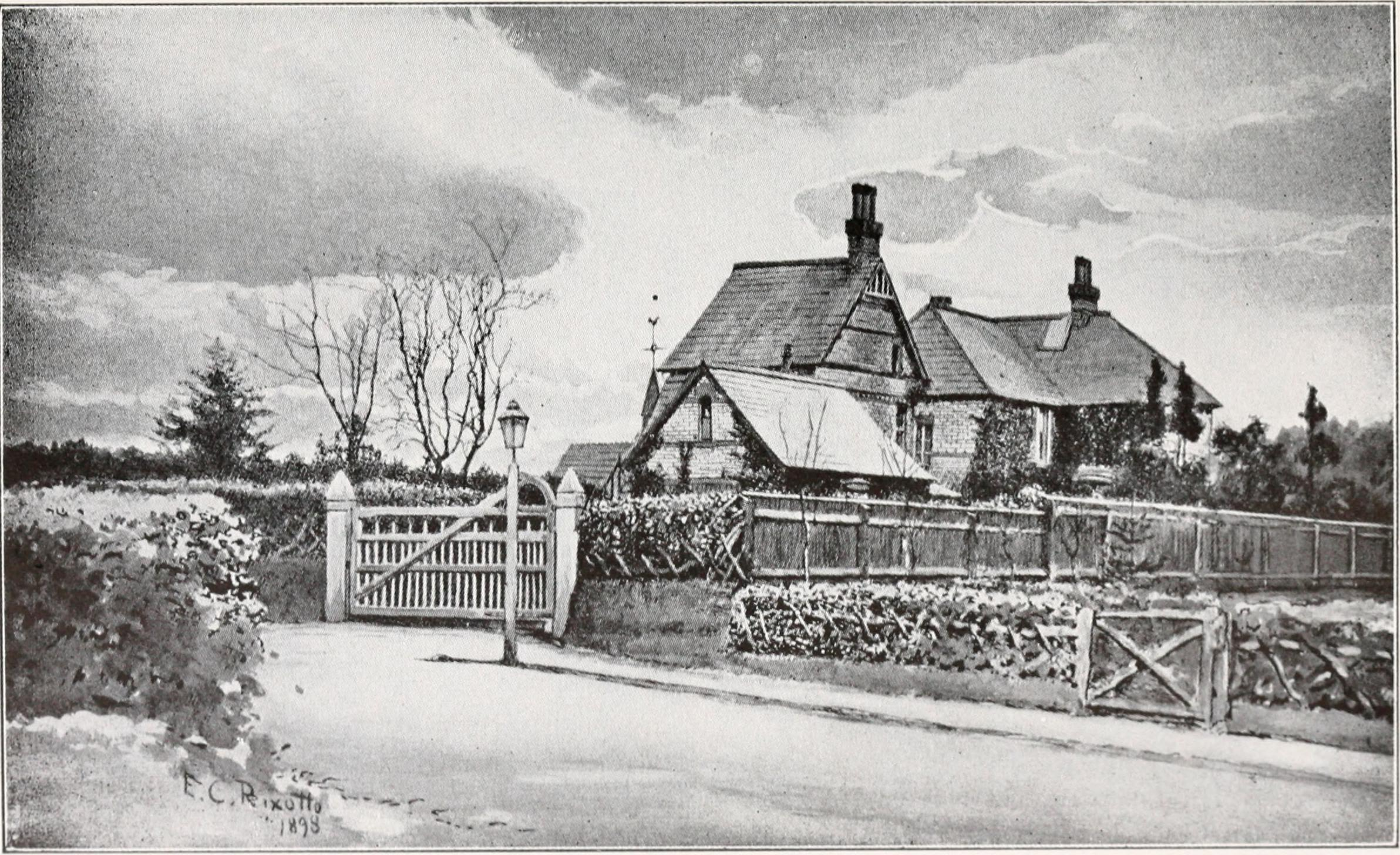
Robert Louis Stevenson's house Skerryvore

During the Bournemouth Blitz in the Second World War, Robert Louis Stevenson's house Skerryvore, at the head of the chine, was severely damaged by bombs during a destructive and lethal raid on Bournemouth on the night of 15–16 November 1940. Despite a campaign to save it, the building was demolished.

== Namesakes ==
The chine gives its name to a number of local features, Alum Chine Beach being the most obvious, and to an area of the town and a telephone exchange.

A ship, the Alum Chine, destroyed in a dynamite explosion in 1913 was also named after the chine.
