= West Cliff Baptist Church =

Church in Bournemouth, Dorset, England

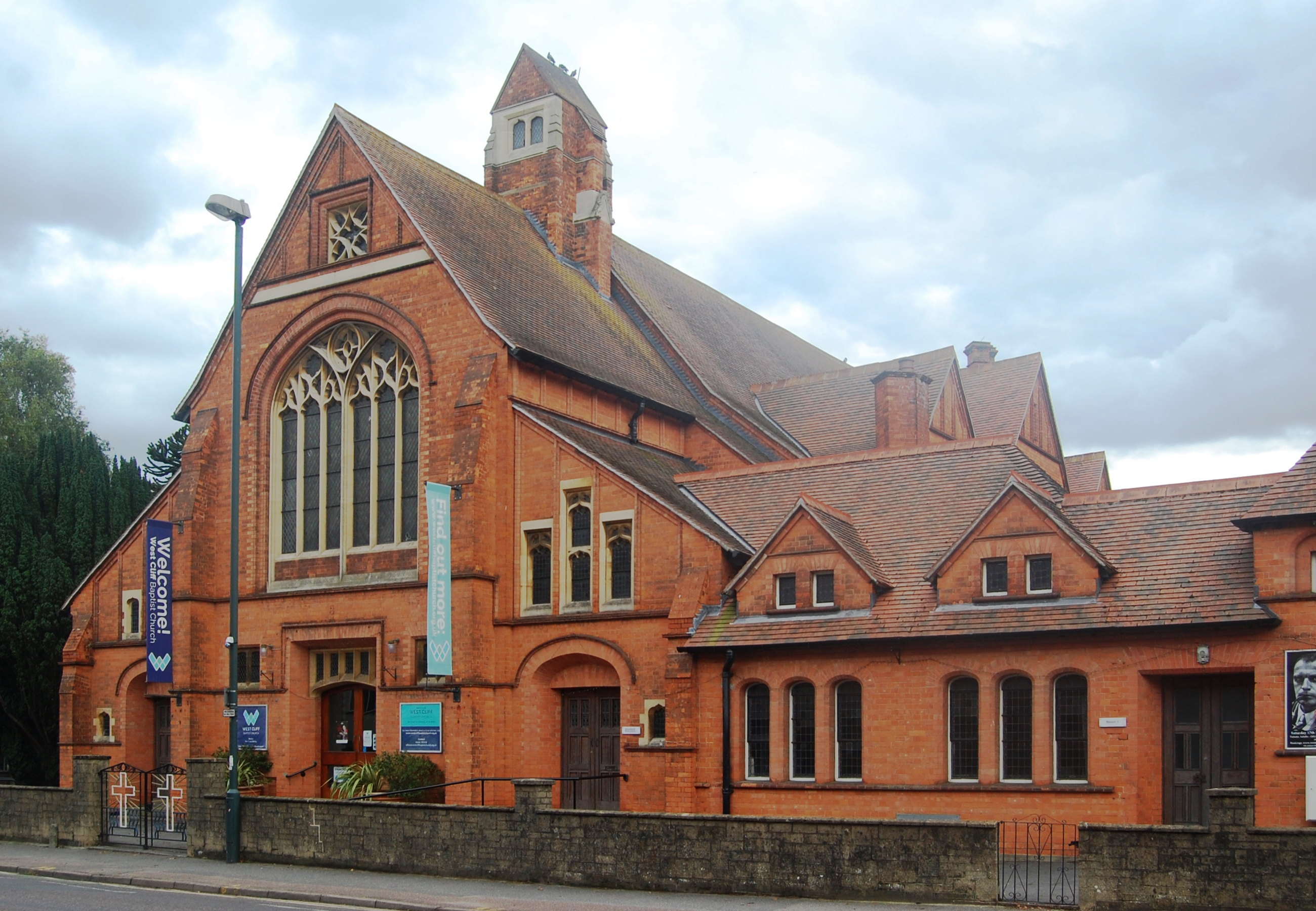
- West Cliff Baptist Church in 2022

Religion
- Affiliation: Baptists
- Ecclesiastical or organisational status: active

Location
- Location: West Cliff, Bournemouth, Dorset, England
- Interactive map of West Cliff Baptist Church
- Coordinates: 50.722221°N 1.900146°W

Architecture
- Type: Church
- Style: English Gothic architecture
- Completed: 1891

Website
- www.westcliffbaptistchurch.org.uk

The West Cliff Baptist Church is a Grade II listed church in the West Cliff area of Bournemouth, Dorset, England.

== History ==
The West Cliff Baptist Church, which contained a school, was constructed in 1891.

== See also ==
- List of churches in Bournemouth
- List of Baptist churches
