= Lansdowne, Bournemouth =

Coordinates: 50°43′18.9″N 1°51′59.2″W

Lansdowne
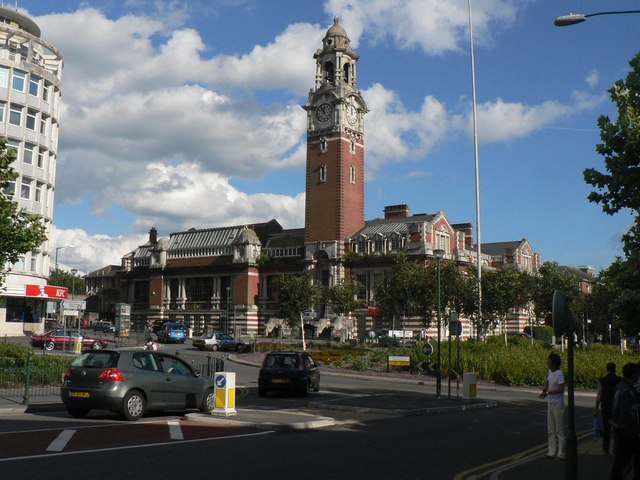
- Lansdowne roundabout

- Location within Dorset
- Unitary authority: Bournemouth, Christchurch and Poole
- Ceremonial county: Dorset
- Region: South West
- Country: England
- Sovereign state: United Kingdom
- Post town: BOURNEMOUTH
- Postcode district: BH
- Police: Dorset
- Fire: Dorset and Wiltshire
- Ambulance: South Western
- UK Parliament: Bournemouth East

Lansdowne is a suburb of Bournemouth. It occupies the north-east part of the main built-up area around Bournemouth Town Centre.

It is home to Lansdowne Campus of Bournemouth University, which is where the Faculty of Health and Social Sciences are based. Lansdowne is also home to lots of Student Accommodation, hosting several thousand BU students.

== History ==
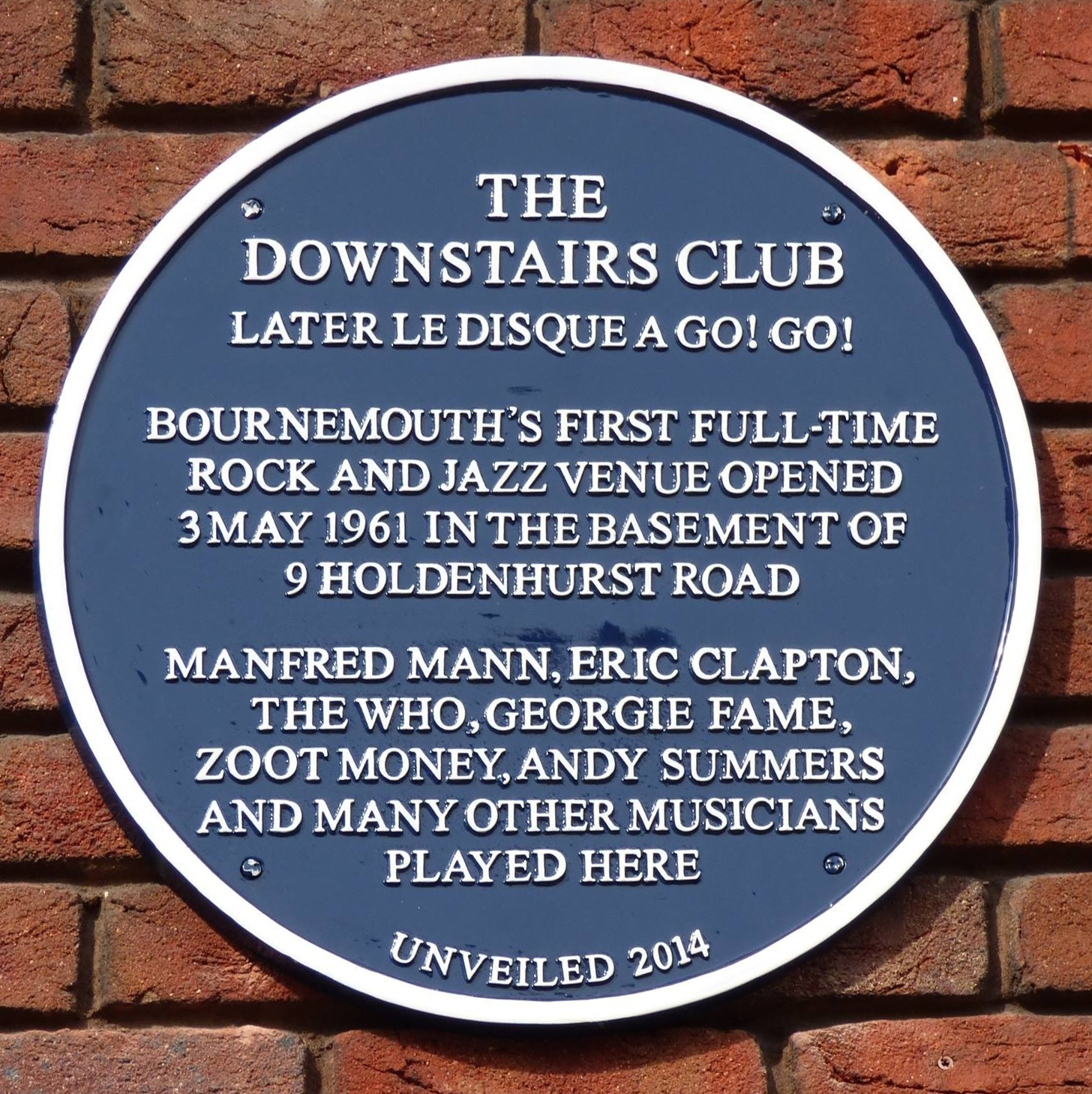
The Downstairs Club

The area was its named for the suburb of Lansdown, Bath known for the Georgian Lansdown Crescent.

Bournemouth and Poole College has its largest campus here, the college was originally the Bournemouth Municipal College which opened in 1913. It is a listed building and is known for its clock tower (said to be an 'eyesore' when first built). A public library was part of the building until 2002. A small number of 'Horsa huts' were built in the 1940s and a large three-floor extension opened in 1957. In 1960 it took over the former Bournemouth School for Girls buildings which were two old Victorian houses (Ascham House [listed building] and Woodcote) which were used as the school when it opened in 1917.

On 3 May 1961 The Downstairs Club, Bournemouth's first full-time rock and jazz club, opened in Holdenhurst road just off Lansdowne roundabout.

== Redevelopment ==
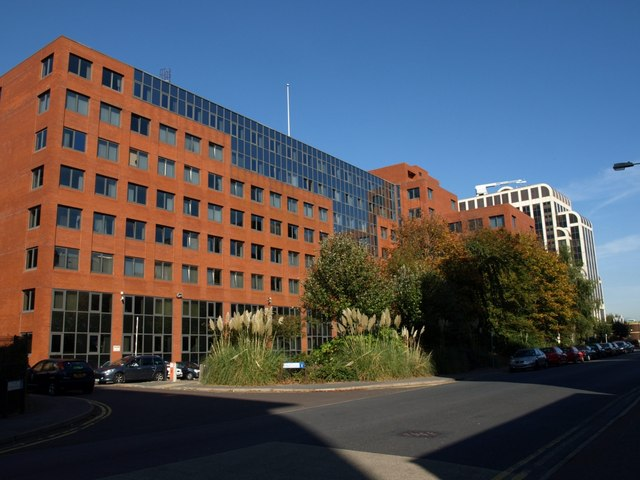
Holland House was home to the Inland Revenue. It is planned to be demolished in 2024.

In 2020, the Buzz Bingo in Lansdowne was closed. In 2023, plans for residential redevelopment were announced.

In November 2023, plans were announced to demolish Holland House in Oxford Road and replace it with what is planned to be Bournemouth’s tallest building. 500 homes are planned.
