= West Cliff, Bournemouth =

Suburb of Bournemouth, Dorset, England

Coordinates: 50°43.0′N 1°52.9′W

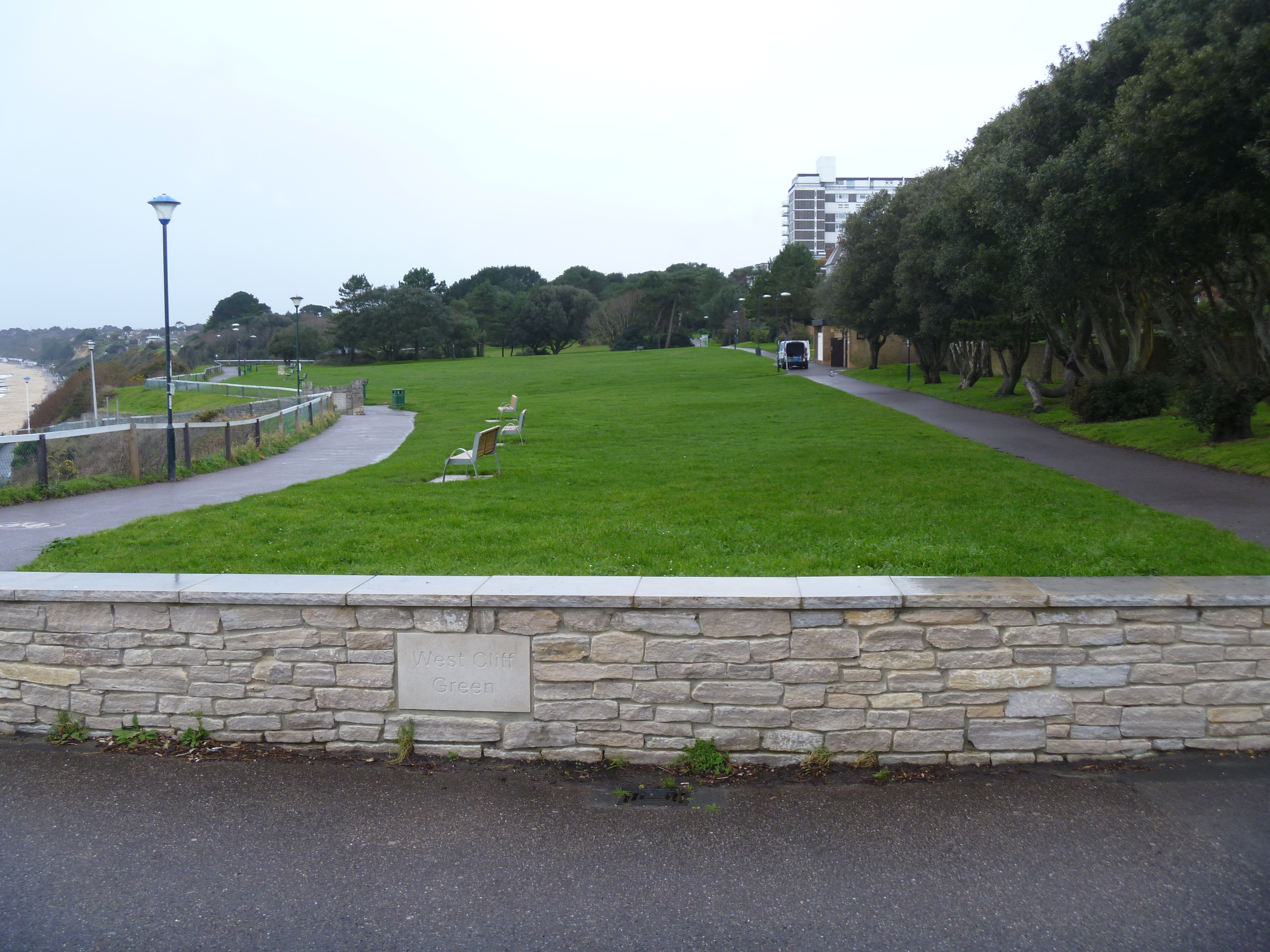
West Cliff Green, Bournemouth.

West Cliff is a suburb of Bournemouth, Dorset, England. West Cliff is south of Westbourne and east of Branksome in Poole.

== Politics ==
West Cliff is part of the Bournemouth West constituency.

== Religion ==
- West Cliff Baptist Church

== Hotel ==
The West Cliff Hotel received a £1.4million refurbishment in 2019. In August 2023, it was announced the hotel would be demolished for flats.

== Transport ==
The area is served by the West Cliff Railway.
