= Bournemouth town centre =

Area of Bournemouth, Dorset, England

Coordinates: 50°43.2′N 1°52.8′W

Bournemouth town centre is an area of Bournemouth, Dorset. The town centre is the central business district and is located near the coast between West Cliff and East Cliff.

== History ==
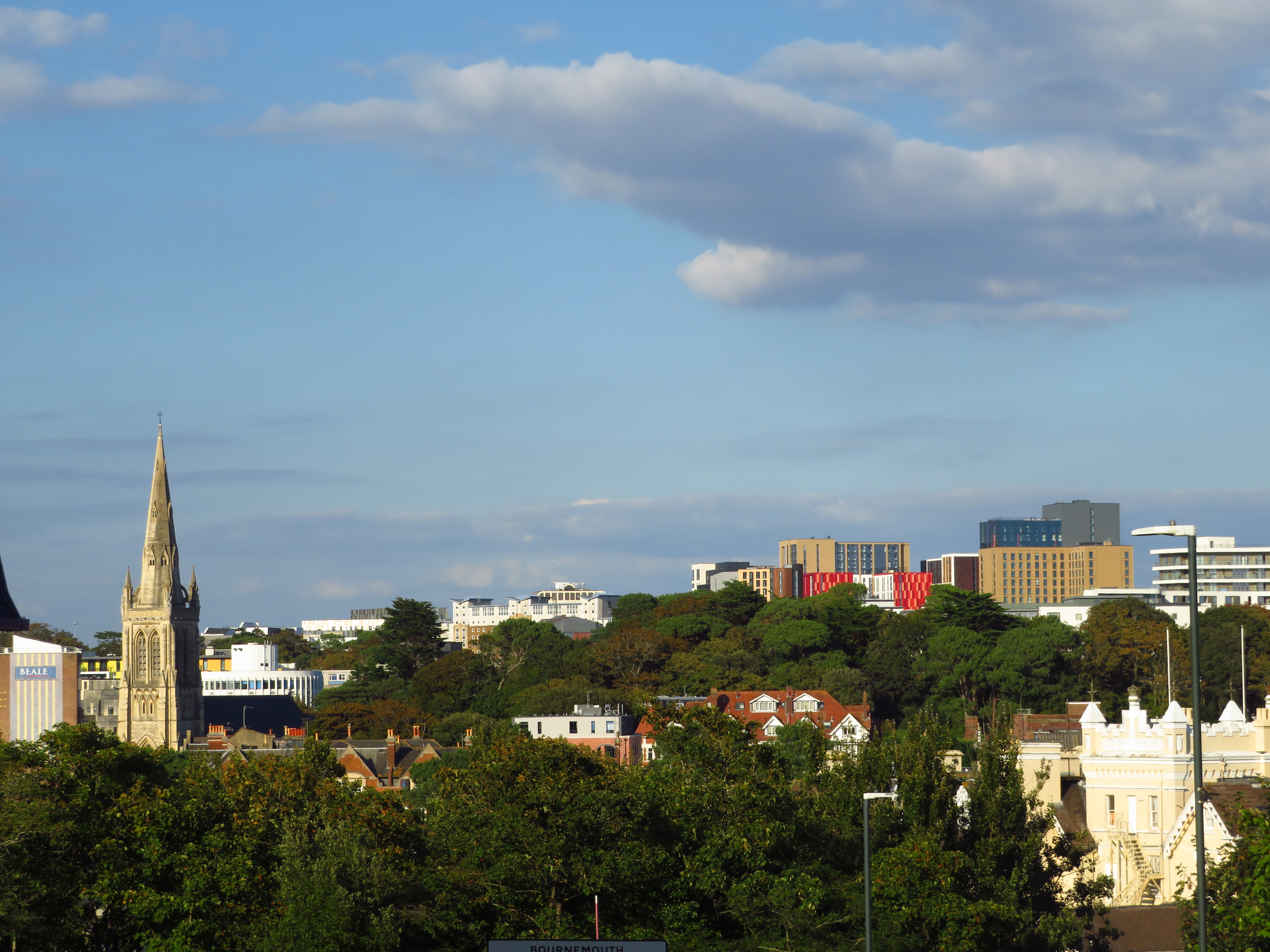
The view of Bournemouth town centre from West Cliff. Lansdowne can be seen in the distance, and St. Peter's Church on the left.

In 1908, the Bournemouth Tramway accident killed seven people in the town centre.

The COVID-19 pandemic in the United Kingdom affected business in the town centre. The New Look store in the town centre was scheduled to close in February 2022 after 21 years. The Wilko store was due to close in the same month. A shift from retail towards entertainment and eating out is predicted to be the future of the town centre. On 13 March 2022, Bournemouth's House of Fraser closed for the final time. The store, which first opened in 1873, was Bournemouth's last remaining department store after the flagship Beales closed in 2020, and Debenhams closed in 2021. Despite this Bournemouth, Christchurch and Poole Council were reportedly optimistic about the future of the town centre.

== Areas ==
The town centre is where The Square is.

Areas include Richmond Hill and Lansdowne.

== Notable buildings ==
- Royal Exeter Hotel (1812)
- Royal Bath Hotel (1838)
- Norfolk Royale Hotel (1850)
- Sacred Heart Church (1874)
- St Michael's Church (1875)
- St Swithun's Church (1877)
- St Peter's Church (1879)
- Bournemouth Town Hall (1885)
- St. Andrew's Church (1891)
- Bournemouth and Poole College (1913)
- Pavilion Theatre (1929)
- Bournemouth International Centre (1984)

== Politics ==
Bournemouth town centre is part of the Bournemouth Central ward for elections to the Bournemouth, Christchurch and Poole Council. The same ward elected councillors to the former Bournemouth Borough Council.

The town centre is also part of the Bournemouth West parliamentary constituency for elections to the House of Commons of the United Kingdom. The current MP, since 2014, is the Labours Jessica Toale.

== See also ==
- Castlepoint Shopping Centre, in north Bournemouth
