= St. Andrew's Church, Bournemouth =

St. Andrew's Church, Bournemouth may refer to:

- St. Andrew's Church, Exeter Road
- St. Andrew's Church, Kinson
- St. Andrew's Church, Richmond Hill

== See also ==
- St. Andrew's Church (disambiguation)
