= Alder Hills =

Suburb in Dorset, England

Coordinates: 50°44′21″N 1°54′56″W

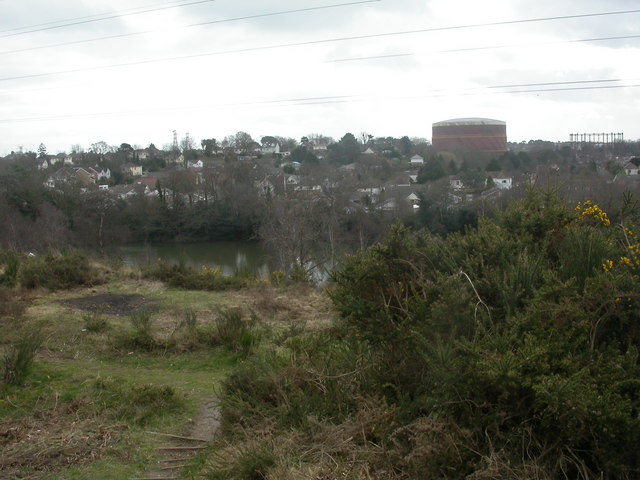
- Alder Hills Nature Reserve

- Location within Dorset
- Civil parish: Poole
- Unitary authority: Bournemouth, Christchurch and Poole
- Ceremonial county: Dorset
- Region: South West
- Country: England
- Sovereign state: United Kingdom
- Post town: BOURNEMOUTH
- Postcode district: BH
- Police: Dorset
- Fire: Dorset and Wiltshire
- Ambulance: South Western
- UK Parliament: Bournemouth West

Alder Hills is a suburb that crosses the boundaries of Bournemouth and Poole, in the Bournemouth, Christchurch and Poole district, in the ceremonial county of Dorset, England. It is south of Wallisdown, east of Alderney and north of Branksome and Parkstone.

== History ==
In July 2019, a huge heathland fire occurred in the area. It was reported that it could take 20 years to recover after fire. In August 2020 there was another fire.

== Environment ==
The Alder Hills Nature Reserve is in the area. The reserve is noted for its lizard and dragonfly populations. In 1984 it was designated as a Site of Special Scientific Interest by Natural England. The reserve is centred on a disused clay pit which has been converted into a fishing lake. The lake is fed by the Kinson Brook flowing in a culvert beneath Alder Road and drains through another culvert into Coy Pond Gardens.

== Transport ==
Alder Road is one of the most important roads connecting Bournemouth and Poole. The road begins at Wallisdown Roundabout at Kinson Road and travels south to Branksome and Parkstone.

== Facilities ==
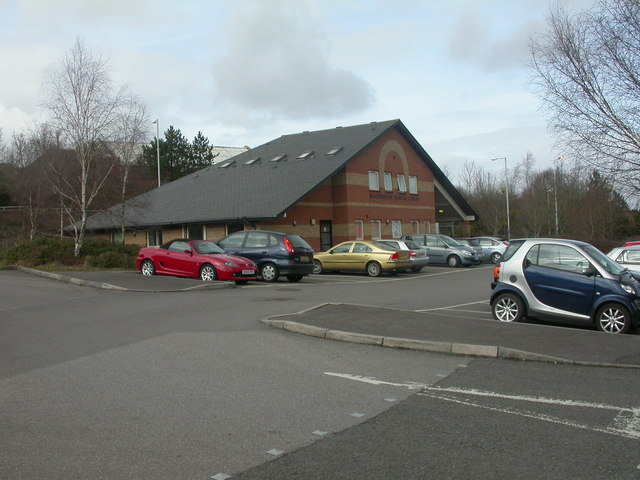
Heatherview Medical Centre.

Alder Hills is served by the Heatherview Medical Centre.

== Politics ==
Alder Hills falls within two parliamentary constituencies for elections to the House of Commons. Part is within the Poole constituency, and is represented by the Labour Party politician Neil Duncan-Jordan. The other part is within the Bournemouth West constituency represented by Labour's Jessica Toale.

== Gallery ==
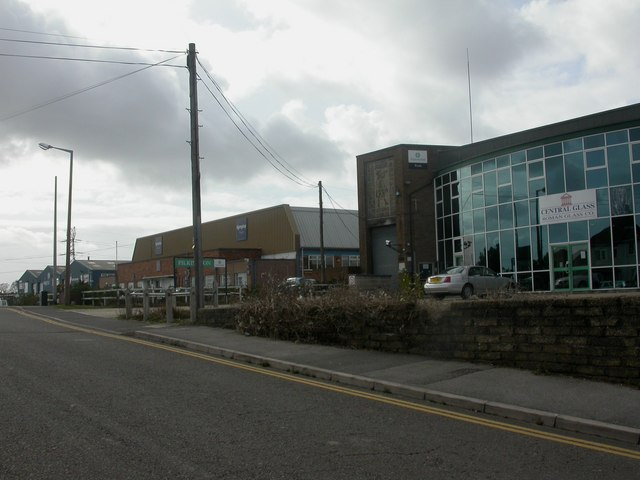
Alder Hills Industrial Estate

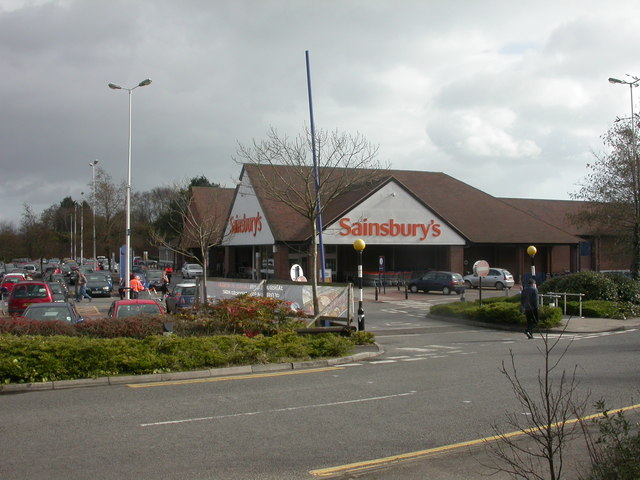
Sainsbury's in Alder Hills Retail Park.

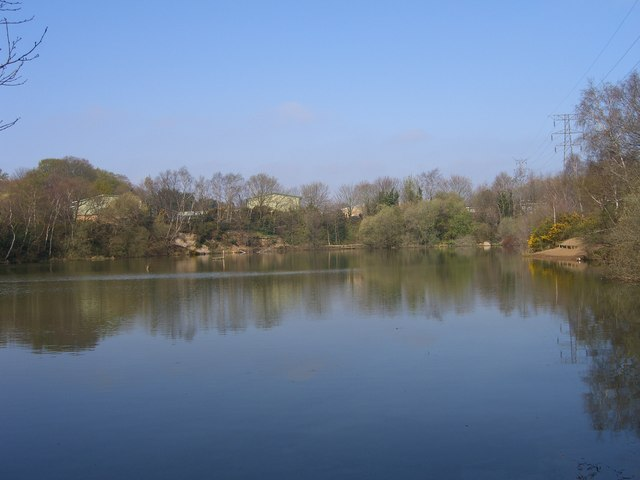
Pond on Alder Hills Nature Reserve

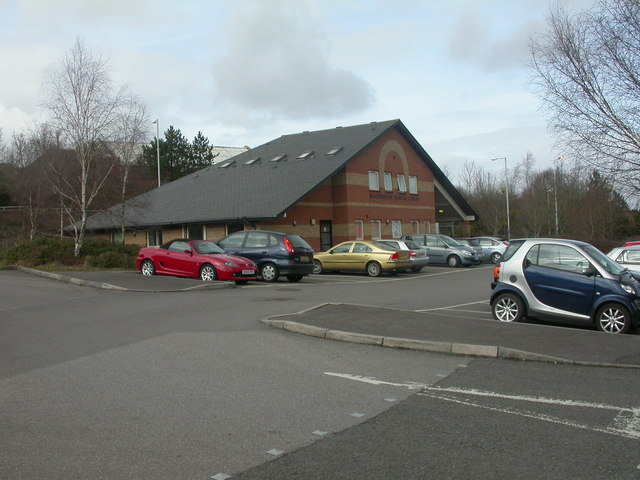
Heatherview medical centre

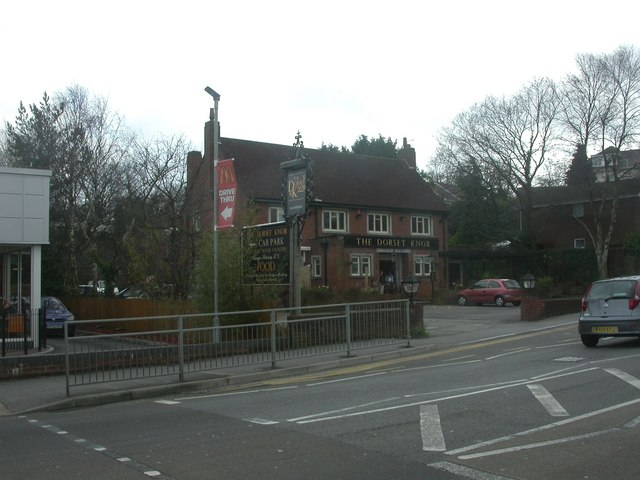
The Dorset Knob pub in 2009 (it has since been redeveloped)

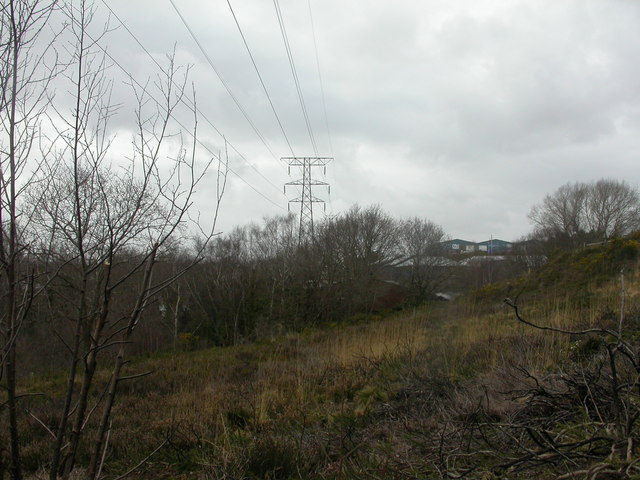
Alder Hills electricity pylons

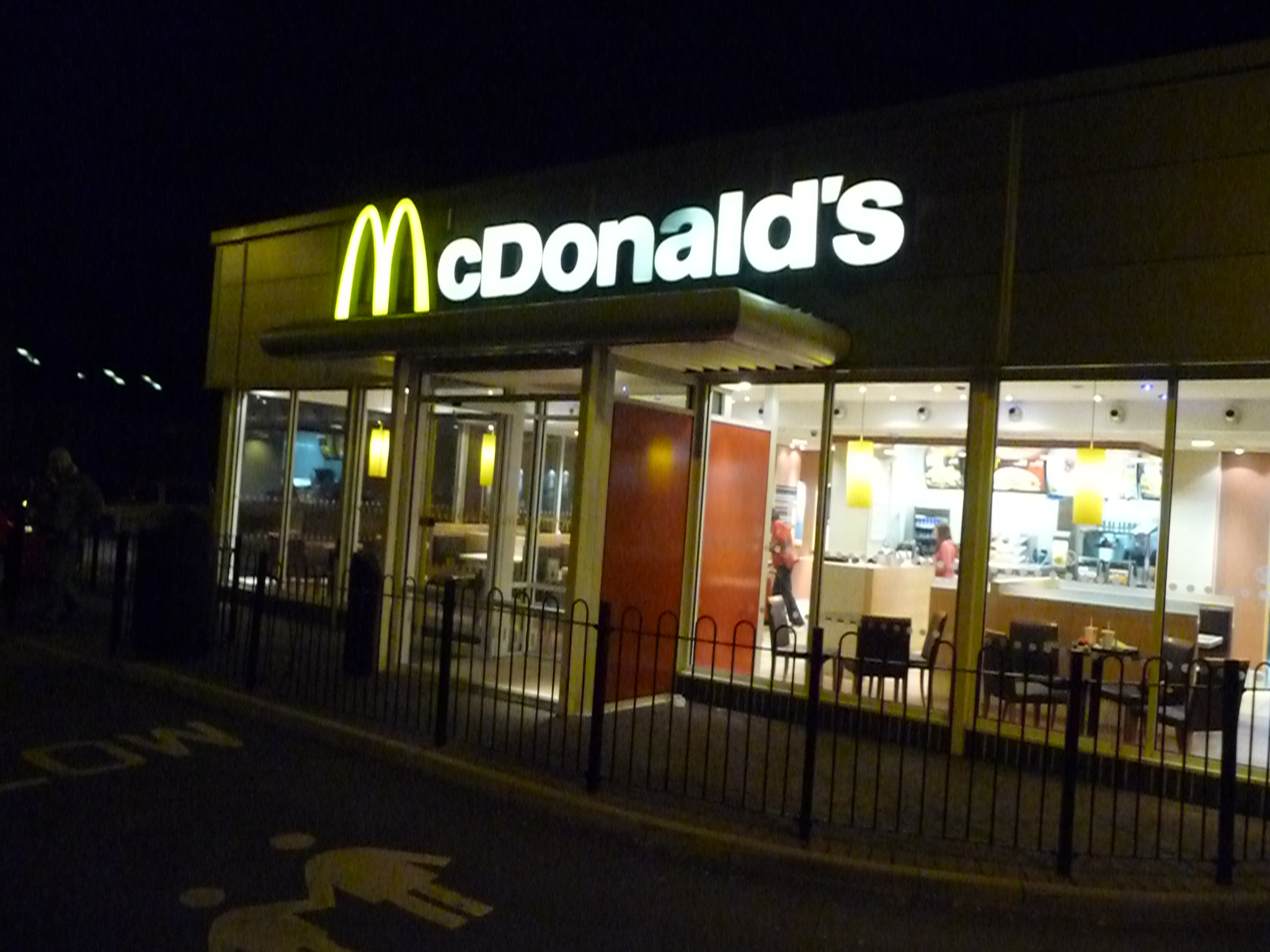
McDonald's at Alder Road, Poole

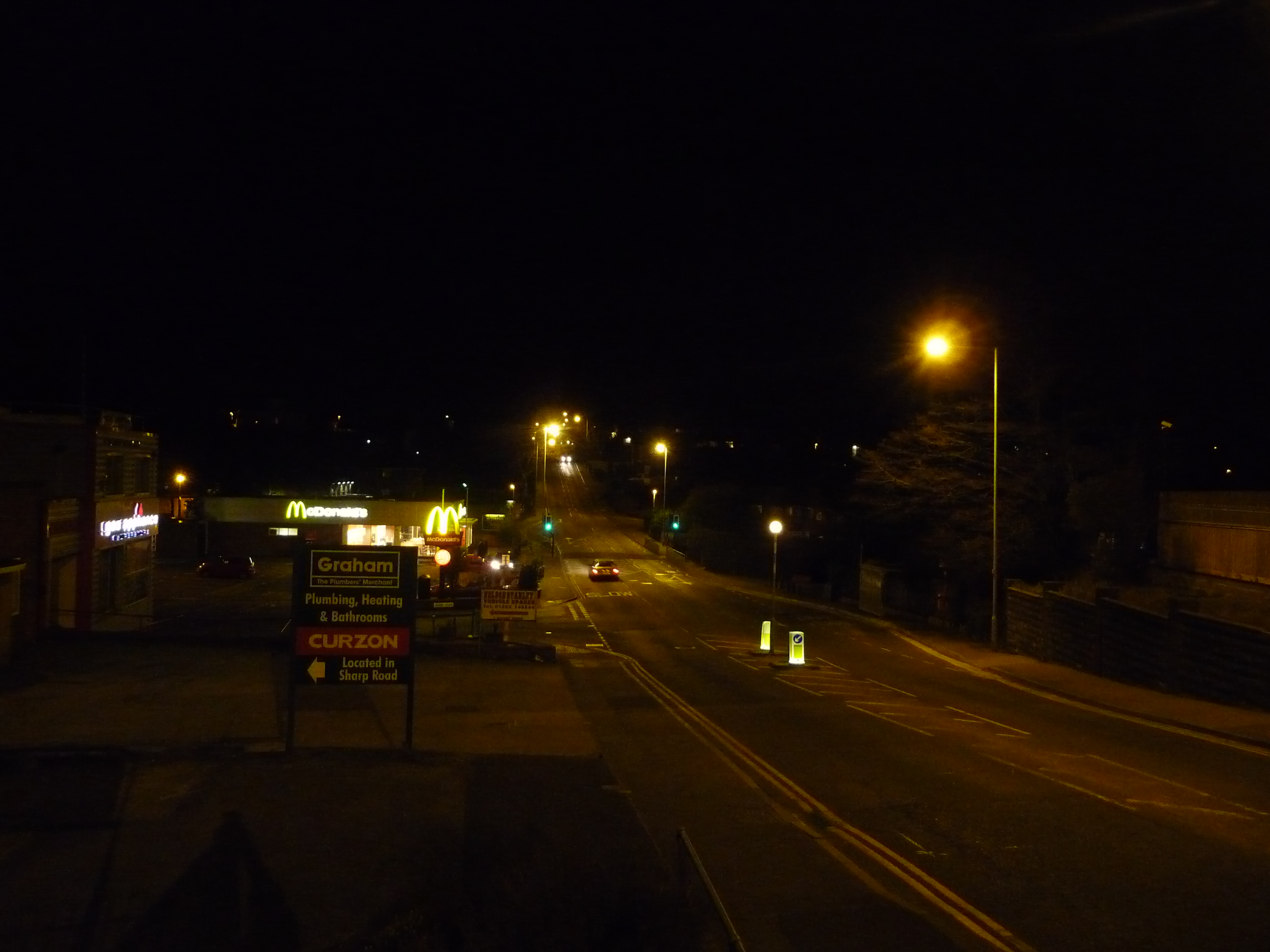
Alder Road in 2010

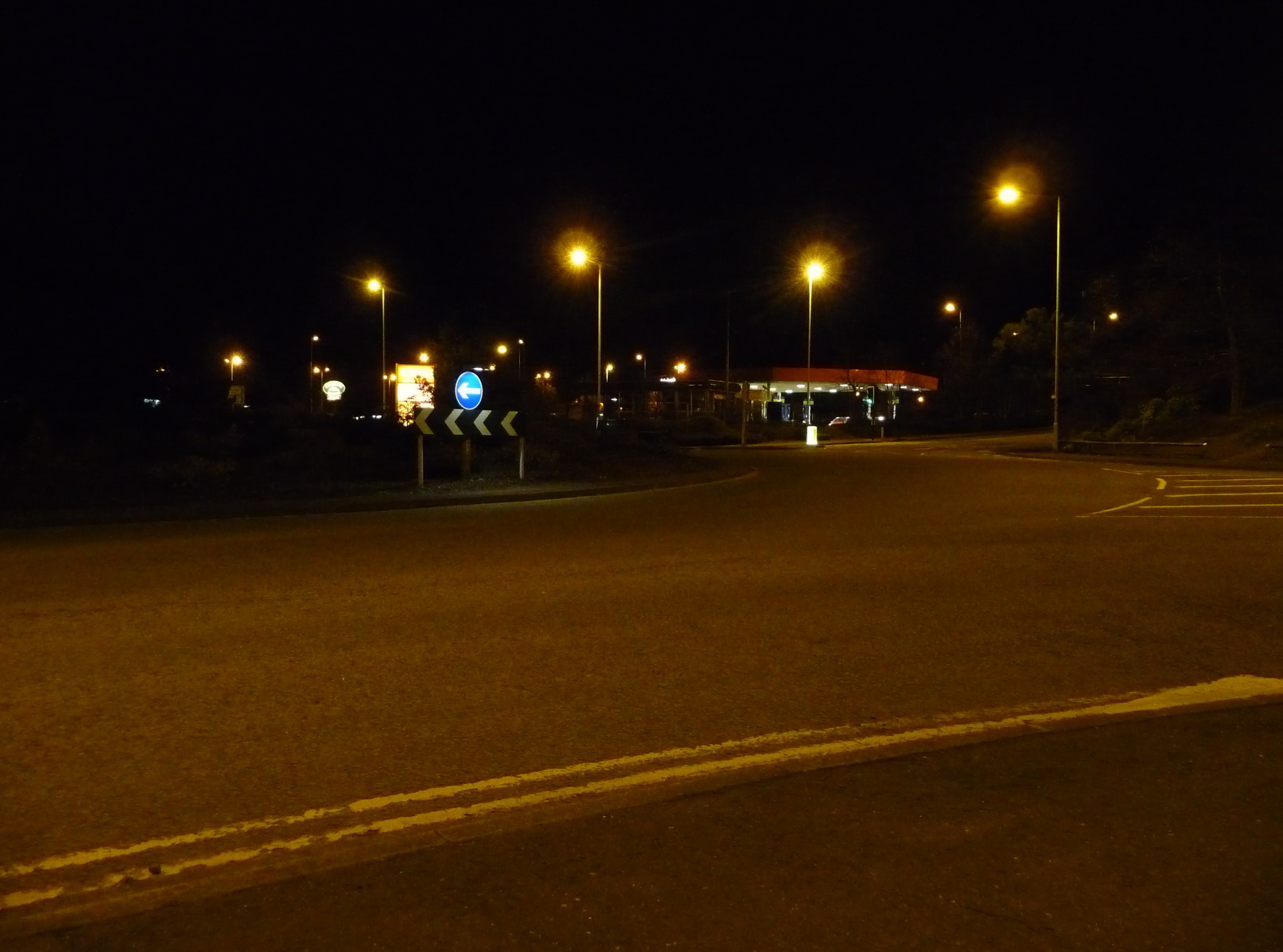
Alder Road Roundabout
