= Kinson Brook =

River in Dorset, England

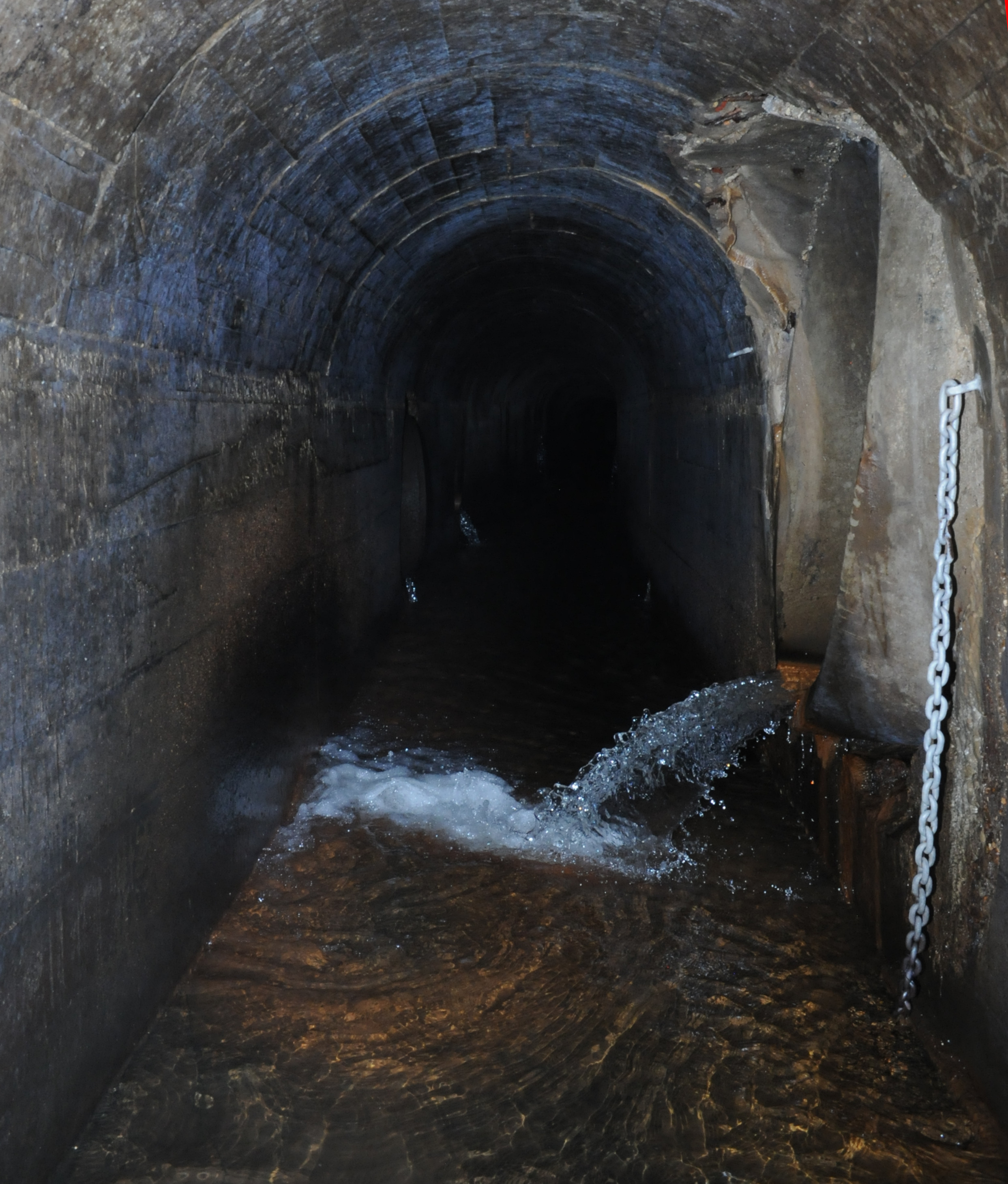
- Kinson Brook at its confluence with Withy Bed Bottom

- Location within Dorset

Location
- Country: United Kingdom
- County: Dorset

Physical characteristics
- Source
  - location: Alderney
- Mouth: River Bourne
  - coordinates: 50°43′47″N 1°54′21″W
- Discharge
  - location: Coy Pond Gardens

Kinson Brook is a 3.4-kilometre (2.1 mi) long tributary of the River Bourne whose course lies entirely within Poole in Dorset, England. It takes its name from the parish of Kinson, whose borders originally included the stream's valley. 2.5 kilometres of the brook have been culverted and built over.

== Course ==
Kinson Brook rises as two separate streams from beneath Herbert Avenue which converge at a pond in Bourne Valley Park. It flows through the park in an artificial open channel which was excavated in 2006 as part of a sustainable urban drainage system and feeds an artificial fishing pond. It sinks through a grate into a culvert near the park's entrance on Monkton Crescent, through which it flows for a kilometre beneath Alder Crescent, Alder Road, and Cortree Close before appearing above ground again in the Alder Hills Local Nature Reserve.

The brook flows into Alder Hills Lake from the west and subsequently flows into another culvert near the lake's southern shore. It is then joined from the right by a small tributary called Withy Bed Bottom which flows beneath Branksome recreation ground. It emerges briefly from its culvert at the base of the railway embankment approaching the Bourne Valley Viaducts before flowing into another culvert that carries it below the railway line to Bournemouth Gardens, where it joins the River Bourne beneath a footbridge south of Coy Pond.

== History ==
Between 1863 and 1888, Kinson Brook served as the main water supply for the Bournemouth Gas & Water Works. Its water was filtered through sand just upstream of its confluence with Withy Bed Bottom and pumped to a reservoir near the junction of Alder Road and Ashley Road in Poole. From the reservoir, the water ran under gravity along Poole Road to supply customers in Bournemouth
