= Grade II* listed buildings in Bournemouth =

Bournemouth shown in Dorset

There are over 20,000 Grade II* listed buildings in England. This page is a list of these buildings in the district of Bournemouth in Dorset.

== List of buildings ==
Name	Location	Type	Completed (Note: The date given is the date used by Historic England as significant for the initial building or that of an important part in the structure's description.)	Date designated	Grid ref. (Note: The grid reference is based on the British national grid reference system, sometimes known as OSGB36, used by the Ordnance Survey.) Geo-coordinates	Entry number (Note: The "List Entry Number" is a unique number assigned to each listed building and scheduled monument by Historic England.)	Image
Bournemouth War Memorial with associated steps, enclosure and balustrade	Bournemouth	War memorial	1922	12 March 2014	SZ0843191322; 50°43′17″N 1°52′55″W	1418017	Bournemouth War Memorial with associated steps, enclosure and balustrade More images
Church of St Alban	Bournemouth	Church	1907–09	27 February 1976	SZ0966793231; 50°44′19″N 1°51′52″W	1152784	Church of St Alban More images
Church of St Ambrose	Bournemouth	Church	1898–1900	27 February 1976	SZ0714090871; 50°43′03″N 1°54′01″W	1108803	Church of St Ambrose More images
Church of St Andrew	Kinson	Church	13th century	5 May 1972	SZ0679596925; 50°46′19″N 1°54′18″W	1324727	Church of St Andrew More images
Church of St John the Evangelist	Boscombe	Church	1893–95	27 February 1976	SZ1105591713; 50°43′30″N 1°50′41″W	1152799	Church of St John the Evangelist More images
Church of St Michael (including tower)	Bournemouth	Church	1873–76	5 May 1952	SZ0794391197; 50°43′13″N 1°53′20″W	1324732	Church of St Michael (including tower) More images
House of Bethany	Bournemouth	House	1880	27 February 1976	SZ1085692112; 50°43′43″N 1°50′51″W	1108819	House of Bethany More images
Roman Catholic Church of the Annunciation	Bournemouth	Church	1905–06	27 February 1976	SZ0972493181; 50°44′17″N 1°51′49″W	1110033	Roman Catholic Church of the Annunciation More images
Russell-Cotes Art Gallery & Museum	Bournemouth	House	1894	1 August 1974	SZ0922290894; 50°43′03″N 1°52′15″W	1108857	Russell-Cotes Art Gallery & Museum More images

== See also ==
- Grade I listed buildings in Bournemouth
