= 1908 Bournemouth Tramway accident =

Fatal tram accident on 1 May 1908 in Bournemouth, England

- The fatal tramway disaster at Bournemouth: The overturned car (The Illustrated London News, 1908)

Details
- Date: 1 May 1908
- Location: Bournemouth, England
- Coordinates: 50.721266°N 1.883169°W
- Country: England
- Operator: Bournemouth Corporation Tramways
- Cause: Brake failure

Statistics
- Trains: 1
- Deaths: 7
- Injured: 26

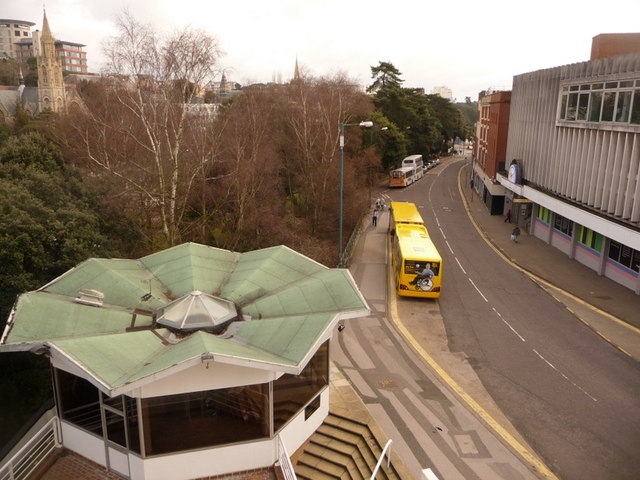
Avenue Road next to Bournemouth Gardens, the scene of the crash pictured in 2010.

The 1908 Bournemouth Tramway accident was a fatal tram accident which occurred on 1 May 1908 in the town of Bournemouth, Hampshire (but now in Dorset), England. 7 passengers were killed and dozens were injured in the deadliest incident on Bournemouth's tram network.

== Events ==
On the west side of The Square, the double track tram lines split at the east end of Poole Hill: the westbound line took the more direct route up the steep Commercial Road; while the eastbound line turned left at the Triangle, and then right into Avenue Road in order to reduce the downhill gradient. At this point in time, the tram lines in and approaching the square were equipped for conduit current collection, not overhead wires.

Bournemouth Corporation Tramways tram car No. 72 was travelling down Avenue Road in the Town Centre towards The Square. Down the hill, the tram gained dangerous speed. The tram failed to navigate a sharp curve and derailed crossing the pavement and falling 20 feet (6.1 m) down an embankment into the garden of a house called Fairlight Glen, adjacent to Bournemouth Gardens. The tram ended up on its side. The driver William Wilton was badly injured but helped to rescue his passengers from the wreckage.

== Aftermath ==
A Board of Trade investigation found that a brake failure was to blame for the crash, as was Bournemouth Corporation Tramways.

The management of the tram system had been split among various departments of Bournemouth Corporation. As a consequence of the accident, management was consolidated under a new tramway general manager, with Charles W. Hill being the first incumbent.

Tram 72, which had been built by Brush Traction in 1906, was recovered and repaired, but re-entered service as 71; the previous 71 being renumbered 82 to facilitate this.

== See also ==
- List of tram accidents
