= Bournemouth War Memorial =

First World War memorial in Bournemouth, United Kingdom

- United Kingdom
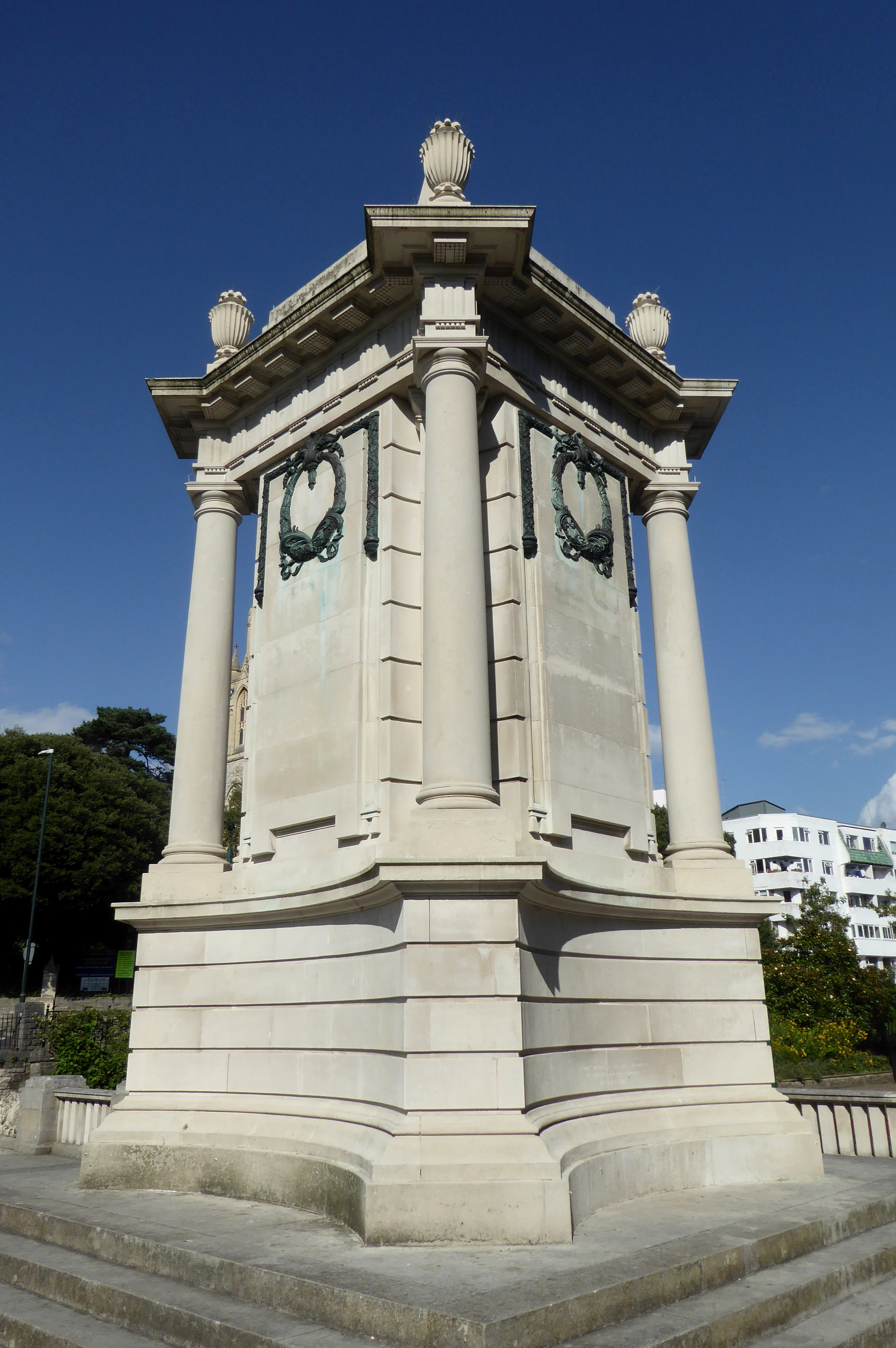
- For servicemen from Bournemouth killed in the First World War
- Unveiled: 1921
- Location: 50°43′17.2″N 1°52′54.9″W; Bournemouth
- Designed by: Albert Edward Shervey

Listed Building – Grade II*
- Official name: Bournemouth War Memorial with associated steps, enclosure and balustrade
- Designated: 12 March 2014
- Reference no.: 1418017

Bournemouth War Memorial is a First World War memorial built in 1921, located in the central gardens in Bournemouth, United Kingdom. The memorial is guarded by two stone lions made by WA Hoare. It was designed by Bournemouth's deputy architect Albert Edward Shervey, who copied the two lions (one sleeping, the other awake and roaring) from Antonio Canova's lions which guarded the tomb of Pope Clement XIII.

The war memorial stands near Bournemouth Town Hall and St. Andrew's Church, Richmond Hill.

== Gallery ==
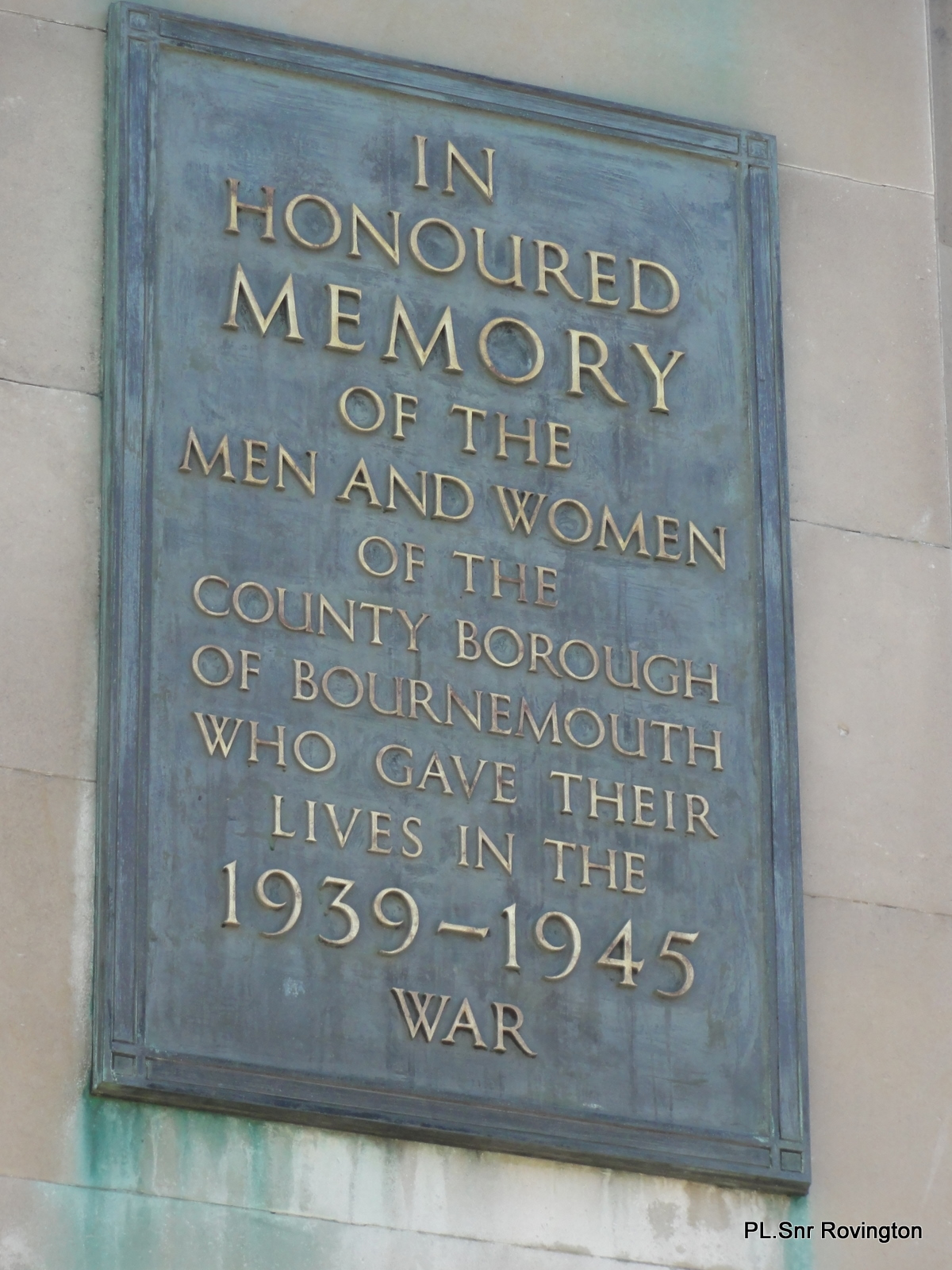
Inscription - World War II

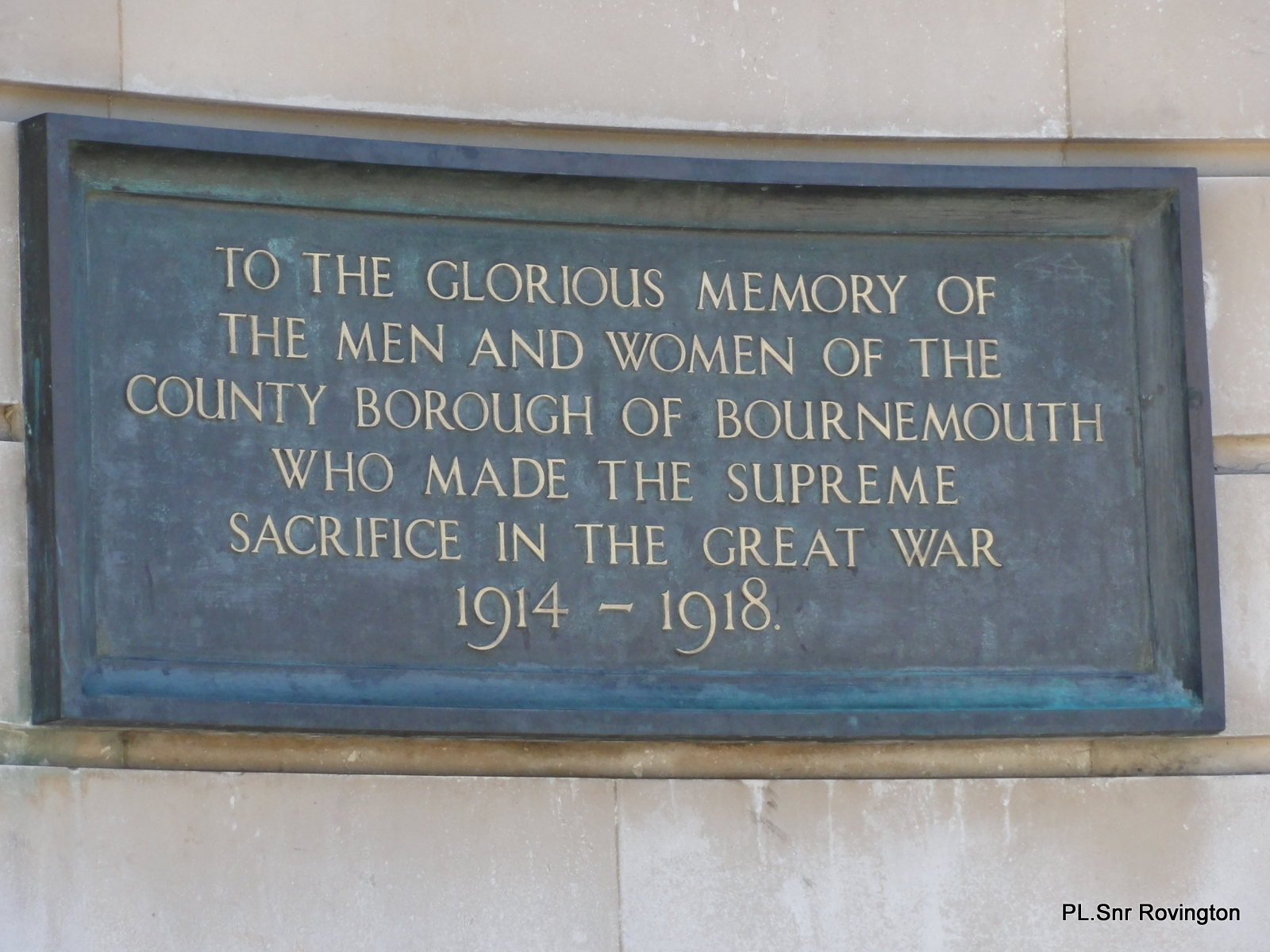
Inscription - World War I

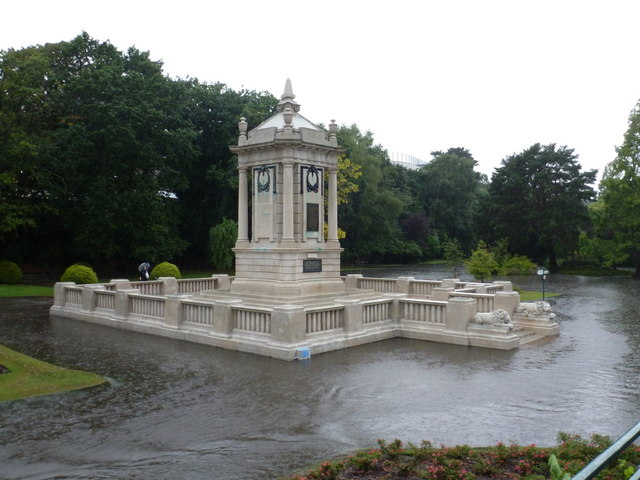
The cenotaph when the River Bourne flooded.

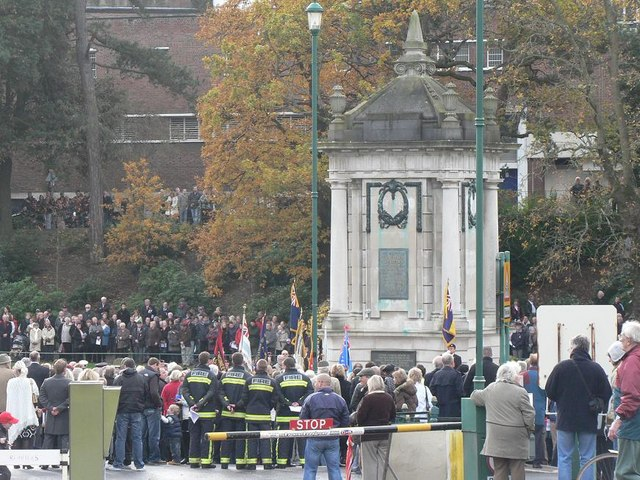
Remembrance Day, 2008.

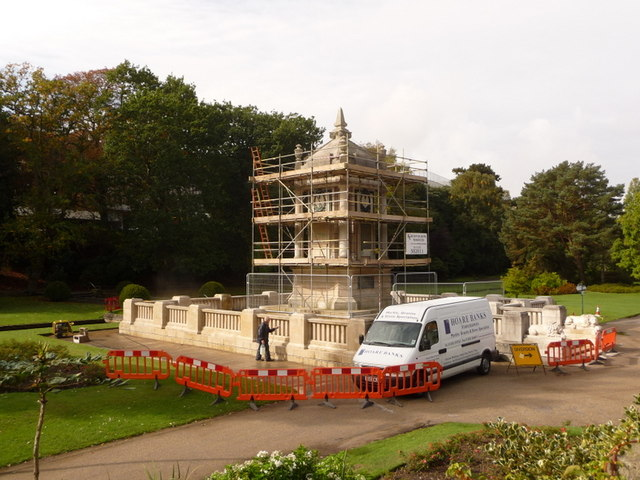
Renovation works, 2010.

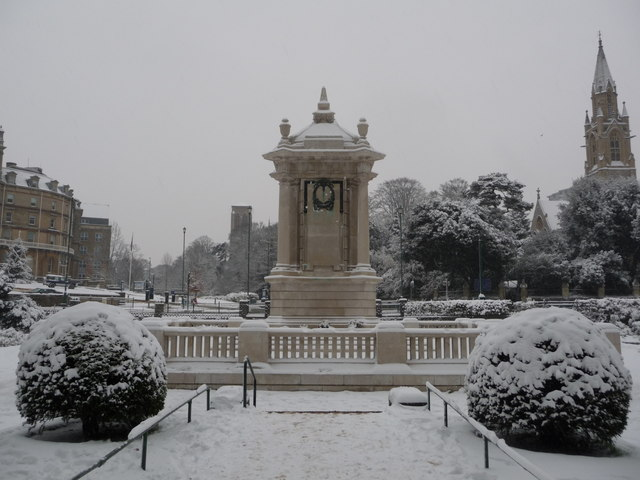
Snowy day, 2010.

== See also ==
- Grade II* listed buildings in Bournemouth
- Grade II* listed war memorials in England
