= Kinson Cemetery =

Historic cemetery in Dorset, England

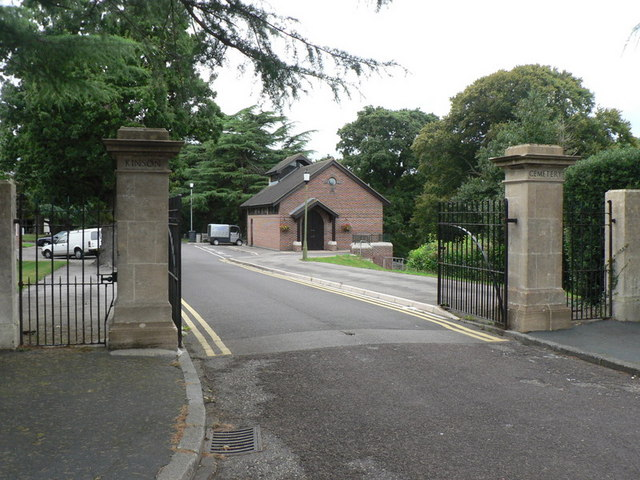
- Kinson Cemetery
- Interactive map of Kinson Cemetery

Details
- Established: 1936
- Location: South Kinson Drive, Bournemouth
- Country: UK
- Coordinates: 50°45′44″N 1°54′16″W
- Type: Cemetery
- Owned by: Bournemouth, Christchurch and Poole Council
- Find a Grave: Kinson Cemetery

Kinson Cemetery is a municipal cemetery in Kinson, a suburb of Bournemouth, England. The cemetery is owned by Bournemouth, Christchurch and Poole Council.

The cemetery has a section maintained by the Commonwealth War Graves Commission containing 4 burials from the Second World War.

== History ==
In 2009, Kinson Cemetery had Bournemouth's first dedicated Muslim burial area.

The Jewish section was actively in use from 1955 to 2005.

== Burials ==
- Peter George Davis (1923–2011), Royal Marines officer
- Sir Roy Welensky (1907–1991), Prime Minister of Rhodesia, 1956–1963

== Gallery ==
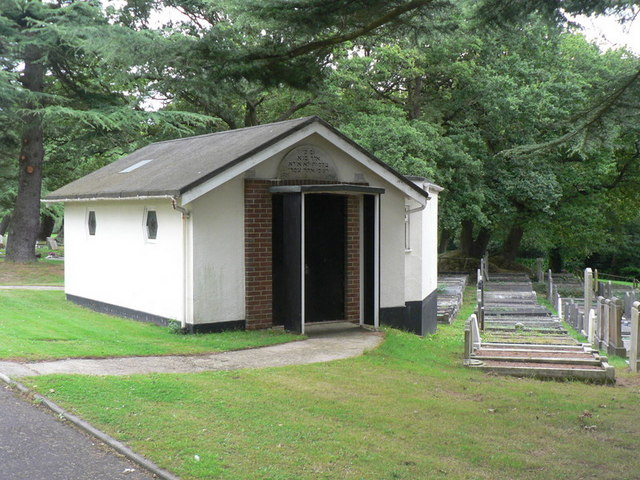
Jewish chapel.

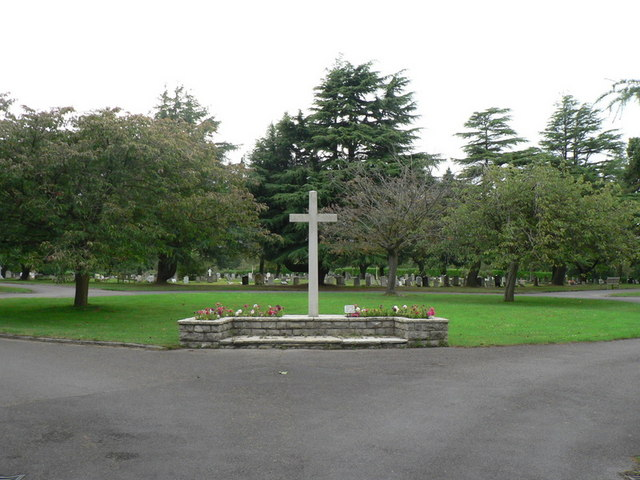
Cross.

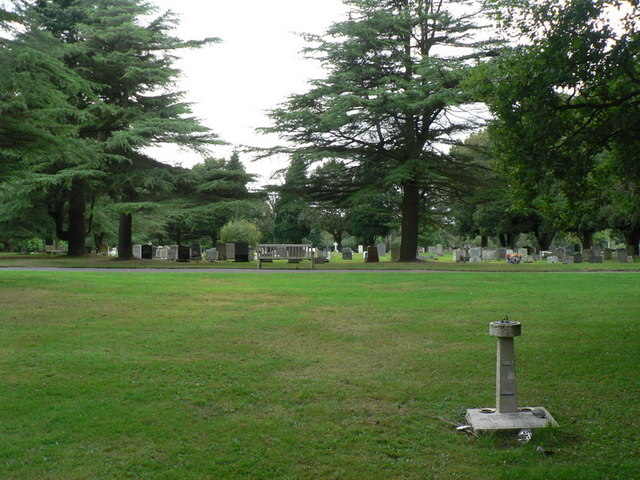
Sundial gravestone.
