= St Andrew's Church, Kinson =

Church in Dorset, England

St Andrew's Church
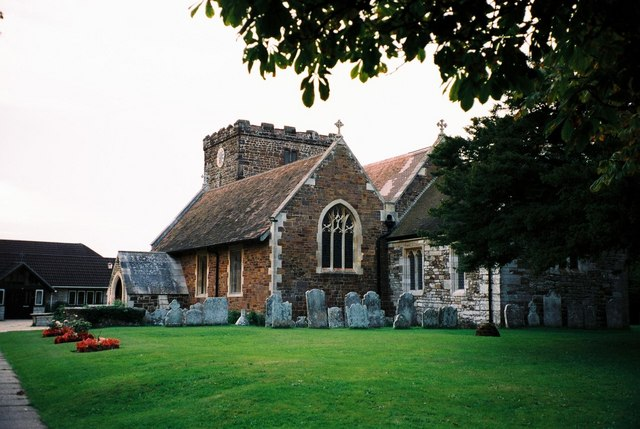
- The church in 1995

Religion
- Affiliation: Anglicanism
- Ecclesiastical or organizational status: active

Location
- Location: Kinson, Bournemouth, Dorset, England
- Interactive map of St Andrew's Church
- Coordinates: 50.77188°N 1.90500°W

Architecture
- Type: Church
- Style: Medieval architecture
- Completed: 13th century

St. Andrew's Church is a Grade II* listed historic parish church in Kinson, Bournemouth, Dorset. The church dates from the 13th century.

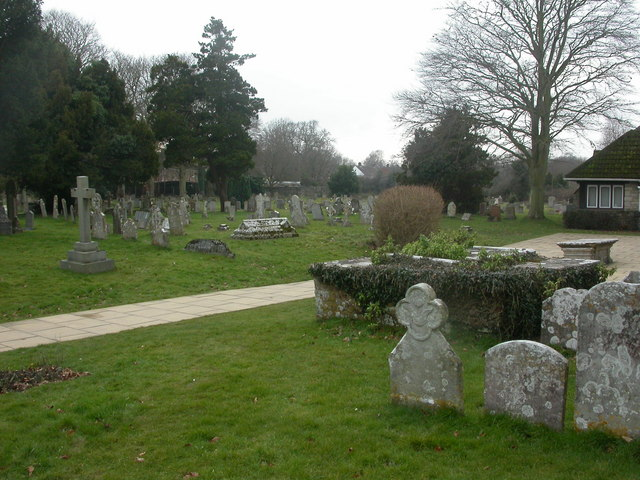
St Andrew's churchyard.

== Overview ==
The church is dedicated to Andrew the Apostle.

== See also ==
- List of churches in Bournemouth
- Grade II* listed buildings in Bournemouth
