= Isaac Gulliver =

English smuggler

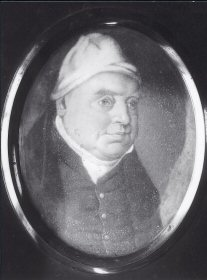
A miniature of Isaac Gulliver painted in 1821 and preserved in Chettle House, Blandford Forum by his descendants

Isaac Gulliver (c. 1745–1822) was an English smuggler based on the South Coast. Gulliver and his gang ran fifteen luggers to transport gin, silk, lace and tea from the Continent to Poole Bay and came to control the coast from Lymington on The Solent in Hampshire, through Dorset to Torbay in Devon. He was known as "King of the Dorset Smugglers" and was also referred to as "the gentle smuggler who never killed a man". His men, who whitened their hair and wore smock-frocks, were known as the "white-wigs".

== Life ==
Gulliver was born at Semington, near Trowbridge in Wiltshire. He owned several farms, including one at Eggardon Hill in Dorset where he planted large clumps of trees to act as navigation aids for his ships. On 5 October 1768 he married innkeeper's daughter Betty Beale at Sixpenny Handley parish church.

An extremely wealthy man, Gulliver was able to build many grand houses, among them 'Howe Lodge', in Kinson, Bournemouth, a purpose-built smuggling stronghold. When the house was demolished in 1958, a number of hiding places were found within, including a secret room only accessible through a door 10 feet up a chimney. It was at Howe Lodge that he allegedly covered his face in white powder and lay in an open coffin. When the customs men arrived to arrest him his wife told them he had died during the night and showed them the 'body'. When they went away, Gulliver got out of the coffin and escaped. Later, a mock funeral was held using a coffin filled with stones.

A 1788 report from the Custom House, Poole, to His Majesty's Commissioners of Customs in London mentioned that:

"Gulliver was considered one of the greatest and most notorious smugglers in the west of England and particularly in the spirits and tea trades but in the year 1782 he took the benefit of his Majesty's proclamation for pardoning such offences and as we are informed dropped that branch of smuggling and afterwards confined himself chiefly to the wine trade which he carried on to a considerable extent having vaults at various places along the coast and "in remote places".

Gulliver became a respected citizen, gentleman and banker. He retired to Gulliver's House, West Borough, Wimborne and died there on 13 September 1822, leaving an estate of £60,000, with properties across Hampshire, Wiltshire, Somerset and Dorset. His body was interred at Wimborne Minster.

== Family ==
Gulliver's only son, Isaac (1774–98) died unmarried, but his daughters married into the Fryer family whose interests and wealth ranged from the Newfoundland fisheries to banking. His descendants include: Sir Frederick Fryer; Lt Gen Sir John Fryer; the banker Edward Castleman, owner of Chettle House; and Captain Thomas Hanham, instrumental in the campaign to legalise cremation in England.

== In literature ==
Willibald Alexis's historical romance Walladmor (1823) includes a smuggler character whom the novel's English translator Thomas De Quincey recognized as based on Isaac Gulliver. De Quincey used the identification to add further material.

Gulliver appears as a character in Leon Garfield's novel The Drummer Boy (1970).

== Legacy ==
In 1993, the Dolphin Inn public house in Kinson was renamed Gulliver’s Tavern.

== See also ==
- Thomas Johnstone
- Jack Rattenbury
