= Thomas Johnstone =

Captain Thomas Johnstone
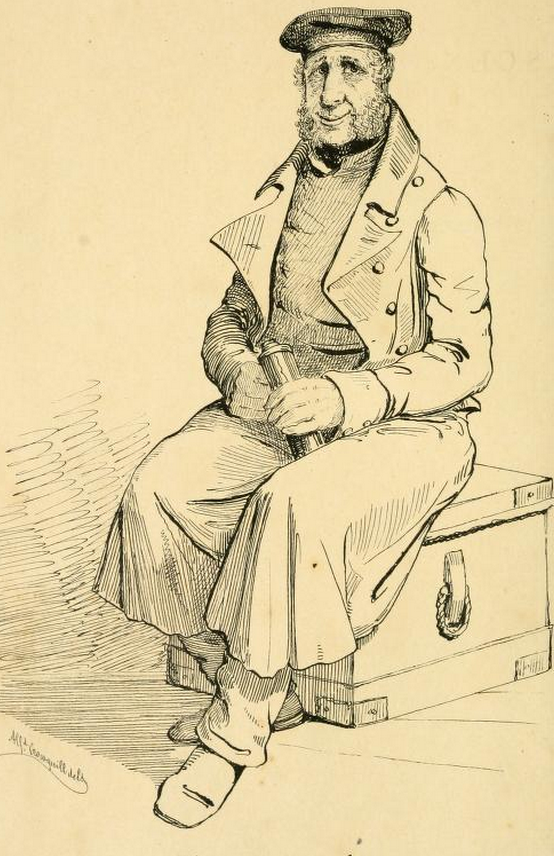
- A sketch of Thomas Johnstone, dated 10 December 1834, taken from the frontispiece of Scenes and Stories by a Clergyman in Debt: Written during his confinement in the debtors' prisons by Frederic William Naylor Bayley.
- Born: Thomas Johnstone; 1772; Lymington, Hampshire, England
- Died: March 1839 (aged 66–67)
- Other name: Thomas Johnson
- Known for: Smuggler; naval warfare

Thomas Johnstone (sometimes called Tom Johnson) (1772–1839) was an English sailor, smuggler and Admiralty saboteur. He was commonly known as Johnstone the Smuggler or the Hampshire Smuggler. Writing in 1823, biographer John Brown described Johnstone as a real-life Rob Roy.

== Biography ==
Johnstone was born near Lymington in 1772. Lymington had a long history of smuggling, beginning with the surreptitious transport of wool to the continent in the 17th century to evade high excise taxes. In 1724 Daniel Defoe wrote of the town: "I do not find they have any foreign commerce, except it be what we call smuggling and roguing; which I may say, is the reigning commerce of all this part of the English coast, from the mouth of the Thames to the Land's End in Cornwall." Johnstone's father was a fisherman and smuggler and began taking his son to sea from the age of 9. By the age of 12, when his father died, Johnstone was an accomplished mariner and his familiarity with the English Channel and the coastal waters from Cornwall to Suffolk made him a much sought-after maritime pilot.

Johnstone began smuggling aged 15, fought against the French in the Napoleonic Wars as a privateer, operated as a British double agent and led teams of divers to plant explosives on enemy shipping and fortifications. He also commanded both HMC Fox (a Revenue Cutter) and the first practical submarine, Nautilus.

In 1798 he was imprisoned at the New Prison in Clerkenwell, London, for smuggling but escaped soon after. Further periods of imprisonment followed in France, Holland, and Fleet debtors' prison. Johnstone managed to escape confinement on each occasion and the 1823 publication The Historical Gallery of Criminal Portraitures, Foreign and Domestic reported: "No prison has yet been found strong enough to hold him."

In 1820, Johnstone was allegedly recruited by French agents to rescue Napoleon Bonaparte from St. Helena. The operation involved using a submarine to pick up Napoleon from near the shore and then transferring him to a waiting sail boat for onward transport to the United States. Napoleon died before the plan was put into effect.

== See also ==
- Isaac Gulliver
