= Peter George Davis =

- Born: 9 December 1923; Paddington, London
- Died: 18 August 2011 (aged 87); Bournemouth
- Burial place: Kinson Cemetery, Bournemouth
- Military career
- Allegiance: United Kingdom
- Branch: Royal Marines
- Service years: 1942–1971
- Rank: Lieutenant Colonel
- Nickname: Pug
- Commands: RM Flotilla 561
- Conflicts: Second World War; Indonesia–Malaysia confrontation
- Awards: Distinguished Service Cross

Lieutenant Colonel Peter George "Pug" Davis DSC (9 December 1923 – 18 August 2011) was an officer in the Royal Marines. He was considered a 'founding father' of the Special Boat Service.

== Early life ==
Davis was born in on 9 December 1923, the son of Solly Davis and Iris Davis (née Pinto). He attended Highgate School and enlisted in the Royal Marines in 1942.

== Career ==
=== Second World War ===
In mid-1944, Davis was based on the island of Vis in the Adriatic off the coast of the Former Yugoslavia (in present-day Croatia) as commander of a flotilla of Landing Craft (Assault) (LCAs). In June some of his reinforcements were ambushed in the mountains during a mission and only twelve men escaped to shore. Davis, who was on an LCA, took the chance to recover their weapons and rescue another officer who had been wounded. He was awarded the Distinguished Service Cross on 13 March 1945 for his actions that day.

=== Later career ===
After the war, Davis was sent to Germany to oversee the establishment of the Royal Marines Demolition Unit along Rhine, intended to be a deterrent against the Soviets in the East. During the 1960s he was a company commander in 40 Commando deployed to the jungles of Borneo for the Indonesia–Malaysia confrontation. He led "Pugforce", an amalgam of Royal Marines, Ghurkhas, Sarawak Rangers and Iban trackers deep in the jungle and managed to capture several rebels.

Later in his career Davis became an amphibious warfare instructor. He retired in 1971.
