= Bournemouth Corporation Tramways =

Tram system in Bournemouth, England, 1902–1936

Coordinates: 51.7203°N 1.8799°W

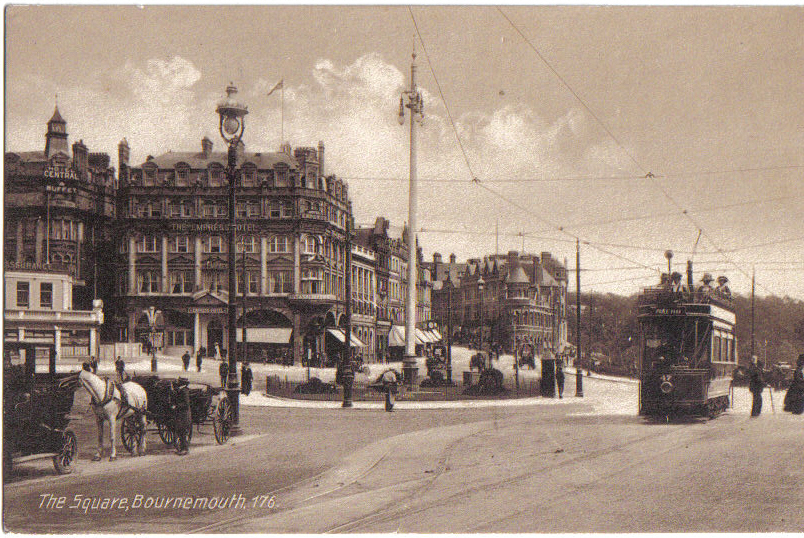
- Tram 47 in The Square, Bournemouth, ca. 1910

Operation
- Locale: Bournemouth
- Open: 23 July 1902
- Close: 8 April 1936
- Status: Closed

Infrastructure
- Track gauge: 3 ft 6 in (1,067 mm)
- Propulsion system: Electric

Statistics
- Route length: 16.11 miles (25.93 km)

Bournemouth Corporation Tramways served the town of Bournemouth in Dorset (although at the time it was in Hampshire) from 23 July 1902 until 8 April 1936.

== History ==
The system was authorised by the Bournemouth Corporation Tramways Order 1900. In June 1905 the company took a lease on the Poole and District Electric Tramways and a connection was made to this system for through running.

On 1 May 1908, a tram derailed in Bournemouth Town Centre, killing 7 and injuring 26.

Until May 1911, part of the system was equipped with conduit current collection to avoid unsightly overhead wiring on the central section of the tramway. From May 1911, overhead wiring was introduced.

== Infrastructure ==
The system extended to the suburb of Winton to the north and to the adjacent towns of Poole to the west and Christchurch to the east.

Routes were centred on The Square at SZ 0857 9119. The major lines were:

- heading east along Old Christchurch Road, Christchurch Road, Seabourne Road, Belle Vue Road, Foxholes Road, Belle Vue Road, Stour Road, Bargates then High Street (Christchurch) to a terminus at Christchurch Castle at SZ 1591 9267.
- heading west along Commercial Road, Poole Road, Ashley Road, North Road, Parkstone Road then Longfleet Road to a terminus at Poole railway station at SZ 0132 9105.
- heading north along Richmond Hill then Wimborne Road to a terminus at its junction with Redhill Crescent at SZ 0899 9513.

There were four depots:

- depot with workshops and generating station off Southcote Road at SZ 1041 9198.
- depot off Christchurch Road near Pokesdown railway station at SZ 1242 9234.
- depot off Ashley Road, Poole at SZ 0435 9208.
- depot off Wimborne Rd, Moordown at SZ 0898 9507.

== Tramcars ==
The fleet, in a livery of maroon and yellow, consisted of:

- 151 double deck tramcars.
- 1 single deck tramcar.

== Closure ==
The tramway system began its closure in 1929 when motorbuses of Hants and Dorset Motor Services were introduced as a tram replacement on the Lower Parkstone route. In 1933 Bournemouth Corporation began to open trolleybus routes, and in 1936 the remaining tram routes were converted to operation by the trolleybuses of Bournemouth Corporation.

== Preserved tramcars ==
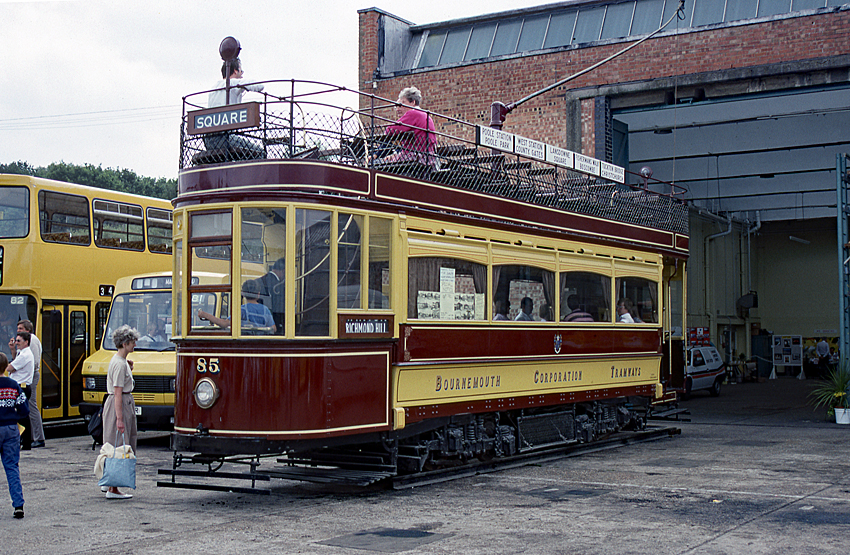
No 85 at Mallard Road depot in 1989

Bournemouth tram number 85 is now preserved and on static display at the National Tramway Museum, before its transfer it was displayed at the Museum of Electricity in Christchurch.

The body of car 106 was discovered on a Dorset farm, and eventually presented to Seaton Tramway in 1974. Due to the narrow gauge at Seaton of 2 ft 9 in (840 mm), the body was narrowed and rebuilt as an enclosed single deck saloon. It was launched into service in 1992, bearing the fleet number 16 and a livery closely resembling that of the Bournemouth system.

The body of car 13 is under restoration at the former Coalport railway station in Shropshire.

== See also ==
- List of town tramway systems in the United Kingdom
