= St Ambrose Church, Westbourne =

Coordinates: 50°43′03″N 1°54′01″W

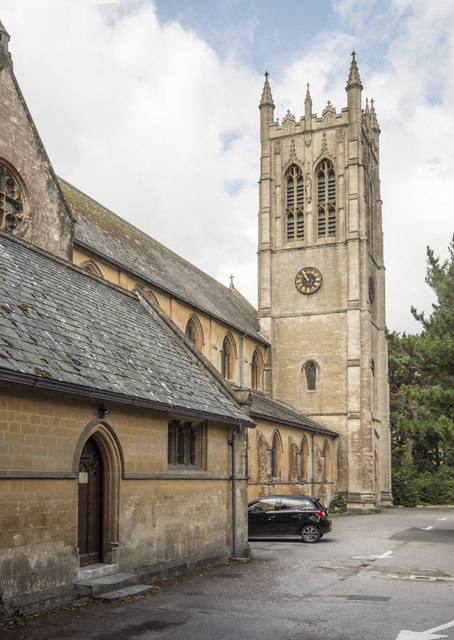
- A view of the church's north and spire
- St Ambrose Church, Westbourne
- Denomination: Church of England
- Churchmanship: Anglo-Catholic
- Website: Official website

History
- Dedication: Saint Ambrose

Architecture
- Architect: Charles Hodgson Fowler
- Style: Gothic Revival

Administration
- Province: Canterbury
- Diocese: Winchester
- Parish: St Ambrose

Clergy
- Vicar: The Rev Adrian Pearce

St Ambrose Church is a Church of England parish church in Westbourne, Bournemouth, England. It is rooted in the Anglo-Catholic tradition, and is a member of Forward in Faith and The Society. It is under the alternative episcopal oversight of the Bishop of Richborough.

== History ==
The church was designed by Charles Hodgson Fowler and features a carved and painted reredos and an intricate font cover by Temple Moore. The foundation stone was laid on 20 October 1898, and construction was completed (and the church dedicated) by 10 October 1900. The church was consecrated by Herbert Edward Ryle, Bishop of Winchester, on 14 May 1907.

The church is built out of Bath stone and incorporates fine stained glass windows (the work of Burlison & Grylls and James Powell & Sons). The church also features an Italian marble pulpit, a detailed alabaster Lady Chapel reredos, and an elaborate wrought-iron rood screen. It is a Grade II* listed building.

In 2006 the church suffered a fire in the north aisle, supposedly due to arson. Restoration efforts came to a sum of over £500,000.

== See also ==
- List of churches in Bournemouth
- Grade II* listed buildings in Bournemouth
