= Gulliver's Tavern =

Pub in Bournemouth, Dorset, England

Coordinates: 50°46′08″N 1°54′09″W

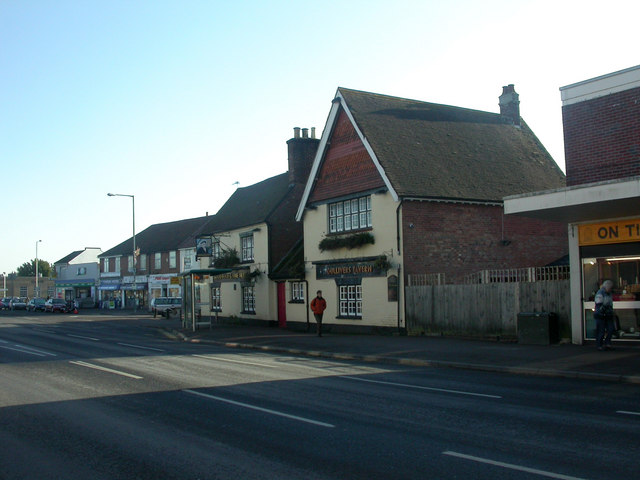
Gulliver's Tavern in 2009

Gulliver’s Tavern, formerly known as the Dolphin Inn and now known as The Acorn, is a historic pub in the Kinson area of Bournemouth, Dorset, England. Dating from the 18th century, is believed to be the oldest pub in the town.

== History ==
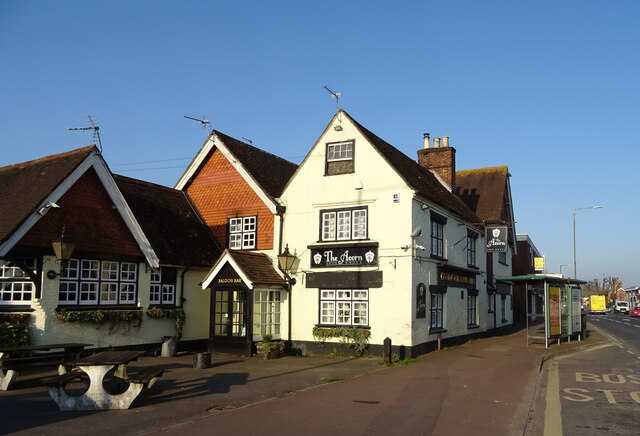
The Acorn public house in 2022

The pub was built in 1750 as a public house and stables known as the Dolphin and Chequer. The tavern stands on Wimborne Road, which historically linked the towns of Wimborne Minster and Christchurch together.

In 1988, it became a Grade II listed building by Historic England. In 1993 the pub was renamed the Gulliver’s Tavern after the local smuggler Sir Isaac Gulliver (1745-1822). His ghost has been said to haunt the pub. In 2018, the pub became under new ownership and was reopened as The Acorn.
