= Bournemouth Town Hall =

Municipal building in Bournemouth, Dorset, England

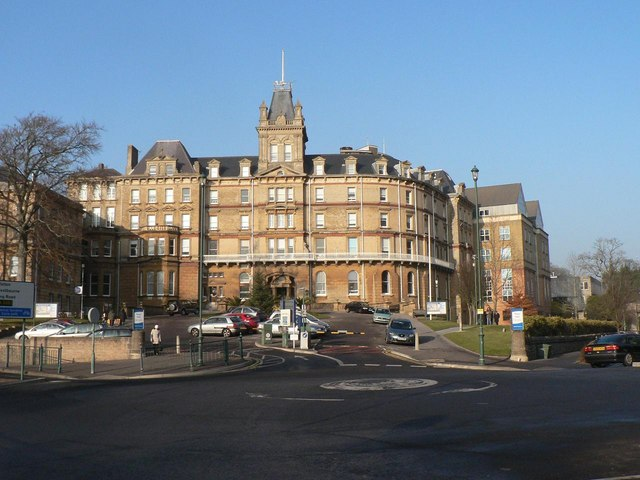
- Bournemouth Town Hall

- Shown in Dorset
- 50.7226°N 1.8820°W
- Location: Bournemouth

History
- Built: 1885

Site notes
- Architect: Alfred Bedborough
- Architectural styles: French, Italianate and Neoclassical styles

Listed Building – Grade II
- Official name: The Town Hall
- Designated: 11 December 2001
- Reference no.: 1389612

Bournemouth Town Hall, also known as the Civic Centre and formerly the Mont Dore Hotel, is a municipal facility in Bourne Avenue, Bournemouth, England. The town hall, which is the meeting place of Bournemouth, Christchurch and Poole Council, is a Grade II listed building. The town hall stands opposite Bournemouth Gardens and the Bournemouth War Memorial and is adjacent to St. Andrew's Church, Richmond Hill.

== History ==
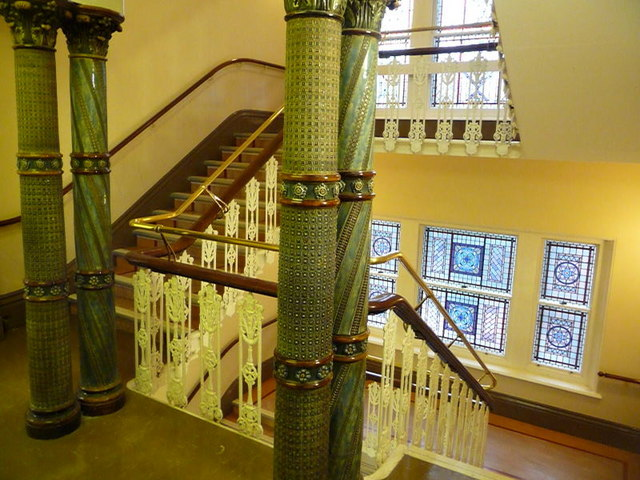
A view of the ornate staircase within the town hall

The site had once formed part of a large wooded area known as "Bruce's Wood" named after the early 19th century owner of the land, Patrick Craufurd Bruce MP, who also planted vast forests in Berkshire, Gloucestershire, Oxfordshire and Hampshire. It was acquired by a solicitor, George Durrant, who renamed it the Branksome Estate, in the 1850s. Durrant started selling parts of the estate and the site was initially used for a boarding use known as The Glen. The site was then acquired by Dr Alfred Meadow who had ambitions to establish a spa hotel offering treatment for tuberculosis, bronchitis, asthma and nervous and rheumatic paralysis on a similar basis to the treatment used at the thermal spring at Mont-Dore in France.

The foundation stone for the new building was laid by King Oscar II of Sweden and Norway, whose consort Queen Sophia had developed an interest in the treatment, on 26 May 1881. It was designed by Alfred Bedborough in the French, Italianate and Neoclassical styles and opened as the Mont Dore Hotel in 1885. The design involved a long, curved main frontage of 25 bays facing the corner of Bourne Avenue and Braidley Road; the entrance section, which slightly projected forward, featured a portico with a broken segmental pediment containing an oculus; there was a balcony with a triple sash window on the first floor, triple sash windows on the second and third floors and a pediment above; there was a belvedere with turrets and a pavilion roof above that.

The building became a hospital for British Indian Army soldiers during the First World War. The efforts of the hospital to raise money for the construction of the Admiralty M-class destroyer HMS Phoebe in 1916 was subsequently commemorated by the HMS Phoebe Room in the building and its contribution to the Anglo-Russian Hospital in Petrograd was subsequently commemorated by the presentation of a flag from the Russian Empire on 31 July 1917.

The building became a convalescent home for officers later in 1917 and was then acquired by Bournemouth Borough Council in 1919 and, after it had been converted into a town hall, it was re-opened by the mayor, Councillor Charles Henry Cartwright, in 1921. An additional wing containing a dedicated council chamber, which projected forward and featured a bowed front, was built to the left of the main building in 1930. Queen Elizabeth II, accompanied by the Duke of Edinburgh, visited the town hall in July 1966. In the 1980s a bunker was constructed under the building to protect civic leaders in the event of a nuclear attack.

The town hall continued to serve as the headquarters of Bournemouth Borough Council and then continued to operate as the local seat of government after the formation of the new unitary authority, Bournemouth, Christchurch and Poole Council, on 1 April 2019. The new council renamed the building the "BCP Council Civic Centre".

Works of art in the town hall include a portrait of Captain Lewis Tregonwell of the Dorset Yeomanry by Thomas Beach and a portrait of the former mayor, Sir Merton Russell-Cotes, and his wife, Lady Annie Russell-Cotes, by Frank Richards.
