= The Square, Bournemouth =

Public square

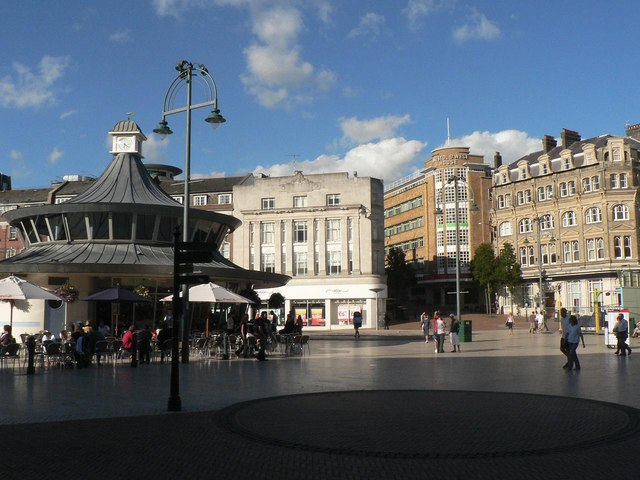
- The Square, Bournemouth
- Interactive map of The Square, Bournemouth
- Owner: Bournemouth, Christchurch and Poole Council
- Location: Bournemouth
- Postal code: BH2 6EG
- Coordinates: 50.72032°N 1.87981°W

The Square is a public square in Bournemouth Town Centre that marks the centre of Bournemouth, England. The Square separates the Central Gardens from the Lower Gardens.

== History ==
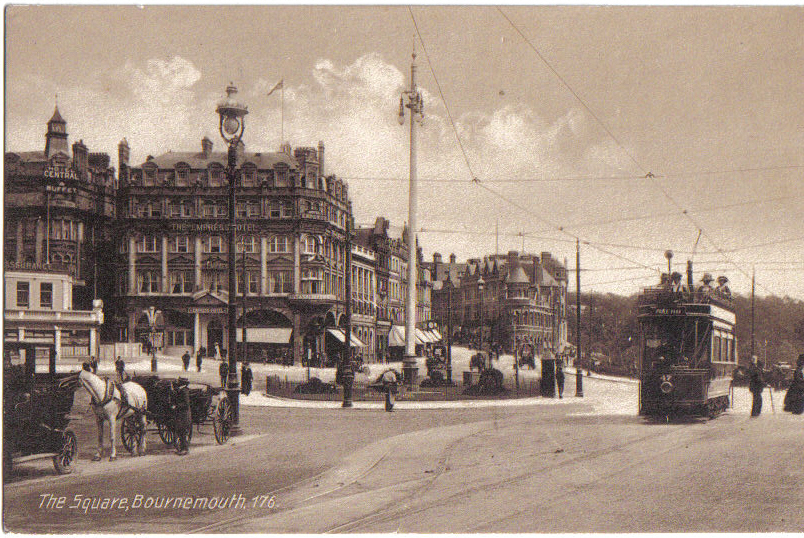
Bournemouth Corporation Tramways tram no 47 in The Square ca. 1910

In the 18th century Decoy Pond House stood at the point where a plank was used to cross the Bourne Stream on the track from Poole to Christchurch. The River Bourne still flows under the Square.

In 1848 composer Hubert Parry was born next door to The Square and is marked with a blue plaque.

In 1925, a tram shelter was built at the center of the Square, with a clock on the top, which was given by Captain HB Norton, a magistrate and former Councillor.

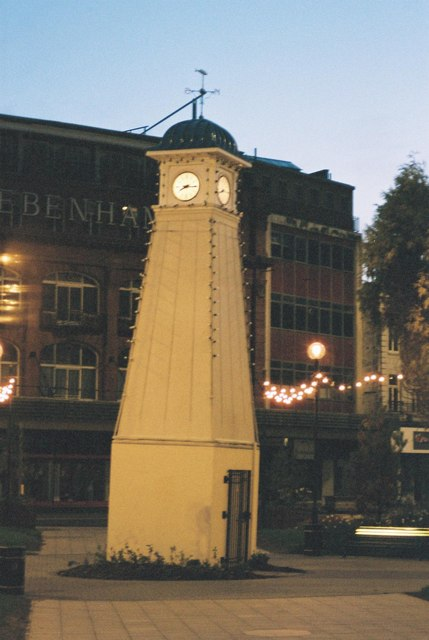
The "leaning tower of Bournemouth" in 1995

The Square later became a large roundabout, with the clock being relocated into a clock tower at the roundabout's centre. By this time the clock tower had become known as the "Leaning Tower of Bournemouth".

The roundabout was removed in October 1992, and since 2000 the square has been almost totally pedestrianised. The old clocktower is now the site of the Obscura Café, so called because it once incorporated a functioning camera obscura, and the clock was installed at the top of the cafe.

== Stores ==
- Debenhams - Formerly Bobby & Co.
- Sports Direct-(Formerly JJB Sports)
- M&S
- Primark-(Formerly BHS)
- Beales
- House of Fraser-(Formerly Dingles)
- WHSmith
- Waterstones
- TK Maxx
- Wilko
- River Island
- H&M
