= Bournemouth Gardens, England =

Garden in Dorset, England

Bournemouth Gardens
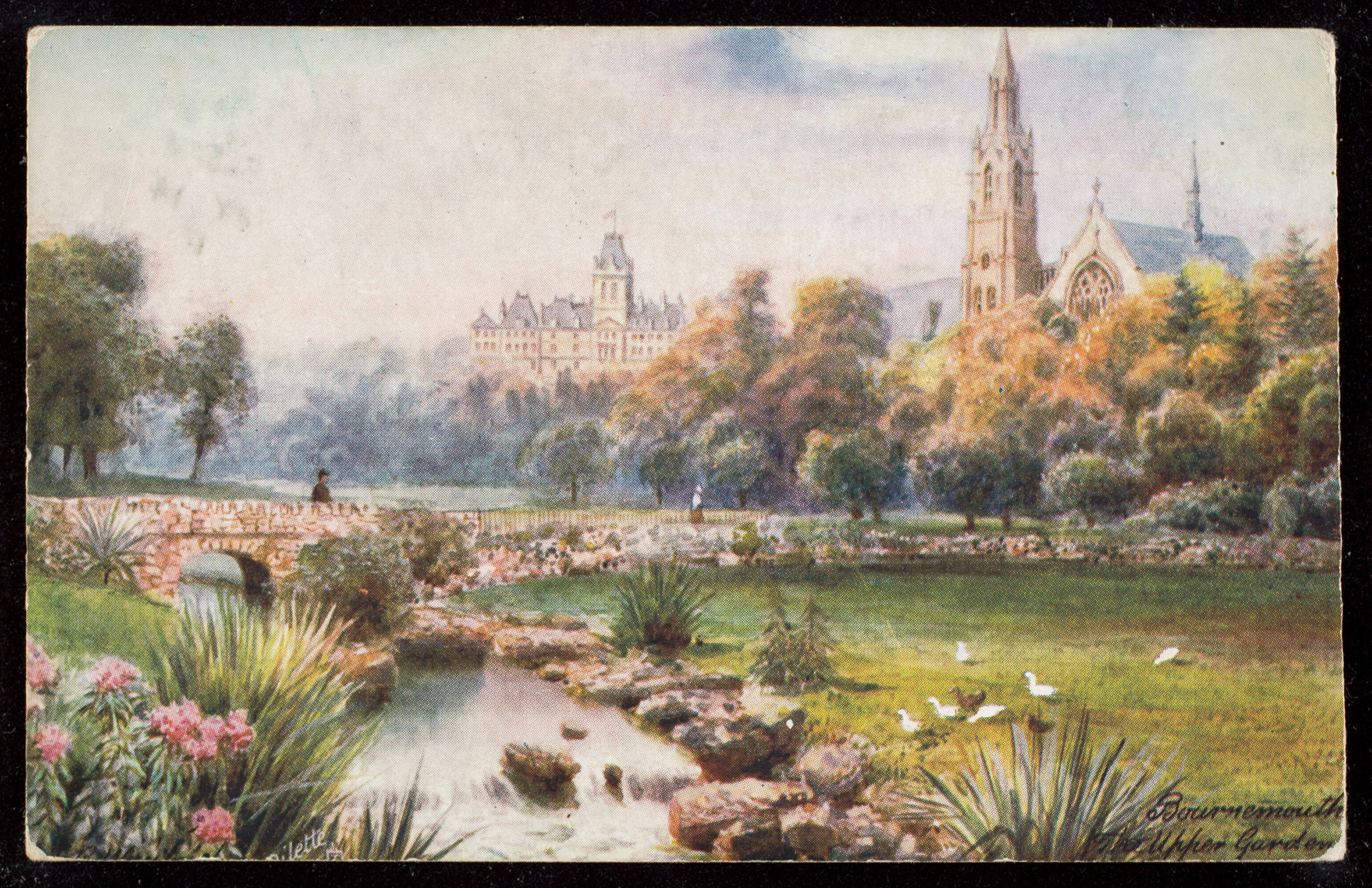
- A postcard from the 1910s showing the Upper Gardens. The building in the background is the Mont Dore Hotel, now Bournemouth Town Hall. The tower to the right is St. Andrew's Church.

- Location within Dorset
- Interactive map of Bournemouth Gardens
- Type: Landscaped garden
- Location: Bournemouth, Dorset, England
- Coordinates: 50°43′2.53″N 01°52′33″W
- Area: 3 kilometres (20.5 hectares)
- Opened: 1840
- Website: www.bcpcouncil.gov.uk/Leisure-culture-and-local-heritage/Parks-and-open-spaces/Parks/Parks-in-Bournemouth/Bournemouth-Gardens.aspx

Bournemouth Gardens are Grade II listed gardens in the town of Bournemouth, Dorset, England. Created in the nineteenth century, the gardens follow the town's eponymous River Bourne three kilometres from the historic boundary with Poole south-eastwards into Bournemouth Town Centre.

The Gardens are home to a number of significant Bournemouth landmarks and listed buildings such as; the Town Hall, the War Memorial, St. Andrew's Church and the Pavilion Theatre.

Bournemouth Gardens have been Green Flag Award winners since 1999.

== History ==
The gardens were planted between 1836 and 1840, with designs made by architects Benjamin Ferrey and Decimus Burton. It wasn't until 1859 that the gardens became publicly accessible.

On 1 May 1908, 7 people were killed and 26 were injured when a tram crashed into the gardens. In 1924-29 the Pavilion Theatre was built in the Lower Central Gardens. In 1970 the Wessex Way flyover (A338) was constructed, cutting through the Upper Central Gardens Collectively known as Upper, Central and Lower Pleasure Gardens, and Coy Pond Gardens, Bournemouth Gardens has constituted as a listed building since 1986 by Historic England.

The COVID-19 pandemic in 2020 reportedly hit the finances of the Gardens Trust.

== Coy Pond Gardens ==
The gardens begin at Coy Pond. The gardens are bordered by Bourne Valley and Talbot Woods to the north and Branksome Woods and Westbourne to the south.

== Upper Gardens ==
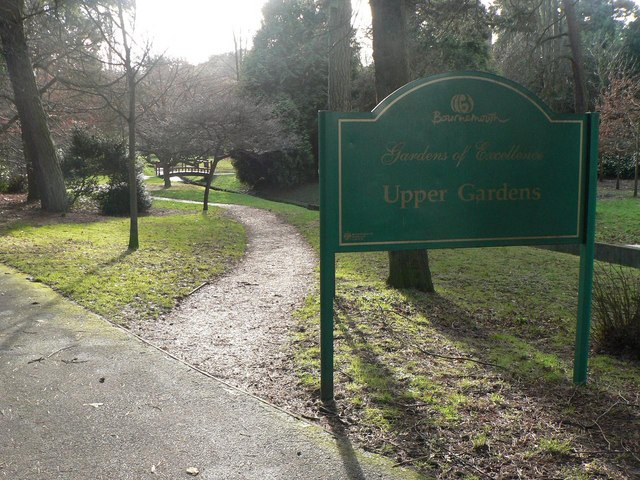
Welcome Sign at the entrance to Upper Gardens.

The Upper Gardens has three distinct continental gardens, European, Asian and North American. The Upper Gardens hold many unusual tree species including a North American Giant Redwood (believed to be the largest in Britain).

The water tower was built between 1883 and 1903, and is currently disused.

== Central Gardens ==
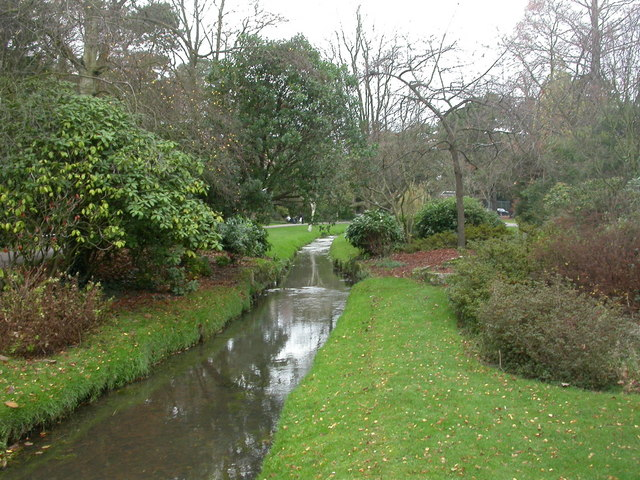
Bournemouth Central Gardens along the Bourne Stream.

The Square separates Central Gardens from the Lower Gardens. Bournemouth War Memorial was built in 1922.

== Lower Gardens ==
The historic band stand is in the Lower Gardens. The rock garden was built in the 1930s.

== Events ==
The Gardens have an annual Winter Wonderland attraction at Christmas.

== Amenities ==
Bournemouth Gardens has a Tennis Centre. The Bournemouth Eye hot air balloon was an attraction until 2016.

== Gallery ==
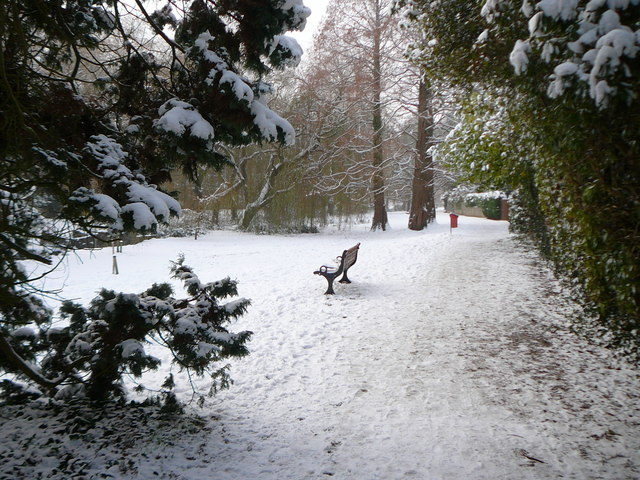
Coy Pond Gardens in the snow.

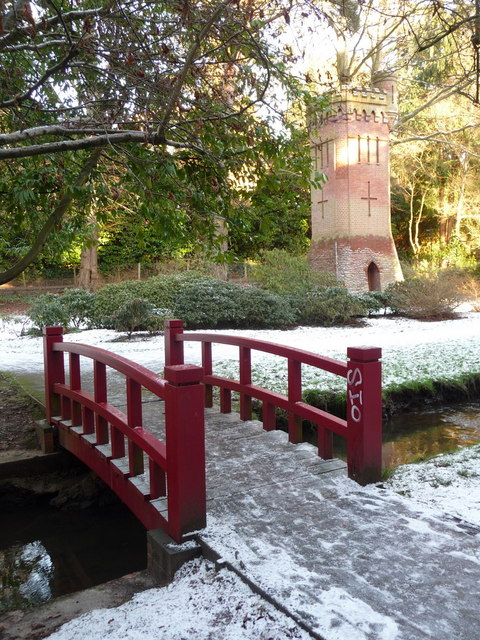
Asian style bridge with the water tower in the background.

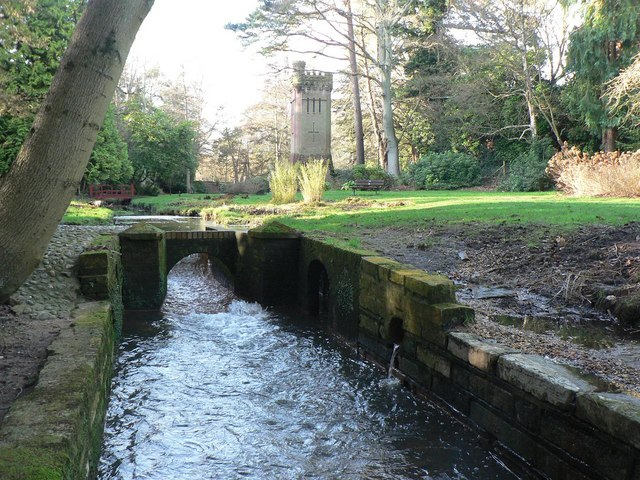
River Bourne near the water tower.

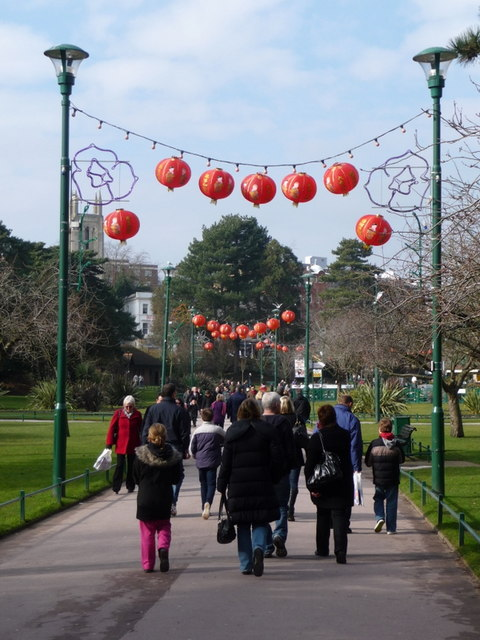
Chinese New Year in Bournemouth Gardens, 2010.

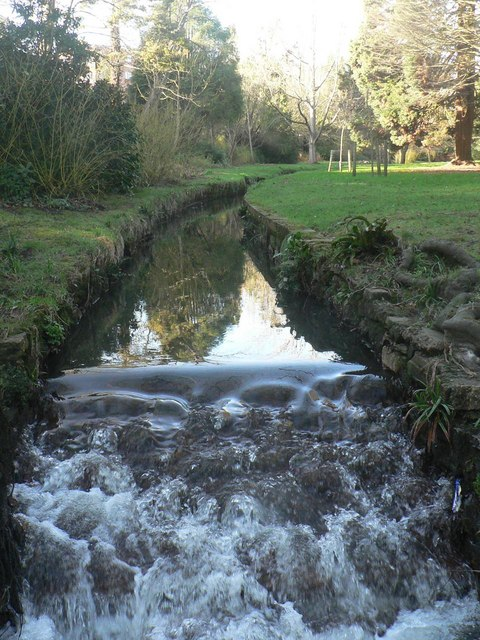
Waterfall.

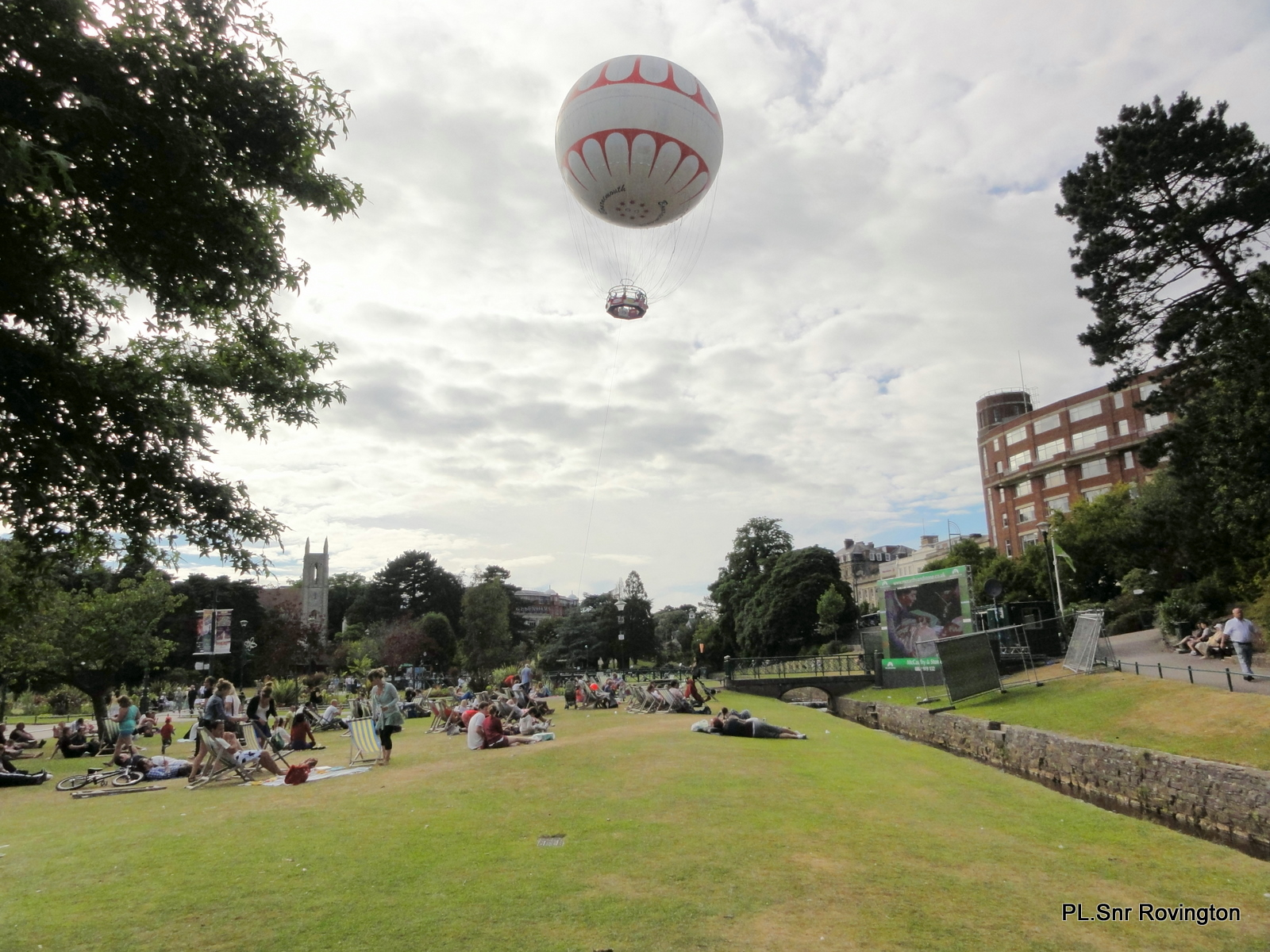
The Bournemouth Eye in the gardens, 2010.

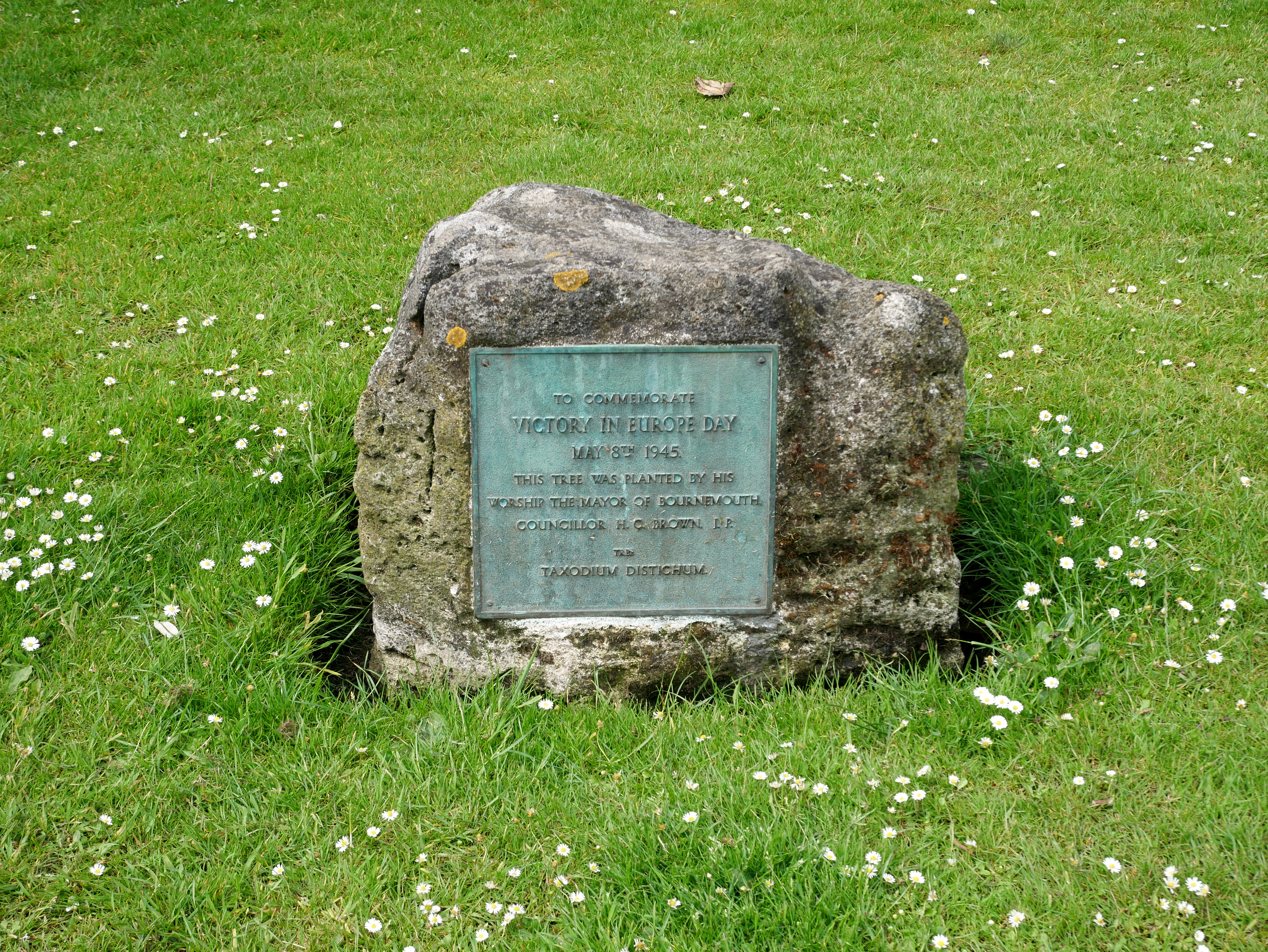
Memorial Stone in Bournemouth Gardens, recognising Victory in Europe Day.

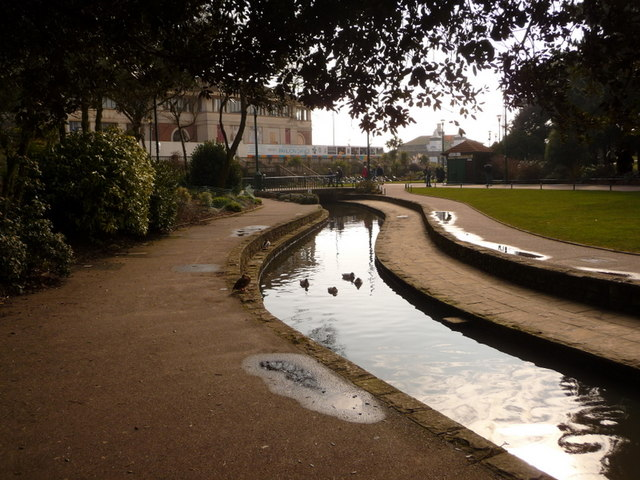
The Bourne Stream meanders towards the Pavilion theatre.
