= St John the Evangelist's Church, Bournemouth =

Church in Bournemouth, Dorset, England

St John the Evangelist's Church
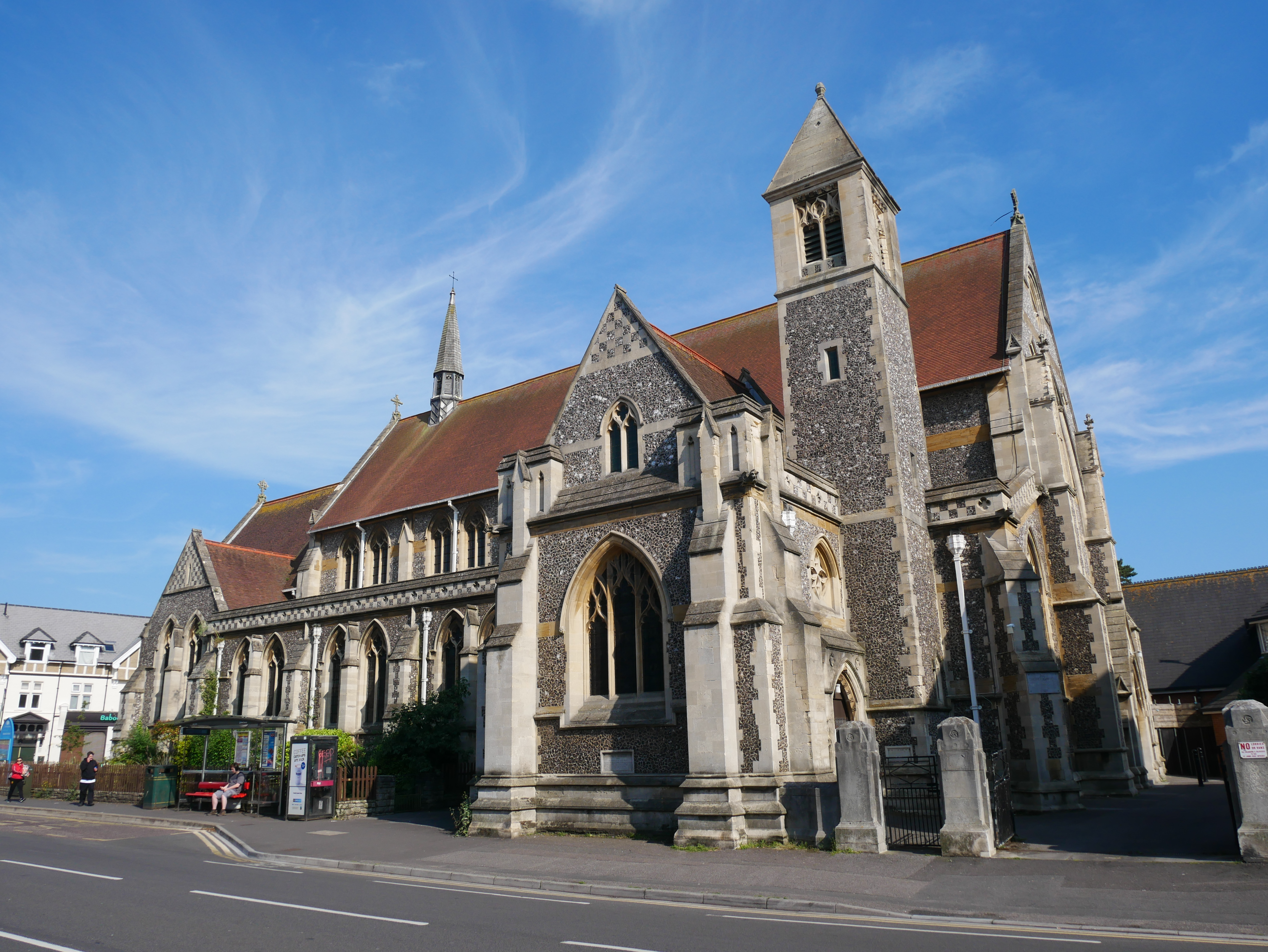
- St John the Evangelist's Church in 2021

Religion
- Affiliation: Anglicanism
- Ecclesiastical or organisational status: active

Location
- Location: Boscombe, Bournemouth, Dorset, England
- Interactive map of St John the Evangelist's Church
- Coordinates: 50.7249°N 1.84475°W

Architecture
- Architect: John Oldrid Scott
- Type: Church
- Style: English Gothic architecture
- Completed: 1893-1895

Website
- www.stjohnsboscombe.uk

St John the Evangelist's Church is a historic building and church in the Boscombe area of Bournemouth, Dorset, England.

== History ==
The church was constructed in the 1890s by John Oldrid Scott and C.T. Miles. The church is constructed from flint and stone. AFC Bournemouth is descended from the Boscombe St John's Lads Institute football team. The church conatimns a stained glass window from 1934 by Caroline Townshend. Historic England classified it as a Grade II* listed building on 27 February 1976.

== See also ==
- List of churches in Bournemouth
- List of Anglican churches
