= St. Andrew's Church, Richmond Hill =

Grade II listed Gothic Victorian church in Richmond Hill, Bournemouth, Dorset, England

Coordinates: 50°43′19″N 1°52′50″W

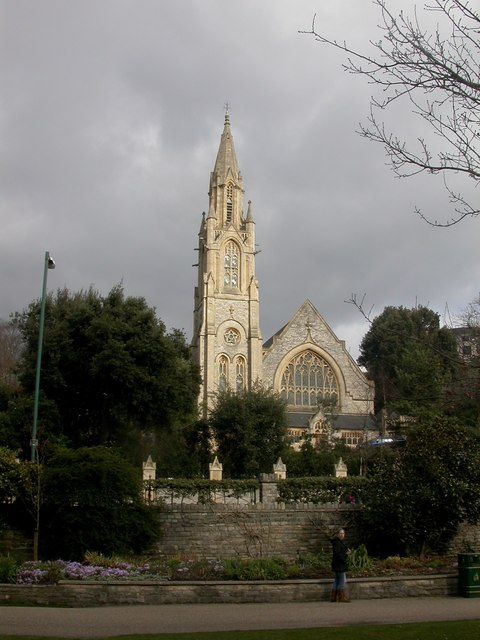
St Andrew's United Reformed Church, Richmond Hill, Bournemouth, seen from the southwest.

St. Andrew's Church is a Grade II listed Gothic Victorian church in Richmond Hill, Bournemouth, Dorset, England. A United Reformed church, it is noted for being the largest church in the town.

The church stands behind the Norfolk Royale Hotel, next to Bournemouth Town Hall and opposite the Bournemouth War Memorial.

== History ==
The original church was built in 1856, but the current building was built in 1891 and has since been the largest church in Bournemouth.

== Gallery ==
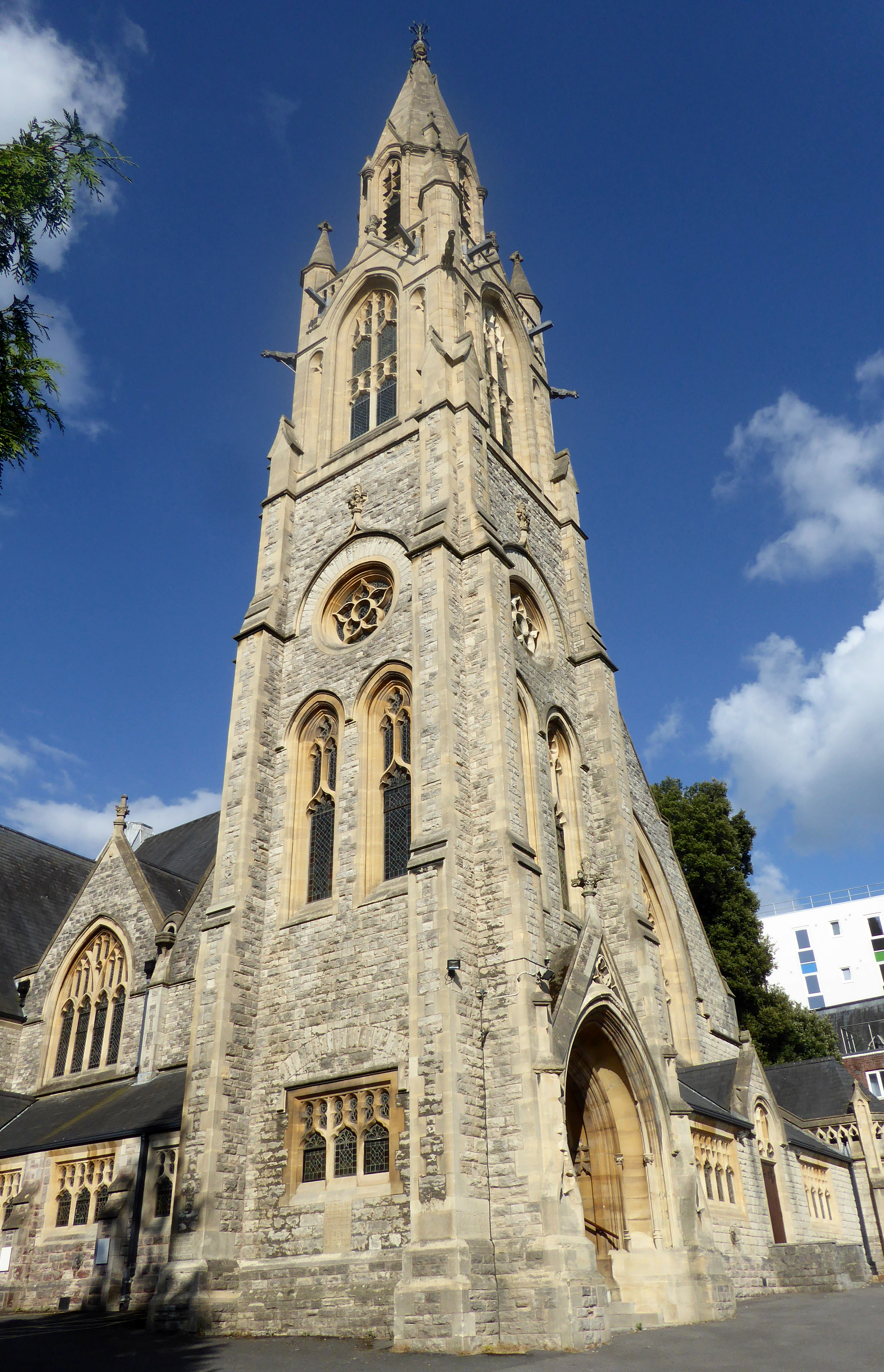
Tower of St Andrew's Church

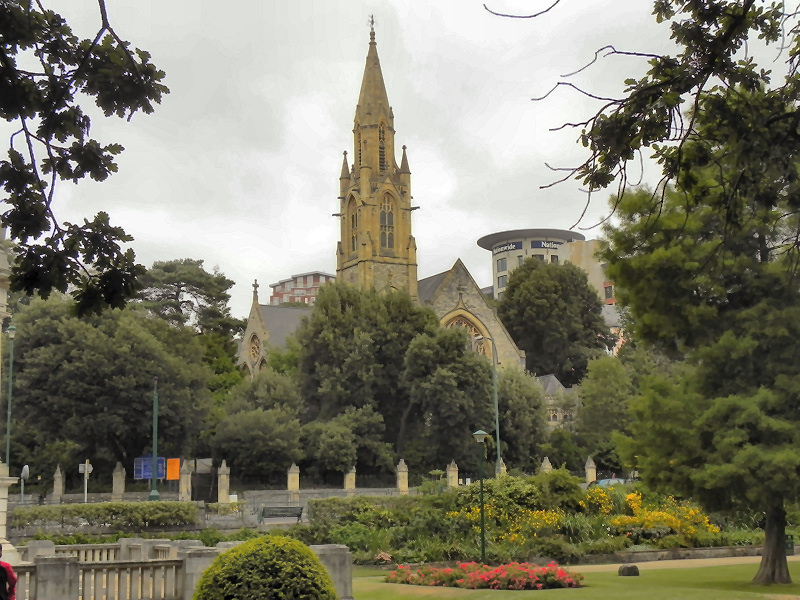
The church from across Bournemouth Gardens

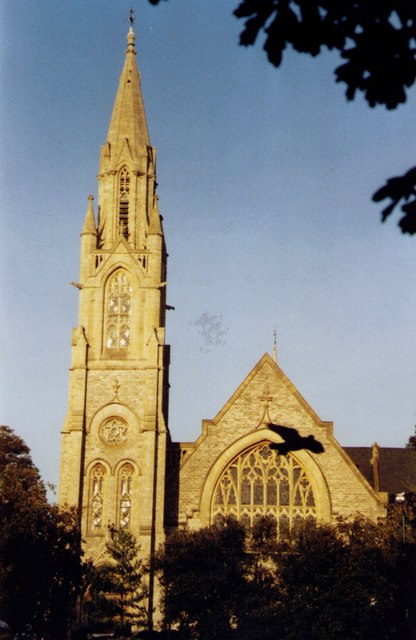
The church in 2002

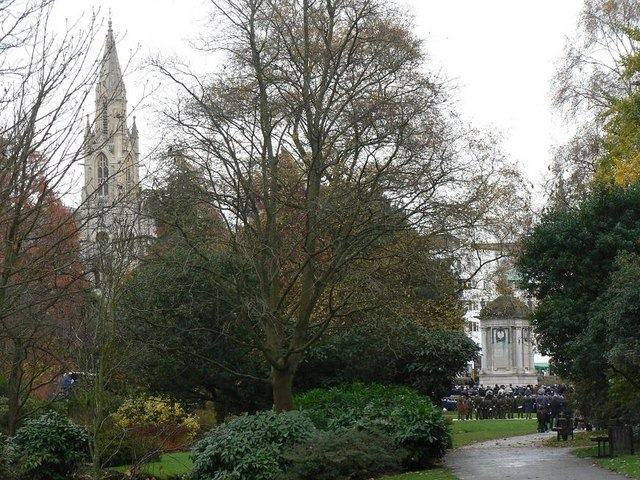
The church alongside Bournemouth War Memorial

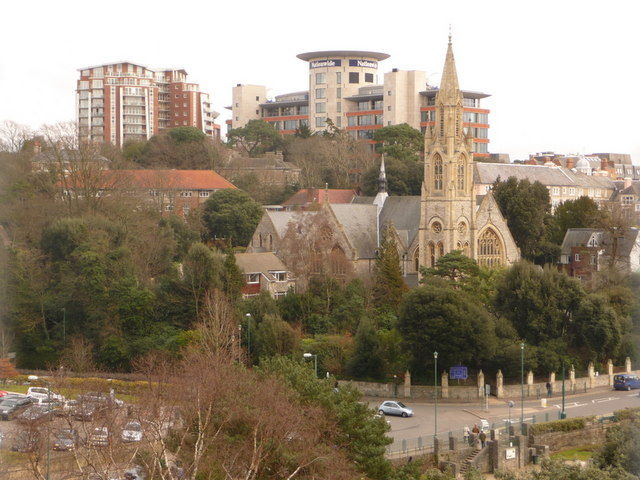
Elevated view of the church

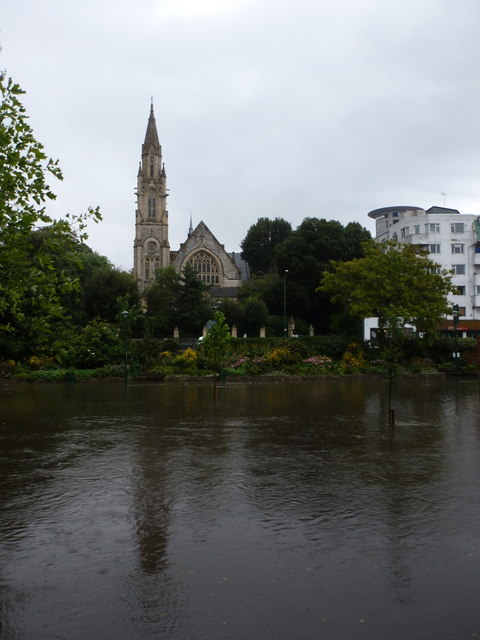
St. Andrew’s Church across from a flooded River Bourne in 2011.

== See also ==
- List of churches in Bournemouth
