= River Bourne, Dorset =

River in Dorset, England

River Bourne
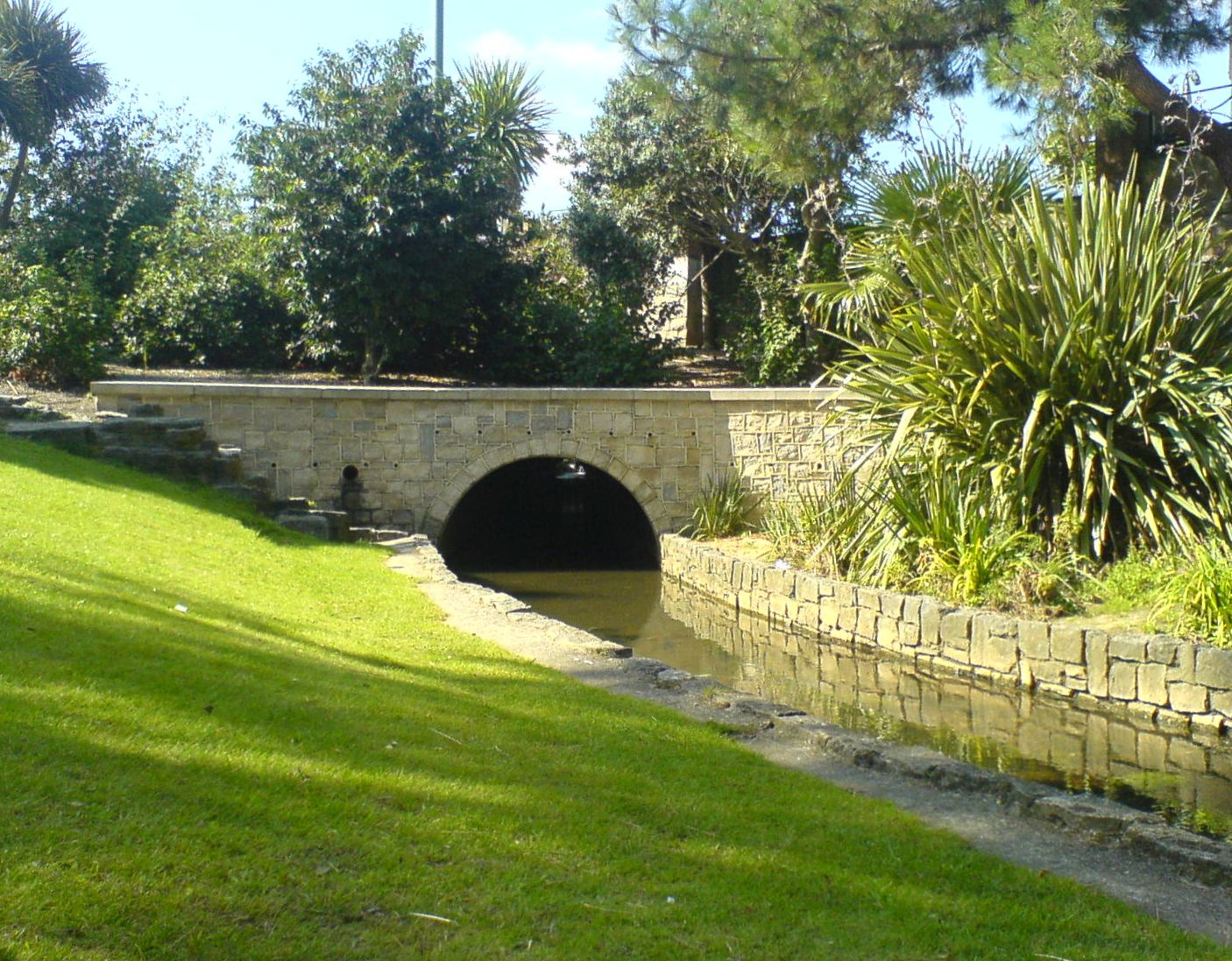
- The River Bourne as it flows through Bournemouth Gardens

- Location within Dorset

Location
- Country: United Kingdom
- County: Dorset

Physical characteristics
- Source
  - location: Canford Heath
  - elevation: 60m Approx.
- Length: 7 km (4.3 mi)
- Basin size: 13.816 km²

Basin features
- Tributaries
  - right: Kinson Brook

The River Bourne is a 7-kilometre (4.3 mi) long river that flows through Poole and Bournemouth in Dorset. It originally reached the sea at Bournemouth Beach, giving the town its name, but now, in normal circumstances, it flows directly into the combined sewer overflow beneath the approach to Bournemouth Pier and into the sea through a submerged outfall 630 metres off the coast. Its name derives from the Middle English word bourne, meaning a small river. It also gives its name to the BCP Council ward of Alderney and Bourne Valley in Poole. Approximately 70% of the Bourne's drainage basin lies within the boundaries of the Borough of Poole.

== Course ==
The River Bourne rises in Poole beneath Ringwood Road at the confluence of three culverts; one is believed to drain Canford Heath, another drains the effluent from the water works on Francis Avenue, and the third is fed by Ringwood Road's surface water drainage. It first flows through an artificial lagoon and wetland built as part of a sustainable urban drainage system between 2000 and 2001, before following a relatively straight course east to a man-made pond at the end of Scott Road.

From the Scott Road Pond, it continues to flow east, parallel to Bloxworth Road, before flowing into South Park Road Pond just upstream of Alder Road. South Park Road Pond formed after the demolition of a factory on the west side of Alder Road and it was supplemented by an artificial reed bed excavated in September, 2003, by the Bourne Stream Partnership. The pond drains through a culvert beneath Alder Road, and the river then flows through Talbot Heath.

On Talbot Heath, the Bourne turns south and flows beneath the South West Main Line and Wren Crescent into Coy Pond, an ornamental pond and former decoy built in 1888. The river then drains through a grate at the southern end of the pond and flows beneath Coy Pond Road before entering Coy Pond Gardens near a footbridge where it is joined from the right by its main tributary, Kinson Brook. It flows through Coy Pond Gardens to Poole's boundary where it enters Bournemouth Gardens, a Grade II listed public garden centred on the river which extends all the way to the Bournemouth Pier Approach.

Beneath the pier approach, the Bourne reaches a weir which it only overtops during heavy rainfall. In normal conditions, the Bourne flows directly into Poole Bay through an offshore combined sewer outfall. This is due to diffuse pollution in the river's catchment from 62 recorded surface water drain outfalls threatening the quality of the bathing water on Bournemouth Beach. When river flow exceeds the capacity of the sewer, the Bourne flows over the weir and into Poole Bay through a concrete outfall east of Bournemouth Pier.

== Wildlife ==
Upstream of the gardens, the Bourne Valley is a Site of Special Scientific Interest under Section 28 of the Wildlife and Countryside Act 1981. The valley plays host to threatened species including the Dartford warbler, the sand lizard, the European water vole, and dragonflies. The river has a population of common roach, which were introduced by the Bourne Stream Partnership.

=== Species found in Scott Road Pond ===
The following species were found in the Scott Road Pond in a 2006 survey:

- smooth newt
- greater water boatman
- lesser water boatman
- mayfly
- hog louse
- diving beetle
- water-flea
- damselfly nymphs
- ramshorn snail
- freshwater shrimp
- leeches
- flatworms
- orb shell
- great pond snail
- midge
- screech beetle
- pond skater
- water stick-insect
- bloodworm
- sludge worm
- caddisfly
- bladder snail
- wandering snail

=== 2005 Scott Road Pond fish kill ===
On the 11th of July, 2005, an unidentified chemical was spilled in the industrial estate on Leyland Road in Wallisdown. To make the area safe, the chemical was rinsed into the surface water drainage system leading to the River Bourne. At least 200 roach died over the 11th and 12th of July along with an unknown number of amphibians and invertebrates. The pond at Alder Road was unaffected.

== History ==
Bournemouth was established in the Bourne Valley as a health resort by George Tapps-Gervis in 1836. The location of Bournemouth Square was originally the point at which the road leading from Poole to Christchurch and Holdenhurst and the road from Christchurch to Wimborne Minster converged to cross the Bourne on a wooden plank bridge.

The Bourne Valley was chosen by the town commissioners of Bournemouth as the location of the Bournemouth Gas & Water Works in 1863. The site, which was then part of the Branksome Estate in the parish of Kinson, was selected as it lay outside of the town's boundaries and kept the air pollution resulting from the production of town gas away from prospective holiday makers. The municipal water supply was initially abstracted from Kinson Brook just upstream of the confluence. This source was later supplemented by another on the River Stour in Longham.

In 1886, a drought rendered the town's water supply at Longham inoperative and the supply from Kinson Brook was unable to keep up with demand. Water was drawn from the Bourne to cover the shortfall but the river had become heavily polluted by both domestic and agricultural runoff.

The River Bourne was condemned for drinking purposes because of the soapsuds and the overflow from pigsties that trickled into it. But the summer of 1886 was very hot and dry and the only way of getting enough water was to use that flowing down the Bourne. In order to prevent an undue amount of added flavour in the water supply, we had to scrub the whole length of the river from the works to the source with brooms! It was a very near thing although the water was, of course, carefully filtered, and we did it successfully for no complaints came through of any pig wash epidemic.

— George Allen, Bourne Valley, Confluence: 150 Years of Service 1863-2013 (2013)

As part of broader works to reduce sewage pollution in Poole Bay, the Bourne was diverted into a combined sewer. The pumping station at the mouth of the Bourne Valley along with the inland treatment works to which it connects are honoured by a plaque on Bournemouth Pier Approach unveiled by Mayor B. G. Dillon on the 27th of March, 1974.
