= Kinson =

Suburb of Bournemouth, England

Coordinates: 50.769°N 1.903°W

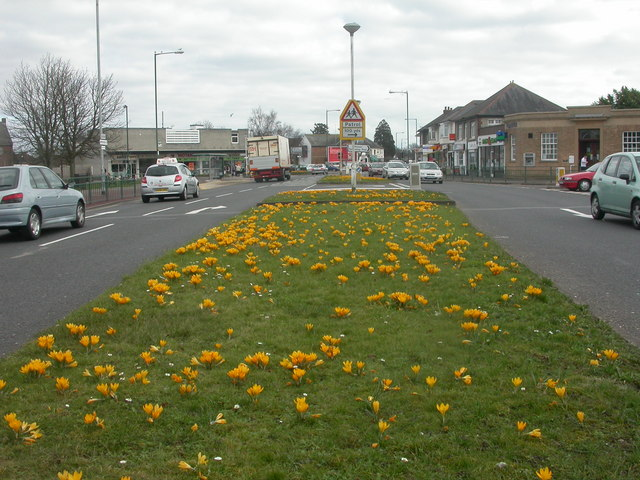
- Wimborne Road, Kinson

- Location within Dorset
- Population: 10,229
- OS grid reference: SZ070966
- Unitary authority: Bournemouth, Christchurch and Poole
- Ceremonial county: Dorset
- Region: South West
- Country: England
- Sovereign state: United Kingdom
- Post town: BOURNEMOUTH
- Postcode district: BH10, BH11
- Dialling code: 01202
- Police: Dorset
- Fire: Dorset and Wiltshire
- Ambulance: South Western
- UK Parliament: Bournemouth West

Kinson is a former village which has been absorbed by the town of Bournemouth, in the Bournemouth, Christchurch and Poole district, in the ceremonial county of Dorset, England. The area became part of Bournemouth district on 1 April 1931. There were two electoral wards containing the name Kinson (North & South). Their joint population at the 2011 census was 19,824.

The village has a shopping centre and a pub, Gulliver’s Tavern, known for much of the 19th and 20th centuries as 'The Dolphin Inn', after the boat named Dolphin owned by Isaac Gulliver. Kinson nearly became part of Poole in 1931; however, a vigorous campaign by the residents saw the parish added to Bournemouth instead, necessitating an adjustment to the Hampshire/Dorset county boundary, which had separated the two areas.

The area centres on Kinson village green which is on the Wimborne Road (at this point the A341) next to Kinson Library (now part of The Kinson Hub). The present green, which features a set of stocks, was once the site of the village school. The 1887 Ordnance Survey map for Kinson shows the school, which is now on a site to the south off Kinson Road. By the time of the 1949 survey maps, a library had taken the place of the old school. It was only when the library moved to a new location nearby that the old school/library site was combined with the village pound to form a new village green. A commemorative stone bench was officially unveiled by Mayor Benwell and his wife. The older village green, where cricket matches were played, has now become a development of bungalows, with the name Wicket Road surviving to mark its older use.

== History ==
Kinson was named in the Domesday Book in 1086, in the Cogdean Hundred.

== Kinson Common ==
Nearby is Kinson Common, a Local Nature Reserve and Site of Special Scientific Interest, and the historic St Andrew's Church, a grade B listed building and the resting place of Frederick Ponsonby.

Kinson Common is a relatively small site of 16ha (40 acres) owned by Bournemouth, Christchurch and Poole Council, and despite its small size it provides a rich and varied habitat. The Friends of Kinson Common work as Countryside Volunteers and help with the management of the site. An 1843 tithe map, held at the Dorset County Records Office, shows that the land then formed part of Howe Farm. Since 1933 the local authority purchased a number of parcels of land (mostly from Viscount Wimborne) for the purposes of Kinson Cemetery and as public open space. In 1988 Kinson Common was designated as an SSSI, becoming an LNR in 1995.

== St. Andrew's Church ==
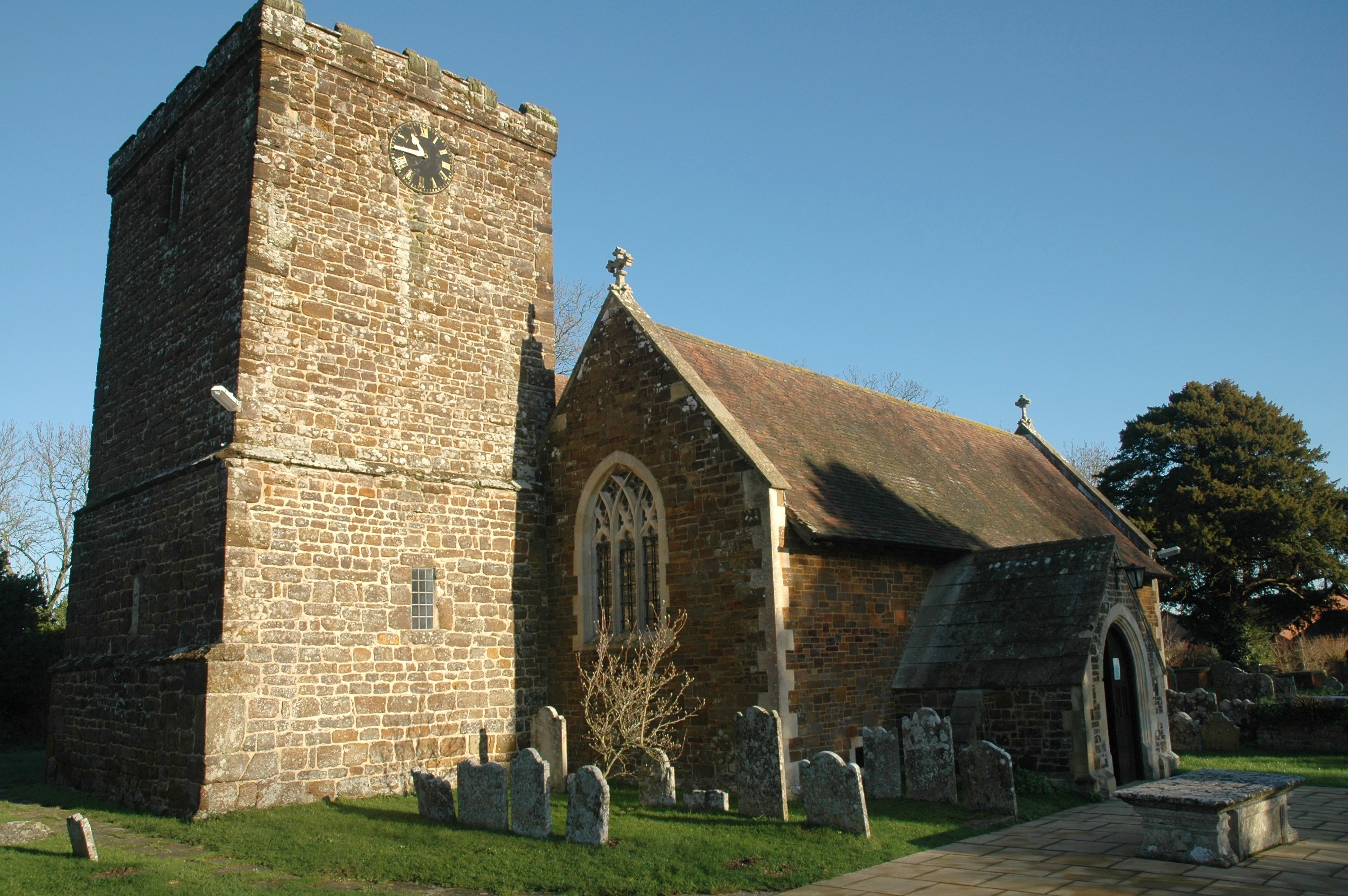
St. Andrew's Church

Kinson Parish, within the Manor of Canford Magna, is centred on the site of a Saxon church. The parish boundaries extend far beyond Kinson Village, taking in various hamlets, Cudnell (or Bear Cross), High Howe, West Howe, Howe, East Howe, and Ensbury. These hamlets gave rise to the names of several 20th-century housing estates, although the origins of their names is debatable. The 'howe' form appears to be an old English word for a mound. This could either be a topographical feature, as the gravel terraces along the south of the River Stour have been carved into rounded promontories by small rills and streams; but 'howe' could also refer to the various burial mounds which formerly covered the slopes.

The area was historically used by the smuggler Isaac Gulliver whose men would carry the contraband up from The Chines in Poole Bay and take it across Cranborne Chase to be distributed to patrons all over Southern England. Gulliver had several properties in the area; however, all of the contraband were stored in the tower of St Andrew's Church (the marks of the ropes used to haul it up can still be seen in the soft sandstone walls of the tower) and in several stone graves in the churchyard which were constructed for this purpose and never saw a coffin. A tunnel was also reputed to exist to allow smugglers to escape to the local river under cover (this has never been proved, however).

Also in the churchyard is the grave of one Robert Trotman, who was killed when trying to land contraband on the shore near Poole. Smugglers at the time were regarded by some as folk heroes, as they circumvented high government taxes on goods such as alcohol, tobacco, etc. The presence of this grave openly in the churchyard, with its rhyming elegy to the deceased, is an interesting comment on the social status at the time of people who were technically criminals.

Near this church is a bridge over Millham's Splash, a small offshoot of the River Stour. In the early years of the twentieth century this was a ford, and while travelling by carriage from Canford House to Highcliffe Castle the future Kaiser of Germany became bogged in the water and had to be rescued by the locals. They had cause to regret this act before very long with the outbreak of World War I.

Some descendants of Isaac Gulliver remained in Kinson and brought it a further notable connection. Isaac's grandson Isaac Fryer lived at Kinson House, which passed to his daughter Ada Russell. Ada's sister-in-law Isabella Russell was the grandmother of Agnes Sybil Thorndike, the actress, who spent several childhood holidays at Kinson. In the hamlet of Ensbury the Rev. John Hiley Austen lived in the ancient Ensbury Manor. He was an antiquarian, collector of fossils, and the author of 'A Guide to the Geology of the Isle of Purbeck and the South-West Coast of Hampshire'.

== Politics ==
Kinson is part of the Bournemouth West parliamentary constituency. Kinson is also the main part of the Kinson ward which elects three councillors to Bournemouth, Christchurch and Poole Council.

Kingstone was formerly a tything and chapelry in the parish of Great Canford, in 1866 Kinson became a separate civil parish, on 1 April 1931 the parish was abolished and merged with Bournemouth. In 1921 the parish had a population of 3429. It is now in the unparished area of Bournemouth.
