= List of places in Dorset =

Some of the larger settlements of Dorset.

This is a list of settlements and other places in Dorset, England. Towns, and settlements with populations over 3,000, are listed in bold; other settlements in plain text.

== A ==
- Abbotsbury, Affpuddle, Alderholt, Alderney, Alder Hills, Alexandra Park, Allington, Alton Pancras, Arne, Ashley Cross, Ashmore, Ashington, Askerswell, Avon Beach

== B ==
- Baiter Park, Batcombe, Beacon Hill, **Beaminster**, Bear Cross, Bearwood, Belchalwell, Bere Regis, Bettiscombe, Bincombe, Bishop's Caundle, Blackdown, Blackwater, **Blandford Forum**, Bloxworth, Bookham, **Boscombe**, Bothenhampton, **Bournemouth**, Bournemouth Town Centre, Bourton, Bradford Abbas, Bradford Peverell, Bradpole, Branksome, Branksome Park, Branksome Woods, **Bridport**, Broadmayne, Broadstone, Broadwey, Broadwindsor, Bryanston, Buckhorn Weston, Buckland Newton, Buckland Ripers, Burstock, Burton Bradstock, Burton

== C ==
- Canford Cliffs, **Canford Heath**, Canford Magna, Cann, Castleton, Castletown, Cattistock, Caundle Marsh, Cerne Abbas, Chalbury, Chaldon Herring, Charlestown, Charlton Marshall, Charminster (West Dorset), Charminster (Bournemouth), Charmouth, Chedington, Cheselbourne, Chetnole, Chettle, **Chickerell**, Chideock, Child Okeford, Chilfrome, Chiswell, **Christchurch**, Christchurch Town Centre, Church Knowle, Clifton Maybank, **Colehill**, Compton Abbas, Compton Valence, Coombe Keynes, Corfe Castle, **Corfe Mullen**, Corscombe, Coryates, County Gates, Cranborne, Creekmoor, Crendell, Cripplestyle, Crossways

== D ==
- Dewlish, **Dorchester**, Drimpton, Duntish, Durweston

== E ==
- East Cliff, East Compton, East Creech, East Howe, East Knighton, East Lulworth, East Orchard, East Pulham, East Stoke, East Stour, Easton, Ebblake, Edmondsham, Ensbury Park, Evening Hill, Evershot

== F ==
- Fairmile, Farnham, **Ferndown**, Fiddleford, Fifehead Magdalen, Fifehead Neville, Fifehead St Magdalen, Fifehead St Quintin, Fishpond Bottom, Fleet, Fleetsbridge, Folke, Fontmell Magna, Fortuneswell, Frampton, Friars Cliff, Frome St Quintin, Frome Vauchurch, Furzehill

== G ==
- **Gillingham**, Glanvilles Wootton, Goathill, Godmanstone, Gussage All Saints, Gussage St. Andrew, Gussage St. Michael, Guy's Marsh

== H ==
- Halstock, Hammoon, Hampreston, Hamworthy, Hazelbury Bryan, Hengistbury Head, Hermitage, Herston, Highcliffe, Higher Wraxall, Hilfield, Hill View, Hilton, Hinton, Hinton Martell, Hinton Parva, Hinton St Mary, Hoburne Park, Holdenhurst, Holnest, Holt, Holway, Holwell, Holywell Hooke, Horton, Hurn

== I ==
- Ibberton, Iford, Iwerne Courtney, Iwerne Minster

== K ==
- Kimmeridge, Kings Park, King's Stag, Kingston (North Dorset), Kingston (Purbeck), Kingston Russell, Kington Magna, Kinson, Knighton Heath, Knowlton

== L ==
- Langton Herring, Langton Matravers, Lansdowne, Leigh, Lillington, Lilliput, Littlebredy, Littledown, Littlemoor, Litton Cheney, Loders, Longfleet, Long Bredy, Long Crichel, Longburton, Lower Mannington, Lower Wraxall, Lydlinch, **Lyme Regis**, **Lytchett Matravers**, Lytchett Minster

== M ==
- Maiden Newton, Mannings Heath, Mannington, Manston, Mapperton, Mappowder, Margaret Marsh, Marnhull, Marshwood, Melbury Abbas, Melbury Bubb, Melbury Osmond, Melcombe Horsey, Melcombe Regis, Melplash, Merley, Meyrick Park, Middle Beach, Milborne St Andrew, Milton Abbas, Milton on Stour, Minterne Magna, Moordown, Moor Crichel, Morcombelake, Morden, Moreton, Motcombe, Mosterton, Muccleshell, Mudeford, Muscliff

== N ==
- Netherbury, Nether Cerne, Nether Compton, Nettlecombe, Newtown, Northbourne, Nottington

== O ==
- Oakdale, Oakley, Oborne, Okeford Fitzpaine, Organford, Osmington, Osmington Mills, Over Compton, Overcombe, Owermoigne, Oxbridge

== P ==
- Pamphill, Parkstone, Peacemarsh, Penn Hill, Pentridge, Piddlehinton, Piddletrenthide, Pilsdon, Pimperne, Plush, Pokesdown, **Poole**, Poole Town Centre, Portesham, Portfield, **Isle of Portland**, Poundbury, Powerstock, Poxwell, Poyntington, Preston, Puddletown, Pulham, Puncknowle, Purewell, Purse Caundle, Putton

== R ==
- Radipole, Rampisham, Redhill, Ridge, Ringstead, Rockley Park, Rodwell, Rossmore, Ryall, Ryme Intrinseca

== S ==
- Sandbanks, Sandford, Sandford Orcas, Seaborough, Seatown, Sea View, **Shaftesbury**, Shapwick, **Sherborne**, Shillingstone, Shipton Gorge, Shitterton, Silton, Sixpenny Handley, Slades Farm, Slepe, Somerford, Southbourne, South Perrott, Southwell, Spetisbury, Springbourne, **St Ives**, St Leonards, Stalbridge, Stanbridge, Stanley Green, Stanpit, Stanton St Gabriel, Steeple, Sterte, Stinsford, Stoborough, Stoborough Green, Stockwood, Stoke Abbott, Stoke Wake, Stourpaine, Stour Provost, Stour Row, Stourton Caundle, Stratton, Strouden Park, Studland, Sturminster Marshall, **Sturminster Newton**, Sutton Poyntz, Sutton Waldron, **Swanage**, Swyre, Sydling St Nicholas, Symondsbury

== T ==
- Talbot Heath, Talbot Village, Talbot Woods, Tarrant Gunville, Tarrant Hinton, Tarrant Keyneston, Tarrant Launceston, Tarrant Monkton, Tarrant Rawston, Tarrant Rushton, Thorncombe, Thornford, Throop, Tincleton, Todber, Toller Fratrum, Toller Porcorum, Toller Whelme, Tolpuddle, Townsend, Trent, Trickett's Cross, Tuckton, Turbary Park, Turlin Moor, Turners Puddle, Turnworth, Tyneham

== U ==
- Up Cerne, Up Sydling, Uploders, **Upton**, Upwey

== V ==
- **Verwood**, Victoria Park

== W ==
- Wallisdown, Wakeham, Walkford, **Wareham**, Warmwell, Warren Hill, Waterloo, Westbourne, Westham, West Bexington, West Chelborough, West Cliff, West Compton, West Howe, West Knighton, West Lulworth, **West Moors**, West Orchard, **West Parley**, West Stafford, West Stour, **Weymouth**, Whitchurch Canonicorum, Whitcombe, Whitecliff, Wick, **Wimborne Minster**, Wimborne St Giles, Winfrith Newburgh, Winkton, Winterborne Came, Winterborne Herringston, Winterborne Houghton, Winterborne Kingston, Winterborne St Martin, Winterborne Monkton, Winterborne Stickland, Winterborne Whitechurch, Winterborne Zelston, Winterbourne Abbas, Winterbourne Steepleton, Winton, Witchampton, Withybed Wood, Woodbridge, Woodlands, Woodsford, Woodyates, **Wool**, Woolland, Wootton Fitzpaine, Worgret, Worth Matravers, **Wyke Regis**, Wynford Eagle

== Y ==
- Yetminster

== See also ==
- List of beaches in Dorset
- Villages of Portland
- List of settlements in Dorset by population
- List of areas in Bournemouth, Christchurch and Poole
