= List of areas in Bournemouth, Christchurch and Poole =

Bournemouth, Christchurch and Poole ward map

Bournemouth, Christchurch and Poole is a local government district in Dorset, England, containing the towns of Bournemouth, Christchurch and Poole, with numerous neighbourhoods and suburbs.

== Bournemouth ==
- Alum Chine
- Bear Cross
- Boscombe
- Bournemouth town centre
- Bournemouth University
- Branksome Woods
- Charminster
- Durley Chine
- East Cliff
- East Howe
- Ensbury Park
- Hengistbury Head
- Hill View
- Holdenhurst
- Iford
- Kings Park
- Kinson
- Knighton Heath
- Lansdowne
- Littledown
- Mayfield Park
- Meyrick Park
- Moordown
- Muccleshell
- Muscliff
- Northbourne
- Pokesdown
- Queen's Park
- Redhill
- Richmond Hill
- Richmond Park
- Slades Farm
- Southbourne
- Springbourne
- Strouden Park
- Talbot Heath
- Talbot Village
- Talbot Woods
- Throop
- Townsend
- Tuckton
- Turbary Park
- Victoria Park
- Wallisdown
- Warren Hill
- Westbourne
- West Cliff
- West Howe
- Wick
- Winton
- Withybed Wood
- Woodbury

== Christchurch ==
- Avon Beach
- Blackwater
- Burton
- Christchurch town centre
- Fairmile
- Friars Cliff
- Highcliffe
- Hoburne Park
- Hurn
- Jumpers Common
- Mudeford
- Portfield
- Purewell
- Somerford
- Stanpit
- Walkford
- Winkton

== Poole ==
- Alder Hills
- Alderney
- Alexandra Park
- Ashington
- Ashley Cross
- Baiter Park
- Bearwood
- Branksome
- Branksome Park
- Broadstone
- Canford Cliffs
- Canford Heath
- Canford Magna
- County Gates
- Creekmoor
- Evening Hill
- Fleetsbridge
- Hamworthy
- Heatherlands
- Holes Bay
- Lilliput
- Longfleet
- Mannings Heath
- Merley
- Oakley
- Newtown
- Oakdale
- Parkstone
- Penn Hill
- Poole Harbour
- Poole Park
- Poole town centre
- Rockley Park
- Rossmore
- Salterns Marina
- Sandbanks
- Sea View
- Stanley Green
- Sterte
- Talbot Village
- Turlin Moor
- Wallisdown
- Waterloo
- Whitecliff

== See also ==
- List of civil parishes in Dorset
