= BCP Independent Group =

British political party

- Founded: 2023
- Ideology: Non-partisan politics
- Bournemouth, Christchurch and Poole Council: 5 / 76

BCP Independent Group or Bournemouth Independents Group is a local political grouping on Bournemouth, Christchurch and Poole Council. It is made up of independent Bournemouth councillors formerly from the Conservative and Labour parties.

== History ==
The political grouping was established following the 2023 Bournemouth, Christchurch and Poole Council election. The Bournemouth Independents Group elected Vikki Slade as council leader and became part of 'the Three Towns Alliance'. In April 2025, councillor Karen Rampton resigned from the Conservative Party. In July 2025, Labour councillor Michelle Dower resigned from Labour Party and joined the group.

== Members ==
As of October 2025:

Councillor	Ward	Elected as	Ref.
Stephen Bartlett	Redhill and Northbourne	Conservative in 2015, Independent in 2019 and 2023	
Michelle Dower	Kinson	Labour in 2023	
Jackie Edwards	Redhill and Northbourne	Conservative in 2019, Independent in 2023	
Gillian Martin	Boscombe West	Labour in 2023	
Karen Rampton	Talbot and Branksome Woods	Conservative in 2019 and 2023	

== See also ==
- List of political parties in the United Kingdom
- Christchurch Independents
