= Turbary Park =

Area of West Howe, Bournemouth, Dorset

Coordinates: 50°45′09″N 1°55′02″W

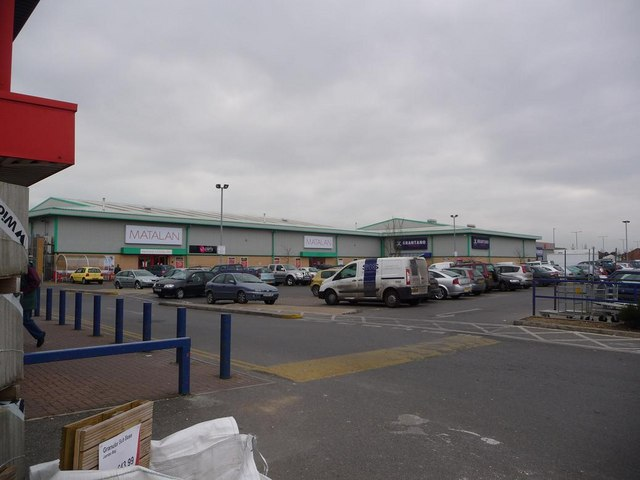
- Turbary Retail Park

- Location within Dorset
- OS grid reference: SZ128952
- Unitary authority: Bournemouth, Christchurch and Poole
- Ceremonial county: Dorset
- Region: South West
- Country: England
- Sovereign state: United Kingdom
- Post town: BOURNEMOUTH
- Postcode district: BH8
- Dialling code: 01202
- Police: Dorset
- Fire: Dorset and Wiltshire
- Ambulance: South Western
- UK Parliament: Bournemouth West

Turbary Park is a suburb of Bournemouth in Dorset. Turbary Park is located south of Kinson and West Howe, west of East Howe and Ensbury Park, west of Knighton Heath and north of Wallisdown.

== Geography ==
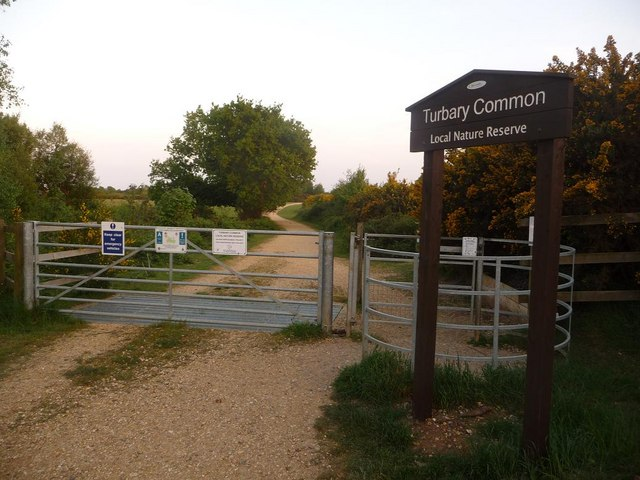
The West Howe entrance to Turbary Common.

Turbary Common is the largest area of heathland in North Bournemouth. It is also a Site of Special Scientific Interest. The habitats include scrub, wooded areas and both wet and dry heath.

== Transportation ==
The main road though the suburb is Turbary Park Avenue which runs between housing and Turbary Common. In 2012, the road got its first crossing.

== Facilities ==
Turbary Park is served by the Turbary Retail Park. Also in the area is the NHS Turbary Park Medical Centre.

== Politics ==
Turbary Park is part of the Bournemouth West constituency. Turbary Park is part of the Kinson ward which elects three councillors to Bournemouth, Christchurch and Poole Council.
