= Heatherlands =

Heatherlands may refer to:

- Heatherlands, Poole, a suburb in England
- Heatherlands, Western Cape, in Australia
