= Kinson (ward) =

Electoral ward in Bournemouth, Dorset, England

Boundary of Kinson in Bournemouth, Christchurch and Poole.

Kinson is an electoral ward in Bournemouth, Dorset, England. Since 2019, the ward has elected 3 councillors to Bournemouth, Christchurch and Poole Council.

== History ==
The Kinson area was formerly part of two wards on Bournemouth Borough Council; Kinson North and Kinson South.

Kinson has elected councillors from Labour and the Liberal Democrats since 1999, but elected 3 Conservatives in 2019.

In 2021, former Kinson North councillor David Turtle was jailed for the murder of his wife.

In July 2025, councillor Michelle Dower resigned from Labour Party.

In October 2025, the two Conservative councillors defected to Reform UK.

== Geography ==
The Kinson ward covers the suburb of Kinson, as well as the areas of West Howe and Turbary Park, as well as parts of East Howe.

== Councillors ==
Election	Councillors		
2019	Duane Farr (Conservative)	Laurence Fear (Conservative)	Norman Decent (Conservative)
2023	Duane Farr (Conservative)	Cameron Adams (Conservative)	Michelle Dower (Labour)
2025	Duane Farr (Reform UK)	Cameron Adams (Reform UK)	Michelle Dower (BCP Independent)

== Election results ==
=== 2023 ===
Kinson
Party	Candidate	Votes	%	±%
Conservative	Cameron Ralph Adams	1,092	36.7	+9.4
Conservative	Duane William Farr‡	1,063	35.7	+4.0
Labour Co-op	Michelle Andrea Dower	1,062	35.7	+12.1
Labour Co-op	Paul Victor Williams	1,029	34.6	+11.6
Conservative	Laurence Martin Peter Fear‡	964	32.4	+2.7
Labour Co-op	Zach Eli David Griffiths	958	32.2	+10.3
Liberal Democrats	Neil Graeme Atkinson	579	19.4	+11.5
Liberal Democrats	Claire Smith	560	18.8	+11.2
Liberal Democrats	Richard Paul Smith	473	15.9	N/A
Green	Jemima Jane Elizabeth Astill	339	11.4	−3.3
Independent	Sue Lennon	277	9.3	+2.8
Majority				
Rejected ballots		9	0.1	
Turnout		2,978	23.21	−3.33
Conservative hold		Swing		
Conservative hold		Swing		
Labour Co-op gain from Conservative		Swing		

=== 2019 ===
2019 Bournemouth, Christchurch and Poole Council election: Kinson (3 seats)
Party	Candidate	Votes	%	±%
Conservative	Duane Farr	1,086	31.7	
Conservative	Laurence Fear	1,019	29.7	
Conservative	Norman Decent	937	27.3	
Labour	Catherine Gutmann Roberts	810	23.6	
Labour	Joanne Oldale	787	23.0	
Labour	Carl Richards	752	21.9	
Independent	Mark Battistini	682	19.9	
Independent	Amadeo Angiolini	665	19.4	
UKIP	Melita Jeffries	656	19.1	
Independent	John Perkins	520	15.2	
Green	Carla Gregory-May	505	14.7	
Liberal Democrats	Jack Holliss	270	7.9	
Liberal Democrats	Ann Smith	262	7.6	
Engage	Susan Lennon	224	6.5	
Majority				
Turnout		3,428	26.54	
Conservative win (new seat)				
Conservative win (new seat)				
Conservative win (new seat)				
