= Putton =

Suburb of Weymouth, Dorset, England

Coordinates: 50°37′13.7″N 2°29′51.2″W

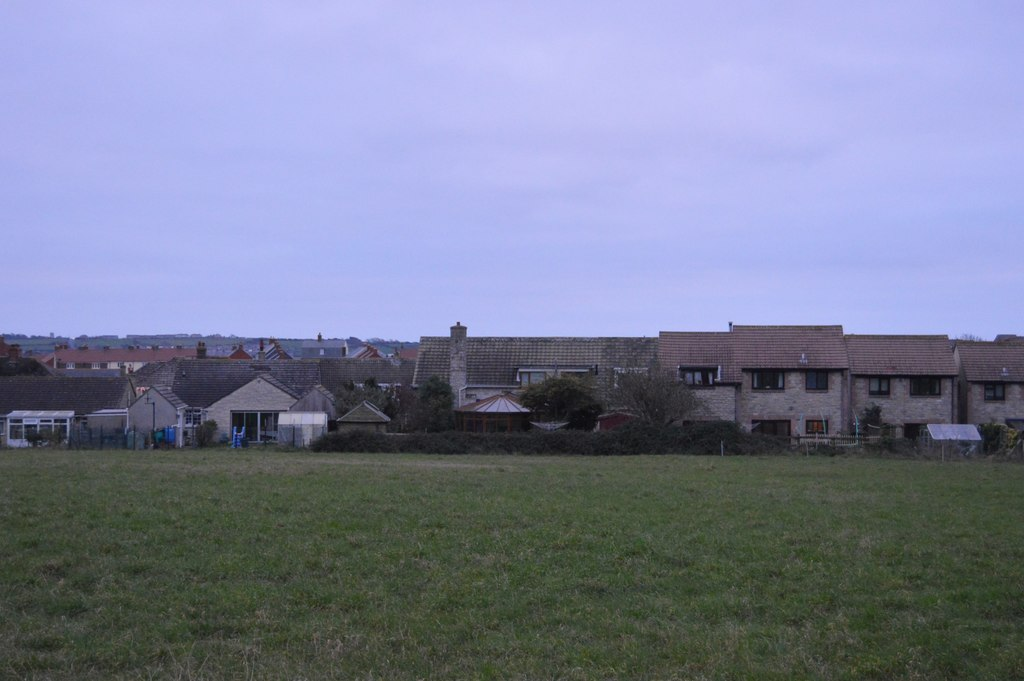
- Houses at Lower Putton Lane

- Location within Dorset
- Civil parish: Chickerell
- Unitary authority: Dorset
- Ceremonial county: Dorset
- Region: South West
- Country: England
- Sovereign state: United Kingdom
- Post town: Weymouth
- Postcode district: DT4
- Police: Dorset
- Fire: Dorset and Wiltshire
- Ambulance: South Western
- UK Parliament: West Dorset

Putton is a suburb of Weymouth in Dorset, England, located between Chickerell and Charlestown.

== History ==
Putton is a recognised deserted medieval settlement which was first documented in 1237.

An act known as the Putton Inclosure Act 1789 described: Putton, alias Podington, in the Village or Tything of Easton, in the Parish of Chickerill, alias West Chickerill, in the County of Dorset.

An archaeological dig from 2016 and 2017 revealed evidence of a significant part of a manorial settlement dating from the 12th century.

== Politics ==
For local government, Putton is in the Dorset unitary authority represented by the Chickerell electoral ward which elects 2 members to Dorset Council.

For elections to the UK Parliament, Chickerell is in the West Dorset parliamentary constituency.

== See also ==
- List of places in Dorset
