= Boscombe West =

Ward in Bournemouth, Dorset

- ward Bournemouth, Christchurch and Poole Council
- Boundary of Boscombe West in Bournemouth, Christchurch and Poole.
- Major settlements: Boscombe

Current ward
- Created: 2019
- Councillor: Patrick Canavan (Labour)
- Councillor: Gillian Mary Martin (Labour)
- Created from: Boscombe West

2003–2019
- Number of councillors: 3
- UK Parliament constituency: Bournemouth East

Boscombe West is a ward in Bournemouth, Dorset. Since 2019, the ward has elected 2 councillors to Bournemouth, Christchurch and Poole Council.

== History ==
The ward was formerly used for elections to Bournemouth Borough Council, which it elected three councillors. The current ward has slightly different boundaries, covering part of the former Bournemouth ward of Boscombe East.

In 2025, Gillian Martin resigned from the Labour Party.

== Geography ==
The ward covers the western areas of Boscombe. It is part of the Bournemouth East parliamentary constituency.

== Demographics ==
Boscombe West is one of the most diverse wards in the whole of the South East Dorset conurbation. The average age of residents is older than the England and Wales average.

== Councillors ==
Election	Councillors		
2011	Jane Kelly (Conservative)	Christopher Wakefield (Conservative)	Philip Stanley-Watts (Conservative)
2015	Jane Kelly (Conservative)	Christopher Wakefield (Conservative)	Philip Stanley-Watts (Conservative)
BCP	Jane Kelly (Conservative)	Lewis Allison (Labour)	Seat Abolished
2019	Jane Kelly (Conservative)	Lewis Allison (Labour)	Seat Abolished
2023	Patrick Canavan (Labour)	Gillian Mary Martin (Labour)	Seat Abolished

== Election results ==
=== 2019 ===
Boscombe West (2 seats)
Party	Candidate	Votes	%	±%
Conservative	Jane Kelly	666	37.1	
Labour	Lewis Allison	618	34.4	
Conservative	Philip Stanley-Watts	591	32.9	
Labour	Sara Armstrong	539	30.0	
Green	Anne Cassels	518	28.8	
Liberal Democrats	Paul Radcliffe	316	17.6	
Majority				
Turnout		1,796	23.47%	
Conservative win (new seat)				
Labour win (new seat)				

=== 2011 ===
Boscombe West (3 seats)
Party	Candidate	Votes	%	±%
Conservative	Jane Kelly	747		
Conservative	Christopher Wakefield	723		
Conservative	Philip Stanley-Watts	686		
Liberal Democrats	Lisa Northover	537		
Liberal Democrats	Maan Basma	420		
Labour	Mike Goff	350		
Liberal Democrats	Peter Pull	336		
Labour	Bob Milner	309		
Labour	Ian Taylor	279		
Green	Damian Maguire	261		
Independent	Angus Reid	187		
Independent	Michal Figat	150		
Turnout			26.49	
Conservative hold		Swing		
Conservative hold		Swing		
Conservative gain from Liberal Democrats		Swing		
