= Redhill and Northbourne =

Electoral ward in Bournemouth, Dorset, England

Boundary of Redhill and Northbourne in Bournemouth, Christchurch and Poole.

Redhill and Northbourne is a ward in Bournemouth, Dorset. Since 2019, the ward has elected 2 councillors to Bournemouth, Christchurch and Poole Council.

== History ==
The ward formerly elected councillors to Bournemouth Borough Council before it was abolished in 2019.

== Geography ==
Redhill and Northbourne ward is the north of Bournemouth, covering the suburbs of Redhill, Northbourne and Hill View, the northern areas of Ensbury Park and the eastern areas of East Howe.

== Councillors ==
Two Independent councillors. On 3 October 2022, Jackie Edwards left the Conservatives to sit as an independent.

Election	Councillors	
2019	Stephen Bartlett (Independent)	Jackie Edwards (Conservative)
2022	Stephen Bartlett (Independent)	Jackie Edwards (Independent)
2023	Stephen Bartlett (Independent)	Jackie Edwards (Independent)

== Election results ==
=== 2023 ===
Redhill and Northbourne
Party	Candidate	Votes	%	±%
Liberal Democrats	Ines Antunovic Thomson	193	8.9	
Independent	Stephen Gordon George Bartlett‡	844	38.9	−10.3
Liberal Democrats	Heather Margaret Dalziel	273	12.6	+3.3
Green	Carwyn Geraint Davies	246	11.3	
Independent	Jackie Edwards‡ (Note: Elected as Conservative)	751	34.6	+9.2
Conservative	Karen Jill Hay	551	25.4	
Labour	Ruth Messer	419	19.3	
Labour	Ann Williams	387	17.8	+6.6
Conservative	Daniel Charles Wilson	503	23.2	
Majority				
Turnout				
		Swing		
		Swing		

=== 2019 ===
2019 Bournemouth, Christchurch and Poole Council election: Redhill and Northbourne (2 seats)
Party	Candidate	Votes	%	±%
Independent	Stephen Bartlett	1,281	49.2	
Conservative	Jackie Edwards	660	25.4	
Independent	Richard Sheridan	654	25.1	
Conservative	David D'Orton-Gibson	639	24.6	
UKIP	Marilyn Day	372	14.3	
Labour	Ann Williams	292	11.2	
Green	Martine Smid-Weevers	282	10.8	
Liberal Democrats	Heather Dalziel	243	9.3	
Labour	Darren Taylor	212	8.1	
Liberal Democrats	Phillip Lucas	155	6.0	
Majority				
Turnout		2,602	34.39%	
Independent win (new seat)				
Conservative win (new seat)				
