= 2023 Bournemouth, Christchurch and Poole Council election =

2023 English local election

- 4 May 2023

All 76 seats on Bournemouth, Christchurch and Poole Council 39 seats needed for a majority
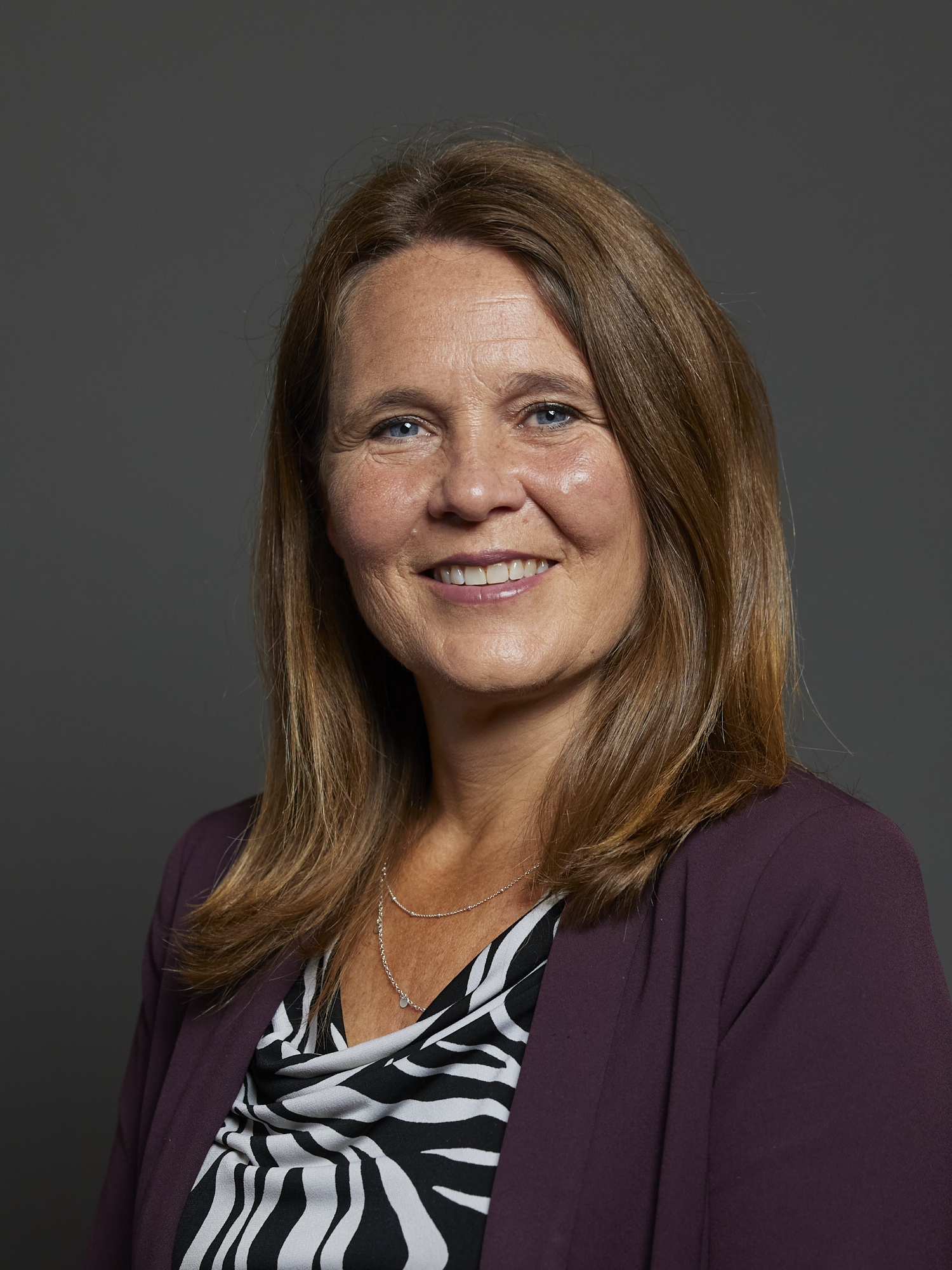

	First party	Second party	Third party
Leader	Vikki Slade	Phil Broadhead	George Farquhar
Party	Liberal Democrats	Conservative	Labour
Last election	15 seats, 19.7%	36 seats, 32.2%	3 seats, 14.2%
Seats won	28	12	11
Seat change	▲13	▼24	▲8
Popular vote	62,357	51,323	30,437
Percentage	31.3%	25.8%	15.3%
Swing	▲8.9%	▼6.4%	▲1.1%
	Fourth party	Fifth party	Sixth party
Leader	Paul Hillard	Chris Rigby
Party	CI	Green	Independent
Last election	N/A	2 seats, 7.5%	11 seats, 14.2%
Seats won	8	5	5
Seat change	▲8	▲3	▼6
Popular vote	15,231	16,916	9,050
Percentage	7.7%	8.5%	4.5%
Swing	N/A	▲1.0%	▼9.7%
	Seventh party	Eighth party
Leader	Mark Howell	Judes Butt
Party	Poole People	Poole Engage
Last election	7 seats, 5.4%	0 seats, 0.3%
Seats won	5	2
Seat change	▼2	▲2
Popular vote	5,995	6,966
Percentage	3.0%	3.5%
Swing	▼2.4%	▲3.2%
- Winner of each seat at the 2023 Bournemouth, Christchurch and Poole Council election
Leader before election
Philip Broadhead
Conservative
No overall control
Leader after election
Vikki Slade
Liberal Democrats
No overall control

The 2023 Bournemouth, Christchurch and Poole Council election took place on 4 May 2023, to elect all 76 members of Bournemouth, Christchurch and Poole Council in Dorset, England.

The council stayed with no overall control but the Liberal Democrats became the largest single party. As no one party controlled a majority of the council the Liberal Democrats, Christchurch Independents, Poole People Party and The Bournemouth Independent Group subsequently formed a coalition administration known as the "Three Towns Alliance."

== Background ==
Prior to the election the council was under no overall control, being led by a minority Conservative administration. Eight registered political parties were represented on the council, in addition to eight independent councillors who did not belong to a party. Some of the parties and independents formed political groups:

- The "Poole Independents" group comprised the Poole People Party, the Alliance for Local Living and one of the independent councillors.
- The "Bournemouth Independent and Green" group comprised the Green Party and two of the independent councillors.

The other parties each formed their own groups, and the remaining five independent councillors were not aligned to any group.

== Councillors standing down ==
Councillor	Ward	First elected	Party	Date announced
Norman Decent	Kinson	2019	Conservative	10 May 2022
Mike Brooke	Broadstone	1999	Liberal Democrats	3 November 2022
Drew Mellor	Talbot and Branksome Woods	2019	Conservative	13 February 2023
Mike Greene	Bournemouth Central	2009	Conservative	25 February 2023
Nicola Greene	Westbourne and West Cliff	2007	Conservative	25 February 2023
Ann Stribley	Parkstone	1977	Conservative	30 March 2023
Lewis Allison	Boscombe West	2019	Labour	6 April 2023
Peter Hall	Christchurch Town	2015	Conservative	6 April 2023
Diana Butler	Creekmoor	2019	UKIP	6 April 2023
Mark Robson	Newtown and Heatherlands	2019	Liberal Democrats	6 April 2023
L-J Evans	Poole Town	2019	Poole People Party	6 April 2023
Susan Phillips	Wallisdown and Winton West	2011	Conservative	6 April 2023
Lisa Lewis	West Southbourne	2019	Labour	6 April 2023

== Parties ==
On 5 April 2023, the full list of candidates was published:

- Conservative Party 75 candidates
- Liberal Democrats 74 candidates
- Labour Party 55 candidates
- Green Party of England and Wales 38 candidates
- Poole Engage Party 16 candidates
- Christchurch Independents 10 candidates
- Poole People Party 8 candidates
- Animal Welfare Party 1 candidate
- Communist Party of Britain 1 candidate
- Heritage Party 1 candidate
- Reform UK 1 candidate

In addition, 33 Independent candidates, and 1 candidate without a description, sought election.

== Results summary ==
Following the results, the council remained in no overall control but the Liberal Democrats became the largest party with 13 gains. The Conservatives fell sharply from 34 to 12 seats. The Labour Party nearly quadrupled their seat total from 3 to 11. The Green Party went from 2 seats to 5.

2023 Bournemouth, Christchurch and Poole Council election
Party	Candidates	Seats	Gains	Losses	Net gain/loss	Seats %	Votes %	Votes	+/−
Liberal Democrats	74	28			▲13	36.8	31.3	62,357	+8.9
Conservative	75	12			▼24	15.8	25.8	51,323	–6.4
Labour	55	11			▲8	14.5	15.3	30,437	+1.1
CI	10	8			▲8	10.5	7.7	15,231	N/A
Green	38	5			▲3	6.6	8.5	16,916	+1.0
Independent	34	5			▼6	6.6	4.5	9,050	–9.7
Poole People	8	5			▼2	6.6	3.0	5,995	–2.4
Poole Engage	16	2			▲2	2.6	3.5	6,966	+3.2
Animal Welfare	1	0			Steady	0.0	0.1	239	N/A
Reform	1	0			Steady	0.0	0.1	189	N/A
Heritage	1	0			Steady	0.0	0.1	181	N/A
Communist	1	0			Steady	0.0	<0.1	40	N/A

UKIP and ALL both lost one seat, but are not shown in the table above as no candidates contested on behalf of those parties.

== Ward results ==
Incumbent councillors are indicated with '‡'.

=== Alderney and Bourne Valley ===
Alderney and Bourne Valley
Party	Candidate	Votes	%	±%
Liberal Democrats	Rachel Maidment‡	1,341	44.9	+11.5
Liberal Democrats	Tony Trent‡	1,314	44.0	+7.7
Liberal Democrats	Adrian Chapmanlaw	1,257	42.1	+12.2
Labour	Celia McCormack	716	24.0	+6.0
Labour	Philip Murray	655	21.9	+4.9
Labour	Stephen Sinsbury	613	20.5	+5.7
Conservative	Lisle Smith	579	19.4	−4.6
Conservative	Sam Way	542	18.2	−0.9
Conservative	Michael Labidi	535	17.9	−1.2
Green	Renato Colonna	371	12.4	N/A
Animal Welfare	Gavin Ridley	239	8.0	N/A
Independent	Martin Smalley	175	5.9	−3.0
Majority				
Turnout		2,985	25.18	−3.03%
Rejected ballots		14		
Liberal Democrats hold		Swing		
Liberal Democrats hold		Swing		
Liberal Democrats hold		Swing		

=== Bearwood and Merley ===
Bearwood and Merley
Party	Candidate	Votes	%	±%
Liberal Democrats	David Brown‡	2,502	67.5	+17.7
Liberal Democrats	Marcus Andrews‡	2,482	67.0	+23.4
Liberal Democrats	Richard Burton‡	2,414	65.1	+24.0
Conservative	Leona Allen	744	20.1	−6.9
Conservative	Debbie Ferguson	698	18.8	−3.6
Conservative	Roger Gregory	691	18.6	−3.6
Green	Alison Randall	403	10.9	+0.5
Labour	Siobhan Bardsley	350	9.4	+4.4
Majority				
Turnout		3,706	33.48%	−6.22%
Rejected ballots		16		
Liberal Democrats hold		Swing		
Liberal Democrats hold		Swing		
Liberal Democrats hold		Swing		

=== Boscombe East and Pokesdown ===
Boscombe East and Pokesdown
Party	Candidate	Votes	%	±%
Labour	George Farquhar‡	1,465	58.4	+28.1
Labour	Eleanor Connolly	1,232	49.1	+27.5
Independent	Andy Jones‡ (Note: Elected as Conservative)	429	17.1	−12.3
Conservative	Mariam Kazem-Malaki	398	15.9	−13.5
Green	Mike Squires	332	13.2	−13.4
Conservative	Gayatri Lokhande	326	13.0	−8.2
Liberal Democrats	Rebecca Edwards	307	12.2	−6.1
Liberal Democrats	James Lees	187	7.5	−6.6
Majority				
Turnout		2,507	31.90%	+1.04%
Rejected ballots		16		
Labour hold		Swing		
Labour gain from Conservative		Swing		

=== Boscombe West ===
Boscombe West
Party	Candidate	Votes	%	±%
Labour	Patrick Canavan	629	36.9	+2.5
Labour	Gillian Martin	627	36.8	+6.8
Conservative	Jane Kelly‡	578	33.9	−3.2
Conservative	Sarah Choudhury	457	26.8	−6.1
Liberal Democrats	Paul Radcliffe	243	24.8	+7.2
Green	Nick Tidiman	327	19.2	−9.6
Liberal Democrats	Ian Whitham	188	11.0	N/A
Independent	Philip Stanley-Watts	177	10.4	−22.5
Majority				
Turnout		1,703	21.67	−1.8%
Rejected ballots		13		
Labour gain from Conservative		Swing		
Labour hold		Swing		

=== Bournemouth Central ===
Bournemouth Central
Party	Candidate	Votes	%	±%
Conservative	Hazel Allen‡	663	32.9	−6.9
Labour	Jamie Martin	640	31.8	+15.4
Conservative	Ed Down	534	26.5	−15.0
Independent	David Smith	488	24.2	−5.2
Labour	Ian Prankerd	450	22.3	+8.7
Green	Jon Crewe	352	17.5	−3.8
Liberal Democrats	David England	255	12.7	+2.8
Independent	Alan Zaczek	198	9.8	N/A
Liberal Democrats	Martin Rodger	179	8.9	+0.9
Majority				
Turnout		2,014	21.99	−3.69
Rejected ballots		14		
Conservative hold		Swing		
Labour gain from Conservative		Swing		

=== Broadstone ===
Broadstone
Party	Candidate	Votes	%	±%
Liberal Democrats	Vikki Slade‡	2,564	69.2	+2.0
Liberal Democrats	Peter Sidaway	2,307	62.2	−4.8
Conservative	David Newell	912	24.6	+0.6
Conservative	John Bill	909	24.5	+4.2
Green	Soo Chapman	218	5.9	N/A
Labour	Robin Phillips	171	4.6	+1.4
Majority				
Turnout		3,707	43.28	−6.39
Rejected ballots		21		
Liberal Democrats hold		Swing		
Liberal Democrats hold		Swing		

=== Burton and Grange ===
Burton and Grange
Party	Candidate	Votes	%	±%
CI	Simon McCormack‡	727	40.6	−4.5
CI	David Flagg‡	652	36.4	−14.8
Conservative	Michael Adams	445	24.8	+9.3
Conservative	Samuel Joynson	385	21.5	+6.2
Liberal Democrats	Robert Dawson	365	20.4	+14.1
Liberal Democrats	Alinda Howland	304	17.0	+11.6
Labour	Simon Dawson	228	12.7	−9.8
Green	Graham Kendrick	155	8.7	+0.7
Green	Deb Sutton	134	7.5	N/A
Majority				
Turnout		1,791	25.42	−8.04
Rejected ballots		4		
CI hold		Swing		
CI hold		Swing		

=== Canford Cliffs ===
Canford Cliffs
Party	Candidate	Votes	%	±%
Conservative	May Haines‡	1,711	56.4	−5.5
Conservative	John Challinor	1,680	55.4	−2.2
Liberal Democrats	Ray Sparrow	620	20.4	+3.1
Liberal Democrats	Rich Douglas	513	16.9	+5.3
Labour	Jim Buchanan	291	9.6	+3.8
Green	Johnny Tutton	267	8.8	N/A
Poole Engage	Sheridan Burnett	261	8.6	N/A
Poole Engage	Sharala Lowe	235	7.7	N/A
Independent	Peter Pawlowski	161	5.3	−13.8
Majority				
Turnout		3,034	37.99	−2.59
Rejected ballots		8		
Conservative hold		Swing		
Conservative hold		Swing		

=== Canford Heath ===
Canford Heath
Party	Candidate	Votes	%	±%
Liberal Democrats	Sandra Moore‡	2,199	65.7	+9.4
Liberal Democrats	Chris Matthews‡	1,953	58.4	+8.2
Liberal Democrats	Clare Weight	1,575	47.1	+2.9
Conservative	Sean Gabriel‡ (Note: Elected in a by-election in May 2021)	1,124	33.6	+7.8
Conservative	Helen Lawrence	828	24.8	−0.2
Conservative	Manoj Pillai	811	24.2	+5.4
Labour	Janet Green	388	11.6	+0.2
Green	Pamela Jefferies	296	8.8	−0.8
Majority				
Turnout		3,345	31.34	−1.17
Rejected ballots		12		
Liberal Democrats hold		Swing		
Liberal Democrats hold		Swing		
Liberal Democrats hold		Swing		

=== Christchurch Town ===
Christchurch Town
Party	Candidate	Votes	%	±%
Liberal Democrats	Mike Cox‡	1,619	53.8	+24.2
Liberal Democrats	Michael Tarling	1,456	48.4	+20.2
CI	Avril Coulton	778	25.8	+3.6
CI	Viv Charrett	695	23.1	+2.4
Conservative	John Trickett	372	12.4	−15.8
Conservative	Luc Swarbrick	362	12.0	−11.8
Labour	Julian Spurr	208	6.9	−4.6
Green	Sam Cato	183	6.1	−6.7
Green	Steven Thomas	117	3.9	N/A
Majority				
Turnout		3,010	37.24	−0.96
Rejected ballots		5		
Liberal Democrats hold		Swing		
Liberal Democrats gain from Conservative		Swing		

=== Commons ===
Commons
Party	Candidate	Votes	%	±%
CI	Margaret Phipps‡	1,757	59.5	+9.4
CI	Vanessa Ricketts‡ (Note: Elected in a by-election in May 2021)	1,574	53.3	+1.4
Conservative	Tara Fox	414	14.0	±0.0
Liberal Democrats	Mark Davies	380	12.9	−1.8
Independent	Robin Adamson	355	12.0	N/A
Green	Carol Gardiner	310	10.5	N/A
Labour	Peter Stokes	294	9.9	+2.8
Liberal Democrats	Cat Gold	226	7.6	−5.0
Conservative	Lynda Price	226	7.6	−5.3
Majority				
Turnout		2,955	37.13	−3.4
Rejected ballots		7		
CI hold		Swing		
CI hold		Swing		

=== Creekmoor ===
Creekmoor
Party	Candidate	Votes	%	±%
Poole Engage	Judes Butt‡ (Note: Elected as Conservative, formed Poole Engage in June 2022)	960	44.8	+6.0
Liberal Democrats	Paul Slade	774	36.1	+13.1
Liberal Democrats	Paige Stevens	650	30.3	+10.6
Poole Engage	Sarah Hollis	645	30.1	N/A
Conservative	Bob Lister	320	14.9	−23.9
Conservative	Tony Reeves	299	13.9	−11.9
Labour	Neil John Duncan-Jordan	281	13.1	+3.8
Green	Diana Tozer	161	7.5	−5.2
Majority				
Turnout		2,145	29.52	−1.74
Rejected ballots		6		
Poole Engage gain from Conservative		Swing		
Liberal Democrats gain from UKIP		Swing		

=== East Cliff and Springbourne ===
East Cliff and Springbourne
Party	Candidate	Votes	%	±%
Labour	Martin Bedford	965	35.2	+9.7
Labour	Anne-Marie Moriarty	881	32.1	+7.5
Conservative	Anne Filer‡	842	30.7	−5.5
Green	Sara Armstrong	830	30.2	+7.4
Conservative	David Kelsey‡	797	29.0	−5.6
Conservative	Roberto Rocca‡	772	28.1	−2.6
Labour	Declan Stones	757	27.6	+4.0
Green	Paul Gray	666	24.3	N/A
Green	Louise Kenchington	658	24.0	N/A
Liberal Democrats	Ash Santini	239	8.7	−8.7
Liberal Democrats	Frank Hollowell	238	8.7	−7.4
Liberal Democrats	Dwaid Coleman	214	7.8	−8.1
Majority				
Turnout		2,745	23.99	−0.03
Rejected ballots		16		
Labour gain from Conservative		Swing		
Labour gain from Conservative		Swing		
Conservative hold		Swing		

=== East Southbourne and Tuckton ===
East Southbourne and Tuckton
Party	Candidate	Votes	%	±%
Liberal Democrats	Bernadette Nanovo	1,660	52.6	+32.3
Liberal Democrats	Judy Richardson	1,642	52.1	+40.8
Conservative	Eddie Coope‡	984	31.2	−25.3
Conservative	Malcolm Davies‡	865	27.4	−22.5
Green	Jane Bull	334	10.6	−11.8
Labour	Alan Davidson	296	9.4	+1.1
Labour	Jan Youngs	248	7.9	−4.2
Majority				
Turnout		3,153	42.66	+4.02
Rejected ballots		15		
Liberal Democrats gain from Conservative		Swing		
Liberal Democrats gain from Conservative		Swing		

=== Hamworthy ===
Hamworthy
Party	Candidate	Votes	%	±%
Poole People	Brian Hitchcock	849	33.5	−18.1
Poole Engage	Julie Bagwell‡ (Note: Elected as Poole People, formed Poole Engage in June 2022)	759	30.0	−21.6
Labour	Peter Cooper	720	28.4	+14.0
Conservative	Mike White‡	656	25.9	+1.3
Poole Engage	Daniel Butt‡ (Note: Elected as Poole People, formed Poole Engage in June 2022)	630	24.9	−20.0
Conservative	Mike Wilkins	593	23.4	+0.3
Liberal Democrats	Steve Robinson	492	19.4	+12.3
Conservative	Janet Walton	478	18.9	−0.4
Poole Engage	Mohan Iyengar (Note: Incumbent councillor for Canford Cliffs; elected as Conservative, formed Poole Engage in June 2022)	463	18.3	N/A
Liberal Democrats	Jude Chapman	385	15.2	+9.0
Green	Yasmine Osbourne	367	14.5	−0.1
Liberal Democrats	David Chapman	333	13.1	+7.9
Majority				
Turnout		2,534	24.25	−6.18
Rejected ballots		15		
Poole People hold		Swing		
Poole Engage gain from Poole People		Swing		
Labour gain from Conservative		Swing		

=== Highcliffe and Walkford ===
Highcliffe and Walkford
Party	Candidate	Votes	%	±%
CI	Andy Martin‡ (Note: Elected in a by-election in October 2022)	2,810	73.8	+25.7
CI	David Martin	2,450	64.3	+20.9
Conservative	Mike Ellis	354	9.3	−22.7
Independent	Nigel Brooks‡	324	8.5	−39.6
Liberal Democrats	Robin Ede	317	8.3	−1.9
Labour	Lorraine Brown	260	6.8	−1.2
Green	Helen Woodall	220	5.8	N/A
Conservative	Efe Ohwofasa	208	5.5	−21.8
Reform	Vince Cable	189	5.0	N/A
Liberal Democrats	Keith Harrison	168	4.4	−5.0
Communist	Carol Wilcox	40	1.0	N/A
Majority				
Turnout		3,810	44.05	−0.17
Rejected ballots		1		
CI hold		Swing		
CI hold		Swing		

=== Kinson ===
Kinson
Party	Candidate	Votes	%	±%
Conservative	Cameron Adams	1,092	36.7	+9.4
Conservative	Duane Farr‡	1,063	35.7	+4.0
Labour Co-op	Michelle Dower	1,062	35.7	+12.1
Labour Co-op	Paul Williams	1,029	34.6	+11.6
Conservative	Laurence Fear‡	964	32.4	+2.7
Labour Co-op	Zach Griffiths	958	32.2	+10.3
Liberal Democrats	Neil Atkinson	579	19.4	+11.5
Liberal Democrats	Claire Smith	560	18.8	+11.2
Liberal Democrats	Richard Smith	473	15.9	N/A
Green	Jemima Astill	339	11.4	−3.3
Independent	Sue Lennon	277	9.3	+2.8
Majority				
Rejected ballots		9	0.1	
Turnout		2,978	23.21	−3.33
Conservative hold		Swing		
Conservative hold		Swing		
Labour Co-op gain from Conservative		Swing		

=== Littledown and Iford ===
Littledown and Iford
Party	Candidate	Votes	%	±%
Conservative	Lawrence Williams‡	940	39.3	−8.7
Conservative	Bobbie Dove	892	37.3	−9.7
Liberal Democrats	Catherine Bishop	802	33.6	+11.0
Liberal Democrats	Chris Mayne	572	23.9	+11.2
Labour	Toni Colledge	470	19.7	+4.6
Labour	Patrick Connolly	448	18.8	+5.5
Green	David Ball	428	17.9	−4.5
Majority				
Turnout		2,389	31.89	−0.87
Rejected ballots		14		
Conservative hold		Swing		
Conservative hold		Swing		

=== Moordown ===
Moordown
Party	Candidate	Votes	%	±%
Green	Alice Salmon	1,089	47.3	+21.1
Green	Joe Salmon	904	39.3	+16.3
Conservative	Sarah Anderson‡	637	27.7	−12.3
Conservative	Beverley Dunlop‡	582	25.3	−2.9
Labour	Mary Apperley	528	22.9	+3.5
Labour	David Stokes	447	19.4	+1.9
Liberal Democrats	Andrew Hallam	204	8.9	N/A
Majority				
Turnout		2,303	31.71	
Rejected ballots		16		
Green gain from Conservative		Swing		
Green gain from Conservative		Swing		

=== Mudeford, Stanpit and West Highcliffe ===
Mudeford, Stanpit and West Highcliffe
Party	Candidate	Votes	%	±%
CI	Lesley Dedman‡	2,004	62.4	+11.9
CI	Paul Hilliard‡	1,784	55.5	+7.9
Conservative	Claire Bath	923	28.7	−3.6
Liberal Democrats	Sam Davies	320	10.0	−0.4
Liberal Democrats	Erin Tarling	305	9.5	+0.3
Green	Adie Saunders	294	9.2	N/A
Labour	Ian Wands	245	7.6	+0.9
Majority				
Turnout		3,213	39.30	−5.65
Rejected ballots		4		
CI hold		Swing		
CI hold		Swing		

=== Muscliff and Strouden Park ===
Muscliff and Strouden Park
Party	Candidate	Votes	%	±%
Independent	Kieron Wilson‡	1,595	44.8	−6.7
Independent	Lisa Northover‡	1,227	34.4	−3.9
Independent	Brian Castle	1,058	29.7	N/A
Conservative	Ian Clark	894	25.1	+1.6
Independent	Liz Lucas	879	24.7	N/A
Conservative	Derek Borthwick‡	870	24.4	−0.3
Conservative	Kierran Paxton	817	22.9	+2.6
Labour	Farah Bassinder	724	20.3	+7.5
Labour	Robert Bassinder	703	19.7	+9.4
Labour	Johny M Skaria	640	18.0	+8.1
Liberal Democrats	Olivia Sidaway	195	5.5	N/A
Liberal Democrats	Brian Palmer	188	5.3	N/A
Liberal Democrats	Martin Sheppard	157	4.4	N/A
Majority				
Turnout		3,562	28.41	
Rejected ballots		12		
Independent hold		Swing		
Independent hold		Swing		
Independent gain from Conservative		Swing		

=== Newtown and Heatherlands ===
Newtown and Heatherlands
Party	Candidate	Votes	%	±%
Liberal Democrats	Millie Clementine Earl‡	1,966	62.5	+16.8
Liberal Democrats	Marion Le Poidevin‡	1,717	54.6	+12.7
Liberal Democrats	Sandra Mackrow	1,609	51.1	+15.6
Labour	Emma Lang	706	22.4	+4.3
Conservative	Malcolm Farrell	695	22.1	±0.0
Green	Bruce Tomalin	636	20.2	−1.2
Conservative	Sylvia Saxon	600	19.1	+0.3
Conservative	Louise Russell	561	17.8	+1.5
Majority				
Turnout		3,147	24.15	−5.76
Rejected ballots		18		
Liberal Democrats hold		Swing		
Liberal Democrats hold		Swing		
Liberal Democrats hold		Swing		

=== Oakdale ===
Oakdale
Party	Candidate	Votes	%	±%
Poole People	Felicity Rice‡ (Note: Elected as Alliance for Local Living)	987	40.6	+0.2
Poole People	Peter Miles‡	914	37.6	−13.2
Poole Engage	Steve Hayes	460	18.9	N/A
Conservative	Sunil Kumar	446	18.4	−6.9
Conservative	Simon Hollosi	435	17.9	−1.1
Labour	Alan Daniels	415	17.1	+6.5
Poole Engage	Marie Pethen	363	14.9	N/A
Liberal Democrats	Molly Slade	323	13.3	+1.2
Liberal Democrats	David Brandwood	309	12.7	+1.1
Majority				
Turnout		2,430	29.08	
Rejected ballots		9		
Poole People hold		Swing		
Poole People gain from ALL		Swing		

=== Parkstone ===
Parkstone
Party	Candidate	Votes	%	±%
Liberal Democrats	Crispin Goodall	1,284	44.1	+23.5
Liberal Democrats	Emily Harman	1,269	43.6	+29.4
Conservative	Bryan Dion (Note: Incumbent councillor for Penn Hill)	652	22.4	−9.1
Conservative	Ashley Fraser	628	21.6	−5.7
Poole People	Susan Stockwell	349	12.0	−31.5
Poole People	Matilda Northover	337	11.6	N/A
Labour	Darren Taylor	332	11.4	−2.2
Green	Ben Pantling	287	9.9	−6.4
Poole Engage	Steve Baron‡ (Note: Elected as Poole People, formed Poole Engage in June 2022)	278	9.6	−33.9
Poole Engage	Elaine Atkinson	250	8.6	N/A
Majority				
Turnout		2,910	34.53	−2.26
Rejected ballots		10		
Liberal Democrats gain from Poole People		Swing		
Liberal Democrats gain from Conservative		Swing		

=== Penn Hill ===
Penn Hill
Party	Candidate	Votes	%	±%
Liberal Democrats	Jo Clements	1,445	48.5	+13.7
Liberal Democrats	Oliver Walters	1,196	40.2	+8.7
Conservative	Remy Aquilina	851	28.6	−6.6
Conservative	Tony O’Neill‡	735	24.7	−14.9
Poole Engage	Sophie-Julienne Burnett	413	13.9	N/A
Labour	Jake Ruggier	382	12.8	−2.8
Poole Engage	Nathelie Tudberry	353	11.9	N/A
Green	Helen Nicol	294	9.9	−16.3
Majority		2,978	34.24	−0.62
Turnout			34.24	
Rejected ballots		8		
Liberal Democrats gain from Conservative		Swing		
Liberal Democrats gain from Conservative		Swing		

=== Poole Town ===
Poole Town
Party	Candidate	Votes	%	±%
Poole People	Andy Hadley‡	933	33.0	−14.6
Poole People	Mark Howell‡	925	32.7	−15.2
Labour	Sue Aitkenhead	841	29.7	+7.4
Conservative	Gavin Wright	709	25.0	+5.1
Conservative	Leanne Barnes	705	24.9	+5.6
Poole People	Charmaine Parkinson	701	24.8	−21.5
Conservative	Sarah O’Connell	672	23.7	+4.8
Green	Leo Butterworth	419	14.8	N/A
Liberal Democrats	Katharine Palfrey	406	14.3	+4.5
Poole Engage	Christopher Bulteel	335	11.8	N/A
Poole Engage	Dave Butt	310	11.0	N/A
Liberal Democrats	Mark Robson	309	10.9	+3.3
Liberal Democrats	Abbi Slade	304	10.7	+4.4
Poole Engage	Ian Davies	251	8.9	N/A
Majority				
Turnout		2,831	28.44	−4.97
Rejected ballots		10		
Poole People hold		Swing		
Poole People hold		Swing		
Labour gain from Poole People		Swing		

=== Queen's Park ===
Queen's Park
Party	Candidate	Votes	%	±%
Green	Alasdair Keddie	809	33.0	+13.1
Labour	Sharon Carr-Brown	808	32.9	+16.3
Conservative	Mark Anderson‡	759	30.9	−14.2
Green	Nicole Nagel	746	30.4	+15.1
Conservative	Cheryl Johnson‡	693	28.2	−10.6
Labour	Christopher Talman	594	24.2	+9.6
Liberal Democrats	Lorraine Crouch	215	8.8	−2.2
Liberal Democrats	Gillian Pardy	170	6.9	−4.5
Majority				
Turnout		2,455	31.69	
Rejected ballots		20		
Green gain from Conservative		Swing		
Labour gain from Conservative		Swing		

=== Redhill and Northbourne ===
Redhill and Northbourne
Party	Candidate	Votes	%	±%
Independent	Stephen Bartlett‡	844	38.9	−10.3
Independent	Jackie Edwards‡ (Note: Elected as Conservative)	751	34.6	+9.2
Conservative	Karen Hay	551	25.4	±0.0
Conservative	Daniel Wilson	503	23.2	−1.4
Labour	Ruth Messer	419	19.3	+8.1
Labour	Ann Williams	387	17.8	+9.7
Liberal Democrats	Heather Dalziel	273	12.6	+3.3
Green	Carwyn Davies	246	11.3	+0.5
Liberal Democrats	Ines Antunovic Thomson	193	8.9	+2.9
Majority				
Turnout		2,170	28.71	−5.68
Rejected ballots		9		
Independent hold		Swing		
Independent gain from Conservative		Swing		

=== Talbot and Branksome Woods ===
Talbot and Branksome Woods
Party	Candidate	Votes	%	±%
Liberal Democrats	Matthew Gillett	1,143	39.1	+21.7
Conservative	Karen Rampton‡	1,073	36.7	−6.7
Conservative	Philip Broadhead‡	1,068	36.6	−8.1
Liberal Democrats	Mark Battistini	1,063	36.4	+18.8
Conservative	Jane Newell	1,024	35.1	−9.4
Liberal Democrats	Daniel Parkin	985	33.7	+16.7
Green	Ian Cunliffe	413	14.1	−6.6
Labour	Paul Forsdick	391	13.4	−0.6
Labour	Elaine Yiannaki	372	12.7	−1.0
Labour	Stephen Stones	313	10.7	−2.9
Heritage	Jim Burch	181	6.2	N/A
No Description	Charlotte Robinson	112	3.8	N/A
Majority				
Turnout		2,920	29.34	−2.16
Rejected ballots		13		
Liberal Democrats gain from Conservative		Swing		
Conservative hold		Swing		
Conservative hold		Swing		

=== Wallisdown and Winton West ===
Wallisdown and Winton West
Party	Candidate	Votes	%	±%
Liberal Democrats	Olivia Brown	1,108	53.1	+36.0
Liberal Democrats	Richard Herrett	951	45.6	+32.0
Conservative	Nigel Hedges‡	477	22.9	−19.5
Conservative	Toby Johnson (Note: Incumbent councillor for Alderney & Bourne Valley; elected as Liberal Democrat)	416	20.0	−20.4
Labour	Julia Drage	352	16.9	+0.7
Green	Matthew Burgess	318	15.3	−5.5
Labour	Michael Cracknell	303	14.5	−2.9
Majority				
Turnout		2,085	28.79	
Rejected ballots		4		
Liberal Democrats gain from Conservative		Swing		
Liberal Democrats gain from Conservative		Swing		

=== West Southbourne ===
West Southbourne
Party	Candidate	Votes	%	±%
Liberal Democrats	Brian Chick	1,250	44.1	+17.6
Liberal Democrats	Jeff Hanna	1,209	42.6	+16.4
Labour	Simon Adorian	964	34.0	+6.6
Labour	Joanne Oldale	913	32.2	+5.7
Conservative	Bob Lawton‡	461	16.2	−10.8
Conservative	Ray Hatchard	458	16.1	−9.7
Green	Susan Graham	246	8.7	N/A
Majority				
Turnout		2,837	37.94	+4.67
Rejected ballots		15		
Liberal Democrats gain from Labour		Swing		
Liberal Democrats gain from Conservative		Swing		

=== Westbourne and West Cliff ===
Westbourne and West Cliff
Party	Candidate	Votes	%	±%
Conservative	John Beesley‡	974	41.3	−6.8
Conservative	David D’Orton Gibson	887	37.6	−9.0
Liberal Democrats	Russell Trent	718	30.4	+7.5
Liberal Democrats	Allan Turner Ward	625	26.5	+10.1
Labour	Jill Grower	472	20.0	+4.2
Green	Liz Elwick	448	19.0	−2.2
Labour	Daniel Moore	351	14.9	+4.0
Rejected ballots		18		
Majority				
Turnout		2,359	28.72	
Conservative hold		Swing		
Conservative hold		Swing		

=== Winton East ===
Winton East
Party	Candidate	Votes	%	±%
Green	Simon Bull‡	1,183	66.7	+3.1
Green	Chris Rigby ‡	1,116	62.9	+7.9
Conservative	Terry Ali	278	15.7	−5.8
Labour	Austin McCormack	262	14.8	−0.7
Conservative	Sash Jolliffe	246	13.9	−4.6
Labour	Mike Ramsdale	241	13.6	−1.5
Liberal Democrats	Paul Dredge	100	5.6	N/A
Rejected ballots		16	0.9	
Majority				
Turnout		1,774	24.74	
Green hold		Swing		
Green hold		Swing		

== Changes 2023–2027 ==
- Michelle Dower (Kinson) and Gillian Martin (Boscombe West), both elected as Labour councillors, left the Labour group to sit as independents in summer 2025.
- Karen Rampton (Talbot and Branksome Woods), elected as a Conservative, left the Conservative group by May 2025.
- Cameron Adams and Duane Farr (both Kinson), elected as Conservatives, joined Reform UK on 7 October 2025, becoming the party's first councillors on the council.
- Rachel Pattinson-West (Alderney and Bourne Valley), elected as a Liberal Democrat, joined the Green Party in early 2026.
- Gillian Martin (Boscombe West) joined Reform UK, announced at the full council meeting on 24 March 2026.

=== By-elections ===
==== East Cliff and Springbourne ====
Five days after the election, newly elected Labour councillor Martin Bedford for East Cliff and Springbourne resigned due to ill health.

East Cliff and Springbourne: 29 June 2023
Party	Candidate	Votes	%	±%
Green	Sara Armstrong	817	38.4	+9.5
Conservative	David Kelsey	614	28.8	–0.5
Labour	Declan Stones	590	27.7	–5.9
Liberal Democrats	Paul Radcliffe	108	5.1	–3.2
Majority		203	9.6	N/A
Turnout		2,140	18.68	−5.29
Rejected ballots		11	0.5	
Green gain from Labour		Swing		

==== Canford Cliffs ====
A by-election was held on 2 May 2024 after Conservative councillor May Haines resigned.

Canford Cliffs: 2 May 2024
Party	Candidate	Votes	%	±%
Conservative	Gavin Wright	1,720	62.0	+5.6
Liberal Democrats	Ray Sparrow	573	20.7	+0.3
Labour	Jim Buchanan	317	11.4	+1.8
Green	Johnny Tutton	163	5.9	−2.9
Majority		1,147	41.3	
Turnout		2,804	35.4	−2.59
Rejected ballots		31	1.1	
Registered electors		7,918		
Conservative hold		Swing		

==== Muscliff and Strouden Park ====
A by-election was held on 24 October 2024 after the death of independent councillor Brian Castle.

Muscliff and Strouden Park by-election: 24 October 2024
Party	Candidate	Votes	%	±%
Conservative	Toby Slade	1,008	43.4	+17.2
Labour	Eyyup Kilinc	434	18.7	–2.5
Independent	Julie-Anne Houldey	406	17.5	N/A
Liberal Democrats	Richard Blackwell-Whitehead	174	7.5	+1.8
Independent	Peter Rogers	118	5.1	N/A
Independent	Conor O'Luby	100	4.3	N/A
Green	Roger Mann	84	3.6	N/A
Majority		574	24.7	N/A
Turnout		2,336	18.4	–10.0
Rejected ballots		12	0.5	
Registered electors		12,693		
Conservative gain from Independent		Swing	▲9.9	

==== Talbot and Branksome Woods ====
A by-election was held on 11 September 2025 after Conservative councillor Philip Broadhead, the former council leader, stepped down as his family relocated abroad.

Talbot and Branksome Woods by-election: 11 September 2025
Party	Candidate	Votes	%	±%
Liberal Democrats	Dawn Logan	910	32.4	–2.1
Reform	Martin Houlden	791	28.2	N/A
Conservative	Jo Keeling	770	27.4	–5.0
Labour	Charlie Cushway	170	6.1	–5.7
Green	Amy Hardy	165	5.9	–6.6
Majority		119	4.2	N/A
Turnout		2,808	28.4	–0.9
Rejected ballots		3	0.1	
Registered electors		9,900		
Liberal Democrats gain from Conservative				

==== Penn Hill ====
A by-election was held on 5 November 2026 after the resignation of Liberal Democrat councillor Jo Clements.

Penn Hill by-election: 5 November 2026
Party	Candidate	Votes	%	±%
Liberal Democrats	Amanda Jellicoe	1,278	43.6	+0.9
Conservative	Ashley Fraser	764	26.1	+1.0
Reform	Xena Dion	521	17.8	New
Labour	Ralph Lynch	135	4.6	−6.7
Restore	Max Walker	106	3.6	New
Green	Ace Cruz	65	2.2	−6.5
Independent	Susan Stockwell	55	1.9	New
Independent	Louise Fielden	7	0.2	New
Majority		514	17.5	
Rejected ballots		6	0.2	
Turnout		2,937	33.8	–0.4
Registered electors		8,686		
Liberal Democrats hold		Swing	~▼0.1	
