= Sea View, Dorset =

Suburb of Poole, Dorset, England

Coordinates: 50.731149°N 1.95327°W

Sea View
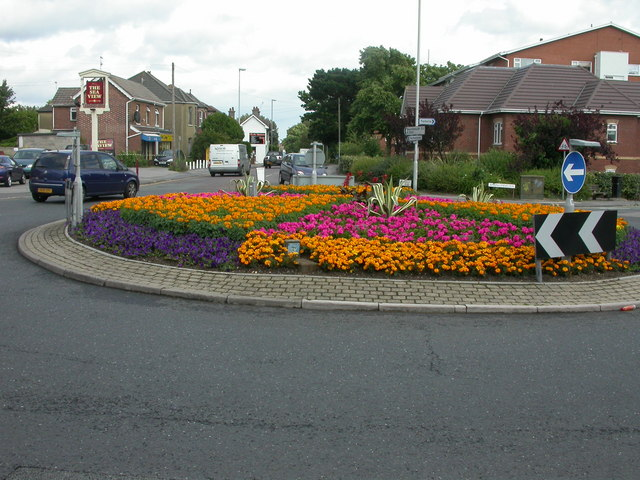
- Sea View roundabout in 2009

- Location within Dorset
- Unitary authority: Bournemouth, Christchurch and Poole
- Ceremonial county: Dorset
- Region: South West
- Country: England
- Sovereign state: United Kingdom
- Post town: POOLE
- Postcode district: BH13
- Dialling code: 01202
- Police: Dorset
- Fire: Dorset and Wiltshire
- Ambulance: South Western
- UK Parliament: Poole

Sea View is a suburb of Poole, Dorset. The area is anchored by Sea View Road, which links Parkstone towards Canford Cliffs and Sandbanks.

== History ==
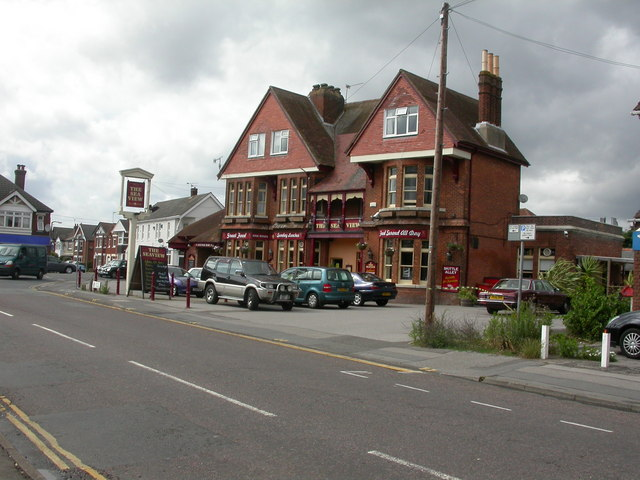
The former Sea View public house was built in 1861. It was demolished in 2020.

The Victorian Sea View pub was demolished and replaced with a Co-op in 2020.

== Geography ==
The area is known for the Sea View viewpoint. Despite the name, the sea cannot be seen from there.

== Politics ==
Sea View is part of the Poole parliamentary constituency.
