= Vikki Slade =

British politician (born 1972)

Vikki Slade MP
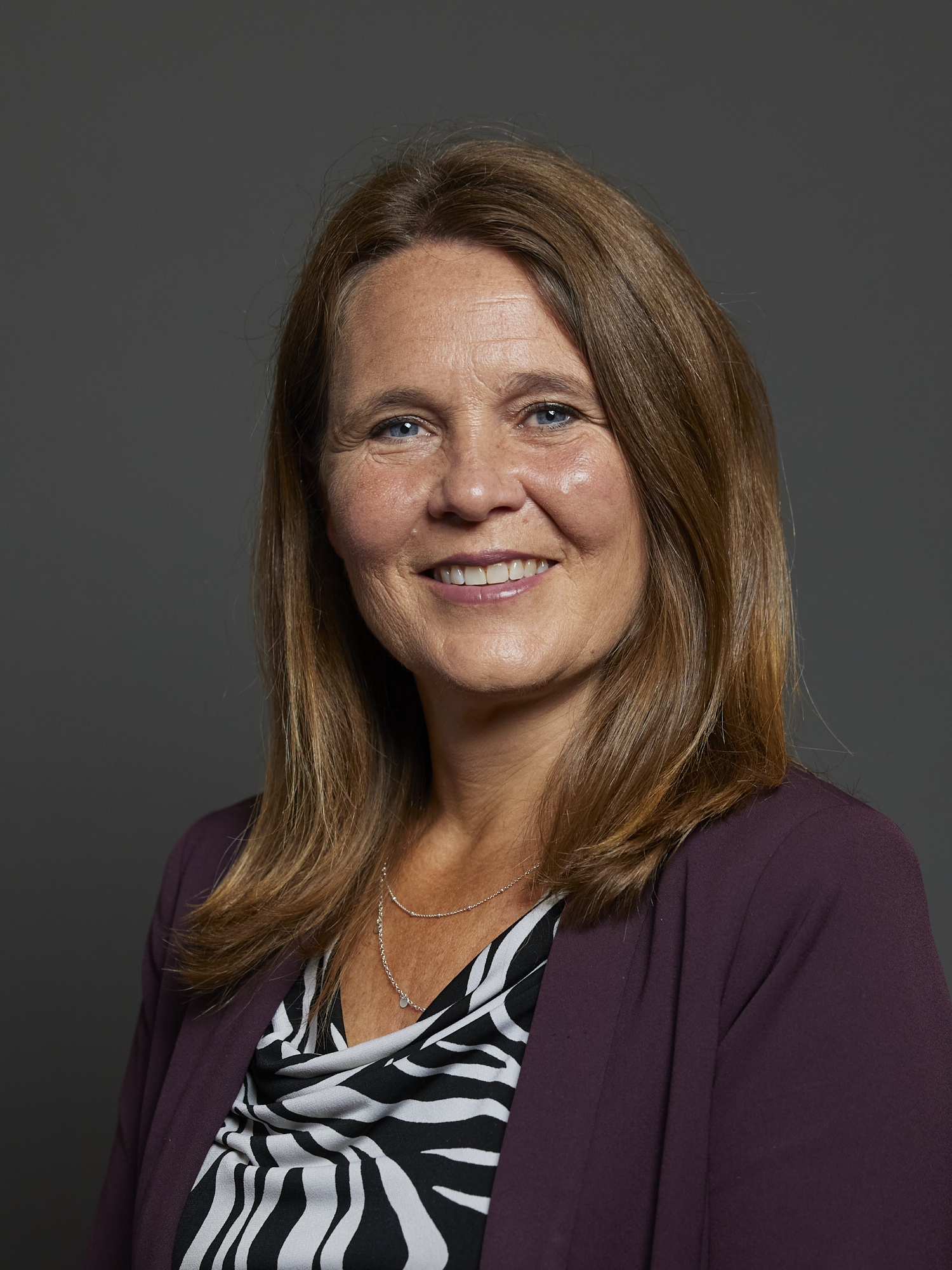
- Official portrait, 2024

Member of Parliament for Mid Dorset and North Poole
- Incumbent
- Assumed office 4 July 2024
- Preceded by: Michael Tomlinson
- Majority: 1,352 (2.7%)

Liberal Democrat Spokesperson for Housing, Communities and Local Government
- In office 18 September 2024 – 30 September 2025
- Leader: Ed Davey
- Preceded by: Helen Morgan
- Succeeded by: Gideon Amos (Housing and Communities); Zöe Franklin (Local Government)

Leader of Bournemouth, Christchurch and Poole Council
- In office 23 May 2023 – 14 July 2024
- Preceded by: Philip Broadhead
- Succeeded by: Millie Earl
- In office 21 May 2019 – 15 September 2020
- Preceded by: Council established
- Succeeded by: Drew Mellor

Personal details
- Born: 17 December 1972 (age 53)
- Party: Liberal Democrats
- Website: www.vikkislade.uk

Vikki Slade (born 17 December 1972) is a British Liberal Democrat politician who has served as the Member of Parliament for Mid Dorset and North Poole since the 2024 general election. She unsuccessfully contested the same seat in 2015, 2017 and 2019.

== Early life ==
Slade was educated at Edenbridge Middle School from 1982 to 1984, then at Tonbridge Grammar School from 1984 to 1990 and at Crawley College of Further Education thereafter. Initially working in financial services and management, since 2005, she then worked in a local catering business and cafe family business, where she mentored disadvantaged young people and offered apprenticeships and work placements. She has also volunteered as employability mentor at a number of secondary schools with Young Enterprise.

== Political career ==
She has represented Broadstone as a local councillor since 2011, including when the ward was part of Poole Borough Council prior to 2019.

In the 2015 general election, her campaign to succeed Annette Brooke was supported by Lord Oakeshott, coming second to Michael Tomlinson. She contested the seat again in 2017 and 2019, albeit coming second to Tomlinson each time.

Slade was the leader of Bournemouth, Christchurch and Poole Council from 2023 until her resignation in July 2024. She previously served as leader from the 2019 election to September 2020. She was head of the "Three Towns Alliance" coalition.

In the 2024 general election, she unseated Conservative Michael Tomlinson, who had been the Minister of State for Countering Illegal Migration. After being elected she said she wouldn't have stood for a fifth time had she lost.

Slade was a member of the frontbench Team of Ed Davey as the party's Housing, Communities and Local Government spokesperson, shadowing Angela Rayner and Steve Reed, before departing the frontbench in a reshuffle and being replaced as Housing spokesperson by Gideon Amos and Local Government spokesperson by Zöe Franklin, following the Liberal Democrat Conference in Bournemouth in September 2025.

In her first year in parliament, Slade has worked on issues such as the closure of Wareham Crossing and shoplifting in Wimborne. She has frequently worked on issues such as devolution, defence and education, and she opposed the government's cut to the Winter Fuel Payment, calling it "completely wrong".

In November 2024, Slade voted in favour of the Terminally Ill Adults (End of Life) Bill, which proposes to legalise assisted suicide. In June 2025, she continued to vote in favour of the bill's third reading.

In November 2025, she replaced Josh Babarinde on the Justice Select Committee.

Slade has campaigned extensively on Education and SEND. In 2026, she has spoken in Parliament about the challenges of self-employed disabled young people, and raised awareness of the work SAMEE does. She has met Andrew Western, Parliamentary Under-Secretary for Transformations at the Department for Work and Pensions to discuss this topic.

Slade is chair of the APPG on Town Centre and vice chair of the APPG on the National Trust, Parks and Green Spaces, Performing Arts and Education and Training and Play.

== Personal life ==
Slade is married to Paul Slade, who is a councillor for Creekmoor ward, and they have four children. They have fostered children, including unaccompanied asylum seekers, and have hosted a refugee from the War in Ukraine.

In 2012, she founded Broadstone Fields, which created the Annual Summer Fun Day. In 2022, she founded and chairs Broadstone Youth Centre, where she volunteers as the youth leader at its Youth Club. She has been part of a number of community groups in Broadstone, including the local Chamber of Trade which campaigned for small businesses and ran the town's community events.

== Electoral history ==
Date of election	Seat	Party	Votes	%	Result
2011 Poole Borough Council election	Broadstone	Liberal Democrat	2,016	N/A	Elected (3rd)
2015 United Kingdom general election	Mid Dorset and North Poole	Liberal Democrat	13,109	28.2	Not elected (2nd)
2016 Broadstone By-election (Poole Borough Council)	Broadstone	Liberal Democrat	2,184	69.56	Elected
2017 United Kingdom general election	Mid Dorset and North Poole	Liberal Democrat	13,246	27.5	Not elected (2nd)
2019 Bournemouth, Christchurch and Poole Council election	Broadstone	Liberal Democrat	2,899	67.2	Elected (1st)
2019 United Kingdom general election	Mid Dorset and North Poole	Liberal Democrat	14,650	29.9	Not elected (2nd)
2023 Bournemouth, Christchurch and Poole Council election	Broadstone	Liberal Democrat	2,564	69.2	Elected (1st)
2024 United Kingdom general election	Mid Dorset and North Poole	Liberal Democrat	21,442	43.3	Elected
