= BH postcode area =

Postcode area within the United Kingdom

Bournemouth
- Postcode area
- Coordinates: 50.750°N 1.892°W
- Country: United Kingdom
- Postcode area: BH
- Postcode area name: Bournemouth
- Post towns: 11
- Postcode districts: 26
- Postcode sectors: 103
- Postcodes (live): 15,163
- Postcodes (total): 22,188
- Statistics as at May 2020

The BH postcode area, also known as the Bournemouth postcode area, is a group of 26 postcode districts in southern England, within eleven post towns. These cover east Dorset (including Bournemouth, Poole, Broadstone, Christchurch, Ferndown, Swanage, Verwood, Wareham and Wimborne) and part of south-west Hampshire (including New Milton and Ringwood).

== Coverage ==
The approximate coverage of the postcode districts:

Postcode district	Post town	Coverage	Local authority area(s)
BH1	BOURNEMOUTH	Bournemouth Town Centre, East Cliff, Springbourne, Boscombe town centre	Bournemouth, Christchurch and Poole
BH2	BOURNEMOUTH	Bournemouth Town Centre, West Cliff	Bournemouth, Christchurch and Poole
BH3	BOURNEMOUTH	Talbot Woods, Winton south	Bournemouth, Christchurch and Poole
BH4	BOURNEMOUTH	Westbourne, Branksome Woods	Bournemouth, Christchurch and Poole
BH5	BOURNEMOUTH	Boscombe, Pokesdown	Bournemouth, Christchurch and Poole
BH6	BOURNEMOUTH	Southbourne, Tuckton, Wick	Bournemouth, Christchurch and Poole
BH7	BOURNEMOUTH	Littledown, Iford	Bournemouth, Christchurch and Poole
BH8	BOURNEMOUTH	Bournemouth railway station, Malmesbury Park, Richmond Park, Queens Park, Charminster, Strouden Park, Townsend, Holdenhurst, Throop	Bournemouth, Christchurch and Poole
BH9	BOURNEMOUTH	Winton, Moordown, Throop, Muscliff	Bournemouth, Christchurch and Poole
BH10	BOURNEMOUTH	Kinson, East Howe, Northbourne, Redhill, Ensbury Park, Slades Farm, Talbot Village, Wallisdown	Bournemouth, Christchurch and Poole
BH11	BOURNEMOUTH	Kinson, Bear Cross, West Howe, Wallisdown, Bearwood	Bournemouth, Christchurch and Poole
BH12	POOLE	Branksome, Alderney, Upper Parkstone, Newtown, Bournemouth University	Bournemouth, Christchurch and Poole
BH13	POOLE	Canford Cliffs, Sandbanks, Branksome Park, Brownsea Island	Bournemouth, Christchurch and Poole; Dorset
BH14	POOLE	Lower Parkstone, Lilliput, Penn Hill	Bournemouth, Christchurch and Poole
BH15	POOLE	Poole Town Centre, Hamworthy, Longfleet, Oakdale, Poole Harbour minor islands	Bournemouth, Christchurch and Poole; Dorset
BH16	POOLE	Upton, Turlin Moor, Lytchett Minster, Lytchett Matravers, Holton Heath	Dorset; Bournemouth, Christchurch and Poole
BH17	POOLE	Canford Heath, Creekmoor, Waterloo	Bournemouth, Christchurch and Poole
BH18	BROADSTONE	Broadstone	Bournemouth, Christchurch and Poole
BH19	SWANAGE	Swanage, Studland, Langton Matravers, Worth Matravers	Dorset
BH20	WAREHAM	Wareham, Arne, Corfe Castle, West Lulworth, Wool, Bovington Camp, Bere Regis	Dorset
BH21	WIMBORNE	Wimborne, Corfe Mullen, Sturminster Marshall, Cranborne, Merley, Oakley, Three Legged Cross, Knowlton	Dorset; Bournemouth, Christchurch and Poole
BH22	FERNDOWN	Ferndown, West Moors, West Parley	Dorset
BH23	CHRISTCHURCH	Christchurch, Highcliffe, Burton, Sopley, Bransgore, Hurn, Bournemouth Airport	Bournemouth, Christchurch and Poole; New Forest
BH24	RINGWOOD	Ringwood, St Leonards, Ashley Heath, Burley, Holmsley	New Forest; Dorset
BH25	NEW MILTON	New Milton, Barton on Sea, Bashley, Wootton, Ossemsley	New Forest
BH31	VERWOOD	Verwood	Dorset

== Map ==
BH postcode area map, showing postcode districts in red and post towns in grey text, with links to nearby DT, SO and SP postcode areas.

== See also ==
- List of postcode areas in the United Kingdom
- Postcode Address File
