= Hoburne Park =

Area of Christchurch, Dorset, England

Coordinates: 50°44′39″N 1°43′50″W

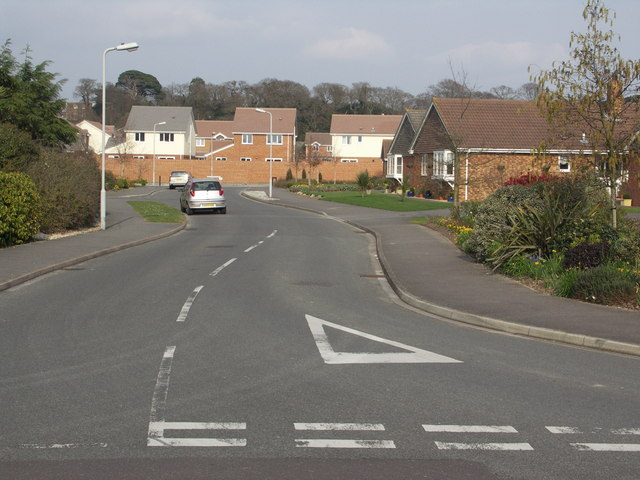
- Housing off Hoburne Lane

- Location within Dorset
- Unitary authority: Bournemouth, Christchurch and Poole
- Ceremonial county: Dorset
- Region: South West
- Country: England
- Sovereign state: United Kingdom
- Post town: BOURNEMOUTH
- Postcode district: BH
- Police: Dorset
- Fire: Dorset and Wiltshire
- Ambulance: South Western
- UK Parliament: Christchurch

Hoburne Park is an area of Christchurch, Dorset (historically Hampshire).

== History ==
Hoburne was named in the Domesday Book in 1086, in the Edgegate Hundered.

In the 20th century residential area was built on the land of the original Hoburne Farm.

== Places ==
- Hoburne Estate
- Hoburne Park

== Services ==
The main amenity in the area is the Hoburne Park Holiday Park.

== Politics ==
Hoburne is part of the Christchurch parliamentary constituency for elections to the House of Commons. It is currently represented by Conservative MP Christopher Chope.

For elections to Bournemouth, Christchurch and Poole Council, it is part of the Mudeford, Stanpit and West Highcliffe ward.
