= Waterloo, Dorset =

Suburb of Poole, Dorset, England

Coordinates: 50.747°N 1.988°W

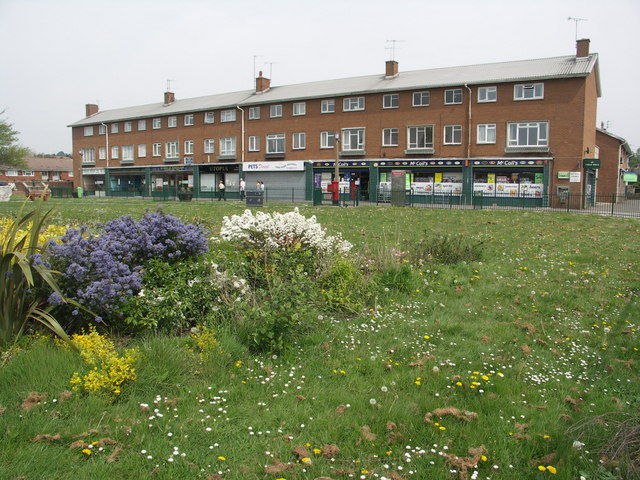
Parade of shops at Waterloo

Waterloo is a suburb of Poole, Dorset, England.

Once a small village near Broadstone, Waterloo is now a large housing estate. The estate was built in the early 1950s and covers an area of 85 acres (0.34 km^{2}).
