= Portfield, Dorset =

Coordinates: 50.7399°N 1.7870°W

Portfield
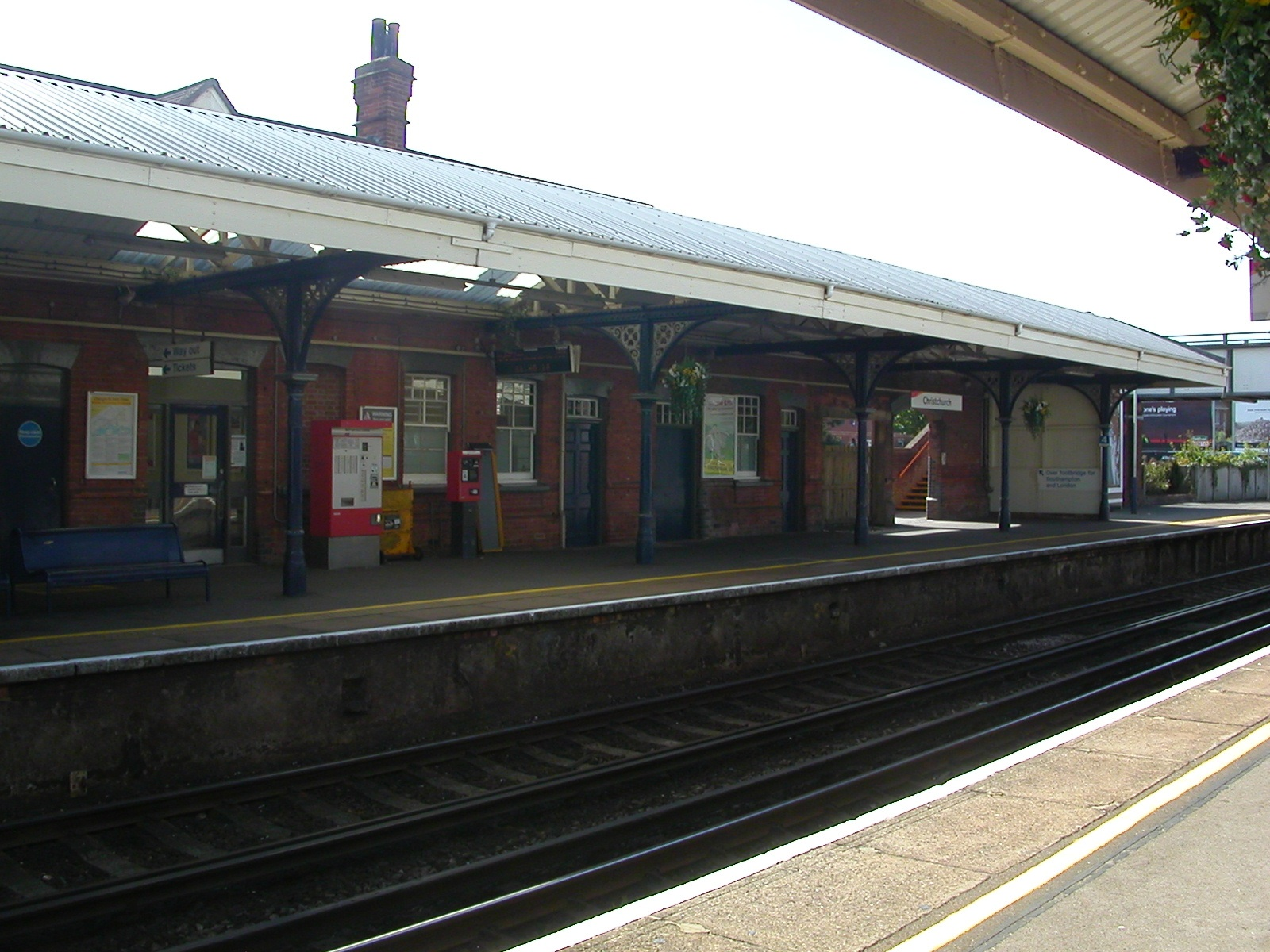
- Christchurch railway station, south of Portfield

- Location within Dorset
- Area: 1.1591 km^{2} (0.4475 sq mi)
- Population: 4,470 (2011 census)
  - Density: 3,856/km^{2} (9,990/sq mi)
- Civil parish: Christchurch
- Unitary authority: Bournemouth, Christchurch and Poole
- Ceremonial county: Dorset
- Region: South West
- Country: England
- Sovereign state: United Kingdom

Portfield is a suburb of Christchurch, Dorset. In 2011 the ward had a population of 4470.

== Services ==
Portfield is served by Portfield School. a special school for children with autism, and a community hall.

== Transport ==
Portfield is just to the north of Christchurch railway station.

== Schools ==
- Christchurch Junior School
- Christchurch Infant School

== Politics ==
Portfield is part of the Bournemouth, Christchurch and Poole Council. Portfield is part of the Christchurch parliamentary constituency for elections to the House of Commons. It is currently represented by Conservative MP Christopher Chope.
