= Alexandra Park, Poole =

Public park in Poole, England

Alexandra Park
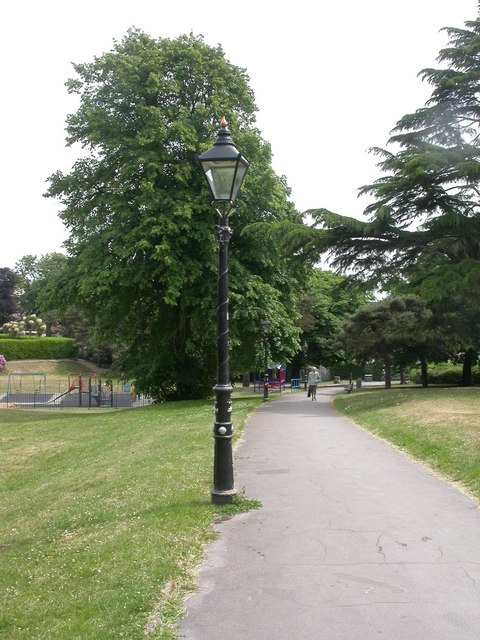
- Interactive map of Alexandra Park
- Location: Upper Parkstone, Poole
- Coordinates: 50°43′36″N 1°55′58″W
- Area: 5.4 acres (2.2 ha)
- Open: 1906

Alexandra Park is a small (six-acre) public open space set within the densely urbanised area of Parkstone in Poole, on the south coast of England. Its former bowling green and pavilion was home to Alexandra Park Lawn Bowls Club, established in the 1920s. The park is essentially Edwardian in concept, but evolved over a period of more than 30 years as what was once open farmland was transformed into a new residential neighbourhood. It is apparent that the space was set aside for recreation due to its steeply undulating topography, which would have been unsuitable for housing development. In 2019, the Bowling Greens Pavilion was transformerd into a café and the children's playground was refurbished with new equipment and facilities.

== History ==
The history of the park is adapted from a document prepared in 1995 by Paul Hillman, local historian and Landscape Architect for Borough of Poole from 1989 to 2008.

=== 1831–1905 ===
Virtually all the land constituting the park is part of the "Upper Parkstone Estate" – a significant area vested in the local authority by the Great Canford Award of 1831. The earliest indication that a plot of land amounting to 6 acres 2 rods and 35 poles (approximately 25,000 square metres or 2.5 hectares) was to be set aside as a public open space was in plans presented to the Council on 10 January 1885. The plans came about as a result of an invitation to a number of local architects for proposals laying out the Upper Parkstone Estate. Three plans were submitted, entitled:

- Au bon droit (which translates literally as "with good right" - right in the sense of a legal title, claim or due)
- Quod petis hic est ("whatever you seek is here")
- Spero ("hope")

Spero was selected and its architect awarded the sum of £25 0s 0d. "Spero 2006" can today be seen engraved at the top of the entrance pillars which were installed in 2009 to mark (a little later than originally planned) the park's centennial. The remaining two architects were awarded £7 7s 0d for their efforts.

While the original plans no longer exist, a 99-year lease dated 29 September 1885 has been found relating to a plot adjacent to the space that constitutes the park today, attached to which is a restrictive covenant forbidding any buildings to be erected on that area. Little further information has been found until 1901 when the area was clearly marked as open space on a development layout plan of the Upper Parkstone Estate. The lack of references may be because the area was slow to develop from open farmland; there would be little use for formal recreational space until new homes brought in the people to use it.

On 2 January 1903, the minutes of a meeting of the Council's Streets and Highways, Sanitary and Parks Committee make reference to a proposal that invited plans laying out the "Pleasure Grounds in Upper Parkstone". It is not clear what the plans were, but it is around that time that a suitable footpath network was installed, together with railings, gates and a noticeboard along a 56 ft (17 m) frontage of what is now Alexandra Road.

=== 1906 - 1930 ===
On 28 June 1906 the Council's Parks Committee resolved to call the pleasure grounds "Alexandra Park"; the presumption being that it is named after Queen Alexandra, consort of the reigning Edward VII, which is also the same reason for the naming of Queen's Park, Bournemouth, which occurred in 1902.

It is probably with the decision to name the pleasure grounds a park that attention focussed on detailed investment and laying out. In January 1907 steps were taken to prevent land owners on the southern boundary making rights of way to the park via garden gates. It was also in 1907 that initial steps were taken to acquire a means of access from Palmerston Road through the proposed line of building plots on the southern boundary. This particular issue took five years to resolve until in September 1912 a Mr John Joseph Norton offered a 20' access through what was referred to as Plot 63 for the sum of £63, with a restrictive covenant preventing vehicles from using the Palmerston Road access (which the Council had been trying to avoid). The Council agreed. The offer from Mr Norton was almost certainly enacted to assist the Council rather than for profit (other offers had been made from other plots that ranged between £80-£200 all of which were deemed too expensive). Mr Norton, a respected entrepreneur in the timber trade, and local philanthropist, acquired the necessary land from a Mr Crompton who the Council had already tried to negotiate with as far back as 1907. Mr Norton purchased the land and almost immediately offered it to the Council.

Meanwhile, in 1909 the Borough Surveyor was once again asked to prepare a scheme for laying out Alexandra Park with a view to applying for a loan sanction from the Local Government Board (LGB). It is unclear why proposals were never implemented but perhaps the LGB felt that, at that time, access to the site was too restrictive and would not sanction the loan. It was not until 23 January 1913, when the Borough Surveyor presented a plan for the laying out of the park, together with an estimate of £1,200 that the project progressed. While the Parks Committee requested an amended plan be submitted restricting the cost to £600, steps were taken to apply for a loan sanction to execute the works. On this occasion the application was successful; a loan of £600 was sanctioned on 20 February 1913.

Various contracts were subsequently let, including:

- February 1913 - the installation of a surface water drain by Mr G T Budden at a cost of £54 15s 0d
- June 1913 - the supply of seven seats by Burt & Vick at a cost of £18
- June 1913 - the supply and installation of railings by a Mr W H Seller

The supply of trees and shrubs was tendered between Mr H Haskins (now Haskins Garden Centres), Mr T Gardner and Mr C Stewart (Stewarts Garden Centres). Mr Stewart was successful with a tender sum of £50.

Consequently, Alexandra Park is ostensibly an Edwardian Park which evolved over a period of time. This process of evolution continued:

- July 1914 - all footpaths were upgraded to tarmac
- November 1914 - a 'memorial' (known as a petition today) was read to the Parks Committee requesting the Council take steps during the winter to lay out a bowling green and set up a Bowling Club.

Councillors resolved that they would be willing to lay out a green but the Great War of 1914-1918 appears to have then intervened and no progress was made until 1923. On 22 March of that year plans and estimates were put forward by the Borough Engineer for providing a bowling green at a cost of £1,200 with a small pavilion at an additional £130. The works were linked with a project at Branksome Park to create a bowling green, pavilion and tennis courts. An application for a loan sanction was made to the Local Government Board for the joint sum of £3,351 and subsequently approved on 19 June 1923. The original pavilion was built in the southwest corner of the bowling green and in 1931 an open shelter was added to the side of it.

=== Developments in the 1930s ===
In March 1933 the Parks Committee set up a special sub-committee to inspect the park and see what steps might be taken to improve it. This resulted in proposals put forward in October of that year:

1. Erection of a Caretaker's Lodge (budget £400)
2. Erection of a new, larger Bowling Pavilion (budget £475)
3. Conversion of the existing pavilion into public conveniences (£120)

With these proposals ensued a legal tussle with adjacent residents who objected to buildings being erected in the park. The basis of their objection was that covenants attached to the leases of properties surrounding the park restricted the construction of buildings on land constituting the park. This went back as far as an agreement dated 29 September 1885. The position adopted by the Council was to question whether this right had in effect been "estopped" by the inaction of adjoining property owners when the original pavilion had been erected in 1923. It was concluded that this view was marginal and negotiations were entered into with the objectors. Only partial agreement was reached so the Council made an application to extinguish the covenant insofar as the application for buildings, and an inquiry was held. The appointed arbitrator ultimately held in favour of the Council.

In March 1934, during the negotiation period, tenders were received from:

- S Whitelock & Company for the construction of a Caretaker's Lodge at a cost of £380 0s 0d, and from
- L J Newell & Sons for the construction of the new Bowling Pavilion at a cost of £392 0s 0d.

The original bowling pavilion was eventually converted into public conveniences in 1935.

=== Wartime & Postwar Developments ===
Very little changed in the park in the next 50 years. The railings and entrance gates are presumed to have been removed during the Second World War, along with those of other sites in Poole such as Poole Park. Supposedly this was to supply material for munitions, but many believe it was simply a morale boosting exercise.

The old-style gas lamps were converted in 1965 and replaced with modern lamp posts. A substation was built in 1966/67 close to the Palmerston Road entrance and an extension to the Bowling Pavilion requested in 1976 following the establishment of the Ladies Bowling Club in 1975. It is not clear when the children's play area was created, but it is known to have been fenced in 1989.

More recently the park has benefited from much-needed investment in the form of new gates and railings (2009), an improved and extended children's play area (2010) and resurfaced footpaths (2014).
