= Redhill, Bournemouth =

Area of Bournemouth in Dorset, England

Coordinates: 50.756667°N 1.885°W

Redhill
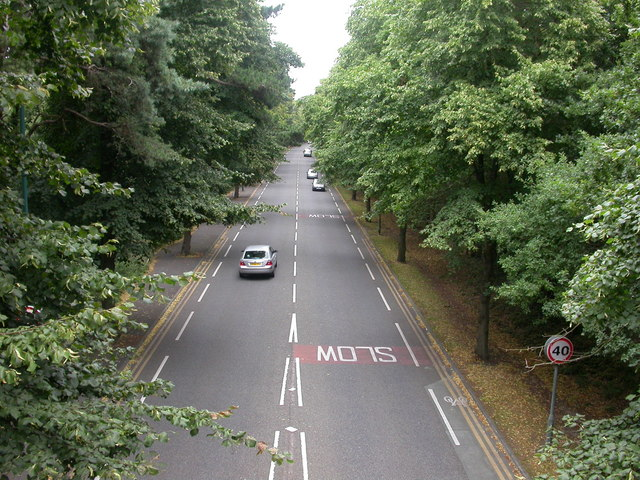
- Redhill Avenue, Redhill

- Location within Dorset
- Unitary authority: Bournemouth, Christchurch and Poole
- Ceremonial county: Dorset
- Region: South West
- Country: England
- Sovereign state: United Kingdom
- Post town: BOURNEMOUTH
- Postcode district: BH
- Police: Dorset
- Fire: Dorset and Wiltshire
- Ambulance: South Western
- UK Parliament: Bournemouth West

Redhill is a northern suburb of Bournemouth, Dorset in England.

== History ==
Historically part of Hampshire, Redhill was known archaically known as Redhall.

In 1870-72, John Marius Wilson's Imperial Gazetteer of England and Wales described Holdenhurst like this:

HOLDENHURST, a village and a parish in Christchurch district, Hants. The village stands on the river Stour, 3 miles NW of Christchurch r. station. The parish contains the tythings of Redhall, Moordown, Charminster, Stronden [sic], Great Dean and Little Down, Muccleshell, Muscliffe, and Throop; extends to the coast: and is all included in Christchurch borough.

== Geography ==
Redhill borders Ensbury Park from the west, Northbourne to the north, Moordown to the west and Winton to the south.

== Park ==
Redhill is centred on Redhill Park.

== Politics ==
Redhill is part of the Redhill and Northbourne ward for elections to Bournemouth, Christchurch and Poole Council which elects two councillors.

Redhill is part of the Bournemouth West parliamentary constituency.

== Gallery ==
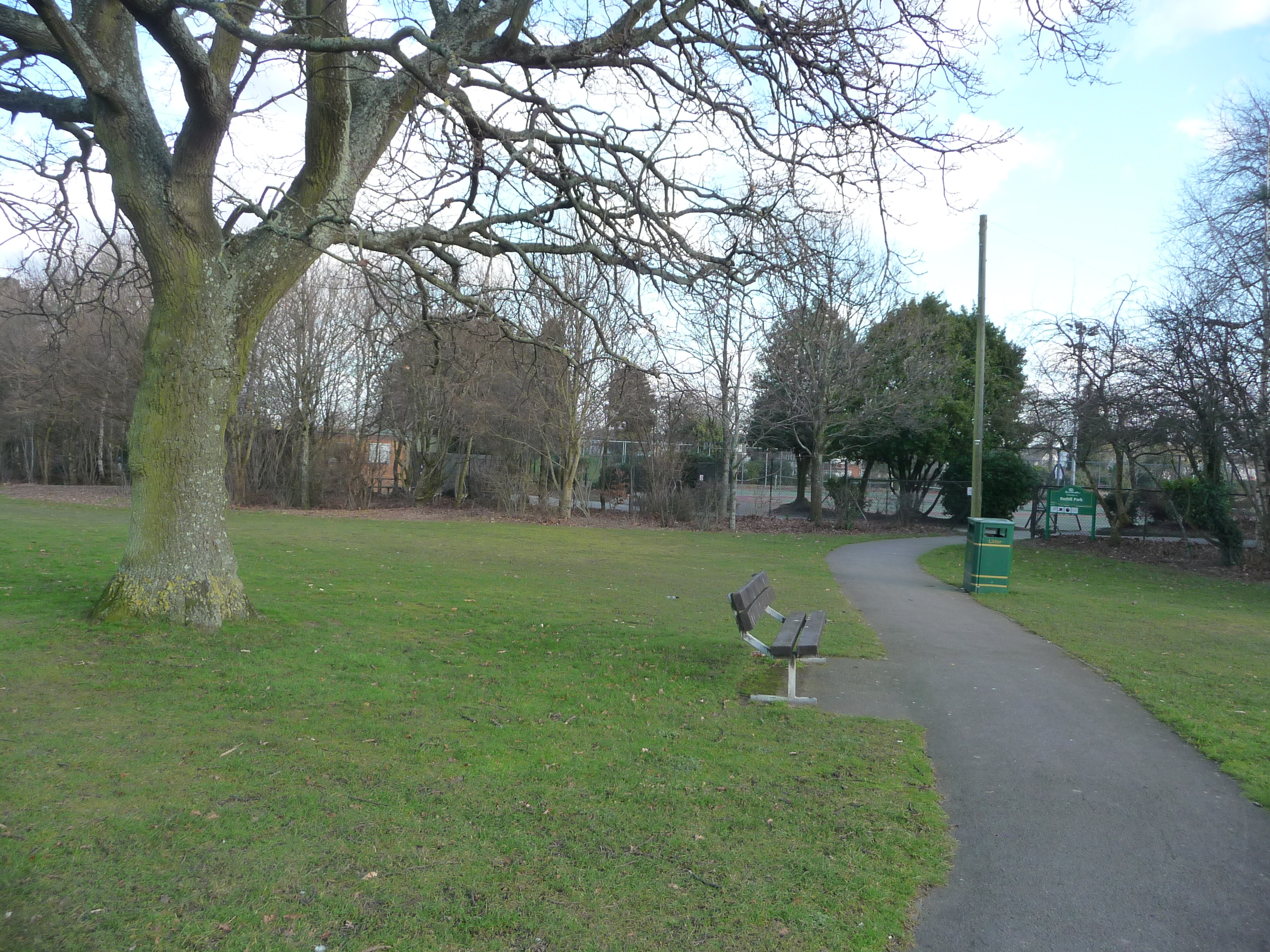
Redhill Park

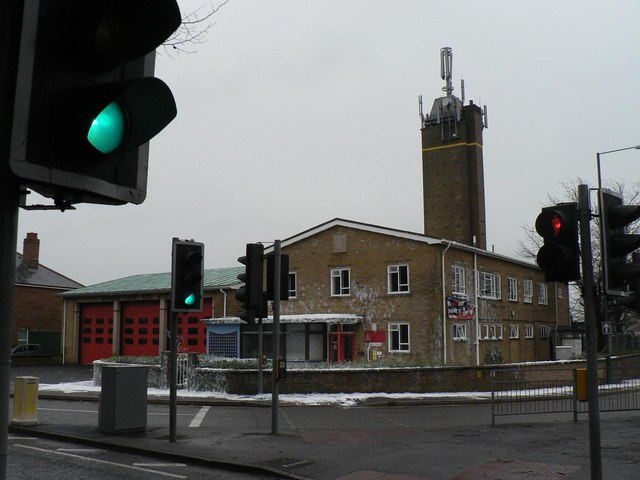
Redhill Park Fire Station

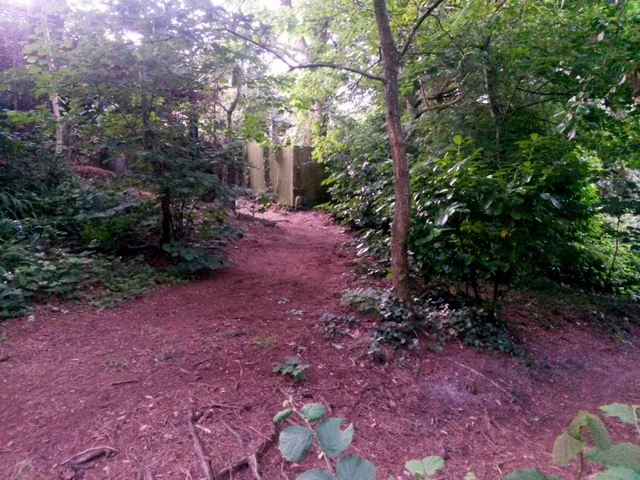
Redhill Common

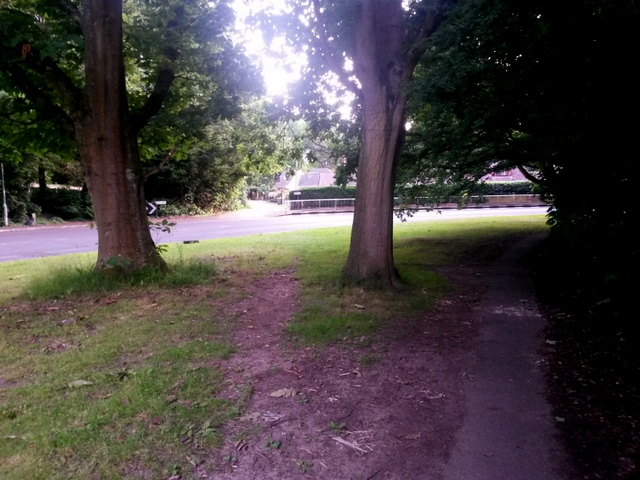
Redhill bridleway

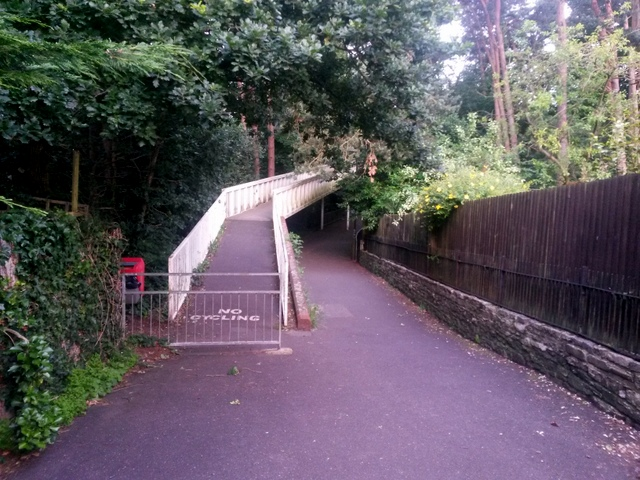
Redhill footbridge
