= Broadstone, Dorset =

Suburb of Poole, Dorset, England

Coordinates: 50.76046°N 1.99495°W

Broadstone
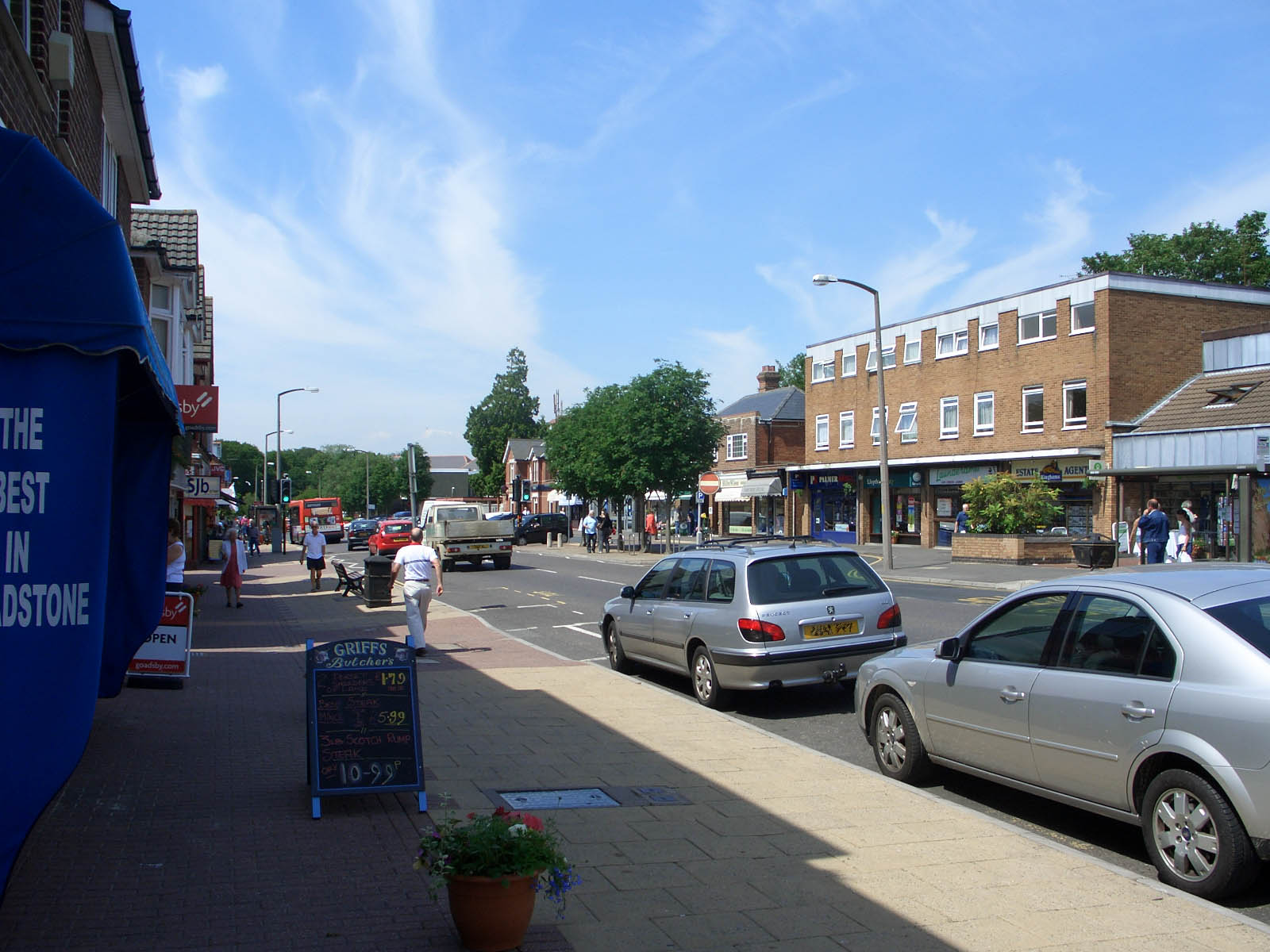
- The Broadway

- Location within Dorset
- Population: 10,289 2021
- OS grid reference: SZ006953
  - London: 109 miles (175 km) NE
- Civil parish: Broadstone
- Unitary authority: Bournemouth, Christchurch and Poole
- Ceremonial county: Dorset
- Region: South West
- Country: England
- Sovereign state: United Kingdom
- Post town: BROADSTONE
- Postcode district: BH18
- Dialling code: 01202
- Police: Dorset
- Fire: Dorset and Wiltshire
- Ambulance: South Western
- UK Parliament: Mid Dorset and North Poole

Broadstone /ˈbrɔːdstən/ is a town and civil parish and electoral ward of the Bournemouth, Christchurch and Poole district, in the ceremonial county of Dorset, England. It is located three miles (five kilometres) from Hamworthy railway station and seven miles (eleven kilometres) from Bournemouth Airport. The ward had a population of 10,289 at the 2021 census.

Since 1840, Broadstone has grown from a small farm to a suburb of 10,000 people. Centred on the main road (the B3074), 'The Broadway' is a busy hub of shops, churches, schools and housing. Broadstone is notable for its large recreation fields and heathland park, as well as an annual Christmas parade and lights. The 24-acre (10-hectare) Broadstone Heath possesses some of the original heathland which covered the Poole Basin.

== History ==
In 1840, "Broadstone Farm" was built, and a railway line bypassed it in 1847. Its first church was built in 1853, which later became the Scout Association hall. The first Broadstone railway station was built in 1872; initially named "New Poole Junction", it became "Broadstone" in 1890. Broadstone First School originated as a Dame school, founded in 1871. At the turn of the century, lavender oil started being produced. This ceased in 1935 when the factory burnt down, but much lavender can still be found in the area. Rapid expansion of the town has since occurred, with the development of the Pine Springs housing estate and the opening of additional schools to cope with the increase in population. On 1 April 2026 Broadstone became a civil parish.

== Toponymy ==
Legend has it that a number of "broad stones" were laid across a local stream to enable people to cross over without wetting their feet. This stream flows in the valley between Clarendon Road and Springdale Road, and the stones were located close to the Brookdale Farm. The Stepping Stones pub (now renamed 'The Blackwater Stream' since its takeover by J D Wetherspoon) was named in honour of this, and displays a large stone outside its beer garden. Rumoured to be the original, it was stolen decades ago and has since been replaced by a replica. There are also two stones outside Broadstone United Reformed Church, supposedly also originals from the stream.

== Notable residents ==
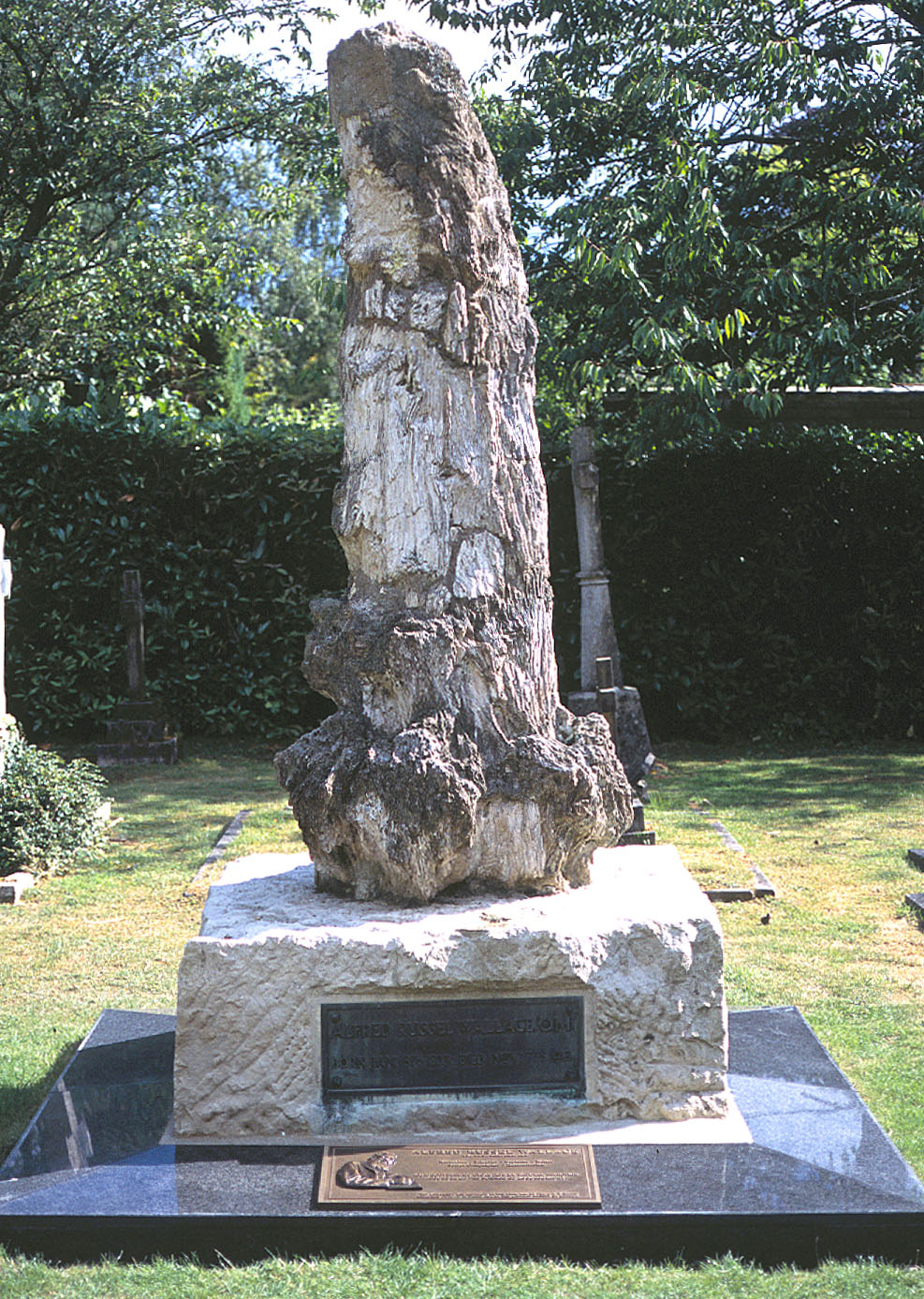
Wallace's grave in Broadstone Cemetery

The Victorian era biologist, naturalist and philosopher Alfred Russel Wallace, who independently proposed the same evolutionary theory as Charles Darwin, lived in Broadstone during the last few years of his life. He built his own house, named Old Orchard, near what is now Wallace Road. His remains are buried in Broadstone Cemetery, next to those of his wife, Annie. His grave was restored by the A. R. Wallace Memorial Fund in 2000. It features a 7-foot-tall (2.1-metre) fossilised coniferous tree trunk mounted on a block of Purbeck limestone.

Annette Brooke, a Liberal Democrat MP for Mid-Dorset and North Poole from 2001 to 2015, resided in Broadstone.

Bryan Telfer, a commodore in the Royal Navy and veteran of the Falklands War is buried in Broadstone Cemetery.

Victor Watkins who lived in Broadstone was the first Scout in England to gain the Kings Scout Award. He is commemorated with a blue plaque on 29029 Nepalese Restaurant at 205 Lower Blandford Road, Broadstone, Poole.

Stuart Hibberd, the chief announcer of the BBC (or "voice of the BBC") for 25 years who announced the deaths of King George V and Adolf Hitler, died in Broadstone in 1983. Broadstone was their family home.

As a child, actor Richard Todd lived in Broadstone.

Dutch playwright Jan Fabricius resided at Caesar's Camp, a house on Broadstone Heights.

== Education ==
Broadstone follows the three-tier education model and contains two first schools (Broadstone First and Springdale First) and a middle school (Broadstone Middle School). Corfe Hills School, an academy school, is also located in Broadstone and is one of the largest secondary schools in Dorset. Its catchment area serves Broadstone, Poole, Corfe Mullen, Wimborne, Merley as well as other areas.

== Politics ==
Broadstone
- ward Bournemouth, Christchurch and Poole Council
- Boundary of Broadstone in Bournemouth, Christchurch and Poole.

Current ward
- Created: 2019
- Councillor: Peter Thomas Sidaway (Liberal Democrats)
- Councillor: Vikki Slade (Liberal Democrats)

2003–2019
- Number of councillors: 3
- UK Parliament constituency: Poole
- UK Parliament constituency: Mid Dorset and North Poole

Broadstone is in the Mid Dorset and North Poole parliamentary constituency for elections to the House of Commons.

Broadstone ward elects two councillors to Bournemouth, Christchurch and Poole Council. Before 2019, it was represented by three councillors on Poole Borough Council.

=== Councillors ===
The ward is currently represented by two Liberal Democrat councillors.

Election	Councillors		
2003	Michael Brooke (Liberal Democrats)	Graham Mason (Liberal Democrats)	David Newell (Conservative)
2007	Michael Brooke (Liberal Democrats)	Graham Mason (Liberal Democrats)	Daniel Martin (Liberal Democrats)
2011	Michael Brooke (Liberal Democrats)	Vikki Slade (Liberal Democrats)	Roy Godfrey (Liberal Democrats)
2015	Michael Brooke (Liberal Democrats)	Joanne Tomlin (Conservative)	David Newell (Conservative)
2016 by-election	Michael Brooke (Liberal Democrats)	Vikki Slade (Liberal Democrats)	David Newell (Conservative)
Bournemouth, Christchurch and Poole
2019	Michael Brooke (Liberal Democrats)	Vikki Slade (Liberal Democrats)	Seat Abolished
2023	Peter Thomas Sidaway (Liberal Democrats)	Vikki Slade (Liberal Democrats)	Seat Abolished

== Clubs and associations ==
Broadstone is the centre of many clubs, societies and organisations for the South East Dorset area including The Lytchett archery club, Broadstone Football Club, the Broadstone Golf Club, Broadstone Horticultural society, Broadstone Tennis Society, Dorset Caledonian Society, Broadstone Scout Group, Broadstone Youth Centre and the Broadstone Cricket Club. Other local offices include the British Legion, the Rotary club, and the Broadstone Wessex Bowling Club.
