= Ensbury Park =

Suburb of Bournemouth, England

Coordinates: 50.753°N 1.891°W

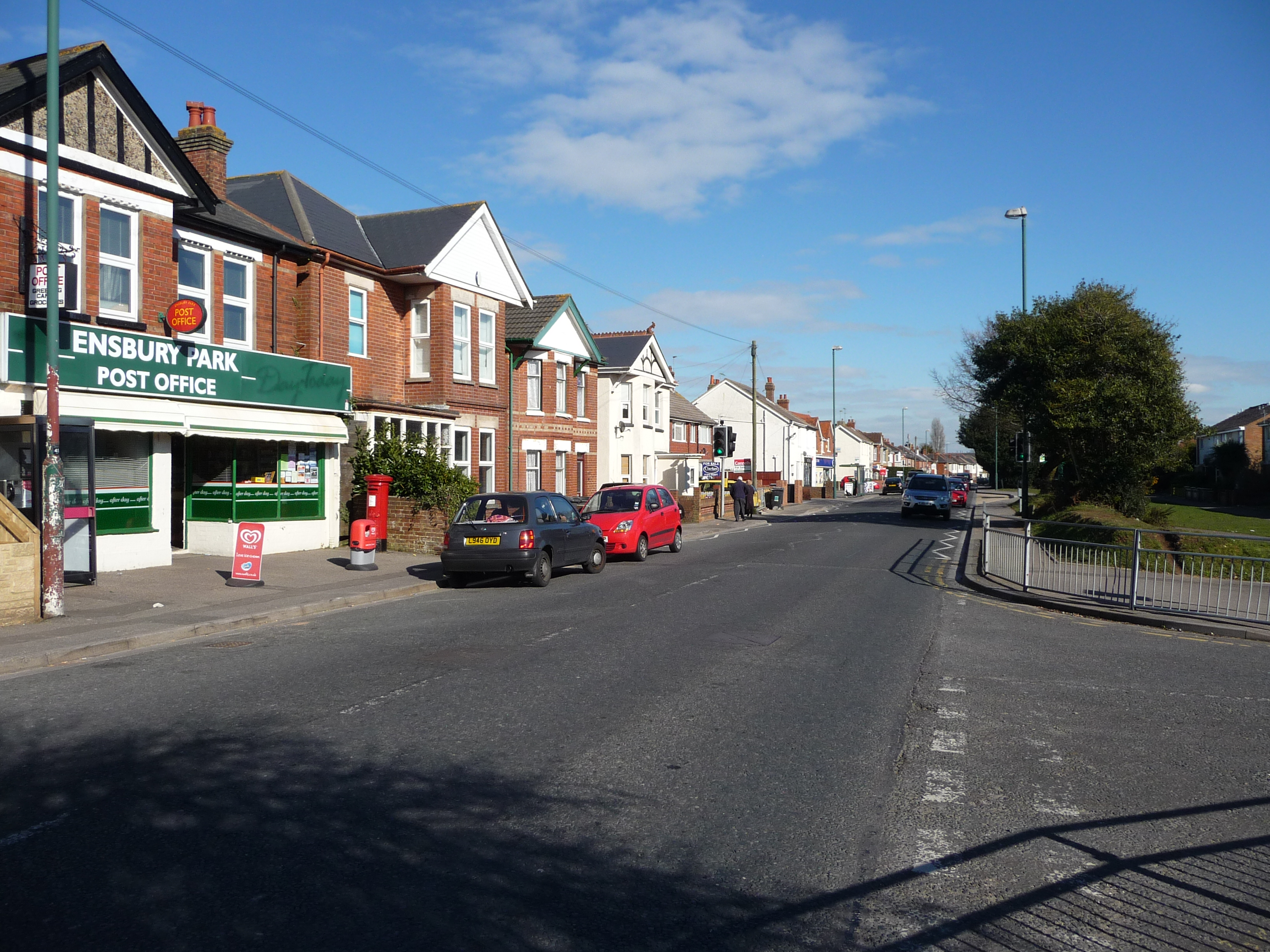
- Columbia Road, Ensbury Park

- Location within Dorset
- OS grid reference: SZ0794
- Unitary authority: Bournemouth, Christchurch and Poole
- Ceremonial county: Dorset
- Region: South West
- Country: England
- Sovereign state: United Kingdom
- Post town: BOURNEMOUTH
- Postcode district: BH10
- Dialling code: 01202
- Police: Dorset
- Fire: Dorset and Wiltshire
- Ambulance: South Western
- UK Parliament: Bournemouth West

Ensbury Park is a mainly residential suburb of Bournemouth, in Dorset, England. It includes the housing estate of Slades Farm and lies within the ward district of Northbourne and Redhill.

== Initial development ==
Ensbury Park takes its name from the Saxon hamlet of Ensbury, a separate area altogether which lay a mile or so to the north. This hamlet, just east of Kinson, has now been more or less subsumed into the postwar suburb of Northbourne but in the first half of the twentieth century, Ensbury Manor and Ensbury Farm constituted the borders of what later became the Ensbury Park district. In the 1920s Ensbury Park boasted a racecourse, which also served as an aerodrome. For several years it was known as “Bournemouth Aerodrome” and was the venue for Air Race Meetings, though a series of fatal crashes at the Whitsun meet in 1927 led to its decline and eventual sale for housing development. Much of the land associated with Ensbury Farm was sold off for housebuilding in the 1930s: the vending agents were A. J. Abbott & Sons, who coined the name 'Ensbury Park' for their new development.

The district was incorporated into the County Borough of Bournemouth in 1931, having theretofore been part of the Poole Rural District. The main road through the area at that time was Columbia Road which remains the principal route through the district, also nowadays connecting the Boundary Lane one-way system to Kinson Road.

== Facilities municipal and temporal ==
Ensbury Park has three churches that serve the local residents: St Thomas' Parish Church, the Catholic Church of Our Lady of Victories and St Bernadette's (the first church in Europe to be dedicated to the French visionary saint), and Howeth Road Evangelical Church. Ensbury Park Methodist Church opened in 1926 but was demolished in the 21st century.

There are four schools in the area: Winton Academy (formerly Winton Arts and Media College) on Winton Way, Glenmoor Academy, a girls' school on Beswick Avenue, Kingsleigh Primary School (mixed) on Hadow Road, and Hillview Primary School (mixed).

There is a community centre in Ensbury Avenue that is part of a complex which also comprises an adult education and teachers' centre. There is also a small library in Columbia Road which is in fact the smallest in the borough. The area is covered by Redhill Fire Station in Redhill Avenue, approximately 100 yards from The Ensbury Park.

Morebus operate a bus service through the area which runs along the main Columbia Road.

== Landmarks and buildings ==
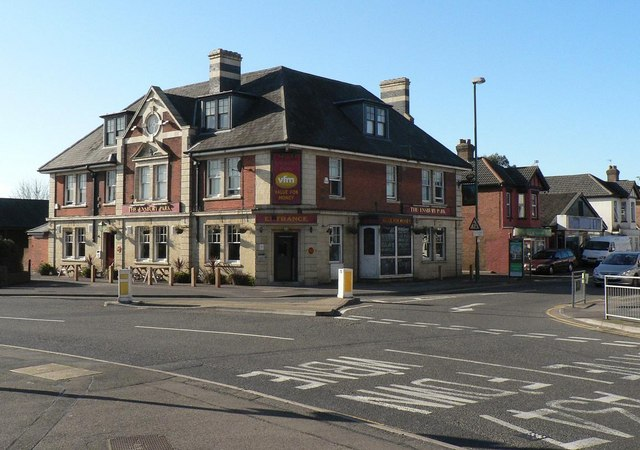
The Ensbury Park public house (2008).

One of the most conspicuous buildings in the district is The Ensbury Park public house which is on the corner of Columbia Road and Boundary Road. This started life as The Ensbury Park Hotel, planning permission for which was granted by Poole Rural District Council on 15 December 1924.

The building, with its neo-Georgian design elements, echoes 'Ensbury Manor' which included a genuine Georgian wing, and which dominated Ensbury Village for several centuries until being demolished in 1936.

The pub closed suddenly in 2014, its lease having been surrendered to the freeholder, Enterprise Inns. In October 2015 the ground floor of building was taken over by the Co-Op and the rest became flats, although the iconic Ensbury Park Hotel sign remains on the building.

== Present day ==
Ensbury Park had in the past a selection of shops, mainly along Columbia Road, though these have predominantly become private dwellings. A small selection of local convenience stores remains around the Redhill end, near junction of Columbia Road, Boundary Road, Ensbury Park Road and Redhill Avenue.

This area remains a popular choice for home buyers due to it being a relatively quiet locale. There are recreational facilities nearby such as Redhill Park which has tennis courts, bowling green, outdoor paddling pool, cafe and a playground. Facilities for football, cricket, skateboarding, etc. are also available at Slade's Farm Recreation Ground.

On 10 September 2010 Bournemouth Borough Council announced that work would start on a new Olympic size community cycle track at Slade's Farm. The track opened as the Bournemouth Cycling Centre in June 2011, allowing the entire community to enjoy activities including competitive cycle training and racing, learning to ride a bike, cycling for exercise, in-line skating and running.

== Politics ==
Ensbury Park is divided between the wards of Redhill and Northbourne and Wallisdown and Winton West.

Ensbury Park is part of the Bournemouth West constituency.
