= Parkstone =

Area of Poole, Dorset, England

Coordinates: 50.71°N 1.95°W

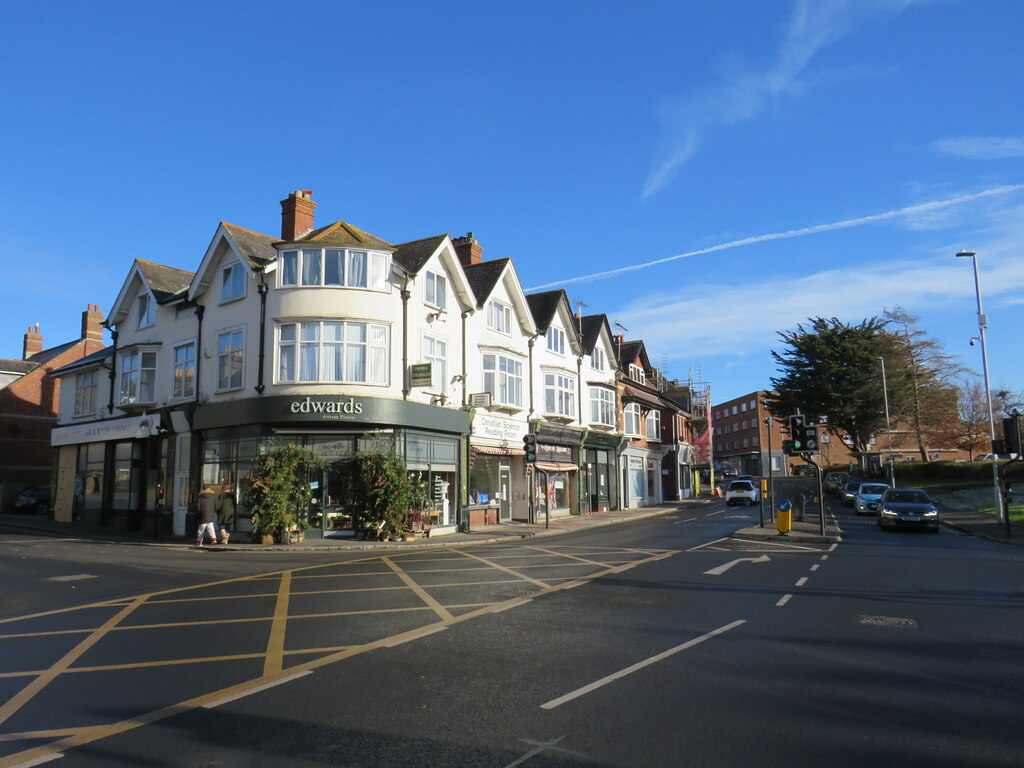
- Ashley Cross, Lower Parkstone

- Location within Dorset
- Population: 10,779 (2011)
- OS grid reference: SZ0391
- Unitary authority: Bournemouth, Christchurch and Poole
- Ceremonial county: Dorset
- Region: South West
- Country: England
- Sovereign state: United Kingdom
- Post town: POOLE
- Postcode district: BH12/BH14
- Dialling code: 01202
- Police: Dorset
- Fire: Dorset and Wiltshire
- Ambulance: South Western
- UK Parliament: Poole

Parkstone /ˈpɑːrkstən/ is an area of Poole, in the Bournemouth, Christchurch and Poole district, in the ceremonial county of Dorset, England. It is divided into 'Lower' and 'Upper' Parkstone. Upper Parkstone – "Up-on-'ill" as it used to be known in local parlance – is so-called because it is largely on higher ground slightly to the north of the lower-lying area of Lower Parkstone – "The Village" – which includes areas adjacent to Poole Harbour.

Because of the proximity to the shoreline, and the more residential nature of Lower Parkstone, it is the more sought-after district, and originally included Lilliput and the Sandbanks peninsula (now part of Canford Cliffs) within its official bounds. Lower Parkstone is centred on Ashley Cross, the original location of Parkstone Grammar School, near to the parish church of St. Peter.

Upper Parkstone includes large areas of smaller artisan housing, the shopping district along Ashley Road and the parish church of St. John's, Heatherlands. There are larger properties, however, and views from this higher part of the suburb across Poole Harbour to the Purbeck Hills. Many photographs taken over the years from the Seaview viewpoint (overlooking much of Poole centre and Harbour) exist as postcards, and can be used to chart the changes to the area.

Parkstone is just south of Alder Hills, and east of the Parkstone Bay area of Poole Harbour.

== History ==
The "Upper Parkstone Estate" was a significant area of land vested in the local authority by the Great Canford Award of 1831, but it was slow to develop into the bustling neighbourhood of today. In January 1885 a plot of land amounting to 6 acres 2 rods and 35 poles (approximately 2.5 hectares) was set aside as a public open space in plans presented to the council as a result of an invitation to a number of local architects for proposals laying out the estate. But what is now known as "Alexandra Park" is essentially Edwardian in concept, having evolved over a period of some 30 years (1885–1915). The name dates from June 1906, the presumption being that it is named after Queen Alexandra, consort of the reigning Edward VII.

Much of Upper Parkstone was developed during the Victorian era and is typical for a development of that period, most of the main shops being situated along a main road (Ashley Road) together with a few pubs and churches, and most houses being in adjacent roads. A lot of roads are named after important people or events of their time, such as Albert Road, Victoria Road and Jubilee Road.

Despite the residential reputation, Parkstone was the site of several industrial undertakings, the largest being George Jennings South Western Pottery, a manufacturer of salt-glaze drainage and sanitary pipes, which had its own steam locomotive and private branch line from Parkstone railway station. Much of this area was agricultural until the 1920s and 1930s.

Parkstone was formerly a tything and chapelry in the parish of Canford Magna, in 1866 Parkstone became a separate civil parish, on 9 November 1905 the parish was abolished and merged with Poole. In 1901 the parish had a population of 6,550. It is now in the unparished area of Poole.

The area expanded into other areas such as Rossmore and later Alderney, which are sometimes considered to be part of Parkstone. Although most houses in the district are owner-occupied, council houses were also built in the 1930s, 1940s and 1950s. The Trinidad and Bourne Estates are typical examples of post-war housing estates although there are very few council flats in Parkstone as much of the area retains its suburban character.

As of 2012, Ashley Road continues to be principally made up of commercial premises. Though some small blocks of flats have been built along this thoroughfare over the last 20 years, surrounding areas such as Rossmore have changed little during that time. A few older cottage-style dwellings can still be found as reminders of when the area was agricultural, including several pairs of 'Lady Wimborne' houses: yellow-brick cottages with steep gables built by the Canford Estate, whose lands stretched from Longham to Lilliput.

== Transport ==
Ashley Road is one of the main roads between Bournemouth and Poole and benefits from much through business, and is the site of Waitrose supermarket. Bournemouth Road/Commercial Road is the other main thoroughfare, passing through Ashley Cross and providing another through route and bus routes from Poole to Bournemouth.

Parkstone railway station is in Lower Parkstone, near Ashley Cross. It is on the South West Main Line between Weymouth and London Waterloo. Until 1966 it was also served by the Somerset and Dorset Joint Railway to Bath.

== Education ==
Parkstone has a large number of schools for all ages. The North Road and Constitution Hill campuses of The Bournemouth and Poole College also have Parkstone addresses.

In Lower Parkstone the schools are:

- Courthill Infant School
- Lilliput Infant School
- Baden Powell and St Peter's Junior School

In Upper Parkstone the schools are:

- Sylvan Infant School which feeds into Branksome Heath Junior School.
- Bishop Aldhelm's Primary School, Manorside Primary School, Talbot Primary School and Branksome Heath Junior School which all feed into St Aldhelm's Academy.
- St Joseph's Primary School, a Roman Catholic school
- Winchelsea Special School, next to Manorside in Alderney.

There is also an independent school in the area, Bournemouth Collegiate Prep School, on the site of the former Uplands School.

== Religious buildings ==
- Parkstone United Reformed Church
- St Dunstan of Canterbury Orthodox Church
- St. Peter's Church, Parkstone
- Salterns Road Methodist Church

== Areas of Parkstone ==
The following estates and districts are often categorised as part of Parkstone, in local trade directories, for instance:

- Alderney
- Ashley Cross
- Heatherlands
- Lilliput
- Newtown
- Penn Hill
- Rossmore
- Sea View
- Whitecliff
