= East Howe =

Area of Bournemouth, England

Coordinates: 50.757°N 1.901°W

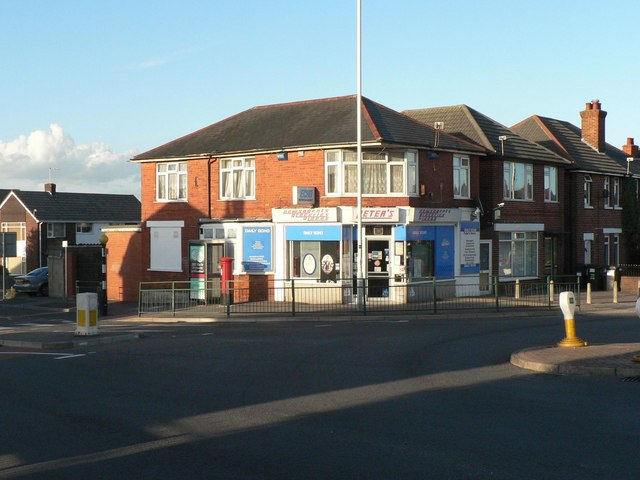
- Newsagent's and former post office in East Howe

- Location within Dorset
- OS grid reference: SZ071953
- Unitary authority: Bournemouth, Christchurch and Poole
- Ceremonial county: Dorset
- Region: South West
- Country: England
- Sovereign state: United Kingdom
- Post town: BOURNEMOUTH
- Postcode district: BH10
- Dialling code: 01202
- Police: Dorset
- Fire: Dorset and Wiltshire
- Ambulance: South Western
- UK Parliament: Bournemouth West

East Howe is a residential district of the town of Bournemouth, Dorset on the south coast of England.

== Origins ==
The district takes its name from the now-archaic English word "howe", variously defined as denoting a depression or a stretch of high ground. There is a ridge of high ground stretching across to the west, which appears to have given rise to the toponyms High Howe, West Howe and East Howe, certainly prior to 1826 when all three settlements were marked on Greenwood's map of Dorset. Previously, a 'How Corner' had featured on Paterson's 1785 map of Dorset, seemingly denoting a bend in the Poole to Ringwood road (now the A348) as it passed through the High Howe area.

== 'Headless Cross Lane' ==
East Howe is approached from the ancient district of Kinson via East Howe Lane, which was known as 'Headless Cross Lane' in the 1920s on account of the T-shape formed by its junction with Wimborne Road. This T-junction was marked as 'Headless Cross' on Ordnance Survey maps between 1888 and 1969. Previously it had been known as 'Rigler's Cross' after William Rigler, a landowner at the time of the 1851 census, whose descendants still live in the Kinson and East Howe areas. The junction was reconfigured in 1962 when Broadway Lane was extended to meet up with Headless Cross; around the same time, land on the south-west side of the junction was acquired by Bournemouth Borough Council who proceeded to lay it out as a recreation area. The area was to be christened 'Headless Cross Park', but on reflection this was thought to sound too gruesome and 'East Howe Recreation Ground' was suggested as an alternative.

== Brook Road ==
Further south, East Howe Lane is joined by Brook Road in which there once stood Howe Lodge, an eighteenth-century property, thought to have been home to the local smuggler and landowner Isaac Gulliver. Described as a "rambling battlemented manor house", it was demolished in 1958 to allow for road-widening. Its last tenant prior to demolition was William Charles Veal, who rented it from Bournemouth Borough Council and ran a timber-yard there; when digging in the garden, soon after he moved in around 1947, he came upon a brick tunnel and was able to walk along it for 30 or 40 yards before it came to a sudden stop. The tunnel was accessed via a cellar beneath a trapdoor in the living room, presumably a relic of Gulliver's smuggling past.

== Politics ==
East Howe is part of the Bournemouth West parliamentary constituency. East Howe is divided between two wards for elections to Bournemouth, Christchurch and Poole Council; Kinson and Redhill and Northbourne.
