= West Howe =

Coordinates: 50.757°N 1.920°W

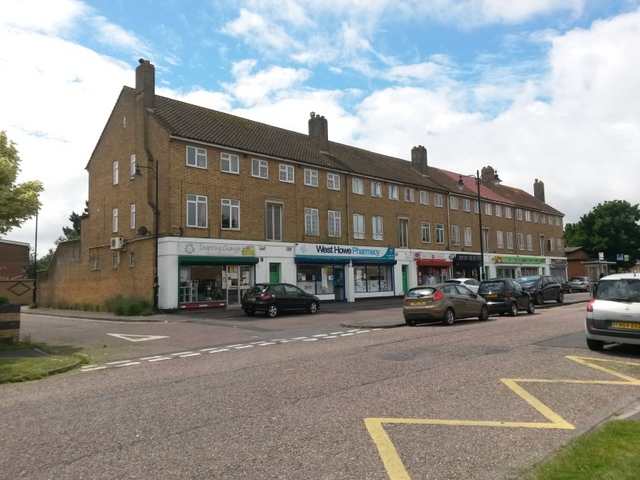
- Shops on Cunningham Crescent

- Location within Dorset
- OS grid reference: SZ0568
- Unitary authority: Bournemouth, Christchurch and Poole
- Ceremonial county: Dorset
- Region: South West
- Country: England
- Sovereign state: United Kingdom
- Post town: BOURNEMOUTH
- Postcode district: BH11
- Dialling code: 01202
- Police: Dorset
- Fire: Dorset and Wiltshire
- Ambulance: South Western
- UK Parliament: Bournemouth West

West Howe is a suburb of Bournemouth, Dorset, England, located in the north-west provinces of the borough.

Largely consisting of affordable housing owned by the Local Authority, many of the homes have been purchased by long term residents of the area.

== Origins ==
The district takes its name from the Old English noun 'howe', usually defined as denoting a ridge of elevated ground. Certainly, there is a ridge of high land in this part of Bournemouth, and it was along this ridge that the hamlets of High Howe, West Howe and East Howe were established.

The area was mainly farmland until the early years of the twentieth century, when E. A. Elliot moved his pottery works here from Bear Cross further north. The clay was superior to that at Bear Cross and from 1912, roofing tiles and terra cotta ware were manufactured here in addition to bricks that were being used in the course of Bournemouth's urban expansion. By 1927, bricks for domestic fireplaces were also being manufactured here along with drainage pipes, this continuing until 1966 when the potteries were closed.

== Development ==
There were few properties in West Howe whilst the area was part of the Canford estate, with the exclusion of six Lady Wimborne Cottages which housed farm labourers in this rural area. However, in the late 1940s Bournemouth Borough Council began developing estates in the wake of the post-war housing crisis. However, a few pre-war properties did exist. On the western boundary of the area stood the Shoulder of Mutton pub and next to this, a house built by Mr. Sherry, a baker from Winton in Bournemouth, who had become mentally unstable and had retired from the bakery; periodically, he was said to ride on a white horse through Winton, announcing himself as the new Messiah.

Life on the post-war estates at West Howe was hardly idyllic; Stillmore Road, in particular, acquired the nickname "Slag Alley", on account of the black dust that billowed into houses from the roof-high mounds of slag on nearby industrial land. Several types of slag could be found lurking in West Howe properties. A deputation of tenants raised the matter with Bournemouth Borough Council in 1958. The council solved the problem by putting the slag company in touch with a local firm that made breeze blocks out of clinker slag; this appears to have abated the nuisance.

== Community ==
In 2007, it was reported that West Howe was one of the most economically deprived areas in England, with an estimated 37% of the population living below the poverty line. West Howe has three schools, three churches, two community centres, a library, a post office and a health centre in Cunningham Crescent. The parade of shops in Cunningham Crescent include a charity shop, a pharmacy, a post office, hairdressers, a convenience store and a takeaway.

== Politics ==
West Howe is part of the Bournemouth West parliamentary constituency. West Howe is part of the Kinson ward which elects three councillors to Bournemouth, Christchurch and Poole Council.

== Bibliography ==
West Howe History Group, West Howe Proper (Wimborne: Word and Action (Dorset) Ltd., 1983). ISBN 0-904939-28-6
