= Northbourne, Bournemouth =

Area of Bournemouth, Dorset, England

Coordinates: 50°46.2′N 1°53.4′W

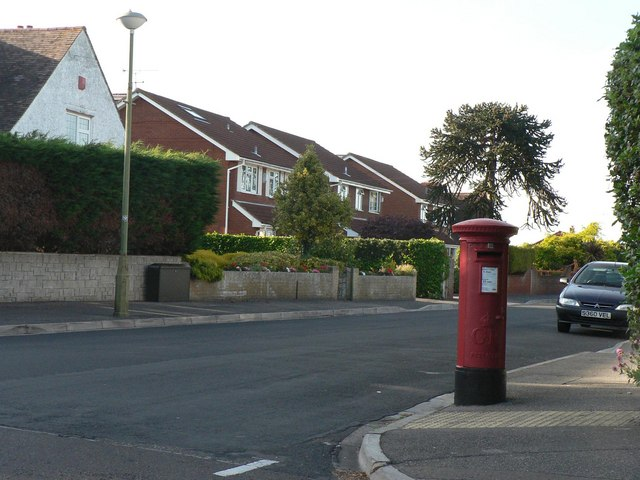
Headswell Avenue, Redhill.

Northbourne is a suburb of Bournemouth, Dorset in England. It is in the north of the town and borders Ensbury Park.

== History ==
Northbourne stands on what was once part of the Ensbury Estate one of the earliest settlements that sprung up along the River Stour before Bournemouth was founded.

The historic Grade II Listed Dower House in Wimborne Road is to the west of the suburb.

Northbourne became a post-war suburb of Bournemouth.

== Areas ==
Hill View is an area of Northbourne. Hill View road links Northbourne to Redhill.

== Environment ==
There are several Gateways on to The Stour and the scenic Stour Valley Nature Reserve which runs along down to the Hamlets of Throop and Holdenhurst creating a series of countryside Walks The former Old Vicarage serves as a Toby Carvery. The 1930s Crown Pub is also in the area.

== Services ==
The GP surgery closed in 2017. Northbourne is close to Bournemouth Airport.

== Education ==
Hill View Primary School.

== Politics ==
Northbourne is part of the Redhill and Northbourne ward for elections to Bournemouth, Christchurch and Poole Council which elect two councillors.

Northbourne is part of the Bournemouth West parliamentary constituency.
