= List of fatal accidents and incidents involving Royal Air Force aircraft from 1945 =

Many hundreds of fatal accidents and incidents involving military aircraft operated by the Royal Air Force have occurred since 1945, the great majority of them before the end of the Cold War. They are grouped by the year in which the accident or incident occurred. Combat losses and aircraft operated by experimental establishments not on RAF strength are not included. This is a very far from complete list: for example a total of 890 Gloster Meteors were lost in RAF service (145 of these crashes occurring in 1953 alone), resulting in the deaths of some 450 pilots.

== 1940s ==
1945

- On 29 September PD343 an Avro Lancaster B.1 of No. 550 Squadron RAF went missing on a flight from Italy to the United Kingdom with 26 on board.
- On 2 October KH219 a Consolidated Liberator GR.6 of No. 203 Squadron RAF went missing in the Bay of Bengal returning to Singapore on a supply flight, 12 on board.
- On 4 October PA278 an Avro Lancaster B.1 of No. 103 Squadron RAF went missing on a passenger flight from Italy to the United Kingdom with 25 on board.
- On 5 October KG867 a Consolidated Liberator GR.6 of the Czech-manned No. 311 Squadron RAF crashed at Elvetham, Hampshire after an engine fire shortly after taking off from RAF Blackbushe, England on a passenger flight, 23 killed. The five Czech crew were flying 17 Czechoslovak citizens back to Prague. Repatriation by air was cancelled and further repatriation was carried out by sea.
- On 7 October LJ668 a Short Stirling GT.4 of No. 299 Squadron RAF crashed at Rennes, France. The aircraft was flying from Cairo, Egypt back to the United Kingdom when it ran short of fuel. It tried to land in bad visibility at Rennes but crashed into a row of trees, five crew and 21 soldiers and members of the Auxiliary Territorial Service were killed.
- On 13 October KL595 a Consolidated Liberator C.6 of 206 Squadron RAF failed to gain speed on takeoff from Melsbroek, Belgium and sank back into ground, 31 killed.
- On 15 October NJ277 a Short Sunderland GR.5 of No. 230 Squadron RAF crashed into a hill in bad visibility near Tuas, Johore, Malaya., 22 killed.
- On 19 October BZ928 a Consolidated Liberator B.3 of No. 144 Maintenance Unit crashed five miles south of Maison Blanche, French Algeria following engine failure and stall, 15 killed.
- On 23 October KJ957 a Douglas Dakota C.4 of No. 48 Squadron RAF was last seen flying into cloud 20 miles east of Chiringa, India, presumed to have crashed, 14 on board.
- On 5 November 1945 PD383 an Avro Lancaster B.1 of No. 300 Polish Bomber Squadron went missing near Corsica on a passenger flight from Italy to the United Kingdom, 26 on board.
- On 11 November a Short Stirling C.5 operated by No. 158 Squadron RAF was departing for the United Kingdom when it crashed on takeoff from RAF Castel Benito in Libya after the wing caught fire, 21 soldiers and five crew were killed, one person survived.
- On 14 November PW422 a Short Stirling GT.4 operated by No. 570 Squadron RAF was dropping English newspapers at Evre aerodrome near Brussels when it hit an electric pylon and crashed into a hockey club, five crew killed and three girls in the building.
- On 22 November KH126 a Consolidated Liberator C.8 of No. 53 Squadron RAF flew into high ground after takeoff from RAF Merryfield, Somerset, England on a passenger flight, five crew and 21 soldiers killed.
- On 23 November KG520 a Douglas Dakota C.3 of No. 31 Squadron RAF crash landed following engine failure five miles east of Kemayoran, Java in the Netherlands East Indies, five crew and 21 Indian soldiers were murdered by Indonesians.
- On 3 December KH125 a Consolidated Liberator C.8 of No. 220 Squadron RAF lost a wing flying in cu-nim cloud and crashed at Rochefort, France, 28 killed.

1946

- 2 January EE335 a Gloster Meteor F.3 of 74 Squadron dived in to ground at RAF Warwell, one killed.
- 2 January 1946 KH836 a North American Mustang F.4 of 303 Squadron crashed on takeoff from RAF Turnhouse.
- 3 January MG445 an Avro Anson T.1 of 5 Air Navigation School, flew into high ground near Laxey, Isle of Man, four killed.
- 4 January KN363 a Douglas Dakota C.4 of 243 Squadron, ditched in the South China Sea, three killed.
- 4 January KK331 a Consolidated Liberator GR.8 of 111 Operational Training Unit flew into high ground in Norway, eight killed.
- 7 January 1946 PH242 an Airspeed Oxford T.2 of 21 PAFU, flew into high ground, Black Mountains, Brecknock, one killed.
- 8 January 1946 FA703 a Boeing Fortress GR.2 of 521 Squadron, ditched after engine problems 550 miles west of Land's End, five killed.
- 8 January 1946 NG269 an Avro Lancaster B.1 of 202 Squadron, hit tree and crashed into a hill, Normanby, Lincolnshire, four killed.
- On 15 January 1946 KN557 a Douglas Dakota C.3 of No. 271 Squadron RAF flew into a hill in bad weather five South of Marseilles, France, 25 killed.
- On 30 January 1946 KN500 a Douglas Dakota C.4 of No. 525 Squadron RAF crashed after entering cloud, presumed loss of control, 11 killed.
- On 13 February 1946 VB885 a Short Sunderland GR.5 of 302 Flying Training Unit flew into the sea turning in bad visibility near Calshot, ten killed.
- On 27 March 1946 PP103 a Short Sunderland GR.5 of No. 209 Squadron RAF crashed landed at Seletar, Singapore after two engines failed, 13 killed.
- On 28 March 1946 KN760 a Consolidated Liberator GR.8 of No. 159 Squadron RAF crashed at Pegu, Burma after an engine failed.
- On 30 April 1946 FZ559 a Douglas Dakota C.3 of No. 3 Parachute Training School hit the ground at Pindi-Khut, India while low flying, 12 killed.
- On 8 June 1946 KG747 a Douglas Dakota C.3 operated by the Accra Station Flight hit trees while flying below cloud in bad weather 70 miles east of Lagos, Nigeria, 22 killed.
- On 29 June 1946 KJ918 a Douglas Dakota C.4 of No. 48 Squadron RAF went missing in bad weather in Malaya, 18 on board.
- On 25 July 1946 KN585 a Douglas Dakota C.4 of No. 267 Squadron RAF crashed into a swamp 25 miles east of Bassein, Burma, wing had failed flying in bad weather.
- On 19 September 1946 NX690 an Avro Lancaster B.7 of No. 40 Squadron RAF caught fire in the air and dived into ground five miles West of Homs, Libya, 25 killed.
- On 25 September 1946 KN414 a Douglas Dakota C.4 of No. 110 Squadron RAF flew into the ground two miles from Kai Tak, Hong Kong after control was lost in turbulence, 19 killed.
- On 6 October 1946 MW125 an Avro York C.1 of No. 511 Squadron RAF crashed in the Bay of Bengal 100 miles West of Penang, Malaya, 21 killed, cause not known.

1947

- On 26 February 1947 KK120 a Douglas Dakota C.4 of No. 48 Squadron RAF went missing in bad weather on a flight from Changi to Saigon, 12 on board.
- On 8 March 1947 KK122 a Douglas Dakota C.4 of No. 216 Squadron RAF flew into high ground at Ischia, Italy in bad visibility.
- On 18 March 1947 MW198 an Avro York C.1 of No. 51 Squadron RAF had an engine fail on takeoff, lost height and hit trees 2 miles North of Negombo, Ceylon, 11 killed.

1948

- On 30 April 1948 RF474 an Avro Lincoln B.2 of No. 9 Squadron RAF broke up in cu-nim cloud and crashed at Verquires, Bouches-du-Rhone, France, 11 killed.
- On 4 July 1948 MW428 an Avro York C.1 of No. 99 Squadron RAF collided with a Douglas DC-6 of Scandinavian Airlines System which was on approach to RAF Northolt, seven killed on the York and 32 on the DC-6.
- On 18 September 1948 TA507 a de Havilland Mosquito FB.6 of 51 Maintenance Unit stalled during an aerobatic display a crashed just beyond the SW perimeter of Fradley airfield, two crew killed Lt Hedley and Squadron Leader Shaw
- On 18 September 1948 TE808 a de Havilland Mosquito FB.6 lost control during a display at RAF Manston and crashed, two crew killed and ten on the ground.

1949

- On 19 February 1949 VV243 an Avro Anson T.21 of No. 2 Air Navigation School collided with a British European Airways Douglas DC-3 over Exhall, four miles north of Coventry, four crew killed and ten on the Douglas DC-3.
- 9 August 1949 KN336 a Douglas Dakota C.4 flew into the ground on approach in cloud to Salalah, Oman, 12 killed.

== 1950s ==
1950

- 3 January 1950 VV741. a De Havilland Vampire FB.5 of No. 3 Squadron RAF flew into a hill at Arnsberg, Germany, one killed.
- 5 January 1950 FT376, a North American Harvard T.2B of No 7 Flying Training School hit a tree while low flying at Normanby, Lincolnshire, two killed.
- 5 January 1950 VP199, a De Havilland Mosquito B.35 of No. 109 Squadron RAF flew into a hill at Micckle Fell in Yorkshire, two killed.
- 6 January 1950 FX305. a North American Harvard T.2B of the Royal Air Force College crashed during aerobatics new Coleby Hall, Lincolnshire, one killed.
- 10 January 1950 VS287, a Percival Prentice T.1 of No. 3 Flying Training School dived into the ground near Feltwell, two killed.
- 10 January 1950 SM978. a Supermarine Spitfire FR.18 of Station Flight at RAF Tengah, Singapore hit ground on approach, one Thai national killed.
- 12 January 1950 PX351, a De Havilland Hornet F.3 of No. 64 Squadron RAF crashed on approach to RAF Linton-on-Ouse, one killed.
- 12 January 1950 SW363, an Avro Lancaster GR.3 of No. 236 Operational Conversion Unit RAF crashed on takeoff from RAF St. Eval, five killed.
- 13 January 1950 PP624 and RG254, De Havilland Mosquitos of No. 81 Squadron RAF collided off Serei, Brunei while in formation, four killed.
- 14 January 1950 DE689, a De Havilland Tiger Moth of No. 4 Flying Training School, crashed after engine cut in Southern Rhodesia. one killed.
- 17 January 1950 PX388, a De Havilland Hornet F.3 of No. 65 Squadron RAF flew into a house in low cloud in Germany, one killed.
- 20 January 1950 TP319, a Supermarine Spitfire FR.18 of No. 60 Squadron RAF dived into the ground one mile west of Malacca, Malaysia one killed.
- 25 August 1950 KN630 a Douglas Dakota C.4 of No. 52 Squadron RAF crashed into a ravine at Kempong Jenera, Malaya, 12 killed.

1951

- 5 January 1951 VZ449, a Gloster Meteor F.8 of No. 74 Squadron RAF crashed into sea off Norfolk coast, one killed.
- 6 January 1951 EE550 a Gloster Meteor F.4 of No. 615 Squadron RAF dived into ground near Ashford, Kent, one killed.
- 8 January 1951 VV531, De Havilland Vampire FB.5 of No. 26 Squadron RAF dived into ground after losing control in cloud in West Germany, one killed.
- 11 January 1951 VS838 a Bristol Brigand B.1 of No. 45 Squadron RAF caught fire and crashed at Penang, Malaysia, three killed.
- 12 January 1951 VN310 a Supermarine Spitfire F.24 of No. 80 Squadron RAF lost control in cloud and crashed off Hong Kong, one killed.
- 12 January 1951 VF273 a De Havilland Vampire of 203 AFS dived into the ground near Thwaites, Northumberland, one killed.
- 13 January 1951 T6524 a De Havilland Tiger Moth T.2 spun into ground after take-off, Southern Rhodesia, one killed.
- 15 January 1951 RG183 a De Havilland Mosquito PR.34 of 58 Squadron hit trees on approach to RAF Benson, one killed.
- 18 January 1951 RA712 an Avro Lincoln B.2 of 617 Squadron hit two other Lincolns while landing on three engines at RAF Binbrook and caught fire, one killed.
- 19 January 1951 VZ469 a Gloster Meteor F.8 of 43 Squadron hit sea during a low run near RAF Leuchars, one killed.
- 20 January 1951 TG295 a De Havilland Vampire F.1 of 203 AFS lost control and crashed near RAF Dishforth, one killed.
- 22 January 1951 TA701 a De Havilland Mosquito B.35 of 139 Squadron hit ground following a bombing dive at Wainfleet Ranges, Lincolnshire, one killed.
- 24 January 1951 FX307 a North American Harvard T.2B of the Central Flying School dived into ground near Pebworth, Warwickshire, two killed.
- 25 January 1951 VW255 a Gloster Meteor F.4 of 205 AFS dived into ground near Croft, Yorkshire, one killed.
- 28 January 1951 PP107 a Short Sunderland GR.5 of No. 205 Squadron RAF flew into a mountain in bad visibility at Hualien, Taiwan, 14 killed.
- 13 August 1951 PG367 a Vickers Wellington Mk XVIII of No. 228 Operational Conversion Unit RAF of RAF Leeming, collided with a Miles Martinet NR570 over Hudswell in North Yorkshire. An Air Cadet on the Wellington was given a parachute, told how to operate it and ordered to jump by the navigator, Flight Lieutenant John Quinton. The Air Cadet survived, but all eight aircrew aboard both planes died, when their aircraft hit the ground.

1952

- 25 June 1952 VP261 an Avro Shackleton MR.1 of No. 120 Squadron RAF flew into the sea 12 miles off Berwick-on-Tweed following a practice attack on a submarine, 11 killed.
- 8 October 1952 VP286 an Avro Shackleton MR.1 of No. 236 Operational Conversion Unit RAF flew into the sea off Tarbat Ness, Cromarty during air-to-sea gunnery practice, cause unknown, 14 killed.
- 17 November 1952 WD723 a Meteor aircraft from RAF Leeming went missing over the North Sea east of Sunderland. No trace of crew air aircraft was found.
- 30 December 1952 SW344 an Avro Lancaster B Mark III GR of No. 37 Squadron RAF crashed in Luqa, Malta after an engine failure. Three crew members and a civilian on the ground were killed.

1953

- 15 January 1953 TX260 an Avro Lancaster GR.3 of No. 38 Squadron RAF collided with Vickers Valetta C.1 VX252 28 miles South West of Agrigento, Sicily during a night exercise, seven killed on Lancaster and 19 on the Valetta.
- 7 May 1953 WG258 a Vickers Valetta C.3 of No. 1 Air Navigation School crashed into the sea 25 miles West of Hartland Point, Devon, ten killed, cause not known.

1954

- 25 April 1954 WK105 a Canberra B.2 flew into the ground on night-flying exercise 4 miles (6 km) SSW of RAF Marham. All three crew on board were killed.

1955

- 13 September 1955—Hastings TG584 lost control attempting to overshoot at RAF Dishforth and crashed; five died.

1956

- 16 January 1956 WT529 a Canberra PR 7 of C.F.E. dived into the ground at Sudbrooke, 5 miles north of Grantham, Lincolnshire, when a Trim Motor failed shortly after take-off from RAF Cranwell. Both crew were killed. They were the pilot, Wing Commander Robert Bruce Cole DFC AFC, who at the time was commanding the Tactics Branch of the All-Weather Wing of the C.F.E. at West Raynham, and his staff officer, Squadron Leader Peter Needham AFC. Wreckage was taken to No.54 Maintenance Unit (54 MU) at RAF Cambridge and then scrapped following the investigation.
- 1 October 1956 XA897, a Vulcan B.1 descended too low and hit the ground while on final approach to Heathrow Airport in poor visibility. The flight from Aden was the final leg of a round-the-world demonstration tour. Pilot & co-pilot ejected, but four others on board were killed - three members of the crew plus a civilian representative of Avro.

1957

- 5 March 1957 – Sutton Wick air crash
- 17 April 1957 – VW832 Vickers Valetta C.1, 84 Squadron, Jordan, 27 killed.
- 8 July 1957 – de Havilland DH.112 Venom FB.Mk 1, of 60 Squadron RAF stalled and crashed into married quarters at Tengah Airfield, Singapore, killing two women and a fifteen month old child. The pilot died, as did a fireman and a bystander, killed when a fire truck crashed. 8 other people were injured as a result of the crash.
- 12 December 1957 – A Vampire jet crashed onto a barn roof at Marian-glas, Anglesey killing the pilot, Lt Nicholas J. Lipscomb R.N. 1231.

== 1960s ==
1960

- 19 January 1960 - WV664 Percival Provost T.1, 1 Flying Training School, dived into the ground 5 miles from Pocklington, Yorkshire, one killed.
- 21 January 1960 - WF926 English Electric Canberra PR.3, 29 Squadron, flew into the sea on approach to RAF Luqa, Malta, two killed.
- 16 February 1960 - WT334 English Electric Canberra B(I).8, 16 Squadron, flew into the ground following a bombing run close to Nordhorn ranges, West Germany, two killed.
- 30 April 1960 - WP774 De Havilland Chipmunk T.10, Hull University Air Squadron, spun into ground following engine being cut-off for practice during takeoff at Brough Aerodrome, two killed.
- 10 May 1960 - WT321 English Electric Canberra B(I).6, 213 Squadron, hit ground following a bombing run near Varrelbusch, West Germany, three killed.
- 30 May 1960 - XF507 Hawker Hunter F.6, 65 Squadron, dived into the ground near Thrapston, Northamptonshire, cause not determined, one killed.
- 31 May 1960 - XF901 Percival Provost T.1, Royal Air Force College, stalled during a forced landing following an engine failure, one killed.
- 1 June 1960 - XL615 Hawker Hunter T.7, 8 Squadron, flew into ground on night training 13 miles West of Khormaksar, Aden, two killed.
- 10 June 1960 - XE883 De Havilland Vampire T.11, 8 Flying Training School, lost power on takeoff from RAF Swinderby and hit rising ground, one killed.
- 10 June 1960 - XG193 Hawker Hunter F.6, 111 Squadron, collided with another Hunter during aerobatic display near RAF Wattisham and spiralled into ground, one killed.
- 7 Jul 1960 - XD549 De Havilland Vampire T.11, 5 Flying Training School, collided with WJ914 Vickers Varsity T.1 of the RAF Technical College near RAF Oakington, two killed in Vampire and six in Varsity.
- 19 July 1960 - XH617 Handley Page Victor B.1A, 57 Squadron, caught fire and abandoned at Oakley, Norfolk, three killed.
- 4 August 1960 - WZ472 De Havilland Vampire T.11, 5 Flying Training School, flew into ground during spin near RAF Wattisham, one killed.
- 12 August 1960 - XD864 Vickers Valiant BK.1, 7 Squadron, stalled and flew into the ground and blew up at Spanhoe Airfield, five killed.
- 11 October 1960 - XL151 Blackburn Beverley C.1, 84 Squadron, flew into sand during a night time search for a missing aircraft 15 miles from Khormaksar, Aden, seven killed.
- 11 November 1960 - WF766 Gloster Meteor T.7, Aircraft & Armament Experimental Establishment, broke up in three miles North West of Lyme Regis, Dorset, one killed.
- 21 November 1960 - XA825 Gloster Javelin FAW.6, 29 Squadron, flew into a hill four miles North East of Peebles while descending in cloud, two killed.
- 24 November 1960 - WJ759 English Electric Canberra B.6, 9 Squadron, dived into the ground at Tarhuna, Libya recovering from a bombing run, three killed.

1961

- 9 January 1961 - XD431 De Havilland Vampire T.11, 5 Flying Training School, abandoned over the sea 18 miles north of Sculthorpe, Norfolk, following a fire, one killed.
- 13 January 1961 - XG128 Hawker Hunter FGA.9, 8 Squadron, flew into rising ground at Wadi Yahar, Aden, one killed.
- 7 February 1961 - XF893 Percival Provost T.1, 6 Flying Training School, lost control at night and dived into ground near Great Witley, Worcestershire, one Lebanese pilot killed.
- 20 February 1961 - VL312 Avro Anson C.19, TTC Communication Flight, flew into hill on Isle of Man in cloud, six killed.
- 2 March 1961 - XE604 Hawker Hunter FGA.9, 1 Squadron, stalled and dived into ground at Cowden ranges, East Riding of Yorkshire, one killed.
- 2 March 1961 - XL966 Scottish Aviation Twin Pioneer CC.1, 21 Squadron, flew into rising ground at Mt, Meru, Tanganyika, during a supply drop, one killed.
- 24 March 1961 - XE944 De Havilland Vampire T.11, 8 Flying Training School, collided with another Vampire during a formation loop and spun into ground near RAF Binbrook, one killed.
- 4 May 1961 - XG238 Hawker Hunter F.6, 92 Squadron, abandoned after fire warning two miles of Pomos Point, Cyprus, one killed.
- 29 May 1961 – WD497 Handley Page Hastings C.2, 48 Squadron, Singapore, 13 killed.
- 1 June 1961 - XJ765 Westland Whirlwind HAR.2, 225 Squadron, dropped to the ground and caught fire after engine failure near RAF Upavon, two killed.
- 11 July 1961 - XG134 Hawker Hunter FGA.9, 208 Squadron, flew in Mutla Ridge, Kuwait recovering from a dive in haze conditions, one killed.
- 5 August 1961 - XH791 Gloster Javelin FAW.9, 12 Group Ferry Unit, engine blew up and aircraft abandoned in spin over Manga River, East Pakistan, one killed.
- 8 August 1961 - XE579 Hawker Hunter FR.10, 8 Squadron, flew into ground approaching a firing range in Aden, one killed.
- 29 August 1961 - XH971 Gloster Javelin FAW.8, 41 Squadron, aircraft broke up during a formation break at Geilenkirchen, West Germany, two killed.
- 10 October 1961 – WD498 Handley Page Hastings C.2, 70 Squadron, Libya, 17 killed.
- 21 November 1961 - XM266 English Electric Canberra B(I).8, 3 Squadron, crashed into the Grand Western Canal near Tiverton, Devon following an engine fire, two killed.

1962

- 16 June 1962 - XA929 Handley Page Victor B.1, crashed on take-off from RAF Akrotiri, five killed.
- 2 October 1962 - XA934 Handley Page Victor B.1, 232 OCU, crashed on asymmetric approach to RAF Gaydon following engine failure, four killed.

1963

- 2 March 1963 - XM714 Handley Page Victor B.2, crashed following engine fire, four killed.

1965

- 6 July 1965 – TG577 Handley Page Hastings C.1A, 36 Squadron, Abingdon, 41 killed, 1965 Little Baldon Hastings accident.
- 14 July 1965 – WT324 English Electric Canberra B.(I) 6, 213 Squadron, Roermond, Netherlands, 3 killed, crashed following a bird strike.

1966

- 11 February 1966 - XH536 Avro Vulcan B2 from Cottesmore crashed during low level exercises in the Brecon Beacons, Wales, all 5 crew killed.
- 29 June 1966 - XM716 Handley Page Victor B.2, aircraft broke up in flight during display over RAF Wyton, four killed.

1967

- 6 November 1967 - WL786 Avro Shackleton MR2 from Gan to Changi crashed into the Indian Ocean. 8 killed. 3 survivors rescued by HMS Ajax
- 21 December 1967 – XF702, Avro Shackleton MR.3, 206 Squadron, Inverness, 13 killed.

1968

- 19 April 1968 – WB833, Avro Shackleton MR.2, 204 Squadron, Argyll, 11 killed.
- 7 May 1968 – XR133, Armstrong Whitworth Argosy C.1, 267 Squadron, Libya, 11 killed.
- 19 August 1968 - XH646 Handley Page Victor K.1, 214 Squadron, mid-air collision with Canberra B(I).6 WT325 near Holt, Norfolk. Four killed in Victor, three killed in Canberra.

1969

- 15 April 1969 - A7-020, Macchi CA30-20 6394, during low-level training mission, crashed in paddock beside Springberg Lane, Perry Bridge Vic AU; two died.

== 1970s ==
1970

- 3 January 1970 - XR997 a HS Gnat T.1 of 4 FTS dived into the ground on take-off from RAF Valley, Wales, two killed.
- 4 March 1970 - XS918 an EE Lighting F.6 caught fire and was abandoned over the sea close to RAF Leuchars, Scotland, one killed.
- 19 March 1970 - XE596 a Hawker Hunter FR.10 of 229 OCU, dived into the ground in bad weather, one killed.
- 30 April 1970 - XP556 a Hunting Jet Provost T.4 of the Royal Air Force College flew into ground while on approach to RAF Cranwell, England, one killed.
- 1 May 1970 - WJ632 an EE Canberra TT.18 of the A&AEE abandoned over the sea off Dorset, two killed.
- 26 May 1970 - XR767 an EE Lighting F.6 of 74 Squadron flew into the sea in the Straits of Malacca, one killed.
- 13 July 1970 - WK575 a DHC Chipmunk T.10 from RAF Wyton stalled and crashed near Laxfield in Suffolk, one killed.
- 27 July 1970 - WH641 an EE Canberra B.2 of 85 Squadron dived into the ground on approach to RAF Wattisham, two killed.
- 27 July 1970 - XS930 an EE Lightning F.6 of 74 Squadron stalled and crashed on takeoff from RAF Tengah, Singapore, pilot killed and two on the ground.
- 8 September 1970 - XS894 an EE Lightning F.6 of 5 Squadron flew into the sea of Flamborough Head, Yorkshire, one United States Air Force pilot killed.
- 12 November 1970 - XR510 a Westland Wessex HC.2 of Helicopter Operational Conversion Flight RAF crashed after the rotor hit Wessex XT679, three killed.
- 12 November 1970 - XT679 a Westland Wessex HC.2 of Helicopter Operational Conversion Flight RAF crashed after being hit by the rotor of XR510, two killed.
- 20 November 1970 - XL112 a Westland Whirlwind HAR.10 of 202 Squadron, lost control in fog, four killed.
- 15 December 1970 - XM267 an EE Canberra B(I)8 of 3 Squadron, lost power and rolled over into the ground at RAF Akrotiri, Cyprus, three killed.

1971

- 9 October 1971 - XG156 Hawker Hunter FGA9, 79 Squadron, 229 OCU RAF. Landed at Gibraltar with a main wheel retracted, ran off the runway hitting underside on concrete blocks, causing ejection seat deployment. Pilot Killed.
- 9 November 1971 – XV216, Lockheed Hercules C.1, 24 Squadron, Pisa, Italy, 53 killed.

1972

- 8 April 1972 - XS609 Hawker Siddley Andover HS780 46 sqn carrying RAF Falcons Display team, crashed during take off, Sienna Italy, 4 killed, 19 survived, a/c destroyed.

1973

- 10 May 1973 – XL230 Handley Page Victor S.R.2, 543 Squadron, crashed on practice asymmetric approach to RAF Wyton, five killed.

1975

- 24 March 1975 – XH618 Handley Page Victor K.1A, crashed following mid-air collision with a Buccaneer during a simulated refuelling. Three killed.
- 14 October 1975 – XM645 Avro Vulcan B.2, exploded and crashed over Żabbar after an aborted landing at RAF Luqa, Malta. Five crew and one bystander on the ground killed.

1977

- 29 July 1977 - "XX148" SEPECAT Jaguar T2 crashed inverted during a simulated attack about 1 mile to the east of Whittingham near Alnwick in Northumberland. Both crew were killed attempting to eject just before impact.<I was official photography at the crash scene from RAF Boulmer
- 31 October 1977 - XV348 - Buccaneer Smk2 - hit 3 power cables stretching 2.5miles across Glomfjold (approximately 60 miles south of Bodo Norway). Pilot killed, navigator survived after ejecting.

1978

- 1 June 1978 – XN598 Hunting Jet Provost T3A crashed into Gouthwaite Reservoir in North Yorkshire, England. The pilot did not eject and was killed.

== 1980s ==
1980

- On 7 February 1980 XV345 a Hawker Siddeley Buccaneer S2B of No. 15 Squadron RAF lost a wing due to fatigue during a low level exercise at Nellis ranges, Nevada, United States, two killed.
- On 12 February 1980 XK151 a Hawker Hunter FGA9 of No. 2 Tactical Weapons Unit flew into a mountain on the Isle of Skye while in cloud, one killed.
- On 28 May 1980 XX961 a Sepecat Jaguar GR1 of No. 17 Squadron RAF collided with another Jaguar during a landing break at RAF Bruggen, West Germany, one killed.
- On 11 July 1980 XV418 a Phantom FGR2 of No. 92 Squadron RAF crashed after control was lost formatting with a photographic aircraft, two killed.
- On 14 October 1980 XV792 a Harrier GR3 of No. 3 Squadron RAF unsuccessfully abandoned after it rolled while hovering at RAF Gutersloh, one killed.
- On 7 November 1980 WH667 a Canberra B2 of No. 100 Squadron RAF rolled and hit the ground after an engine failure on takeoff from RAF Akrotiri, Cyprus, one killed.
- On 12 November 1980 XV413 a Phantom FGR2 of No. 29 Squadron RAF crashed into the sea 70 miles east of Grimsby, reason not known, two killed.
- On 17 November 1980 XV256 a Hawker Siddeley Nimrod MR2 of No. 206 Squadron RAF crashed into trees following multiple birdstrike and engine failure on takeoff from RAF Kinloss, two killed.

1982

- On 25 May 1982 a Jaguar GR1 of 14 Sqn flying northwest of RAF Brugen was engaged by a 92 Sqn FGR2 Phantom in a practice interception during which an AIM-9 missile was released shooting down the Jaguar. The Jaguar pilot successfully ejected.
- On 28 July 1982 XX305 a BAe Hawk T1 of No. 4 Flying Training School suffered a failure of the Cold Air Unit, filling the cockpit with acidic gases. While on final at RAF Valley both Pilots ejected. The Instructor survived with heavy injuries, while the Student died.

1983

- On 3 August 1983 WJ265 English Electric Canberra T17. 360 Squadron RAF. Entered cloud shortly after a three aircraft take off from Gibraltar. WJ625 crashed into the Mediterranean Sea 1/2 mile East of Gibraltar. Pilot became disorientated and lost control. All three crew were killed.

1986

- On 13 May 1986 ZA715 a Boeing Chinook HC1 of No. 1310 Flight flew into high ground in the Falkland Islands during a snowstorm, three killed including one Gurkha passenger.
- On 5 November 1986 XS518 a Westland Wessex HC5 of 84 Squadron flew into the sea at Limassol Bay, Cyprus, and sank. The helicopter had been detailed to fly a medical flight at night picking up a pregnant patient from Dhekalia and transferring her to The Princess Mary Hospital, RAF Akrotiri. Three RAF personnel were killed including a Princess Mary's Royal Air Force Nursing Service nurse. The pilot survived, but neither the bodies or the airframe have been located due to the deep waters of the bay.

1987

- On 27 February 1987 ZA721 a Boeing Chinook HC1 of 78 Squadron dived into the ground during a test flight four miles south east Mount Pleasant, Falkland Islands, seven killed.
- On Monday 2 November 1987, six Harrier GR3 of 3Sqn RAF, based at RAF Gutersloh in Germany, were conducting a simulated attack on a target at Otterburn ranges in Northumberland. Nos 3 & 4 collided during a cross over. Sadly both crew were killed. One a US Navy exchange officer and the other from the RAF. The RAF pilot did attempt to eject however the seat was unable to complete the sequence before the aircraft hit the ground.

1988

- On 22 January 1988, XX243 a Hawk from the Red Arrows crashed whilst performing a 'roll-back' at 300 feet (91 m)) at RAF Scampton. The pilot did not eject and was killed.

1989

- In January 1989 XT908 a McDonnell Phantom FGR2 of No. 228 Operational Conversion Unit RAF abandoned by navigator 50 miles east of Firth of Tay after the pilot became ill and passed out, one killed.
- On 13 January 1989 ZD891 a Panavia Tornado GR1 of No. 14 Squadron RAF collided with a German Air Force Alpha Jet during a practice attack on Wittmund airfield, West Germany, two killed.
- On 13 April 1989 XZ359 a SEPECAT Jaguar GR.1A of No. 41 Squadron RAF flew into a cliff near St. Abb's Head, Berwickshire, one RAF Officer killed.
- On 14 June 1989 XX291 a Hawker Siddeley Hawk T1 of No. 4 Flying Training School RAF collided with another Hawk while flying in formation and crashed near Borth, Dyfed, one killed.
- On 20 June 1989 XW295 a Hawker Siddeley Harrier T4A of No. 4 Squadron RAF was abandoned after control was lost during an overshoot from a vertical landing at RAF Gutersloh, West Germany, one killed.
- On 21 July 1989 ZE833 a Panavia Tornado F3 of No. 23 Squadron RAF was abandoned after it lost height and flew into the sea 35 miles north-east of Newcastle, one killed.
- On 20 September 1989 XX191 a Hawker Siddeley Hawk T1 of No. Tactical Warfare Unit flew into the ground on approach to RAF Brawdy, two killed.

== 1990s ==
1990

- 30 April 1990 – WR965, Avro Shackleton AEW.2, of No. 8 Squadron on the island of Lewis & Harris, ten killed.
- 27 June 1990 - WH972, an English Electric Canberra E.15 of 100 Squadron, abandoned on approach to RAF Kinloss following engine problems, one killed.
- 14 August 1990 - ZA464 and ZA545, Panavia Tornado GR.1s of 20 Squadron and the Tornado Weapons Conversion Unit respectively, collided 10 miles from Spurn Head. ZA545 abandoned but one killed, ZA464 crashed into the sea, two killed including a United States Air Force officer.
- 16 August 1990 - ZA561 a Panavia Tornado GR.1 of 27 Squadron flew into the sea 10 miles from Spurn Head, two killed.
- 12 September 1990 XX387 a Sepecat Jaguar GR.1A of 54 Squadron flew into the Solway Firth, five miles off Southerness Point, Dumfries and Galloway, one killed.
- 13 November 1990 XX754 a Sepecat Jaguar GR.1A of 54 Squadron flew into a ridge during a low-level exercise in Bahrain, one killed.

1991

- 13 January 1991 ZD718 a Panavia Tornado GR.1 of 14 Squadron hit ground during a low level exercise in Oman, two killed.
- 18 March 1991 WJ877 an English Electric Canberra T.4 of 231 Operational Conversion Unit lost control during simulated engine failure and crashed at RAF Wyton, three killed.
- 29 August 1991 XX843 a Sepecat Jaguar T.2A of 41 Squadron collided with a Cessna 152 G-BDMD during a low level exercise. The Cessna pilot was killed in the accident and, although both Jaguar pilots ejected, the front seat pilot did not survive. The rear seat pilot in the Jaguar suffered serious injuries.
- 30 October 1991 XV421 A McDonnell Douglas Phantom FGR.2 of 1453 Flight dived into the sea 50 miles from Falkland Islands during combat exercise.

1992

- 9 July 1992 XN976 a Hawker Siddeley Buccaneer S.2B of 208 Squadron hit during a simulated attack on a ship 38 miles from RAF Leuchars, two killed.
- 30 September 1992 XX334 a Hawker Siddeley Hawk T.1 of 19 Squadron was abandoned at RAF Chivenor during practice no-engine approach, one killed.
- 26 November 1992 XW233 a Westland Puma HC.1 of 230 Squadron collided with Army Air Corps Westland Gazelle ZB681 at Bessbrook Mill, Northern Ireland, four killed (including one Army).

1993

- 27 May 1993 - XV193 a Lockheed Hercules C.3P of Lyneham Tactical Wing stalled and crashed anear Pitlochry, Grampian following cargo drop, nine killed including three Army persons.
- 12 August 1993 – XR524 a Westland Wessex HC2 of 22 Squadron RAF crashed into the lake at Llyn Padarn near Llanberis, Gwynedd, Wales following tail rotor failure, three air training corps cadets killed.
- 26 August 1993 - WP980 a De Havilland Canada Chipmunk T.10 of Wales University Air Squadron stalled and hit ground at RAF St Athan during practice non-engine approach, one killed.

1994

- 14 January 1994 - ZD349 a BAe Harrier GR.7 of 20 Squadron flew into ground near Evesham, Worcestershire, one killed (United States Marine Corps officer).
- 2 June 1994 – ZD576 a Boeing Chinook HC2 of 7 Squadron crashed into the ground in bad visibility, Mull of Kintyre, Argyll, Scotland, 29 killed including nine Army and 16 civilians.
- 8 July 1994 - ZH558 a Panavia Tornado F.3 of 43 Squadron flew into sea on approach to RAF Akrotiri, Cyprus, two killed.
- 1 September 1994 - ZG708 a Tornado GR1A of No. 13 Squadron RAF, crashed at Glen Ogle in Perthshire. The pilot and navigator were killed. The Board of Inquiry was unable to determine what caused the crash (though it may have been possible the aircraft was manoeuvring to avoid a bird strike).

1995

- 10 March 1995 ZE789 a Panavia Tornado F.3 of 56 Squadron abandoned off Spurn Head after engine fire and control failure, one killed.
- 1 June 1995 ZG475 a BAe Harrier GR.7 of SAOEU flew into the sea in Solway Firth, cause not known, one killed.
- 2 September 1995 XV239 a Hawker Siddeley Nimrod MR2 of 120 Squadron crashed into Lake Ontario, Canada during a display following a stall at low level, seven killed.

1996

- 23 January 1996 - XX733 a Sepecat Jaguar GR.1A of 6 Squadron crashed and caught fire on takeoff from RAF Coltishall, one killed.
- 13 February 1996 - XX164 a Hawker Siddeley Hawk T.1 aircraft of No. 4 Flying Training School (No. 19(R) Squadron) of RAF Valley crashed just after take-off when the aircraft rolled 90°. The pilot ejected, but the parachute could not deploy in time and he was killed. It was later discovered that the aileron rods had been disconnected when the aircraft was undergoing maintenance, and the procedure was not logged in the engineering paperwork. Subsequently, when it was returned to squadron service, engineers were unaware that the aileron rods were not present.

1997

- 15 February 1997XW225 a Westland Puma HC.1 of 18 Squadron flew into trees during snow obscured landing in Bavaria, Germany, one killed.
- 21 July 1997 XX710 a Scottish Aviation Bulldog T.1 of Manchester University Air Squadron lost power on take-off from RAF Woodvale and crashed, two killed.

1998

- 15 June 1998 ZE732 a Panavia Tornado F.3 of No. 29 Squadron RAF failed to recover from dive 30 miles (48 km) off Flamborough Head, Yorkshire, two killed.
- 18 December 1998 - ZD434 a BAe Harrier GR.7 of No. 20(R) Squadron RAF, was practicing bomb dropping manoeuvres near Barnard Castle, County Durham when the aircraft plummeted into the ground. The newly promoted pilot, who was destined to be RAF Wittering's station commander, had to be identified via personal possessions found at the scene.

1999

- 21 January 1999 - ZA330 a Panavia Tornado GR.1 of the Tri-national Tornado Training Establishment collided with a Cessna 152 near Mattersey, Nottinghamshire, two killed in Cessna and two in Tornado (including one Italian Air Force).
- 14 October 1999 - ZD809 a Panavia Tornado GR.4 of XV(R) Squadron dived into ground at Kearsley Fell, Northumberland, two killed.
- 22 October 1999 - XX193 a Hawker Siddeley Hawk T.1A of No. 100 Squadron RAF, crashed just outside the village of Shap in Cumbria. Witnesses reported that the crew stayed with the aircraft to make sure that it didn't hit any of the houses or the school in the village. However, the Board of Inquiry found that there had been no control inputs during the final phase of the flight. It was also told that the pilot, Sqn Ldr Mike Andrews, was fatigued and working 12-hour shifts to complete paperwork and training for the squadron. The board later determined that the weather and mechanical failure were not to blame for the crash, and that it was most probably down to the crew being distracted by another aircraft.

== 2000s ==
2001

- 9 April 2001 - XW200, a Puma from No. 33 Squadron RAF crashed near to the town of Kačanik, Kosovo after hitting trees during a loss of visibility. The aircraft had just picked up a four-man patrol and on take-off had entered low cloud. The pilot descended to regain a visual of the area when the aircraft struck some trees and crashed. The pilot and navigator were killed, four of the other members of the flight were wounded (one severely).
- 24 July 2001 - XZ363, a Jaguar GR3B from No. 54 Squadron RAF Flew into high ground (approx 5,300 feet) near Eagle, Alaska, during exercise 'Cope Thunder'.

2003

- 22 March 2003 - ZG710, a Tornado GR1 aircraft was shot down over the Kuwaiti desert as it was returning from bombing operations over Iraq. The aircraft was targeted by a Patriot Missile battery when its crew became confused as to whether it was a friend or foe and had to make a split second decision. Two crew (the pilot and the navigator) were killed in the incident. Their wingman Flt Lt James Forbes immediately initiated an attack run on the Patriot site before being called off and notified as a Blue on Blue strike.

2004

- 19 July 2004 - XW221, a Puma crashed at about 10;30 am at Basra Airfield after it was returning from a support mission. The helicopter had three personnel on board, two of whom, the pilot and the crewman, managed to escape the airframe but they suffered serious burns in the ensuing fireball. The co-pilot's body was recovered later and it was determined that there was no problem with his seat harness. The Puma was scrapped.
- 2 September 2004 - WJ866, Canberra T.4 from No. 39 Squadron RAF crashed onto the runway at Marham, Norfolk during a night time touch and go. The navigator ejected but was injured. The two pilots attempted to eject but were both killed when the aircraft crashed.

2005

- 30 January 2005 - Royal Air Force Hercules shootdown. On 30 January 2005 a Royal Air Force Lockheed C-130K Hercules C1, serial number XV179, callsign Hilton 22, was shot down in Iraq, probably by Sunni insurgents, killing all 10 personnel on board.

2006

- 2 September 2006 - XV230, Hawker Siddeley Nimrod MR2 of No. 120 Squadron explodes over Afghanistan whilst supporting NATO operations, killing all 14 personnel on board.

2007

- 8 August 2007 - ZA934, a Puma helicopter of No. 33 Squadron, RAF Benson, crashed into a field near to Hudswell Grange, Catterick Training Area (CTA) whilst on a troop transfer flight. The Board of Inquiry (BoI) determined that the helicopter's crew had been flying at dangerously low levels, involving one incident whereby they all conspired to not report the fact that they were only 35 feet (11 m) above ground level (AGL). The aircraft had just picked up 8 troops from the Royal Regiment of Scotland and was performing a fly-over of other troops in the regiment and then went into a turn that neither pilot was qualified to attempt. The Puma crashed into a field when its tail hit the ground coming out of the manoeuvre causing the entire airframe to hit the ground. The aircraft tumbled and the cockpit canopy sheared off completely. The pilot, crewman and one of the troops were killed. The other eight occupants were injured, some severely.
- 14 November 2007 - ZA554 a Tornado GR4 aircraft was on a routine flight being crewed by BAE Systems staff over Norfolk in England, when, during a Negative g roll, the rear seat occupant fell out of the aircraft. The aircraft was being tested in readiness to be handed back to operational service after a lengthy maintenance programme, and the negative-g roll was used as a 'loose articles' check. The rear seat, which in normal service holds the Weapons System Operator (WSO) fell out through the canopy and was struck instantaneously by the tail-fin of the aircraft as it was travelling at 450 miles per hour (720 km/h). The Board of Inquiry later determined that the main causal factor was that the seat had not been affixed to the aircraft properly. The WSO suffered fatal injuries when the seat came into contact with the tail-fin. The seat plummeted down to earth and landed near to South Creake; the pilot was unhurt and managed to recover the aircraft back to RAF Marham (its point of origin).

2009

- 2 July 2009 - ZE982, a Tornado F3 aircraft (of No. 43 Squadron RAF) from RAF Leuchars, crashed into a hillside at Glen Kinglas, 1,198 feet (365 m) above sea level. The other aircraft in the sortie had to manoeuvre to avoid the resultant fireball and was able to safely return to RAF Leuchars. The investigation held by the RAF concluded that the Tornado had a Controlled Flight Into Terrain (CFIT) due to insufficient turning room in the valley to execute the desired pass the aircraft was taking. The second aircraft experienced a Controlled Flight Towards Terrain (CFTT), but the fireball from the crash of ZE982 alerted the pilot to the danger and the pilot was able to compensate for this.

== 2010s ==
2011

- 20 August 2011 - XX179, a Red Arrows Hawk T.1 was flying as part of a display at Bournemouth Air Festival. The team were 'recovering' (flying back to) Bournemouth Airport when XX179 crashed into a field near to the River Stour, killing its pilot, Flt Lt Jon Egging. An investigation determined that Egging had experienced A-Loc (Almost Loss of Consciousness) due to the g-force that the aircraft was pulling and he was unable to recover from a gradual descent into fields, despite warnings radioed by his teammates.
- 8 November 2011 - XX177, a Red Arrows Hawk T.1 was going through pre-flight checks at the squadron's home base of RAF Scampton in Lincolnshire when the ejection seat initiated. The seat's main parachute did not deploy and the pilot, Flt Lt Sean Cunningham, died upon impact with the ground.

2012

- 3 July 2012 - Two Tornado GR4 aircraft, ZD743 and ZD812 (both of No. 15 Squadron RAF), collided over the Moray Firth near to the village of Helmsdale. ZD743 was returning south via the bombing range at RAF Tain and was holding in a circular anti-clockwise pattern whilst awaiting clearance to get onto the range (a USAF F-15 Eagle aircraft was already occupying the range). ZD812 had taken off from RAF Lossiemouth and was going north to RAF Tain also and was awaiting clearance for the range but was in a clockwise pattern over the Moray Firth. ZD812 was given clearance to access the range and had begun its manoeuvre when the two aircraft collided at 12:01:03 Zulu time (BST-1) over the Moray Firth. The crew of ZD812 ejected and the WSO was successfully rescued, but with serious injury by a Sea King helicopter that was scrambled from RAF Lossiemouth. The pilot died. The crew of ZD743 did not eject and both died.

2015

- 11 October 2015 - XW229, a Puma (with personnel from No. 33 and No. 230 Squadron, both based at RAF Benson) crashed in the NATO Resolute Headquarters in Kabul, Afghanistan. The helicopter was attempting to land when it struck a fibre-optic cable connected to an Aerostat (observation balloon) which brought it down to the ground. Nine service personnel were aboard; five were killed outright, with the rest suffering major injuries. The dead included two RAF crew, one USAF serviceman and one civilian contractor of dual French/British nationality.

2018

- 20 March 2018 - Hawk T1 XX204 aircraft on the Red Arrows team crashed shortly after takeoff at RAF Valley at about 1:30 pm. The pilot was treated for non-life-threatening injuries after ejecting from the plane. The passenger, the leader of the Red Arrows' dye team, was killed.

== 2020s ==
2024

- 25 May 2024 - Supermarine Spitfire LF Mk.IXe MK356 of the Battle of Britain Memorial Flight crashed shortly after takeoff in a field off Langrick Road, to the east of RAF Coningsby, the aircraft's base. The sole pilot, Squadron Leader Mark Long, was killed in the accident. He had been a pilot with the team for four years, and was set to become Officer Commanding BBMF in October 2024. Along with a BBMF Hawker Hurricane, the aircraft was due to display at the Lincolnshire Aviation Heritage Centre in East Kirkby, Lincolnshire as a part of the centre's "Lanc, Tank and Military Machines" event.
