= Martin-Baker Mk.8 =

British ejection seat

Mk.8
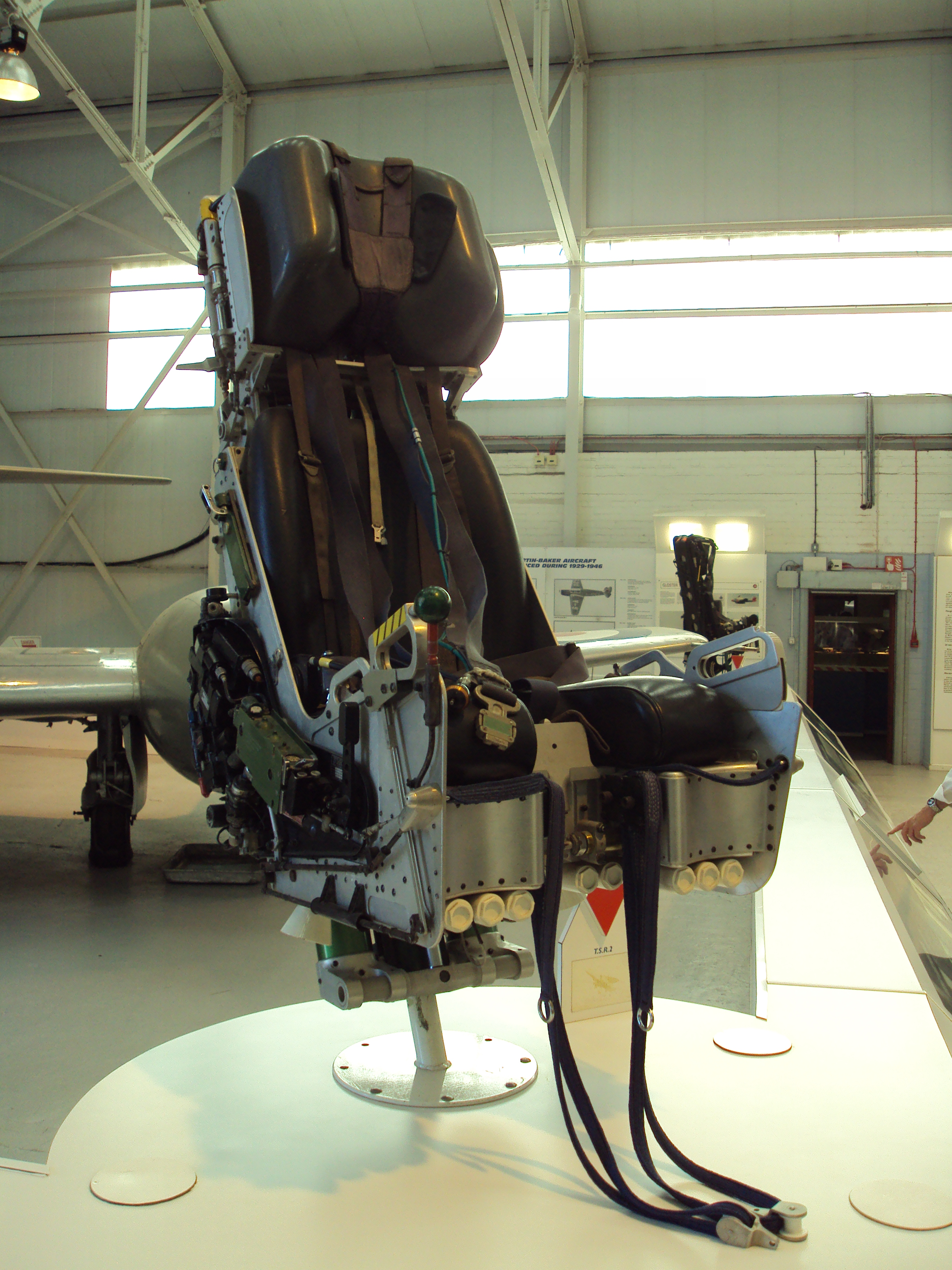
- Original Martin-Baker Mk.8 on display at the Royal Air Force Museum Cosford

Martin-Baker Mk.8 is the designation given to two distinct British ejection seat types designed and built by Martin-Baker. The original use applies to a seat developed for the cancelled BAC TSR-2 strike aircraft project of the 1960s, re-use of the designation applies to a lightweight version of the Martin-Baker Mk.10 seat for the Short Tucano and other similar military training aircraft.

== History ==
=== Mk.8 for TSR-2 ===
The original Mk.8 seat was developed in the 1960s for the TSR-2, produced in small quantities it provided valuable experience that was carried forward to the Mk.9 and Mk.10 designs.

=== Mk.8 (modern use) ===
The current ejection seat design is effectively a Mk.10 seat with the rocket pack removed. It is used in the FMA IA 63 Pampa and Short Tucano training aircraft.

== Operation sequence (Current Mk.8) ==
Operating the seat pan firing handle initiates firing of the canopy miniature detonating cord which shatters the canopy, the main gun located at the rear of the seat then fires, the main gun is a telescopic tube with two explosive charges that fire in sequence. As the seat moves up its guide rails an emergency oxygen supply is activated and personal equipment tubing and communication leads are automatically disconnected, leg and arm restraints also operate.

As the seat moves further up and out of the aircraft the rocket pack is fired by a lanyard attached to the cockpit floor. A steel rod, known as the drogue gun, is fired and extracts two small parachutes to stabilise the seat's descent path. A barostatic mechanism prevents the main parachute from opening above an altitude of 8,000 ft (2,400 m) A time delay mechanism operates the main parachute below this altitude in conjunction with another device to prevent the parachute opening at high speed. The seat then separates from the occupant for a normal parachute descent, a manual separation handle is provided should the automatic system fail.

== Seats on display ==
An original Martin-Baker Mk.8 is on static display at the Royal Air Force Museum Cosford in proximity to the preserved TSR-2.

== Specifications (Mk.AU8LD) ==
- Maximum operating height: 50,000 ft (15,240 m)
- Minimum operating height: Ground level
- Minimum operating speed: 70 knots indicated airspeed (KIAS)
- Maximum operating speed: 600 KIAS
