= Martin-Baker Mk.10 =

British ejection seat

Mk.10
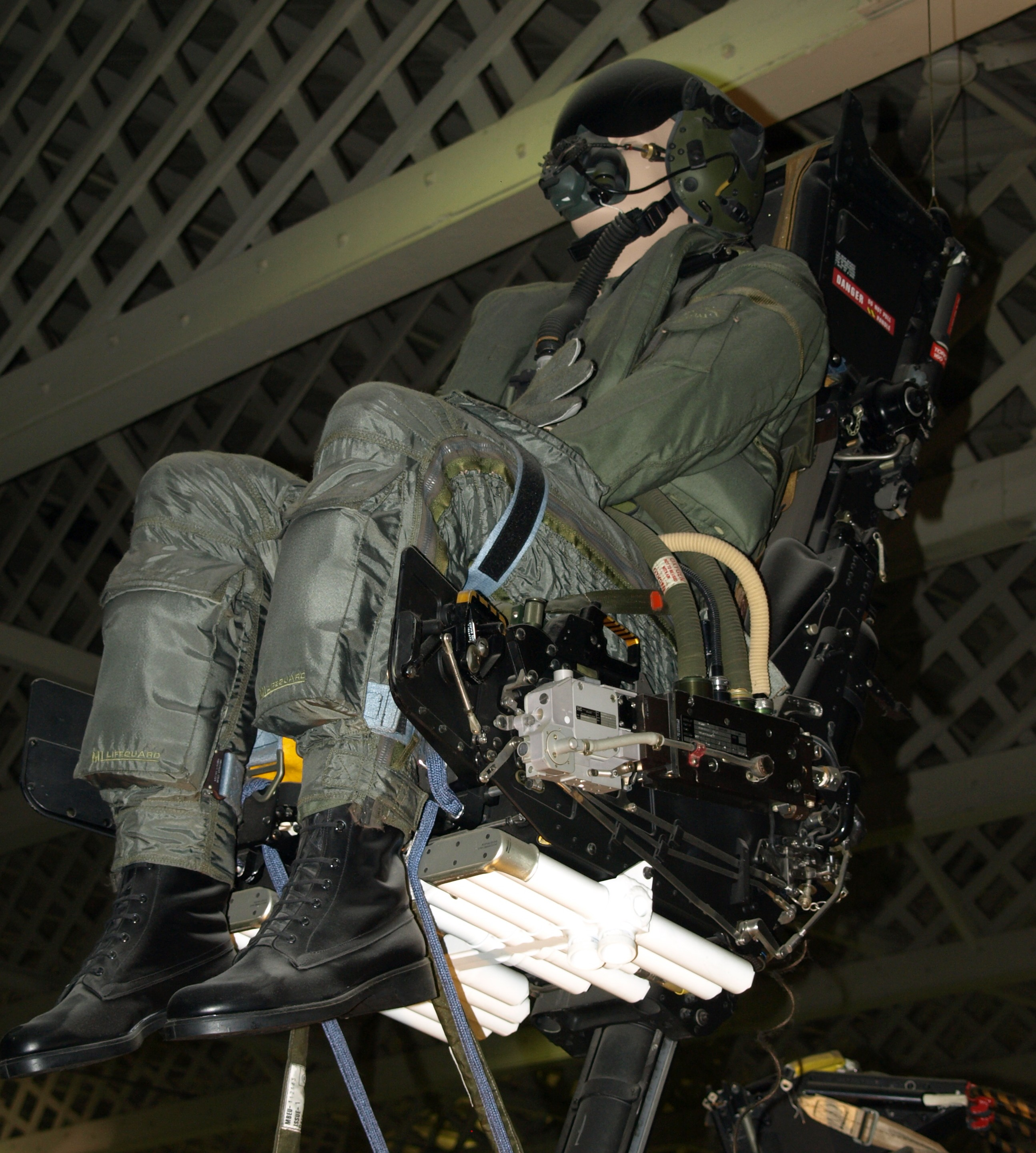
- Martin-Baker Mk.10LE on display at the Royal Air Force Museum London

The Martin-Baker Mk.10 is a British rocket-assisted ejection seat designed and built by Martin-Baker. Introduced in the 1970s, the zero-zero capable Mk.10 has been installed in many combat aircraft types. A lightweight version is known as the Mk.10L.

== History ==
The Mk.10 seat is a development of the Mk.9. Like the Mk.9 it features only one firing handle (the face blind handle being deleted), use of the explosive gas system was extended to operate the drogue gun and harness release system. Arm restraint lines and command ejection capability were new additions. For ease of maintenance the Mk.10 was designed with modular assemblies, avoiding the need to remove the whole seat from the aircraft for minor servicing tasks.

The first successful emergency use of a Mk.10 seat involved a Red Arrows BAE Hawk on 17 May 1980 after the aircraft struck the mast of a yacht moored offshore at Brighton. A fatal accident involving the Red Arrows in November 2011 resulted in the temporary grounding of Royal Air Force aircraft fitted with Mk.10 seats.

== Operation sequence ==
Operating the seat pan firing handle initiates firing of the canopy miniature detonating cord, the main gun located at the rear of the seat then fires, the main gun is a telescopic tube with two pairs of explosive charges that fire in sequence. As the seat moves up its guide rails an emergency oxygen supply is activated and personal equipment tubing and communication leads are automatically disconnected, leg and arm restraints also operate.

As the seat moves further up and out of the aircraft the rocket pack is fired by a telescopic static rod attached to the main gun which remains attached to the aircraft after the ejection seat separates. A steel rod, known as the drogue gun, is fired and extracts two small parachutes to stabilise the seat's descent path. A barostatic mechanism prevents the main parachute from opening above an altitude of 16,000 ft (5,000 m) A time delay mechanism operates the main parachute below this altitude in conjunction with another device to prevent the parachute opening at high speed. The seat then separates from the occupant for a normal parachute descent, a manual separation handle is provided should the automatic system fail.

== Applications ==
By 1989 the Mk.10 ejection seat had been installed in 28 different aircraft types worldwide:
List from Martin-Baker.

- Aermacchi MB-339
- Aermacchi S-211
- AMX International AMX
- Atlas Cheetah
- BAE Hawk
- British Aerospace Sea Harrier
- CASA C-101
- Chengdu JJ-5 (Chengdu FT-5 for export, trainer version of the Shenyang J-5)
- Chengdu J-7 (export version - Chengdu F-7 / Guizhou F-7)
- Guizhou JJ-7 (export version trainer - FT-7)
- Dassault/Dornier Alpha Jet
- Dassault Mirage 2000
- Dassault Rafale
- Embraer EMB 314 Super Tucano
- FMA IA 63 Pampa
- Fouga 90
- Hongdu JL-8
- IAI Kfir
- IAR 99
- McDonnell Douglas F/A-18 Hornet
- Northrop F-5
- Panavia Tornado
- Rockwell-MBB X-31
- Saab JAS 39 Gripen
- Shenyang F-6
- Short Tucano
- Soko J-22 Orao
- Soko G-4 Super Galeb

== Seats on display ==
A Martin-Baker Mk.10LE, on loan from the manufacturer, is on static display at the Royal Air Force Museum London.

== Specifications (Mk.IN10LH) ==
- Maximum operating height: 50,000 ft (15,240 m)
- Minimum operating height: Ground level
- Minimum operating speed: Zero
- Maximum operating speed: 630 knots indicated airspeed
