= Avro Lancaster PA278 disappearance =

Aircraft disappearance

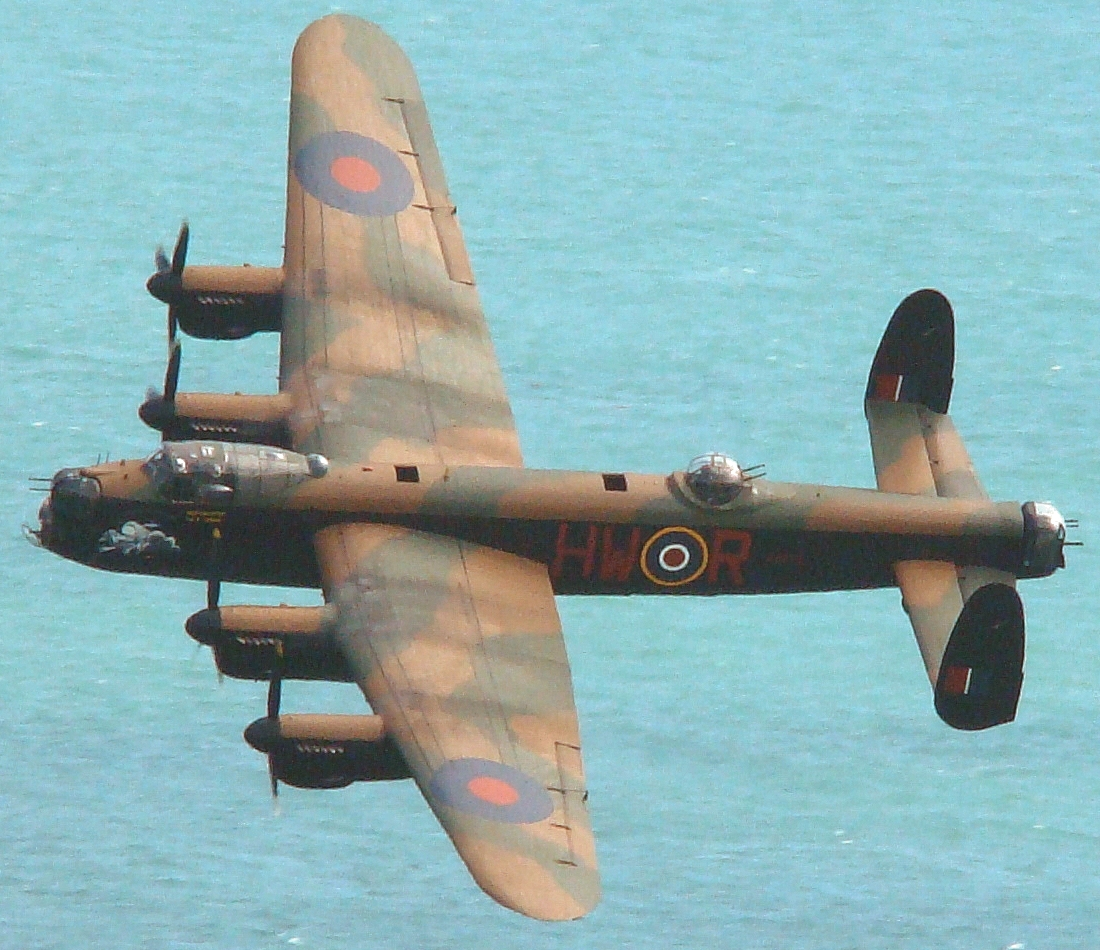
- An Avro Lancaster in flight

Disappearance
- Date: 4 October 1945
- Summary: Disappearance
- Site: Mediterranean Sea, likely near Corsica
- Total fatalities: 25

Aircraft
- Aircraft type: Avro Lancaster Mk.I
- Aircraft name: F for Freddie
- Operator: No. 103 Squadron RAF
- Registration: PA278
- Flight origin: RAF Glatton, Huntingdon
- Destination: Naples Airport
- Passengers: 19
- Crew: 6
- Fatalities: 25
- Injuries: 0
- Survivors: 0

The Avro Lancaster PA278 disappearance involved Avro Lancaster Mk.I PA278, F for Freddie, operated by No. 103 Squadron RAF (103 Sqn) of Bomber Command just after the end of the Second World War.

It disappeared over the Mediterranean, probably near Corsica, on 4 October 1945 with its crew of 6 airmen and 19 female service personnel - the worst loss of female British and Commonwealth service personnel from the Second World War to date.

== Aircraft ==
PA278 was one of a batch of 265 Lancasters built by Vickers-Armstrongs Ltd at its Broughton factory near Chester between June 1944 and September 1945. On completion it was assigned to 103 Sqn of Bomber Command and flew operationally on a number of bombing attacks in March and April 1945.

== Operation Dodge ==
From 3 August 1945, 103 Sqn was one of the heavy bombers squadrons participating in Operation Dodge in which veteran soldiers of the Eighth Army were flown home from Italy and the Central Mediterranean. An embarkation centre was established at Bari airfield, on the Adriatic coast of southern Italy. An airfield at Naples, Italy was also used for geographic convenience.

It was a six-hour flight back to England and normally a maximum of 22 soldiers would be transported home as the internal confines of a Lancaster were not really suitable for passengers. Often the return trip to Italy saw aircraft transporting essential members of services out to Italy.

103 Sqn usually despatched between six and ten aircraft for Operation Dodge several days each week, the aircraft and crews would stop overnight in Italy and return with their passengers the following day or the day after that. Most of the trips were uneventful although squadron records do show that Warrant Officer Francis flying Lancaster B for Baker and Flying Officer Leigh flying G for George both had to land at Marseille in France due to engine failure, on 19 August 1945 and 5 September 1945 respectively.

== Disappearance ==
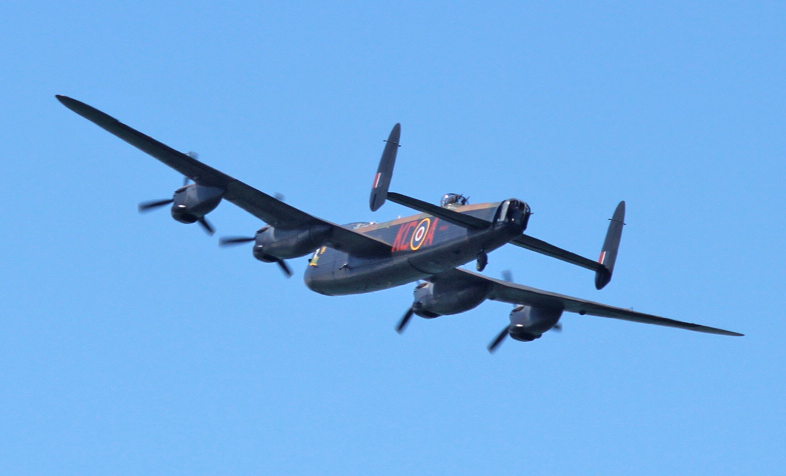
A Lancaster in flight.

On 3 October 1945 the weather was poor and low cloud base precluded flying for much of the day. Eight Lancasters of 103 Sqn were available for Operation Dodge and took off for Italy starting at 23:30 hours GMT. Two aircraft returned with engine trouble, one crew borrowed an aircraft from No. 100 Squadron RAF and took off again at 01:30 hours GMT. Two aircraft, including PA278 "F for Freddie", landed at RAF Glatton near Huntingdon to embark passengers who were commencing service in Italy or were returning from leave.

PA278 was flown by Geoffrey Taylor's experienced crew who had flown together on some of the last bombing attacks of World War II during April 1945, although obviously their bomb aimer was not required and on this occasion the rear gun turret was manned by the squadron gunnery leader Flight Lieutenant John Wymark, who had been decorated with the Distinguished Service Order and Distinguished Flying Cross for his bravery in three tours of duty.

PA278 took off from RAF Glatton at 00:30 hours GMT on 4 October 1945 flown by Flight lieutenant Geoffrey Taylor (pilot), aided by Sergeant Richard Steel (flight engineer), leading the second transport aircraft into the air. It carried its crew of six and was scheduled to fly to Naples with 17 female soldiers of the Auxiliary Territorial Service under Staff Serjeant Jessie Ellen Semark, Senior Matron Gertrude Irene Sadler of the South African Military Nursing Service and Nursing Sister Jane Simpson Annand Curran, of Queen Alexandra's Imperial Military Nursing Service.

The passengers sat in canvas folding seats down the length of the fuselage beneath where Sergeant William Kennedy sat in his sling seat in the "Mid-Upper" gun turret, but no heating or parachutes were available for them and there was no oxygen supply for passengers so the aircraft flew at 2,000 ft (610 m).

The prescribed route was directly across France and over the Mediterranean coast west of Marseille. Flight Sergeant Jack Reardon (navigator) gave the correct course out over the sea but sometime afterwards, approximately 30 miles north-north-west of Cap Corse, Corsica, Flight Sergeant Norman Robbins (wireless operator) radioed the other aircraft reporting some engine problems and advising that F for Freddie would be turning back to land at Marseille. The partner aircraft continued onwards for Naples but noted a flash of flame at 04:40 hours GMT.

Nothing further was heard of PA278 or her crew and passengers and no wreckage was sighted during the air-sea rescue operations. On the outward flight every aircraft reported poor weather in the vicinity of Corsica.

== News blackout ==
Due to the large number of female service personnel lost in the disappearance of PA278 F for Freddie a widely repeated story is that the news was not released to the press until March 1946, although this is incorrect as on 17 November 1945 it was being reported widely in local newspapers in the UK.

== See also ==
- List of fatal accidents and incidents involving Royal Air Force aircraft from 1945
- Operation Exodus (WWII operation)
