= Death of Jon Egging =

2011 British Royal Air Force accident

Jon Egging
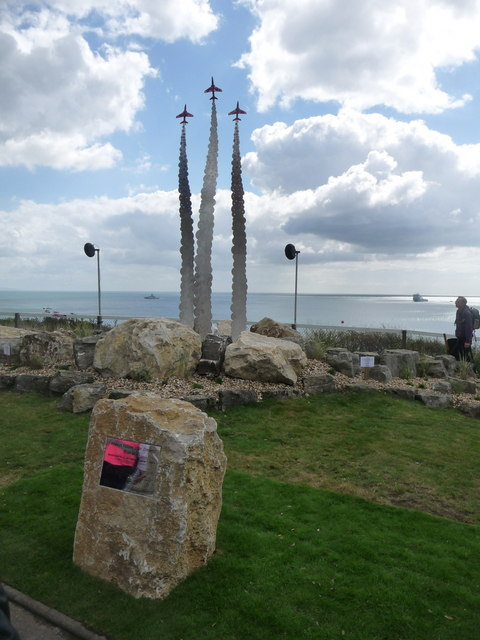
- Memorial dedicated to Flt Lt Egging, positioned on the East Overcliff Drive, Bournemouth (it has since been moved slightly along the road after a landslide close to the memorial)
- Born: 1977/1978; Ufton, Warwickshire
- Died: 20 August 2011; Throop, Dorset, England
- Cause of death: Plane crash
- Occupations: Royal Air Force Pilot, flying as "Red 4" with the Royal Air Force Aerobatic Team (Red Arrows)
- Years active: 2000–2011
- Title: Flight lieutenant
- Spouse: Emma Egging
- Call sign: Red 4

Flight Lieutenant Jon Egging (1977/1978 – 20 August 2011) was a Royal Air Force pilot on the Red Arrows aerobatics display team, who died after crashing into a field in Throop, Dorset. The incident occurred after a display at the Bournemouth Air Festival in Bournemouth, Dorset. It was determined that Flt Lt Egging was incapacitated due to the effects of g-force induced loss of consciousness until very shortly before impact. Egging was the first Red Arrows pilot to die in an aircraft crash since Flt Lt Neil Duncan MacLachlan in 1988.

== Personal life ==
Egging was born in Ufton, Warwickshire. At the time of his death, he was from Rutland, in the East Midlands.

Egging's interest in flying began when he was young, after being inspired by his father, an airline pilot, who would allow Egging into the cockpit for take off and landing.

From the age of 13, Egging was a member of 2028 (Southam) Squadron Air Training Corps.

Egging attended Southam School, Warwickshire, where he gained A-levels in Mathematics, Physics and Chemistry. It was while he was at sixth form that he was awarded a Royal Air Force Flying Scholarship. His first solo flight was in a Cessna 152, out of Wellesbourne Mountford Aerodrome in Wellesbourne, Warwickshire.

Egging later went on to study for a BSc degree in Environmental science at the University of Southampton, joining the University of Southampton Air Squadron. In his second year at university, he was awarded a Royal Air Force Bursary. Flying the Bulldog, Egging completed Elementary Flying Training with the University Air Squadron. Whilst at university, Egging met his wife, Emma, who was studying for a BSc in Archeology. Emma was also a member of the University Air Squadron.

In 2000, Egging joined the Royal Air Force. He flew the Tucano and Hawk aircraft after being selected for fast jet training, training at RAF Cranwell, Lincolnshire, in 2001. From RAF Cranwell, Egging was then posted to RAF Linton, Yorkshire and from there on to RAF Valley, North Wales, becoming a qualified flying instructor on the Hawk aircraft, teaching both students and instructors. Flying the Harrier GR9, Egging served with IV (AC) Squadron, known as "Happy IV", based at Royal Air Force Cottesmore in Rutland in the East Midlands.

On operational duty, Egging flew operational missions in Afghanistan, supporting coalition forces on the ground. He completed exercises in the United Kingdom and the United States, including serving with his squadron on HMS Illustrious, as part of Joint Force Harrier. Here, he flew training missions off the coastline of the United Kingdom. During his last year on his squadron, Egging became a qualified flying instructor, moving to Royal Air Force Wittering to transition to teaching on the Harrier Operational Conversion Unit, in April 2010.

In Autumn 2010, Egging joined the Red Arrows aerobatics display team, as Red 4, with this position "an accolade in itself", due to it being "the most demanding position allocated to a first year pilot", due to Red 4 flying on the right hand side of the famous "Diamond Nine" formation. Egging's "professionalism, skill and humility" were noted throughout his training and displays with the team. Throughout his RAF career, Egging had been assessed as "high/above average". He was described as having an "excellent record of service".

== Airshow ==
The Red Arrows were taking part in the Saturday displays at the Bournemouth Air Festival. Visibility exceeded 10 km (6.21 miles), the horizon being clearly defined and there was a light southeasterly wind. The cloud base was higher than forecasted over the display area, meaning the team could fly their full display. After their display, the Red Arrows performed two flypasts. The original scheduled time of the display and flypasts were from 13:00 to 13:25 BST.

== Incident ==
2011 Red Arrows crash
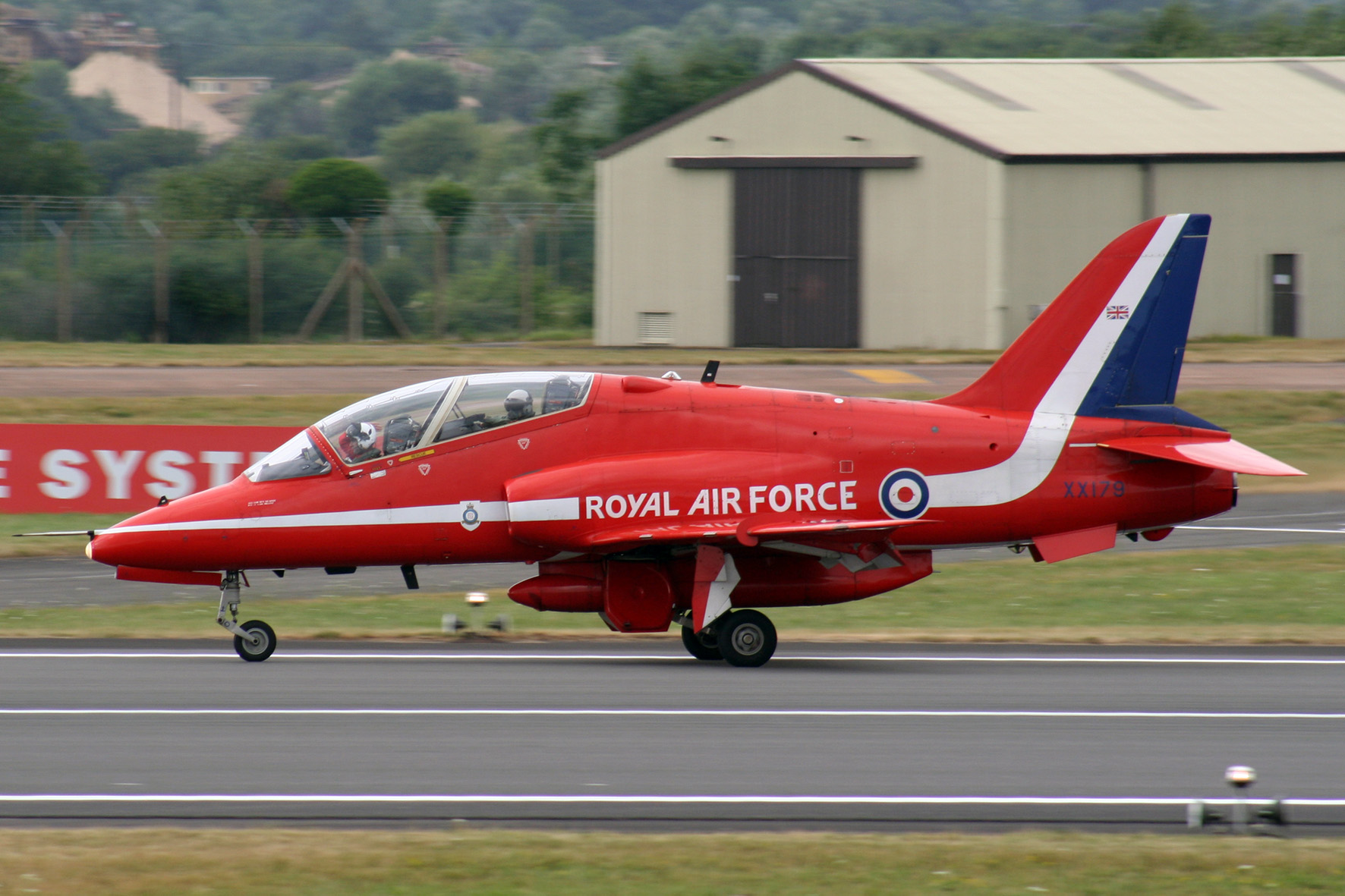
- XX179 BAE Systems Hawk T1A, the plane that Egging was flying when he crashed (photographed in 2010)

Accident
- Date: 22 August 2011
- Summary: G-Force impairment
- Site: Throop, Dorset
- Total fatalities: 1
- Total injuries: 0

Aircraft
- Aircraft type: BAE Systems Hawk T1A
- Operator: Royal Air Force
- Registration: XX179
- Flight origin: RAF Scampton
- Destination: Bournemouth Airport
- Crew: 1
- Fatalities: 1
- Injuries: 0

Ground casualties
- Ground fatalities: 0
- Ground injuries: 0

=== Prior to the accident ===
On the morning of 20 August 2011, Egging awoke at approximately 08:00 BST, completing a 5 mile (8.04 km) run along the seafront and cliffs, with his wife, who had travelled to Bournemouth for the weekend. After this, he went to a local bakery to collect packed lunches for him and the other Red Arrows pilots, before meeting to be transported to Bournemouth Airport at approximately 11:30 BST. Egging was Red 4 and flew his aircraft, tail number XX179. The display went off without any issues, with Egging flying his aircraft normally and without reporting any issues with the aircraft. The radio calls that he was expected to make during the display were made and it was reported that he engaged in some "light hearted banter", prior to the end of flying.

=== Accident ===
Following the display, the aircraft were given clearance by Air Traffic Control (ATC) and began returning to Bournemouth Airport. Initially, Red 1, Sqn Ldr Ben Murphy, flying tail number XX177, had planned to ask the other pilots to perform a "loop" into the landing, rather than a "flat break". However, aircraft involved in the Battle of Britain Memorial Flight had taxied and to avoid the historic aircraft overheating, had a latest take off time. Sqn Ldr Murphy therefore changed his plans, deciding on a flat break instead. Sqn Ldr Murphy later stated that if possible and appropriate, he will provide an advisory call (known as a "hot call") to the pilots to advise them they are "20 or so knots" over the target speed prior to going into the break. However, he did not have time to make the call, but later stated there was nothing to make him realise the pilots had got "slightly above the target speed".

The pilots used a "break" to gather their aircraft into position prior to landing, with Red 1, called for a "flat break". This break resulted in the highest g-force and for the longest amount of time of the flight – the pilots would have pulled 6.3g. Egging, in Red 4, appeared to roll the aircraft normally, reaching an apex at the correct height of 500 ft. However, he progressively over-banked and began descending towards the ground. It is believed that around this time, Egging suffered the effects A-LOC (Almost Loss of Consciousness), where a person with partial consciousness still has strength to control the stick of an aircraft, but is impaired cognitively and functionally to do so. Red 2 (tail number XX266) was immediately behind Egging's aircraft and radioed a warning of "4 check height". It is believed that Egging may have regained full consciousness at this stage, with his aircraft pulling up slightly. Red 2 radioed the same warning, however, it was too late for Egging to avoid a crash and at approximately 13:50, Egging's aircraft crashed into a field at Throop.

Egging's aircraft initially struck the ground with one of its wings, with this striking two barbed wire fences and a fence post. Witnesses noticed that the airbrake was extended after the aircraft hit the first barbed wire fence. With the wings level, the fuselage of Egging's aircraft impacted the ground, with the smoke pod breaking up and the canopy of the aircraft shattering.

After the fuselage impacted, the right wing dug into the ground and detached from the fuselage. The detached wing continued to travel a further 200 metres (660 ft) before stopping. The fuselage of Egging's aircraft went up approximately 50 metres into the air, caused by the detached wing levering the aircraft. Returning to the ground, the nose of the aircraft was down, with the fuselage bouncing along the ground in a linear direction.

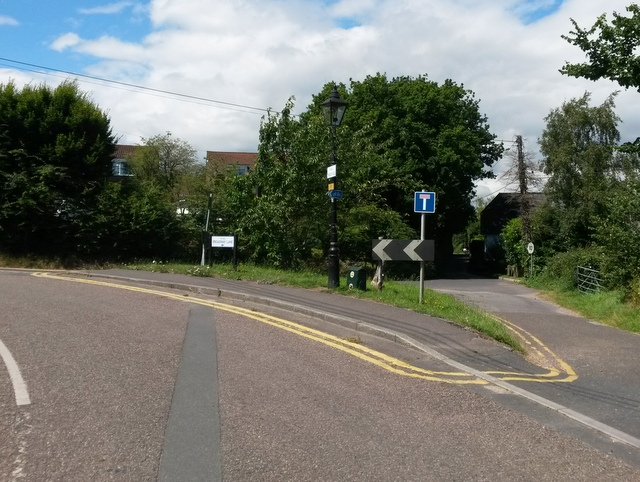
A junction between Broadway Lane, Throop Road and Watery Lane (the road on the right of the photo) in Throop, Dorset. Further along Watery Lane, on the right hand side, is the River Stour and fields where Egging crashed

Egging's aircraft struck trees on the eastern side of the River Stour. The front of the fuselage and cockpit structure were destroyed as a result. Colliding with the trees caused Egging's aircraft to spin and damage the rear of the fuselage. The force of the collision ripped the front and rear ejector seats out of the cockpit of Egging's aircraft and a substantial amount of wreckage was found on the eastern bank and within the River Stour.

Having hit the trees, Egging's aircraft was carrying enough momentum for what was left of the fuselage to travel across the river and resting, upside down, on the western bank of the river. Evidence suggested that Egging had not attempted to eject from the aircraft. He was exposed to a "peak deceleration during the crash sequence in excess of 200g", forces described as "non-survivable", and he would have died instantaneously. Egging had been thrown from the aircraft and his body was found in the River Stour. He was pronounced dead at the scene. Later in the day, Dorset Police and the Ministry of Defence confirmed Egging had died.

== Aftermath ==
=== Crash site ===
After the crash, emergency services responded and cordoned off the area. The Military Air Accident Investigation branch (MilAAIB) attended the scene and began their investigation.

On 25 August 2011, the wreckage of XX179 was recovered to MOD Boscombe Down.

On 31 August 2011, it was reported that Dorset Police were investigating two reports of people collecting debris from the crash site. An eyewitness saw a man carrying part of the wreckage, who made a comment to the witness about putting parts of the wreckage on eBay. Dorset Police warned that anyone taking parts of the RAF aircraft wreckage would be committing theft.

=== Other pilots ===
The Red Arrows were grounded after Egging's accident. On 25 August 2011, the aircraft were cleared to fly, after the initial investigation found there were no wider safety concerns involved in Egging's accident. On 27 August 2011, the aircraft and pilots returned to their base at RAF Scampton, Lincolnshire. On 29 August 2011, the Red Arrows began practicing formations as eight aircraft, compared with the usual nine – this was not unusual, with the team regularly practicing routines with eight aircraft, so that in the event a pilot cannot fly, an air display can still take place.

On 2 September 2011, the Red Arrows performed their first two public displays since Egging's accident.

=== Tributes ===
Bournemouth Council opened books of condolence after the accident. In just six days, 6,000 people had signed them.

Other tributes appeared at various places across Bournemouth, including outside the Town Hall, where 500 floral tributes were left. On 31 August 2011, it was reported that a shrine had been created at the spot where Egging died. It included bunting, flowers, letters and poems opposite to where the aircraft stopped. Another tribute was left underneath the sign at the Red Arrows' base at RAF Scampton, Lincolnshire.

On 8 September 2011, tributes were paid in the House of Commons to Egging. Conservative MP for Bournemouth East, that covers the area of Throop, Tobias Ellwood, described Egging as a "brave man", detailing how rather than ejecting from his aircraft, Egging "was able to manoeuvre it [the aircraft] away from a built up area – an action which probably cost him his life".

=== Charity ===
On 29 August 2011, the third annual charity plane-pull event at Bournemouth Airport featured a plane-pull specifically to raise funds to a charity nominated by Egging's widow. The event was so popular, that the final pull in memory of Egging had to be delayed, due to how many people wanted to register for it. Members of the public pulled a Titan Airways Boeing 737, weighing 33,000 kg, 50 metres along tarmac at the airport.

Tesco stores in the Bournemouth, Christchurch, Ferndown and Poole areas of Dorset held a collection week from 30 August 2011, whereby they collected money for the Red Arrows Charitable Trust. On 3 September 2011, staff in stores wore red in tribute to Egging. The collection raised more than £7,000.

=== Funeral ===
On 3 September 2011, Egging's funeral, with full military honours, was held at St Mary the Virgin Church, in Morcott, Rutland. The Red Arrows cancelled a display scheduled for Portrush in Northern Ireland so they could attend the funeral and cancelled two more displays the following day.

=== Inquest ===
On 12 and 13 December 2012, Coroner Sherriff Payne conducted the inquest into Egging's death at Bournemouth Coroners Court. Eight witnesses gave evidence, including Egging's wife, Emma Egging, a Throop resident who witnessed the crash, pathologist Graham Maidment and representatives from the RAF, including Red 1 on the day of the crash, Sqn Ldr Murphy.

Describing Egging as a "well-respected" and "well-regarded" pilot, Payne concluded that Egging had suffered A-LOC (Almost Loss of Consciousness) and that the accident was "a pure matter of fate on that occasion". Payne recorded Egging's death as accidental.

== Military Air Accident Investigation Branch (MilAAIB) Investigation ==
The Military Air Accident Investigation branch (MilAAIB) led the investigation into the accident. On 23 August 2011, three days after the crash, a service inquiry panel met at Farnborough, to investigate the accident, under section 343 of the Armed Forces Act 2006.

57 witness statement were taken from a variety of people, including eye witnesses, Red Arrows and other RAF personnel. Certain forensic opportunities were not available due to the accident covering 46,000m² and some evidence being submerged or unrecoverable in the River Stour. This included the aircraft nose leg, which was the largest piece that was unrecoverable, having been assessed to be buried in the bed of the river. Other parts of the aircraft were assessed to have been buried within the fields or the river. XX179 did not have an onboard voice recorder or video. The aircraft's GPS was also too badly damaged to exploit the data storage.

The inquiry was completed on 7 October 2012, with the findings sent to Bournemouth Coroner, Sherriff Payne.

=== G-induced impairment ===
The service inquiry found "the most likely cause of the accident to XX179 was G-induced impairment (A-LOC) of the pilot leading to flight into terrain". Amongst other factors, the inquiry found that a possible contributory factor was inadequate awareness about G force in relation to G awareness training.

Exposure to G forces can decrease the blood supply to the brain, meaning vision can be reduced (known as a "grey-out") or totally lost (known as a "black-out"). During G-LOC (G-Induced Loss of Consciousness), a loss of muscle tone occurs, meaning that a person's head and body slump when they are seated. There are two periods of G-LOC – one, where a person is unconscious and therefore completely incapacitated and another where they are conscious, but partially incapacitated, with confusion and disorientation.

Another condition seen following G-LOC is known as A-LOC (Almost Loss of Consciousness). This is where a person is impaired cognitively and functionally, without complete loss of muscle tone and body position seen in G-LOC. As muscle tone is not lost as it is in G-LOC, a person may have the strength to control equipment, yet their cognitive functions may have stopped.

=== Contributory, aggravating and other factors ===
The inquiry looked at a range of factors that may have caused or contributed to the accident alongside G-induced impairment. Amongst other factors, this included the experience of Egging as a pilot, the condition of the aircraft, the weather and environment, as well as human factors, such as if Egging was disorientated, distracted or deliberately crashed the aircraft. The inquiry found none of these factors caused or contributed to the accident. However, the inquiry found there were a number of contributory factors of different strengths. Furthermore, a number of aggravating factors and other factors were documented, that whilst not casual or contributory, could make the outcome of a future accident worse:

Contributory Factors	Probable Contributory Factors	Possible Contributory Factors	Aggravating Factors (not casual or contributory but could make the outcome of a future accident worse)	Other Factors (not casual or contributory but may contribute to a future accident)
The combination of break manoeuvre speed and technique resulting in rapid G onset rate to high G for a sustained period	An ineffective AGSM	Reduction in the effectiveness of the pilot's anti-G trousers, due to the thigh zips not being fully closed (Egging's anti-G trousers were found not to be fully closed)	An initial inability to locate the rural crash scene	The serviceability of the Hawk T Mk1 anti-G system
The absence of clearly defined SOPs for the break	—	Inadequate G awareness	—	RAFAT over-reliance on "word of mouth" SOPs
The 500 ft circuit height resulting in insufficient altitude to recover (if Egging had been 70 ft higher, he may have been able to recover)	—	The failure to deliver an updated centrifuge training facility, which may have resulted in inadequate centrifuge training	—	The RAFAT's approach to low flying over a congested area
The cultural attitude to G resulting in a false sense of security	—	Dehydration resulting in decreased G tolerance (after Egging's morning run and airshow display)	—	The RAFAT's workload
Inadequate occurrence and fault reporting (in relation to g force issues, meaning pilots didn't receive the amount of training they could have)	—	Acute cervical pain resulting in a distraction from performing an effective AGSM (Anti-G Straining Manoeuvre) (Egging had previously reported back pain, which may have limited his ability to perform the AGSM)	—	The RAFAT engineering SQEP and authorisation process, including the ability of RAFAT to ensure that sufficient engineering personnel were SQEP
Conventional 5 bladder anti-G trouser design no longer offers aircrew the best possible protection against G impairment	—	Fatigue resulting in decreased G tolerance (after Egging's morning run and airshow display)	—	The RAFAT non-compliant process of aircraft surveys and a RAFAT post-maintenance independent inspection
Inadequate Risk Management within 22(Trg) Gp and the RAFAT	—	Absence of a "hot" call that may have acted as a mental prompt to ensure that an appropriate AGSM was applied from the outset of the break	—	The RAFAT quality management system
Inadequate assurance procedures within and of the RAFAT	—	—	—	—

=== Changes as a result of the accident ===
Gp Cat David Bentley, the Commandant of the RAF Central Flying School stated that the manoeuvre that Egging was performing when he crashed had been slowed down and that Red 1 must make a "hot call" if he is faster than the target speed, urging other pilots to "take additional caution on the break".

He also added that since the accident that:

- Work was ongoing to ensure that pilots got "the best g force protection".
- Anti g failures were being reported and recorded and better documented.
- Work was ongoing to install a "crash resistant" voice recorder into the aircraft.
- They were looking to get a new centrifuge.
- The importance of recording incidents was now "at the heart of the training" the department did.
- A risk assessment was carried out to ensure workload was "tolerable and as low as practically possible".
- There was a revised command system, which was more robust and closely followed other RAF systems.
- Red 1 had more time to "concentrate on his role as team leader".
- Pilots now couldn't work more than 6 consecutive days.
- Personnel at risk of g force impairment have been identified and extra training that they needed was being looked at.
- The 2012 display was looked at to "identify all the high g manoeuvres", looking at how these could be mitigated against.
- Pilots got a check every 6 months to ensure that "anti g trousers" fitted correctly.

== Legacy ==
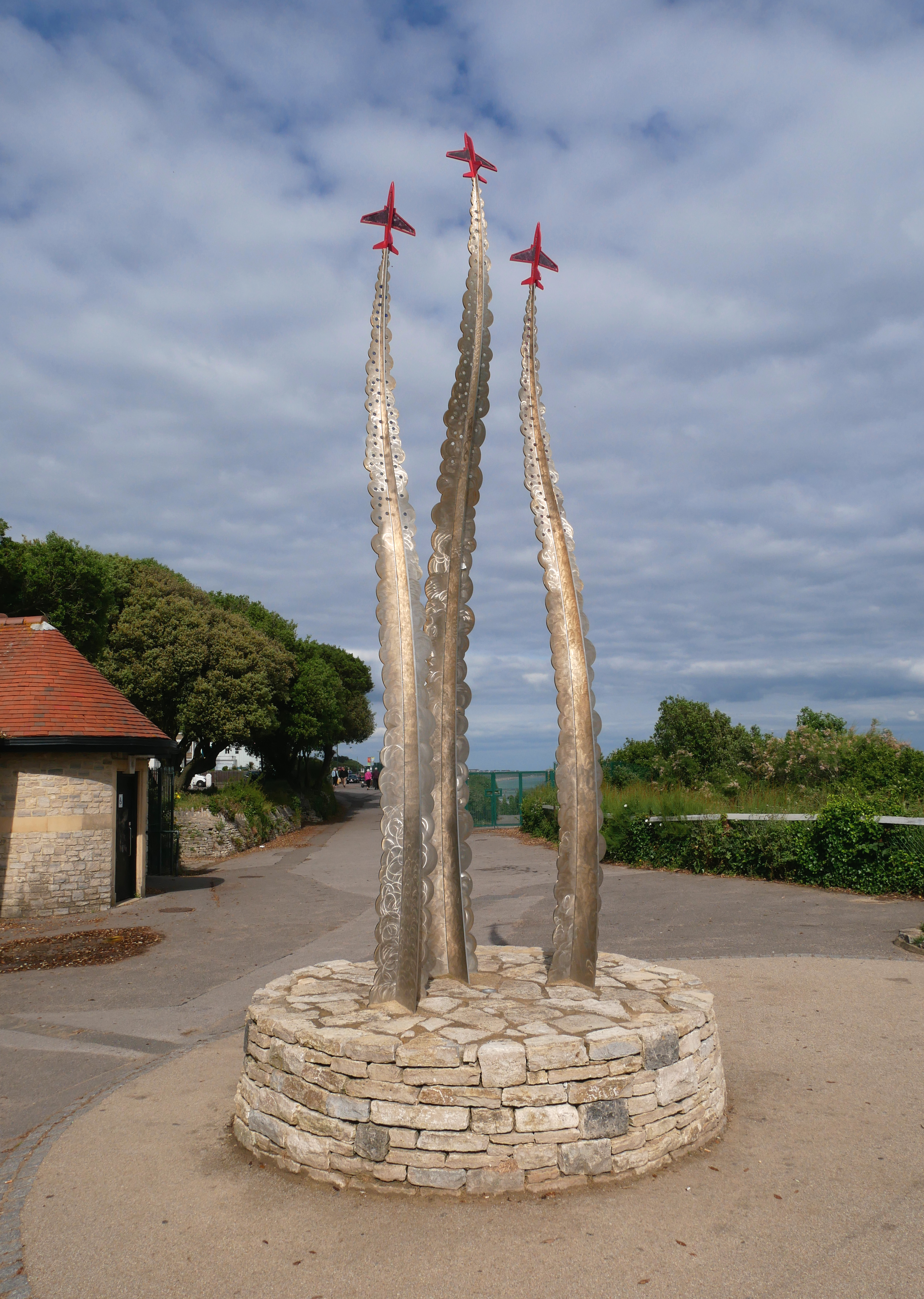
The Jon Egging Memorial, in its new location, after a landslip in 2016

=== Jon Egging Memorial ===
On 22 August 2011, Bournemouth Council announced that plans were being considered for a memorial in Bournemouth for Egging. This followed requests from a number of residents for a permanent memorial.

On 22 September 2011, it was reported that a permanent memorial was to be created at the East Cliff, with plans for it to be in place before the 2012 air festival. Then council leader Peter Charon met with Emma Egging, Egging's mother Dawn, and a close friend to discuss the plans. The design of the memorial would be through a competition locally, with the winner decided by Egging's family. Every school in Bournemouth was invited to submit ideas for the memorial, with 39 schools sending design ideas.

On 22 February 2012, a design was chosen by Emma Egging and Egging's mother. On 29 August 2012, Emma Egging unveiled the memorial at a private ceremony. Inspired by designs from local schoolchildren, the memorial stands at 5 metres high, with three red arrows and their trail smoke.

On 24 April 2016, there was a major landslip underneath the memorial. Whilst the memorial was not damaged, it was left close to the edge. It was decided to relocate it along the East Cliff, to the top of the East Cliff Zig-Zag path. On 18 August 2018, the memorial was moved. Emma Egging and Egging's mother attended the scene, tying red ribbons to the memorial, marking the relocation.

On 20 August 2021, the 10-year anniversary of Egging's death, a plaque was presented at the memorial, with a poem titled "My Future Dreams" engraved on it. The poem was written by students across the UK, through collaboration with the Jon Egging Trust (JET).

=== Jon Egging Trust (JET) ===
In 2012, Emma Egging, along with Egging's mother, founded a trust in Egging's name, alongside childhood friend James Godley, and Red Arrows pilot Ben Plank. The aim of the trust is to "fulfil the ambition" of Egging, to "help young people who are facing adversity to be the best they can be". In May 2014, it was announced that Professor Brian Cox had become a patron of the trust.

Within the first 10 years of the trust, JET had worked with 30,000 children and young people. The plan was to work with a million within the next ten years.

In June 2021, it was reported that Emma Egging had been recognised in the Queen's Birthday Honours, receiving an OBE for her work with the JET.

== See also ==
- List of fatal accidents and incidents involving Royal Air Force aircraft from 1945
- List of air show accidents and incidents in the 21st century
- Death of Sean Cunningham – another Red Arrows pilot, who died a few months after Egging
