= Throop and Holdenhurst =

Civil parish in England

Coordinates: 50.7585°N 1.835°W

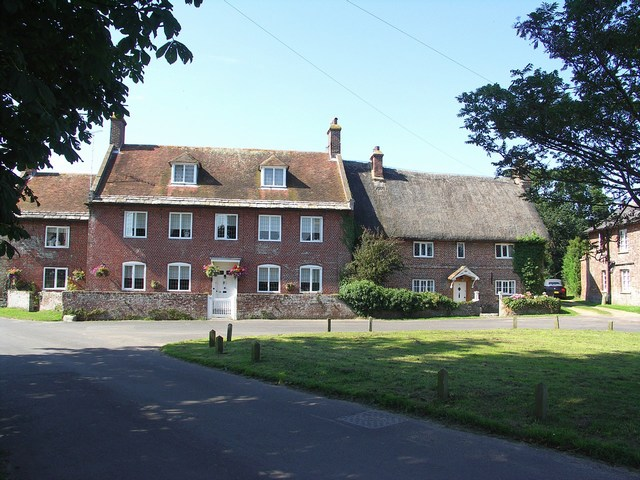
- Holdenhurst

- Throop

- Location within Dorset
- Civil parish: Throop and Holdenhurst
- Unitary authority: Bournemouth, Christchurch and Poole
- Ceremonial county: Dorset
- Region: South West
- Country: England
- Sovereign state: United Kingdom
- Post town: BOURNEMOUTH
- Postcode district: BH8
- Dialling code: 01202
- Police: Dorset
- Fire: Dorset and Wiltshire
- Ambulance: South Western
- UK Parliament: Bournemouth East

Throop and Holdenhurst is a civil parish in Bournemouth, Christchurch and Poole in Dorset, England.

== History ==
Throop and Holdenhurst Village Council was officially inaugurated on 1 April 2021.

== Places ==
- Holdenhurst
- Muscliff
- Strouden Park
- Throop
- Townsend

== See also ==
- List of civil parishes in Dorset
