= Death of Sean Cunningham =

2011 British Royal Air Force accident

Sean James Cunningham
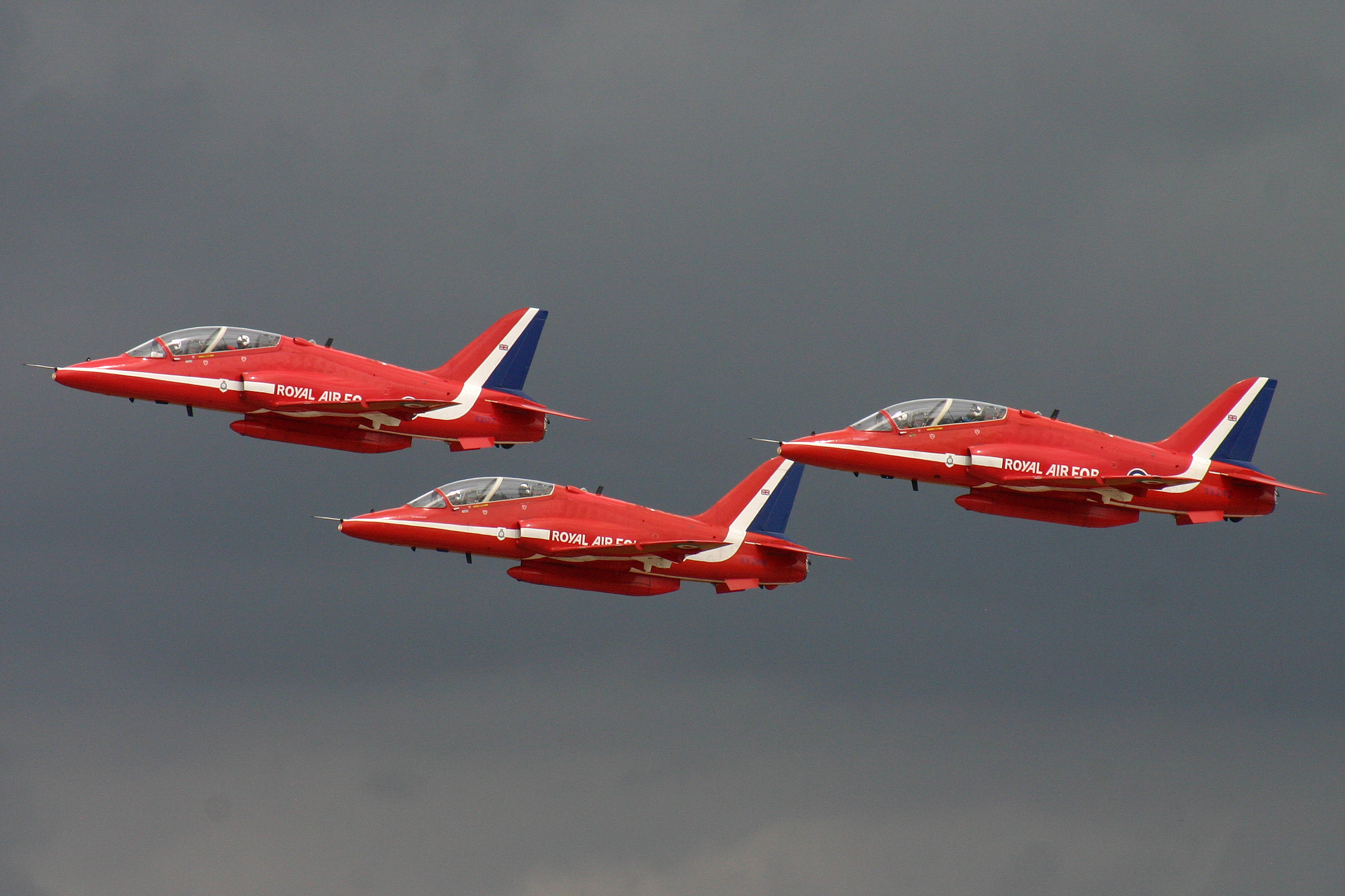
- Three of the Red Arrows departing RIAT 2011. XX177 is on the left of this image taken four months before the incident
- Born: Johannesburg, South Africa
- Died: 8 November 2011 (aged 34–35); RAF Scampton
- Occupation: Pilot
- Years active: 2000–2011

Flight Lieutenant Sean Cunningham (1976 – 8 November 2011) was a Royal Air Force pilot on the Red Arrows aerobatics display team, who died when his ejection seat initiated whilst the aircraft he was in was stationary on the ground and he was conducting pre-flight checks. The incident occurred at the Red Arrows' former home base, RAF Scampton in Lincolnshire, England. The initiation of the ejection seat was assumed to have been accidental. The parachute on the seat did not deploy and Cunningham fell, still strapped to the seat, 220 feet (67 m) to his death. In January 2018, in the prosecution brought by the Health and Safety Executive, Martin-Baker, the manufacturers of the seat, pleaded guilty to a breach of health and safety law regarding Cunningham's death. On 23 February 2018, Martin-Baker were fined £1.1 million.

== Early life ==
Cunningham was born in Johannesburg, South Africa, in 1976. His family moved to the United Kingdom in 1986 when he was nine years old and settled in the Ernesford Grange area of Coventry. Cunningham attended Ernesford Grange School and learnt to fly, gaining his pilot's licence at the age of 17. Despite a promising career in football, after university Cunningham joined the Royal Air Force in 2000; it had been his boyhood dream to fly with the Red Arrows, the RAF's aerobatic display team. He had flown with No. 617 Squadron and No. 100 Squadron of the Royal Air Force before being selected to join the Red Arrows as 'RED 5' in May 2011.

== Accident ==
On 8 November 2011, Cunningham (who was to fly as RED 5), was crewing-in to his aircraft, a Hawk T1, registration XX177, to undertake a training flight and a transit to RAF Valley in North Wales. As the team were out of the display season (which normally ends in September), they flew up to three times a day, five days a week for continual professional training. During Cunningham's aircraft's pre-flight checks the ejection seat initiated at 11:06 am, which resulted in the canopy being shattered and the seat with Cunningham strapped into it being jettisoned into the air. After reaching a height of 220 feet (67 m) the drogue parachutes deployed (one was 22 inches, 560 mm across and the other 5 feet, 1.5 m) which were designed to allow the seat to stabilize itself in mid-air. As the seat fell back to earth the main parachute failed to deploy to slow the descent to a safe speed, and he fell to his death in the malfunctioning ejection seat. Cunningham was airlifted to Lincoln County Hospital by air ambulance, but was declared dead there at 12:14 pm. Cunningham died after what the coroner called "non-survivable injuries" to his brain and cardiovascular system.

This model of ejection seat is a zero-zero seat; that is, it has no minimum speed or minimum height above ground to deploy fully.

The incident led to a grounding of many aircraft that the Royal Air Force were operating at that time, including all variants of the Hawk aircraft. The Martin-Baker ejection seat used (Mk.10B1) was also fitted to other aircraft besides the Hawk, though many were cleared as being fit to fly in the days after the event. The Red Arrows were given their airworthiness back by early December 2011.

The seat did not act in the sequence that it was supposed to; after ejection from the canopy and a ceiling height is attained, the seat is supposed to drop away and a main parachute deploy to allow the pilot to drift back down to the ground. A bolt had been over-tightened which meant that the sequence could not complete properly. It was noted that the initiation of the ejection seat was almost impossible to do accidentally, with senior officers from the RAF at a loss to explain how it happened.

The Service Inquiry into the accident found that the seat firing handle (SFH) safety pin, had been displaced on an earlier flight (4 November 2011) and re-inserted incorrectly so as to appear that it was in the safe position, especially if viewed vertically from above, which is the normal stance when looking at the ejection seat for both aircrew and groundcrew, but actually it was in an unsafe position. As the aircraft was not used between 4 November and 8 November 2011, the cockpit was unsafe for four days. It was believed that straps from a previous sortie had pulled the SFH loose.

== Inquest ==
A pre-inquest hearing was held in August 2013, where the coroner heard that Flight Lieutenant Kirsty Stewart, a fellow pilot on the Red Arrows, had a related incident working as an instructor at RAF Valley. After landing following a training flight, Stewart noticed she had failed to fully insert the safety pin of her ejection seat firing handle leaving her at risk of accidental ejection. Stewart said the firing handle had accidentally been moved to the wrong position during flight by her seat straps, and that she believed the handle being in the wrong position prevented full insertion of the safety pin. The inquest was heard at Lincoln Cathedral Centre in January 2014. This had been delayed due to Lincolnshire Police conducting their own criminal investigation in the incident and passing the case file to the Crown Prosecution service (CPS) who decided that no-one would be prosecuted as there was insufficient evidence to suggest anyone had breached their duty of care.

The inquest heard about the incident and the events leading up to it, including how Cunningham had taken Night Nurse, a brand of cold relief, as an oral suspension the night before and how moments before crewing-in, he accepted a 49-second call on his mobile phone from an estate agent about a house sale. Two medical officers submitted testimony that disagreed with each other about the effect of Night Nurse on Cunningham's alert state. One stated that Night Nurse contains promethazine, which can cause "drowsiness, poor vision, loss of concentration and cognitive impairment". The other stated that it was "highly unlikely" that the dose taken would have had any effect the following day.

Before crewing-in, Cunningham and some of the other aircrew were waiting for the engineering paperwork to be completed and it was stated that Cunningham appeared "in good spirits", and that he was "buzzing with excitement at flying to RAF Valley and an overnight stay with four friends".

The inquest also heard how a squadron leader who had returned to the Red Arrows after being away for four years was surprised by the lack of engineers for the squadron, the operational tempo (especially given the age of the aircraft) and the relative inexperience of the engineers, some of whom were on their first tour. There had also been pressure on the pilots to perform at a greater number of events. For the 2012 season, the number of hours flown had been dropped from 3,000 to 2,500.

The coroner described the safety pin of the ejection seat's firing handle as "entirely useless". Seven personnel had nineteen opportunities to check the position of the firing handle between its final flight on 4 November and the incident, and none of them, including Cunningham, had determined the safety pin had been incorrectly inserted or that the firing handle was in an unsafe position. One senior aircraftman who was working that day gave evidence at the inquest stating that he had confirmed the firing handle safety pin was in position, which meant it was supposed to be safe according to his training. He said "I still believe it's not possible, or shouldn't be possible, for those other positions. To me, an ejection seat should have two settings: safe or in use."

One of the last things that a pilot does when crewing-in before take-off, is to remove the safety pin(s) so that the seat is "live". The safety pin on the seat could also be mis-aligned, which when viewed from a normal vertical downward angle, means that it looks to be in the 'safe' position, but would not be. This means that the yellow and black strap that sits between the pilots legs (the SFH) can be pulled upwards sharply and the seat will deploy. The SFH can also be pushed accidentally into a downward position, so that any amount of downward pressure upon it will allow the ejection to activate.

The coroner was critical of Martin-Baker, who knew about how the bolt that retained the drogue parachute was not to be over-tightened as far back as January 1990. Martin-Baker had informed some operators of the Mk10B1 seat (including many military air forces worldwide) not to over-tighten the bolt, but had not informed either the Ministry of Defence or the Royal Air Force. An assessment carried out by the Ministry after the incident stated that the event would occur only every 115 years. It was revealed prior to sentencing that Martin-Baker had passed this information to MoD before 1990, so had no obligation to do so again in 1990. In court, it was claimed MoD never had this information, from 1952 on. An RAF training film, MoD Air Publications and aircrew & engineer witnesses, proved otherwise; but the Health and Safety Executive advised the judge that this was irrelevant.

== Aftermath and prosecution ==
Martin-Baker have since designed a small metal plate to go over the SFH which prevents accidental firing. This had been proposed a number of times but always rejected by MoD. Additionally they have created a new bolt that cannot be over-tightened and will hold the main parachute in place until the ejection seat is initiated and stabilised. This shoulder bolt had previously been removed from the Mk9 seat design, with the MoD's agreement. Training on ejection seats in the Royal Air Force was changed after this event.

The Crown Prosecution Service (CPS) announced in May 2013 that no-one would be prosecuted over the incident, but that the Health and Safety Executive might pursue a prosecution. In September 2016, The Health and Safety Executive announced that they would be pressing ahead with a prosecution of Martin-Baker under section 3(1) of the Health and Safety at Work etc. Act 1974. A pre-trial hearing was conducted in February 2017, where the company pleaded not guilty. A trial was scheduled to commence in January 2018, at which Martin-Baker pleaded guilty to a breach of the Health and Safety at Work etc. Act 1974.

According to Martin-Baker's solicitors (Clyde & Co) they were advised to plead guilty to 'avoid upsetting MoD'. As part of the guilty plea, Martin-Baker agreed to pay court costs amounting to over £550,000 but denied the prosecution's allegation that what happened was "not an isolated incident". In February 2018, the company was fined £1.1 million.

=== Memorial plaque ===
There is a memorial at RAF Scampton to Cunningham and fellow Red Arrows pilot, Flight Lieutenant Jon Egging. A brass plaque, on a wooden plinth in front of a gate guardian Hawk aircraft, reads "...they have slipped the surly bonds of Earth / Put out their hands and touched the face of God... / In memory of / Flt Lt Jon Egging – 20th August 2011 / Flt Lt Sean Cunningham – 8th November 2011". The wording paraphrases part of the poem "High Flight" by John Gillespie Magee Jr.

== See also ==
- List of fatal accidents and incidents involving Royal Air Force aircraft from 1945
- Death of Jon Egging - another Red Arrows pilot, who died a few months before Cunningham
