= Throop, Dorset =

Village in Dorset, England

Coordinates: 50.763°N 1.847°W

Throop
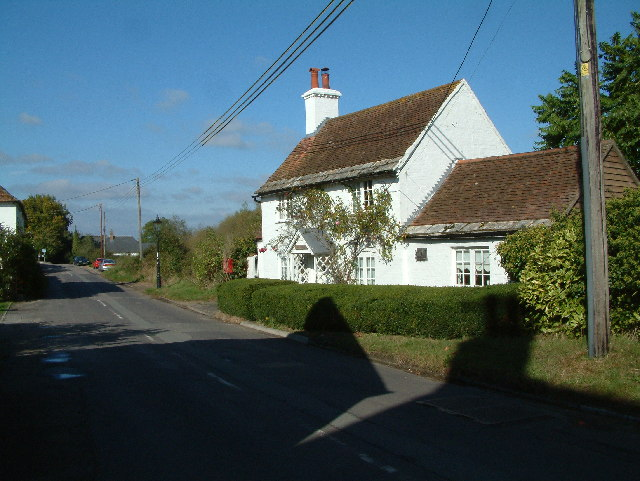
- Vine Cottage, Throop Road

- Location within Dorset
- OS grid reference: SZ10749589
- Civil parish: Throop and Holdenhurst
- Unitary authority: Bournemouth, Christchurch and Poole
- Ceremonial county: Dorset
- Region: South West
- Country: England
- Sovereign state: United Kingdom
- Post town: BOURNEMOUTH
- Postcode district: BH8
- Dialling code: 01202
- Police: Dorset
- Fire: Dorset and Wiltshire
- Ambulance: South Western
- UK Parliament: Bournemouth East

Throop is a village in the civil parish of Throop and Holdenhurst, in the Bournemouth, Christchurch and Poole district, in Dorset, England, situated on the outskirts of Bournemouth. It is renowned for its expansive fishing industry.

== Geography and administration ==
Although within the historic county boundaries of Hampshire, at the time of the 1974 local government re-organization it was considered desirable that the whole of what is now called the South East Dorset conurbation, which includes Bournemouth and Poole, should be part of the same county. Throop is currently part of the Throop and Muscliff Ward within the Bournemouth borough council and is close to the River Stour featuring countryside views over the Stour Valley. The population of this ward at the 2011 census was 8,882. Also in the area is Muccleshell.

== History ==
Throop village has existed for many years and is described in various historical texts relating to the Bournemouth area – in 1842 it is referred to as a "Pleasant and secluded village".

== Notable areas in Throop ==
=== Throop Mill ===
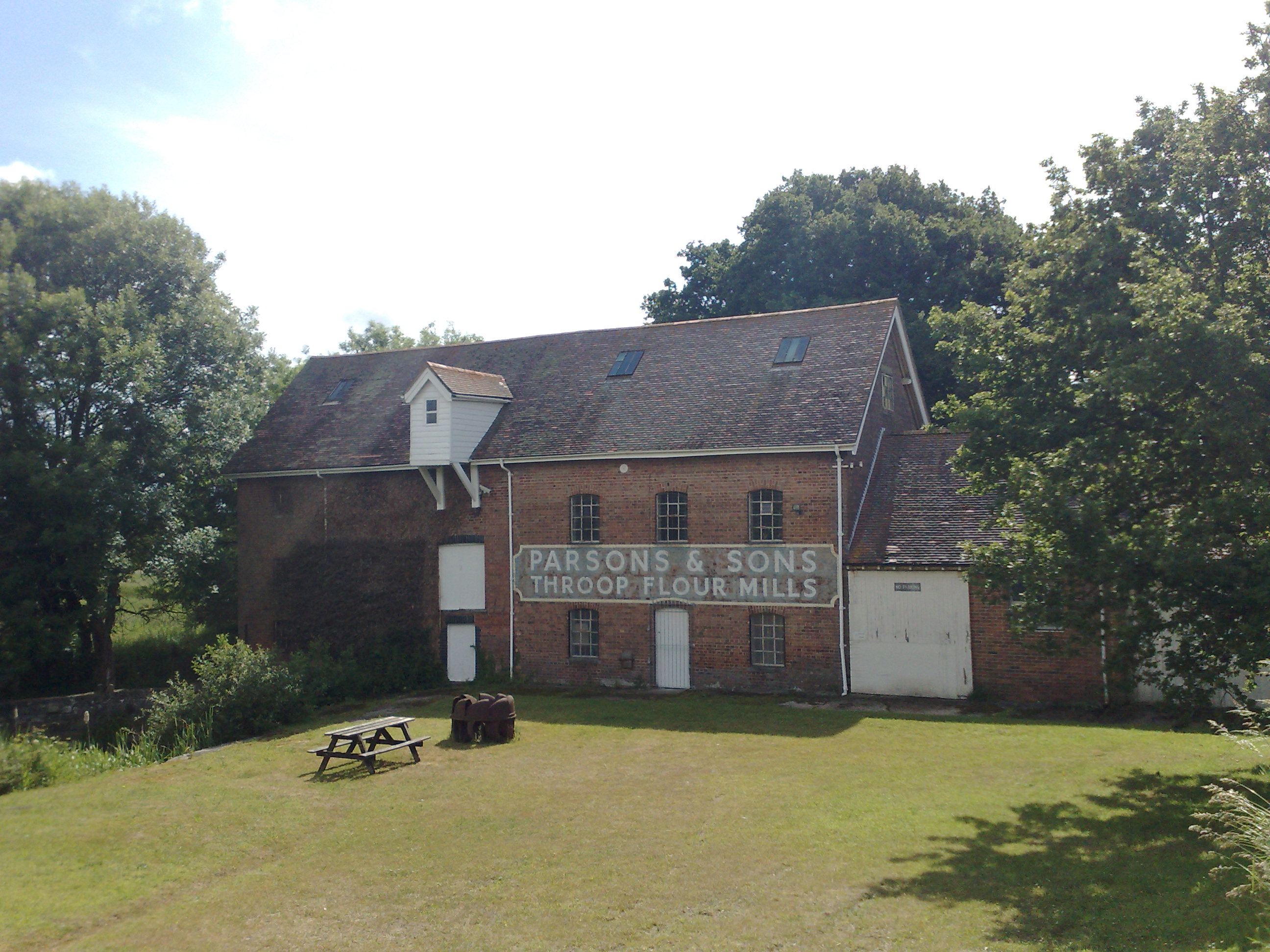
Throop Mill.

One of the main characteristics of modern-day Throop is the Grade II listed flour mill, first listed on 19 May 1975. The building gained its 'listed' status thanks to its sluice gates, with Historic England stating "despite the mid-C20 date of the machinery, the structure is remarkably complete and an increasingly rare survival of its type". The mill and nearby surrounding areas are popular locations for walking and fishing, with several walking routes alongside the River Stour towards Muscliff and Holdenhurst.

The mill in Throop village has been present in some regard since the 12th century passing through various ownerships, including monks from Quarr Abbey. The mill was recorded in William the Conqueror's Domesday Book in 1086, although it is unclear whether it was in its current location or nearby. The foundations of an earlier building have been discovered in the existing mill. The current building is from the late 19th Century.

The most recent owners of the mill when it was still in operation were Parsons and Sons. They used the mill until selling it in 1957. Their name still remains on the outside of the mill. The mill has been closed since 1974, when it stopped operating due to water drying up with the creation of a flood relief scheme further up the river. Although not in use, the early 20th-century milling machinery still remains. Examples of this can still be seen, notably the 50" turbine drove water for mill. This is located on the grass outside the mill and was made by local Ringwood firm, Armfields.

=== Throop House ===
Throop House is a Grade II listed building, standing to the east of Throop Mill. The house was built by Lord Malmesbury in 1804 as the dower house for Hurn Court, a mile away across the River Stour, being the residence of his late wife Sylvia Dowager, Countess of Malmesbury. The building was first listed on 5 May 1952. With river frontage and 3 acres (12,000 m^{2}) of gardens, the house was built in 1804 of the distinctively cream Bournemouth brick. Several cedar trees are the highlight of the gardens. In 1959 Dr James Fisher (after whom the James Fisher Medical Centre in Shillingstone Drive is named) and his wife Rosemary and family came to Throop House where they lived until 1978. In 1975 James Fisher's eldest son Adrian, now professional international maze designer, created his first maze in the garden of Throop House; this maze, planted in holly, no longer exists.

In recent times, the house features a conservatory and an outdoor heated swimming pool with a 'Palladian style wall'. In 1995, a two-bedroom cottage was constructed. Also on site is Handston Court, which is a restored barn featuring an office space, kitchenette and shower room. As of November 2022, Throop House was on the market for £3,999,950.

=== Throop Ford and the Pig Shoot ===
There has been a ford across the River Stour for many centuries, some 400 metres downstream of Throop Mill. Tradition holds that it was the place where Sir Walter Tirel crossed the River Stour in August 1100 on his way to Poole and exile, having killed King William II in the New Forest a few hours earlier. Over the centuries, a substantial structure of posts was created, holding back a broad strip of gravel some 50 metres long. In Victorian times, crossing the ford was a popular highlight for horse-and-carriage trips by visitors to Bournemouth. In the Second World War, to deny advantage to a possible German invasion, the retaining posts were removed, and the ford was washed away. At this point, the river is now deep and makes a sharp turn, and all that remains of the ford is the sloping track down to the river known as the Pig Shoot, and the gravel track to which it is aligned on the opposite bank.

The track on the opposite bank leads on to a second ford, still intact, across the Leaden Stour. This is known locally as Pansy's Bathing Place, named after the golden retriever of Dr and Mrs James Fisher, who have lived in Throop (in Throop House and latterly in Throop Mill Cottage) since 1959. Pansy loved swimming in this ford.

== Politics ==
=== Local Government ===
Throop is part of the Muscliff and Strouden Park ward for elections to Bournemouth, Christchurch and Poole Council which elect three councillors. As of 2023, the three elected councillors are Brian George Castle (Independent), Kieron Wilson (Independent) and Lisa Northover (Independent).

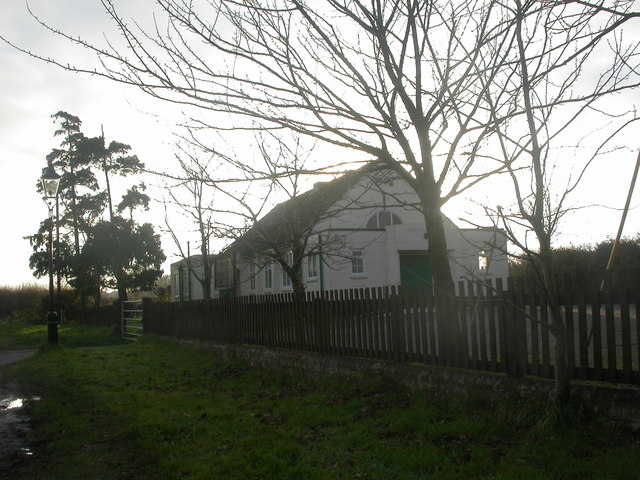
Holdenhurst Village Hall, where the Parish Council meet

Throop is part of the Bournemouth East parliamentary constituency, for elections to the House of Commons of the United Kingdom. As of 2026, the current Member of Parliament (MP) for Bournemouth East is Tom Hayes.

=== Parish Council ===
On 1 April 2019, campaigners submitted a petition with close to 300 signatures, asking for the creation of a parish council. This would allow locals to have more of a say with issues in their area.

On 1 April 2021, two years after the petition was submitted, Throop and Holdenhurst Village Council was formed.

== News ==
2004: Murderer followed by police

Danilo Restivo, a convicted murderer, was under round the clock surveillance by Dorset Police detectives, after being suspected in the murder of his neighbour, Heather Barnett, in 2002. On 11 May 2004, Restivo was filmed getting changed and then watching lone woman from the bushes around Throop. On this occasion, Restivo seemed to get spooked and went home. However, on returning to the area, a decision was made that police would intervene under the pretext that there had been thefts in the area. Officers asked to see what was in his bag and car and chillingly, they found a large filleting knife, two pairs of scissors, gloves, a balaclava, wipes and tissues; effectively his 'murder bag'. Restivo was found guilty of murdering Barnett, and later found guilty in his absence for murdering Elisa Claps in 1993, in his home town of Potenza, in Basilicata Southern Italy, by an Italian court. Restivo is serving a life sentence with a 40-year tariff.

2011: Red Arrow crash

Following a display at the Bournemouth Air Festival 2011, one of the Red Arrows Hawk aircraft crashed into a field in Throop, one mile from Bournemouth Airport. Flt Lt Jon Egging, pilot of Red 4 (XX179), died in the accident. The investigation into the incident determined that Flt Lt Egging was incapacitated due to the effects of g-LOC until very shortly before impact.

2019-2021: Hicks Farm 'Sang' Plans

In order for planned large-scale developments in Bournemouth to go ahead, BCP Council were required to find and develop a 'Sang' (Suitable natural alternative green space). An area proposed by the council was 12 hectares of green belt land, known as Hicks Farm in Throop.

In November 2019, a planning application was submitted for the SANG to the council. However, on 17 October 2020, the SANG was refused by the council, voting 11–1. The plans had received over 200 letters of objection.

On 27 February 2021, it was reported that revised plans had been submitted, in a bid to win approval. On 7 June 2021, it was reported that the second application had received 399 objections. However, In August 2022, much to the malign of the residents of Throop, with very little changes carried out to the original planning application a 'put-together' planning committee of BCP approved the development of a SANG adjacent to Hicks Farm.

== See also ==
- Death of Jon Egging - a Red Arrows pilot who died in Throop after his aircraft crashed into a field in the village
