= 2005 Royal Air Force Hercules shootdown =

Shooting down of a Royal Air Force Lockheed C-130K Hercules C1

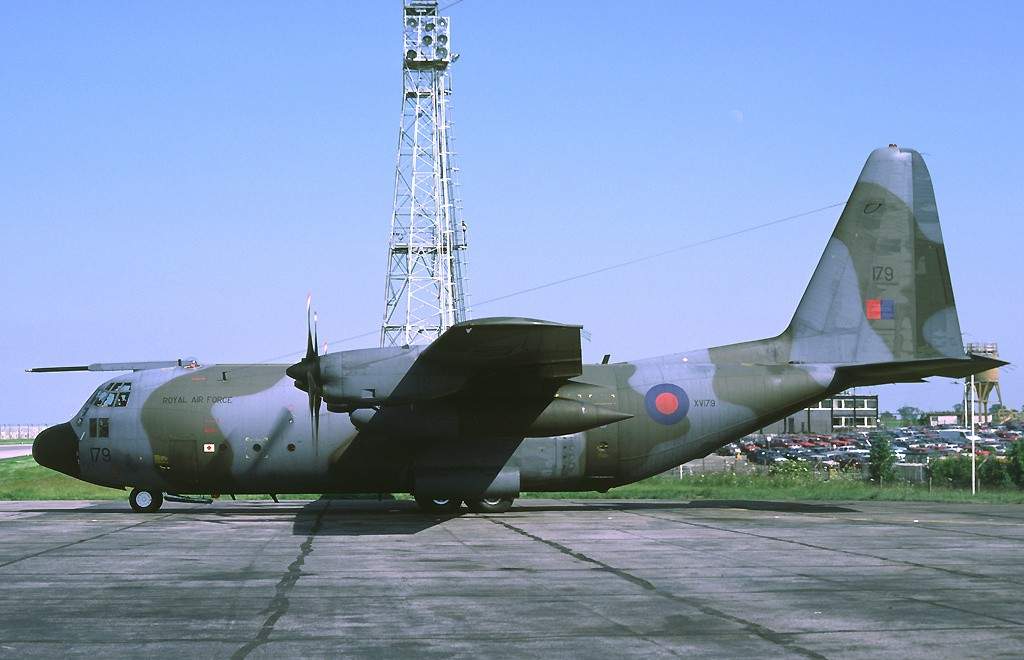
- XV179, the aircraft involved in the accident, pictured in July 1987

Incident
- Date: 30 January 2005
- Summary: Hostile ground fire
- Site: Iraq; 33°31′53.7″N 44°02′55.5″E

Aircraft
- Aircraft type: Lockheed C-130K Hercules C1
- Operator: Royal Air Force
- Registration: XV179
- Flight origin: Baghdad
- Destination: Balad
- Occupants: 10
- Passengers: 2
- Crew: 8
- Fatalities: 10
- Survivors: 0

On 30 January 2005, a Royal Air Force Lockheed C-130K Hercules C1, serial number XV179, callsign Hilton 22, was shot down in Iraq, probably by Sunni insurgents, killing all 10 personnel on board. At the time, the incident was the largest single loss of life suffered by the British military during Operation Telic.

The Board of Inquiry report in December 2005 identified the lack of a fire-suppressant system as a contributory factor. In September 2006, the British Channel 4 News aired an article criticising the Ministry of Defence for having fitted only one C-130 Hercules with a foam fire-suppressant system. The RAF had ordered a retrofit of this system to all front-line C130 aircraft, a system which could well have prevented the loss of aircraft XV179 and its crew.

== Attack ==
On 30 January 2005, Hercules XV179 of No. 47 Squadron RAF took off from Baghdad at 1624 local time. It was to fly at low level to Balad to deliver freight and the single passenger, Squadron Leader Marshall. Another supernumerary service person on board was a Survival Equipment Fitter. Everyone on board was on active service. Six minutes later, it was reported that the aircraft had a fire on board with the Royal Signals signaller, L/Cpl Jones (the only non-RAF service person aboard) stating: "No duff, no duff, We are on fire, we are on fire!" (Note: 'No duff' is military slang for not a drill.) It was confirmed that the aircraft was "missing" at 16:55 local time (13:55 Zulu time in the report). (Note: At that time of year, Iraqi local time was GMT+3. Regardless of where UK forces are deployed worldwide, all action is undertaken in Zulu time which remains constant throughout the year despite daylight saving time.)

American Apache helicopters located the crash site 45 minutes after the distress call, which was located 25 miles (40 km) north west of Baghdad. As the site was in a hostile area, the priority was for the recovery of the passengers and crew, personal effects and classified material. To that end, a team of USAF PJs was scrambled to search for survivors and secure the site. Part of the right hand wing was found to have separated from the body of the aircraft, and it was located 1.3 miles (2.1 km) south-southwest of the main crash site. The Board of Inquiry (BoI) investigating team travelled to the crash site 65 hours after the loss of the aircraft. They were only able to spend a short time at both sites due to local hostilities with a cordon and security being provided by 150 United States Marine Corps personnel. The BoI team had all the remaining wreckage dragged into a canal to deter further looting by locals. The tailfin of the aircraft was destroyed on site on orders of the BoI team, to prevent its use as a backdrop in propaganda videos.

G Squadron of the 22nd SAS Regiment immediately began hunting down the insurgents responsible, after a long intelligence operation, supported by US JSTARS, that led to operations later in that year in which the SAS captured some of those responsible. By 3 February, the site had been looted and the wreckage taken; it was decided not to attempt to recover the wreckage from the looters.

Those killed were eight crew from No. 47 Squadron, based at RAF Lyneham in Wiltshire; another RAF serviceman and one soldier.

== Board of Inquiry ==
The Board of Inquiry was convened on 31 January 2005 and reported in August. Without witnesses, no in-flight data recorder (ADR) and lacking evidence, the investigation worked by eliminating possible causes for the crash and then analysing remaining possibilities. The Board came to the conclusion that the aircraft had been shot down by ground fire; a projectile had penetrated the starboard wing fuel tank, causing a fire in the wing, the subsequent explosion leading to the loss of 23 ft of wing including the aileron. Therefore, the aircraft became uncontrollable and crashed. The Board found that there were contributory factors: flying low in daylight, lack of fire retarding technology in the fuel tanks, and a lack of up-to-date information on threats in the area. It was later discovered that two American Black Hawk helicopters had been targeted by surface-to-air missiles in the region where the Hercules was shot down. This information was not passed on to the crew of the Hercules because the Intelligence Officer in the area was unaware of the Hercules' presence, let alone the flight plan that had been filed for its journey.

The aircraft was fitted with various defences including a Directional Infra-Red Countermeasures system, flares, chaff and a missile warning system.

An internal RAF investigation concluded that a foam suppressant system might have prevented the loss of the aircraft and that "as a matter of urgency" all aircraft exposed to such risks should be so fitted, at a cost of £600,000 each.

== Controversy ==
Most United States Air Force (USAF) Hercules aircraft were fitted with Explosion Suppressant Foam (ESF) since the Vietnam war. Similarly, the Royal Australian Air Force (RAAF) Hercules aircraft were fitted with the foam system in 2004. Pilots from these air forces serving on exchange had expressed grave concerns about the safety of RAF Hercules, as did some RAF pilots, such as Squadron Leader Chris Seal who had written a memo in 2002 detailing lessons learned in Afghanistan and the necessity to fit ESF in all Hercules aircraft. As an example, one USAF aircraft was shot 19 times while overflying Iraq, but managed to land safely because of the ESF. However, most accepted that there was a degree of military risk in their jobs, and like Steady and his crew, got on with it. At the inquest, an Air Force witness who remained unidentified and was called 'EA' admitted that he had sacked a US Air Force pilot who had refused to carry out daylight low flying.

Air Marshal Sir John Baird, writing to a relative of a killed serviceman, called the situation a national disgrace. He said fitting the foam system now was "too little, too late". The later Chief of the Air Staff, Sir Glenn Torpy, writing to a relative of one killed, stated that all British servicemen are given all necessary safety equipment for their mission and that "until the loss of XV179, the Hercules aircraft was not judged vulnerable to this kind of attack". It was also noted in a Channel 4 programme that XV179 was not the first Hercules flying in Iraq to be hit in the fuel tank by ground fire.

No-one from the MOD was available to be interviewed by Channel 4 News, though a statement was issued:

Our aircraft are fitted with defence and survivability aids to reflect the operational environment in which they are deployed, however, no operational flying can ever be risk free. Since the loss of XV179 the MOD has started fuel tank inerting as a matter of urgency and we have decided to fit the explosive suppressant foam to some of our aircraft. The first aircraft is now fully fitted.

== Inquest ==
An inquest was opened in April 2008 and was presided over by the Wiltshire Coroner, David Masters, who delivered his verdict 22 October of the same year. His narrative verdict recorded that the men had died as a result of "unlawful killing by terrorist insurgents". He also found that the Royal Air Force and the Ministry of Defence let the families down by their failure [to fit the ESF] and accused them both of having "serious systemic failures".

The president of the Board of Inquiry, Wing Commander John Reid, gave evidence in court to the effect that while he considered the lack of fitting the ESF to aircraft was bad enough, the fact that intelligence reports had not been properly disseminated to the crew was a "failure of intelligence", which he regarded as a bigger blunder.
