= 1945 Broadway Consolidated Liberator crash =

Aviation incident in Somerset, England

1945 Devon Consolidated Liberator crash
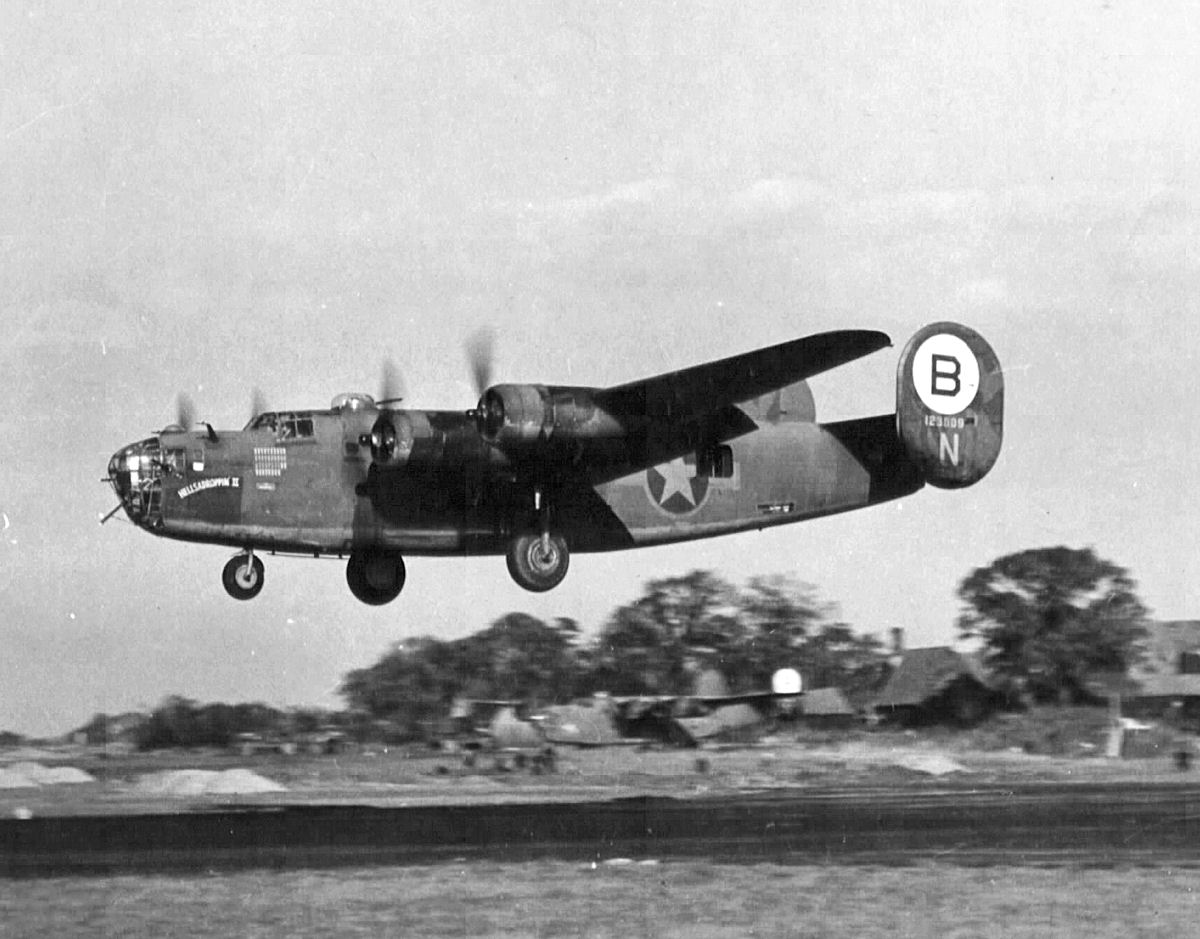
- A B-24 Liberator similar to the accident aircraft

Accident
- Date: 22 November 1945
- Summary: Pilot error
- Site: Broadway, Somerset, England; 50°57′41″N 2°56′00″W

Aircraft
- Aircraft type: Consolidated Liberator C Mk VIII
- Operator: 53 Squadron, Royal Air Force
- Registration: KH126
- Flight origin: RAF Merryfield
- Destination: India
- Occupants: 27
- Passengers: 22
- Crew: 5
- Fatalities: 27
- Survivors: 0

The 1945 Broadway Consolidated Liberator crash occurred on 22 November 1945 when a Royal Air Force Consolidated Liberator C Mk VIII transport crashed into a hill in poor visibility, shortly after take-off from RAF Merryfield. The aircraft (serial number KH126) was on a trooping flight from England to India, with five crew and 22 passengers, all of whom were killed. The remote site is about 6 miles (10 km) from RAF Merryfield, northeast of Buckland St. Mary, west of Broadway, and is marked with a memorial.

== Investigation ==
The cause of the crash was determined to be pilot error. After takeoff, the captain made a turn to the left well below the 1,500 feet minimum required as perstandard departure procedures. Low visibility and poor weather conditions were considered as contributory factors.

== See also ==
- 1943 Gibraltar B-24 crash
