= 1970 Royal Air Force Whirlwind crash =

Helicopter crash in England

1970 Patrick Brompton Whirlwind crash
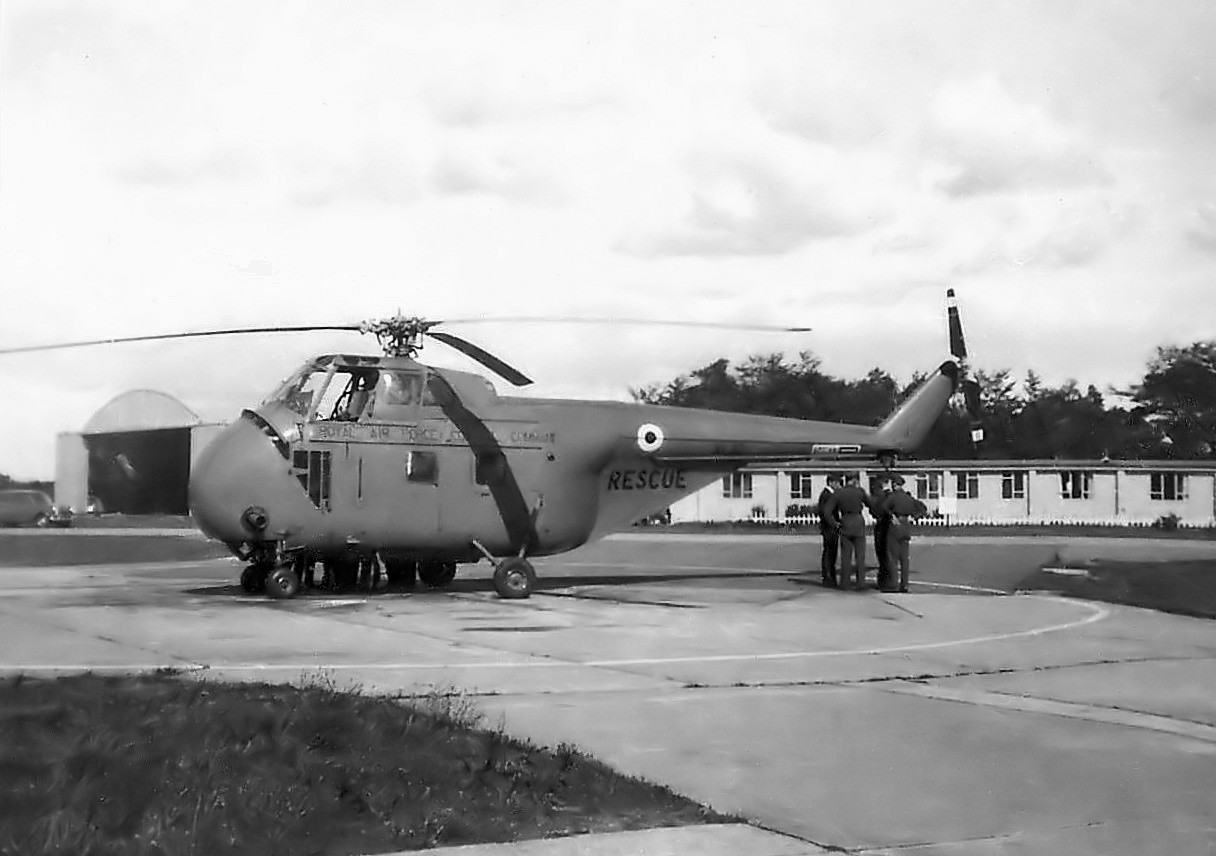
- Westland Whirlwind XL112 at RAF Leuchars 1962

Occurrence
- Date: 20 November 1970
- Summary: Helicopter crashed
- Site: Patrick Brompton, North Yorkshire, England; 54.308°N 1.689°W

Aircraft
- Aircraft type: Westland Whirlwind Mark X
- Aircraft name: Whirlwind
- Operator: Royal Air Force
- Registration: XL112
- Occupants: 4
- Passengers: 1
- Crew: 3
- Fatalities: 4

On 20 November 1970, a Royal Air Force Westland Whirlwind of No. 202 Squadron RAF crashed onto farmland near Patrick Brompton in North Yorkshire, England. All four service personnel on board the aircraft were killed; there were no recorded injuries on the ground or to civilians.

== Aircraft ==
The aircraft involved was XL112, a Westland Whirlwind which was being operated by No. 202 Squadron based at RAF Leconfield in the East Riding of Yorkshire. It was delivered to the RAF between November 1956 and February 1957, and had previously served on number 22, 227, and 228 Squadrons, with turns on 1563 and 1564 flights. At the time of the crash, it was taking part in a training exercise being organised from RAF Leconfield.

== Incident ==
The aircraft was taking part in an exercise in lower Wensleydale with a complement of four on board: the pilot was a Canadian military officer on an exchange programme, two other helicopter crew were aboard, and a passenger who was not part of the helicopter crew.

Eyewitnesses describe hearing the helicopters engines revving before a distinct crack, and then a whine was heard; they also describe the helicopter coming into view through the fog and it "..seemed to be disintegrating as I watched." The Whirlwind crashed at Grazing Nook Farm near to the village of Patrick Brompton spreading wreckage over a wide area of farmland. One of the rotorblades was discovered 1.5 miles (2.4 km) to the west of the main crash site, and the tail end of the helicopter was found 0.5 miles (0.80 km) away from the crash site. The bodies of two of the crew were found within the wreckage, whilst the other two personnel were thrown clear, with all dying at the scene.

It was later stated that the pilot had limited experience in flying the airframe by instrumentation in bad weather. It was also suggested that the bad weather caused issues for the aircraft as it ascended to 5,000 feet (1,500 m).

== Aftermath ==
An inquest was opened four days after the crash in the nearby town of Bedale. The coroner noted that "It is significant that there is no difference in the severity of the injuries between the two who were thrown out of the machine, and the two trapped inside." The pilot died of multiple skull fractures, the master navigator died from heart rupture, the winchman died from severe brain lacerations, and the other non-crewmember died from heart rupture and a broken neck. Although the public inquiry held by a coroner determined that the four people died accidentally, the RAF inquiry into the crash was not published immediately due to the technical aspects of the helicopter coming under the Official Secrets Act.

The owner of the farm who witnessed the crash regularly places a wreath at the site of the crash on the anniversary of the incident.
