= Martin-Baker Mk.9 =

British ejection seat

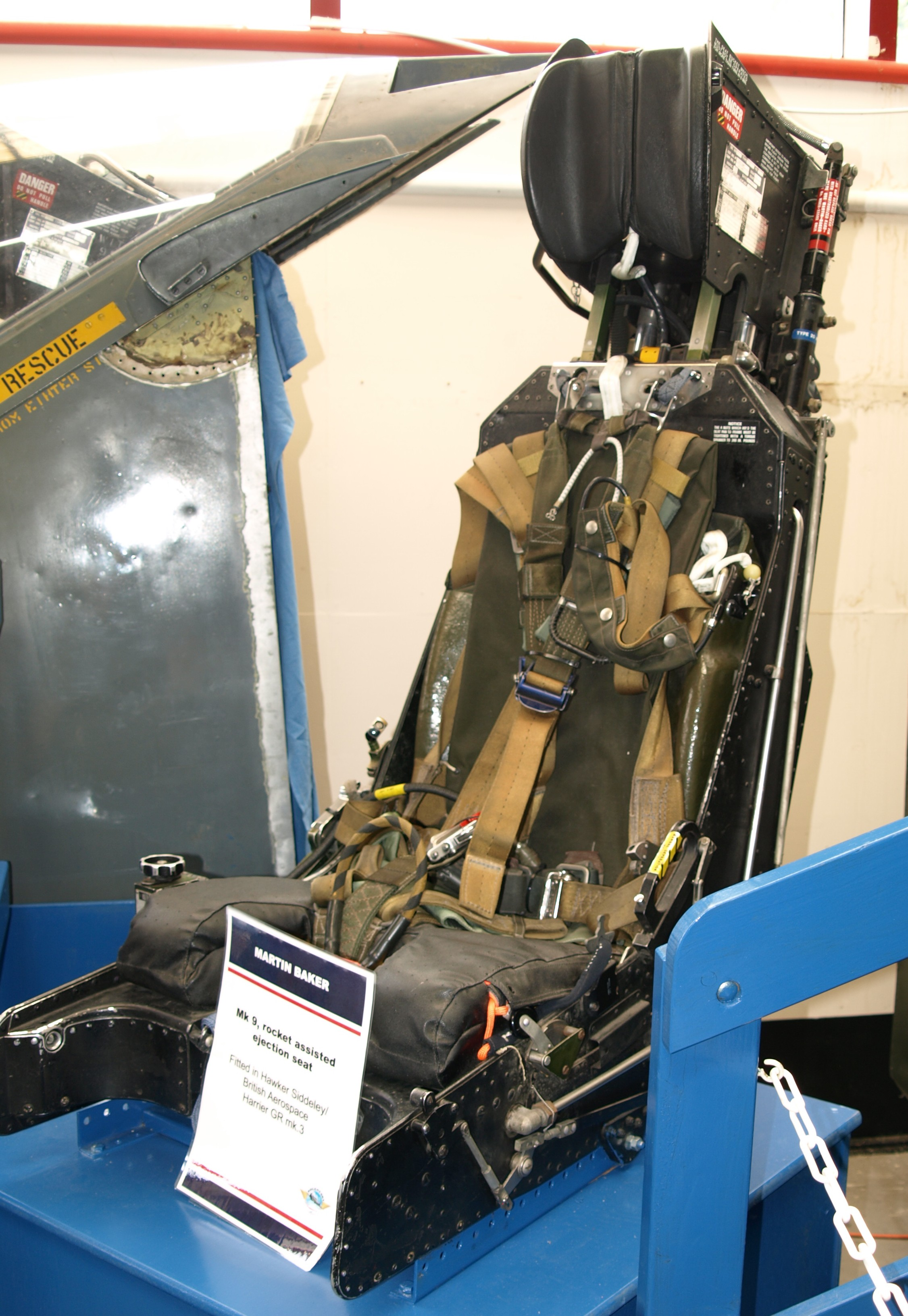
- Martin-Baker Mk.9 on display at the Solent Sky aviation museum

The Martin-Baker Mk.9 is a British rocket-assisted ejection seat designed and built by Martin-Baker. Introduced in the late-1960s, the zero-zero capable Mk.9 has been installed in several European combat aircraft types and was also used in experimental aircraft.

== History ==
The Mk.9 seat is considered by the manufacturer as the culmination of their earlier designs. It features only one firing handle (the face blind handle being deleted) and a new explosive gas system to operate canopy jettison, harness retraction and main gun firing, dispensing with previous mechanical systems of rods or cables.

== Operation sequence ==
Operating the seat pan firing handle initiates aircraft canopy jettison, as the canopy clears an interlock is removed which allows the main gun located at the rear of the seat to fire, the main gun is a telescopic tube with two explosive charges that fire in sequence. As the seat moves up its guide rails an emergency oxygen supply is activated and personal equipment tubing and communication leads are automatically disconnected, leg restraints also operate.

As the seat moves further up and out of the aircraft the rocket pack is fired by a lanyard attached to the cockpit floor. A steel rod, known as the drogue gun, is fired and extracts two small parachutes to stabilise the seat's descent path. A barostatic mechanism prevents the main parachute from opening above an altitude of 16,000 ft (5,000 m) A time delay mechanism operates the main parachute below this altitude in conjunction with another device to prevent the parachute opening at high speed. The seat then separates from the occupant for a normal parachute descent, a manual separation handle and ripcord is provided should the automatic system fail.

== Applications ==
The Mk.9 ejection seat has been installed in the following aircraft types:

- Dornier Do 31
- Hawker Siddeley Harrier
- Nord 500
- SEPECAT Jaguar
- VFW VAK 191B

== Seats on display ==
A Martin-Baker Mk.9A is on static display at the Royal Air Force Museum Cosford.

== Specifications (Mk.9) ==
- Maximum operating height: 50,000 ft (15,240 m)
- Minimum operating height: Ground level
- Minimum operating speed: Zero
- Maximum operating speed: 600 knots indicated airspeed
