= Holdenhurst =

Village in Dorset, England

Coordinates: 50.756667°N 1.819167°W

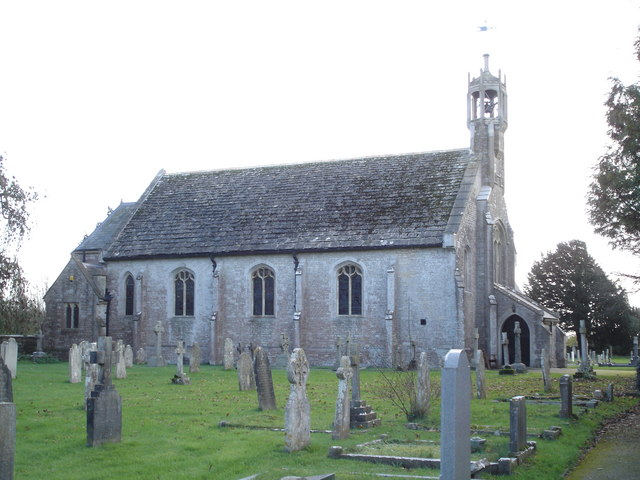
- St John's Church, Holdenhurst

- Location within Dorset
- Area: 0.5746 km^{2} (0.2219 sq mi)
- Population: 134 (2021 census)
  - Density: 233/km^{2} (600/sq mi)
- OS grid reference: SZ128952
- Civil parish: Throop and Holdenhurst
- Unitary authority: Bournemouth, Christchurch and Poole
- Ceremonial county: Dorset
- Region: South West
- Country: England
- Sovereign state: United Kingdom
- Post town: BOURNEMOUTH
- Postcode district: BH8
- Dialling code: 01202
- Police: Dorset
- Fire: Dorset and Wiltshire
- Ambulance: South Western
- UK Parliament: Bournemouth East
- Website: Holdenhurst Village

Holdenhurst is a village in the civil parish of Throop and Holdenhurst, in the Bournemouth, Christchurch and Poole district, in Dorset, England, situated in the green belt land of the north-east suburbs of Bournemouth. The village comprises fewer than 30 dwellings, two farms and the parish church. There are no shops and few local facilities in the village.

The village has only been accessible by car via a single narrow lane since the through route was cut off in the late 1960s by the building of the Bournemouth Spur Road (A338). There is no public transport.

Although the village itself has always been small, the civil parish at one time included the greater part of what is now Bournemouth. On 1 April 1931 the parish was abolished and merged with Bournemouth and Hurn and became part of the Bournemouth County Borough. In 1921 the parish had a population of 563. A new civil parish called Holdenhurst Village was created on 1 April 2013. In 2021 the parish had a population of 134. On 1 April 2024 the parish was abolished to form "Throop and Holdenhurst". However, the ecclesiastical parish still exists; it encompasses Hurn, East Parley and Bournemouth Airport, as well as the Townsend and adjacent areas of Bournemouth.

== Etymology ==
Holdenhurst is recorded in the Domesday Book as Holeest suggesting an etymology of Old English holegn meaning "holly" and hyrst meaning "grove, wood", giving a meaning of "wood where holly (Ilex aquifolium) grows". In succeeding centuries it was spelt Holeherst (12th century), Holhurst (13th century), Hollehurst (14th century), Holnehurst (15th century), Holnest (16th century) and Holnirst (17th century).

== Early history ==
The location of Holdenhurst on the edge of the flood plain of the lower Stour valley made it an ideal location for early farmers. There have been a large number of archaeological finds in the area including coins of the Durotriges tribe of Celtic Britain, and Roman coins have also been discovered making it likely that the Romans also settled in the area.

In the Domesday Book, Holdenhurst was part of the Edgegate hundred. The hundred of Holdenhurst existed in 1176, but was soon extended and became known as the hundred of Christchurch; with that part west of the Stour (the original hundred of Holdenhurst) being known as the district of West Stour, or Westover. By 1263, however, the hundred of Christchurch with Westover had again become known as the hundred of Holdenhurst.

== 19th and 20th centuries ==
Although there were many boundary and name changes over the years, even by the start of the 19th century the parish of Holdenhurst (also known as the Liberty of West Stour) encompassed the whole area between Christchurch in the east and Poole in the west. The area was still a remote and barren heathland, and much of it was common land used by the inhabitants for livestock and by the poor for wood and turves.

However, the Christchurch Inclosures Act 1802 (42 Geo. 3. c. 43 Pr.), entitled An Act for dividing, allotting and inclosing certain Commonable Lands and Waste Grounds within the Parish or Chapelry of Holdenhurst in the County of Southampton was passed in Parliament. Commissioners were appointed to divide up the land and allot it according to an individual's entitlement, and to set out the roads and to sell plots of land in order to pay for their work.

In 1870-72, John Marius Wilson's Imperial Gazetteer of England and Wales described Holdenhurst like this:

HOLDENHURST, a village and a parish in Christchurch district, Hants. The village stands on the river Stour, 3 miles NW of Christchurch r. station. The parish contains the tythings of Redhall, Moordown, Charminster, Stronden [sic], Great Dean and Little Down, Muccleshell, Muscliffe, and Throop; extends to the coast: and is all included in Christchurch borough.

Up until 1894 the parish comprised 7,390 acres (29.9 km^{2}). In that year part of it was formed into a separate parish of Winton, and that part lying on the coast was transferred to the new parish of Bournemouth. Further portions of the parish were later transferred to Bournemouth and to Southbourne, and by 1912 the parish of Holdenhurst comprised an area of 3,080 acres (12.5 km^{2}).

In 1931, the whole of the remaining part of the parish was subsumed into the County Borough of Bournemouth, later to be transferred from the county of Hampshire to Dorset, and in 1997 to become a unitary authority.

== Politics ==
Holdenhurst is part of the Muscliff and Strouden Park ward for elections to Bournemouth, Christchurch and Poole Council which elect three councillors.

Holdenhurst is part of the Bournemouth East parliamentary constituency, for elections to the House of Commons of the United Kingdom.
