= Littledown =

Suburb of Bournemouth, Dorset, England

Coordinates: 50.744°N 1.825°W

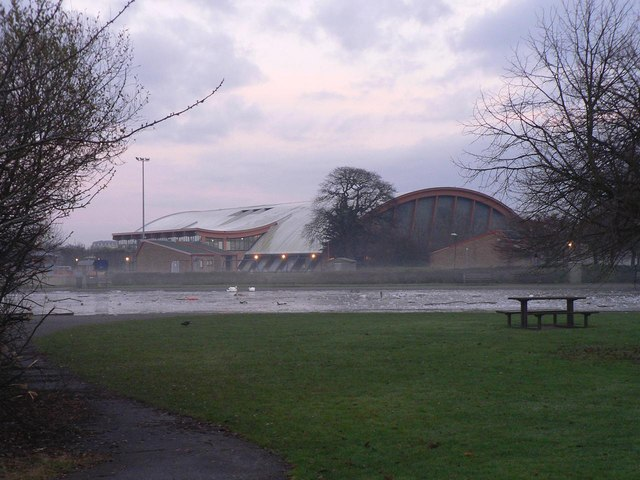
- Littledown leisure centre and pond

- Location within Dorset
- Population: 9,726 (ward, 2011)
- OS grid reference: SZ123938
- Unitary authority: Bournemouth, Christchurch and Poole
- Ceremonial county: Dorset
- Region: South West
- Country: England
- Sovereign state: United Kingdom
- Post town: BOURNEMOUTH
- Postcode district: BH7
- Dialling code: 01202
- Police: Dorset
- Fire: Dorset and Wiltshire
- Ambulance: South Western
- UK Parliament: Bournemouth East

Littledown is a suburb of Bournemouth, in Dorset, England. Originally it was a small settlement to the south of the much more important Holdenhurst Village, and for centuries it existed as a huddle of farm buildings on the edge of heathland. As the town of Bournemouth expanded, Littledown remained as a farming community with areas of open fields on the town's northern edge, with the Cooper-Dean family residing in Littledown House. Eventually however the only Cooper-Dean descendants were two spinster sisters who sold Littledown House, with the surrounding farmland, to Bournemouth Council in the early 1980s. After public discussion on what the Council would do with the area, eventually much of the land was sold off for housing, although a large section was set by for a park and a sports centre.

Most of the built environment that now makes up Littledown was subsequently developed in the 1980s. Notable buildings include the Chaseside Campus of JPMorgan, the Royal Bournemouth Hospital, Bournemouth County Court and the Littledown Leisure Centre. In Riverside Avenue there is a mid-20th century home for retired nurses.

Littledown House, a listed building dating back to the late 18th century, is located in the grounds of the JPMorgan campus, and has been restored to the elegance it would have displayed at the time of its construction, when it would have been a classic Jane Austen-type mansion. With all the new buildings that now cover Littledown, it can be difficult to imagine it as farmland, but drivers on the A338 Spur Road can look out for a set of warning lights near to the back of the hospital site. When the Spur Road was first built, it cut off the Cooper Dean land at Littledown from their farms at Holdenhurst. One of the concessions to the family was that the road was built with a cattle crossing. No one seems to recall it ever being used, however the old agreement remains in force.

Littledown is south east of Strouden Park and Townsend.

== History ==
Historically part of Hampshire, Littledown was known archaically known as Little Down.

In 1870-72, John Marius Wilson's Imperial Gazetteer of England and Wales described Holdenhurst like this:

HOLDENHURST, a village and a parish in Christchurch district, Hants. The village stands on the river Stour, 3 miles NW of Christchurch r. station. The parish contains the tythings of Redhall, Moordown, Charminster, Stronden [sic], Great Dean and Little Down, Muccleshell, Muscliffe, and Throop; extends to the coast: and is all included in Christchurch borough.

== Politics ==
Littledown is part of the Littledown and Iford ward for elections to Bournemouth, Christchurch and Poole Council which elect two councillors.

Littledown is part of the Bournemouth East parliamentary constituency, for elections to the House of Commons of the United Kingdom.
