= Bournemouth East by-election =

Bournemouth East by-election may refer to:

- 1952 Bournemouth East and Christchurch by-election
- 1977 Bournemouth East by-election
