= Bournemouth East =

UK Parliament constituency (since 1974)

Coordinates: 50.725°N 1.803°W

- Borough constituency for the House of Commons
- Boundary of Bournemouth East in South West England
- County: Dorset
- Population: 102,152 (2011 census)
- Electorate: 73,173 (2023)

Current constituency
- Created: 1974
- Member of Parliament: Tom Hayes (Labour)
- Seats: One
- Created from: Bournemouth East and Christchurch

Bournemouth East is a parliamentary constituency (Note: A borough constituency (for the purposes of election expenses and type of returning officer)) in Dorset represented in the House of Commons of the UK Parliament since 2024 by Tom Hayes, of the Labour Party. (Note: As with all constituencies, the constituency elects one Member of Parliament (MP) by the first past the post system of election at least every 5 years.)

== Constituency profile ==
The constituency covers the eastern suburbs of Bournemouth including Boscombe, Muscliff, Springbourne and Southbourne. Bournemouth is a large seaside resort town on the south coast of England. The town is located in Dorset but was traditionally in Hampshire. Bournemouth is a popular tourist destination; in 2011, 15% of the town's population were employed in the tourism sector and the seafront received 4.5 million visitors.

Levels of wealth, education, professional employment and ethnic diversity in the constituency are similar to national averages. Local politics were mixed at the most recent local council election in 2023. Labour Party councillors were elected in the more deprived parts of the constituency close to the town centre. The more affluent eastern suburbs of Southbourne and Iford elected Conservative and Liberal Democrat councillors. Independent and Green Party representatives were elected in the northern areas of Muscliff and Moordown. Similar to the country as a whole, the constituency voted marginally in favour of leaving the European Union in the 2016 referendum, with an estimated 53% of voters supporting Brexit.

== Boundaries ==
Bournemouth East 1974–1983 in Hampshire

Map of boundaries from 2024

The constituency is based on the eastern portion of Bournemouth, in Dorset, including the Southbourne district at the border of Christchurch, Boscombe, Throop, Moordown, Muscliff, Townsend, Littledown, Richmond Park, Springbourne, Iford and Queen's Park. Bournemouth Town Centre was in this constituency from 1983 to 1997.

1974–1983: The County Borough of Bournemouth wards of Boscombe East, Boscombe West, King's Park, Moordown North, Moordown South, Queen's Park, Southbourne, and West Southbourne.

1983–1997: The Borough of Bournemouth wards of Boscombe East, Boscombe West, Central, East Cliff, Littledown, Moordown, Muscliff, Queen's Park, Southbourne, Strouden Park, and West Southbourne.

1997–2010: The Borough of Bournemouth wards of Boscombe East, Boscombe West, Littledown, Moordown, Muscliff, Queen's Park, Southbourne, Strouden Park, and West Southbourne.

2010–2024: The Borough of Bournemouth wards of Boscombe East, Boscombe West, East Cliff and Springbourne, East Southbourne and Tuckton, Littledown and Iford, Moordown, Queen's Park, Strouden Park, Throop and Muscliff, and West Southbourne.

For the 2010 general election, the western boundary of the constituency changed so that it aligned with ward boundaries (which had changed since the constituency boundary changes of the 1990s). The main changes saw East Cliff brought into the constituency with the loss of part of east Winton.

2024–present: The District of Bournemouth, Christchurch and Poole wards of Boscombe East & Pokesdown; Boscombe West; East Cliff & Springbourne; East Southbourne & Tuckton; Littledown & Ilford; Moordown; Muscliff & Strouden Park; Queen's Park; and West Southbourne.

Very small change following re-organisation of local authorities and wards in Dorset.

== History ==
This was a safe seat for the Conservatives since its creation in 1974 with Liberal-inclined candidates being their main opponents, the Labour Party finishing a distant second place on only two occasions in a 1977 by-election, and the 1979 General Election.

Labour finished second behind the Conservatives for the first time in over three decades in 2015, with a large swing in their favour in 2017, as wards within Bournemouth East were beginning to swing to Labour, particularly Boscombe, with Labour eventually winning the seat in 2024 for the first time on a swing of 15%.

== Members of Parliament ==
Election	Member	Party
Feb 1974	John Cordle	Conservative
1977 by-election	David Atkinson	Conservative
2005	Tobias Ellwood	Conservative
2022	Tobias Ellwood	Independent
2022	Tobias Ellwood	Conservative
2024	Tom Hayes	Labour

== Elections ==
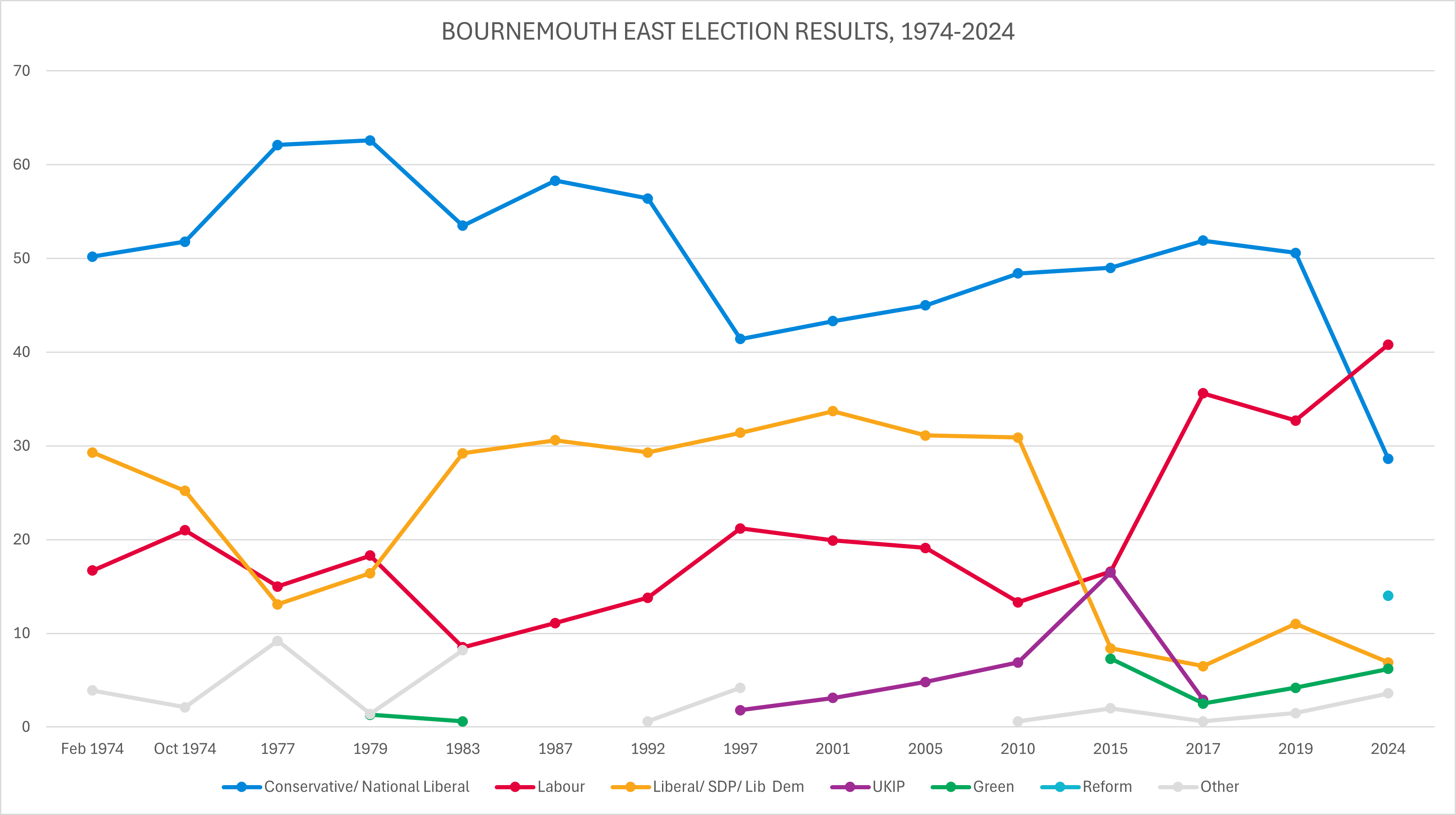
Election results 1974-2024

=== Elections in the 2020s ===
General election 2024: Bournemouth East
Party	Candidate	Votes	%	±%
Labour	Tom Hayes	18,316	40.8	+8.1
Conservative	Tobias Ellwood	12,837	28.6	−22.0
Reform	Martin Houlden	6,268	14.0	N/A
Liberal Democrats	Jon Nicholas	3,082	6.9	−4.1
Green	Joe Salmon	2,790	6.2	+2.0
Independent	Kieron Wilson	1,529	3.4	N/A
SDP	Miles Penn	88	0.2	N/A
Majority		5,479	12.2	N/A
Turnout		44,910	61.2	–5.3
Registered electors		73,352		
Labour gain from Conservative		Swing	+15.0	

=== Elections in the 2010s ===
General election 2019: Bournemouth East
Party	Candidate	Votes	%	±%
Conservative	Tobias Ellwood	24,926	50.6	–1.3
Labour	Corrie Drew	16,120	32.7	–2.9
Liberal Democrats	Philip Dunn	5,418	11.0	+4.5
Green	Alasdair Keddie	2,049	4.2	+1.7
Independent	Ben Aston	447	0.9	N/A
Independent	Emma Johnson	314	0.6	N/A
Majority		8,806	17.9	+1.6
Turnout		49,274	66.5	+1.3
Conservative hold		Swing	+0.8	

General election 2017: Bournemouth East
Party	Candidate	Votes	%	±%
Conservative	Tobias Ellwood	25,221	51.9	+2.9
Labour	Mel Semple	17,284	35.6	+19.0
Liberal Democrats	Jon Nicholas	3,168	6.5	–1.9
UKIP	David Hughes	1,405	2.9	–13.6
Green	Alasdair Keddie	1,236	2.5	–4.8
Independent	Kieron Wilson	304	0.6	N/A
Majority		7,937	16.3	–16.3
Turnout		48,618	65.2	+2.6
Conservative hold		Swing	–8.1	

General election 2015: Bournemouth East
Party	Candidate	Votes	%	±%
Conservative	Tobias Ellwood	22,060	49.0	+0.6
Labour	Peter Stokes	7,448	16.6	+3.3
UKIP	David Hughes	7,401	16.5	+9.6
Liberal Democrats	Jon Nicholas	3,752	8.4	−22.5
Green	Alasdair Keddie	3,263	7.3	N/A
Independent	David Ross	903	2.0	N/A
Majority		14,612	32.6	+15.1
Turnout		45,014	62.6	+0.7
Conservative hold		Swing		

General election 2010: Bournemouth East
Party	Candidate	Votes	%	±%
Conservative	Tobias Ellwood	21,320	48.4	+3.4
Liberal Democrats	Lisa Northover	13,592	30.9	−0.2
Labour	David Stokes	5,836	13.3	−5.8
UKIP	David Hughes	3,027	6.9	+2.1
Independent	Steven Humphrey	249	0.6	N/A
Majority		7,728	17.5	+3.6
Turnout		44,024	61.9	+2.6
Conservative hold		Swing	+1.8	

=== Elections in the 2000s ===
General election 2005: Bournemouth East
Party	Candidate	Votes	%	±%
Conservative	Tobias Ellwood	16,925	45.0	+1.7
Liberal Democrats	Andrew Garratt	11,681	31.1	−2.6
Labour	David Stokes	7,191	19.1	−0.8
UKIP	Thomas Collier	1,802	4.8	+1.7
Majority		5,244	13.9	+4.3
Turnout		37,599	59.3	+1.1
Conservative hold		Swing	+2.2	

General election 2001: Bournemouth East
Party	Candidate	Votes	%	±%
Conservative	David Atkinson	15,501	43.3	+1.9
Liberal Democrats	Andrew Garratt	12,067	33.7	+2.3
Labour	Paul Nicholson	7,107	19.9	−1.3
UKIP	George Chamberlaine	1,124	3.1	+1.3
Majority		3,434	9.6	−0.4
Turnout		35,799	58.2	−12.0
Conservative hold		Swing		

=== Elections in the 1990s ===
General election 1997: Bournemouth East
Party	Candidate	Votes	%	±%
Conservative	David Atkinson	17,997	41.4	−14.0
Liberal Democrats	Douglas Eyre	13,655	31.4	+0.4
Labour	Jessica Stevens	9,181	21.2	+8.3
Referendum	Alan Musgrave-Scott	1,808	4.2	N/A
UKIP	Kenneth Benney	791	1.8	N/A
Majority		4,346	10.01	−14.4
Turnout		43,432	70.21	
Conservative hold		Swing		

General election 1992: Bournemouth East
Party	Candidate	Votes	%	±%
Conservative	David Atkinson	30,820	56.4	−1.9
Liberal Democrats	Neil Russell	15,998	29.3	−1.3
Labour	Peter Brushett	7,541	13.8	+2.7
Natural Law	Susan Holmes	329	0.6	N/A
Majority		14,822	27.1	−0.6
Turnout		54,688	72.8	+2.3
Conservative hold		Swing	-0.3	

=== Elections in the 1980s ===
General election 1987: Bournemouth East
Party	Candidate	Votes	%	±%
Conservative	David Atkinson	30,925	58.3	+4.8
Liberal	John Millward	16,242	30.6	+1.4
Labour	Ian Taylor	5,885	11.1	+2.6
Majority		14,683	27.7	+3.4
Turnout		53,052	70.5	+3.9
Conservative hold		Swing		

General election 1983: Bournemouth East
Party	Candidate	Votes	%	±%
Conservative	David Atkinson	25,176	53.5	−9.2
Liberal	John Millward	13,760	29.2	+12.7
Labour	Michael Shutler	4,026	8.5	−9.9
Ind. Conservative	Phyllis Hogarth	3,644	7.7	N/A
Ecology	Trevor Dykes	273	0.6	−0.7
Monster Raving Loony	Jeremy Stooks	225	0.5	N/A
Majority		11,416	24.3	
Turnout		47,104	66.6	
Conservative hold		Swing	−11.0	

=== Elections in the 1970s ===
General election 1979: Bournemouth East
Party	Candidate	Votes	%	±%
Conservative	David Atkinson	25,808	62.6	+10.8
Labour	Joseph Goodwin	7,553	18.3	−2.7
Liberal	Donald Matthew	6,738	16.4	−8.8
New Britain	John Philip Pratt	581	1.4	N/A
Ecology	Jacqueline Mary Dempsey	523	1.3	N/A
Majority		18,255	44.3	+17.7
Turnout		41,203	73.1	+2.6
Conservative hold		Swing		

By-election 1977: Bournemouth East
Party	Candidate	Votes	%	±%
Conservative	David Atkinson	15,235	62.1	+10.3
Labour	Joseph Goodwin	3,684	15.0	−6.0
Liberal	Donald Matthew	3,212	13.1	−12.1
New Britain	John Philip Pratt	1,127	4.6	N/A
National Front	Kenneth Roderick McKilliam	725	3.0	+0.9
International Marxist	Brian Heron	494	1.4	N/A
Democratic Monarchist, Public Safety, White Resident	Bill Boaks	42	0.2	N/A
Majority		11,551	47.1	+20.5
Turnout		24,519	24.5	−46.0
Conservative hold		Swing		

General election October 1974: Bournemouth East
Party	Candidate	Votes	%	±%
Conservative	John Cordle	20,790	51.8	+1.6
Liberal	George Hamilton Musgrave	10,129	25.2	−4.1
Labour	Desmond Earle Lock	8,422	21.0	+4.3
National Front	Michael John Hayes	828	2.1	+0.1
Majority		10,661	26.6	+5.7
Turnout		40,149	70.5	−8.1
Conservative hold		Swing		

General election February 1974: Bournemouth East
Party	Candidate	Votes	%	±%
Conservative	John Cordle	22,319	50.2	
Liberal	George Hamilton Musgrave	13,005	29.3	
Labour	Desmond Earle Lock	7,423	16.7	
National Front	Michael John Hayes	875	2.0	
Anti-EEC	Alan Stanley Reynolds	834	1.9	
Majority		9,314	20.95	
Turnout		44,456	78.6	
Conservative win (new seat)				

== See also ==
- List of parliamentary constituencies in Dorset
