= Strouden Park =

Suburb of Bournemouth, England

Coordinates: 50°45.0′N 1°50.7′W

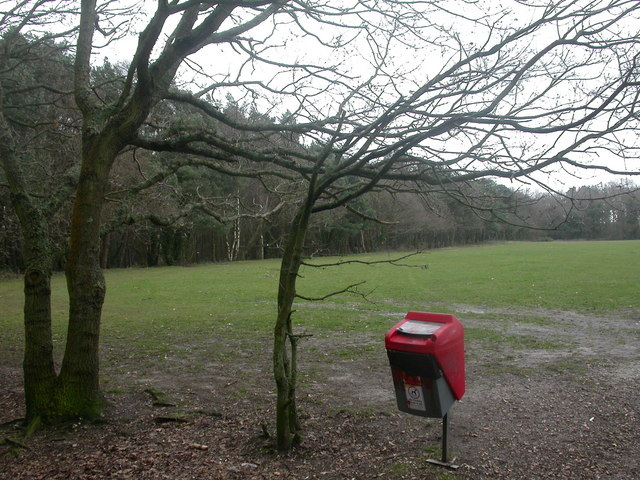
Strouden Woods

Strouden Park or Strouden is an area of Bournemouth, Dorset, England.

== History ==
Historically part of Hampshire, Strouden Park was known archaically known as Stronden.

In 1870-72, John Marius Wilson's Imperial Gazetteer of England and Wales described Holdenhurst like this:

HOLDENHURST, a village and a parish in Christchurch district, Hants. The village stands on the river Stour, 3 miles NW of Christchurch r. station. The parish contains the tythings of Redhall, Moordown, Charminster, Stronden [sic], Great Dean and Little Down, Muccleshell, Muscliffe, and Throop; extends to the coast: and is all included in Christchurch borough.

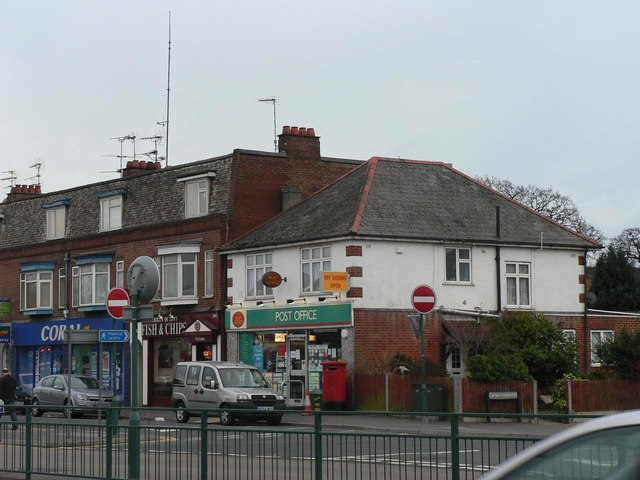
Shops and post office in 2008

On 17 April 2021, the local post office and convenience store was destroyed in a fire.

== Geography ==
Strouden Park is north of Queen's Park, west of Townsend and east of Redhill. Woodbury is an area of Strouden Park. Woodbury Roundabout is a major intersection of the A3060 road.

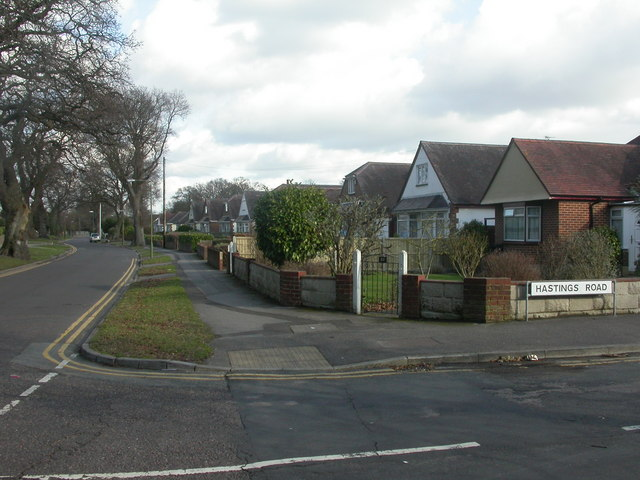
Woodbury Avenue in Strouden Park

== Facilities ==
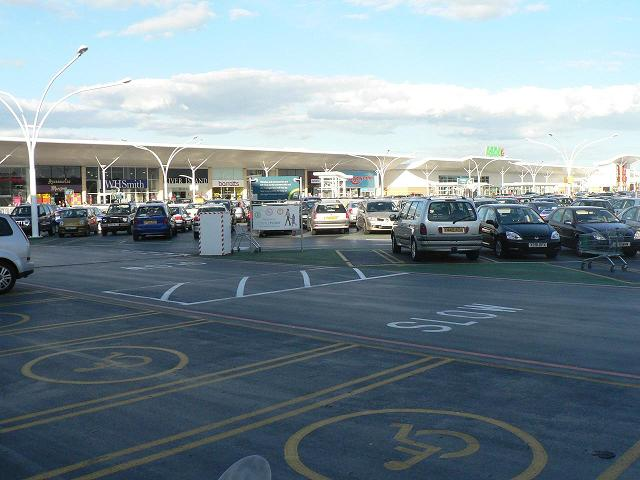
Castlepoint Shopping Centre, Strouden Park

Strouden Park is served by a National Health Service surgery and the Castlepoint Shopping Centre.

Bournemouth North Cemetery and Bournemouth Crematorium is off Strouden Avenue.

== Governance ==
Strouden Park is part of the Muscliff and Strouden Park ward which elects three members of Bournemouth, Christchurch and Poole Council. It is part of the Bournemouth East parliamentary constituency, for elections to the House of Commons of the United Kingdom.
