= Muscliff and Strouden Park =

Electoral ward in Bournemouth, Dorset, England

Boundary of Muscliff and Strouden Park in Bournemouth, Christchurch and Poole.

Muscliff and Strouden Park is a ward in Bournemouth, Dorset. Since 2019, the ward has elected 3 councillors to Bournemouth, Christchurch and Poole Council.

== History ==
In August 2024, councillor Brian George Castle died.

== Geography ==
The ward is located in the north eastern suburbs of Bournemouth, including some rural green belt areas of the South East Dorset conurbation. The ward takes its name from the areas of Muscliff and Strouden Park. Other areas in the ward include Holdenhurst, Townsend and Throop. The largest employer in the ward is the Castlepoint Shopping Centre.

== Election results ==
=== 2024 by-election ===
Muscliff and Strouden Park by-election 24 October 2024
Party	Candidate	Votes	%	±%
Conservative	Toby Slade	1,008	43.4	
Labour	Eyyup Kilinc	434	18.7	
Independent	Julie-Anne Houldey	406	17.5	
Liberal Democrats	Richard Blackwell Whitehead	174	7.5	
Independent	Peter Rogers	118	5.1	
Independent	Conor O'Luby	100	4.3	
Green	Roger Mann	84	3.6	
Majority		574	26.7	
Turnout		2,150		
Conservative gain from Independent		Swing		

=== 2023 ===
Muscliff and Strouden Park
Party	Candidate	Votes	%	±%
Independent	Kieron Wilson‡	1,595	44.8	−6.7
Independent	Lisa Northover‡	1,227	34.4	−3.9
Independent	Brian George Castle	1,058	29.7	N/A
Conservative	Ian Charles Clark	894	25.1	+1.6
Independent	Liz Lucas	879	24.7	N/A
Conservative	Derek Frank Borthwick‡	870	24.4	−0.3
Conservative	Kierran Lister Paxton	817	22.9	+2.6
Labour	Farah Bassinder	724	20.3	+7.5
Labour	Robert Bassinder	703	19.7	+9.4
Labour	Johny M Skaria	640	18.0	+8.1
Liberal Democrats	Oliva Sidaway	195	5.5	N/A
Liberal Democrats	Brian James Palmer	188	5.3	N/A
Liberal Democrats	Martin Michael Sheppard	157	4.4	N/A
Majority				
Turnout		3,562	28.41	
Independent hold		Swing		
Independent hold		Swing		
Independent gain from Conservative		Swing		

=== 2019 ===
Muscliff and Strouden Park (3 seats)
Party	Candidate	Votes	%	±%
Independent	Kieron Wilson	2,129		
Independent	Lisa Northover	1,581		
Conservative	Derek Borthwick	1,022		
Conservative	Ian Clark	973		
Independent	John Trickett	846		
Conservative	Michael Weinhonig	841		
Green	Peter Lucas	694		
Independent	John Adams	652		
UKIP	Fiona Dougherty	621		
Labour	Jilly Grower	531		
Labour	Paul Forsdick	427		
Labour	Steve Laughton	410		
Majority				
Turnout				
Independent win (new seat)				
Independent win (new seat)				
Conservative win (new seat)				
