= John Cordle =

British politician (1912–2004)

Member of Parliament for Bournemouth East (Bournemouth East and Christchurch, 1959–1974)
- In office 8 October 1959 – 25 July 1977
- Preceded by: Nigel Nicolson
- Succeeded by: David Atkinson

Personal details
- Born: John Howard Cordle; 11 October 1912
- Died: 23 November 2004 (aged 92)
- Party: Conservative
- Spouses: Grace Lucy Walkey (m. 1938; div. 1956) Venetia Caroline Maynard (m. 1957; div. 1971) Terttu Heikura (m. 1976)
- Children: 11
- Education: City of London School

John Howard Cordle (11 October 1912 – 23 November 2004) was a British Conservative politician who sat in the House of Commons from 1959 to 1977.

== Life and career ==
Cordle, the son of Ernest William Cordle and Lily Adelina née Jones, was educated at the City of London School and became managing director of E. W. Cordle and Son Ltd. in 1946. He was also a member of Lloyd's of London. He served as a member of the Church Assembly 1946–53, as a director of the Church Society from 1951 and of the Church of England Newspaper from 1959.

Cordle contested The Wrekin in 1951. He was Member of Parliament for Bournemouth East and Christchurch from 1959 to 1974, and after boundary changes, for Bournemouth East from 1974 to 1977, when he resigned as a result of the John Poulson scandal. David Atkinson was elected as his successor in the subsequent by-election.

== Family ==
Cordle was married three times. He was first married in 1938 (divorced 1956) to Grace Lucy Walkey (1918-2021); by this marriage he had four sons and a daughter. He married secondly in 1957 (divorced 1971) to Venetia Caroline Maynard (b. 22 March 1936), by whom he had one son and three daughters, including Marina, Viscountess Cowdray. He married thirdly in 1976 to Terttu Heikura, his children's nanny who was 35 years his junior, by whom he had two sons.

== Sources ==
- Times Guide to the House of Commons October 1974
- Leigh Rayment's Historical List of MPs
- The Times obituary, 24 November 2004. Retrieved 17 November 2008.
- Daily Telegraph obituary 24 November 2004. Retrieved 17 November 2008.
- Andrew Roth. The Guardian obituary 25 November 2004. Retrieved 17 November 2008.
- John Barnes. The Independent obituary 9 December 2004. Retrieved 17 November 2008.
- Genealogy of Grace Lucy Walkey, the first Mrs Cordle

Parliament of the United Kingdom
Preceded by Nigel Nicolson	Member of Parliament for Bournemouth East and Christchurch; 1959 – February 1974	Constituency abolished
New constituency	Member of Parliament for Bournemouth East; February 1974 – 1977	Succeeded by David Atkinson
