= Tobias Ellwood =

British-American politician, soldier and author (born 1966)

Lieutenant Colonel The Right Honourable Tobias Ellwood VR
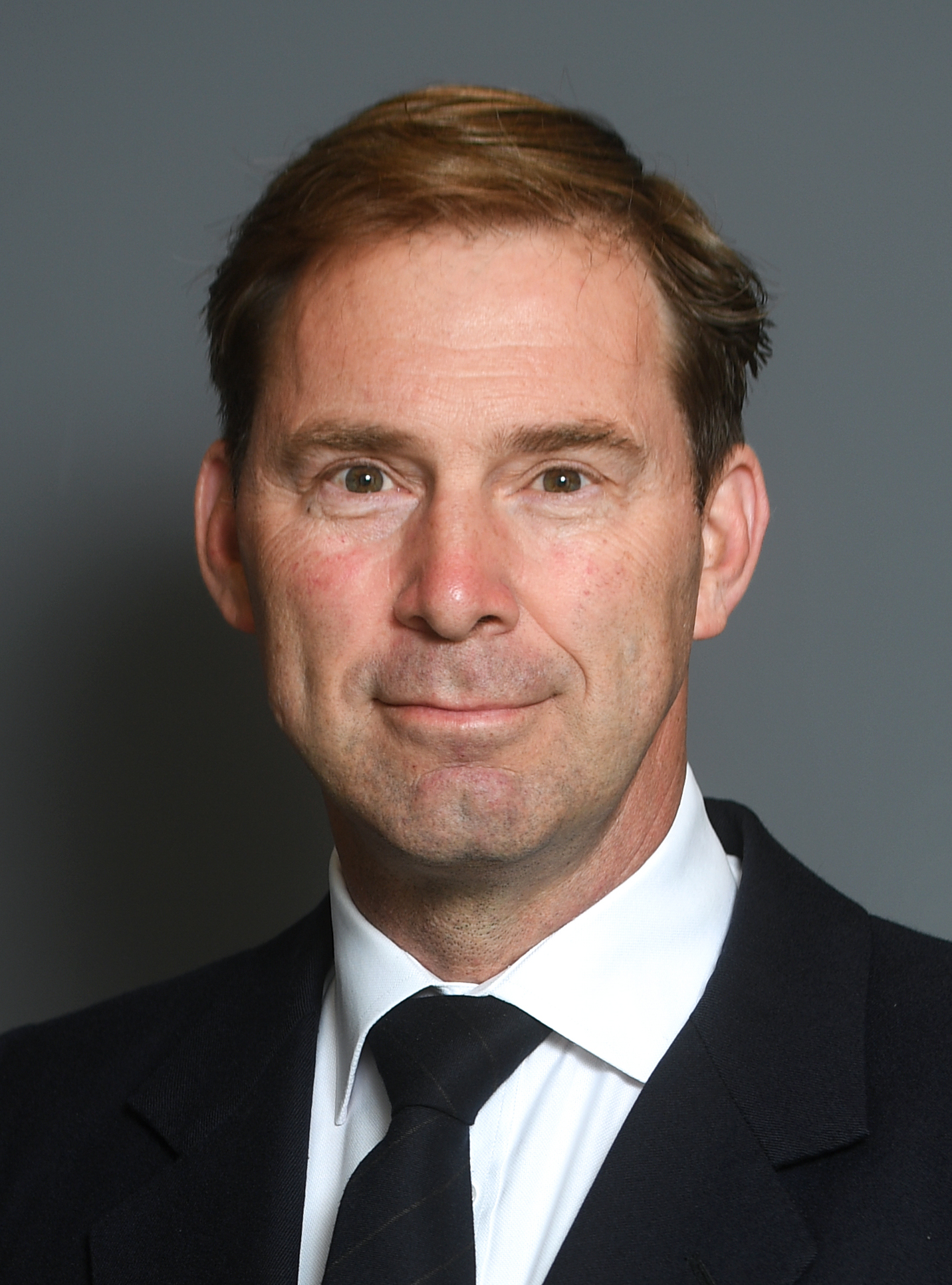
- Official portrait, 2022

Chair of the Defence Select Committee
- In office 29 January 2020 – 14 September 2023
- Preceded by: Julian Lewis
- Succeeded by: Robert Courts

Parliamentary Under-Secretary of State for Defence Veterans, Reserves and Personnel
- In office 14 June 2017 – 26 July 2019
- Prime Minister: Theresa May
- Preceded by: Mark Lancaster
- Succeeded by: Johnny Mercer

Parliamentary Under-Secretary of State for Africa
- In office 16 July 2016 – 13 June 2017
- Prime Minister: Theresa May
- Preceded by: James Duddridge
- Succeeded by: Rory Stewart

Parliamentary Under-Secretary of State for Middle East and North Africa
- In office 15 July 2014 – 13 June 2017
- Prime Minister: David Cameron; Theresa May
- Preceded by: Hugh Robertson
- Succeeded by: Alistair Burt

Member of Parliament for Bournemouth East
- In office 5 May 2005 – 30 May 2024
- Preceded by: David Atkinson
- Succeeded by: Tom Hayes

Personal details
- Born: Tobias Martin Ellwood; 12 August 1966 (age 60) New York City, U.S.
- Party: Conservative
- Spouse: Hannah Ryan (m. 2005)
- Children: 2
- Education: Loughborough University (BA); City, University of London (MBA)
- Website: www.tobiasellwood.com

Military service
- Allegiance: United Kingdom
- Branch/service: British Army
- Years of service: 1989–1991 (reserve); 1991–1996 (regular); 1996–present (reserve)
- Rank: Lieutenant Colonel
- Unit: Royal Green Jackets; Army Reserve Reinforcement Group (reserve)

Tobias Martin Ellwood VR (born 12 August 1966) is a British-American former Conservative Party politician and soldier who served as the Member of Parliament (MP) for Bournemouth East from 2005 to 2024. He chaired the Defence Select Committee from 2020 to 2023, and was Minister for Defence Veterans, Reserves and Personnel at the Ministry of Defence from 2017 to 2019. Prior to his political career, Ellwood served in the Royal Green Jackets and reached the rank of captain. He transferred to the Army Reserve and has gone on to reach the rank of lieutenant colonel in the 77th Brigade.

== Early life and career ==
Tobias Ellwood was born on 12 August 1966 in New York to British parents, Ellwood was educated at schools in Bonn and Vienna, where he attended the fee-paying Vienna International School. He attended Loughborough University from 1985 to 1990, and became a sabbatical officer at Loughborough Students' Union. He graduated with a bachelor's degree and later attended the Cass Business School at City University from 1997 to 1998 where he received a Master of Business Administration degree (MBA).

While a member of the University Officers' Training Corps (UOTC), Ellwood was commissioned as a second lieutenant in the Territorial Army in 1989. After completing the Regular Army commissioning course at Sandhurst he joined the Royal Green Jackets in 1991, and transferred from the active list to the Reserve of Officers in 1996 having reached the rank of captain.

After leaving the Regular Army he became a researcher to the Conservative MP Tom King. He was elected chairman of the Hertfordshire South West Conservative Association for a year in 1998.

== Parliamentary career ==
Ellwood was elected as a councillor on Dacorum Borough Council in Hertfordshire in 1999. At the 2001 general election he stood for election in Worsley, being defeated by the sitting Labour MP Terry Lewis by 11,787 votes and winning 23.8% of the vote. He was selected to contest the safe Conservative seat of Bournemouth East to succeed David Atkinson. He was elected at the 2005 general election with a majority of 5,244 votes and with 45% of the vote.

A supporter of David Cameron's campaign for the leadership of the Conservative Party, Ellwood was appointed to the Opposition Whips Office in December 2005. In the July 2007 reshuffle, Cameron promoted Ellwood to his frontbench team as Shadow Minister for Culture, Media and Sport, with specific responsibilities for gambling, licensing and tourism. He was criticised in the press after reportedly describing Liverpudlian landlords taking over pubs in his constituency as "criminals" in 2009; Ellwood said the comments had been taken out of context.

Ellwood was re-elected at the 2010 general election with an increased vote share of 48.4% and an increased majority of 7,728. Following the election he was appointed Parliamentary Private Secretary (PPS) to then Defence Secretary, Liam Fox, and in October 2011 was appointed PPS to David Lidington, Minister for Europe at the Foreign and Commonwealth Office. In October 2013, Ellwood was appointed PPS to Health Secretary, Jeremy Hunt. On 15 July 2014, Ellwood was appointed as Parliamentary Under-Secretary of State for the Middle East, Africa and FCO Services.

Ellwood has also been appointed a Member of the Parliamentary Delegation to the NATO Assembly, 2014 and Parliamentary Advisor to the Prime Minister for the 2014 NATO Summit. He is a proponent of "double summer time".

In 2011, Ellwood served on the Special Select Committee set up to scrutinise the Bill which became the Armed Forces Act 2011. He was also a member of the Public Bill Committee for the Defence Reform Act 2014.

In May 2014, he was one of seven unsuccessful candidates for the chairmanship of the House of Commons Defence Select Committee.

In 2015, he backed the move by IPSA to increase salaries for politicians by 10% when the rest of the public sector were on a freeze of 1%. He apologised for any offence caused by the comment that without the proposed raise to his £90,000 salary he would be "watching the pennies" but also reminded people that he had taken a salary cut when becoming an MP.

In the 2015 general election, Ellwood was re-elected with an increased vote share of 49% and an increased majority of 14,612.

In September 2015, the Independent Parliamentary Standards Authority named Ellwood and 25 current and former MPs who failed to settle a total of approximately £2,000 the previous year in overclaimed expenses, forcing them to be written off. The debts ranged from £309 to £7.50. The expenses claim that Ellwood had submitted of £26.50 was subsequently settled.

Ellwood voted to remain in the 2016 EU referendum. He later stated that the leave result should nevertheless be respected and that the government should not try to reverse this decision.

On 22 March 2017, during a terrorist attack on Parliament, Ellwood gave mouth-to-mouth resuscitation and CPR to police officer Keith Palmer, who later died of his injuries. Ellwood was called a "hero" by those at Westminster and the press, as photos surfaced of him with blood on his face while he crouched over the body of the dying police officer. Consequently, Ellwood received widespread praise on social media for his actions, as well as being promised an appointment to the Privy Council for his response in the attack. This gave him the honorific prefix "The Right Honourable".

Ellwood was again re-elected at the snap 2017 general election with an increased vote share of 51.9% and a decreased majority of 7,937.

In November 2018, George Papadopoulos accused Ellwood of spying on the 2016 presidential campaign of Donald Trump and passing on information to U.S. intelligence, a claim which Ellwood denied.

In 2018, Ellwood was placed at 100/1 to be the next Conservative Party leader. He did not stand in the 2019 leadership election, but instead endorsed Matt Hancock, then subsequently Rory Stewart.

Ellwood was again re-elected at the 2019 general election with a decreased vote share of 50.6% and an increased majority of 8,806.

In December 2020, during the COVID-19 pandemic, Ellwood urged the government not to relax the rules governing social mixing over the Christmas period, then attended a Christmas party at the Cavalry and Guards Club in London with 26 other people. He was criticised for his decision to attend by Home Secretary Priti Patel, who said, "Having dinner... outside of the rules with a large number of people is a breach of the regulations."

In June 2022, he sent a letter of no confidence in the Conservative Party leadership of Boris Johnson to the 1922 Committee. In early July 2022, he told the Bournemouth Daily Echo that he was not interested in standing in the upcoming leadership election.

On 19 July 2022, Ellwood lost the Conservative whip for failing to support the government in a vote of confidence the day before. He was in Moldova to meet the President, Maia Sandu, and was unable to travel back. He was initially not eligible to vote in the remaining MP rounds of the Conservative Party leadership election but, as a Conservative Party member, could vote in the final round. He was granted a "momentary return of the whip" so he could vote in the final MP round. He voted for Penny Mordaunt. In the closing stages of the Conservative Party leadership contest, reports emerged that moderate Tories feared a Liz Truss government. On 4 September 2022 (the night before Truss was confirmed as Conservative Party Leader), Ellwood published an article on Politics Home appealing to colleagues to move closer to the political centre ground.

In the October 2022 Conservative Party leadership election, Ellwood supported Rishi Sunak.

In July 2023, Ellwood called on both the Conservatives and Labour to speak in favour of the idea that the United Kingdom needed to rejoin the Single Market to secure its economic prosperity.

On 17 July 2023, Ellwood published a video statement praising Taliban rule in the Islamic Emirate of Afghanistan for "vastly improving" the security of the country, introducing agricultural reforms, and promoting solar energy, while urging engagement with the Taliban to avoid Afghanistan becoming a "Chinese vassal". The statement was condemned by other Conservatives, including Iain Duncan Smith and Mark Francois. Several days after publishing the video Ellwood apologised for his "poor communications" and said " I’m very, very sorry that my reflection of my visit could have been much better worded and have been taken out of context". On 20 July, members of the Commons Defence Committee tabled a motion of no confidence in Ellwood, with the vote to remove him from the committee scheduled to take place on 14 September. Ellwood resigned his position as head of the Commons Defence Committee on 13 September, before the motion took place.

In the 2024 United Kingdom general election, he lost his seat to Tom Hayes of the Labour Party.

== Ongoing military career ==
In September 2018, Ellwood announced that he had been promoted to the rank of lieutenant colonel as a reservist in the 77th Brigade, based at Denison Barracks, Hermitage, Berkshire, a psychological operations unit responsible for 'non-lethal' warfare which disseminates government-friendly podcasts and videos.

== Post-parliamentary career ==
Since his defeat at the 2024 general election, Elwood has worked as a freelance consultant. Elwood is also a frequent commentator, especially on issues relating to Defence.

== In popular culture ==
Elwood was portrayed by Alastair Mackenzie in the 2025 BBC One mini-series Prisoner 951, which recounted the imprisonment and eventual release of Nazanin Zaghari-Ratcliffe.

== Personal life ==
In July 2005, Ellwood married Hannah Ryan, a corporate lawyer. They have two sons. Ellwood has a sister, Charlotte Ellwood-Aris. His brother, Jonathan, who was director of studies at the International School Ho Chi Minh City in Vietnam, was killed in the 2002 Bali bombing.

In June 2009, Ellwood was attacked by a group of youths after confronting them for playing football in the street. The gang threw stones at him and Ellwood was punched in the head. A 17-year-old male was arrested over the attack. The arrestee was later given a two-year community order. Ellwood expressed relief that the youth was not sent to jail.

In July 2022, whilst driving, Ellwood allegedly ran over a cat in his home neighbourhood, then failed to stop. He claimed to have been unaware that he had run over the cat. His house was later attacked.

== Honours ==
Ribbon	Description	Notes
	Queen Elizabeth II Golden Jubilee Medal	2002; British version of this medal
	Queen Elizabeth II Diamond Jubilee Medal	2012; British version of this medal
	Queen Elizabeth II Platinum Jubilee Medal	2022; British version of this medal
	King Charles III Coronation Medal	2023; British Version of this Medal
	Volunteer Reserves Service Medal	10 Years' Service in the Army Reserves

== Publications ==
Ellwood has written the following recent publications:

- Post Conflict Reconstruction – Bridging the gap between Military and Civilian Affairs on the Modern Battlefield (November 2009)
- Time to Change the Clocks – Arguing the case for moving our clocks forward (November 2010)-
- Upgrading UK influence in the European Union – A strategy to improve upstream scrutiny of EU legislation (November 2012)
- Stabilizing Afghanistan: Proposals for Improving Security, Governance, and Aid/Economic Development – Atlantic Council (April 2013)
- Leveraging UK Carrier Capability (September 2013)
- Improving Efficiency, Interoperability and Resilience of our Blue Light Services (December 2013)

Parliament of the United Kingdom
Preceded by David Atkinson	Member of Parliament for Bournemouth East; 2005–2024	Succeeded by Tom Hayes
