= Iford, Dorset =

Coordinates: 50.740°N 1.808°W

Iford
- Location within Dorset
- OS grid reference: SZ135934
- Unitary authority: Bournemouth, Christchurch and Poole
- Ceremonial county: Dorset
- Region: South West
- Country: England
- Sovereign state: United Kingdom
- Post town: BOURNEMOUTH
- Postcode district: BH6, BH7
- Dialling code: 01202
- Police: Dorset
- Fire: Dorset and Wiltshire
- Ambulance: South Western
- UK Parliament: Bournemouth East

Iford (/ˈaɪfərd/) is a suburb of Bournemouth, situated in the eastern part of the borough. It is also known as a bridging point over the River Stour, connecting Bournemouth with Christchurch.

The parish church of St Saviour's was built in 1935–36.

== Politics ==
Iford is part of the Littledown and Iford ward for elections to Bournemouth, Christchurch and Poole Council which elect two councillors.

Iford is part of the Bournemouth East parliamentary constituency, for elections to the House of Commons of the United Kingdom.
