= David Atkinson (politician) =

British politician

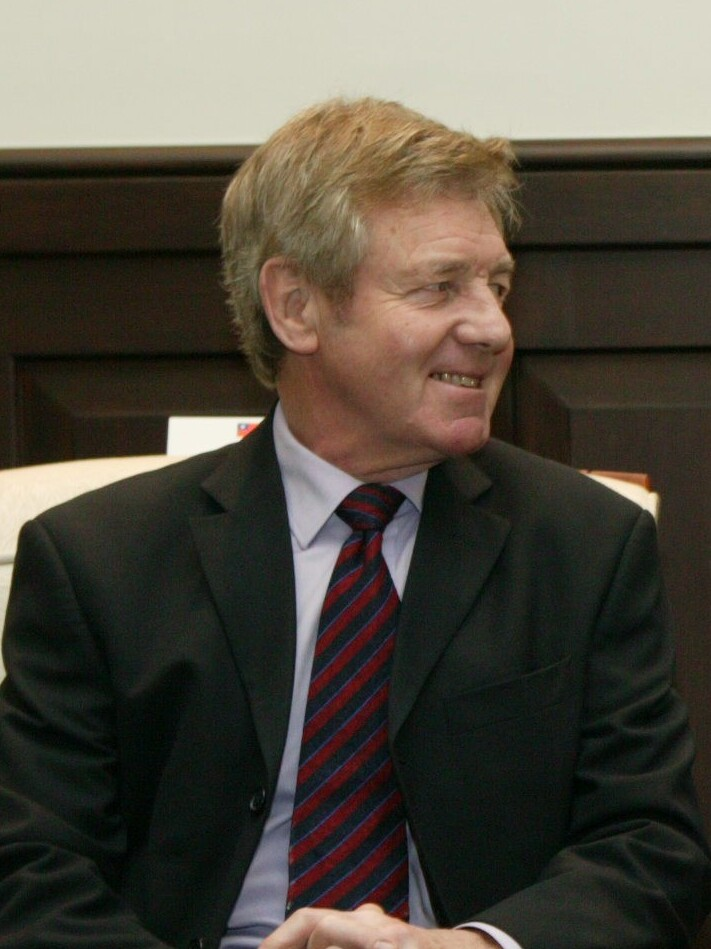
- Atkinson in 2005

Member of Parliament for Bournemouth East
- In office 25 November 1977 – 11 April 2005
- Preceded by: John Cordle
- Succeeded by: Tobias Ellwood

Personal details
- Born: David Anthony Atkinson; 24 March 1940 Essex, England
- Died: 23 January 2012 (aged 71)
- Party: Conservative
- Spouse: Sue Pilsworth (m. 1968; div. 1992)
- Domestic partner: Robert Reid (2011–2012)
- Children: 2

David Anthony Atkinson (24 March 1940 – 23 January 2012) was a British Conservative politician who served as Member of Parliament (MP) for Bournemouth East from a 1977 by-election until he stepped down at the 2005 general election.

== Early life ==
Born in Westcliff-on-Sea, Atkinson attended St George's College, Weybridge and Southend College of Technology. He later trained at the Chelsea College of Aeronautical and Automobile Engineering in Chelsea where he gained a Diploma in Automobile Engineering and Motor Trade Management. From 1963–72, he was Director of Chalkwell Motor Co. Ltd in Leigh-on-Sea, and from 1973–77 he worked for David Graham Studios Ltd in printing, marketing, artwork and design.

== Parliamentary career ==
Atkinson was national chairman of the Young Conservatives from 1970 until 1971, more right-wing than the long line of his moderate predecessors and successors. He contested the Newham North West constituency in February 1974 and Basildon in October 1974.

Atkinson became an MP at the 1977 Bournemouth East by-election, retaining the seat for his party. He served as PPS to Paul Channon and was a vociferous supporter of corporal punishment and was nearly dismissed for voting against the Government in its support.

He supported local causes such as AFC Bournemouth during their financial troubles. Atkinson was vocal in his criticism of the Soviet Union and active in a number of international forums aimed at highlighting communist abuse of human rights. He was less critical of South Africa's apartheid regime, calling for the lifting of sanctions and objected to the pressures being placed upon the South African Government.

The Independent reported that Atkinson was invited on a visit to South Africa by Strategy Network International, the lobby group fronted by Derek Laud, the ex Monday Club member and protege of Michael Brown: "John Carlile, Mr Colvin and David Atkinson, who led an SNI delegation to observe the Angolan peace process in 1992, a year before the firm closed."

== Personal life ==
Atkinson married Susan Pilsworth in 1968 and divorced in 1992. They had a son and a daughter. He came out as gay and entered into a civil partnership in 2011. His wife discovered he had been in a relationship with footballer Justin Fashanu when Fashanu came out as gay and said he had had an affair with an unnamed, married Conservative MP whom he had met in a London gay bar. After confronting Atkinson, he revealed he was gay and had been in a series of gay relationships.

His son, Anthony, at first accused him of being a sexual predator and said Geoffrey Dickens had stayed at the Atkinson family home. He said he believed his father had been named in the missing Westminster paedophile dossier compiled by Dickens.

Anthony Atkinson later qualified his statement to say his father had not been engaged in activity that equated to the scope and scale of Jimmy Savile's alleged activities, saying he had no evidence that his father ever had relations with anyone under-aged.

== Death ==
In 2011, Atkinson underwent an operation after he was diagnosed with bowel cancer. He died on 23 January 2012 at the age of 71.

Parliament of the United Kingdom
Preceded by John Cordle	Member of Parliament for Bournemouth East; 1977–2005	Succeeded by Tobias Ellwood
