= Holy Epiphany Church, Muscliff =

Church in Bournemouth, Dorset, England

Holy Epiphany Church
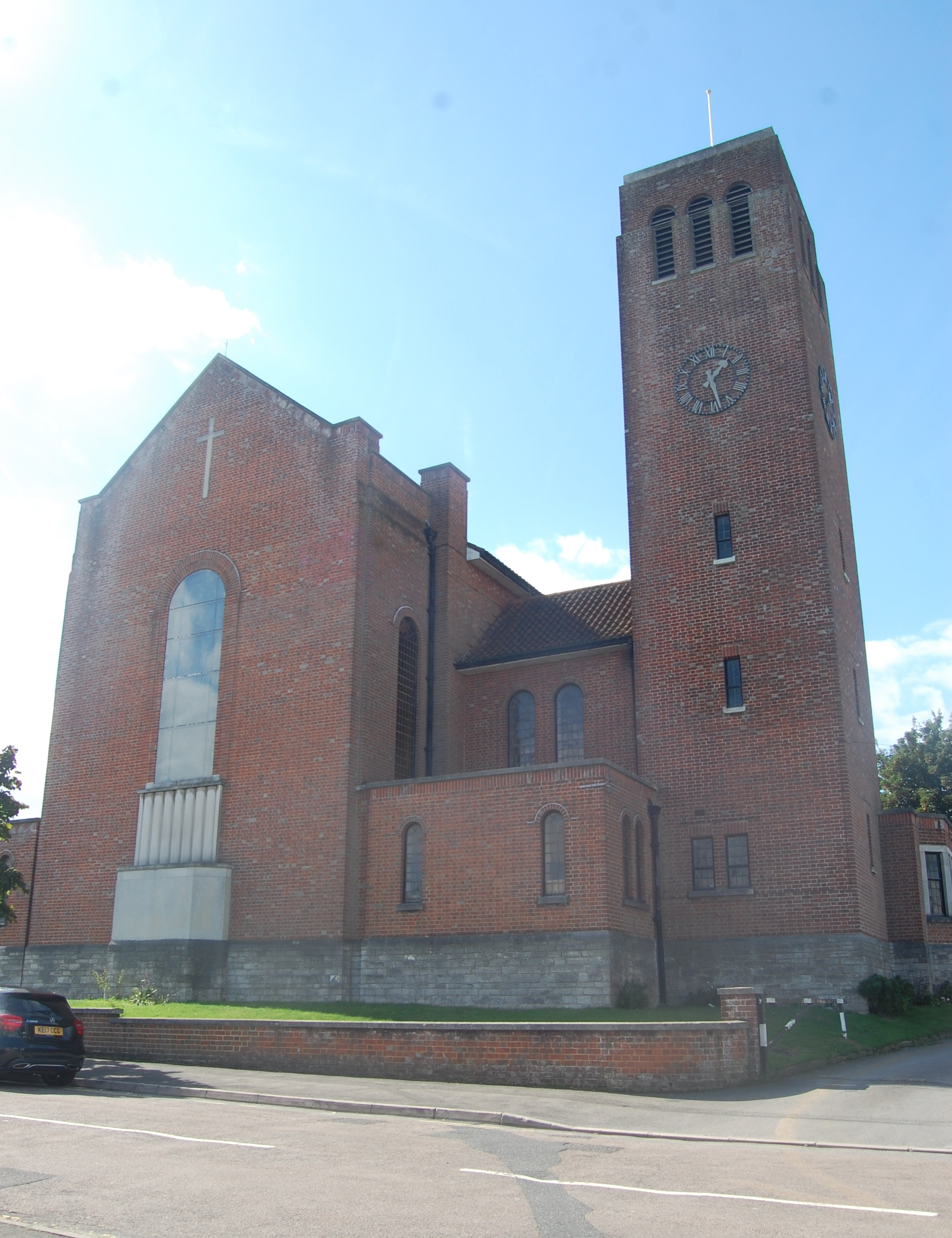
- Holy Epiphany Church in 2022

Religion
- Affiliation: Anglicanism
- Ecclesiastical or organizational status: active

Location
- Location: Redbreast Road North, Muscliff, Bournemouth, Dorset, England
- Interactive map of Holy Epiphany Church
- Coordinates: 50.758508°N 1.868643°W

Architecture
- Type: Church
- Style: Brutalist architecture
- Completed: 1953
- Materials: Red brick

Website
- www.christchurchwestbourne.com

The Holy Epiphany Church is a church in the Muscliff area of Bournemouth, Dorset, England.

== History ==
The red brick church was built in 1953 to serve the areas of Muscliff and upper Moordown. The church has a plain interior with a high barrelled roof. The organ, which was built in 1879 by Harrison & Harrison for St Mary Magdalene's Church in Dundee, was moved in its entirety to the church in 1954 by Henry Willis & Co. In 2013, the church was ransacked in a robbery.

== Gallery ==
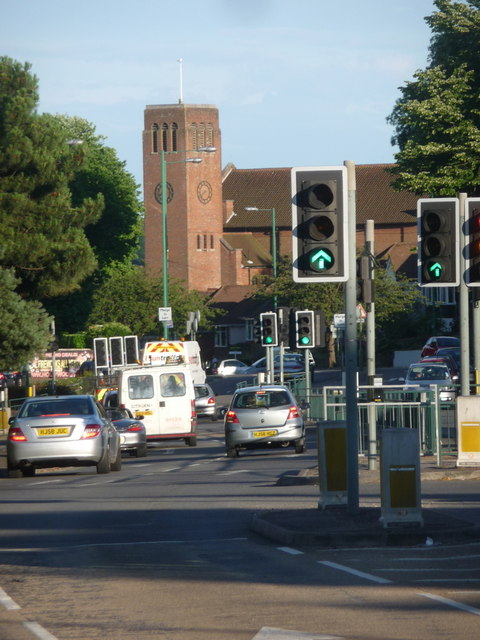
Approach

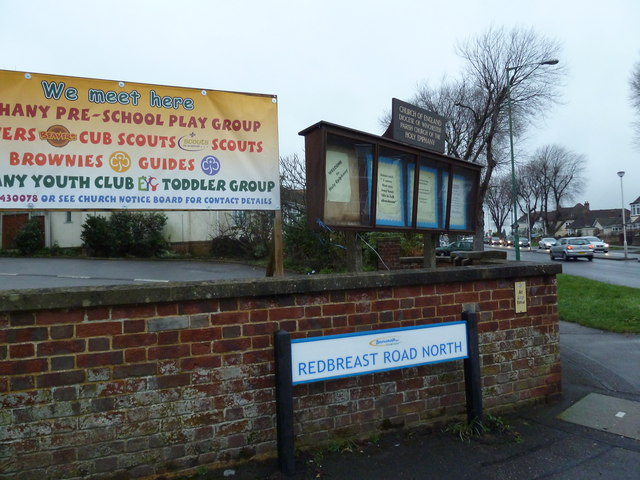
Noticeboard

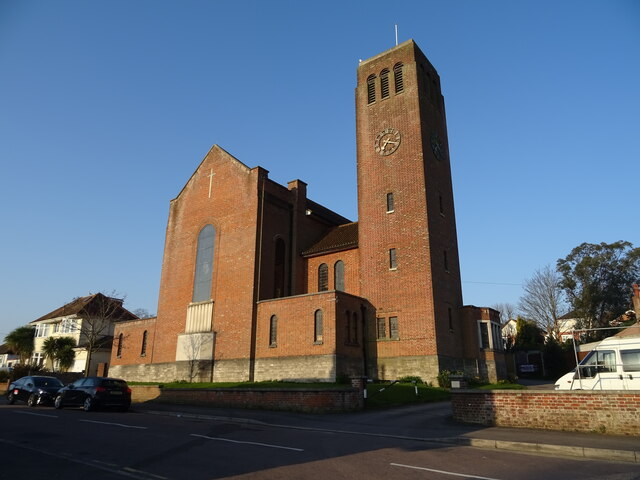
2022

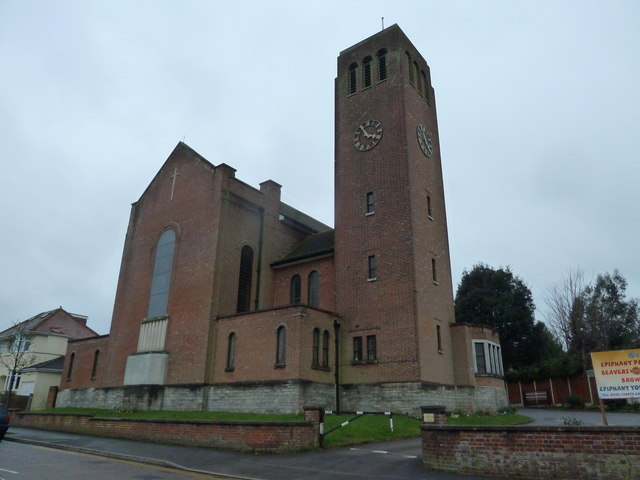
2013

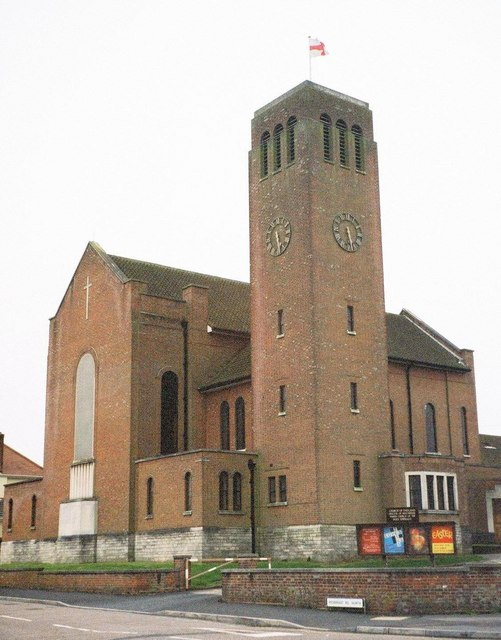
2005

== See also ==
- List of churches in Bournemouth
- List of Anglican churches
