= David Buckle =

British trade unionist and politician

David J. Buckle (1924 – 21 January 2017) was a British trade unionist and politician.

Born in London, Buckle was placed for adoption and grew up in an unofficial children's home, first in Streatham, and then in Ramsgate. He was thrown out at the age of 12, when his father stopped paying for his keep. He was permitted to stay in a local church, acting as a caretaker without pay, before in 1941 finding work as a farm labourer.

In 1943, Buckle joined the Royal Marines, and was present at the capture of Karl Doenitz. He was a sergeant by 1946, when he left the service. He began working as a welder in Cowley, and joined the Transport and General Workers' Union (TGWU). He largely overcame a stammer, and studied English and politics at an adult education centre.

Buckle joined the Labour Party, and in 1951 was elected to Radley Parish Council. At the 1955 UK general election, he stood in Bournemouth East and Christchurch, taking 23.4% of the vote and second place. He stood in Banbury at the 1959 UK general election, where he took 37.8%.

At work, Buckle led a lengthy campaign to replace piecework with a set wage. In 1964, he was appointed as the TGWU's Oxford District secretary, in which he was an opponent of Trotskyists in the union. He served in the post until his retirement in 1988, when he was made a Member of the Order of the British Empire. The following year, he was elected to Oxfordshire County Council, and he became its chair in 1996/97. He stood down in 2001, then served on the UK Older People Advisory Group until 2010.
