= Bournemouth East and Christchurch =

Former parliamentary constituency in the United Kingdom

- Former borough constituency for the House of Commons
- County: Hampshire

1950–February 1974
- Seats: One
- Created from: Bournemouth, and New Forest and Christchurch
- Replaced by: Bournemouth East and Christchurch & Lymington

Bournemouth East and Christchurch is a former United Kingdom Parliamentary constituency. It returned one Member of Parliament, using the first-past-the-post electoral system from the 1950 United Kingdom general election until the constituency was abolished in 1974.

The seat was based upon the eastern part of the seaside resort of Bournemouth and the neighbouring town of Christchurch, which were united for parliamentary purposes in 1950. The constituency was in the south west of the historic county of Hampshire in South East England.

It was held by the Conservative Party for the entirety of its existence, with the party gaining more than half of the votes cast at each election.

== Boundaries ==
The County Borough of Bournemouth wards of Boscombe East, Boscombe West, King's Park, Queen's Park, Southbourne, and West Southbourne, and the Borough of Christchurch.

Before 1918 the County Borough of Bournemouth formed part of the then parliamentary borough of Christchurch. Under the Representation of the People Act 1918, Bournemouth became a single-member constituency, with the same boundaries as the then county borough. Christchurch became part of the new New Forest and Christchurch constituency.

In the 1950 redistribution of parliamentary seats, the Representation of the People Act 1948 provided for the division of Bournemouth and Christchurch into Bournemouth East and Christchurch and Bournemouth West.

In the 1974 redistribution, this constituency disappeared. The two new seats of Bournemouth East & Christchurch and Lymington then came into existence.

== Members of Parliament ==
| Election | Member | Party | Notes |
|---|---|---|---|
| 1950 | Brendan Bracken | Conservative | Previously MP for Bournemouth from by-election in 1945. Resigned January 1952 on being raised to the peerage |
| 1952 by-election | Nigel Nicolson | Conservative | |
| 1959 | John Cordle | Conservative | |
| Feb 1974 | constituency abolished: see Bournemouth East & Christchurch and Lymington | | |

== Elections ==
=== Elections in the 1950s ===
General election 1950: Bournemouth East and Christchurch
| Party | Candidate | Votes | % | ±% |
|---|---|---|---|---|
| Conservative | Brendan Bracken | 27,677 | 58.81 | |
| Labour | Dodo Lees | 12,790 | 27.18 | |
| Liberal | James Charles Holland | 6,594 | 14.01 | |
| Majority | | 14,887 | 31.63 | |
| Turnout | | 47,061 | 84.98 | |
| Conservative win (new seat) | | | | |

General election 1951: Bournemouth East and Christchurch
| Party | Candidate | Votes | % | ±% |
|---|---|---|---|---|
| Conservative | Brendan Bracken | 29,138 | 63.31 | |
| Labour | Hallam J. Barnes | 11,550 | 25.09 | |
| Liberal | James Charles Holland | 5,338 | 11.60 | |
| Majority | | 17,588 | 38.22 | |
| Turnout | | 46,026 | 80.84 | |
| Conservative hold | | Swing | | |

1952 Bournemouth East and Christchurch by-election
| Party | Candidate | Votes | % | ±% |
|---|---|---|---|---|
| Conservative | Nigel Nicolson | 22,480 | 61.85 | −1.46 |
| Labour | R. D. Rees | 8,498 | 23.38 | −1.71 |
| Liberal | James Charles Holland | 3,673 | 10.11 | −1.49 |
| Independent | S. Kermode | 1,693 | 4.66 | New |
| Majority | | 13,982 | 38.47 | +0.25 |
| Turnout | | 36,334 | | |
| Conservative hold | | Swing | | |

General election 1955: Bournemouth East and Christchurch
| Party | Candidate | Votes | % | ±% |
|---|---|---|---|---|
| Conservative | Nigel Nicolson | 28,757 | 65.55 | |
| Labour | David Buckle | 10,259 | 23.39 | |
| Liberal | Brian Patrick Molony | 4,851 | 11.06 | |
| Majority | | 18,498 | 42.16 | |
| Turnout | | 43,867 | 75.51 | |
| Conservative hold | | Swing | | |

General election 1959: Bournemouth East and Christchurch
| Party | Candidate | Votes | % | ±% |
|---|---|---|---|---|
| Conservative | John Cordle | 29,014 | 62.34 | |
| Labour | Jack D. Rutland | 9,222 | 19.81 | |
| Liberal | W.J. Wareham | 8,308 | 17.85 | |
| Majority | | 19,792 | 42.53 | |
| Turnout | | 46,544 | 76.73 | |
| Conservative hold | | Swing | | |

=== Elections in the 1960s ===
General election 1964: Bournemouth East and Christchurch
| Party | Candidate | Votes | % | ±% |
|---|---|---|---|---|
| Conservative | John Cordle | 26,852 | 56.41 | |
| Labour | Alan G. Reynard | 10,447 | 21.95 | |
| Liberal | Alastair Campbell McLeish | 10,304 | 21.65 | |
| Majority | | 16,405 | 34.46 | |
| Turnout | | 47,603 | 74.67 | |
| Conservative hold | | Swing | | |

General election 1966: Bournemouth East and Christchurch
| Party | Candidate | Votes | % | ±% |
|---|---|---|---|---|
| Conservative | John Cordle | 27,047 | 55.95 | |
| Labour | Clive S. Sabel | 12,598 | 26.06 | |
| Liberal | Alastair Campbell McLeish | 8,698 | 17.99 | |
| Majority | | 14,449 | 29.89 | |
| Turnout | | 48,343 | 74.71 | |
| Conservative hold | | Swing | | |

=== Elections in the 1970s ===
General election 1970: Bournemouth East and Christchurch
| Party | Candidate | Votes | % | ±% |
|---|---|---|---|---|
| Conservative | John Cordle | 31,104 | 62.36 | |
| Labour | Tony C. Bisson | 10,594 | 21.24 | |
| Liberal | George K. Musgrave | 8,182 | 16.40 | |
| Majority | | 20,510 | 41.12 | |
| Turnout | | 49,880 | 70.80 | |
| Conservative hold | | Swing | | |

== See also ==
- List of former United Kingdom Parliament constituencies
