= Tom Hayes (British politician) =

British Labour Party politician

Tom Hayes MP
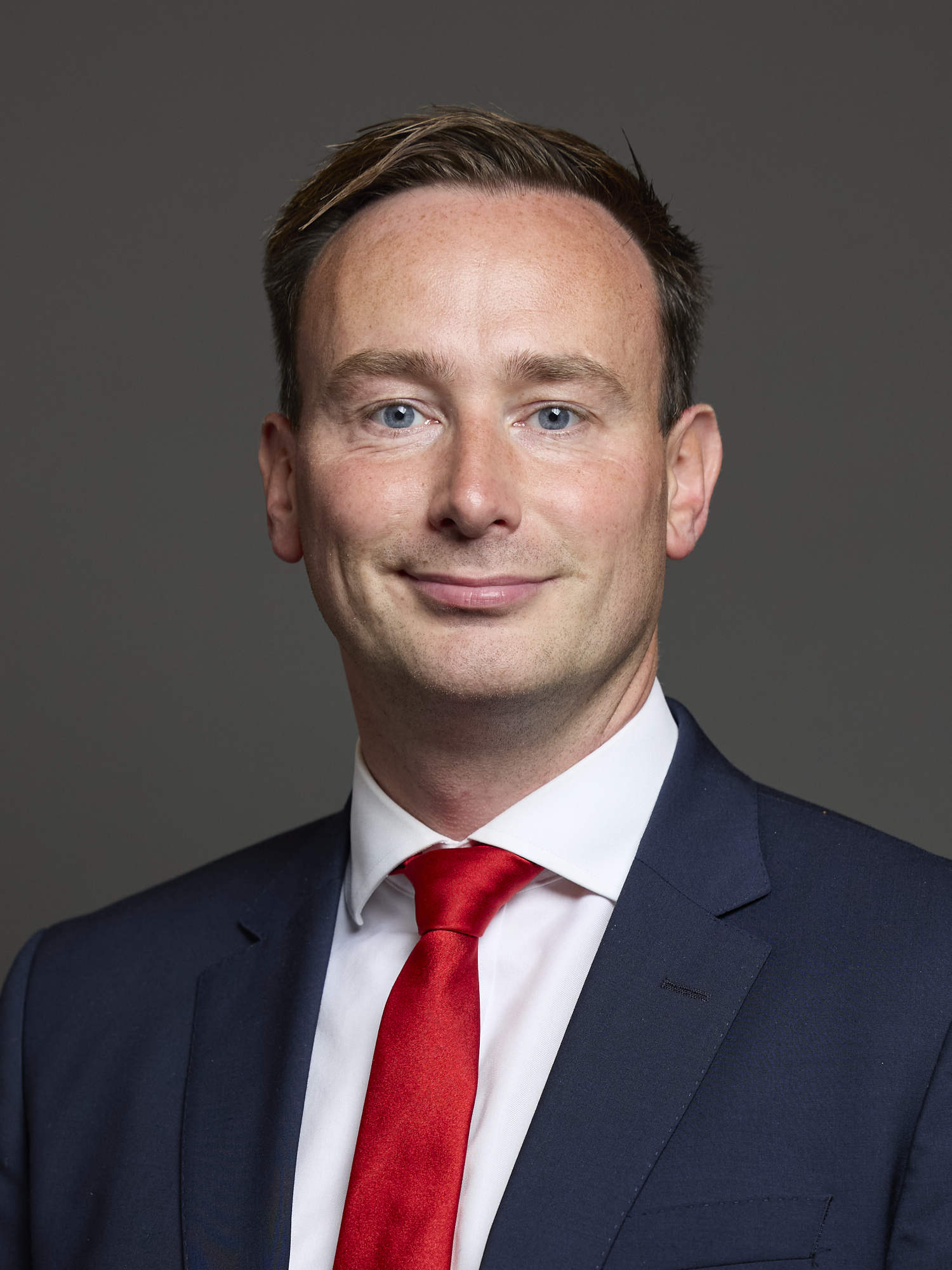
- Official portrait, 2024

Member of Parliament for Bournemouth East
- Incumbent
- Assumed office 4 July 2024
- Preceded by: Tobias Ellwood
- Majority: 5,479 (12.2%)

Personal details
- Born: 26 February 1983 (age 43) Salford, Greater Manchester
- Party: Labour
- Education: University of Manchester; University of Cambridge; Yale University

Thomas John Hayes is a British Labour Party politician who was elected MP for Bournemouth East in the 2024 general election.

== Political career ==
Hayes was Labour and Co-operative Party Councillor for St Clement's Ward on Oxford City Council from 2014 to 2024. He was deputy council leader and Zero Carbon cabinet member in charge of the zero emission zone.

At the 2020 Councillor Awards, run by the Local Government Information Unit and CCLA, Hayes was named the 'Environment and Sustainability Pioneer' of the year among local authority figures.

As Deputy Leader, he led Oxford City Council's collaboration with EDF Renewables, Habitat Energy, redT, Kensa, and the University of Oxford on the Energy Superhub Oxford project, which saw the creation of Europe's most powerful electric charging hub. The project is set to unlock significant emissions reductions across power, heat, and transport. It is saving 10,000 tonnes of carbon dioxide a year, rising to 25,000 tonnes by 2032. As part of the project, 57 council homes were upgraded with ground-source heatpumps. The Energy Oxford Superhub opened at Redbridge Park and Ride in 2022, offering rapid charging for 42 vehicles at once.

In 2020, Hayes led Oxford City Council to set an Air Quality Action Plan designed to go further than the government’s legal target for air pollution by becoming the first UK local authority to set out a city-wide air pollution reduction target.

In 2021, Hayes led the establishment of the Zero Carbon Oxford Partnership and served as its chair. Their Roadmap and Action Plan models a pathway to net-zero 10 years ahead of the UK’s Government’s legal targets. This followed the first Citizens' Assembly on Climate Change by a UK city, which Hayes led to conclusion.

In the same year, Hayes committed Oxford City Council to spend over £50m in improving the energy efficiency of its 7,800 council housing stock to meet at least the EPC Band C standard by 2030. In the same year, he led the pedestrianisation of Broad Street in the city centre and committed £3.3m on behalf of Oxford City Council to the Low Carbon Hub to develop a ground-mounted solar park in Ray Valley capable of generating enough clean electricity to power more than 6,000 homes.

In 2022, Hayes worked to submit a successful bid to deliver a new fleet of 159 state-of-the-art electric buses for the Oxford area.

He stood down as Deputy Leader in order to be a Labour candidate in the 2022 Stretford and Urmston by-election but was not shortlisted.

In December 2022, he was selected as the prospective parliamentary candidate for the 2024 general election for Bournemouth East. During his campaigning, he was caught on video stealing a leaflet

In the July general election he won the Bournemouth East constituency unseating the Conservative MP Tobias Ellwood. He won with a majority of 5,479 votes.

In his maiden speech on 10 October 2024, Hayes told Parliament that he would ‘fight to bring green investment’ to Bournemouth. He has voted for measures that crack down on water bosses who pollute, and sought investment to upgrade local water infrastructure.

In January 2025, Hayes held a debate in Parliament on the provision of playgrounds by local authorities, where he called for the government to implement the first National Play Strategy since 2008. Launching the first ever all-party parliamentary group on play in May 2025, he called for a ‘play sufficiency duty’ in England to match those in Wales and Scotland.

== Political views ==
After being elected as an MP, Hayes said he plans to work with police to make Bournemouth safer following concerns the town is "particularly" unsafe for women and girls. In Parliament, he has supported the Domestic Abuse (Safe Leave) Bill brought by Alex McIntyre, MP for Gloucester. If passed, the law would give survivors of domestic abuse the right to time off from work.

Hayes has been outspoken in his support for better housing in his constituency. In March 2025, he launched a campaign to improve the quality of privately rented accommodation in Bournemouth. In Parliament, he has called for reforms to the leasehold industry to protect leaseholders.

Hayes supports the introduction of a proportional voting system. He has also joined calls for tighter regulations on political donations from foreign nationals, and the end of tax havens in UK Overseas Territories.

== Personal life ==
Hayes grew up in Salford. He attended All Hallows R.C. High School and Pendleton College before studying politics and modern history at the University of Manchester. He graduated with an M.Phil in international studies at the University of Cambridge before becoming a Fox International Fellow in international and area studies at Yale University.

He was chief executive of mental health, domestic abuse, and homelessness charity Elmore Community Services. At the charity, he helped develop mental health services for older adults during the pandemic, and third-sector mental health support for NHS personality disorder services.

He is openly gay.
