= St Saviour's Church, Iford =

Church in Iford, Dorset, England

St Saviour's Church
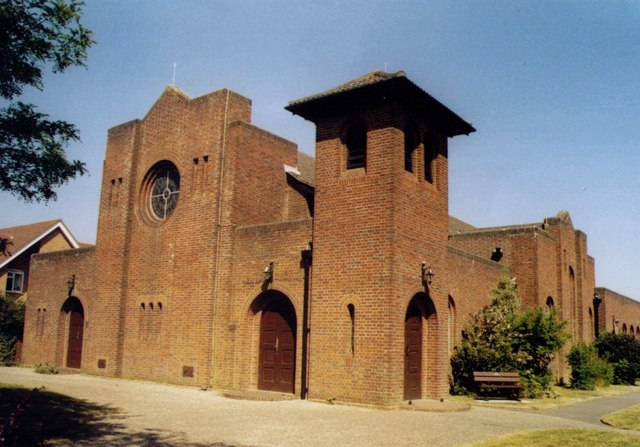

Religion
- Affiliation: Church of England
- Ecclesiastical or organizational status: Active
- Year consecrated: 1936

Location
- Location: Iford, Dorset, England
- Interactive map of St Saviour's Church
- Coordinates: 50.7393°N 1.8149°W

Architecture
- Type: Church

St Saviour's Church is a Church of England parish church in Iford, Dorset, England. It was designed by Frederic W. Lawrence and opened in 1936.

== History ==
St Saviour's was built to serve Iford, a suburb of Bournemouth, at a time when the small settlement was undergoing rapid expansion. The population had reached 5,000 by 1934 and expansion was set to double this number over the following few years. In February 1934, the Rev. C. W. C. Browne appealed before a meeting of the Bournemouth Ruri-Decanal Conference for £10,000 to construct a church. By February 1936, £7,080 had been raised towards the £9,500 building fund, while in September only £1,000 remained to be found.

Mr. Frederic W. Lawrence of Bournemouth drew up the plans for the church which was influenced by Romanesque architecture. The foundation stone was laid on 14 August 1935 and the church was built by Mr. Frank Grigg & Sons. St Saviour's was consecrated by the Bishop of Winchester, the Right Rev. Cyril Garbett, on 22 September 1936. Described by the Bournemouth Graphic as a "most impressive ceremonial", the consecration marked the formation of Iford as a parish and St Saviour's as the parish church.

== Architecture ==
St Saviour's is built of multi-coloured bricks, with the interior walls rendered in plaster and the roof of tiles and asphalt. It was designed to seat 462 persons and made up of a nave, north and south aisle, chancel, Lady chapel, organ chamber, choir vestry, clergy vestry, warden's room and two west porches. In 1994, a two-storey church hall was built next to the church and won the Civic Trust Awards for its design. The hall was connected to the church with a modern style glass panelled building called the Link in 2012.

== Activity in the community ==
St Saviours is well known in the community for its annual Halloween alternative "Light Party" as well as its Christmas Christingle services. It also actively aims to be a key part in the community with weekly social events and groups for people of all ages. They employ both a youth worker and a children's worker which provide weekly groups for young people in the area, but also have groups targeting over 60s, and everything in between.
