= 1952 Bournemouth East and Christchurch by-election =

UK parliamentary by-election

The 1952 Bournemouth East and Christchurch by-election of 6 February 1952 was held after Conservative Member of Parliament (MP) Brendan Bracken was elevated to the House of Lords. The seat was retained by the Conservatives.

== Result ==
Bournemouth East and Christchurch, 1952
Party	Candidate	Votes	%	±%
Conservative	Nigel Nicolson	22,480	61.85	−1.46
Labour	R. D. Rees	8,498	23.38	−1.71
Liberal	James Charles Holland	3,673	10.11	−1.49
Independent	S. Kermode	1,693	4.66	New
Majority		13,982	38.47	+0.26
Turnout		36,334		
Conservative hold		Swing		

== Previous result ==
General election 1951: Bournemouth East and Christchurch
Party	Candidate	Votes	%	±%
Conservative	Brendan Bracken	29,138	63.31	
Labour	Hallam J. Barnes	11,550	25.09	
Liberal	James Charles Holland	5,338	11.60	
Majority		17,588	38.21	
Turnout		46,026	80.84	
Conservative hold		Swing		
