= 1977 Bournemouth East by-election =

UK parliamentary by-election

The 1977 Bournemouth East by election was a by election for the Parliament of the United Kingdom held on Thursday, 24 November 1977 after the resignation of John Cordle following his criticism by a Select committee for business links to corrupt architect John Poulson.

Cordle had been elected at the October 1974 general election for the Conservative Party with a majority of 10,661 votes over the Liberal Party.

== Result ==
Bournemouth East by-election, 1977
Party	Candidate	Votes	%	±%
Conservative	David Atkinson	15,235	62.14	+10.38
Labour	Joseph Goodwin	3,684	15.02	−5.95
Liberal	Donald Matthew	3,212	13.10	−12.12
New Britain	John Pratt	1,127	4.60	New
National Front	Kenneth McKilliam	725	2.96	+0.9
International Marxist	Brian Heron	494	2.01	New
Democratic Monarchist, Public Safety, White Resident	Bill Boaks	42	0.17	New
Majority		11,551	47.1	+20.6
Turnout		24,025	42.6	−27.9
Conservative hold		Swing		

== Previous result ==
General election October 1974: Bournemouth East
Party	Candidate	Votes	%	±%
Conservative	John Cordle	20,790	51.76	+1.56
Liberal	G. K. Musgrave	10,129	25.22	−4.03
Labour	D. E. Lock	8,422	20.97	+4.27
National Front	M. Hayes	828	2.06	+0.09
Majority		10,661	26.54	+5.59
Turnout		40,149	70.46	−8.14
Conservative hold		Swing		

== Outcome ==
David Atkinson served in the House of Commons until he stood down at the 2005 general election. He was succeeded by retired Army Major Tobias Ellwood, also from the Conservative Party.
