= Castlepoint Shopping Centre =

Castlepoint
- Location: Strouden Park, Bournemouth, Dorset, United Kingdom
- Coordinates: 50°45′10″N 1°50′29″W
- Opened: 27 October 2003
- Developer: Kier Group
- Manager: Castlepoint Management
- Owner: Standard Life Investments
- Num. of stores: 36 active
- Floors: 2
- Parking: 2 Levels with 3,000 spaces
- Website: castlepointshopping.com

Castlepoint is a retail park in Strouden Park, Bournemouth, Dorset, in the United Kingdom, occupying a 41-acre (17 ha) site containing around 40 shops, including major retailers such as Marks & Spencer, New Look, H&M, Asda, Sainsbury's, and B&Q. It is situated 3 miles (4.8 km) north-east from the centre of town, off Castle Lane West on the former site of The Hampshire Centre.

== History ==
The centre opened to the public on 27 October 2003, following a major redevelopment of the site, which had previously been occupied by The Hampshire Centre for around 35 years. Construction of the centre, undertaken by Kier Group, took over two years and cost some £275 million. The annual Pancake Race takes place to raise money for good causes each year.

On 31 August 2022, it was reported by the Bournemouth Daily Echo that 50% of the shopping centre had been sold by shareholders.

The Hampshire Centre, (19 October 2001)

== Car park problems ==
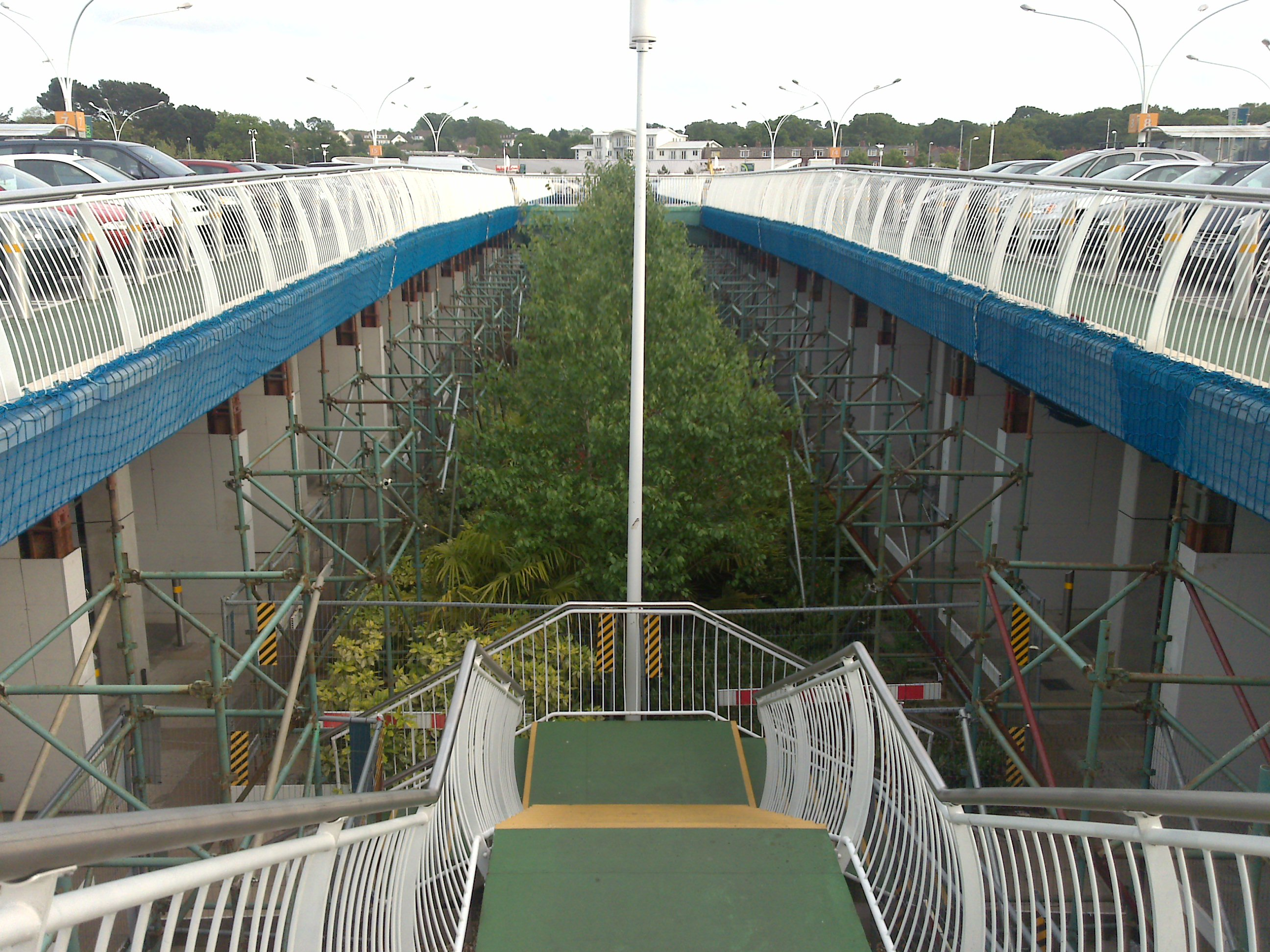
Netting and props underneath the car park are still in place (May 2011)

Shortly after the centre opened, concerns about the condition of the car park came to public attention when B&Q was forced to temporarily cease trading while the safety of the car park was determined. In May 2005 temporary safety netting was erected in the lower deck area of the east car park and around 1,000 parking spaces were closed to the public after concrete fell from the roof. By 26 May 2005, these parking spaces had re-opened, although the netting remained in place.

On 1 December 2005, the car park was again closed to the public following further safety concerns. This led to the temporary closure of all stores within the main site. The stores within the East and West Village were unaffected by this closure and remained open, although parking for these stores was limited. Whilst the centre was closed a free park and ride scheme was introduced to take shoppers to alternative shops within Bournemouth town centre. Following repair work, the car parking spaces and stores in the main centre were re-opened to the public in a phased manner between 20 December 2005 and 13 February 2006.

Although the car park was made safe with the insertion of props and the stores in the centre re-opened (and remain so), the longer-term solution for rebuilding the carpark is still to be resolved. In December 2014 the centre was given permission by the local council to rebuild the car parks in a phased manner over the next three years, due to be completed by Christmas 2018. The work was to be completed in 5 separate blocks to minimise disruption to shoppers and tenants.

In 2020, despite the COVID-19 pandemic in the United Kingdom, the car park was still in the process of being rebuilt. The new car park was completed in June 2023 and fully reopened.

== Retailers ==
Castlepoint has 40 stores and restaurants built over 645,000 square feet (59,900 m^{2}) of retail space. Since opening in 2003, several stores have ceased trading at the centre such as Principles, Virgin Megastore, Suits Direct, All Sports, Barratts, Choices Video, GAP, Hargreaves, Robert Dyas, Carphone Warehouse, The Link and Lunn Poly (later Thomson). After the sale of Virgin Megastores in the United Kingdom, the stores were re-branded as Zavvi and after going into administration in 2009, had some of their sites sold to HMV, which operated the site at Castlepoint until 2013, following the closure of some HMV UK stores. The former HMV unit is now Superdrug.

Castlepoint has a wide range of retailers including Sainsburys, TKMaxx, ProCook, Rituals, Next, CeX, H&M, ASDA, B&Q, Clarks, Waterstones, Superdrug, Marks and Spencer, River Island, Mountain Warehouse, JD Sports, New Look, Boots, The Entertainer, Mango and Easy Bathrooms.

There are also a handful of restaurants and places to eat at the site too. These include Caffe Nero, Costa Coffee, McDonald's, Starbucks, Five Guys, KFC, Nando's and M&S Café.

Five shops at the site at the site are currently empty as of August 2026. These shops are Foot Locker, Monsoon Accessorize, TGJones, Topshop and Barclays.

Mountain Warehouse moved to a larger unit December 2022. In 2023, Nike applied to open a store in the former Gap unit. In March 2023, Holland & Barrett opened in the old Mountain Warehouse.

In September 2023, Barclays and NatWest closed at the shopping centre. In June 2024, the former NatWest was replaced by a branch of TUI Travel. The Barclays unit still sits empty as of February 2026.

On 1 November 2023, Hotel Chocolat opened their first Dorset shop in the former unit used by Explore Learning. On 23 November 2023, Nike opened their first Dorset shop.

On 11 August 2024, Clintons closed down, and Waterstones moved into the unit that used to occupy it. Robert Dyas closed in the summer.

In late 2024, Rituals, a Dutch cosmetics outlet, moved into the old Robert Dyas store. The store was divided to occupy a branch of ProCook.

In May 2026, Woods Furniture moved into the store previously occupied by Lakeland in the West Village.

== Awards ==
- 2005 Purple Apple Marketing Award for its Think Big! campaign.
- 2007 Safer Business Award.

== Gallery ==
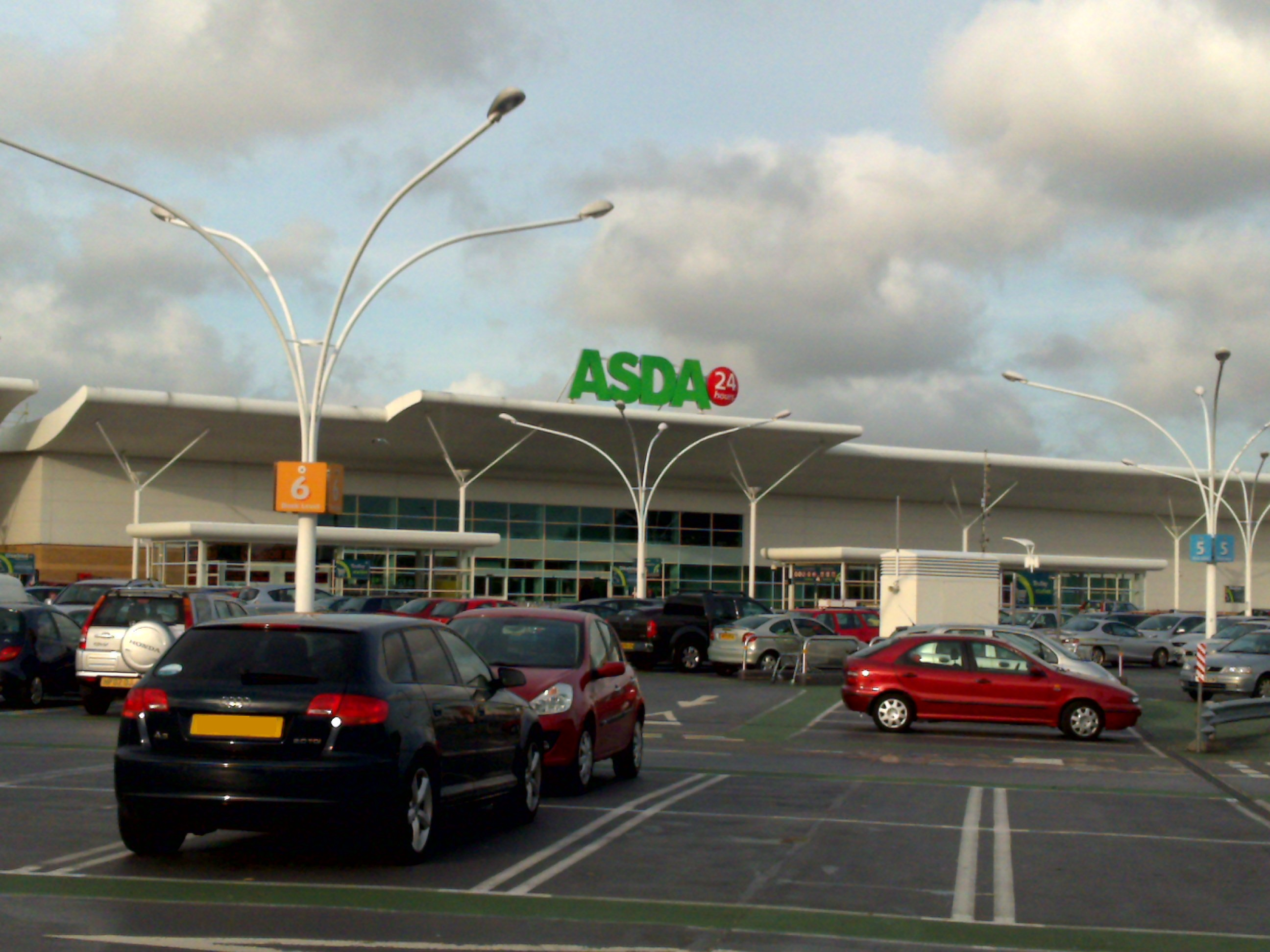
Asda

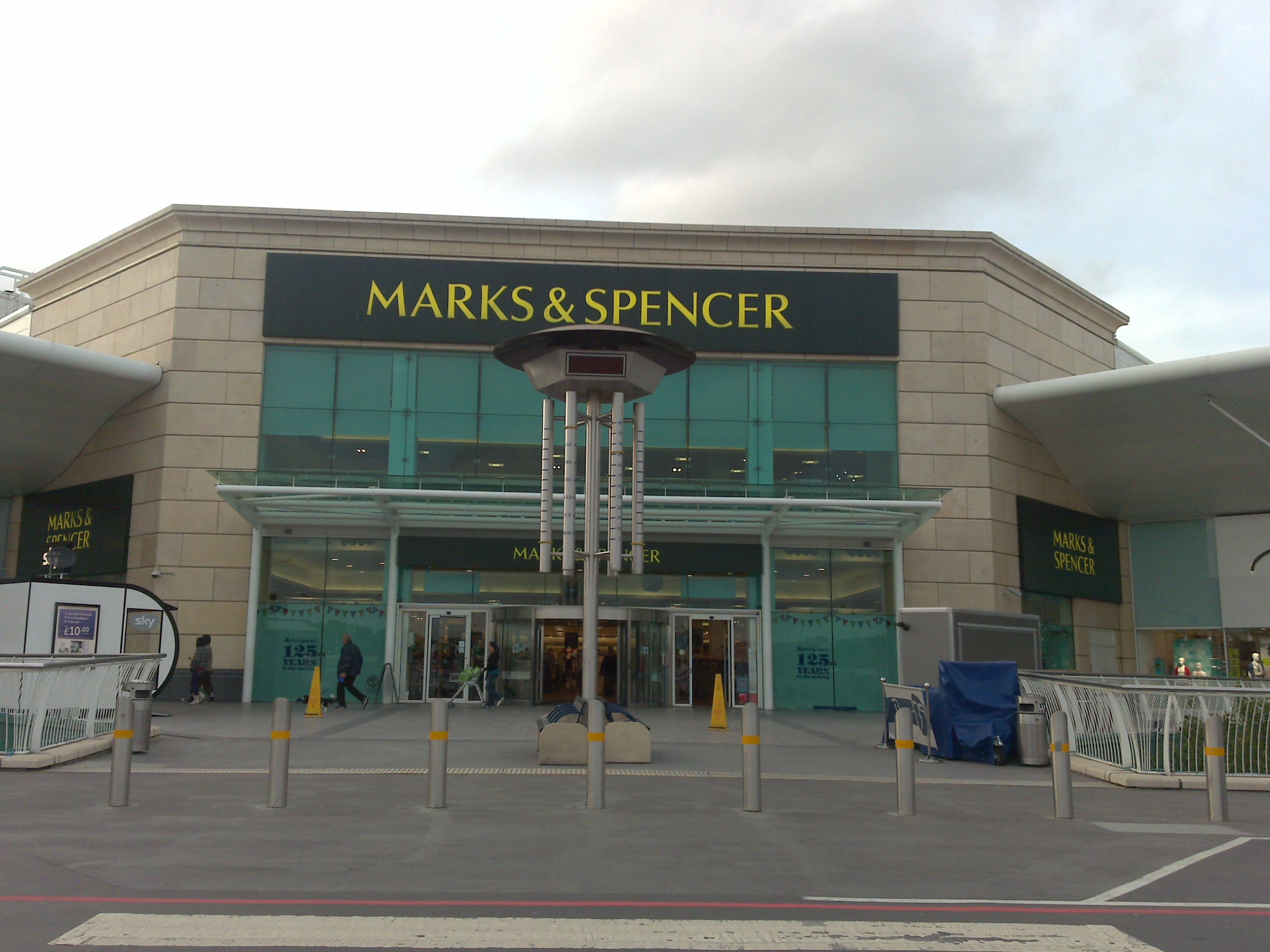
Marks & Spencer

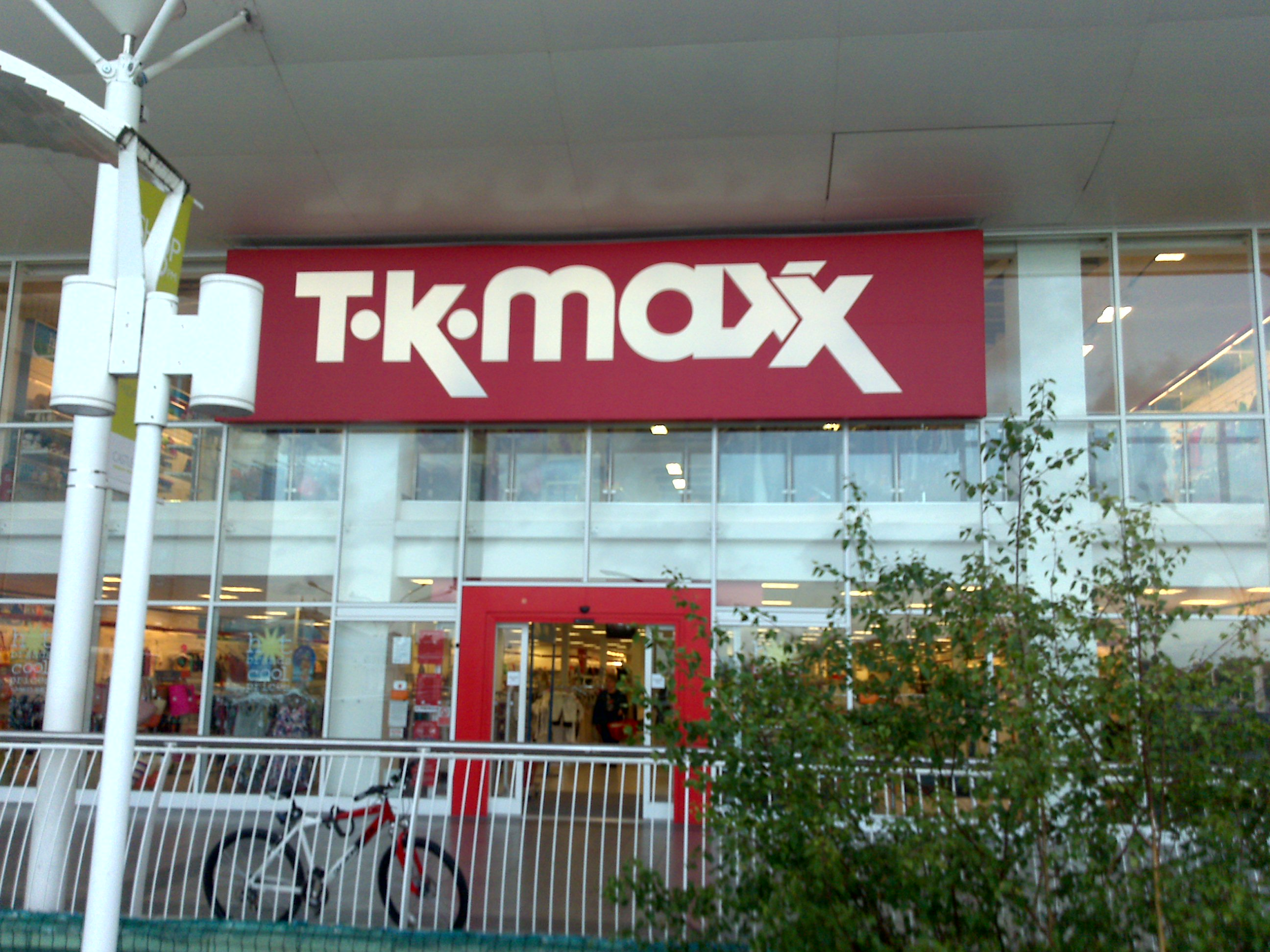
TK Maxx

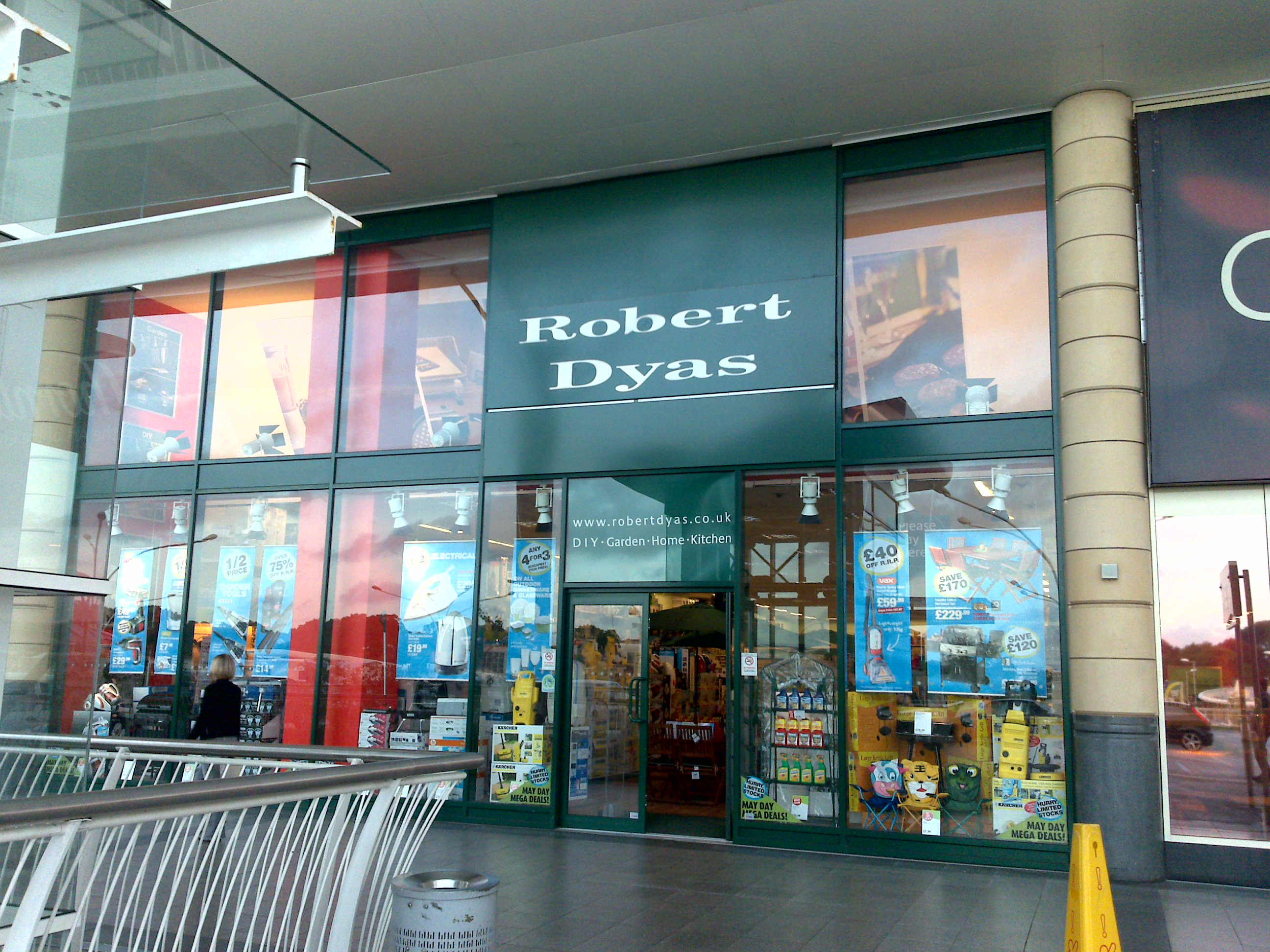
Robert Dyas

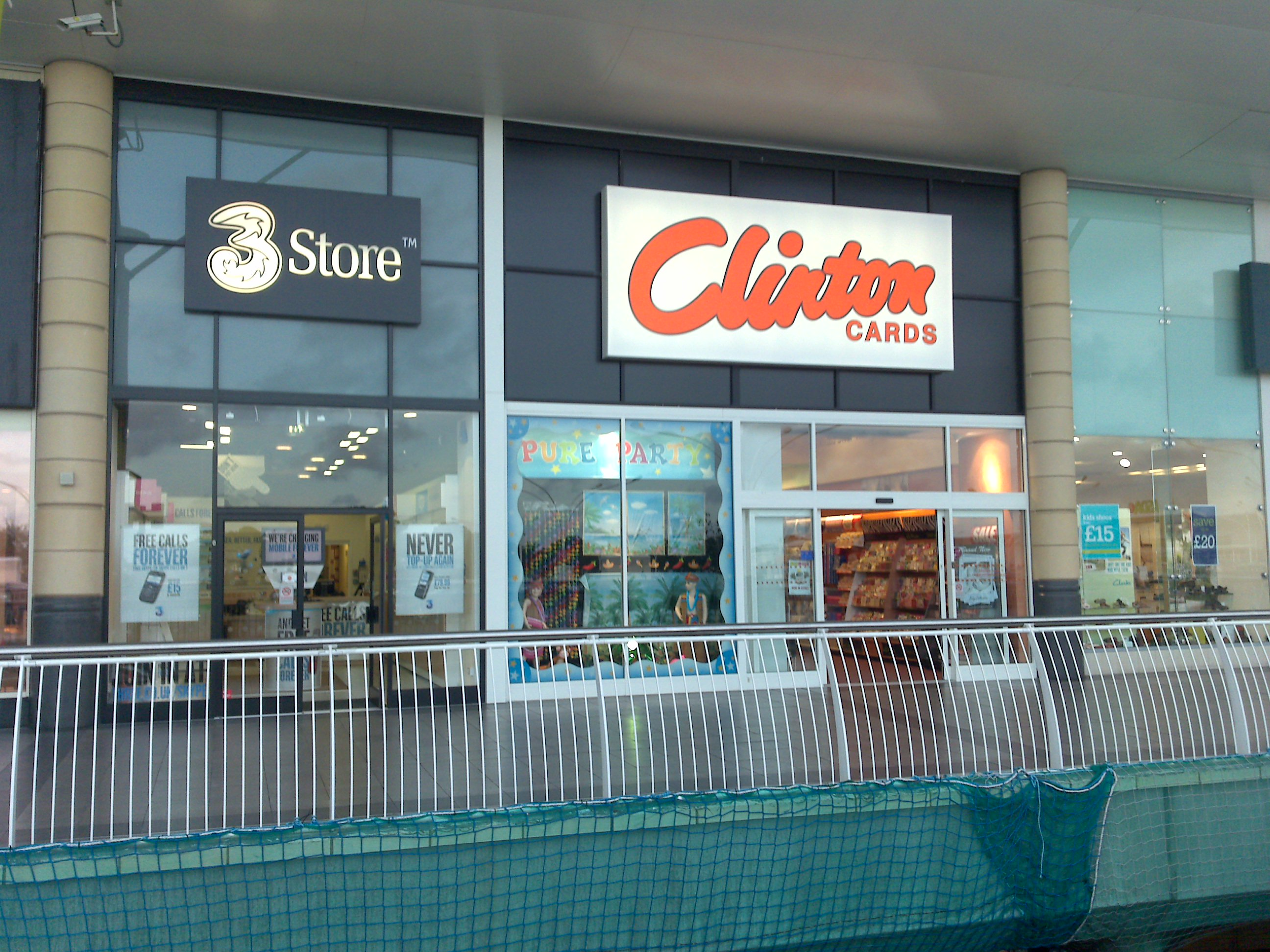
3 Store and Clinton Cards

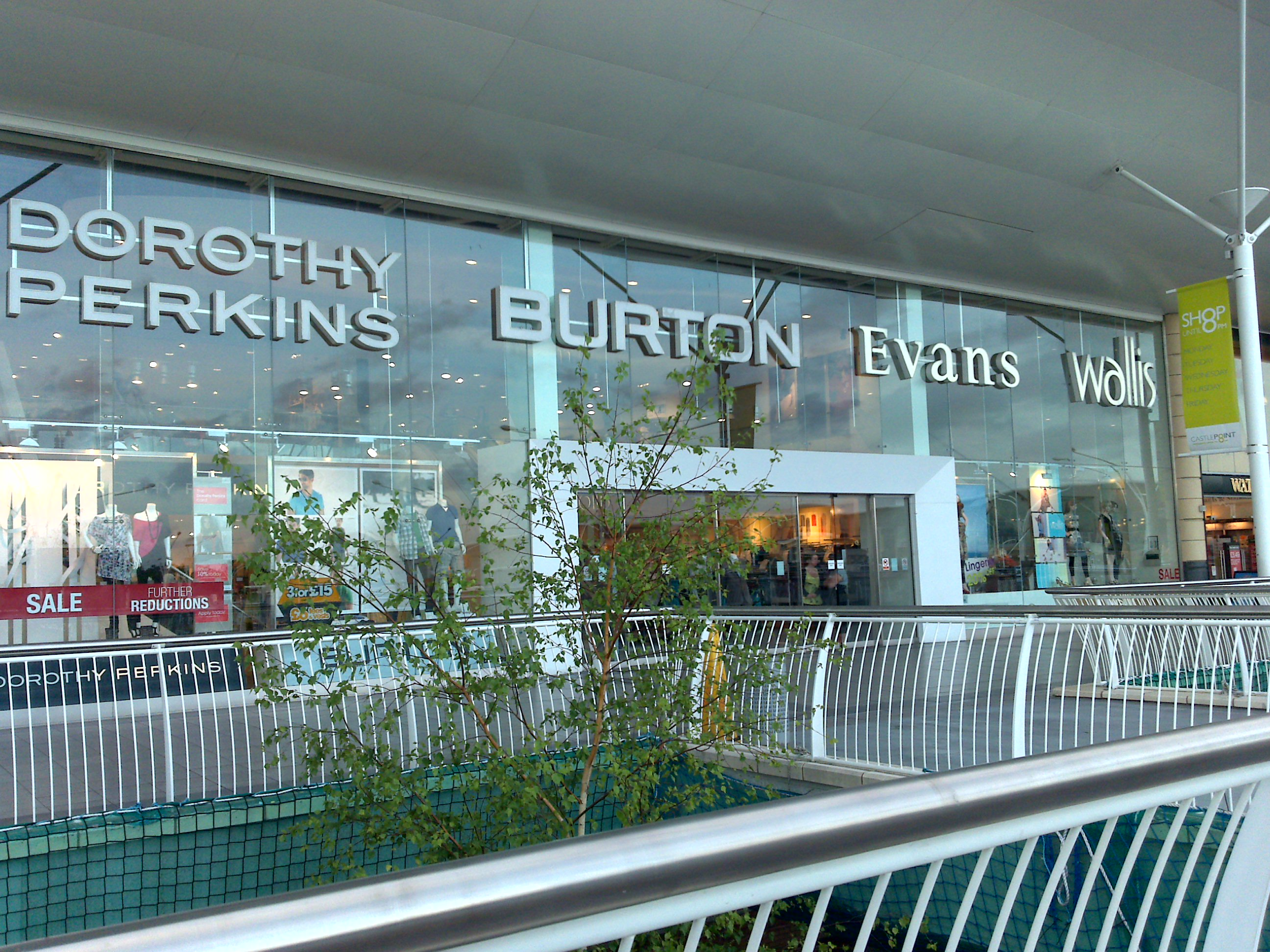
Dorothy Perkins, Burton, Evans and Wallis

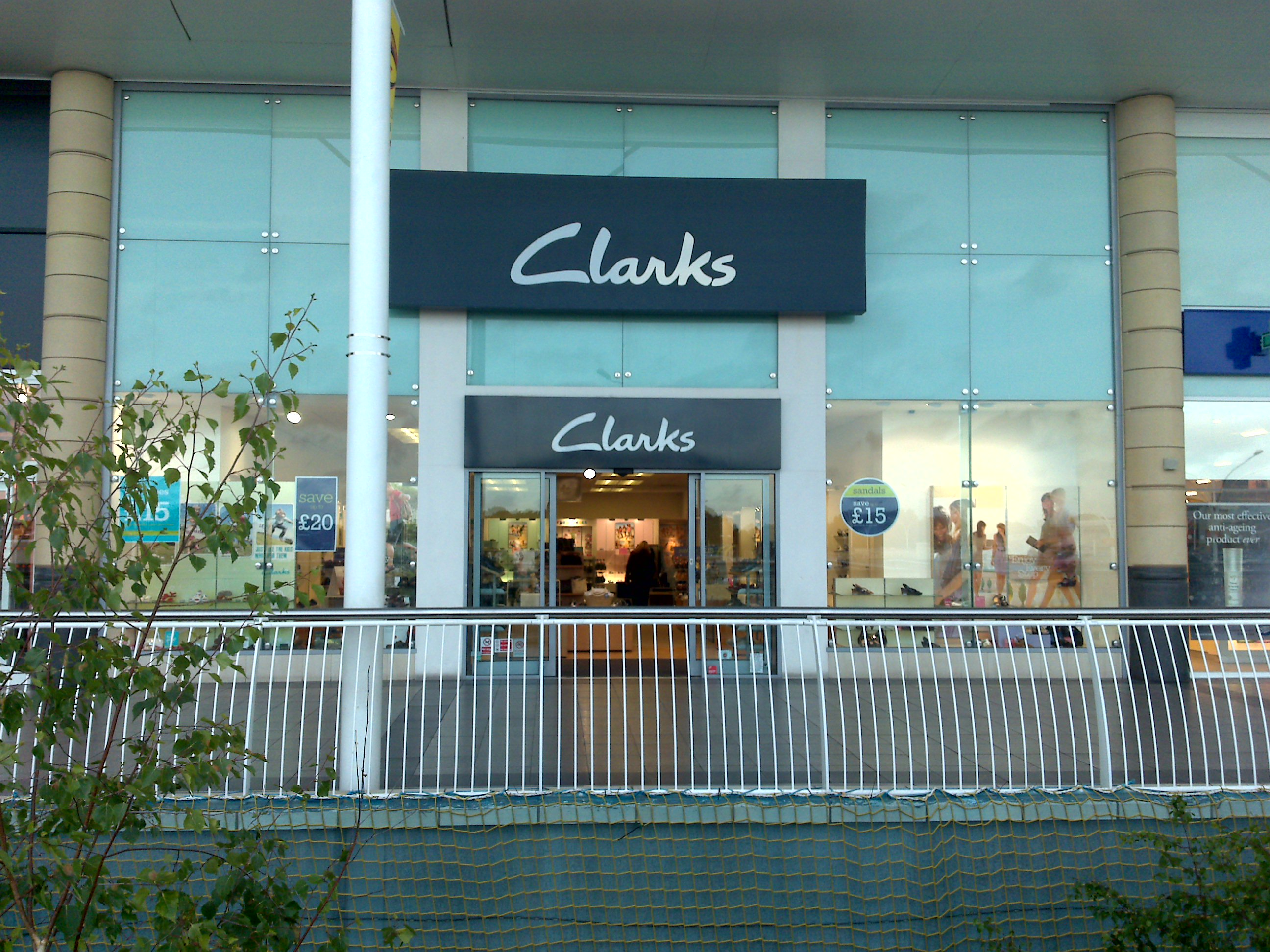
Clarks

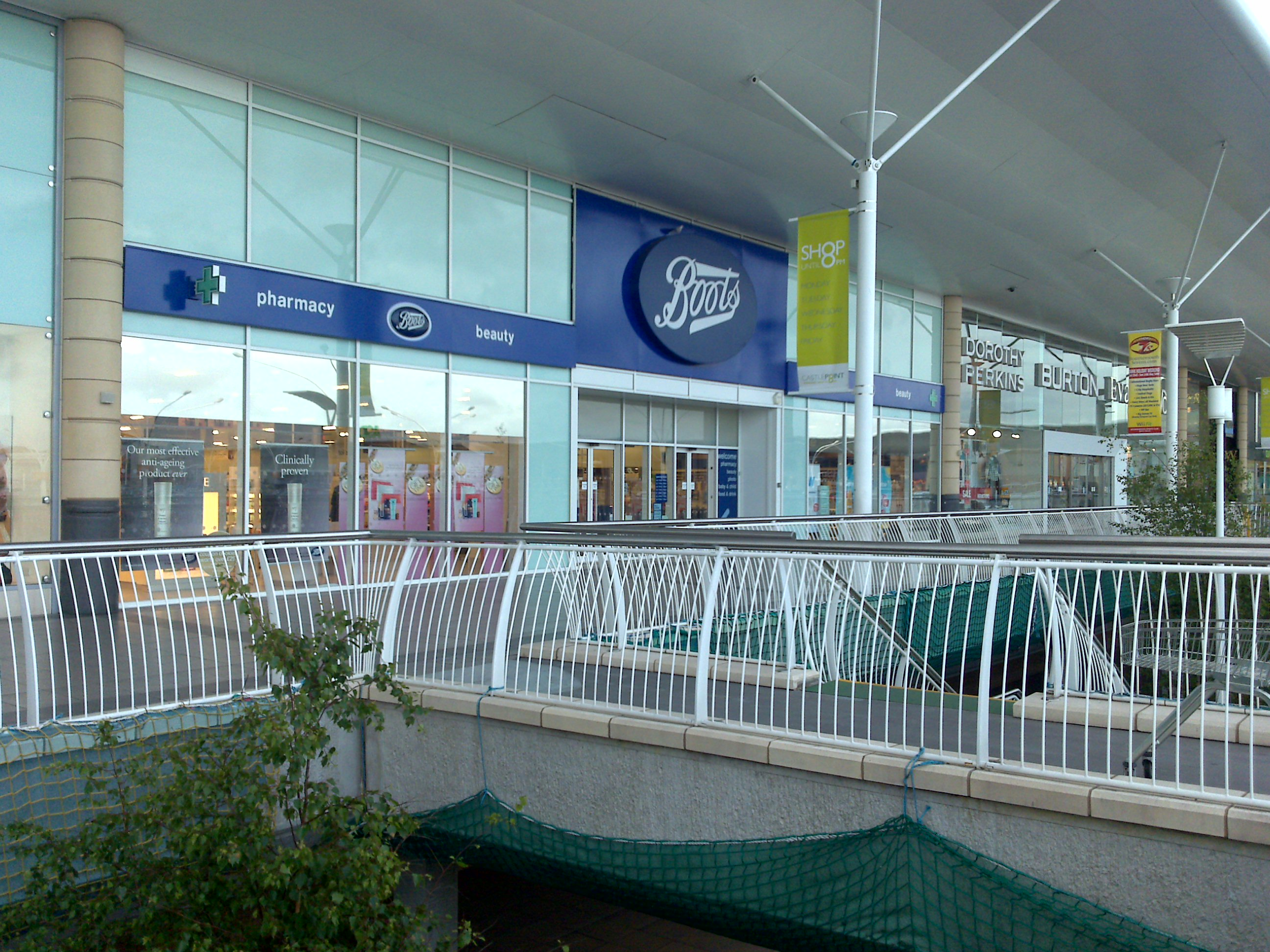
Boots

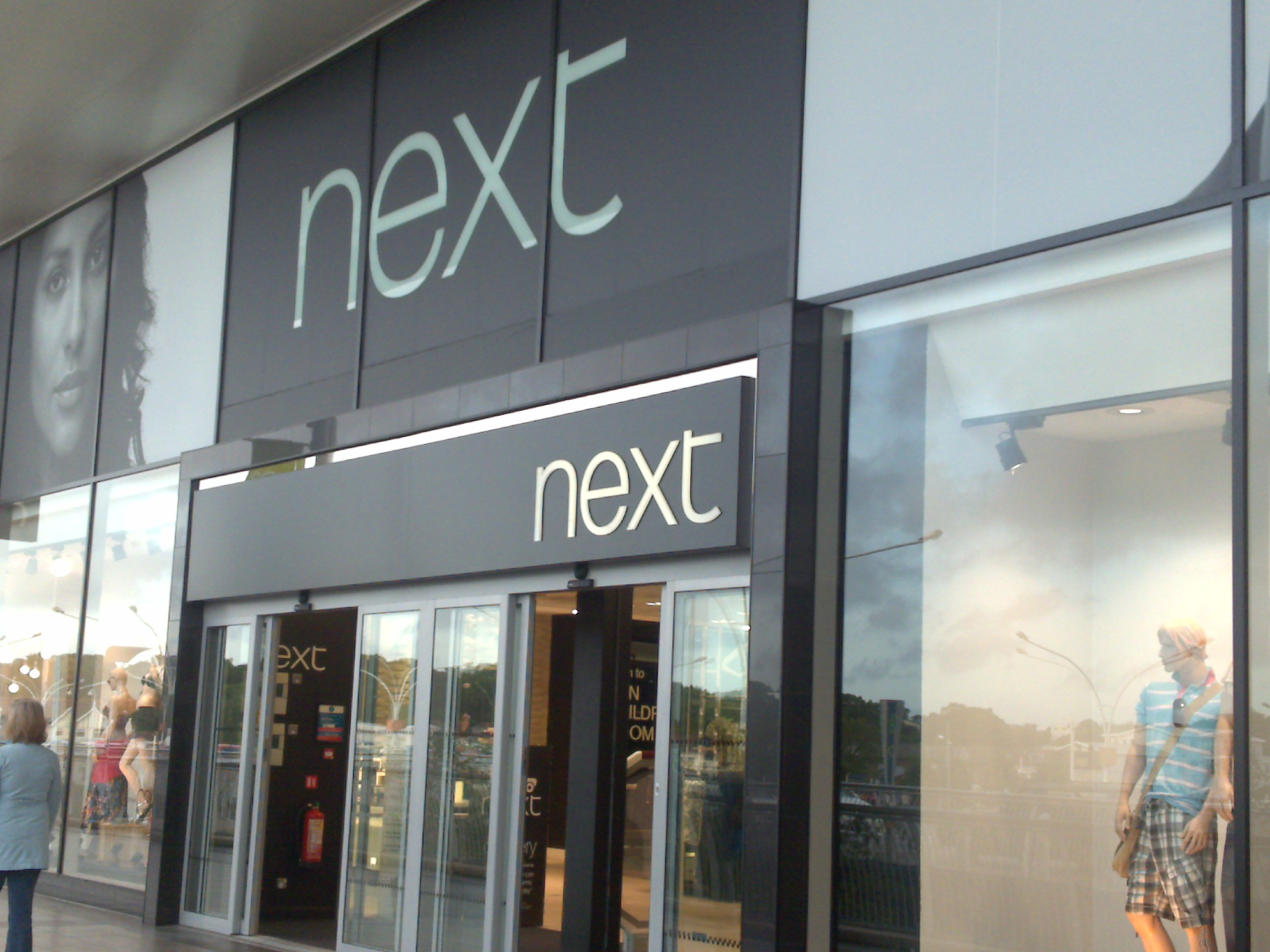
Next

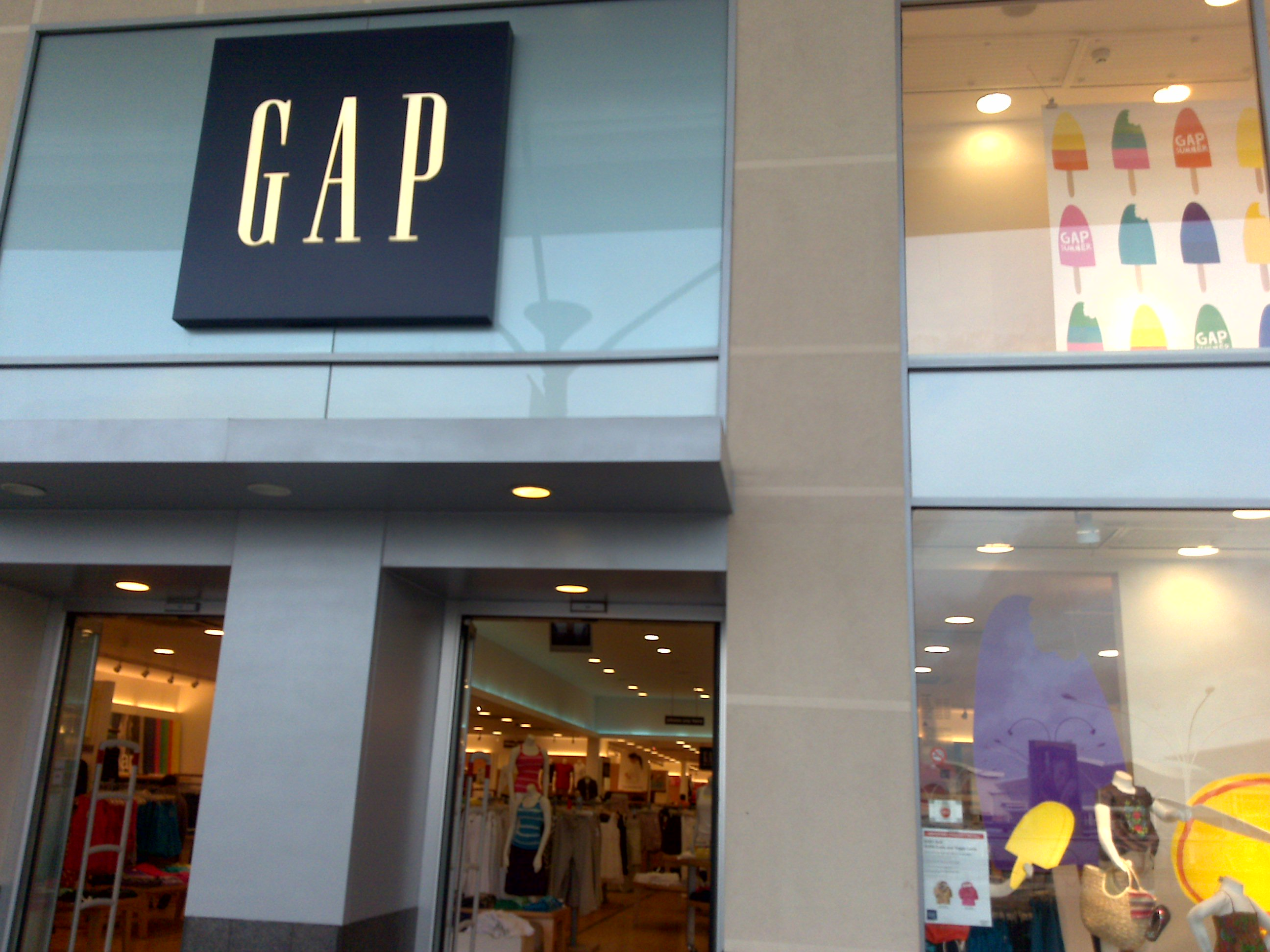
Gap

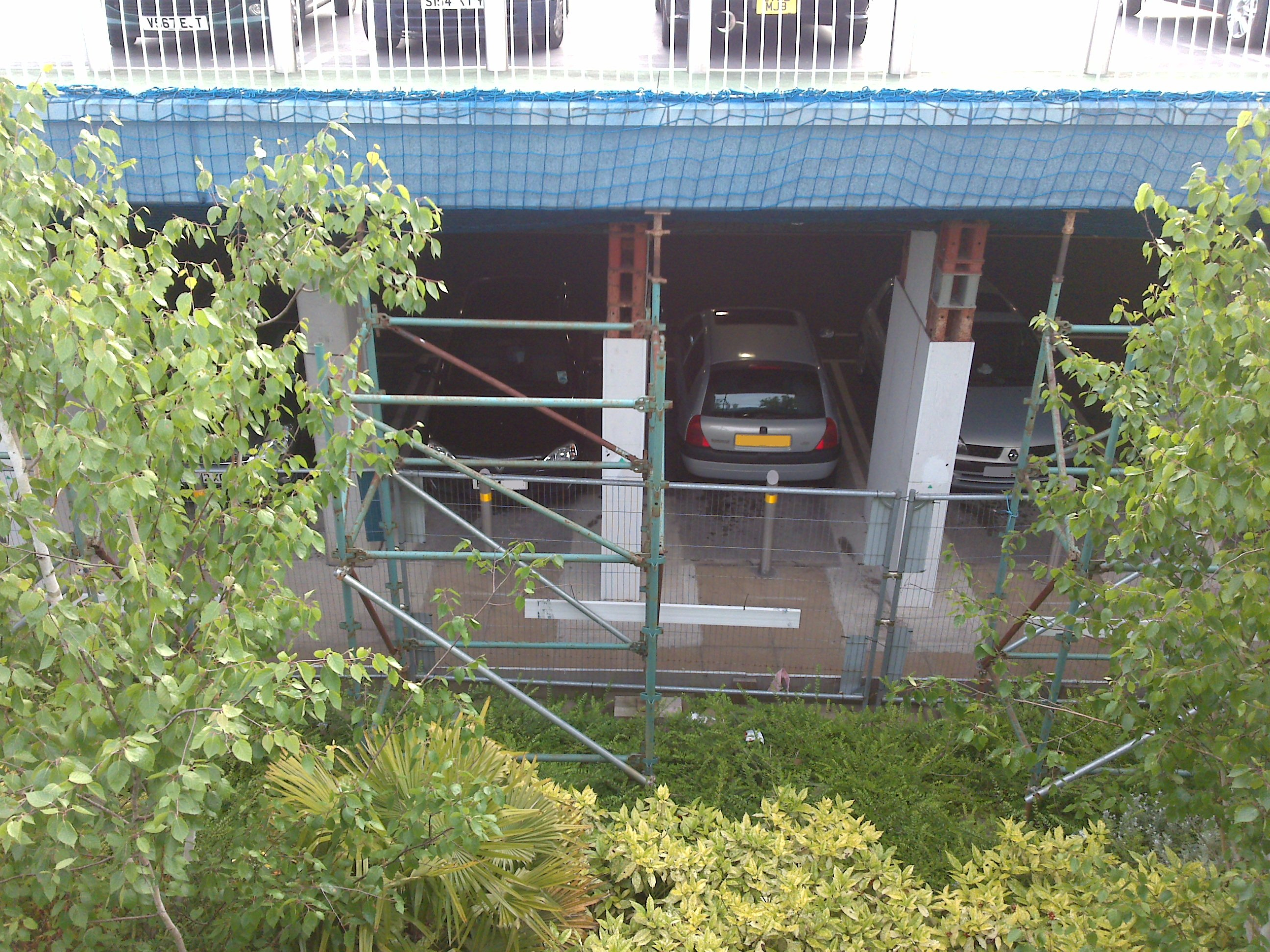
Props still in place under the car park (May 2009)
