= Littledown and Iford =

Electoral ward in Bournemouth, Dorset

Boundary of Littledown and Iford in Bournemouth, Christchurch and Poole.

Littledown and Iford is a ward in Bournemouth, Dorset. Since 2019, the ward has elected 2 councillors to Bournemouth, Christchurch and Poole Council.

== History ==
The ward formerly elected councillors to Bournemouth Borough Council before it was abolished in 2019.

== Geography ==
The ward covers the suburbs of Littledown and Iford. The ward is home to the Royal Bournemouth Hospital and Kings Park.

== Election results ==
=== 2023 ===
Littledown and Iford
| Party | Candidate | Votes | % | ±% |
|---|---|---|---|---|
| Conservative | Lawrence Williams‡ | 940 | 39.3 | −8.7 |
| Conservative | Bobbie Dove‡ | 892 | 37.3 | −9.7 |
| Liberal Democrats | Catherine Alison Bishop | 802 | 33.6 | +11.0 |
| Liberal Democrats | Chris Mayne | 572 | 23.9 | +11.2 |
| Labour | Toni Elizabeth Colledge | 470 | 19.7 | +4.6 |
| Labour | Patrick Francis Connolly | 448 | 18.8 | +5.5 |
| Green | David John Thornton Ball | 428 | 17.9 | −4.5 |
| Majority | | | | |
| Turnout | | 2,389 | 31.75 | |
| Conservative hold | | Swing | | |
| Conservative hold | | Swing | | |

=== 2019 ===
Littledown and Iford (2 seats)
| Party | Candidate | Votes | % | ±% |
|---|---|---|---|---|
| Conservative | Lawrence Williams | 1,182 | 48.0 | |
| Conservative | Bobbie Dove | 1,156 | 47.0 | |
| Liberal Democrats | Catherine Bishop | 556 | 22.6 | |
| Green | David Ball | 552 | 22.4 | |
| Labour | Pauline Haynes | 372 | 15.1 | |
| Labour | Bill Brandwood | 326 | 13.3 | |
| Liberal Democrats | Muiruri Coyne | 312 | 12.7 | |
| Majority | | | | |
| Turnout | | 2,460 | 32.62 | |
| Conservative win (new seat) | | | | |
| Conservative win (new seat) | | | | |

=== 2012 ===
A by-election was held in 2012.
