= Muscliff =

Suburb of Bournemouth, England

Coordinates: 50°45′33″N 1°51′39″W

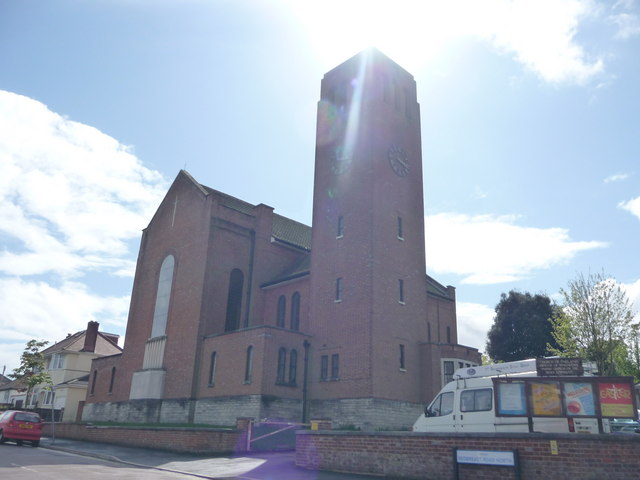
- Parish Church of the Holy Epiphany, Muscliff

- Location within Dorset
- Civil parish: Bournemouth
- Unitary authority: Bournemouth, Christchurch and Poole
- Ceremonial county: Dorset
- Region: South West
- Country: England
- Sovereign state: United Kingdom
- Post town: BOURNEMOUTH
- Postcode district: BH
- Police: Dorset
- Fire: Dorset and Wiltshire
- Ambulance: South Western
- UK Parliament: Bournemouth East

Muscliff is a suburb of Bournemouth, in the Bournemouth, Christchurch and Poole district, in the ceremonial county of Dorset, England. It is located near Redhill, Strouden Park and Moordown.

== Education ==
- Muscliff Primary School

== Religion ==
- Holy Epiphany Church, Muscliff

== Politics ==
Muscliff is part of the Muscliff and Strouden Park ward for elections to Bournemouth, Christchurch and Poole Council which elect three councillors.

Muscliff is part of the Bournemouth East parliamentary constituency, for elections to the House of Commons of the United Kingdom.
