= Townsend, Bournemouth =

Suburb of Bournemouth, Dorset, England

Coordinates: 50.751389°N 1.830556°W

Townsend: Muscliff and Strouden Park
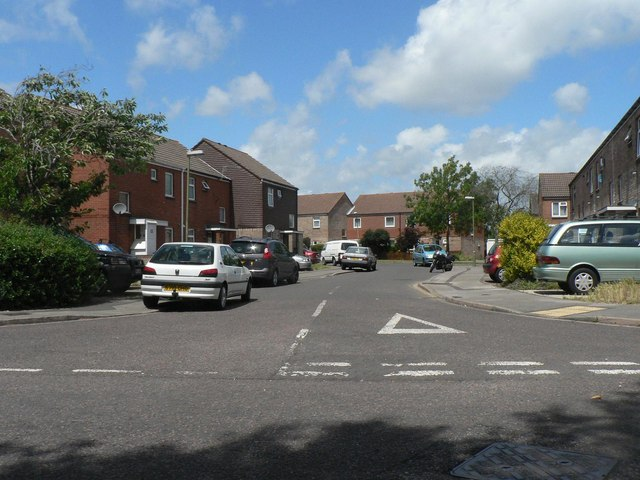
- Housing in Townsend

- Location within Dorset
- OS grid reference: SZ128952
- Unitary authority: Bournemouth, Christchurch and Poole
- Ceremonial county: Dorset
- Region: South West
- Country: England
- Sovereign state: United Kingdom
- Post town: BOURNEMOUTH
- Postcode district: BH8
- Dialling code: 01202
- Police: Dorset
- Fire: Dorset and Wiltshire
- Ambulance: South Western
- UK Parliament: Bournemouth East

Townsend is an area of Bournemouth, Dorset. It is located in the suburbs along the north eastern boundary of the town and is close to the Royal Bournemouth Hospital.

== History ==
Townsend is a housing estate and was built in the mid-1970s.

== Politics ==
Townsend is part of the Muscliff and Strouden Park ward for elections to Bournemouth, Christchurch and Poole Council which elect three councillors.

Townsend is part of the Bournemouth East parliamentary constituency, for elections to the House of Commons of the United Kingdom.
