= Christchurch Town (ward) =

Ward in Christchurch, England

- ward Bournemouth, Christchurch and Poole Council
- Boundary of Christchurch Town in Bournemouth, Christchurch and Poole.
- Major settlements: Christchurch

Current ward
- Created: 2019
- Councillor: Mike Cox (Liberal Democrats)
- Councillor: Michael Tarling (Liberal Democrats)
- Created from: Town Centre; Portfield; Purewell and Stanpit (Part)
- UK Parliament constituency: Christchurch

Christchurch Town is a ward in Christchurch, Dorset. Since the 2019 election, the ward has elected 2 councillors to Bournemouth, Christchurch and Poole Council. Before then, the Town Centre ward elected two councillors to Christchurch Borough Council.

== History ==
The Town Centre ward elected Conservative Councillors at the 2015 Christchurch Borough Council election.

In the first election to 2019 Bournemouth, Christchurch and Poole Council in 2019, Christchurch Town was the only ward in Christchurch to elect a Liberal Democrat councillor.

== Geography ==
The ward is based around Christchurch Town Centre as well as Purewell and parts of Portfield. It consists mainly of the former Christchurch Borough ward of Town Centre, as well as parts of the former wards of Portfield (the remainder now part Commons) and Purewell and Stanpit (now part of Mudeford, Stanpit and West Highcliffe).

== Councillors ==
The ward is represented by two councillors:

Election	Councillors	
2003	Town Centre - Christchurch Borough	
2003	Chris Legg (Liberal Democrats)	Peter Hall (Liberal Democrats)
2007	Brett Bader (Liberal Democrats)	Peter Hall (Liberal Democrats)
2011	Gillian Geary (Conservative)	Peter Hall (Liberal Democrats)
2015	Wendy Grace (Conservative)	Peter Hall (Conservative)
2019	Bournemouth, Christchurch and Poole	
2019	Mike Cox (Liberal Democrats)	Peter Hall (Conservative)
2023	Mike Cox (Liberal Democrats)	Michael Tarling (Liberal Democrats)

== Election results ==
=== 2023 ===
Christchurch Town
Party	Candidate	Votes	%	±%
Liberal Democrats	Mike Cox‡	1,619	53.8	+24.2
Liberal Democrats	Michael John Tarling	1,456	48.4	+20.2
CI	Avril Elizabeth Coulton	778	25.8	+3.6
CI	Viv Charrett	695	23.1	+2.4
Conservative	John Trickett	372	12.4	−15.8
Conservative	Luc Wesley Swarbrick	362	12.0	−11.8
Labour	Julian Spurr	208	6.9	−4.6
Green	Sam Cato	183	6.1	−6.7
Green	Steven Miles Thomas	117	3.9	N/A
Majority				
Turnout		3,010	37.24	
Liberal Democrats hold		Swing		
Liberal Democrats gain from Conservative		Swing		

=== 2019 ===
Christchurch Town (2 seats)
Party	Candidate	Votes	%	±%
Liberal Democrats	Mike Cox	891	29.6	
Conservative	Peter Hall	851	28.2	
Liberal Democrats	Michael Tarling	850	28.2	
Conservative	Peter Watson-Lee	716	23.8	
Independent	Fred Neale	668	22.2	
Independent	Lindy Stuart-Clark	625	20.7	
Green	Steve Docherty	386	12.8	
Labour	Robert Hope	348	11.5	
Labour	David Munnik	279	9.3	
Majority				
Turnout		3,014	38.20%	
Liberal Democrats win (new seat)				
Conservative win (new seat)				

=== 2015 ===
Town Centre (2 seats)
Party	Candidate	Votes	%	±%
Conservative	Peter Hall	1,045		
Conservative	Wendy Grace	993		
UKIP	Liz Faherty	585		
UKIP	Olga Turner	476		
Labour	George Gregory	365		
Green	Joanne Dyton	349		
Green	Steven Thomas	289		
Turnout		4,102	70.2	+21.0
Conservative hold		Swing		
Conservative hold		Swing		
