= Burton and Grange =

Electoral ward in Dorset, England

- ward Bournemouth, Christchurch and Poole Council
- Boundary of Burton and Grange in Bournemouth, Christchurch and Poole.
- Major settlements: Burton, Dorset

Current ward
- Created: 2019
- Councillor: David Flagg (Independent)
- Councillor: Simon McCormack (Independent)
- Created from: Burton and Winkton; Grange

2003–2019
- Number of councillors: 2

2003–2019
- Number of councillors: 2
- UK Parliament constituency: Christchurch

Burton and Grange is a ward of Christchurch, Dorset. Since 2019, the ward has elected 2 councillors to Bournemouth, Christchurch and Poole Council.

== Geography ==
The ward includes the villages/suburbs of Burton and Winkton. The ward comprises the entirety of the former Christchurch Borough Council wards of Burton & Winkton and Grange, which each elected two councillors each.

== Councillors ==
=== Burton and Grange ===
The ward is currently represented by two independent councillors.

| Election | Councillors | |
|---|---|---|
| 2019 | David Flagg (Independent) | Simon McCormack (Independent) |
| 2023 | David Flagg (Independent) | Simon McCormack (Independent) |

=== Former Wards ===
==== Burton & Winkton ====
| Election | Councillors | |
|---|---|---|
| 2003 | David Flagg (Conservative) | Colin Jamieson (Conservative) |
| 2007 | David Flagg (Conservative) | Colin Jamieson (Conservative) |
| 2011 | David Flagg (Conservative) | Colin Jamieson (Conservative) |
| 2015 | David Flagg (Conservative) | Colin Jamieson (Conservative) |

==== Grange ====
| Election | Councillors | |
|---|---|---|
| 2003 | John Campbell (Liberal Democrat) | John Freeman (Liberal Democrat) |
| 2007 | Julie Petrie (Independent) | Denise Jones (Conservative) |
| 2011 | Paul Hilliard (Conservative) | Denise Jones (Conservative) |
| 2015 | Janet Abbott (UKIP) | Denise Jones (Conservative) |

== Election results ==
=== 2023 ===
Burton and Grange
| Party | Candidate | Votes | % | ±% |
|---|---|---|---|---|
| CI | Simon Jonathan McCormack‡ | 727 | 40.6 | −4.5 |
| CI | David Anthony Flagg‡ | 652 | 36.4 | −14.8 |
| Conservative | Michael Adams | 445 | 24.8 | +9.3 |
| Conservative | Samuel Nicholas Joynson | 385 | 21.5 | +6.2 |
| Liberal Democrats | Robert Franklin Dawson | 365 | 20.4 | +14.1 |
| Liberal Democrats | Alinda Jane Howland | 304 | 17.0 | +11.6 |
| Labour | Simon Peter Charles Dawson | 228 | 12.7 | −9.8 |
| Green | Graham Paul Kendrick | 155 | 8.7 | +0.7 |
| Green | Deb Sutton | 134 | 7.5 | N/A |
| Majority | | | | |
| Turnout | | 1,791 | 25.42 | |
| CI hold | | Swing | | |
| CI hold | | Swing | | |

=== 2019 ===
2019 Bournemouth, Christchurch and Poole Council election: Burton and Grange (2 seats)
| Party | Candidate | Votes | % | ±% |
|---|---|---|---|---|
| Independent | David Flagg* | 1,196 | 51.2 | |
| Independent | Simon McCormack | 1,053 | 45.1 | |
| Labour | Claire Wade | 525 | 22.5 | |
| Labour | Andrew Dunne | 420 | 18.0 | |
| Conservative | Wendy Grace | 363 | 15.5 | |
| Conservative | Brian Case | 358 | 15.3 | |
| Green | Benjamin Pantling | 187 | 8.0 | |
| Liberal Democrats | Robert Dawson | 146 | 6.3 | |
| Liberal Democrats | Frederick Worthy | 125 | 5.4 | |
| Majority | | | | |
| Turnout | | 2,336 | 33.46% | |
| Independent win (new seat) | | | | |
| Independent win (new seat) | | | | |
