= Christchurch Borough Council elections =

Local government elections in Dorset, England

Map showing the composition of Christchurch Borough Council after the 2015 election. Conservatives in blue, independents in grey, UK Independence Party in purple.

Christchurch Borough Council in Dorset, England, existed from 1974 to 2019, when it was abolished and subsumed into Bournemouth, Christchurch and Poole Council.

== Political control ==
The first elections to the council were held in 1973, initially operating as a shadow authority prior to the district coming into effect the following year. From 1973 until its abolition in 2019 political control of the council was held by the following parties:

Party in control	Years
Conservative	1973–1995
No overall control	1995–1999
Conservative	1999–2019

=== Leadership ===
The role of mayor was largely ceremonial at Christchurch Borough Council. Political leadership was instead provided by the leader of the council. The leaders from 2003 until the council's abolition in 2019 were:

Councillor	Party	From	To
Harold Cooper	Conservative		14 Feb 2003
Alan Griffiths	Conservative	2003	2010
John Lofts	Conservative	Dec 2010	May 2011
Ray Nottage	Conservative	17 May 2011	20 Feb 2017
David Flagg	Conservative	20 Feb 2017	31 Mar 2019

== Council elections ==
Summary of the council composition after each election; click on the year for full details of each election. Boundary changes took place for the 2003 election, reducing the number of seats by one.

- 1973 Christchurch Borough Council election
- 1976 Christchurch Borough Council election
- 1979 Christchurch Borough Council election (New ward boundaries)
- 1983 Christchurch Borough Council election
- 1987 Christchurch Borough Council election
- 1991 Christchurch Borough Council election

Year	Conservative	Independent	UK Independence Party	Liberal Democrats	Notes
1995	8	7	0	10	Borough boundary changes took place but the number of seats remained the same
1999	17	3	0	5	
2003	14	2	0	8	New ward boundaries
2007	17	3	0	4	
2011	21	2	0	1	
2015	21	2	1	0	

== Borough result maps ==
2003 results map

2007 results map

2011 results map

2015 results map

== By-election results ==
By-elections occur when seats become vacant between council elections. Below is a summary of recent by-elections; full by-election results can be found by clicking on the by-election name.

By-election	Date	Incumbent party	Winning party
Burton	1 May 1997	Liberal Democrats	Liberal Democrats
Jumpers by-election	7 June 2001	Liberal Democrats	Liberal Democrats
Jumpers by-election	5 May 2005	Independent	Liberal Democrats
Portfield by-election	5 May 2005	Conservative	Liberal Democrats
Purewell and Stanpit by-election	5 May 2005	Liberal Democrats	Liberal Democrats
Portfield by-election	16 July 2009	Liberal Democrats	Liberal Democrats
Mudeford and Friars Cliff by-election	2 March 2017	Conservative	Conservative
