= Purewell =

Area of Christchurch, Dorset, England

Coordinates: 50.737°N 1.769°W

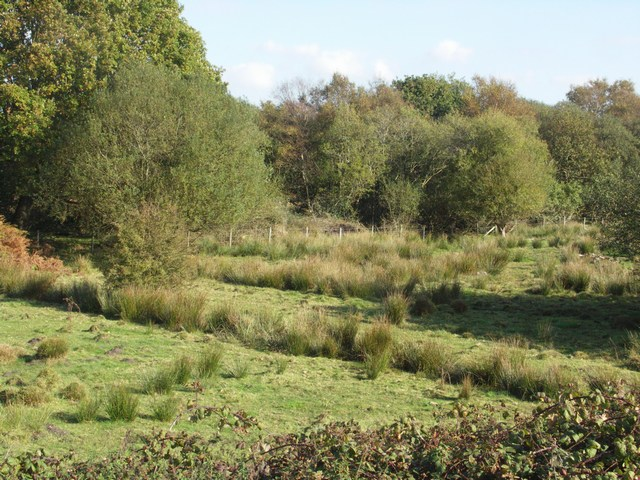
- Purewell Meadows Nature Reserve

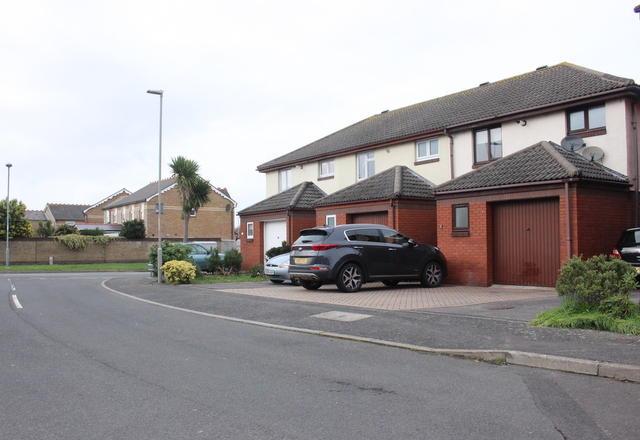
- Ladysmith Close, Purewell

- Location within Dorset
- Unitary authority: Bournemouth, Christchurch and Poole
- Ceremonial county: Dorset
- Region: South West
- Country: England
- Sovereign state: United Kingdom
- Post town: BOURNEMOUTH
- Postcode district: BH
- Police: Dorset
- Fire: Dorset and Wiltshire
- Ambulance: South Western
- UK Parliament: Christchurch

Purewell is a suburb of Christchurch, Dorset. The area is south of Burton, east of Christchurch Town Centre, west of Somerford and north of Stanpit.

== History ==
Purewell is part of the Anglican parish of Christchurch Priory. To provide a place of worship closer to the local residents, St John's Mission Church was built in 1880 at the expense of Miss Mary Long, on the site of former workhouses, and opened by the Bishop of Winchester in February 1881.

In 2020, Purewell lost its Post Office.

== Politics ==
Purewell and Stanpit elected two councillors to Christchurch Borough Council until 2019. It is now part of Bournemouth, Christchurch and Poole.

Purewell is part of the Christchurch parliamentary constituency for elections to the House of Commons. It is currently represented by Conservative MP Christopher Chope.
