= Maureen Hicks =

British politician (1948–2024)

Maureen Patricia Hicks

Member of Parliament for Wolverhampton North East
- In office 11 June 1987 – 16 March 1992
- Preceded by: Renee Short
- Succeeded by: Ken Purchase

Personal details
- Born: Maureen Patricia Cutler; 23 February 1948 Burton-on-Sea, England
- Died: 13 February 2024 (aged 75) Stratford-upon-Avon, England
- Party: Conservative
- Spouse: Keith Hicks (m. 1973)
- Children: 2

Maureen Patricia Hicks (née Cutler; 23 February 1948 – 13 February 2024) was a British politician who was the Conservative Member of Parliament (MP) for Wolverhampton North East from 1987 to 1992.

== Early life ==
Maureen Patricia Cutler was born in Burton-on-Sea, Hampshire on 23 February 1948. She was educated at Furzedown College of Education.

From 1969 to 1970, as Maureen Cutler, she was a secondary school teacher of drama and English. She was also a lecturer. From 1970 to 1974, she was an assistant staff manager at Marks and Spencer. From 1974 to 1976, she was an assistant area education officer.

Maureen Hicks was heavily involved in local tourism at Stratford-upon-Avon, whilst realising the necessity to remain sensitive to the needs of the local residents. She was a former member of the Heart of England Tourist Board executive, and director of Stratford-upon-Avon Motor Museum from 1976 to 1982. In 1978, she helped to form Stratford-upon-Avon and District Marketing, which brought together hotels, retailers and attractions with District Council support.

Hicks served as a councillor in Stratford upon Avon District Council from 1979 to 1984.

== Member of Parliament ==
In the 1987 general election, Hicks stood as the Conservative candidate for the Wolverhampton North East constituency. It had been a Labour seat for many years but had become marginal in the 1983 Conservative landslide. The constituency's previous Labour MP, Renee Short, had retired and was replaced as Labour candidate by Ken Purchase. Despite the small overall national swing to Labour, Hicks gained the seat against the tide with a swing of 0.5% to the Conservatives, winning by just 204 votes (0.4% of the total).

Once a Member of Parliament, Hicks made her maiden speech on 1 December 1987, during a House of Commons debate on an Education Reform Bill. She was a member of the Conservative backbench tourism committee until 1990, and a member of the Select Committee on Education, Science and the Arts. For the remainder of her time in the House of Commons, she was a parliamentary private secretary for the Earl of Caithness and for Mark Lennox-Boyd, Minister of State and Under Secretary of State respectively for the Foreign and Commonwealth Office.

Hicks stood for re-election in the 1992 general election in her Wolverhampton North East seat. The polls were pointing towards a national swing to the Labour Party and her chances of retaining the seat were never rated highly. She used a battle bus in her campaign to be re-elected, adopting Tina Turner’s song "Simply the Best," to be played out as the bus drove in the streets of her constituency, saying she had chosen a song by a strong woman to emphasise her own credentials as a steely female.

In the event, Hicks polled 20,167 votes, numerically more than she had achieved in 1987, and her share of the vote fell by just 0.5%. Ken Purchase, who was running again for Labour, enjoyed an increase of 7.6% in his share of the vote, mostly at the expense of the Liberal Democrats' candidate. Hicks thus lost her seat by 3,939 votes (8.1%) to Purchase on a 4.2% swing to Labour. The election declaration was broadcast on ITN's Election Special.

== After the House of Commons ==
Following Hicks's defeat, she re-located to Stratford-upon-Avon, where she was appointed by the local council to a role as town centre manager, and was involved in plans to develop the town's Bell Court Shopping Centre. She was a project director for the Stratford-upon-Avon Visitor Management Action Programme (VMAP), and was a founder member of the Shakespeare Country Association of Tourist Attractions (SCATA) - which includes the Royal Shakespeare Company, Warwick Castle, Anne Hathaway's Cottage and other Shakespeare Birthplace Trust properties.

In November 1995, the Conservative MP for Stratford-upon-Avon, Alan Howarth, announced that he was defecting to the Labour party. The local Conservative association quickly moved to select a new candidate to replace him for the 1997 general election. Hicks, as a local candidate, put her name forward and made a shortlist of six candidates, but she lost the nomination to John Maples, the former MP for Lewisham West who had also lost his seat in the 1992 general election.

Hicks held a number of directorships, including for Earl Mountbatten Hospice in Newport, Isle of Wight.

== Personal life and death ==
Hicks's interests in Who's Who included golf, music and travel.

In 1973, she married Keith Hicks. They had a son and a daughter. Maureen Hicks died in Stratford-upon-Avon on 13 February 2024, at the age of 75.

== Sources ==
- "Times Guide to the House of Commons", Times Newspapers Limited, 1992 edition.

Parliament of the United Kingdom
Preceded by Renee Short	Member of Parliament for Wolverhampton North East; 1987–1992	Succeeded by Ken Purchase
