= Winkton =

Winkton may refer to the following places in England:

- Winkton, Dorset, a hamlet in Dorset that was formerly in Hampshire
- Winkton, East Riding of Yorkshire, an abandoned hamlet in the civil parish of Barmston in the East Riding of Yorkshire
