= St John's Church, Purewell =

Church in Purewell, Dorset, England

St John's Church
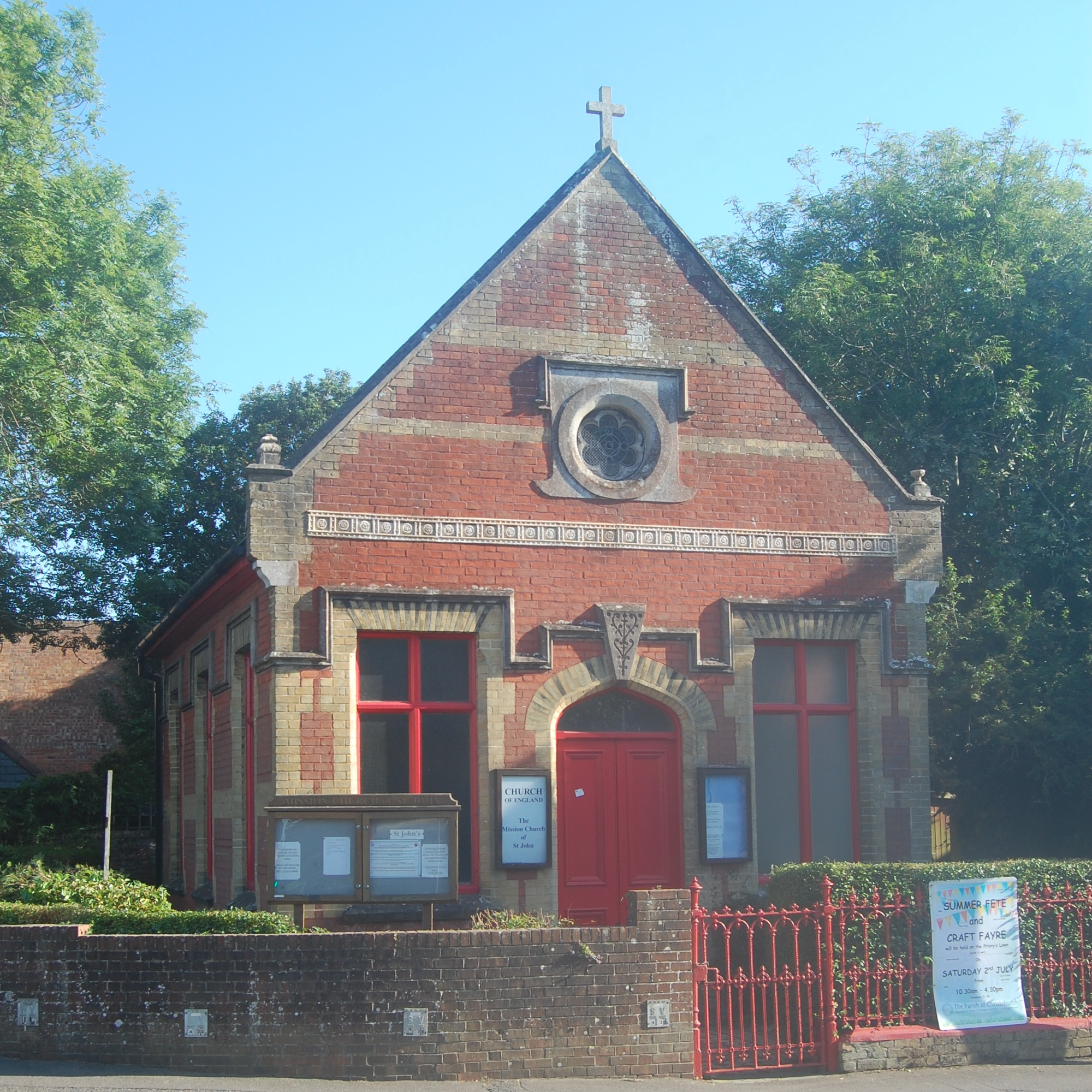
- The church from the southwest in June 2022

Religion
- Affiliation: Church of England
- Ecclesiastical or organizational status: Active

Location
- Location: Purewell, Dorset, England
- Interactive map of St John's Church
- Coordinates: 50.7358°N 1.7600°W

Architecture
- Architect: William Jurd
- Type: Church
- Style: Tudor Gothic
- Completed: 1881

St John's Church is a Church of England mission church in Purewell, Dorset, England. It was built in 1880–81.

== History ==
St John's was built to provide Purewell with a more convenient place for Divine worship as Christchurch Priory was about a mile away. A local benefactress, Miss Mary Long, had the mission church (or room) built at her sole expense on land at the corner of Purewell Cross. The site was vacant after a fire destroyed previous buildings there in 1876 and Miss Long purchased the land on 23 September 1880 for £200.

Construction of St John's commenced in September 1880, with Charles Davis of Purewell as the builder. It was designed by William Jurd of Southampton, with accommodation for approximately 100 people. The building was built in memory of Miss Long's brothers, James Long of Southampton and Robert Long of Christchurch. It cost £800 to build and furnish, including wooden seats, a reading desk and harmonium.

The completed building was opened by the Bishop of Winchester, the Right Rev. Harold Browne, on 5 February 1881, in the presence of approximately 175 people. It was due to be opened the previous month but this was postponed due to a snowstorm. Mary Long died after a short illness at the age of 80 on 17 May 1881.

In addition to holding services, St John's quickly established itself as an important community hub. It was frequently used for meetings by various groups and parties, as well as other events such as lectures and entertainments. Towards the end of the 19th-century, the church became inadequate to serve the needs of the community and two adjoining houses and their gardens were acquired for "mission room purposes" in 1897.

In c. 1912, a platform was added inside the building. The first Holy Communion service was held at St John's on 6 March 1928 after an altar was installed. In 1978, the harmonium was replaced with an electronic instrument.

Today the church holds Evensong on the second Sunday of the month and Holy Communion on the fourth Sunday. Tea and coffee mornings are held each Wednesday, and book and bric-a-brac sales each Saturday.

== Architecture ==
St John's was described in the Pevsner Architectural Guides as a "tiny mission church ... in Tudor Gothic". It is built of red brick with concrete foundations and a slate roof. The building measures approximately 18 feet by 28 feet. It has eight mullion windows, all containing stained glass. A vestry was built at the back of the building. The wall on each side of the door leading to the vestry has two long frames with the Creed, the Lord's Prayer and the Ten Commandments painted in gilt letters. These were created by one of Miss Long's brothers and gifted to St John's by Mr. Lander from St Mary's Church at Bransgore. Gas lighting was originally used in the building via ornamental pendants. In 1958, electric lamps were installed but two pendants were retained and used until 2011.

The building is surrounded by a wall with iron palisading and a pavement of tesselated tiles leads to the double door. New paving was laid in 2016 to provide wheelchair access.

In 2010, a refurbishment of the interior was carried out. A single-storey pitched roof extension was added to the back of the building in 2013 to provide toilet facilities.
