= 1999 Christchurch Borough Council election =

1999 UK local government election

The 1999 Christchurch Borough Council election took place on 6 May 1999 to elect members of Christchurch Borough Council in Dorset, England. The whole council was up for election and the Conservative Party gained overall control of the council from no overall control.

== Election result ==
Christchurch local election result 1999
Party	Seats	Gains	Losses	Net gain/loss	Seats %	Votes %	Votes	+/−
Conservative	17			+9	68.0			
Liberal Democrats	5			-4	20.0			
Independent	3			-5	12.0			

== By-elections between 1999 and 2003 ==
Jumpers by-election 7 June 2001
Party	Candidate	Votes	%	±%
Liberal Democrats		974	37.0	+11.9
Conservative		906	34.4	+9.1
Labour		456	17.3	+7.4
Independent		152	5.8	+5.8
Independent		142	5.4	−34.2
Majority		68	2.6	
Turnout		2,630		
Liberal Democrats hold		Swing		
