= Wednesfield Academy =

Coordinates: 52.6039°N 2.0712°W

Location
- Lichfield Road; Wednesfield; Wolverhampton, West Midlands, WV11 3ES; England

Information
- Former names: University of Wolverhampton Wednesfield Academy Wednesfield High Specialist Engineering Academy Wednesfield High School, A Specialist Engineering College Wednesfield High School Wednesfield Grammar School
- Type: Academy
- Motto: Changing Lives, Shaping Futures
- Established: c. 1960
- Local authority: City of Wolverhampton Council
- Trust: Matrix Academy Trust
- Department for Education URN: 141245 Tables
- Ofsted: Reports
- Headteacher: Joe Phillips
- Gender: Mixed
- Age: 11 to 18
- Enrolment: 1052
- Capacity: 1050
- Houses: Dudley, Kenilworth, Tamworth, Warwick
- Colours: Black, Blue
- Website: wednesfieldacademy.com

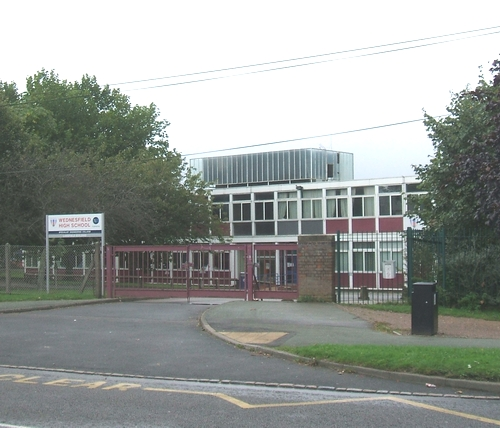
Former Wednesfield High School building.

Wednesfield Academy is a mixed secondary school and sixth form with academy status located in the Wednesfield area of Wolverhampton, West Midlands, England.

Previously a community school administered by Wolverhampton City Council, Wednesfield High School converted to academy status in January 2015 and was renamed Wednesfield High Specialist Engineering Academy. The school was sponsored by the University of Wolverhampton Multi Academy Trust from 2015 to 2023. It is now a member of Walsall-based Matrix Academy Trust however the school continues to coordinate with City of Wolverhampton Council for admissions. In September 2021, the academy was renamed University of Wolverhampton Wednesfield Academy and in January 2023, it was renamed Wednesfield Academy.

Wednesfield Academy offers GCSEs, BTECs and Cambridge Nationals as programmes of study for pupils, while students in the sixth form have the option to study from a range of A-levels and further BTECs.

== Notable alumni ==
• Sureena Brackenridge, Labour MP for Wolverhampton North East
