= Jane Stevenson (politician) =

British politician (born 1971)

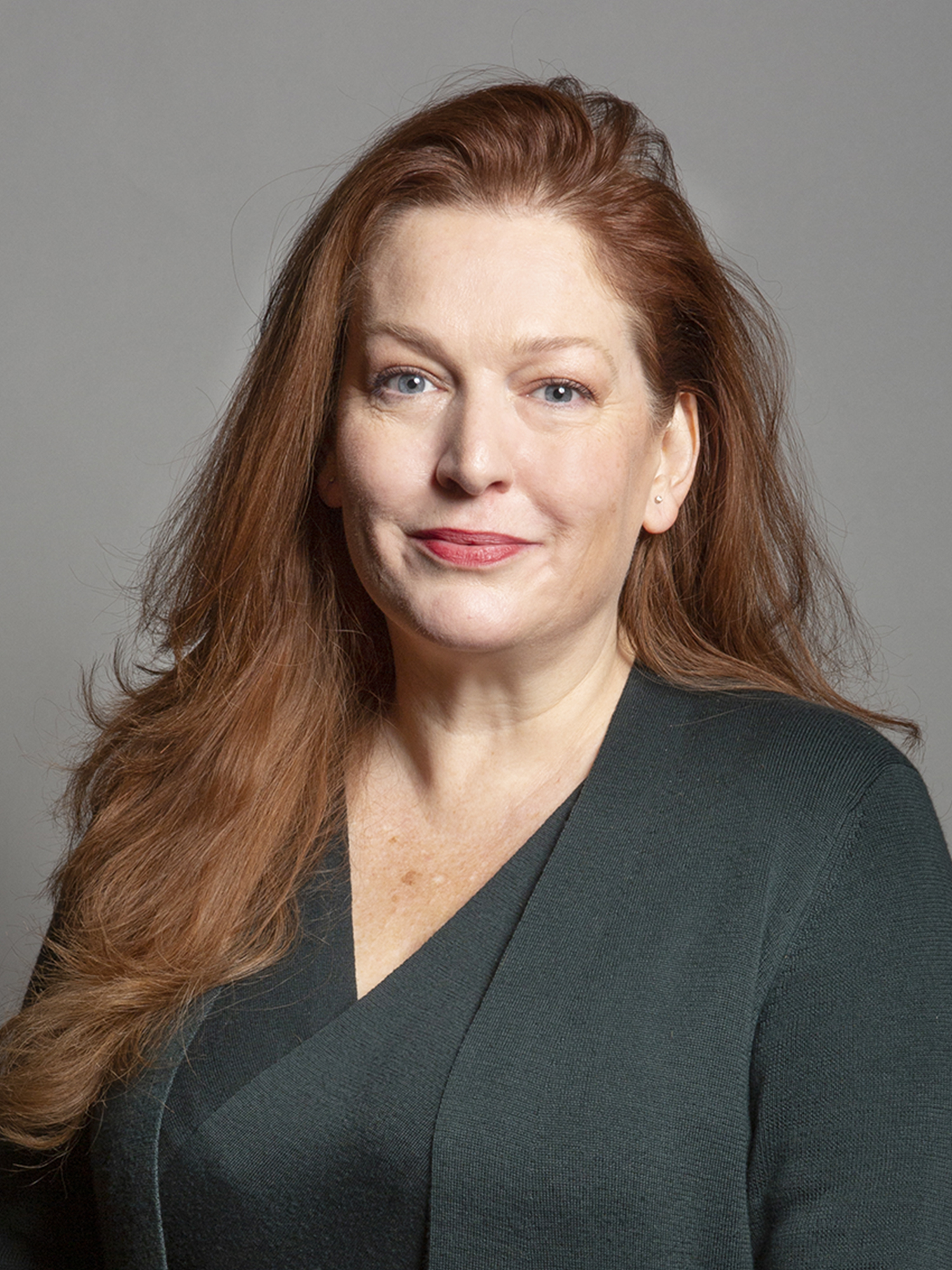
- Official portrait, 2019

Member of Parliament for Wolverhampton North East
- In office 12 December 2019 – 30 May 2024
- Preceded by: Emma Reynolds
- Succeeded by: Sureena Brackenridge

Personal details
- Born: Jane Fiona Catherine Stevenson; 18 February 1971 (age 55) Wolverhampton, Staffordshire
- Party: Reform UK (2026–present)
- Other political affiliations: Conservative (until 2026)
- Education: Wolverhampton Girls' High School; Guildhall School of Music
- Occupation: Politician
- Profession: Singer, soprano

Jane Fiona Catherine Stevenson (born 18 February 1971) is a British Reform UK politician. Until 2026 she was a member of the Conservative Party, and served as the Member of Parliament (MP) for Wolverhampton North East from the 2019 general election until her defeat in the 2024 general election.

== Early life and music career ==
Stevenson was born and raised in Wolverhampton. Her father was from Northern Ireland and settled in Wolverhampton in the 1950s. He lived in Bushbury for the last 30 years of his life. Her mother is from the Mattox family, whose roots in Wednesfield go back to the 18th century.

Before entering politics, Stevenson worked as a classical singer. Having performed with local orchestras while studying at Wolverhampton Girls' High School, she won an entrance scholarship to the Guildhall School of Music in London. After completing post-graduate opera studies. Stevenson freelanced as a soprano soloist for many years. She has also taught singing.

Her singing engagements included roles with English Touring Opera and the Early Opera Company. She also performed at concerts at the Royal Albert Hall and Symphony Hall, Birmingham. International work included the Harare International Festival of the Arts (HIFA) in Zimbabwe and concerts in the United Arab Emirates and Uganda. European cities she performed in included Paris, Rome, Berlin, Salzburg and Vienna. She has also performed in Subotica, Serbia, one of Wolverhampton's twin towns.

== Political career ==
Stevenson has been interested in politics since her teens. She first attended the Conservative Party Conference in the early 1990s with a group from Wolverhampton, which included then MP Nicholas Budgen, one of the original Maastricht Rebels. Having campaigned for Vote Leave in Wolverhampton, in 2016 Stevenson decided to get more involved in the Conservative Party. Before standing for Parliament in 2019, she served as Deputy Chairman (Political) for the Black Country Area and was elected as a city councillor for Wolverhampton in 2018. At the 2019 general election, she defeated the incumbent Labour MP, Emma Reynolds, who had represented the constituency since the 2010 general election. As of March 2020 Stevenson is on the Consolidation, &c., Bills (Joint Committee).

On 16 June 2021, Stevenson introduced a ban on glue traps to Parliament, saying, "When pest control is needed, we have a responsibility to use the most humane methods in order to prevent unnecessary suffering. A rodent stuck in a glue trap will suffer a slow and painful death, which isn't acceptable when other pest control methods are available."

On 16 January 2024, Stevenson resigned her position as parliamentary private secretary to the Secretary of State for Business and Trade, in order to vote for an amendment on the Safety of Rwanda (Asylum and Immigration) Bill.

== Personal life ==
Stevenson is a descendant of the well-known Mattox family in Wolverhampton.

Parliament of the United Kingdom
Preceded by Emma Reynolds	Member of Parliament for Wolverhampton North East; 2019–2024	Succeeded by Sureena Brackenridge
