= Charlotte Devaney =

British DJ, producer, singer, dancer, and actress

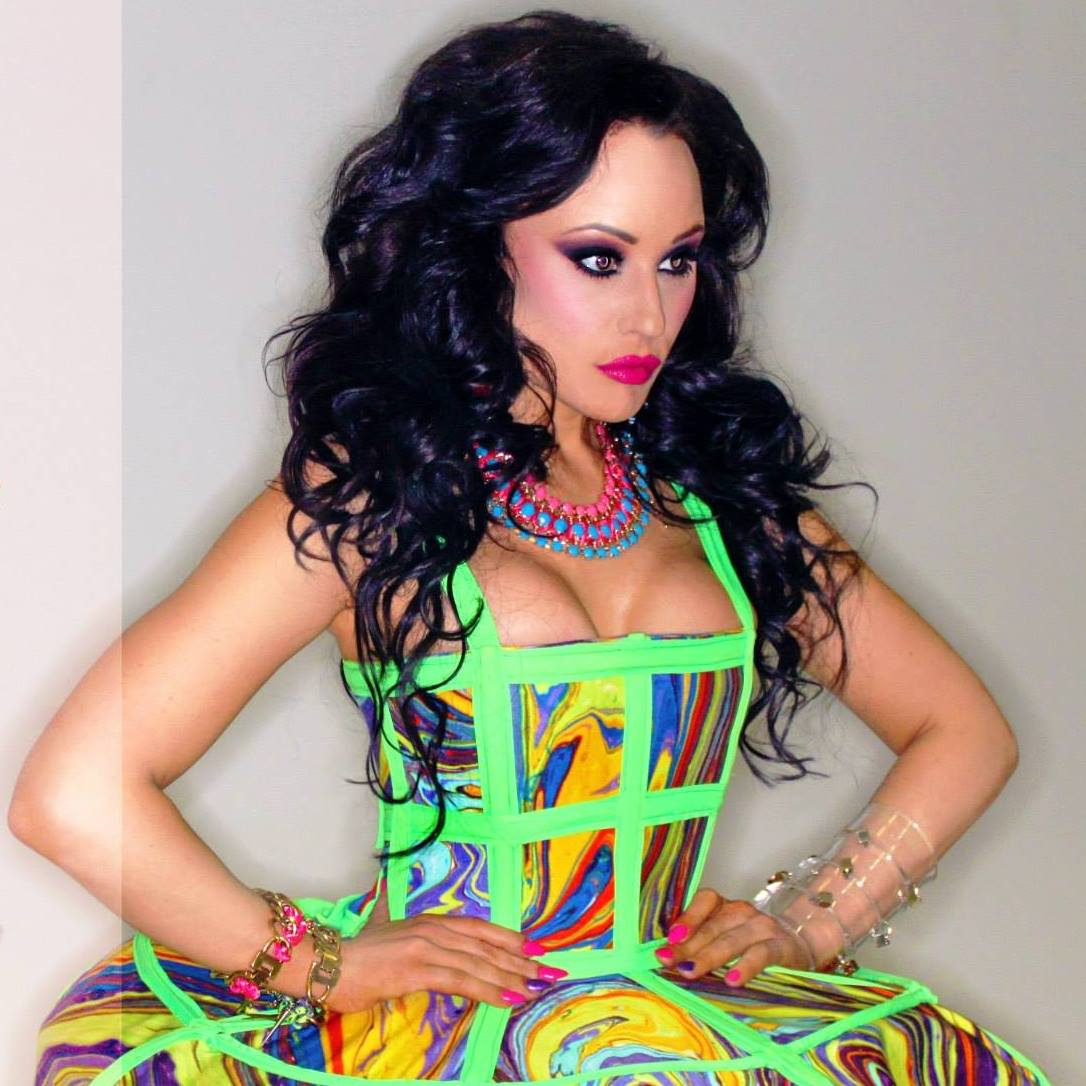
- Devaney in the "Flip It" video shoot

Background information
- Genres: House, Trap, electro house, Breakbeat, Hip hop
- Occupations: DJ, musical artist, actress
- Years active: 2008–present
- Label: Capitol / Virgin Records / Universal Music Australia / Karma London Records
- Website: charlottedevaney.com

Charlotte Devaney is a British DJ, producer, singer, dancer, and actress.

== Career ==
Devaney first founded the dancing collective Narni Shakers, appearing at raves such as One Nation.

Devaney's first major acting appearance was in 2008, portraying the transgender woman Bobbie in the British comedy movie How to Lose Friends & Alienate People.

Devaney's first release "Flip It" featuring Snoop Dogg was first released on Devaney's own label on 2013, but was re-produced as "(The Edit)" and re-released as her first major label single in autumn 2015. The track reached No. 12 in the Australian National Chart and No. 20 in the Polish Airplay Top 100 Charts.

The track received Gold certification in Australia from the ARIA in January 2016 and Platinum certification in March 2016. The track was remixed by house music producer Erick Morillo.

In 2014, Devaney released "Bass Dunk", featuring Fatman Scoop and Lady Leshurr this was re-released as "Bass Dunk (The Edit)" in April 2016, with a further edit by producer Tigermonkey in March 2017.

In August 2017, Devaney released "Lemon Latte" with Houston-born rapper Riff Raff.

Devaney has worked with Snoop Dogg, Fatman Scoop, Lady Leshurr, the Ragga Twins, Rich the Kid and Riff Raff (rapper) and many more on music released through her own record label, Karma London Records.

In January 2018, Devaney joined forces with People for the Ethical Treatment of Animals (PETA) in a campaign promoting her single "Avocado" featuring American rapper Rich the Kid.

In July 2018, Devaney released "You Got It". featuring British singer and The Voice UK semi-finalist Tanya Lacey The track was launched along with an article by Avid Technology

On 31 October 2018, Devaney released "Animal" with LA Rapper Lil Debbie and New York rapper Knytro.

== Curtis Woodman incident ==
In January 2014, Devaney and five others were acquitted of kidnapping, following a three-and-a-half week trial at Bristol Crown Court. The six were accused of kidnapping businessman Curtis Woodman in September 2012, who failed to pay them £42,000 in wages. Devaney later said that the story could be turned into a film, and that she was in discussion with producers.

== Personal life ==
Devaney is the granddaughter of former Labour MP Renée Short.

Devaney's partner is drum and bass DJ Fabio.

== Singles ==
- "Nice" (2012)
- "Flip It" ft Snoop Dogg (2013)
- "Bass Dunk" ft Fatman Scoop & Lady Leshurr (2014)
- "Squashed" (2014)
- "Pop It" (2014)
- "Get Ready 4 Tha Drop" ft Ragga Twins (2015)
- "Flip It (The Edit)" ft Snoop Dogg (2015)
- "Pull Up" w/ MC Neat (2016)
- "Bass Dunk (The Edit)" ft Fatman Scoop & Lady Leshurr (2016)
- "Bass Dunk (Tigermonkey Edit)" ft Fatman Scoop & Lady Leshurr (2017)
- "Lemon Latte" ft Riff Raff (2017)
- "Avocado" ft Rich the Kid (2018)
- "You Got It" ft Tanya Lacey (2018)
- "Animal" ft Lil Lil Debbie & Knytro (2018)
- "Blueberry" ft Bali Baby (2019)
- "Boogie" ft Aliki (2020)
- "Spell It" (2020)
