= Wolverhampton North East =

Parliamentary constituency in the United Kingdom, 1950 onwards

Coordinates: 52.60°N 2.084°W

- Borough constituency for the House of Commons
- Boundaries since 2024
- Boundary of Wolverhampton North East in West Midlands region
- County: West Midlands
- Electorate: 60,354 (December 2010)

Current constituency
- Created: 1950
- Member of Parliament: Sureena Brackenridge (Labour)
- Seats: One
- Created from: Wolverhampton East and Wolverhampton West

Wolverhampton North East is a borough constituency represented in the House of Commons of the Parliament of the United Kingdom. It elects one Member of Parliament (MP) by the first past the post system of election. It is represented by Sureena Brackenridge of the Labour Party, who was elected at the 2024 general election.

== Boundaries ==
=== Historic ===
1950–1955: The County Borough of Wolverhampton wards of Bushbury, Dunstall, Heath Town, Low Hill, Park, St James', St Mary's, and St Peter's.

1955–1974: The County Borough of Wolverhampton wards of Bushbury, Dunstall, Heath Town, Low Hill, St James', St Mary's, and St Peter's.

1974–1983: The County Borough of Wolverhampton wards of Bushbury, Eastfield, Low Hill, Oxley, Wednesfield Heath, Wednesfield North, and Wednesfield South.

1983–2010: The Metropolitan Borough of Wolverhampton wards of Bushbury, Fallings Park, Heath Town, Low Hill, Oxley, Wednesfield North, and Wednesfield South.

2010–2024: The City of Wolverhampton wards of Bushbury North, Bushbury South and Low Hill, Fallings Park, Heath Town, Oxley, Wednesfield North, and Wednesfield South (as they existed on 12 April 2005).

=== Current ===
Further to the 2023 review of Westminster constituencies, which was based on the ward structure in place on 1 December 2020, and taking into account the local government boundary review in the City of Wolverhampton which came into effect in May 2023, the constituency comprises the following from the 2024 general election:

- The Metropolitan Borough of Walsall wards of: Short Heath; Willenhall North.
- The City of Wolverhampton wards of: Bushbury North (most); Bushbury South and Low Hill; Fallings Park; Heath Town; Wednesfield North; Wednesfield South; and small parts of the Oxley and St Peter's wards.

The constituency lost the Oxley ward (as defined in 2020) to Wolverhampton West and gained Short Heath and the Willenhall North ward (encompassing the community of New Invention) from Walsall North.

Wolverhampton North East is one of three constituencies covering the city of Wolverhampton, covering the northern and north-eastern parts of the city. The boundaries run east from the city centre towards Willenhall and north-west towards Tettenhall. The Conservatives are strongest in Bushbury North and the two Walsall wards, with the remaining areas more favourable to Labour.

== History ==
Wolverhampton North East was notable in the 1987 general election for being one of only a small number of seats that the Conservatives gained from Labour. It reverted to type, however, at the 1992 general election, when the Labour MP Ken Purchase first took office. It is one of the 'red wall' Labour seats that elected a Conservative MP at the 2019 general election, helping then-Prime Minister Boris Johnson achieve a majority of 80. This was reversed when Labour retook the seat at the 2024 general election.

In 1966, 6% of the constituency was born in the New Commonwealth.

== Members of Parliament ==
Election	Member	Party
1950	John Baird	Labour
1964	Renée Short	Labour
1987	Maureen Hicks	Conservative
1992	Ken Purchase	Labour Co-op
2010	Emma Reynolds	Labour
2019	Jane Stevenson	Conservative
2024	Sureena Brackenridge	Labour

== Elections ==
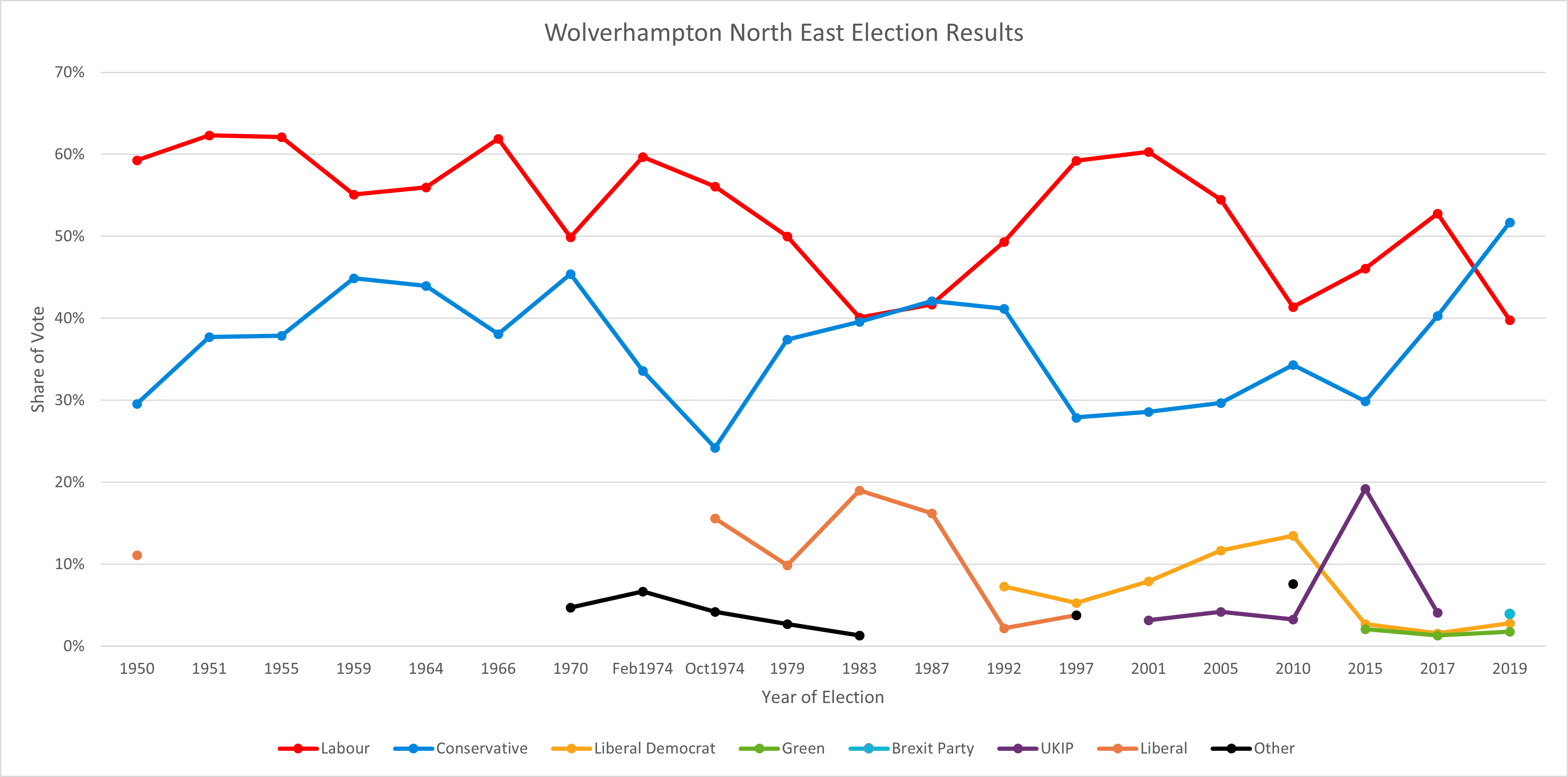
Wolverhampton North East election results (1950–2019)

=== Elections in the 2020s ===
General election 2024: Wolverhampton North East
Party	Candidate	Votes	%	±%
Labour	Sureena Brackenridge	14,282	42.9	▲7.0
Conservative	Jane Stevenson	8,860	26.6	▼29.1
Reform UK	Paul Williams	7,721	23.2	▲20.2
Green	Kwaku Tano-Yeboah	1,424	4.3	▲2.5
Liberal Democrats	Peter Thornton	1,002	3.0	▼0.6
Majority		5,422	16.3	new
Turnout		33,289	47.0	▼9.1
Labour gain from Conservative		Swing	▲18.1	

=== Elections in the 2010s ===
General election 2019: Wolverhampton North East
Party	Candidate	Votes	%	±%
Conservative	Jane Stevenson	17,722	51.7	+11.4
Labour	Emma Reynolds	13,642	39.8	−13.0
Brexit Party	Vishal Khatri	1,354	3.9	New
Liberal Democrats	Richard Maxwell	960	2.8	+1.2
Green	Andrea Cantrill	603	1.8	+0.5
Majority		4,080	11.9	N/A
Turnout		34,281	55.4	−4.6
Conservative gain from Labour		Swing	+12.2	

Wolverhampton North East had the 16th lowest turnout of any UK constituency in the 2019 General Election.

General election 2017: Wolverhampton North East
Party	Candidate	Votes	%	±%
Labour	Emma Reynolds	19,282	52.8	+6.7
Conservative	Sarah Macken	14,695	40.3	+10.4
UKIP	Graham Eardley	1,479	4.1	−15.1
Liberal Democrats	Ian Jenkins	570	1.6	−1.1
Green	Clive Wood	482	1.3	−0.8
Majority		4,587	12.5	−3.7
Turnout		36,508	60.0	+4.3
Labour hold		Swing	-1.8	

General election 2015: Wolverhampton North East
Party	Candidate	Votes	%	±%
Labour	Emma Reynolds	15,669	46.1	+4.7
Conservative	Darren Henry	10,174	29.9	−4.4
UKIP	Star Etheridge	6,524	19.2	+15.9
Liberal Democrats	Ian Jenkins	935	2.7	−10.8
Green	Becky Cooper	701	2.1	New
Majority		5,495	16.2	+9.1
Turnout		34,003	55.7	−3.1
Labour hold		Swing	+4.6	

UKIP originally selected Simon Ellis as candidate in 2015.

General election 2010: Wolverhampton North East
Party	Candidate	Votes	%	±%
Labour	Emma Reynolds	14,448	41.4	−13.3
Conservative	Julie Rook	11,964	34.3	+4.7
Liberal Democrats	Colin Ross	4,711	13.5	+1.9
BNP	Simon Patten	2,296	6.6	New
UKIP	Paul Valdmanis	1,138	3.3	−0.8
Socialist Labour	Shangara Singh Bhatoe	337	1.0	New
Majority		2,484	7.1	−17.6
Turnout		34,894	58.8	+3.4
Labour hold		Swing	-9.0	

=== Elections in the 2000s ===
General election 2005: Wolverhampton North East
Party	Candidate	Votes	%	±%
Labour Co-op	Ken Purchase	17,948	54.5	−5.8
Conservative	Alexandra Robson	9,792	29.7	+1.1
Liberal Democrats	David Jack	3,845	11.7	+3.8
UKIP	Lydia Simpson	1,371	4.2	+1.0
Majority		8,156	24.8	−6.9
Turnout		32,956	54.4	+1.7
Labour Co-op hold		Swing	-3.5	

General election 2001: Wolverhampton North East
Party	Candidate	Votes	%	±%
Labour Co-op	Ken Purchase	18,984	60.3	+1.1
Conservative	Maria Miller	9,019	28.6	+0.7
Liberal Democrats	Steven Bourne	2,494	7.9	+2.6
UKIP	Thomas McCartney	997	3.2	New
Majority		9,965	31.7	+0.4
Turnout		31,494	52.8	−14.3
Labour Co-op hold		Swing		

=== Elections in the 1990s ===
General election 1997: Wolverhampton North East
Party	Candidate	Votes	%	±%
Labour Co-op	Ken Purchase	24,534	59.2	+9.9
Conservative	David Harvey	11,547	27.9	−13.3
Liberal Democrats	Brian Niblett	2,214	5.3	−2.0
Liberal	Colin Hallmark	1,560	3.8	+1.6
Referendum	Andrew Muchall	1,192	2.9	New
National Democrats	Martin Wingfield	356	0.9	New
Majority		12,987	31.3	+23.2
Turnout		41,403	67.1	−10.9
Labour Co-op hold		Swing		

General election 1992: Wolverhampton North East
Party	Candidate	Votes	%	±%
Labour Co-op	Ken Purchase	24,106	49.3	+7.2
Conservative	Maureen Hicks	20,167	41.2	−0.5
Liberal Democrats	Malcolm Gwinnett	3,546	7.3	−8.9
Liberal	Kenneth Bullman	1,087	2.2	New
Majority		3,939	8.1	N/A
Turnout		48,906	78.0	+3.7
Labour Co-op gain from Conservative		Swing	+3.9	

=== Elections in the 1980s ===
General election 1987: Wolverhampton North East
Party	Candidate	Votes	%	±%
Conservative	Maureen Hicks	19,857	42.1	+2.5
Labour	Ken Purchase	19,653	41.7	+1.6
Alliance (Liberal)	Malcolm Pearson	7,623	16.2	−2.8
Majority		204	0.4	N/A
Turnout		47,133	74.3	+4.0
Conservative gain from Labour		Swing		

General election 1983: Wolverhampton North East
Party	Candidate	Votes	%	±%
Labour	Renée Short	17,941	40.1	−9.9
Conservative	Anthony Burnside	17,727	39.6	+2.2
Alliance (Liberal)	Raymond Yarnell	8,524	19.0	+9.1
National Front	Charles Baugh	585	1.3	−1.4
Majority		214	0.5	−12.1
Turnout		44,777	70.3	−0.4
Labour hold		Swing	-6.0	

=== Elections in the 1970s ===
General election 1979: Wolverhampton North East
Party	Candidate	Votes	%	±%
Labour	Renée Short	24,046	50.0	−6.1
Conservative	Jonathan Evans	17,986	37.4	+13.2
Liberal	L. McLean	4,760	9.9	−5.7
National Front	G Cooper	1,283	2.7	−1.5
Majority		6,060	12.6	−19.3
Turnout		48,075	70.7	+4.5
Labour hold		Swing		

General election October 1974: Wolverhampton North East
Party	Candidate	Votes	%	±%
Labour	Renée Short	25,788	56.1	−3.6
Conservative	Warren Hawksley	11,135	24.2	−9.4
Liberal	John Porter	7,156	15.6	New
National Front	Anthony Webber	1,928	4.2	−1.1
Majority		14,653	31.9	+5.8
Turnout		46,007	66.2	−4.3
Labour hold		Swing	+2.9	

General election February 1974: Wolverhampton North East
Party	Candidate	Votes	%	±%
Labour	Renée Short	28,935	59.7	+9.7
Conservative	Warren Hawksley	16,318	33.6	−11.7
National Front	Anthony Webber	2,548	5.3	+0.6
British Movement	John Colin Jordan	711	1.4	New
Majority		12,617	26.1	+11.4
Turnout		48,512	70.5	
Labour hold		Swing	10.6	

General election 1970: Wolverhampton North East
Party	Candidate	Votes	%	±%
Labour	Renée Short	16,851	49.9	−12.0
Conservative	Geoffrey Ian Wright	15,358	45.4	+7.3
National Front	Sheila Mary Wright	1,592	4.7	New
Majority		1,493	4.5	−19.3
Turnout		33,801	65.9	−3.4
Labour hold		Swing		

=== Elections in the 1960s ===
General election 1966: Wolverhampton North East
Party	Candidate	Votes	%	±%
Labour	Renée Short	21,067	61.9	+5.9
Conservative	Geoffrey Wright	12,965	38.1	−5.9
Majority		8,102	23.8	+11.8
Turnout		34,032	69.3	+1.3
Labour hold		Swing		

General election 1964: Wolverhampton North East
Party	Candidate	Votes	%	±%
Labour	Renée Short	18,997	56.0	+0.9
Conservative	Miranda Greenaway	14,914	43.98	−0.9
Majority		4,083	12.0	+1.8
Turnout		33,911	68.0	−2.4
Labour hold		Swing		

=== Elections in the 1950s ===
General election 1959: Wolverhampton North East
Party	Candidate	Votes	%	±%
Labour	John Baird	20,436	55.1	−7.0
Conservative	Oscar A Pomeroy	16,639	44.9	+7.0
Majority		3,797	10.2	−14.0
Turnout		37,075	72.4	+1.0
Labour hold		Swing		

General election 1955: Wolverhampton North East
Party	Candidate	Votes	%	±%
Labour	John Baird	23,596	62.1	−0.2
Conservative	Fred Hardman	14,387	37.9	+0.2
Majority		9,209	24.2	−0.4
Turnout		37,983	71.4	−9.5
Labour hold		Swing		

General election 1951: Wolverhampton North East
Party	Candidate	Votes	%	±%
Labour	John Baird	30,643	62.3	+3.0
National Liberal	John PJ Ellis	18,563	37.7	+8.1
Majority		12,080	24.6	−5.1
Turnout		49,206	80.9	−2.2
Labour hold		Swing		

General election 1950: Wolverhampton North East
Party	Candidate	Votes	%	±%
Labour	John Baird	29,235	59.3	
Conservative	A.G.H. Holland	14,592	29.6	
Liberal	Arthur Brown	5,482	11.1	
Majority		14,643	29.7	
Turnout		49,309	83.1	
Labour win (new seat)				

== See also ==
- List of MPs for Wolverhampton
- List of parliamentary constituencies in Wolverhampton
- Parliamentary constituencies in the West Midlands (county)
- List of parliamentary constituencies in West Midlands (region)
