= St Luke's Church, Burton =

Church in Dorset, England

St Luke's Church
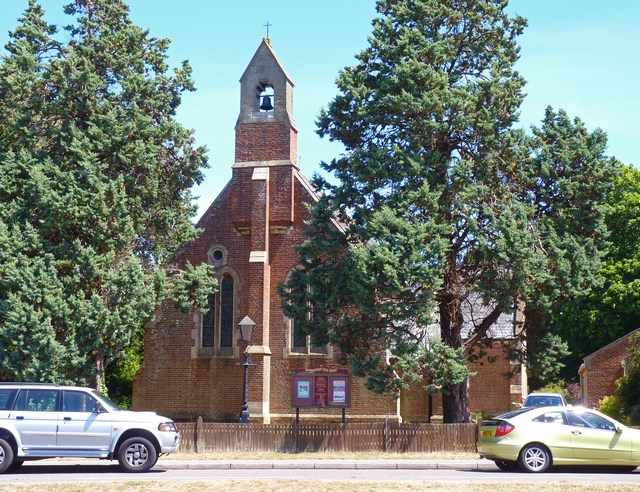

Religion
- Affiliation: Church of England
- Ecclesiastical or organizational status: Active
- Year consecrated: 1876

Location
- Location: Burton, Dorset, England
- Interactive map of St Luke's Church
- Coordinates: 50.7532°N 1.7649°W

Architecture
- Architects: Benjamin Ferrey & Son
- Type: Church

St. Luke's Church is a Church of England parish church in Burton, Dorset, England. It was designed by Benjamin Ferrey & Son and opened in 1875. The church has been a Grade II listed building since 1976. Historic England describe St Luke's as a "pleasing Victorian Gothic village church", with "a careful use of materials", "good Victorian fittings" and "a sense of honest simplicity".

== History ==
St Luke's was built to replace an earlier chapel of ease which had been erected in Burton around 1836. A plot of land for the new church was donated by Sir George Tapps-Gervis-Meyrick of Hinton Admiral and the plans drawn up by Messrs. Benjamin Ferrey & Son. The foundation stone was laid by the Bishop of Winchester, the Right Rev. Harold Browne, on 15 April 1874 and the church built by Mr. Joseph Lander of Burton.

St Luke's was opened on 25 October 1875, but not consecrated until 2 November 1876 by the Right Rev Dr. Francis McDougall, suffragan to the Bishop of Winchester. Burton became its own parish in 1877, with St Luke's as the parish church.

== Architecture ==
St Luke's is built of red brick, with dressings in Bath stone and roofs of blue slate, in the Early Gothic style. It was designed to accommodate over 300 persons, and is made up of a nave, chancel, south transept, vestry and south porch. The turret on the west gable contains one bell. Internal fittings include a stone font, oak lectern and reading desk. The benches and chairs are carved from deal. The church's floor was laid with concrete and wood, and the chancel paved with encaustic tiles from Minton, Hollands and Co.

At the time of its opening in 1875, it was intended to commence work on the addition of a north transept and enlargement of the chancel in the near future. Owing to limited funds, temporary walls had been erected with this intention, but the proposed work was never carried out. The stained glass of the east and west windows was installed by Thomas Figgis Curtis of Ward and Hughes in 1899–1900.
