= Renée Short =

British journalist and politician

Member of Parliament for Wolverhampton North East
- In office 15 October 1964 – 18 May 1987
- Preceded by: John Baird
- Succeeded by: Maureen Hicks

Personal details
- Born: Renée Gill; 26 April 1919 Leamington Spa, England
- Died: 18 January 2003 (aged 83)
- Party: Labour
- Spouse: Andrew Short (m. 1940)
- Children: 2
- Relatives: Charlotte Devaney (granddaughter)
- Education: University of Manchester
- Profession: Journalism

Renée Short (née Gill; 26 April 1919 – 18 January 2003) was a British Labour politician who served as Member of Parliament for Wolverhampton North East from 1964 to 1987.

== Early life ==
Born in Leamington Spa, she had a Jewish mother but was brought up by her Church of England grandparents. She was educated at Nottingham County Grammar School and Manchester University. She was a journalist. Active in the Labour and Co-operative Parties, she served as a councillor on Hertfordshire County Council from 1952 to 1967 and Watford Rural District Council from 1952 to 1956.

== Parliamentary career ==
Short contested St. Albans at the 1955 general election and Watford in the 1959 election.

At the 1964 general election, she was elected to succeed John Baird as Member of Parliament for Wolverhampton North East. She retained her seat at six subsequent general elections until her retirement at the 1987 election. In the Conservative landslide at the 1983 general election she held her seat by just 214 votes, and after she stood down her old seat was won by the Conservative candidate Maureen Hicks. She also served on the Labour National Executive Committee from 1970 to 1981 and from 1983 to 1988.

Short was on the left wing of the Labour Party and often clashed with her constituency neighbour Enoch Powell. She was an early advocate of abortion reform. She was for many years national president of the Campaign for Nursery Education, and of the Nursery Schools Association; and she was vice-president of the Women's National Cancer Control Campaign. She had hopes of being appointed to the government in 1974 but believed she had suffered by openly stating her ambition on the BBC TV election results programme (she said "If Harold's any sense, he'll know what to do").

== Later life ==
Later in her career she received a regular credit as "Parliamentary Adviser" to the Yorkshire Television sitcom The New Statesman.

== Family ==
She married, in 1940, Dr Andrew Short; they had two daughters.

Her granddaughter is actress and singer Charlotte Devaney.

Parliament of the United Kingdom
Preceded by John Baird	Member of Parliament for Wolverhampton North East; 1964–1987	Succeeded by Maureen Hicks
