= John Baird (Wolverhampton MP) =

British politician, born 1906

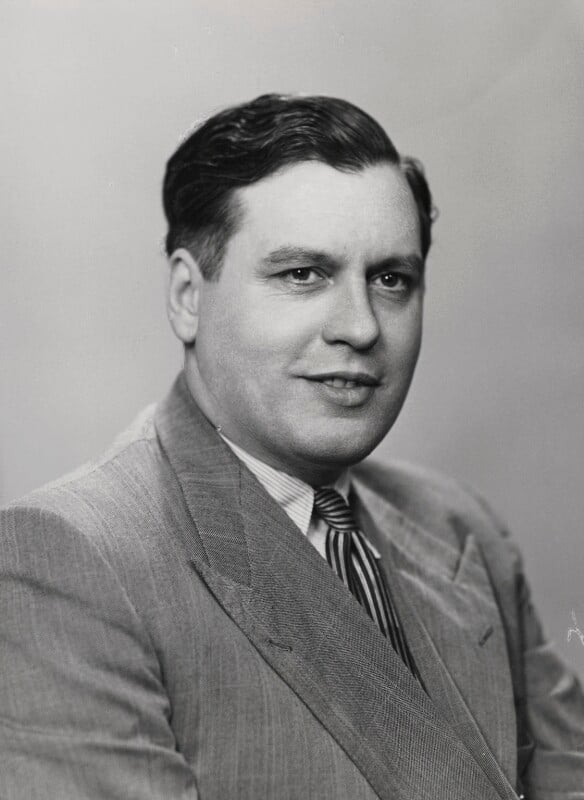
Baird in 1950

John Baird (26 May 1906 – 21 March 1965) was a British dental surgeon and Labour Party politician.

Born in Glasgow, he was the son of Alexander and Mary Baird. After leaving school he worked as a coalminer, before attending St. Mungo's Medical School to study dentistry. He qualified in 1929, and was admitted to the Royal Faculty Physicians and Surgeons. In 1933, he married Agnes Kerr of Castle Douglas and the couple had two children.

In 1928, Baird become active in Labour politics in Glasgow. He moved his dental practice to the north of England and then to the London area. At the outbreak of the Second World War in 1939, Baird joined the Army Dental Corps, reaching the rank of captain.

He was elected to the House of Commons in the Labour landslide at the 1945 general election, when he defeated the long-serving Liberal MP Geoffrey Mander.

When his constituency was abolished for the 1950 general election, Baird was returned to Parliament for the new Wolverhampton North East. He held that seat until he stepped down at the 1964 general election.

In parliament he took an interest in health and social insurance issues. He was a strong opponent of racism, and also sought to form better relations with Communist countries, visiting the Soviet Union and People's Republic of China.

According to John Callaghan, Baird should be "counted as the first Trotskyist MP" for assistance he gave to the Revolutionary Socialist League, later known as Militant. Pierre Frank commented that he "was always on our side".

Baird died in a London hospital in 1965, aged 58.

Parliament of the United Kingdom
Preceded by Geoffrey Mander	Member of Parliament for Wolverhampton East; 1945–1950	Constituency abolished
New constituency	Member of Parliament for Wolverhampton North East; 1950–1964	Succeeded by Renee Short
