= Christchurch town centre =

Town centre and shopping district in Christchurch

Christchurch town centre is the town centre of Christchurch, a town in Dorset. The town centre is a major shopping district.

== History ==
In 2014, Christchurch Borough Council planned for a piazza and traffic restrictions.

In 2020, plans for a revamp of the town centre were announced.

== Buildings ==
- The Town Hall
- Saxon Square

== Politics ==
Christchurch town centre is part of the Christchurch parliamentary constituency for elections to the House of Commons. It is currently represented by Conservative MP Christopher Chope.

The town centre was part of the Town Centre ward which elected two councillors to Christchurch Borough Council.

The town centre is currently part of the Christchurch Town ward and elects two Councillors to Bournemouth, Christchurch and Poole Council.
