= Sureena Brackenridge =

British politician

Sureena Brackenridge MP
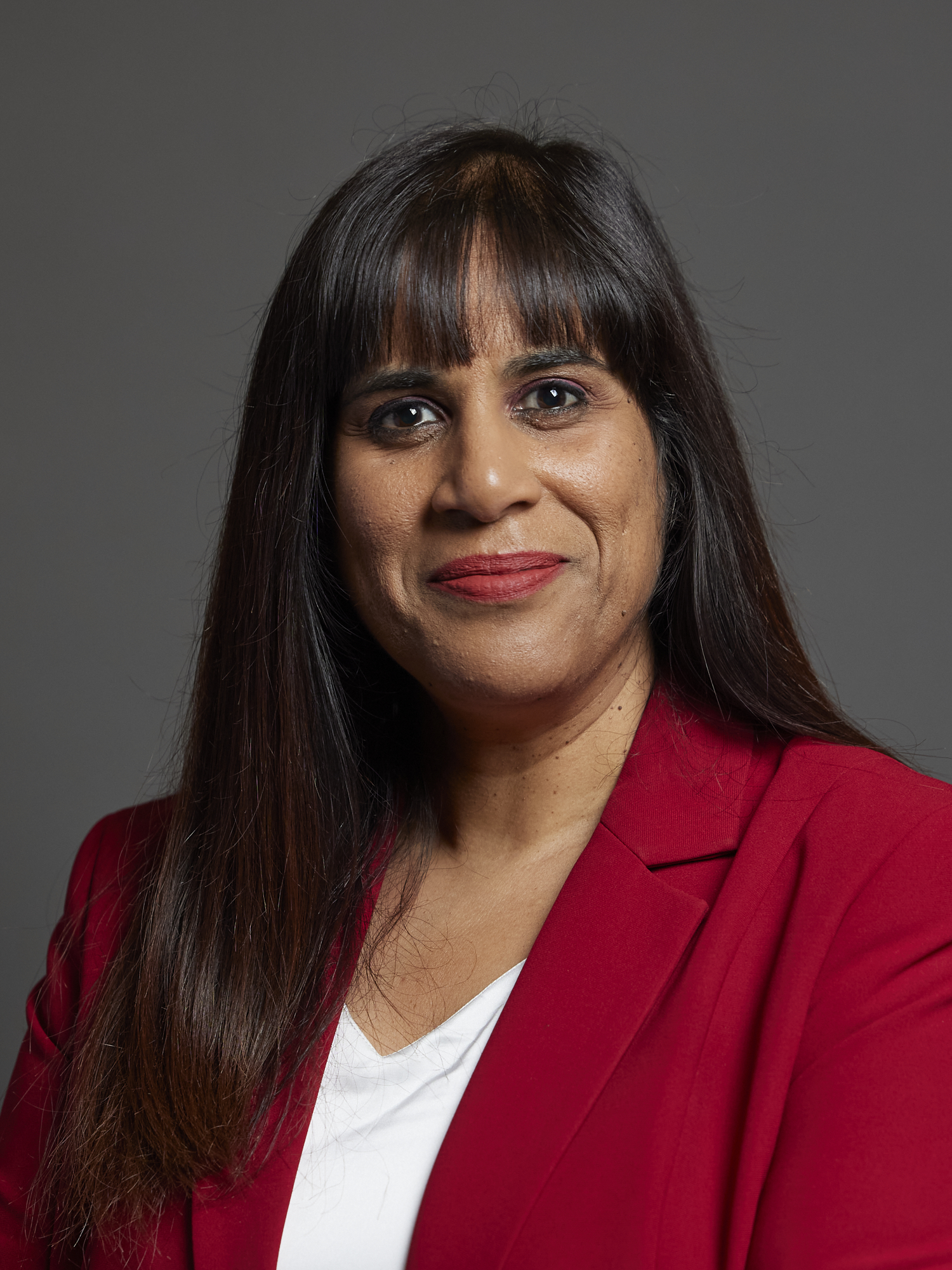
- Official portrait, 2024

Member of Parliament for Wolverhampton North East
- Incumbent
- Assumed office 4 July 2024
- Preceded by: Jane Stevenson
- Majority: 5,422 (16.3%)

Mayoress of Wolverhampton
- In role 19 May 2021 – 18 May 2022
- Mayor: Greg Brackenridge
- Preceded by: Paul Darke
- Succeeded by: Karl Samuels

Personal details
- Born: 1974 or 1975 (age 51–52) Wednesfield, West Midlands, England
- Party: Labour
- Spouse: Greg Brackenridge
- Children: 2
- Education: Wednesfield High School
- Alma mater: University of Wolverhampton (BSc)
- Occupation: Politician; Teacher

Sureena Brackenridge (born 1975) is a British Labour Party politician who has served as Member of Parliament (MP) for Wolverhampton North East since July 2024.

== Early life ==
Sureena Brackenridge was born and raised on the Ashmore Park council estate in Wednesfield. Her parents, who are of Indian descent, had migrated from Fiji as young adults.

== Career ==
=== Teaching ===
Brackenridge obtained a bachelor’s degree in biochemistry from the University of Wolverhampton. She then volunteered at the Molineux Study Centre, working with teenagers from severely disadvantaged backgrounds and later obtained a Postgraduate Certificate in Education from the University of Wolverhampton.

Brackenridge worked in local secondary schools as a science teacher, before becoming deputy head teacher at Moseley Park school.

=== Political ===
Brackenridge was selected as the Labour Party candidate for Wolverhampton North East in November 2022. She was elected as the MP for Wolverhampton North East in the 2024 general election with a majority of 5,422 votes. She made her maiden speech on 25 July and was appointed to the Education Select Committee in October 2024.

In November 2024, Brackenridge voted against the Terminally Ill Adults (End of Life) Bill.

She has made parliamentary contributions on education, apprenticeship and training issues; supporting Free Breakfast Clubs and VAT on independent schools.

Brackenridge backed calls from Jamie Oliver to improve how schools identify and support children with dyslexia. She was among those to contribute to the Channel 4 programme Jamie's Dyslexia Revolution, where she argued the answer was "better teacher training, not an hour after a very busy school day. It's not rocket science, but with a change in culture... we can do this”.

In June 2025, Brackenridge led a Public and Westminster Hall debate on deprived / disadvantaged neighbourhoods. In September 2025, the government announced the second phase of the ‘Pride in Place / Plan for Neighbourhoods' programme, allocating £3.38 billion targeting these areas. Brackenridge’s constituency received an allocation of the funding.

== Personal life ==
Sureena Brackenridge is married to Greg Brackenridge, who served as the 162nd Mayor of Wolverhampton from 2021 to 2022; Sureena was the mayoress of Wolverhampton during his tenure. They have two children together.

Parliament of the United Kingdom
Previous: Jane Stevenson	Member of Parliament for Wolverhampton North East; 2024–present	Incumbent
