= Ken Purchase =

British politician (1939–2016)

Member of Parliament for Wolverhampton North East
- In office 9 April 1992 – 12 April 2010
- Preceded by: Maureen Hicks
- Succeeded by: Emma Reynolds

Personal details
- Born: Kenneth Purchase; 8 January 1939 Wolverhampton, England
- Died: 28 August 2016 (aged 77) Wolverhampton, England
- Party: Labour and Co-operative
- Spouse: Brenda Sanders (m. 1960)
- Children: 2
- Education: University of Wolverhampton

Kenneth Purchase (8 January 1939 – 28 August 2016) was a British Labour Co-operative politician who served as the Member of Parliament (MP) for Wolverhampton North East from 1992 to 2010.

== Early life ==
He attended Springfield Secondary Modern School (became Woden Primary School) on Springfield Road in Wolverhampton. At Wolverhampton Polytechnic, (now Wolverhampton University) he gained a BA in Social Science. Ken worked as a co-operative development officer. He was an apprentice toolmaker in the foundry industry from 1956–60 at the firm of Arthur Shaw & Company at Willenhall From 1960–8, he worked in experimental component development in the aerospace industry. From 1968–76, he was a toolroom machinist in the car industry. He worked in the property division of Telford Development Corporation. From 1981–2, he was a housing officer in the Housing Department of Walsall Metropolitan Borough Council. From 1982–92, he was a Business Development Advisor at Black Country CDA Ltd. He was a councillor on Wolverhampton Metropolitan Borough Council from 1970–90.

== Parliamentary career ==
He unsuccessfully contested Wolverhampton North East in 1987, before winning at the next general election in 1992. He served as Parliamentary Private Secretary to Robin Cook for six years.

On 27 October 2007 Purchase announced his intention to retire at the next general election.

== Personal life ==
He married Brenda Sanders on 20 August 1960 in Rowley Regis. They had two daughters, Samantha and Lisa, who survived him. He died in August 2016 aged 77 and was cremated at Bushbury Crematorium, Wolverhampton.

Parliament of the United Kingdom
Preceded by Maureen Hicks	Member of Parliament for Wolverhampton North East; 1992–2010	Succeeded by Emma Reynolds
