= Burton and Winkton =

Civil parish in Dorset, England

Coordinates: 50.758°N 1.757°W

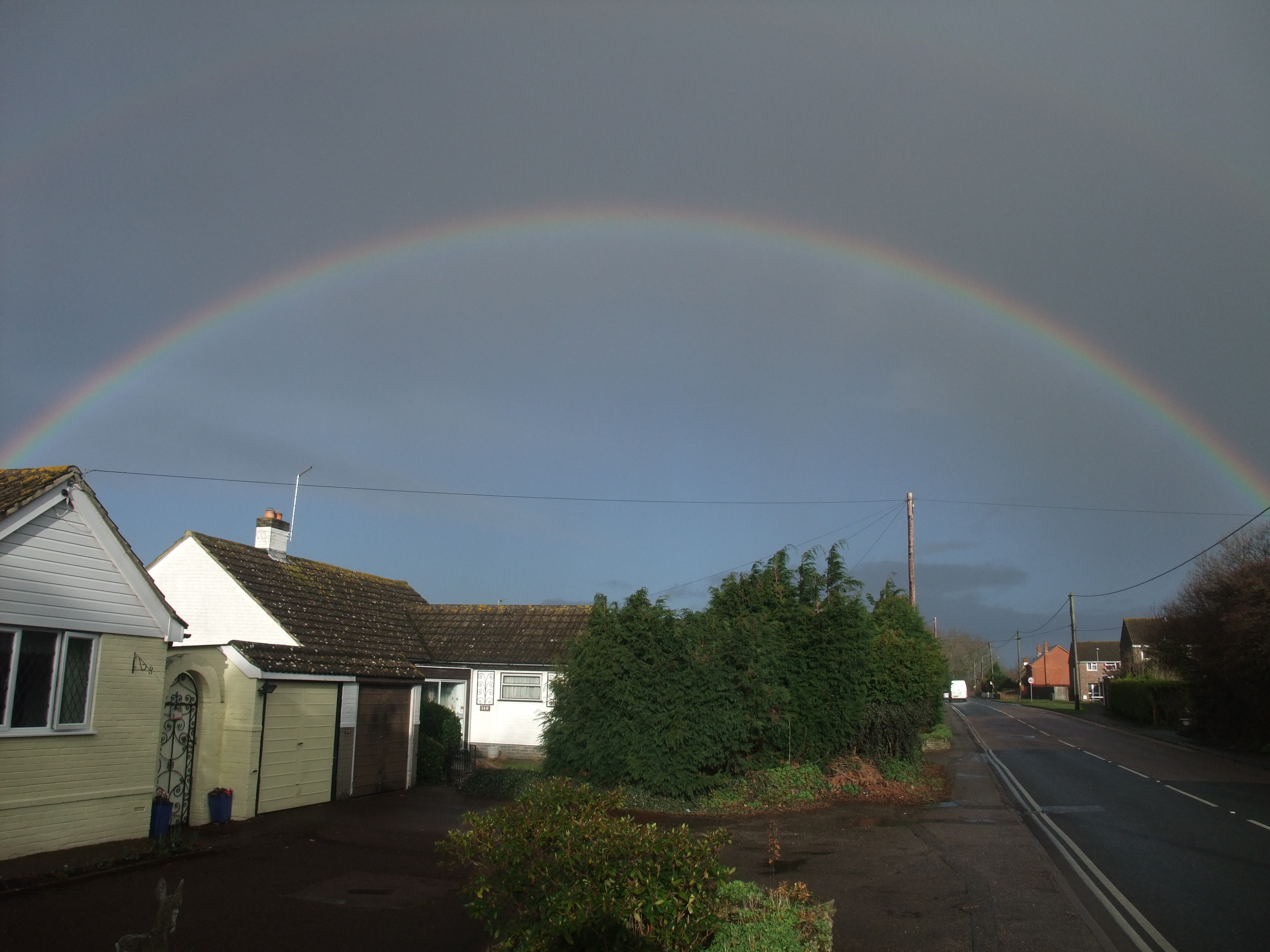
- Burton

- Location within Dorset
- Population: 4,347 (Census, 2011)
- Civil parish: Burton and Winkton
- Unitary authority: Bournemouth, Christchurch and Poole
- Ceremonial county: Dorset
- Region: South West
- Country: England
- Sovereign state: United Kingdom
- Post town: BOURNEMOUTH
- Postcode district: BH23
- Dialling code: 01202
- Police: Dorset
- Fire: Dorset and Wiltshire
- Ambulance: South Western
- UK Parliament: Christchurch

Burton and Winkton is a civil parish in Bournemouth, Christchurch and Poole in Dorset, England. It includes Burton and Winkton. In 2011 the parish had a population of 4347. The parish was renamed from "Burton" to "Burton and Winkton" on 31 March 2019.

== See also ==
- List of civil parishes in Dorset
