= 2007 Christchurch Borough Council election =

2007 UK local government election

Map of the results of the 2007 Christchurch Borough Council election. Conservatives in blue, Liberal Democrats in yellow and independents in grey.

The 2007 Christchurch Borough Council election took place on 3 May 2007 to elect members of Christchurch Borough Council in Dorset, England. The whole council was up for election and the Conservative Party stayed in overall control of the council.

== Background ==
After the last election in 2003 the Conservatives had a majority on the council with 14 councillors, compared to 8 for the Liberal Democrats and 2 independents. This majority increased when both of the Liberal Democrat councillors for Portfield, Susan Darch and Lillian Jefferis, defected to the Conservatives. However the Liberal Democrats regained one of the seats in a by-election on 5 May 2005 after the resignation of Susan Darch from the council and at the same time picked up a seat in Jumpers ward, which had formerly been held by an independent councillor.

63 candidates stood in 2007 for the 24 seats on the council, with Conservative candidates for every seat. The Liberal Democrats had 19 candidates, with at least one in all 11 wards, while six independents stood for election. After 16 years without a seat on the council, Labour stood 11 candidates in 2007, one in each ward, and the UK Independence Party had three candidates.

Only one councillor stood down at the election, Kevin Dingley from North Highcliffe and Walkford ward.

== Election result ==
The Conservatives majority on the council was strengthened after they won 17 of the 24 seats on the council. This was at the expense of the Liberal Democrats who lost half of their seats on the council to fall to four councillors. Meanwhile, independents picked up two seats to have three councillors.

The Conservatives gained seats from the Liberal Democrats in Purewell and Stanpit, but they did lose a seat back in Portfield. In Jumpers ward, independent Fred Neale picked up a seat, while independent Julie Petrie also gained a seat, topping the poll in Grange ward. The second seat in Grange had Conservative Denise Jones and Liberal Democrat John Freeman both finish with 374 votes. The winner of this seat was chosen by drawing a name out of a hat and Conservative Denise Jones gained the seat from the Liberal Democrat after she was given one more vote, as her name was chosen.

Christchurch local election result 2007
Party	Seats	Gains	Losses	Net gain/loss	Seats %	Votes %	Votes	+/−
Conservative	17	3	1	+2	70.8	61.0	22,022	+5.7
Liberal Democrats	4	1	5	-4	16.7	25.7	9,278	-6.0
Independent	3	2	0	+2	12.5	6.1	2,220	-1.4
Labour	0	0	0	0	0.0	4.3	1,549	-0.8
UKIP	0	0	0	0	0.0	2.9	1,051	+2.5

== Ward results ==
Burton and Winkton (2 seats)
Party	Candidate	Votes	%	±%
Conservative	David Flagg	972		
Conservative	Colin Jamieson	944		
Liberal Democrats	Dexter Davies	424		
Liberal Democrats	John Blunden	371		
Labour	Michael Woods	95		
Turnout		2,806	44.7	+2.9
Conservative hold		Swing		
Conservative hold		Swing		

Grange (2 seats)
Party	Candidate	Votes	%	±%
Independent	Julie Petrie	412		
Conservative	Denise Jones	375		
Liberal Democrats	John Freeman	374		
Liberal Democrats	Ian Nichols	359		
Independent	Jason Perry	345		
Conservative	Trevor Watts	297		
Labour	Vera Hill	118		
Turnout		2,280	33.4	+6.7
Independent gain from Liberal Democrats		Swing		
Conservative gain from Liberal Democrats		Swing		

Highcliffe (2 seats)
Party	Candidate	Votes	%	±%
Conservative	Myra Mawbey	1,310		
Conservative	John Lofts	1,153		
Liberal Democrats	Gillian Pitt	391		
Labour	Carol Wilcox	168		
Turnout		3,022	54.0	+3.7
Conservative hold		Swing		
Conservative hold		Swing		

Jumpers (2 seats)
Party	Candidate	Votes	%	±%
Independent	Colin Bungey	597		
Independent	Frederick Neale	484		
Conservative	Tavis Fox	409		
Conservative	Lisle Smith	378		
Liberal Democrats	Jason Viney	352		
Liberal Democrats	Stephen Humphrey	292		
Labour	Robert Deeks	61		
Turnout		2,573	43.0	+4.1
Independent hold		Swing		
Independent gain from Liberal Democrats		Swing		

Mudeford and Friars Cliff (3 seats)
Party	Candidate	Votes	%	±%
Conservative	Josephine Spencer	1,638		
Conservative	Michael Duckworth	1,575		
Conservative	Eric Spreadbury	1,464		
Liberal Democrats	Christopher Legg	507		
Liberal Democrats	Jennifer Lodge	477		
Labour	James Brennan	290		
Turnout		5,951	49.9	+2.9
Conservative hold		Swing		
Conservative hold		Swing		
Conservative hold		Swing		

North Highcliffe and Walkford (2 seats)
Party	Candidate	Votes	%	±%
Conservative	Sally Derham Wilkes	1,117		
Conservative	Nicholas Geary	1,004		
Liberal Democrats	Debby Broomfield	415		
Labour	Simon Trim	179		
Turnout		2,715	51.3	+7.0
Conservative hold		Swing		
Conservative hold		Swing		

Portfield (2 seats)
Party	Candidate	Votes	%	±%
Liberal Democrats	David Davies	465		
Liberal Democrats	David Vick	457		
Conservative	Lillian Jefferis	397		
Conservative	Maurne Wilson	339		
Independent	Carol Flynn	212		
Independent	Linda Hammond	170		
Labour	Abdulhaye Qureshi	67		
Turnout		2,107	36.0	−0.5
Liberal Democrats gain from Conservative		Swing		
Liberal Democrats hold		Swing		

Purewell and Stanpit (2 seats)
Party	Candidate	Votes	%	±%
Conservative	Raymond Nottage	810		
Conservative	Lucy Filer	804		
Liberal Democrats	Christine Payne	715		
Liberal Democrats	Alan Wright	654		
Labour	Matthew Hepple	93		
Turnout		3,076	47.2	+6.6
Conservative gain from Liberal Democrats		Swing		
Conservative gain from Liberal Democrats		Swing		

St Catherine's and Hurn (2 seats)
Party	Candidate	Votes	%	±%
Conservative	Susan Spittle	957		
Conservative	David Fox	919		
Liberal Democrats	Maria Drummond	362		
Liberal Democrats	John Campbell	355		
UKIP	John Reid	306		
UKIP	David Williams	260		
Labour	James Bewley	100		
Turnout		3,259	55.5	+12.8
Conservative hold		Swing		
Conservative hold		Swing		

Town Centre (2 seats)
Party	Candidate	Votes	%	±%
Liberal Democrats	Peter Hall	956		
Liberal Democrats	Brett Bader	863		
Conservative	Malcolm Mawbey	513		
Conservative	John Newman	506		
Labour	George Gregory	93		
Turnout		2,931	46.6	+0.9
Liberal Democrats hold		Swing		
Liberal Democrats hold		Swing		

West Highcliffe (3 seats)
Party	Candidate	Votes	%	±%
Conservative	Alan Griffiths	1,428		
Conservative	Patricia Jamieson	1,426		
Conservative	David Jones	1,287		
Liberal Democrats	Martyn Hurll	489		
UKIP	Philip Glover	485		
Labour	Robert Maskell	285		
Turnout		5,400	46.1	+4.9
Conservative hold		Swing		
Conservative hold		Swing		
Conservative hold		Swing		

== By-elections between 2007 and 2011 ==
A by-election was held in Portfield on 16 July 2009 after the resignation of Liberal Democrat councillor David Vick due to poor health. The seat was held for the Liberal Democrats by Christine Payne with a one-vote majority over Conservative Lisle Smith.

Portfield by-election 16 July 2009
Party	Candidate	Votes	%	±%
Liberal Democrats	Christine Payne	279	34.4	−1.1
Conservative	Lisle Smith	278	34.3	+4.0
Independent	Christopher Neale	156	19.2	−9.9
UKIP	Kenneth Johnson	98	12.1	+12.1
Majority		1	0.1	
Turnout		811	25.4	−11.1
Liberal Democrats hold		Swing		
