= 2015 Christchurch Borough Council election =

2015 UK local government election

Map of the results of the 2015 Christchurch Borough Council election. Conservatives in blue, independents in grey and UK Independence Party in purple.

The 2015 Christchurch Borough Council election took place on 7 May 2015 to elect members of Christchurch Borough Council in Dorset, England. The whole council was up for election and the Conservative Party stayed in overall control of the council.

== Background ==
After the last election in 2011 the Conservatives had a majority on the council with 21 seats, while independents had two seats and there was one Liberal Democrat. However the only Liberal Democrat councillor, Peter Hall of Town Centre ward, defected to the Conservatives in June 2011.

69 candidates stood in 2015 for the 24 seats on the council, including a full slate of 24 from the Conservatives. Labour had 20 candidates and the UK Independence Party 16, up from 11 and 6 respectively in 2011. Other candidates were six from the Green Party and three independents, including the two sitting councillors in Jumpers ward, Colin Bungey and Fred Neale. After the Liberal Democrats stood 11 candidates in 2011 they had no candidates in 2015, with the party's candidate for the Christchurch parliamentary constituency saying that the local party "wanted to concentrate on the general election campaign".

Three Conservative councillors, Mike Duckworth, Gillian Geary and Myra Mawbey, stood down at the election. Meanwhile, the election in North Highcliffe and Walkford ward was delayed until June 2015 after the death of one of the candidates.

== Election result ==
The Conservatives remained in control of the council after winning 19 of the 22 seats contested in May. They lost one seat to the UK Independence Party, but retained all of the other seats they had been defending, including both seats in Town Centre ward where Peter Hall held his seat as a Conservative after his defection from the Liberal Democrats in 2011. The UK Independence Party gain came in Grange ward where Janet Abbott was elected and the party got an increased vote share across the council. Meanwhile, the only other seats not won by the Conservatives came in Jumpers where the two independent councillors, Colin Bungey and Fred Neale, held their seats.

The Conservatives also won both seats at the June delayed election in North Highcliffe and Walkford ward.

Christchurch local election result 2015
Party	Seats	Gains	Losses	Net gain/loss	Seats %	Votes %	Votes	+/−
Conservative	21	0	1	-1	87.5	57.7	28,859	-5.6
Independent	2	0	0	0	8.3	4.7	2,331	-2.4
UKIP	1	1	0	+1	4.2	20.5	10,242	+14.0
Labour	0	0	0	0	0.0	13.8	6,899	+4.6
Green	0	0	0	0	0.0	3.3	1,672	+3.3

The above totals include the delayed election in North Highcliffe and Walkford.

== Ward results ==
Burton and Wickton (2 seats)
Party	Candidate	Votes	%	±%
Conservative	David Flagg	1,190		
Conservative	Colin Jamieson	1,164		
UKIP	Dan Mills	564		
UKIP	Cindy McGrail	562		
Independent	Brian Taylor	335		
Labour	James Kennedy	300		
Labour	Jacqueline Milton	299		
Turnout		4,414	71.0	+20.5
Conservative hold		Swing		
Conservative hold		Swing		

Grange (2 seats)
Party	Candidate	Votes	%	±%
Conservative	Denise Jones	645		
UKIP	Janet Abbott	635		
Conservative	Paul Hilliard	584		
UKIP	Carl Williams	547		
Labour	Antoinette Pearce	377		
Labour	David Munnik	371		
Green	Graham Kendrick	225		
Turnout		3,384	55.1	+20.7
Conservative hold		Swing		
UKIP gain from Conservative		Swing		

Highcliffe (2 seats)
Party	Candidate	Votes	%	±%
Conservative	Vicki Hallam	1,283		
Conservative	John Lofts	1,221		
UKIP	Robin Ede	618		
UKIP	Jean Bell	541		
Labour	Carol Wilcox	250		
Labour	Vera Hill	242		
Turnout		4,155	74.8	+17.4
Conservative hold		Swing		
Conservative hold		Swing		

Jumpers (2 seats)
Party	Candidate	Votes	%	±%
Independent	Colin Bungey	1,014		
Independent	Fred Neale	982		
Conservative	Norma Fox	678		
Conservative	Will Edwards	652		
Labour	Robin Thorpe	270		
Green	Robert Staite	214		
Labour	Howard Wortley	211		
Green	Nigel Ware	174		
Turnout		4,195	70.5	+24.2
Independent hold		Swing		
Independent hold		Swing		

Mudeford and Friars Cliff (3 seats)
Party	Candidate	Votes	%	±%
Conservative	Claire Bath	1,900		
Conservative	Andy Barfield	1,897		
Conservative	Trevor Watts	1,437		
UKIP	Robert Clifford	945		
Labour	Lindsay Turner	558		
Labour	Robert Brannan	515		
Turnout		7,252	74.4	
Conservative hold		Swing		
Conservative hold		Swing		
Conservative hold		Swing		

Portfield (2 seats)
Party	Candidate	Votes	%	±%
Conservative	Tavis Fox	1,081		
Conservative	Lisle Smith	868		
UKIP	Jane Brown	676		
Labour	Julie Keeble	507		
Labour	Bob McNair	416		
Turnout		3,548	66.8	+27.4
Conservative hold		Swing		
Conservative hold		Swing		

Purewell and Stanpit (2 seats)
Party	Candidate	Votes	%	±%
Conservative	Bernie Davis	1,066		
Conservative	Ray Nottage	966		
UKIP	Diane Rollinson	657		
UKIP	Terry Spooner	561		
Labour	Clare Martens	432		
Green	Anthony Sanders	421		
Turnout		4,103	70.4	+22.2
Conservative hold		Swing		
Conservative hold		Swing		

St Catherine's and Hurn (2 seats)
Party	Candidate	Votes	%	±%
Conservative	Sue Spittle	1,603		
Conservative	Margaret Phipps	1,494		
UKIP	Inez Baxter	599		
Labour	Alan Matthews	308		
Labour	Valerie Matthews	298		
Turnout		4,302	76.5	+20.5
Conservative hold		Swing		
Conservative hold		Swing		

Town Centre (2 seats)
Party	Candidate	Votes	%	±%
Conservative	Peter Hall	1,045		
Conservative	Wendy Grace	993		
UKIP	Liz Faherty	585		
UKIP	Olga Turner	476		
Labour	George Gregory	365		
Green	Joanne Dyton	349		
Green	Steven Thomas	289		
Turnout		4,102	70.2	+21.0
Conservative hold		Swing		
Conservative hold		Swing		

West Highcliffe (3 seats)
Party	Candidate	Votes	%	±%
Conservative	Trish Jamieson	1,945		
Conservative	Lesley Dedman	1,834		
Conservative	David Jones	1,745		
UKIP	Philip Glover	922		
UKIP	Douglas Oakley	751		
Labour	Robert Maskell	534		
Labour	Abdul Qureshi	371		
Turnout		8,091	74.3	+21.3
Conservative hold		Swing		
Conservative hold		Swing		
Conservative hold		Swing		

=== North Highcliffe and Walkford delayed election ===
The election in North Highcliffe and Walkford ward took place on 18 June 2015, delayed from 7 May when the rest of the council voted, after the death of Labour candidate Richard Walls. The two seats were won by Conservatives Sally Derham Wilkes and Nick Geary.

North Highcliffe and Walkford (2 seats)
Party	Candidate	Votes	%	±%
Conservative	Sally Derham Wilkes	793		
Conservative	Nick Geary	775		
UKIP	Robin Grey	315		
UKIP	Janet Hatton	288		
Labour	Donald Barr	143		
Labour	Gareth Walls	132		
Turnout		2,446	41.0	−12.1
Conservative hold		Swing		
Conservative hold		Swing		

== Mudeford and Friars Cliff by-election ==
Mudeford and Friars Cliff by-election 2 March 2017
Party	Candidate	Votes	%	±%
Conservative	Paul Hilliard	629	46.8	−9.0
Independent	Sheila Gray	466	34.7	+34.7
Labour	Julian Spurr	91	6.8	−9.6
UKIP	Lawrence Wilson	85	6.3	−21.5
Green	Fiona Cownie	72	5.4	+5.4
Majority		163	12.1	
Turnout		1,343		
Conservative hold		Swing		
