= Winkton, Dorset =

Hamlet in Dorset, England

Coordinates: 50.7635°N 1.7710°W

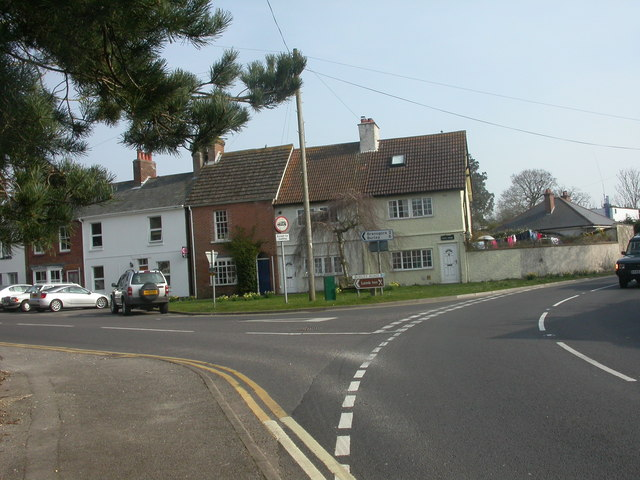
The tiny village green at Winkton

Winkton is a hamlet to the north of Christchurch in the Bournemouth, Christchurch and Poole district in the ceremonial county of Dorset, England. Together with the village of Burton, it is in the civil parish of Burton and Winkton.

Historically in Hampshire, Winkton is on the borders of the New Forest, and is adjacent to the River Avon. The town of Christchurch lies to the south. The former airfield RAF Winkton was constructed nearby.

== History ==
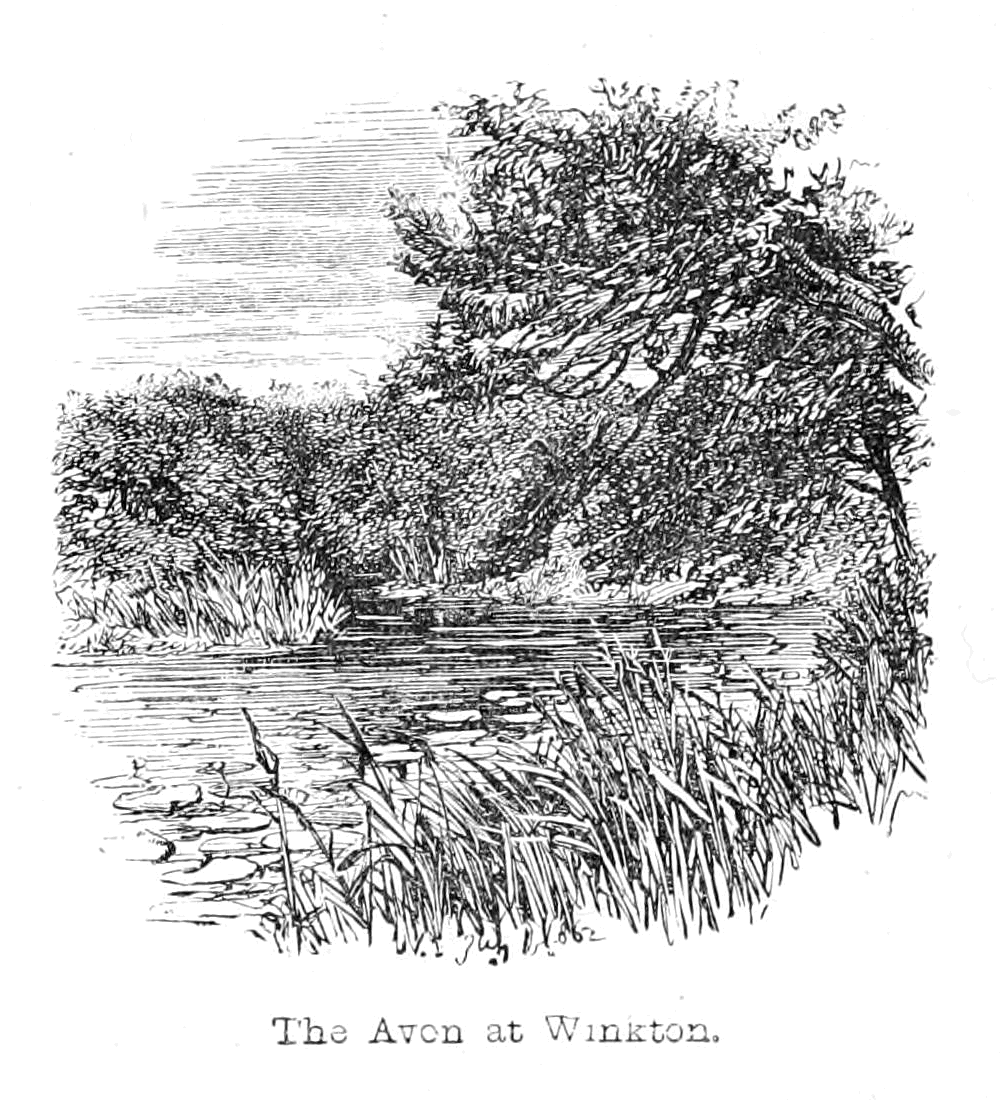
The Avon at Winkton (1867)

Winkton was listed in the Domesday Book under the name Weringetone. It was described as follows by John Wise in his The New Forest - Its History and its Scenery, published in 1867:

Leaving Sopley, we come to Winkton, the Weringetone of Domesday, where stood two mills, which were rented, as we have seen was often the case, by a payment of eels.

The views here are full of quiet beauty; the river winding along between its green walls of rushes, set with white and purple comfrey and yellow loosestrife, flowing into the darkness of the trees, and then again coming out by meadows, across which rises the Priory Church of Christchurch, standing out clear and sharp against the dark mass of Hengistbury Head.

== Politics ==
Winkton is part of the Christchurch parliamentary constituency for elections to the House of Commons. It has been represented since 1997 by Conservative MP Christopher Chope.
