= Burton, Dorset =

Village in Dorset, England

Coordinates: 50.7525°N 1.7651°W

Burton
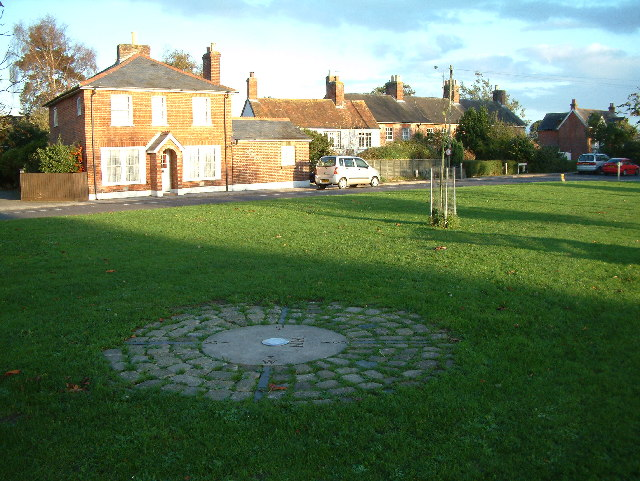
- Burton Green looking east towards Salisbury Road

- Location within Dorset
- OS grid reference: SZ1694
- Civil parish: Burton and Winkton
- Unitary authority: Bournemouth, Christchurch and Poole
- Ceremonial county: Dorset
- Region: South West
- Country: England
- Sovereign state: United Kingdom
- Post town: CHRISTCHURCH
- Postcode district: BH23
- Police: Dorset
- Fire: Dorset and Wiltshire
- Ambulance: South Western
- UK Parliament: Christchurch

Burton is a village in the civil parish of Burton and Winkton in the Bournemouth, Christchurch and Poole district of Dorset, England. The village is elevated above the Avon Valley on a gravel plateau. Much of the village was built in the 1970s, and today the population is around 4,000.

The toponymy of Burton suggests an Anglo-Saxon settlement but the first record of the name appears in twelfth-century records. It is thought that this is because it has always been viewed as an extension of Christchurch. There is evidence of human habitation there as far back as the Mesolithic, and the oldest existing parts date back to at least the early 18th century.

There are a number of listed buildings in the village including the parish church of St Luke, built in 1874-75 and designed by Benjamin Ferrey, and Burton Hall, a large 18th-century residence with grade II* status. Burton was home of the poet and writer Robert Southey between 1799 and 1805, and he wrote his well known fairytale, Goldilocks and the Three Bears, in the village.

== Geography ==
The village is situated approximately 1 1/4 miles (2.0 km) north-east of Christchurch town centre but less than 3/4 mile (1.2 km) from its urban extent.

Sitting on a gravel terrace above the Avon Valley flood plain, Burton village is a linear settlement along the historic route from Christchurch to Ringwood and Salisbury. To the west of the settlement lies the Avon Valley, designated a Special Protection Area (SPA), Ramsar and Site of Special Scientific Interest (SSSI). From there, the land slopes gently upwards in easterly direction where, beyond the village, it is used mainly for agricultural purposes. The area is drained by a small stream, known as the Clockhouse Stream, which meanders through the northern end of the village and across the flood plain, before joining the Avon near Christchurch town centre. The Avon Valley Path, a 34-mile trail from Christchurch to Salisbury, passes through the village.

== History ==
Burton is not recorded in the Domesday Book. The earliest mention of the name occurs in the twelfth century but it is likely that prior to this, official records included it as part of the lands of Twynham or Christchurch as it was later known. The village's name stems from the Anglo-Saxon, burh meaning fortified town and tun meaning farm. The name suggests the village was either a fortified farmstead or simply a farm belonging to the nearby Burgh of Christchurch.

There is archaeological evidence that Palaeolithic and Neolithic people occupied the lower part of the Avon Valley but the first evidence of permanent residence at Burton dates back to the Mesolithic. It is thought that the obstacle of the flood plain led to the development of an alternative route north on which fringe settlements like Burton and Winkton grew.

The oldest buildings in the village date back to at least the early 18th century but Burton was greatly expanded in the 1970s and 1980s and today there are more than 1700 dwellings and a population of nearly 4000. Winkton is the second largest settlement in the parish with a population of about 180. John Marius Wilson's Imperial Gazetteer of England and Wales, published 1870–1872, records the then population of Burton as 582.

== Demography ==
Age Distribution in the Parish of Burton
Years	Count	%
0-4	207	5.0
5-15	478	11.5
16-24	444	10.6
25-44	917	22.0
45-64	1264	30.2
65-84	755	18.1
85+	112	2.6

The 2011 census records the population of the parish as 4,177 of which 48.2% are male and 51.8% are female. 16.5% are children under 16 years-of-age, 29.3% are over 60, and the remaining 54.2% are in the 17 to 59 age bracket. The mean average age is 43.3 years. 96.6% identify as white British. Of the 69.1% of residents who claimed to have a religion, 97.97% said they were Christian.

The population density is 4.8 people per hectare. 71.7% of the population are economically active comprising 66.0% who are in employment, 3.1% who are students over the age of 16, and 2.6% who are unemployed. The remaining 28.3% are classified as economically inactive and incorporate the 17.7% who are retired, the 3.3% who are students over the age of 16, 3.5% who are carers, 2.6% who are long-term sick or disabled, and 1.1% who fall into another category. Burton has a considerably younger population than the rest of Christchurch.

Despite being a rural area, only 0.8% of residents work in agriculture. The largest employment sectors are ONS Industry Groups G and Q - Wholesale, Retail and Motor Vehicle Maintenance, which employs 16.9%, and Human Health and Social Work, which employs 16.1% of residents.

== Culture and community ==
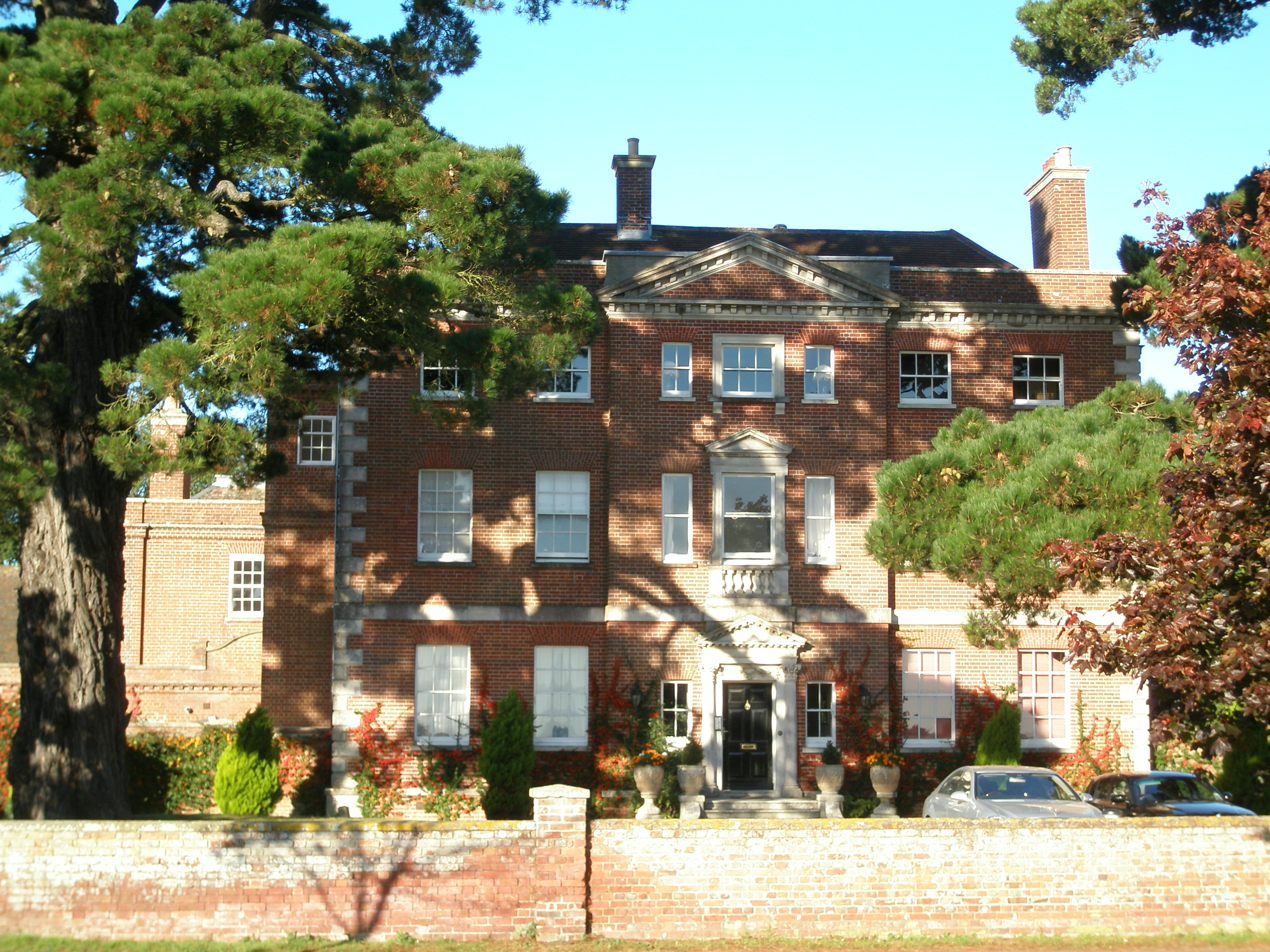
Burton Hall, a grade II* landmark built circa 1750

The village holds a number of annual events including an Armed Forces Day and an Easter egg hunt. Church services are also held on the green at Easter and Christmas including Christmas carols around the Christmas tree. The services are jointly hosted by the two local churches of St Lukes and Burton United Reformed, both situated on the green. Other local amenities include two general stores, one with a post office, four public houses, a doctors surgery and a youth centre.

There are a number of listed buildings in the village including the parish church of St Luke, built in 1874-75 and designed by Benjamin Ferrey. Constructed in the early-English style from red brick with stone dressings, the slate roof leads to a stone coped gable end with bellcote. Another locally recognised landmark is Burton Hall, a large 18th-century gentleman's residence with grade II* status. The property has since been divided into flats but the interior still retains its large staircase, moulded architrave, six-panelled doors and 18th-century fireplaces. Another listed building is Whitehayes House (also known in some archives as Sunnyhayes and Westhayes), just off Burton Green, where Admiral Edmund Lyons was born. The parish also contains a Scheduled Ancient Monument, Staple Cross. Very little is known about the truncated stone obelisk that stands at the southern extremity of the village but one suggestion is that it was a boundary marker between the tithings of Christchurch and Burton. Another source states that the 'cross' at Staple Cross, was knocked over by a Sherman tank during World War 2, hence the somewhat stunted remains. However, analysis of the engraving on page 288 of The New Forest: Its History and Its Scenery (John R. Wise - 1863) would suggest that this is little more than folklore.

Primary education is provided for within the village at Burton Church of England Primary School. Children must travel outside the parish for secondary schooling, usually The Grange in nearby Somerford. A mobile library visits the area fortnightly.

== Governance and politics ==
Burton is in the parish of Burton and Winkton, which covers an area of 868.9 hectares (2,147 acres) and includes the hamlets of Winkton, Bockhampton and Holfleet, and the surrounding countryside. On 31 March 2019 the parish was renamed from "Burton" to "Burton & Winkton".

Burton is part of the Burton and Grange ward for elections to Bournemouth, Christchurch and Poole Council.

Burton is part of the Christchurch parliamentary constituency for elections to the House of Commons of the United Kingdom, currently represented by Conservative MP Christopher Chope.

Historically, Burton was in Hampshire until 1974. From 1894 to 1974, it was part of Christchurch East civil parish, which was in Christchurch Rural District until 1932, when it was merged into Ringwood and Fordingbridge Rural District. From 1974 to 2019, Burton was in the Christchurch borough of the two-tier non-metropolitan county of Dorset, administered at the upper level by Dorset County Council.

== Notable residents ==
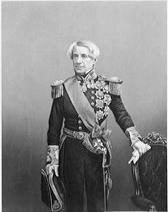
Edmund Lyons

- Edmund Lyons, 1st Baron Lyons (1790–1858) was a Royal Navy commander and diplomat who was born and lived in the parish of Burton, Christchurch.
- Robert Southey (1774–1843), writer, poet and later poet laureate; lived in Burton between 1799 and 1805. He wrote the fairytale, Goldilocks and the Three Bears at his home, Burton Cottage, which he had fashioned from two adjoining properties. Many other writers and poets of the day visited him there including his brother in law, Samuel Coleridge, and Sir Walter Scott.
- Daniel Gunn (1774-1848), was a Scottish congregational minister, with a congregation of a thousand in Christchurch from 1816 until his death. His Sunday school was attended by upwards of four hundred children. He lived like a country gentleman at Burton, and died there on 17 June 1848.
