= 2011 Christchurch Borough Council election =

2011 UK local government election

Map of the results of the 2011 Christchurch Borough Council election. Conservatives in blue, independents in grey and Liberal Democrats in yellow.

The 2011 Christchurch Borough Council election took place on 5 May 2011 to elect members of Christchurch Borough Council in Dorset, England. The whole council was up for election and the Conservative Party stayed in overall control of the council.

== Election result ==
The Conservatives increased their majority on the council after winning 21 of the 24 seats. They gained both of the seats in Portfield ward from the Liberal Democrats, with Conservatives Margaret Phipps and Lisle Smith being elected. A further gain came in Town Centre where Conservative Gillian Geary took one of the two seats for the ward, while Paul Hilliard was elected for the first time in Grange ward.

The Liberal Democrat defeats in Portfield and Town Centre wards reduced them to just one seat on the council, with Peter Hall in Town Centre ward being the party's only councillor. The only other non-Conservatives elected were independents Colin Bungey and Fred Neale who were re-elected in Jumpers ward. Overall turnout at the election was 48.7%.

Following the election Ray Nottage was chosen by the Conservative group as the new leader of the council.

Christchurch local election result 2011
Party	Seats	Gains	Losses	Net gain/loss	Seats %	Votes %	Votes	+/−
Conservative	21	4	0	+4	87.5	63.3	19,708	+2.3%
Independent	2	0	1	-1	8.3	7.1	2,219	+1.0%
Liberal Democrats	1	0	3	-3	4.2	13.8	4,310	-11.9%
Labour	0	0	0	0	0	9.2	2,860	+4.9%
UKIP	0	0	0	0	0	6.5	2,034	+3.6%

== Ward results ==
Burton and Winkton (2 seats)
Party	Candidate	Votes	%	±%
Conservative	David Flagg	903		
Conservative	Colin Jamieson	869		
Liberal Democrats	Nicholas Woodford	649		
Labour	John Merritt	301		
UKIP	John Dendy	243		
Turnout		2,965	50.5	+5.8
Conservative hold		Swing		
Conservative hold		Swing		

Grange (2 seats)
Party	Candidate	Votes	%	±%
Conservative	Denise Jones	606		
Conservative	Paul Hilliard	513		
Labour	Vera Hill	312		
Independent	Ellen Stammas	251		
Liberal Democrats	John Campbell	214		
Liberal Democrats	Renetta Vick	153		
Turnout		2,049	34.4	+1.0
Conservative hold		Swing		
Conservative gain from Independent		Swing		

Highcliffe (2 seats)
Party	Candidate	Votes	%	±%
Conservative	John Lofts	1,423		
Conservative	Myra Mawbey	1,413		
Labour	Andrew Satherley	254		
Labour	Carol Wilcox	245		
Turnout		3,335	57.4	+3.4
Conservative hold		Swing		
Conservative hold		Swing		

Jumpers (2 seats)
Party	Candidate	Votes	%	±%
Independent	Colin Bungey	798		
Independent	Frederick Neale	673		
Conservative	Paul Kinzett	490		
Conservative	Malcolm Mawbey	411		
Liberal Democrats	Martyn Hurll	233		
Labour	Abdulhaye Qureshi	135		
Turnout		2,740	46.3	+3.3
Independent hold		Swing		
Independent hold		Swing		

Mudeford and Friars Cliff (3 seats)
Party	Candidate	Votes	%	±%
Conservative	Claire Bath	unopposed		
Conservative	Mike Duckworth	unopposed		
Conservative	Trevor Watts	unopposed		
Conservative hold		Swing		
Conservative hold		Swing		
Conservative hold		Swing		

North Highcliffe and Walkford (2 seats)
Party	Candidate	Votes	%	±%
Conservative	Sally Derham Wilkes	1,136		
Conservative	Nicholas Geary	1,001		
Labour	Donald Barr	381		
Turnout		2,518	53.1	+1.8
Conservative hold		Swing		
Conservative hold		Swing		

Portfield (2 seats)
Party	Candidate	Votes	%	±%
Conservative	Lisle Smith	542		
Conservative	Margaret Phipps	515		
Liberal Democrats	David Davies	352		
Liberal Democrats	Brett Bader	295		
Independent	Thomas Lane	273		
Labour	Christopher Sleightholme	200		
Turnout		2,177	39.4	+3.4
Conservative gain from Liberal Democrats		Swing		
Conservative gain from Liberal Democrats		Swing		

Purewell and Stanpit (2 seats)
Party	Candidate	Votes	%	±%
Conservative	Raymond Nottage	920		
Conservative	Bernard Davis	849		
Liberal Democrats	Zoe Larrad	424		
Liberal Democrats	Derek Chaffey	416		
Independent	Barry Sherwin	224		
Labour	Philippa Lloyd	181		
Turnout		3,014	48.2	+1.0
Conservative hold		Swing		
Conservative hold		Swing		

St Catherine's and Hurn (2 seats)
Party	Candidate	Votes	%	±%
Conservative	Susan Spittle	1,175		
Conservative	Tavis Fox	1,083		
Liberal Democrats	Jennifer Lodge	282		
UKIP	Simon Boyd	270		
Labour	James Kennedy	228		
Turnout		3,038	56.0	+0.5
Conservative hold		Swing		
Conservative hold		Swing		

Town Centre (2 seats)
Party	Candidate	Votes	%	±%
Liberal Democrats	Peter Hall	751		
Conservative	Gillian Geary	675		
Conservative	Lucy Filer	594		
Liberal Democrats	Andrew Slaney	541		
UKIP	John Reid	240		
Labour	Michael Woods	194		
Turnout		2,995	49.2	+2.6
Liberal Democrats hold		Swing		
Conservative gain from Liberal Democrats		Swing		

West Highcliffe (3 seats)
Party	Candidate	Votes	%	±%
Conservative	Lesley Dedman	1,583		
Conservative	Patricia Jamieson	1,572		
Conservative	David Jones	1,435		
UKIP	Philip Glover	557		
Labour	Christopher Thompson	429		
UKIP	Carl Williams	399		
UKIP	David Williams	325		
Turnout		6,300	53.0	+6.9
Conservative hold		Swing		
Conservative hold		Swing		
Conservative hold		Swing		
