= 2003 Christchurch Borough Council election =

2003 UK local government election

Map of the results of the 2003 Christchurch Borough Council election. Conservatives in blue, Liberal Democrats in yellow and independents in grey.

The 2003 Christchurch Borough Council election took place on 1 May 2003 to elect members of Christchurch Borough Council in Dorset, England. The whole council was up for election after boundary changes reduced the number of seats by one. The Conservative Party stayed in overall control of the council.

== Election result ==
The Conservatives remained in control of the council after winning 14 of the 24 seats on the council, despite losing three seats. The Liberal Democrats gained three seats to have eight councillors, while two independents were elected.

Christchurch local election result 2003
Party	Seats	Gains	Losses	Net gain/loss	Seats %	Votes %	Votes	+/−
Conservative	14			-3	58.3	55.3	17,350	
Liberal Democrats	8			+3	33.3	31.7	9,945	
Independent	2			-1	8.3	7.5	2,369	
Labour	0			0	0	5.1	1,608	
UKIP	0			0	0	0.4	129	

== Ward results ==
Burton and Winkton (2 seats)
Party	Candidate	Votes	%	±%
Conservative	David Flagg	721		
Conservative	Colin Jamieson	721		
Liberal Democrats	Derek Evans	587		
Liberal Democrats	David Phillpot	420		
Labour	Martin Jacques	127		
Turnout		2,576	41.8	

Grange (2 seats)
Party	Candidate	Votes	%	±%
Liberal Democrats	John Campbell	460		
Liberal Democrats	John Freeman	436		
Conservative	Denise Jones	248		
Conservative	Denise Flagg	245		
Labour	Christopher Thompson	198		
Labour	Carol Wilcox	189		
Turnout		1,776	26.7	

Highcliffe (2 seats)
Party	Candidate	Votes	%	±%
Conservative	Malcolm Mawbey	854		
Conservative	John Lofts	719		
Independent	Linda Hammond	580		
Liberal Democrats	William Hall	325		
Liberal Democrats	John Lanz	238		
Labour	Robert Maskell	131		
Turnout		2,847	50.3	

Jumpers (2 seats)
Party	Candidate	Votes	%	±%
Independent	Colin Bungey	569		
Independent	Robert McArthur	502		
Conservative	Trevor Watts	332		
Conservative	Shaun Flynn	321		
Liberal Democrats	Sandra Gola	268		
Liberal Democrats	John Jenkinson	252		
Independent	William Welsh	59		
Turnout		2,303	38.9	

Mudeford and Friars Cliff (3 seats)
Party	Candidate	Votes	%	±%
Conservative	Josephine Spencer	1,495		
Conservative	Michael Duckworth	1,426		
Conservative	Eric Spreadbury	1,340		
Liberal Democrats	Derrick Roberts	598		
Labour	Jennifer Carlton	381		
Turnout		5,240	47.0	

North Highcliffe and Walkford (2 seats)
Party	Candidate	Votes	%	±%
Conservative	Sally Derham Wilkes	651		
Conservative	Kevin Dingley	627		
Liberal Democrats	Robert Critchley	503		
Liberal Democrats	Alan Wright	470		
UKIP	Janet Hatton	129		
Labour	Abdulhaye Qureshi	65		
Turnout		2,445	44.3	

Portfield (2 seats)
Party	Candidate	Votes	%	±%
Liberal Democrats	Susan Darch	501		
Liberal Democrats	Lillian Jefferis	482		
Independent	Susan Bungey	328		
Conservative	Bernice Pardy	289		
Conservative	Desmond Pardy	272		
Labour	Jerry Brenton	106		
Labour	Vera Hill	77		
Turnout		2,055	36.5	

Purewell and Stanpit (2 seats)
Party	Candidate	Votes	%	±%
Liberal Democrats	Christine Payne	702		
Liberal Democrats	Wendy Lloyd	689		
Conservative	John Newman	575		
Conservative	Mark Agg-Jones	562		
Turnout		2,528	40.6	

St Catherine's and Hurn (2 seats)
Party	Candidate	Votes	%	±%
Conservative	David Fox	720		
Conservative	Susan Spittle	691		
Liberal Democrats	Jason Viney	577		
Turnout		1,988	42.7	

Town Centre (2 seats)
Party	Candidate	Votes	%	±%
Liberal Democrats	Peter Hall	766		
Liberal Democrats	Christopher Legg	699		
Conservative	Nicholas Geary	447		
Conservative	Michael Hodges	405		
Independent	John Lovell	331		
Turnout		2,648	45.7	

West Highcliffe (3 seats)
Party	Candidate	Votes	%	±%
Conservative	Alan Griffiths	1,247		
Conservative	Patricia Jamieson	1,238		
Conservative	David Jones	1,204		
Liberal Democrats	Caroline Curran	496		
Liberal Democrats	Paul Curran	476		
Labour	Raymond Manning	334		
Turnout		4,995	41.2	

== By-elections between 2003 and 2007 ==
=== Jumpers ===
A by-election was held in Jumpers ward on 5 May 2005 after the resignation of independent councillor Bob McArthur. The seat was gained for the Liberal Democrats by Jason Viney with a majority of 333 votes over Conservative Trevor Watts.

Jumpers by-election 5 May 2005
Party	Candidate	Votes	%	±%
Liberal Democrats	Jason Viney	1,224	57.9	+35.0
Conservative	Trevor Watts	891	42.1	+13.7
Majority		333	15.7	
Turnout		2,115	70.8	+31.9
Liberal Democrats gain from Independent		Swing		

=== Portfield ===
A by-election was held in Portfield on 5 May 2005 following the resignation of councillor Susan Darch due to poor health. Darch had been elected as a Liberal Democrat in 2003, but together with her fellow councillor for Portfied Lillian Jefferis, she subsequently defected to the Conservatives. The seat was regained for the Liberal Democrats by David Vick with a majority of 222 votes over Conservative Tavis Fox.

Portfield by-election 5 May 2005
Party	Candidate	Votes	%	±%
Liberal Democrats	David Vick	1,023	56.1	+15.1
Conservative	Tavis Fox	801	43.9	+20.4
Majority		222	12.2	
Turnout		1,824	64.6	
Liberal Democrats gain from Conservative		Swing		

=== Purewell and Stanpit ===
A by-election was held in Purewell and Stanpit on 5 May 2005 after the death of Liberal Democrat councillor Wendy Lloyd. The seat was held for the Liberal Democrats by Alan Wright with a majority of 34 votes over Conservative Nicholas Geary.

Purewell and Stanpit by-election 5 May 2005
Party	Candidate	Votes	%	±%
Liberal Democrats	Alan Wright	1,067	50.8	−4.2
Conservative	Nicholas Geary	1,033	49.2	+4.2
Majority		34	1.6	
Turnout		2,100	67.8	
Liberal Democrats hold		Swing		
