= Christchurch Borough Council =

- Coat of arms of Christchurch Borough Council

Type
- Type: Unitary authority

History
- Founded: 1 April 1974
- Disbanded: 1 April 2019
- Succeeded by: Bournemouth, Christchurch and Poole Council; Christchurch Town Council

Leadership
- Mayor: Lesley Dedman, Conservative since 2018
- Leader: David Flagg, Conservative since 20 Feb 2017 until 31 Mar 2019
- Chief Executive: David McIntosh since 2011

Structure
- Seats: 24
- Political groups: Administration (21) Conservative (21) Other parties (3) Independent (2) UKIP (1)
- Joint committees: Joint Audit Committee, Stour Valley and Poole Partnership Joint Committee, Bournemouth, Christchurch and Poole Joint Committee, Red House Museum Joint Management Committee
- Length of term: 4 years

Elections
- Voting system: Multiple member first-past-the-post
- Last election: 7 May 2015

Meeting place
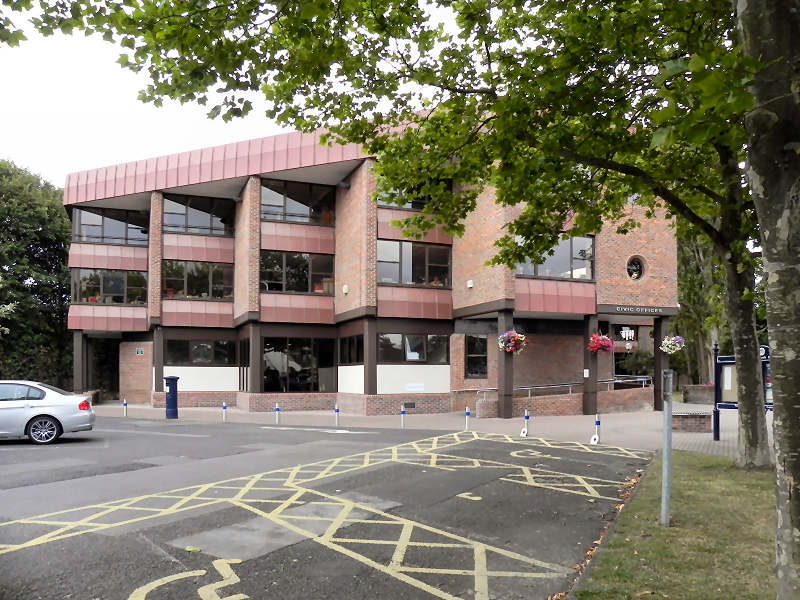
- Christchurch Civic Centre, Bridge St, Christchurch, BH23 1AZ

Website
- dorsetforyou.gov.uk (archived)

Christchurch Borough Council was a non-metropolitan district council for the district of Christchurch, in the county of Dorset, England.

The council was established in 1974 and was abolished in 2019 when it became part of Bournemouth, Christchurch and Poole Council. The council was based at the Civic Offices in Christchurch.

The area covered by the pre 1974 municipal borough was unparished, the rest of the district was covered by the parish councils of Burton Parish Council and Hurn Parish Council. When the district was abolished the unparished area was parished with Christchurch Town Council and Highcliffe and Walkford Neighbourhood Council formed.

== History ==
The council was formed on 1 April 1974 from the Municipal Borough of Christchurch, the parish of Hurn and part of Christchurch East and Sopley from Ringwood and Fordingbridge Rural District Council, all previously in Hampshire.

In June 2010, Christchurch Borough Council and East Dorset District Council agreed to share a chief executive in an effort to save £400,000, which was to be chosen from either of the two current serving chief executives; Michael Turvey (Christchurch) and David McIntosh (East Dorset). David McIntosh became the council's chief executive at the start of 2011.

The council was abolished on 1 April 2019 and merged with Bournemouth Borough Council and Poole Borough Council to form "Bournemouth, Christchurch and Poole Council". The council opposed to the merger but was refused permission to appeal against it.

== Governance ==
=== Political control ===
The first elections to the council were held in 1973, initially operating as a shadow authority prior to the district coming into effect the following year. From 1973 until its abolition in 2019 political control of the council was held by the following parties:

| Party in control | Years |
|---|---|
| Conservative | 1973–1995 |
| No overall control | 1995–1999 |
| Conservative | 1999–2019 |

=== Leadership ===
Political leadership is provided by the leader of the council, while the role of the Mayor of Christchurch is largely ceremonial. The leaders since 2003 until the council's abolition in 2019 were:

| Councillor | Party | From | To |
|---|---|---|---|
| Harold Cooper | Conservative | | 14 Feb 2003 |
| Alan Griffiths | Conservative | 2003 | 2010 |
| John Lofts | Conservative | Dec 2010 | May 2011 |
| Ray Nottage | Conservative | 17 May 2011 | 20 Feb 2017 |
| David Flagg | Conservative | 20 Feb 2017 | 31 Mar 2019 |

=== Composition ===
Following the 2015 election, and subsequent by-elections and changes of allegiance up to August 2026, the final composition of the council was:

| Party | Seats |
|---|---|
| Conservative | 21 |
| Independent | 2 |
| UKIP | 1 |
| Total | 24 |

== Elections ==
Summary of the council composition after each election; click on the year for full details of each election. Boundary changes took place for the 2003 election, reducing the number of seats by one.
