= Ailsa Dixon =

English composer and music teacher

Ailsa Mary Pauline Dixon (born Ailsa Harrison, 15 August 1932 – 8 August, 2017) was an English composer, teacher, singer and lutenist.

== Career ==
Born in Bristol, Dixon grew up in Little Missenden, Buckinghamshire, where her mother Pat Harrison (who had studied music with Edward Bairstow) founded the music festival in 1960. A distant ancestor was the Polish-Lithuanian violinist and composer Felix Yaniewicz, who co-founded the first Edinburgh Festival. Ailsa studied music at Durham University in the 1950s under Arthur Hutchings, and later studied privately with Paul Patterson, Professor of Composition at the Royal Academy of Music. She also studied lute with Diana Poulton. A student composition for string quartet was awarded the Eve Myra Kisch Prize at Durham.

After graduating Dixon taught singing and music appreciation, while also singing and playing lute in recitals with her guitarist husband Brian Dixon. In 1976 she directed a production of Handel’s opera Theodora, and this inspired her to compose an opera of her own. Letter to Philemon was staged at Aston Rowant Church in 1984. She was most active as a composer in the 1980s and 1990s. Notable performances included the premiere of the Nocturnal Scherzo at the Little Missenden Festival in 1986 by the Brindisi Quartet. Shining Cold a piece for wordless soprano, viola, cello and Ondes Martenot, was also performed there. Sohrab and Rustum (1987-88, inspired by Matthew Arnold's narrative poem) received its first performance in 1992 by the De Beauvoir Quartet.

In July 2017, the anthem These Things Shall Be, was premiered by the London Oriana Choir at the Cutty Sark in London, just a few weeks before her death, beginning a revival of interest in her music. It was heard again posthumously at the Little Missenden Festival in 2018, performed by Sansara, and has since been performed by several other choirs. Her Sonata for piano duet Airs of the Seasons was also premiered in 2018 by Waka Hasegawa and Joseph Tong at St George's Church in Bristol, where The Spirit of Love, three songs for soprano and string quartet composed in the late 1980s, received its first performance in 2020. Variations on Love Divine (composed 1991-1992, in 19 short movements), was given its first complete concert performance by the Villiers Quartet in 2022 at Wilton Church. The premiere of her anthem Lord, who shall dwell under your protection was given at St Peter's College Oxford on 10 May 2026.

A recording of her chamber music was issued by Resonus Classics in 2025.

== Personal life ==
Ailsa and Brian Dixon lived for 25 years in a house they built themselves in the village of Kingston Stert, Oxfordshire. There were three children, including a daughter, Josie (who has subsequently been promoting her mother's music). In the 1980s they moved to Southbourne near Chichester, where many of her compositions were completed. They later moved to Tytherleigh near Axminster and then (in 2005) to Overton in Hampshire. Dixon died at the age of 84 in Winchester.

== List of works ==
Chamber and instrumental

- Airs of the Seasons — sonata in four movements for piano duet, four hands, fp. 2018
- Nocturnal Scherzo for string quartet, fp. Brindisi Quartet, 1986
- Scherzo for string quartet (1955) - known as The 'lost' Scherzo, fp. Villiers Quartet 2026
- Shining Cold — vocalise for high soprano, ondes martenot, viola and cello, fp. Sally Harrison, Cynthia Millar and members of the Brindisi Quartet, 1986
- Sohrab and Rustum, fp. De Beauvoir Quartet, 1992
- Three Fugues on Biblical Subjects fp Lynda Sayce, Matthew Spring, Jacob Heringman and Xavier Diaz Latorre, 2024
- Variations on Love Divine, fp. the Rasumovsky Quartet, 1996

Choral

- 'I will lift up mine eyes', anthem for high soprano and piano or organ. Also version for piano and violin.
- Lord, who shall dwell under your protection, anthem for a capella choir, fp. 2026
- These things shall be, anthem for a capella choir, 1980s, fp. 2017

'Song

- Fire and Water, duets for soprano, alto and piano, from an unfinished cycle, The Elements
- Song of the Mad Prince for tenor or soprano and piano
- Songs of Faith and Joy, song cycle for soprano and guitar, fp. Chichester, 1988
- Songs to Medieval Latin Lyrics for soprano or tenor and piano
- The Spirit of Love, three songs for soprano and string quartet, fp. Lucy Cox and the Villiers Quartet, 2020
- Three Songs for Baritone
- Two Shakespeare Sonnets, fp. Ian Partridge and Lynne Dawson, Little Missenden Festival, 1989
- Two Shakespearean Songs inc. 'Come Away Death' fp. Thame, c. 1980
- Two Songs of Contentment inc. 'February' fp. 2024
- Two Songs for Sarah, for soprano or tenor and piano
- Three Songs for Baritone
- The Kingdom of Heaven for tenor, soprano and piano, fp. 1989

Opera

- Letter to Philemon, two-act chamber opera, fp. 1984
- The Tailor of Gloucester, mini-opera for children, fp. Lord Williams’ School Thame, 1984
