= Little Missenden =

Village in Buckinghamshire, England

Coordinates: 51.682°N 0.668°W

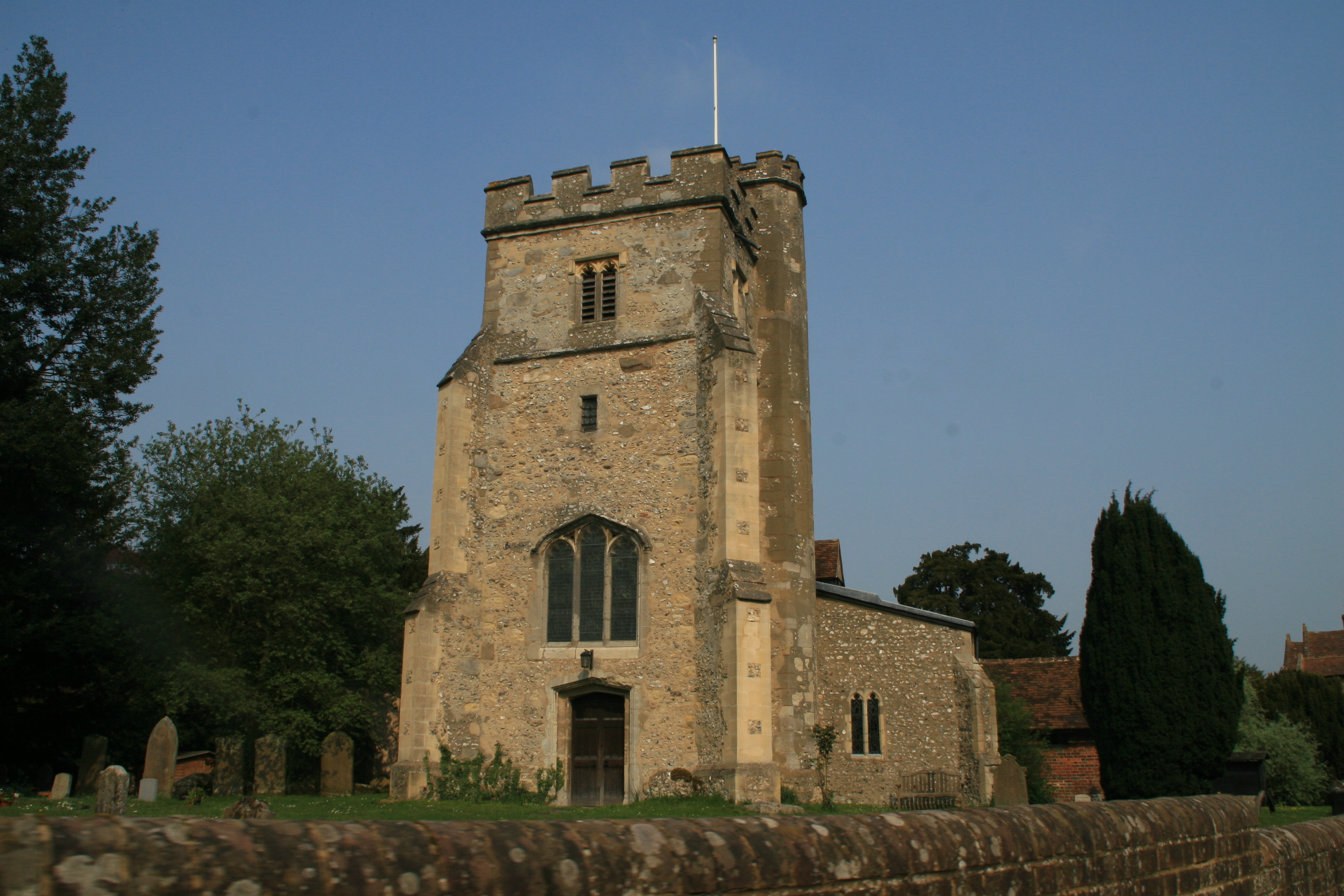
- Parish church of St John the Baptist

- Location within Buckinghamshire
- Population: 2,234 (2011 Census)
- OS grid reference: SU9298
- Civil parish: Little Missenden
- Unitary authority: Buckinghamshire
- Ceremonial county: Buckinghamshire
- Region: South East
- Country: England
- Sovereign state: United Kingdom
- Post town: Amersham
- Postcode district: HP7
- Dialling code: 01494
- Police: Thames Valley
- Fire: Buckinghamshire
- Ambulance: South Central
- UK Parliament: Mid Buckinghamshire

Little Missenden is a village and civil parish on the River Misbourne in Buckinghamshire, England. It is in the Chiltern Hills, about 3 miles (5 km) southeast of Great Missenden and 3 miles (5 km) west of Amersham. The village lies on the River Misbourne in the Misbourne valley.

The parish includes the villages of Holmer Green, Hyde Heath and Little Kingshill, and the hamlets of Beamond End, Brays Green, Mop End and Spurlands End. The 2011 Census recorded the population of the ward of Little Missenden, which includes Hyde Heath and Little Kingshill, as 2,234, albeit those other two villages in the ward are each larger than Little Missenden itself. The population of the entire parish was estimated as 6,490 in 2017, reflecting the inclusion of the much larger Holmer Green within the parish.

The main London – Aylesbury road used to run through the centre of Little Missenden and past the two pubs – The Red Lion and The Crown. Early in the 19th century a new by-pass road was built to the north and this now forms part of the modern A413 road.

== Etymology ==
The name Missenden is first attested in the Domesday Book as Missedene, with other early attestations including the spellings Messedena and Musindone. The -den element probably comes from Old English denu, meaning "valley", but the etymology of the first element is uncertain. It is thought to occur in the name of the River Misbourne, which rises in Great Missenden, and also in the Hertfordshire place-name Miswell. Frank Stenton and Allen Mawer guessed that it came from a hypothetical Anglo-Saxon personal name Myrsa, which they also supposed to be found in the name of Mursley.

Eilert Ekwall suggested that the name Missenden came from a lost Old English word related to English moss, and to Danish mysse and Swedish missne (which denote plants of the genus Calla, such as water arum). Recent researchers have tentatively preferred Ekwall's guess, in which case the name Missenden would once have meant something like "valley where water-plants/marsh-plants grow".

== Manors ==
The Domesday Book of 1086 records Missedene without distinguishing the two villages, but three manors of Little Missenden are identifiable as having existed by the reign of King Edward the Confessor (1042–66). William the Conqueror granted one hide of land around what is now Town Farm to his half-brother Robert, Count of Mortain. After Domesday it evolved as the manor of Holmer, whence the hamlet of Holmer Green arose.

The manor of Mantle was half a hide and was held by the Mantle family.. Another half-hide in Little Missenden had been held by Wulfwig, Bishop of Dorchester, but by 1086 was held by Hugh de Bolebec.

By the early 14th century a fourth manor, Beamond, had emerged, probably from part of the Mortains' manor. It was held by the Augustinian Bicester priory until 1536, when it surrendered its estates to the Crown in the Dissolution of the Monasteries. Its name survives in Beamond End.

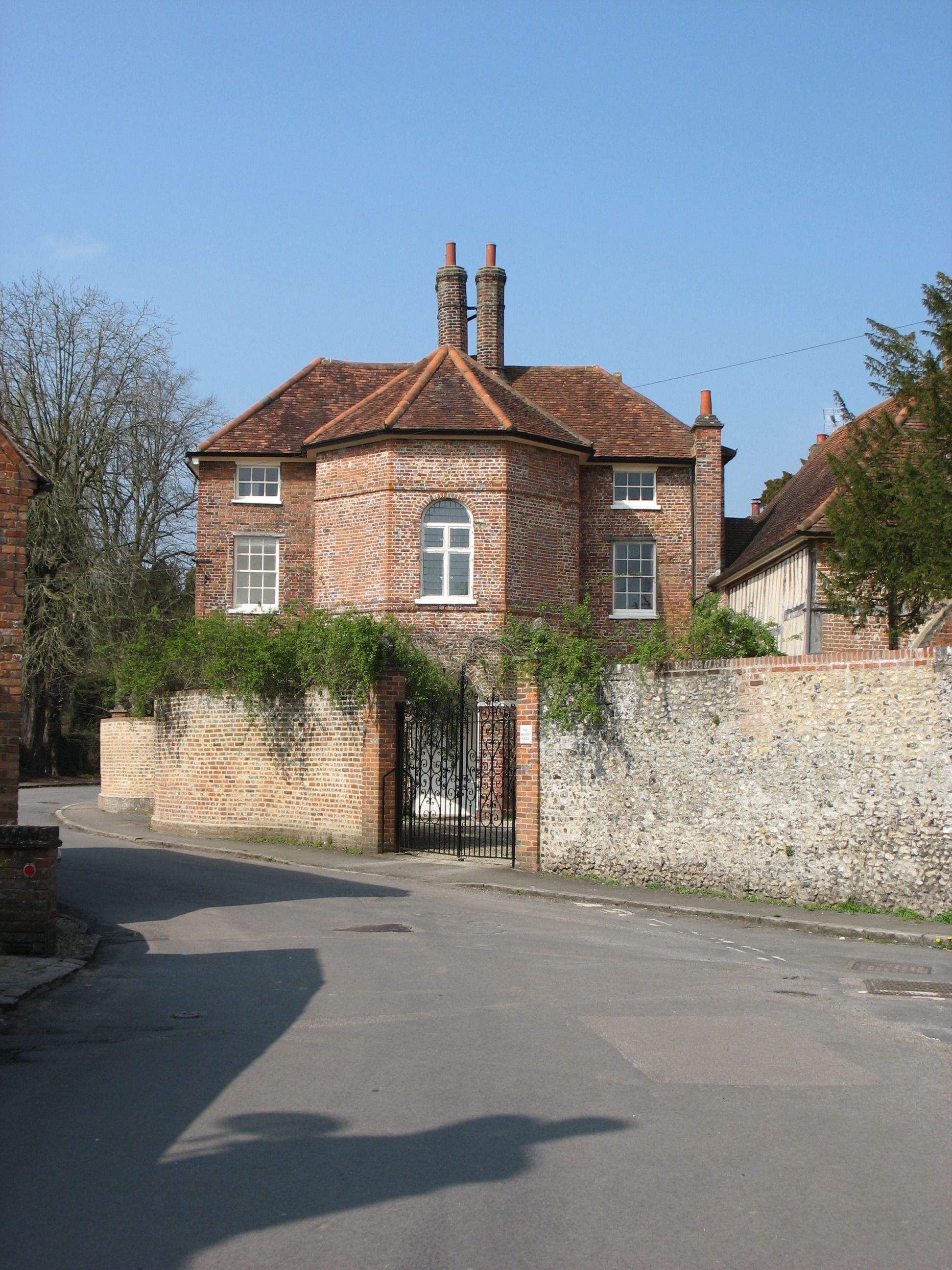
Little Missenden Manor house

The current Little Missenden Manor house originated in the 16th century as a late medieval timber-framed hall house. In the 17th century it was extended in red brick, and retains gables and a staircase from that period. The house was refaced in the 18th century. The Manor House has been Grade II listed since 1958 as a "timber framed 2 storey C16 with modern cement infill".

Missenden House, a red and grey brick building, has been Grade II listed since 1958 as Missenden House, Trout Hollow and East Wing. The listing indicates that it was completed in 1729, with an east wing added in the 19th century.

Little Missenden Abbey is a Tudor Revival mansion, Grade II listed since 1987, as a "country house on the site of a medieval Augustinian Abbey ... founded in 1133". The listing indicates that the abbey was modified into a mansion ca.1600, when it was owned by the Fleetwood family. Additional modifications were made when subsequent owners acquired the property in 1787 (James Oldham) and in 1815 (John Ayton). In the 21st century, the mansion was being used as a conference and training facility, and as a wedding venue, after an extensive renovation completed in 1988, necessitated by a fire that occurred in 1985.

A history of the community, published in 1908, offers this description of it in that era:

The village consists of a few small houses of the 18th century, of brick and rough-cast, and some cottages. Of late a number of week-end cottages have been erected in the parish. The manor house has some remains of 17th-century work, but was modernized in the early part of the 19th century and later. The house called 'Little Missenden Abbey,' the residence of Mr. E. Callard, possibly incorporates the remains of an old house.

== Parish church ==
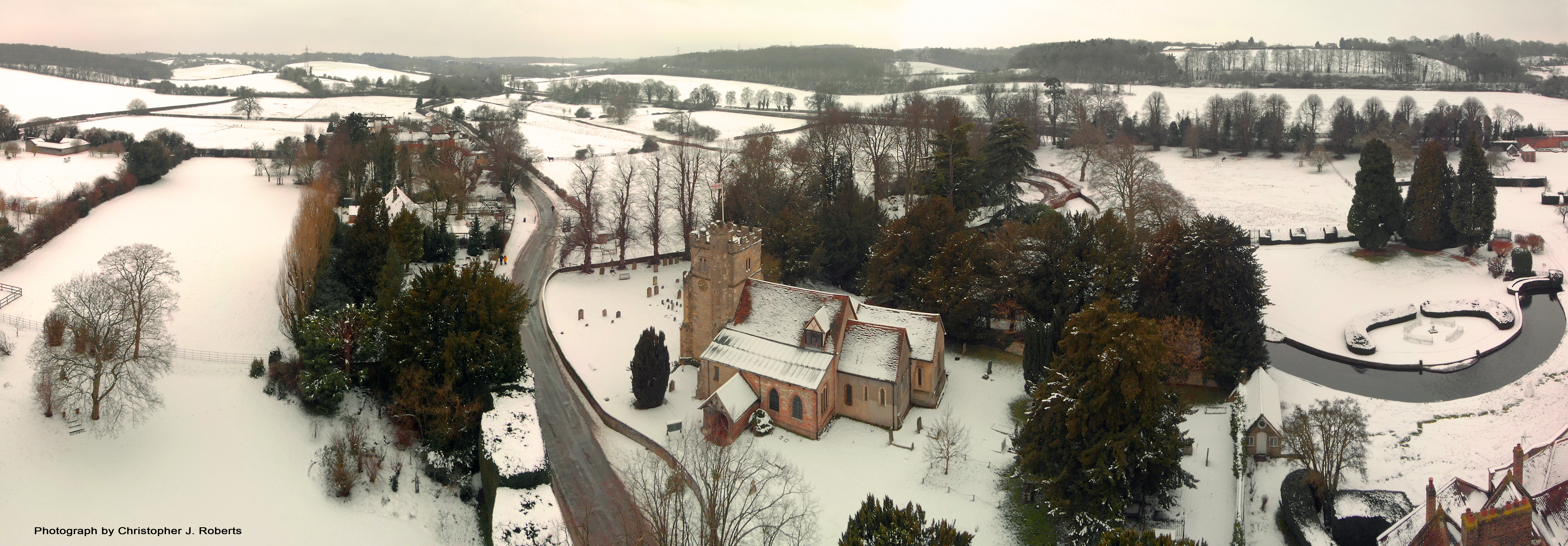
St. John the Baptist Church, Little Missenden

The Church of England parish church of St John the Baptist is a flint building with limestone dressings. It has been Grade I listed since 1958. The listing includes this information:

C10 or C11 Anglo-Saxon core, C12 arcades, early English chancel, early C14 north chapel, C15 timber framed porch and west tower. Exterior of south aisle brick, C18. Flint with limestone dressings, some roughcast. Old tile roofs, aisles lead roofed. Modern vestry to north in C18 style, roughcast, hipped tiled roof ...

Other sources provide more specifics. The nave is 10th-century Saxon, built about AD 975. Its plain chancel arch is also Saxon and its imposts are re-used Roman bricks. The aisles, with their Norman arcades, were added in the 12th century: the south first, and the north slightly later. The Aylesbury-style font is also 12th century.

The chancel is now Early English, having been rebuilt in the 13th century. The north chapel was added early in the 14th century. The west tower and timber-framed south porch are 15th-century.

The exterior of the south aisle was rebuilt in brick in the 18th century. On the north side of the church is a modern vestry designed in 18th-century style by Quinlan Terry. The church is a Grade I listed building.

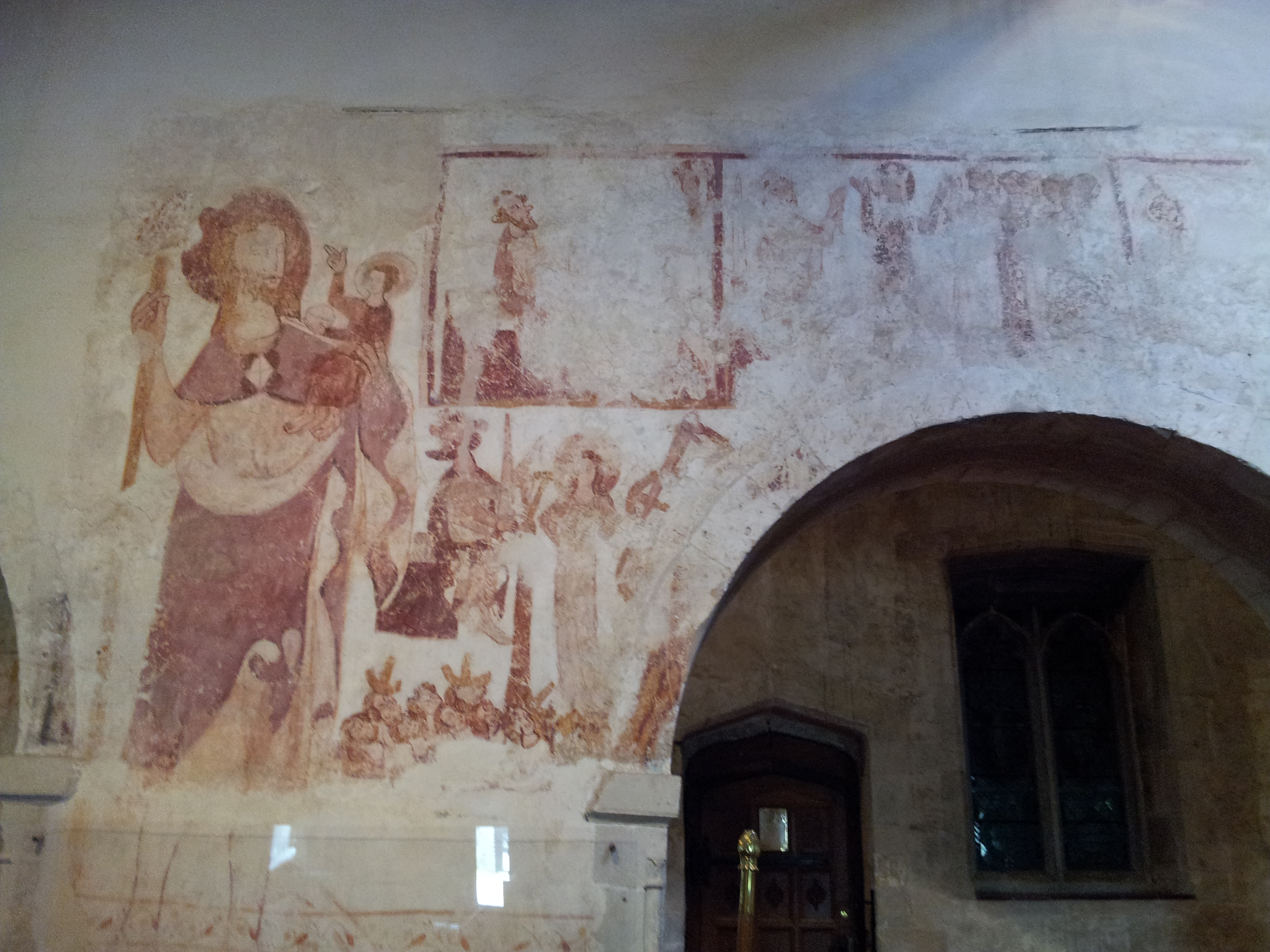
Paintings on the north wall of the nave, with St Christopher on the left

Inside the nave are several Mediæval wall paintings. Most are 13th-century, including a large Saint Christopher in the customary position opposite the south door. Also 13th-century are the paintings of the Martyrdom of St Catherine, Passion of Christ, Crucifixion of Christ, and Archangel Gabriel. There are also 14th-century paintings of the Nativity of Christ and Christ in Majesty, and a 15th-century painting of the Seven deadly sins.

The wall paintings were whitewashed in the 16th century in the English Reformation. In 1931 they were rediscovered and Prof. EW Tristram was called in to uncover and restore them. One painting eluded Tristram: A Doom painting in the customary position over the chancel arch at the east end of the nave. In 2017 traces of a 14th-century Doom were finally discovered, over the chancel arch, hidden behind old plaster.

The west tower has a ring of six bells. John Rufford of Toddington, Bedfordshire cast the third bell in about 1380. The successor of John Danyell of London cast the fourth bell in about 1470. Joseph Carter of Reading, Berkshire cast the fifth bell in 1603. Ellis II and Henry III Knight of Reading cast the tenor bell in 1663. John Warner & Sons of Cripplegate, London cast the second bell in 1881. That made a ring of five until 1948, when Mears and Stainbank of the Whitechapel Bell Foundry cast the present treble bell.

== Culture ==
The village has been used in many films and television programmes over the years, particularly as one of the more frequent ITV Midsomer Murders filming locations. "Missenden Murders" was considered as a possible title for the series. The Red Lion pub has appeared in three episodes. A house in the village was used for long shots of the home of Barnes Wallis in The Dam Busters (his real house was in Effingham, Surrey). Little Missenden became the village of Blandley in the 1963 film Nurse on Wheels by Gerald Thomas and Peter Rodgers.

Little Missenden hosts comedy and arts festivals. The children of Little Missenden primary school performed the premiere of John Tavener's Celtic Requiem in 1970 and continue to perform annually at the Little Missenden Festival of Music and Arts. Tavener wrote Little Missenden Calm for the festival in 1984.

== Transport ==
The nearest railway station is at Great Missenden on the London–Aylesbury line.

== Notable residents ==
- Herbert Austin (1866–1941), motor vehicle manufacturer, was born in Little Missenden to a farming family. He moved to Rotherham, West Riding at an early age.
- Dr Benjamin Bates II (1716–90), physician to Sir Francis Dashwood and a senior member of the Hellfire Club.
- Charles Orwell Brasch (1909–73) New Zealand poet, literary editor, arts patron, founding editor of the literary journal Landfall.
- Pat Harrison (1905-1998), founder of the Little Missenden Festival, lived at Missenden House and later at Dering Cottage. Her daughter was composer Ailsa Dixon (1932-2017), whose music has been performed at the Festival.
- Tony Nash (1936–2022) Olympic bobsledder, lived at Little Missenden when he was director of an engineering company in Penn.
- Wilf Stevenson, Baron Stevenson of Balmacara (born 1947) Life peer and former policy advisor to Gordon Brown.
- Rayner Unwin (1925–2000), publisher
- John Gardner Wilkinson (1797–1875), traveller, writer and pioneer Egyptologist

== Bibliography ==
- Jones, Evan Mark G (2000). Film and TV Locations in Thames and Chilterns Country. Film & TV Tours. p. 59.
- Page, WH, ed. (1908). "Little Missenden". A History of the County of Buckingham. Victoria County History. Vol. II. London: Archibald Constable & Co. pp. 354–360.
- Pevsner, Nikolaus (1960). Buckinghamshire. The Buildings of England. Harmondsworth: Penguin Books. pp. 192–3. ISBN 0-14-071019-1.
- Rouse, EC (1932). "Little Missenden Church – Structural Features" (PDF). Records of Buckinghamshire. 12 (6). Buckinghamshire Archaeological Society: 315–23.
- Rouse, EC (1933). "Little Missenden" (PDF). Records of Buckinghamshire. 12 (7). Buckinghamshire Archaeological Society: 403–4.
- RCHME, ed. (1981). "68. Little Missenden". An Inventory of the Historical Monuments in the County of Buckinghamshire. Vol. 1, South. London: Her Majesty's Stationery Office. pp. 232–235.
- Stebbing-Allen, George (2018). "Revealing the Doom at Little Missenden". Chiltern (227). The Chiltern Society: 14–15.
- Tristram, EW (1932). "Little Missenden Wall Paintings" (PDF). Records of Buckinghamshire. 12 (6). Buckinghamshire Archaeological Society: 308–314.
- Watkin, Bruce (1981). Buckinghamshire. A Shell Guide. London: Faber and Faber. p. 126. ISBN 978-0571138852.
