= St Catherine's Hill =

St Catherine's Hill may refer to:

- St Catherine's Hill, Dorset
- St Catherine's Hill, Isle of Wight
- St. Catherine's Hill, Hampshire
