= Christchurch Priory =

Church in Dorset, England

Coordinates: 50.73190°N 1.77466°W

- Priory Church of the Holy Trinity, Christchurch
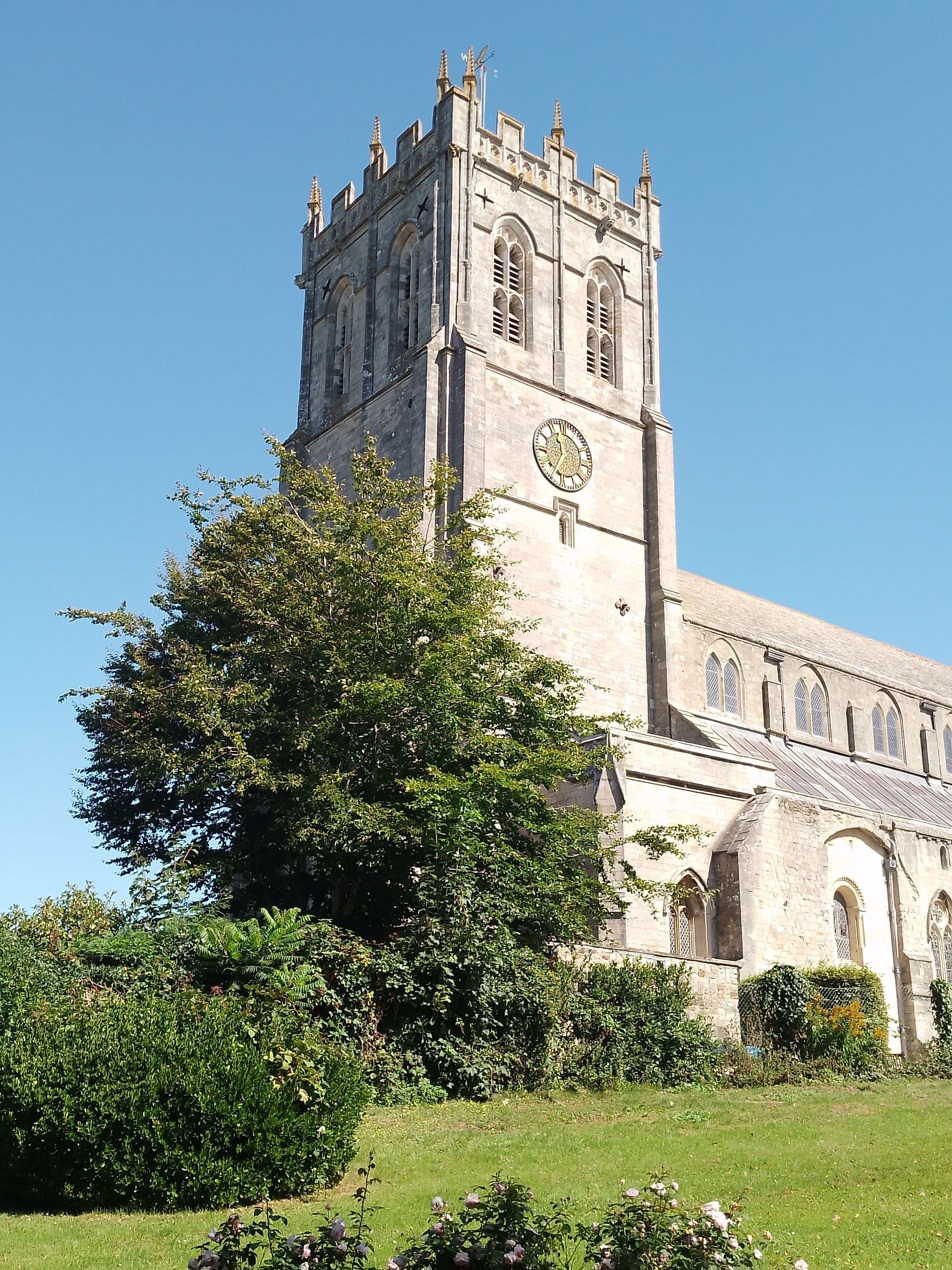
- Christchurch Priory photographed in 2023
- Christchurch Priory
- OS grid reference: SZ 16035 92498
- Country: England
- Denomination: Church of England
- Previous denomination: Catholic
- Churchmanship: Broad Church
- Website: www.christchurchpriory.org

History
- Dedication: Holy Trinity

Specifications
- Length: 311ft (91m)

Administration
- Province: Canterbury
- Diocese: Winchester
- Parish: Christchurch

Clergy
- Vicar: Interim Vicar Revd Richard Partridge

Christchurch Priory is an ecclesiastical parish and former priory church in Christchurch in the English county of Dorset (formerly in Hampshire). It is one of the longest parish churches in the country and is as large as many of the Church of England Cathedrals.

== Early history ==
The story of Christchurch Priory goes back to at least the middle of the 11th century, as the Domesday Book of 1086 says there was a priory of 24 secular canons here in the reign of Edward the Confessor. The Priory is on the site of an earlier church dating from 800AD. In 1094 a chief minister of William II, Ranulf Flambard, then Dean of Twynham, began the building of a church. Local legend has it that Flambard originally intended the church to be built on top of nearby St Catherine's Hill, but during the night all the building materials were mysteriously transported to the site of the present priory. Although in 1099 Flambard was appointed Bishop of Durham, work continued under his successors. A mid-12th century account recording the legend of the Christchurch Dragon indicates that by 1113 the new church was nearing completion under Dean Peter de Oglander. By about 1150 there was a basic Norman church consisting of a nave, a central tower and a quire extending eastwards from the crossing. It was during this period that another legend originated, that of the miraculous beam, which is thought to have brought about the change in the name of the town from Twynham to the present day Christchurch, but in fact the two names both featured in a grant dated AD 954 ('juxta opidum Twinam, id est, Cristescirce').

== Twelfth to fourteenth centuries ==
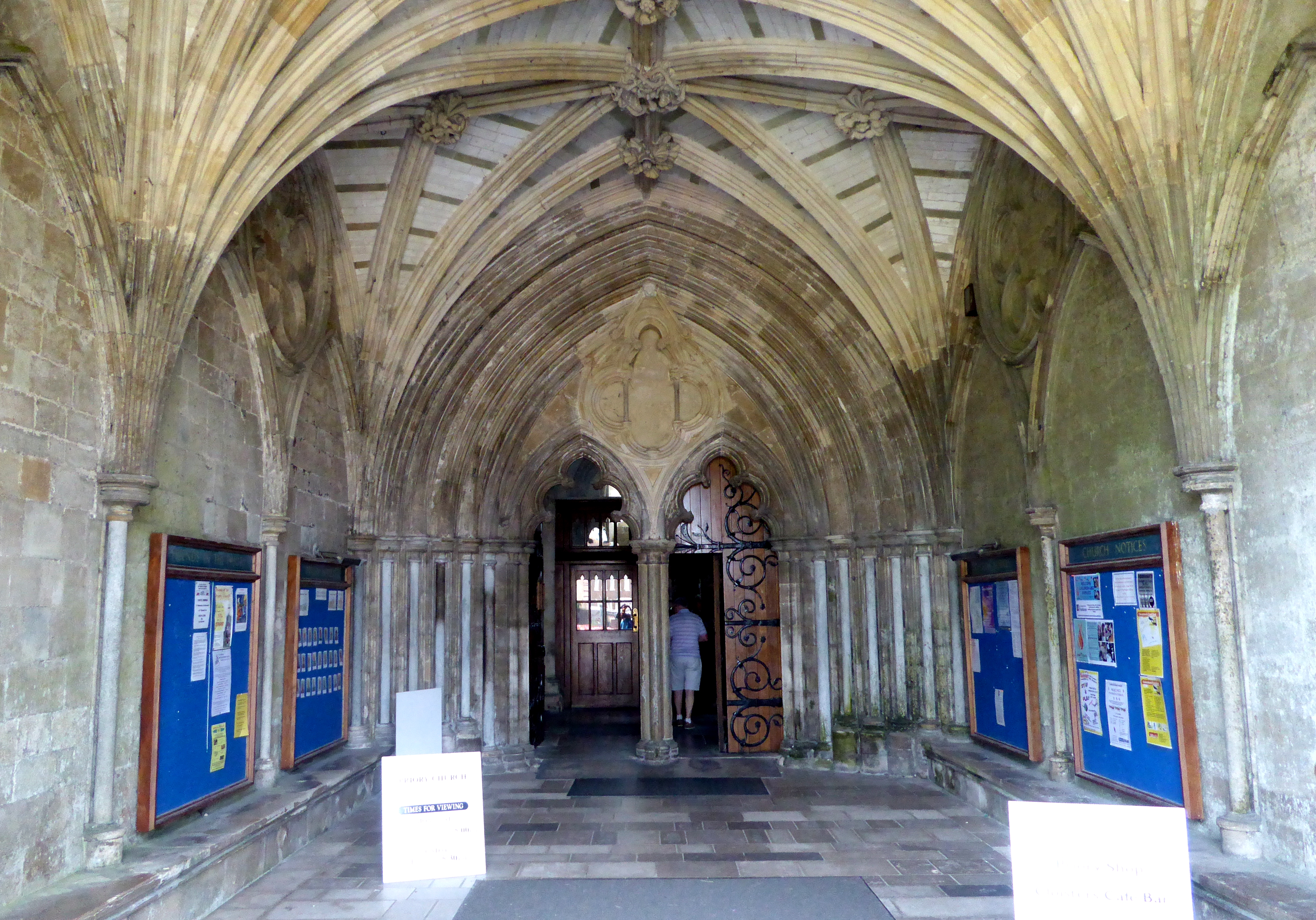
The entrance porch to the Priory

In 1150 Baldwin de Redvers, Lord of the Manor of Christchurch and Earl of Devon replaced the secular minster with an Augustinian priory. The de Redvers continued in their patronage of the priory for 150 years, until in 1293, Isabella de Fortibus, Countess of Devon (the last of the de Redvers line) sold her eastern estates to Edward I for about £4000. By this action, Christchurch became a Royal Manor which meant that in 1303 it was required to provide and man a ship to aid the King's campaign against Scotland.

In 1330 Baron William de Montacute was granted the manor by Edward III and thus became the 1st Earl of Salisbury (Second Creation).

In the 13th century there was a frenzy of building: the nave aisles were vaulted, the clerestory was built, the Montacute Chapels replaced the Norman apse in the north transept and work began on the North Porch, notable for its unusually large size. One of the chapels became the Church of St. Thomas the Apostle, although the current building mostly dates from the 18th century.

Although there is no documentary evidence relating to a central tower, the massive piers and arches at the corners of the transepts seem to indicate provision was made for one. A central tower would have been consistent with a Norman conventual church.

== Fourteenth to sixteenth centuries ==
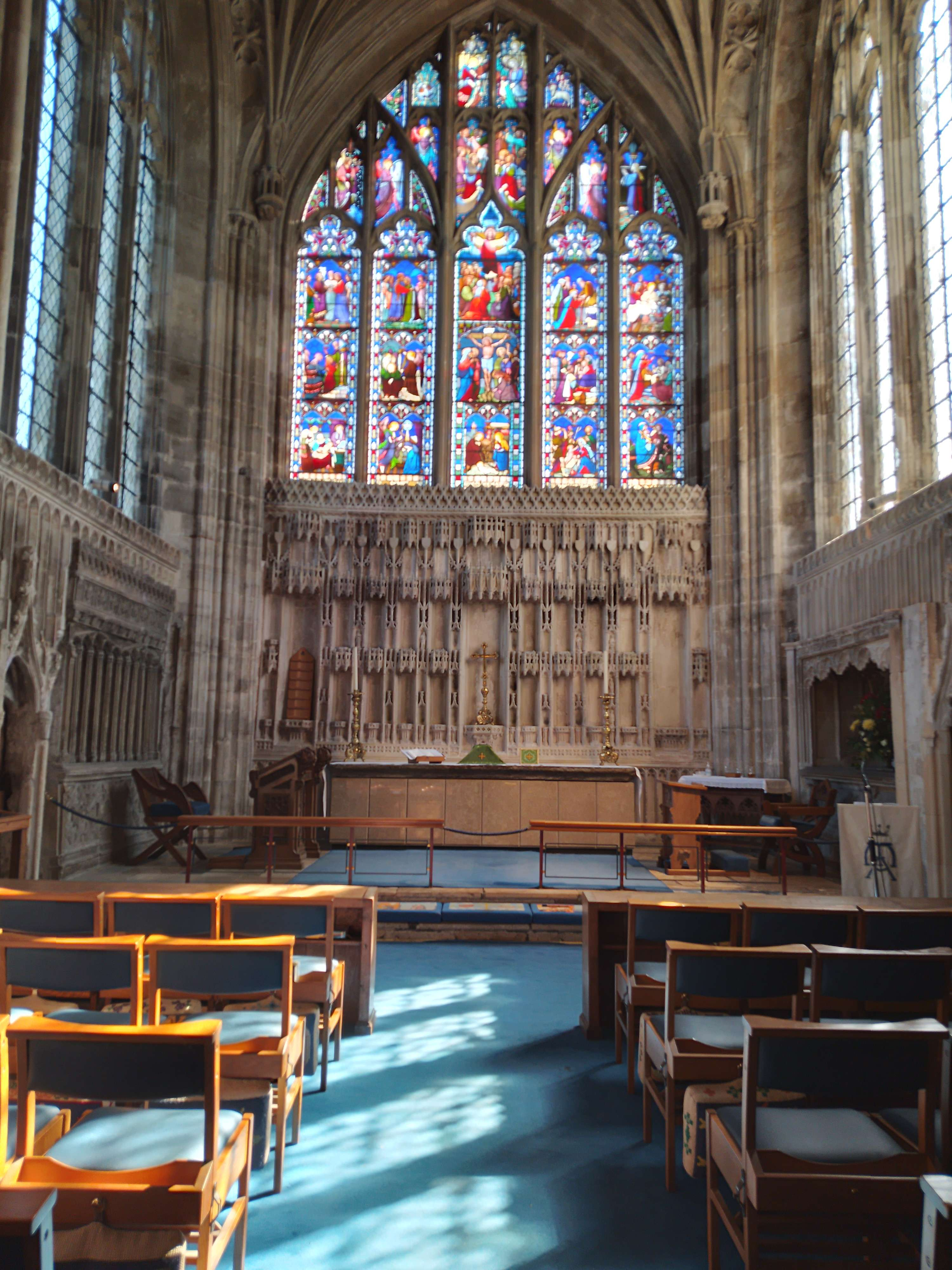
The Lady Chapel, added to the eastern end of the building in the 15th century

Work continued in the 14th century. The nave roof reached its present height no later than 1350 and towards the end of the 14th century work on the Lady Chapel was started. It was completed in the early 15th century and its pendant vaulting is thought to be the first of its kind in England. Also in the 15th century, the original quire was replaced and extended so that it joined onto the new Lady Chapel. This may have been as a result of the Norman tower collapsing, but this is not certain. What is certain is that the tower was rebuilt between 1470 and 1480. The Draper and Salisbury chantry chapels were completed by 1529. By this time, the church looked much as it does today.

== Christchurch Priory Cartulary ==
Much of what is known about Christchurch between the Norman Conquest and the mid-14th century comes from the Christchurch Priory Cartulary, which contains copies of over 1,300 of the monastery's most important documents. Most of it was written by just two clerks, one completing more than half before a second concluded the task in 1372. Further amendments and updates were added in the following decades.

The existence of the cartulary in the Priory library was recorded by John Leland shortly before the Dissolution, but its whereabouts in the decades after 1539 are uncertain. Almost a century later it was in the library of Sir Robert Cotton, a notable collector of medieval manuscripts. In 1753 the Cotton library collection was acquired by the newly founded British Museum, but the Christchurch Priory Cartulary was thought lost until it was discovered in an old cupboard in a garret of the Museum in 1837. It is today held in the British Library, where it is still catalogued by Sir Robert Cotton's filing system: Cotton MS Tiberius D.vi.

Efforts to translate the whole Cartulary began in the late 20th century, but not until 2007 was this task completed by Katharine Hanna and published by Hampshire County Council.

== Miraculous beam ==
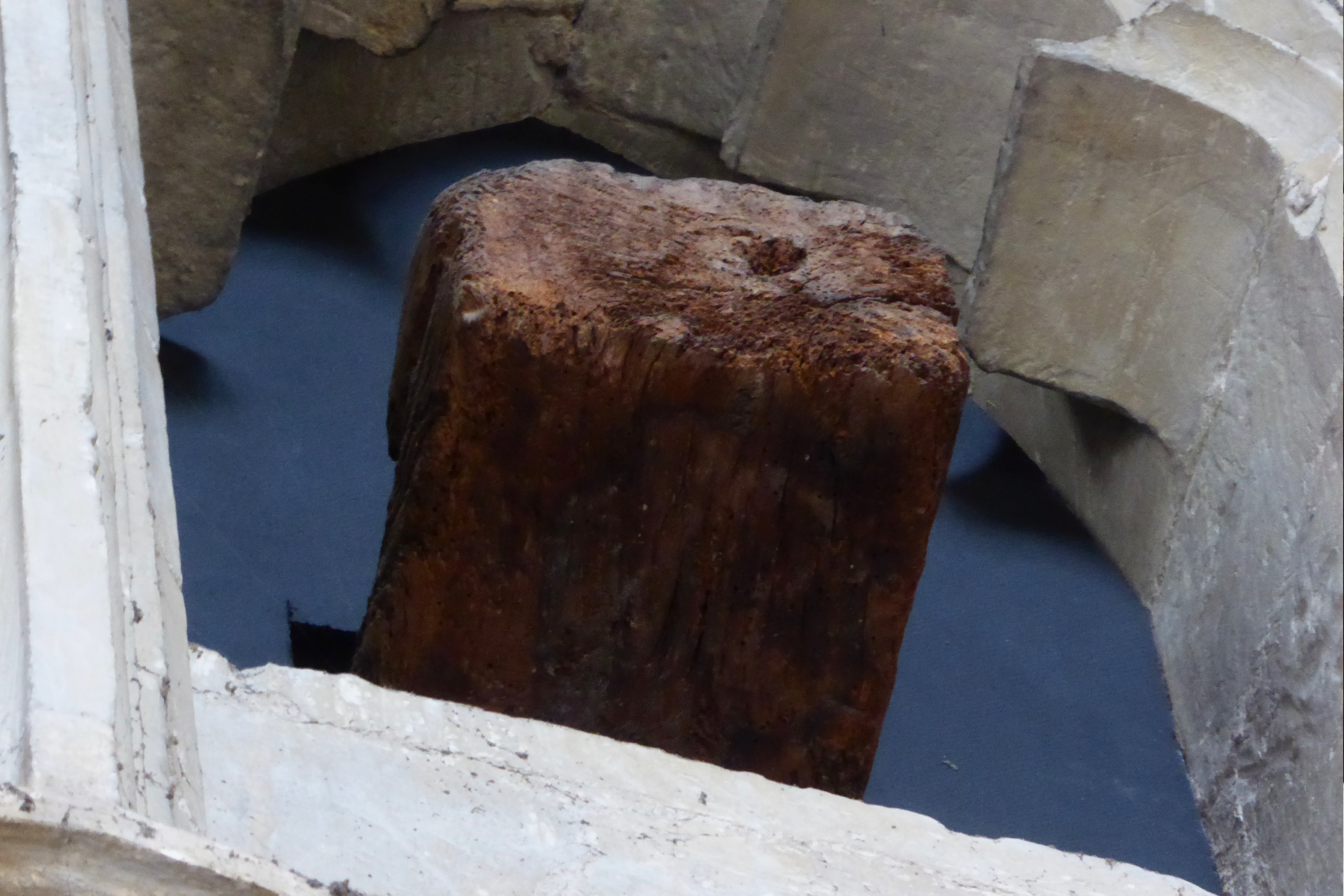
The Miraculous Beam, still exposed in the church

The legend of the miraculous beam dates to the early 12th century. The story is that a beam was found to have been cut too short when it was hoisted into place. This would have been embarrassing for the carpenters since the wood was expensive and would be difficult to replace. There was however a mysterious carpenter who had worked and eaten alone. The following day the carpenters returned and found the beam was now fitted in place. The unknown carpenter was never seen again, and the story came to be that it was Jesus Christ who had intervened. The church became Christ's Church of Twynham in commemoration of the event. In time the town became Twynham-Christchurch and eventually shortened to Christchurch. The miraculous beam can be seen today and is located in the Priory's ambulatory.

== Misericords ==
The Priory has 39 misericords, dating from three periods: 1250, 1350 and 1515. They show a mixture of mythological and folklore scenes, some of which appear to have been derived from Aesops fables. There are also some showing religious iconography, such as the emblems of St Mark and St Matthew.

== Dissolution ==
On 28 November 1539, John Draper, the last prior of Christchurch, surrendered the priory, and it was dissolved. Prior Draper was granted a pension of £133-6s–8d and the use of Somerford Grange for life.

The conventual buildings of the priory were pulled down soon after the dissolution. The King had intended to demolish the church as well as the conventual buildings, but in response to a plea from the townspeople, supported by Prior Draper, he granted it, together with the churchyard, to the churchwardens and inhabitants of Christchurch to be used as the parish church in perpetuity on 23 October 1540, a grant that was confirmed on 12 February 1612 by James I.

== Post-Dissolution ==
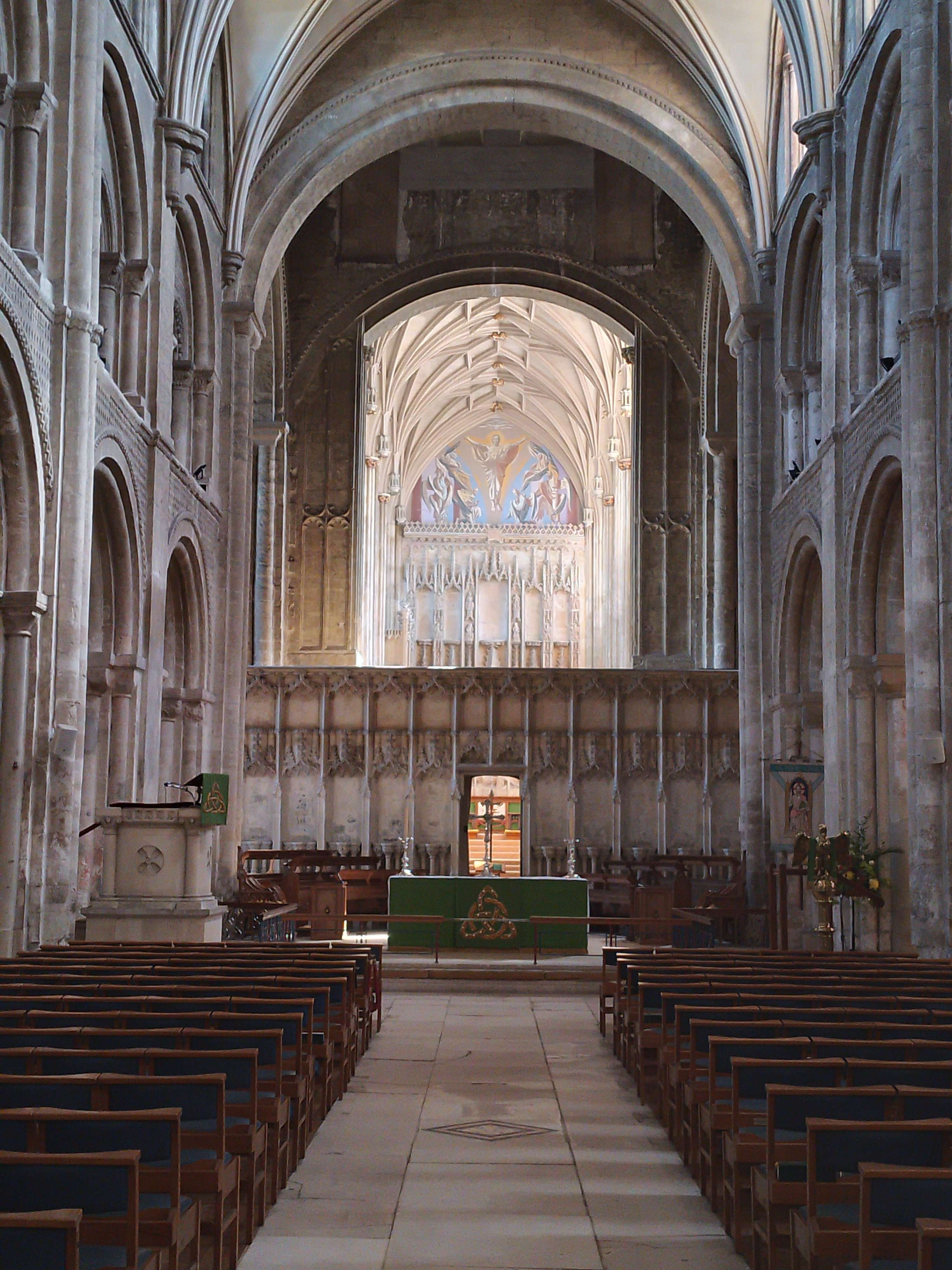
The nave of Christchurch Priory

After the Dissolution a corporation known as 'The Sixteen' was formed which became responsible for the temporal and ecclesiastical affairs of the parish, with the vicar and churchwardens being the principal officers.

In 1788 Gustavus Brander gave the priory a pipe organ, which was installed on the quire screen. It was removed in 1848.

In 1819 lath and plaster vaulting was installed in the nave, but a year later the vaulting of the south transept was found to be unsafe and had to be dismantled. In the late 19th and early 20th centuries extensive repairs were carried out, which included the insertion of tie-rods in the tower and the underpinning of the nave and south choir aisle walls in 1906. In 1912 a new floor was laid in the nave consisting of 6" of concrete, an inch of fine cement and wooden blocks on top.

A monument to the poet Percy Bysshe Shelley and his wife Mary Wollstonecraft Shelley, created by the sculptor Henry Weekes, was erected in the Priory church by the poet's son, Sir Percy Shelley, 3rd Baronet, in 1854, thirty-two years after his father's death. This monument was first offered to St Peter's Church, six miles away in Bournemouth, where Mary Shelley and other family members are buried. However, it was declined because of its size and possibly due to the unspoken disapproval of Shelley's reputation by the incumbent and churchwardens.

The War Memorial Chapel was dedicated in 1922.

Electric lighting was installed in June 1934.

== Modern history ==
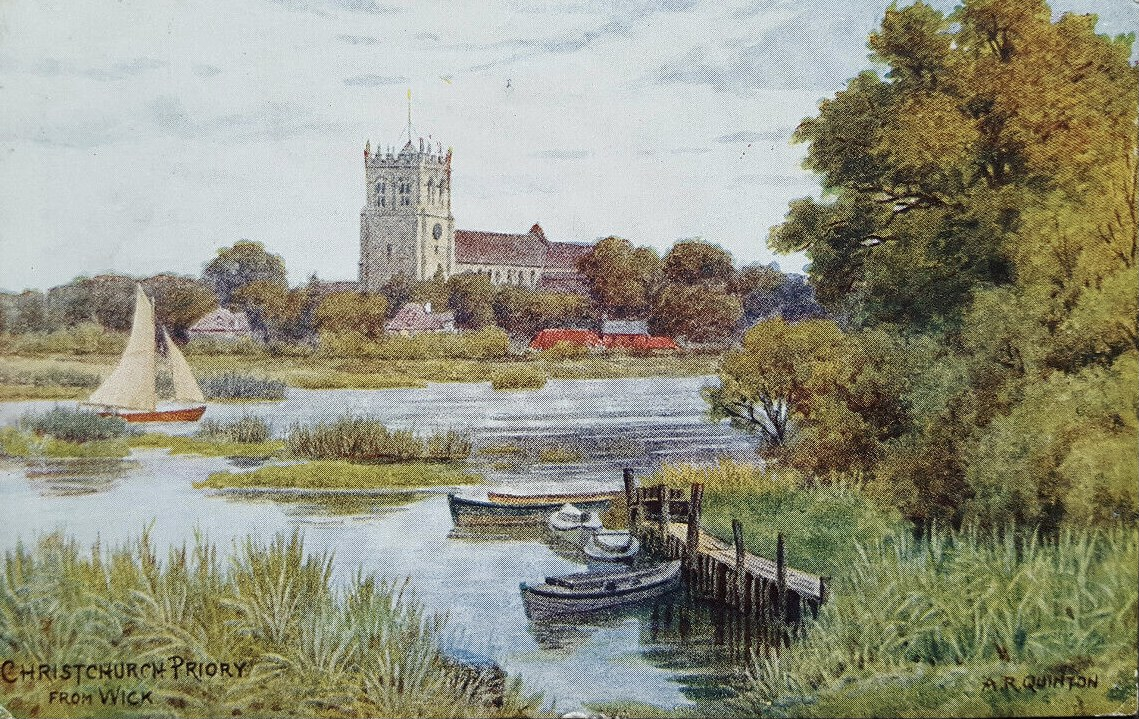
A. R. Quinton, Christchurch Priory from Wick, c. 1920

In 1976 Highcliffe Castle donated the glazing of the window in the south nave aisle, which had come originally from Jumièges Abbey in Normandy. The window depicts the lives of Saint Francis of Assisi and Saint Anne.

In 1999 a window celebrating the 900th anniversary of the priory was installed, which shows a starry night in which the Cross of Christ dominates, surrounded by a pattern of circles, the symbols of Eternity and Perfection, and the Chi-Rho monogram of Christ. Christchurch Priory, as its website puts it, is 'a living church' with daily services of Eucharist and Evening Prayer, as well as being open every day except Christmas for visitors.

In the 21st century The Times described it as 'the least appreciated of the Great Churches of England'.

In March 2021, a carving of a mask-wearing NHS worker was placed on the priory as a permanent tribute to the National Health Service's efforts during the COVID-19 pandemic. Carved by Rory Young, the stone feature is part of an ongoing project to replace damaged gargoyles and grotesques. The concept was inspired by a photograph of a doctor in an intensive care unit, wearing her PPE at the beginning of the pandemic, an image to represent all NHS workers for centuries to come.

In 2024, the building was added to the Heritage at Risk Register.

== Bells ==
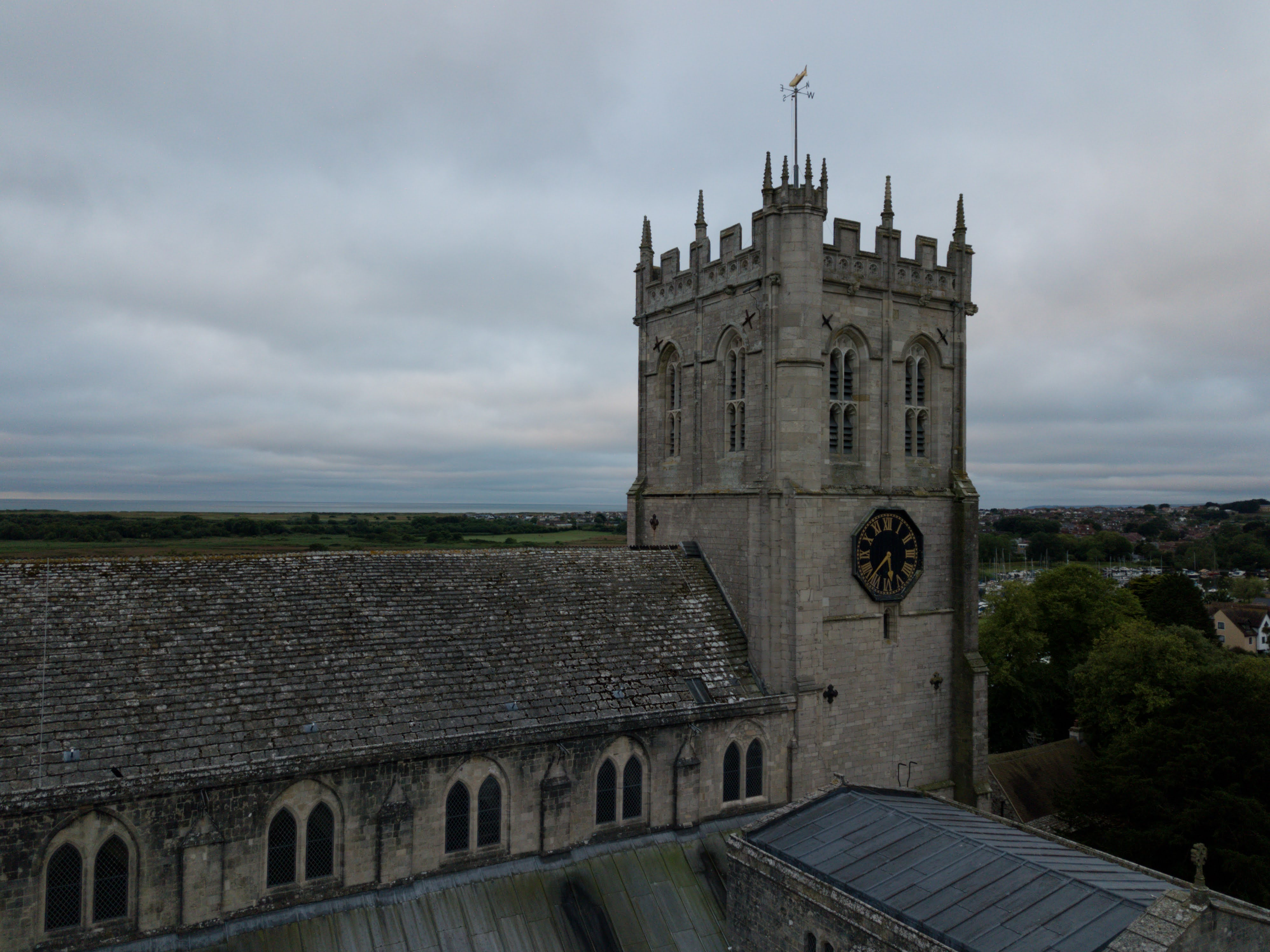
The Tower in which the 12 bells hang.

The Priory has a ring of 12 bells plus a 6th flat. The Bells are rung twice on Sundays and Monday nights and for extra services. They are in the Key of D and the Tenor (largest) weighs 30cwt (1½ Tons). The two oldest bells in the ring were cast in 1376 by John Rufford.

=== Brief history ===
Seven bells were recorded at the time of the dissolution of the Monasteries, and two of these were removed when the priory church became parochial in 1540. In 1633 this heavy five was converted into a lighter six by removing the tenor, recasting the 4th and adding two trebles. In 1755 Abel Rudhall augmented the ring to eight, and John Taylor & Co rehung the bells in a ten bell frame in 1885, replacing the 3rd at the same time. The bell they cast for Christchurch came out flat, and so a bell originally intended to be the 4th of a new ring of eight for The Saviour, Bolton, was supplied instead. The 1885 Taylor bells from The Saviour have now been transferred to St Peter's, Bolton, where they are the back eight of the present ring of twelve there.

Despite a ten bell frame being installed at Christchurch in 1885, it was not until 1904 that the ring was augmented, the trebles being cast by Llewellins & James of Bristol. In 1931 the 6th was replaced, with the old bell (cast in 1663 by William Purdue III of Salisbury bell foundry) being retained in the bellchamber. In 1932 the ring was augmented to twelve, with the 1904 trebles of ten being removed from the ring and placed, with their fittings, on a stand in the bell chamber and two new bells being cast to replace them. The old 6th of ten was scrapped in 1976, and in the same year the metal from the 1904 trebles of ten was used towards the casting of a flat 6th, with the inscriptions from the two bells being copied onto this. The new bell was cast and hung by Taylor's. More recently, in 1991, Whitechapel Bell Foundry overhauled the fittings and replaced the gudgeons and bearings.

=== Framework and fittings ===
The front four bells, the flat 6th and the 8th were cast with flat tops. The 5th and 6th have cable patterned canons, the 7th angular canons, and the remaining bells have had their canons removed.

The frame is of timber, and is basically that installed by Taylor's in 1885. A new foundation of RSJs was inserted beneath the frame in 1932, and two timber pits, which now contain the treble and 3rd, were added to the East side. A single cast iron lowsided pit for the flat 6th was added on the south side in 1976. The additions of 1932 and 1976 were both carried out by Taylor's.

The fittings are rather a mixture. The four trebles and the flat 6th have Taylor fittings contemporary with them and consisting of cast iron headstocks, ball bearings, traditional wheels, stays and sliders.. The back eight have timber stocks, presumably dating from either 1885 or 1904, traditional wheels by Llewellins & James and dating from 1904, and traditional stays and sliders. The bells were rehung on ball bearings by Taylor's in 1932, and the gudgeons and bearings were replaced by Whitechapel in 1991. There is also an Ellacombe chiming apparatus, which was installed by Llewellins & James in 1904.

Bell	Date	Founder	Diameter	Weight
Treble	1932	John Taylor & Co	25.5"	5-0-24
2nd:	1932	John Taylor & Co	27"	5-3-12
3rd:	1932	John Taylor & Co	28"	6-0-14
4th:	1932	John Taylor & Co	30.5"	7-1-20
5th	1755	Abel Rudhall	33"	7-0-0
6th	1755	Abel Rudhall	34"	7-2-14
7th	1885	John Taylor & Co	35.5"	9-3-20
8th	1931	John Taylor & Co	37.5"	10-2-19
9th	c1376+	John Rufford	39.63"	11-0-0
10th	c1376+	John Rufford	43.25"	15-0-0
11th	c1730+	Abel Rudhall	48.88"	20-0-0
Tenor	c1730+	Abel Rudhall	53.88"	30-0-0 in D Major
Flat 6th	1976	John Taylor & Co	33.5"	8-1-0

== Music ==
=== Choir ===
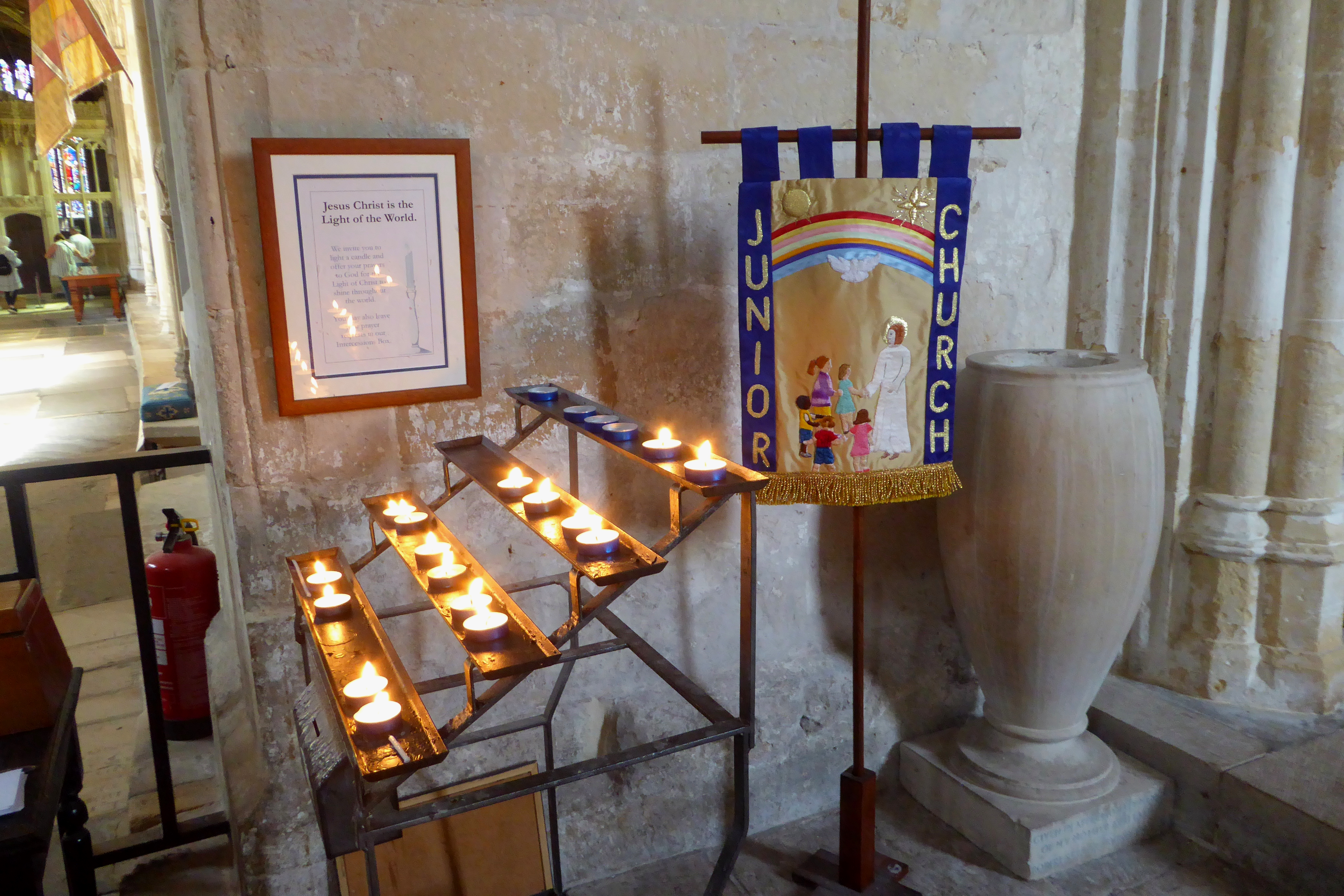
Prayer lights and banner at the Priory

The choir at the priory consists of a boys choir, a girls choir, and a men's choir. The children of the choir can earn medals as they gain experience and skill, the rank of chorister is: probationer – full choir member (given surplice) – light blue medal – dark blue medal – red medal – purple medal (Yellow for girls) – deputy (green medal) – head (green medal).

The choir sing two services during term time on Sundays:

Eucharist: 10:00 – 11:00

Evensong: 6:30 – 7:30

The men sing both services while the two children's choirs alternate weekly between morning services and evening service (one week a choir will do eucharist, the next week it will do evensong).

On occasion, such as Christmas and Easter services Both children's choirs will sing alongside the men.

=== Organ ===
On 17 July 1999 a new pipe organ was dedicated and installed in the south transept. It is an extensive rebuild by Nicholson of Worcester of the previous organ, weighing around 20 tonnes, with nearly 4,000 pipes, some of which are from the original 1788 organ. The new organ cost in excess of £500,000, of which £373,000 was provided by the Arts Council from the National Lottery Fund.

A specification of the organ can be found on the National Pipe Organ Register

=== Organists ===
- Henry Holloway 1933–1936
- Geoffrey Tristram 1949–1979
- Clive Harries 1980–1983
- Roger Overend 1983–1986
- Martin Schellenberg 1986–1995
- Geoffrey Morgan 2002–present

=== Directors of music ===
- Geoffrey Tristram 1949–1979
- Martin Schellenberg 1986–1995
- Andrew Post 2001–2009
- Hugh Morris 2009–2015
- Simon Earl 2015–

=== Girls choir music directors ===
- Cathy Lamb 2005–2007
- Mary Goodman 2007–present

=== Assistant organists ===
- Michael Andrews
- Mark Hammond
- Sean Tucker 1992–1994

== Notable burials ==
- Sir Thomas West (1312 – 3 September 1386) and wife Alice FitzHerbert (died 1395)
- Thomas West, 1st Baron West
- William de Redvers, 5th Earl of Devon
- John Draper, the last prior of Christchurch
- Hugh Rose, 1st Baron Strathnairn

== See also ==
- List of English abbeys, priories and friaries serving as parish churches

== Gallery ==
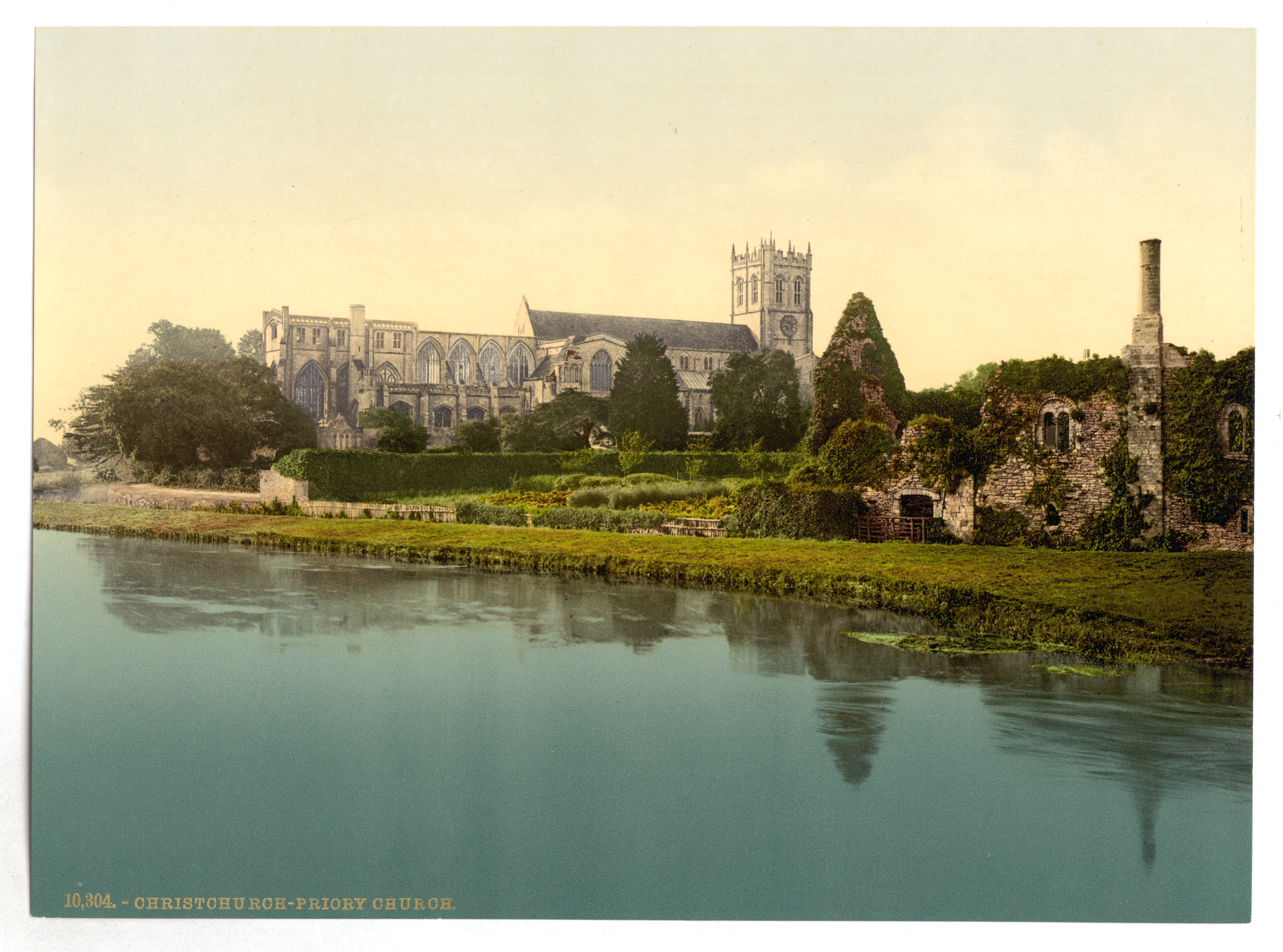
Photocrom print, 1890-1900

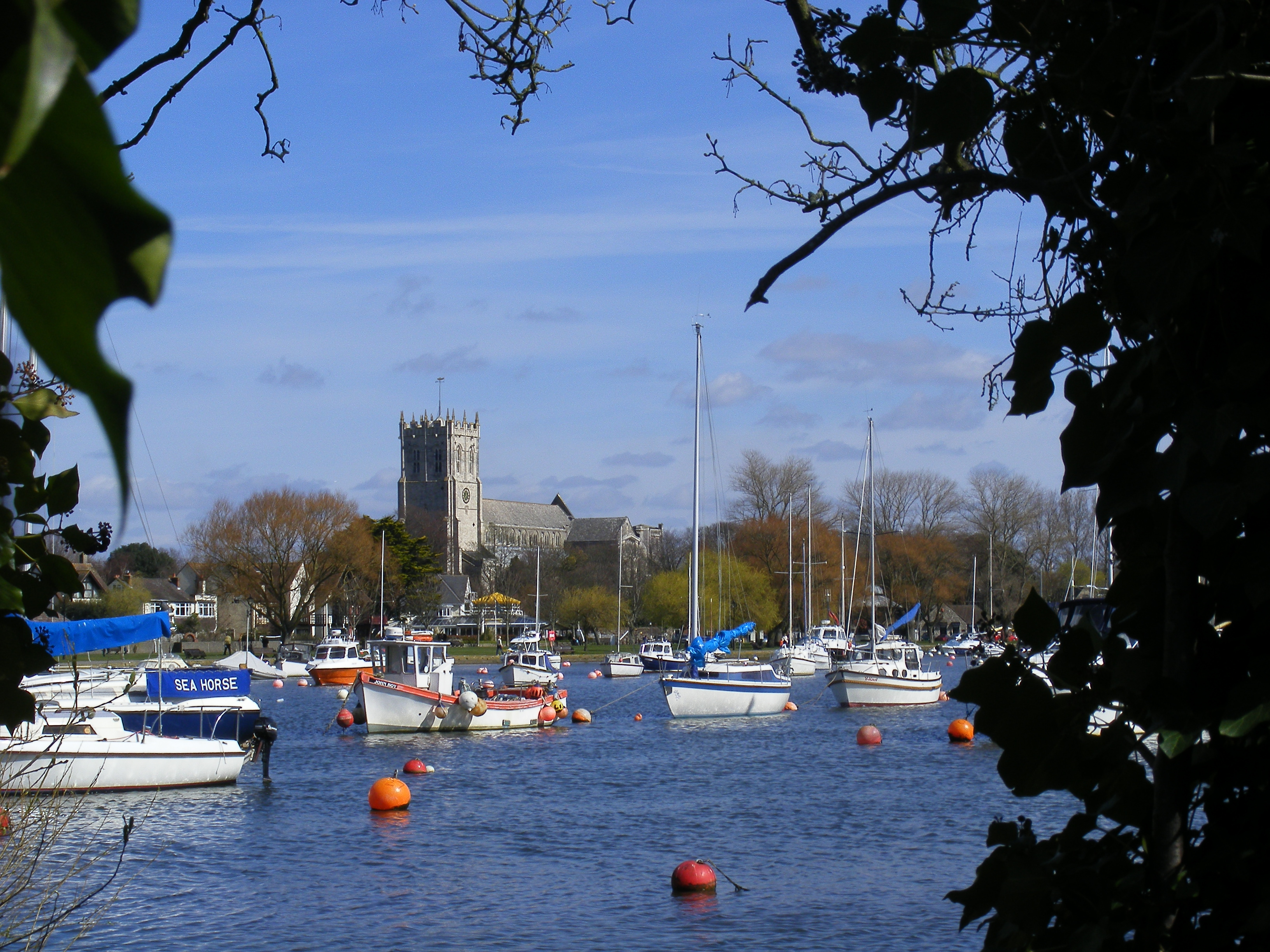
Christchurch Priory from Wick, across the River Stour

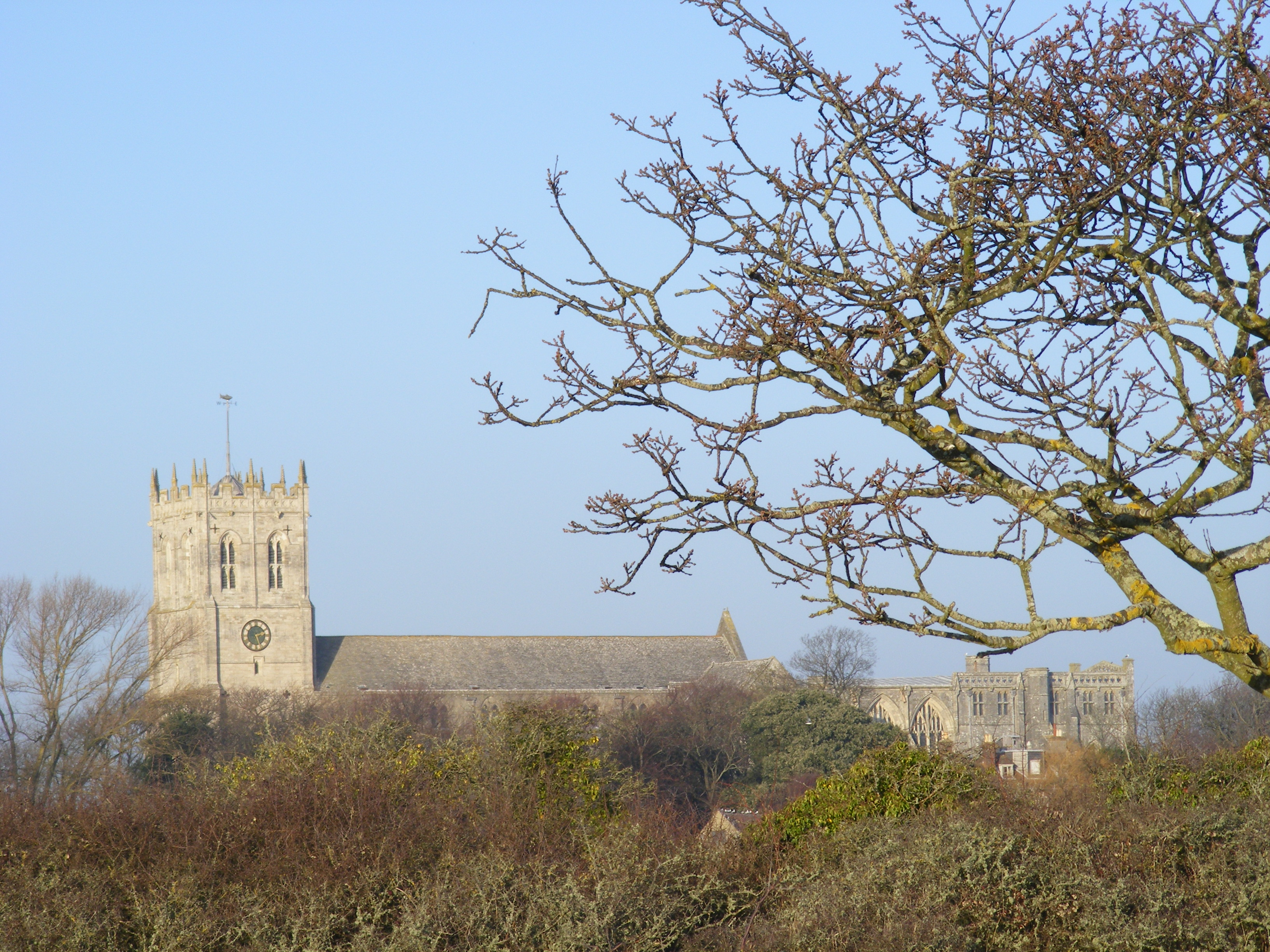
Christchurch from Wick Fields

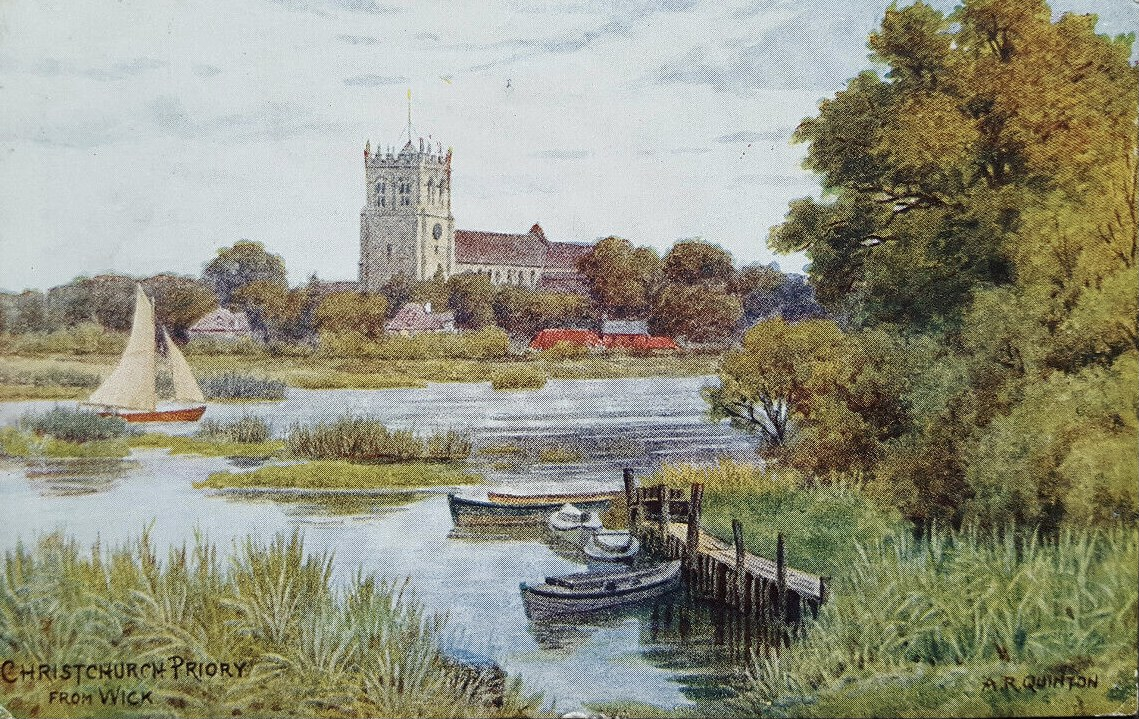
View from Wick, c. 1920

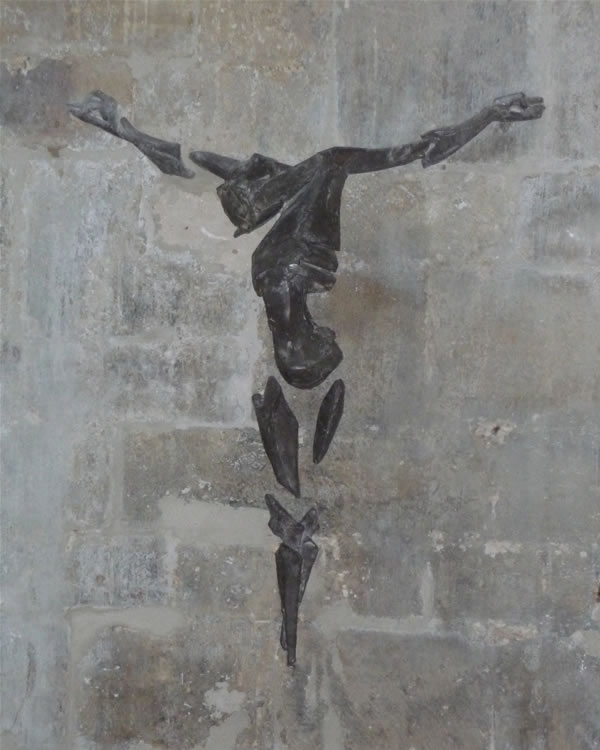
Christchurch Priory Crucifix sculpture by Laurence Broderick
