= G. D. Cunningham =

English concert organist

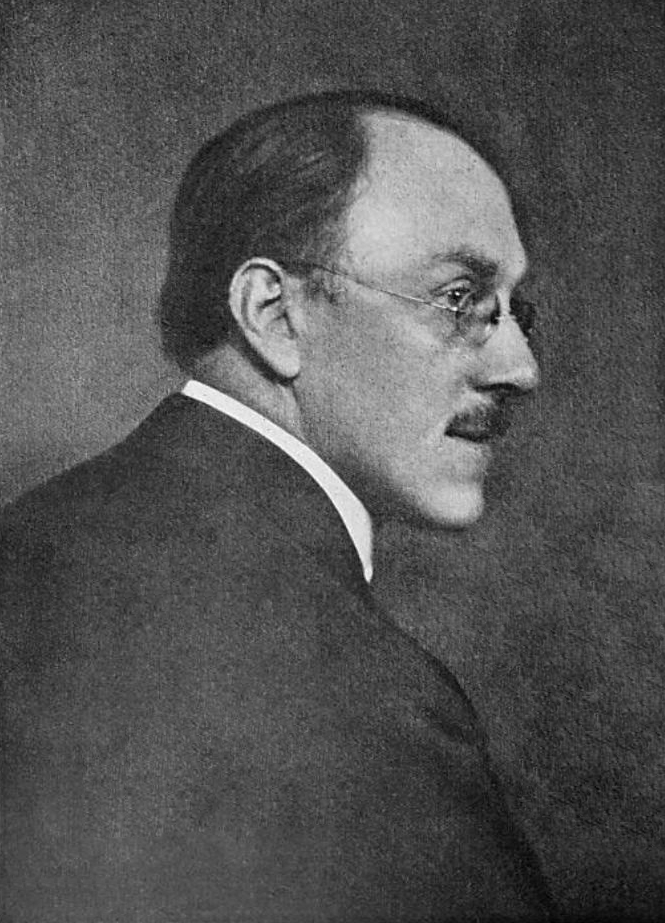
- Born: George Dorrington Cunningham; 2 October 1878; London, England
- Died: 14 August 1948 (aged 69); Birmingham, England
- Education: Guildhall School of Music; Royal Academy of Music
- Occupation: Organist

George Dorrington Cunningham (2 October 1878 – 14 August 1948) was an English concert organist.

== Biography ==
G. D. Cunningham was born in London to musical parents, Cunningham studied piano with his mother, subsequently switching to organ at the Guildhall School of Music. Upon graduation he studied with Josiah Booth at Park Chapel, Crouch End, North London. From there he enrolled in the Royal Academy of Music, where he became an FRCO at the age of eighteen and organist of the Alexandra Palace at twenty-two, in 1901.

After 1900 Cunningham's fame as a recitalist steadily grew. However, during the armistice celebrations of 1918 the instrument at Alexandra Palace was wantonly wrecked, and was not restored and re-opened again until December 1929. From 1920 to 1924 he was organist of St Alban's Church, Holborn.

In 1924 Cunningham was appointed Birmingham City Organist and Birmingham University Organist. He was conductor of the City of Birmingham Choir for many years. He also played often at the Town Hall of the same city. In September 1930 he made recordings on the restored Alexandra Palace organ.

Cunningham's most important students were E. Power Biggs, George Thalben-Ball, who succeeded him at Birmingham in 1949, Fela Sowande, Michael (Stockwin) Howard, Geoffrey Tristram, Geraint Jones and Arnold Richardson.

Cunningham died in Birmingham on 14 August 1948, aged 69.

== Sources ==
- F. Aprahamian, The Alexandra Palace Organ (sleevenote for HMV HQM 1199), (Hayes 1970)
