= River Misbourne =

River in Buckinghamshire, England

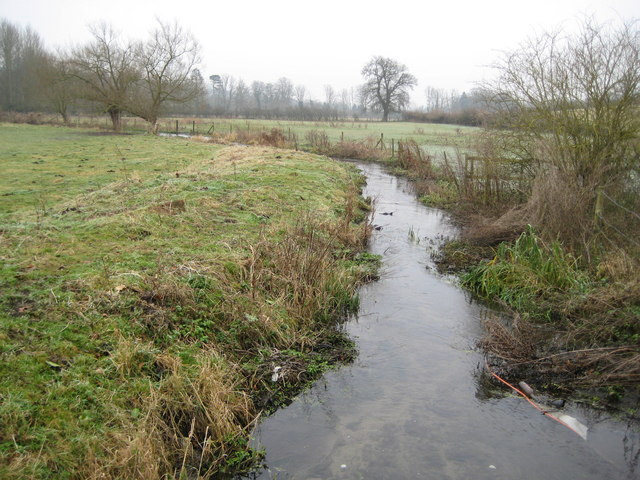
- River Misbourne near Chalfont St Giles

Location
- Country: England

Physical characteristics
- Source
  - location: Great Missenden; Buckinghamshire
  - coordinates: 51°42′36″N 0°42′44″W
  - elevation: 129 m (423 ft)
- Mouth
  - location: River Colne near Denham
  - coordinates: 51°33′43″N 0°29′01″W
  - elevation: 34 m (112 ft)
- Length: 27km (16.8 miles)

Basin features
- River system: Thames

The River Misbourne is a chalk river that rises in a field on the outskirts of Great Missenden in Buckinghamshire, passing through Little Missenden, Old Amersham, Chalfont St Giles, Chalfont St Peter and under the Chiltern railway line and the M25 motorway to its confluence with the River Colne just north of where the Colne is crossed by Western Avenue, the A40 road. It falls by around 94 m (310 ft) in the course of its 27 km (17 miles) length.

== Etymology ==
The name Misbourne is first attested, in the form Misseburne, in 1407. The -bourne element is agreed to derive from Old English burna ('stream, river'), but the etymology of the first element is uncertain. It is thought to occur in the names of both Great and Little Missenden, and also in the Tring place-name Miswell. Frank Stenton and Allen Mawer guessed that it came from a hypothetical Anglo-Saxon personal name Myrsa, which they also supposed to be found in the name of Mursley. Eilert Ekwall suggested that it came from a lost Old English word related to English moss, and to Danish mysse and Swedish missne (which denote plants of the genus Calla, such as water arum). Recent researchers have tentatively preferred Ekwall's guess, in which case the name Misbourne would once have meant something like 'river where water-plants/marsh-plants grow'.

== History ==
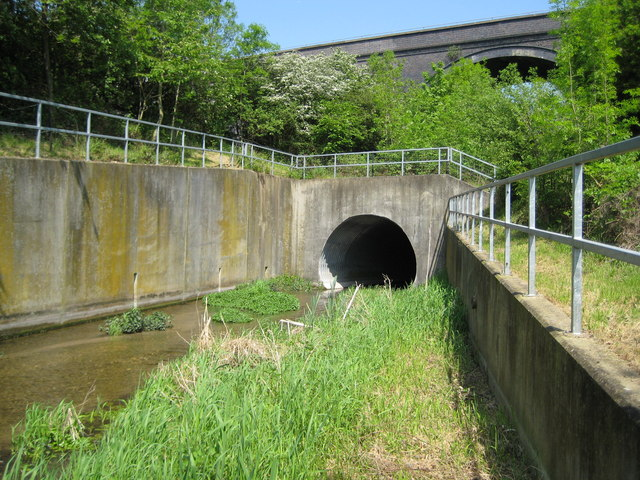
River Misbourne was diverted via culverts under M25 motorway. This is the downstream portal of the culvert. The railway viaduct is visible over the trees in the background.

In 1906 the Great Western Railway (GWR) constructed the Chalfont Viaduct to carry trains between London and High Wycombe across the river. In the mid-1980s, when the M25 was being constructed, the Misbourne was diverted under the motorway via underground concrete culverts. The route of the motorway was then aligned to pass through the arches of the Chalfont Viaduct.

== Flow ==
The river flows over a bed of impermeable material on top of a porous substrate. This state is only quasi-stable since in periods of low rainfall the water table drops below the level of the impermeable layer. If groundworks are then carried out which damage this layer, the river can sink into the porous substrate and disappear.

The Misbourne has had intermittently reduced or stopped-flow due to abstraction for domestic supply from the aquifers feeding it. This has caused its course to be neglected to lead to partial obstruction. When the water company undertook remedial measures to restore the flow, there were episodes of flooding in both Chalfont St Peter and Chalfont St Giles. Subsequent work has restored the integrity of the course. The upper part of the river was dry for over 3 years starting in November 2003 but re-appeared in February 2007 following several months of above-average rainfall which raised the water table.
