= Church of St Thomas the Apostle, Lymington =

Church of St Thomas the Apostle
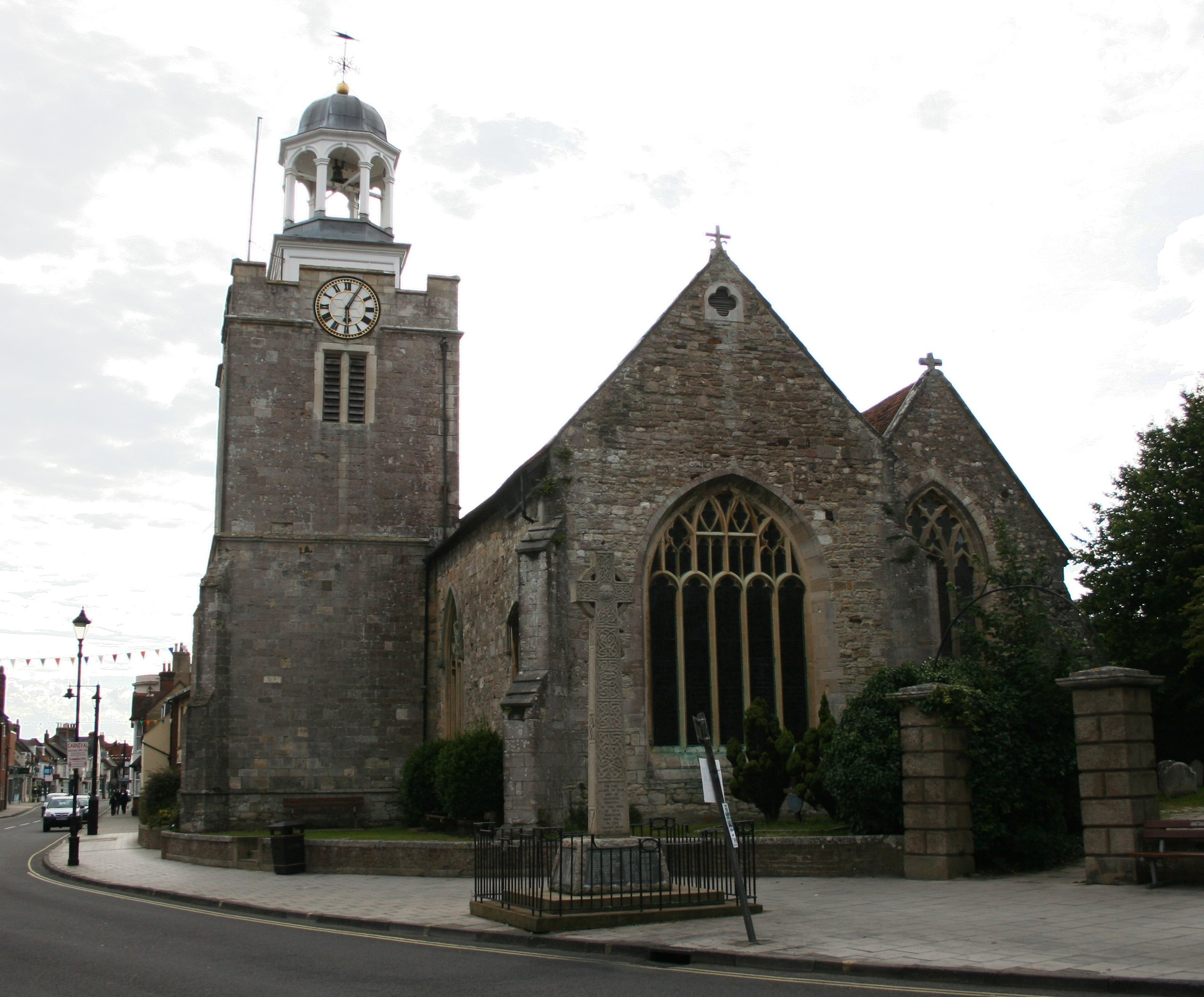
- Church of St Thomas the Apostle
- 50°45′27.2″N 1°32′42.6″W
- OS grid reference: SZ 32181 95442
- Location: Lymington
- Country: England
- Denomination: Church of England

History
- Founded: 13th century

Architecture
- Functional status: Active

Administration
- Province: Canterbury
- Diocese: Winchester
- Archdeaconry: Bournemouth
- Deanery: Lyndhurst
- Parish: Lymington

Clergy
- Vicar: Lee Thompson

The Church of St Thomas the Apostle in Lymington in Hampshire, is the main Anglican Church of England parish church for the town. There has been a church on the site for 800 years and the original foundations are believed to date to the reign of Henry III but was largely rebuilt in the 17th and 18th centuries.

== History ==
The church was originally built as a Chapel of Christchurch Priory and has been expanded over the centuries. The tower was added around 1670. In 1953, the church was designated Grade II* listed.

== The bells ==
The tower, with its distinctive cupola, holds a peal of 8 bells, the Tenor (the biggest bell) weighs 20cwt-1qrs-3lbs and strikes the note Eb. Three of the bells date from 1901 and were cast by John Taylor & Co in Loughborough. The other five bells were cast by Robert II Wells in 1785.
