= Geoffrey Tristram =

British organist, recitalist, and teacher

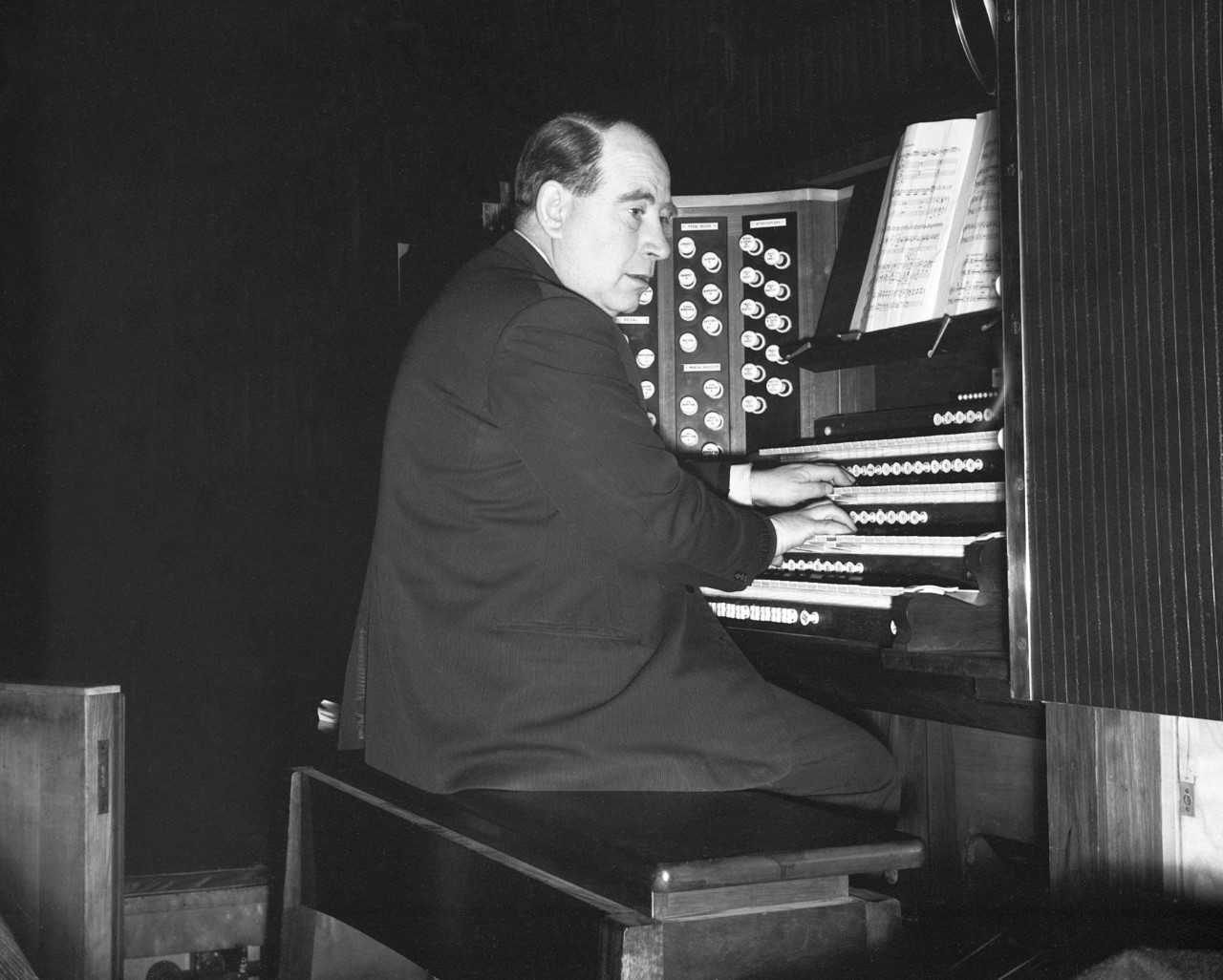
- Tristram at the organ of Christchurch Priory
- Born: 2 August 1917; Stourbridge
- Died: 5 June 1979 (aged 61)
- Education: Reading School
- Occupations: organist; recitalist; teacher
- Spouse: Irene Wellstead (m. 1946)
- Children: 2

Geoffrey Oliver Tristram (2 August 1917 – 5 June 1979) was a British organist, recitalist and teacher. Raised in Worcestershire and Reading, Tristram gained his Fellowship of the Royal College of Organists aged 17 before moving to Bournemouth following the Second World War. There he was Organist and Choirmaster of Christchurch Priory from 1949 until his death, and became renowned for the high quality and prodigious number of his recitals and BBC broadcasts. Tristram also pursued a teaching career, becoming Head of Music at St. Peter's School in Bournemouth in 1960.

In a speech given in the mid-1970s, Tristram claimed to have

[...] played for 4500 services, 2300 weddings, listened (not very attentively) to 4000 sermons, and have played in the neighbourhood of 17576 hymns, and given some 400 recitals and over 100 broadcasts.

== Life and career ==
=== Early years ===
Tristram was born in Stourbridge, then in Worcestershire, the only child of Oliver and Elsie Tristram. The family moved to Reading, Berkshire in 1925, when Tristram was aged 8, where he was educated at Reading School. Despite an early ambition to become a concert pianist, he decided to become an organist, gaining his ARCO aged 16 and his FRCO the following year – the youngest in the country at the time. World War II meant he was unable to take up his scholarship to the University of Oxford, though he took lessons from Dr G. D. Cunningham at Birmingham, and worked for the Post Office during the war. Subsequently, moving to Bournemouth, he became articled to an estate agent's firm, and played the organ at All Saints', Southbourne.

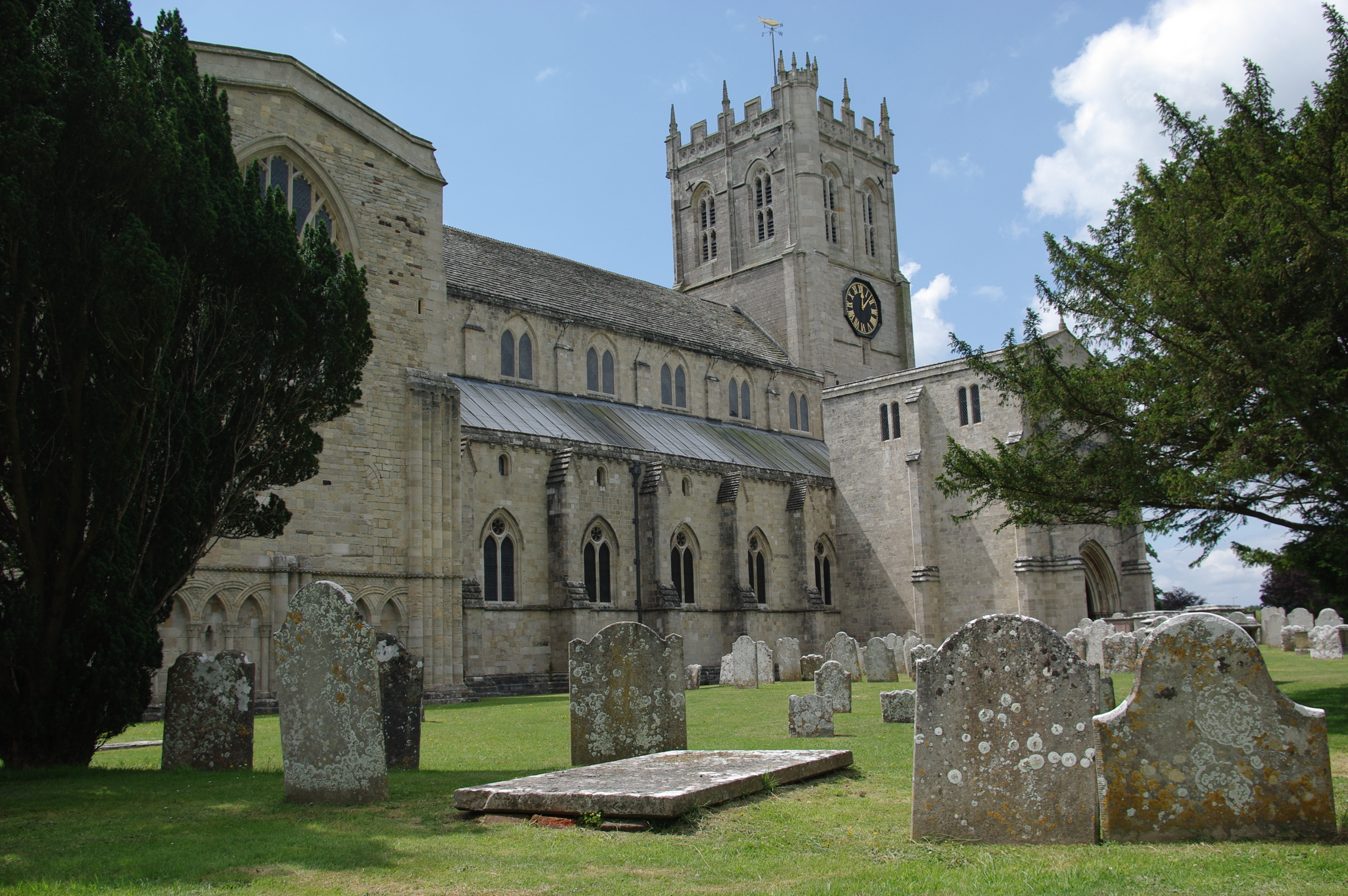
Christchurch Priory.

=== Christchurch Priory ===
Tristram was appointed Organist and Master of the Choristers of Christchurch Priory, Bournemouth in 1949 – a post he held until his death 30 years later. The position came with a residence, the Georgian house 'Church Hatch' next door to the Priory, where Tristram enjoyed hosting musicians, foreign students, events and parties for the duration of the time he was resident there.

After Compton rebuilt the Priory organ in 1951, Tristram started summer series of weekly organ recitals, given by many famous names, such as Francis Jackson and Sidney Campbell, as well as beginners and, particularly, himself. Several new stops were added to the organ in 1964, though it remained caseless and became unserviceable in the 1970s, leading to the installation of a 4-manual digital organ which was of high enough quality to be used for recitals and broadcasts. The pipe organ was eventually rebuilt and a case added by Nicholson in 1999.

From the modest group of singers that constituted the Priory choir when he arrived in 1949, Tristram created a choir of 14 men and 20 boys which was fine enough to regularly broadcast Choral Evensong on BBC Radio 3 and tour internationally.

=== Recitalist and broadcaster ===
Tristram was most celebrated as a performer, both as a solo organist and as an accompanist, and was well known for his recitals and broadcasts even before he was appointed to the Priory. According to the BBC Genome Project, Tristram participated in the region of 80 BBC broadcasts as a soloist, accompanist or conductor.

=== Teacher, conductor and composer ===
Despite unhappy memories of his own schooldays, Tristram decided to give up estate agency in favour of teaching. He became Music Master at Poole Grammar School, before moving to Twynham School, Christchurch and subsequently becoming Head of Music at St Peter's Catholic School, Bournemouth, run by the De La Salle Brothers. There he instituted an annual tradition of week-long performances of Gilbert and Sullivan operettas, which he was responsible for directing and accompanying from the organ in lieu of an orchestra. Tristram was also Musical Director of Bournemouth Gilbert and Sullivan Society, with whom he performed a total of ten productions between 1949 and 1959 at the Palace Court Theatre. He did not have much time for composition, though his Mass in A flat, which was premiered by the St. Peter's School choir in Notre-Dame, is still performed today by the choir of Christchurch Priory.

=== Death and legacy ===
Tristram died on 5 June 1979 aged 61, following a major heart attack while teaching at school. His funeral at the Priory was attended by over 300 people. In his memory, a voice training choristership was awarded in 1981. The Priory was floodlit on 2 August 2017 to commemorate him on what would have been his 100th birthday.

In 2022, a biography of Tristram written by Professor David Baker, Geoffrey Tristram: A Very British Organist: “I am he”, was published. The book was launched with an organ recital given by Professor Baker at the Priory on 4 August 2022.

=== Personal life ===
Tristram married Irene Wellstead at Christ Church, Reading on 30 March 1946, having met working at a telephone exchange during the war. They resided at 'Church Hatch' near Christchurch Priory, and had two children: Michael (a sometime Residentiary Canon of Portsmouth Cathedral), born 1950, and Carolyn, born 1955. Tristram held a lifelong interest in rail transport, and built a large model railway at his home. He also enjoyed foreign holidays, particularly to Cabrerets in the Lot Department of southwestern France.

== Discography ==
Albums and LPs:

- Music for the Quiet Hours (1965), with violinist Raymond Mosley
- Organ Music at Christchurch Priory, Hampshire (1965)
- Organ Music from Lakeland (1971)
- The Organ in Christchurch Priory (1977)
- Schubert: Mass in C (1978), with the choir of Christchurch Priory
- The Historic Pipe Organ in Christchurch Priory

Singles and EPs:

- Organ Music at Christchurch Priory, Hampshire (1964)
- Organ Music at Christchurch Priory, Hampshire (1965)
