= Villiers Quartet =

Villers Quartet
- Genre: Classical
- Years active: 2011–present
- Members: Katie Stillman; Tamaki Higashi; Carmen Flores; Toby White

Formed in 2011, the Villiers Quartet are a string quartet based in the United Kingdom. Active in both recording and live performance, they have previously been the quartet-in-residence at the University of Oxford and Nottingham High School.

== Background ==
The name of the quartet comes from Villiers Street in London, which is known partly for its highly musical atmosphere. The Villiers Quartet have featured in events across the UK, including the Brit Jazz Festival and the British Music Society, and have played masterclasses at the University of Nottingham, Goshen College, Dartmouth College, Syracuse University, Sherborne School and Nottingham High School.

The quartet provided the soundtrack to the 2015 BBC One television series, Lady Chatterley's Lover, and have performed live on BBC Radio 3 as part of the Leamington International string quartet series. They have a particular interest in performing the works of British composers, and have made recordings of music by Delius, Peter Racine Fricker, William Alwyn, and Robert Still. They have also premiered music by 21st century British composers and commissioned new pieces.

== Members ==
Member	Role
Katie Stillman	Violin I
Tamaki Higashi	Violin II
Carmen Flores	Viola
Toby White	Cello

== Critical response ==
The quartet has received a generally positive response. Classical Music Magazine awarded them five stars in June 2015, and Fiona Maddocks of the Observer gave them 4 stars, remarking that their playing is, "characterised by boundless melody".
