= St Catherine's Hill, Dorset =

Coordinates: 50.757115°N 1.796639°W

St Catherine's Hill
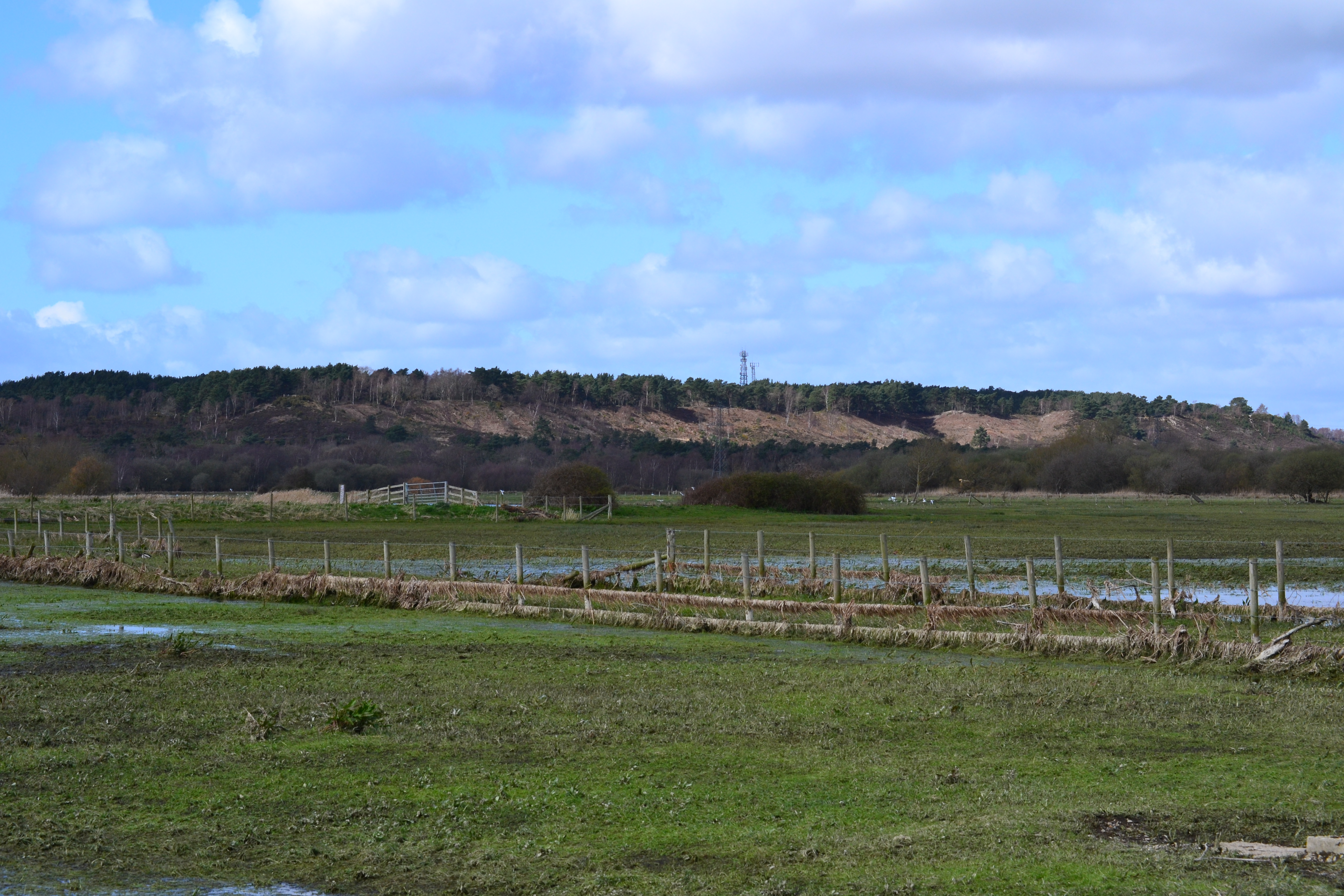
- St Catherine's Hill seen from the Avon Valley

- Location within Dorset
- OS grid reference: SZ 14441 95299
- Unitary authority: Bournemouth, Christchurch and Poole
- Ceremonial county: Dorset
- Region: South West
- Country: England
- Sovereign state: United Kingdom
- Post town: Christchurch
- Postcode district: BH23
- Police: Dorset
- Fire: Dorset and Wiltshire
- Ambulance: South Western

St Catherine's Hill is a 53-metre (174 ft) hill in the borough of Christchurch which, together with Ramsdown and Blackwater hills, forms a ridge between the Avon and Stour valleys. It is a Site of Special Scientific Interest with some areas additionally designated as Special Protection Areas and/or Special Areas of Conservation. The hill provides a range of habitats with both wet and dry heathland, coniferous and broadleaf woodland and scrubland; and is home to some rare flora and fauna including the sand lizard, smooth snake, silver-studded blue butterfly and two types of carnivorous plant.

Humans have been visiting the hill as far back as the Bronze Age and there are a number of ancient monuments sited there, including several tumuli, a Roman signal station and what is thought to be an Iron Age animal pound. The military have made extensive use of the area since at least the Roman occupation; it served as training ground for troops during the Crimean War and both World Wars, and was the site of a nuclear bunker during the Cold War. Most visitors today use the hill as an area to exercise their dogs or for other recreational activities such as cycling, jogging and horse riding.

== Toponymy ==
The hill takes its name from a chapel dedicated to St Catherine of Alexandria that once stood on its summit. 12th century documents suggest the hill was formerly known as Richedon, Old English for 'Great Hill', perhaps to compare with Littledown across the River Stour to the south-west. In 1331, a chapel dedicated to St Catherine was described as being "newly built on the hill of Richesdon".

Older documents refer to an unlicensed chapel dedicated to St Leonard at Rishton, but there is some debate as to whether this was the same place, and therefore, whether the hill was the site of a former chapel. St Catherine's Hill has also been known locally as Kattern's Hill and this has prompted speculation that the hill and chapel are linked to a Pagan deity.

== History ==
Animal remains from before the Last Glacial Period have been discovered on the hill, though much of the gravel that covers the area was deposited by fast moving melting ice and it is possible some remains were washed there. Large numbers of Mesolithic and a few Paleolithic tools have been found there and across the local area, including a flint knapping site at nearby Ramsdown Hill. The presence of long barrows in the adjacent Stour valley shows Neolithic people were using the area but there is no direct evidence they visited the hill. There are however, Bronze Age tumuli over all three hills including St Catherine's and agricultural sites in the valley below from both the Neolithic and Bronze Age. There is also an unexcavated enclosure on top of the hill which is considered too small to be a fort and is thought to be an Iron Age animal pound.

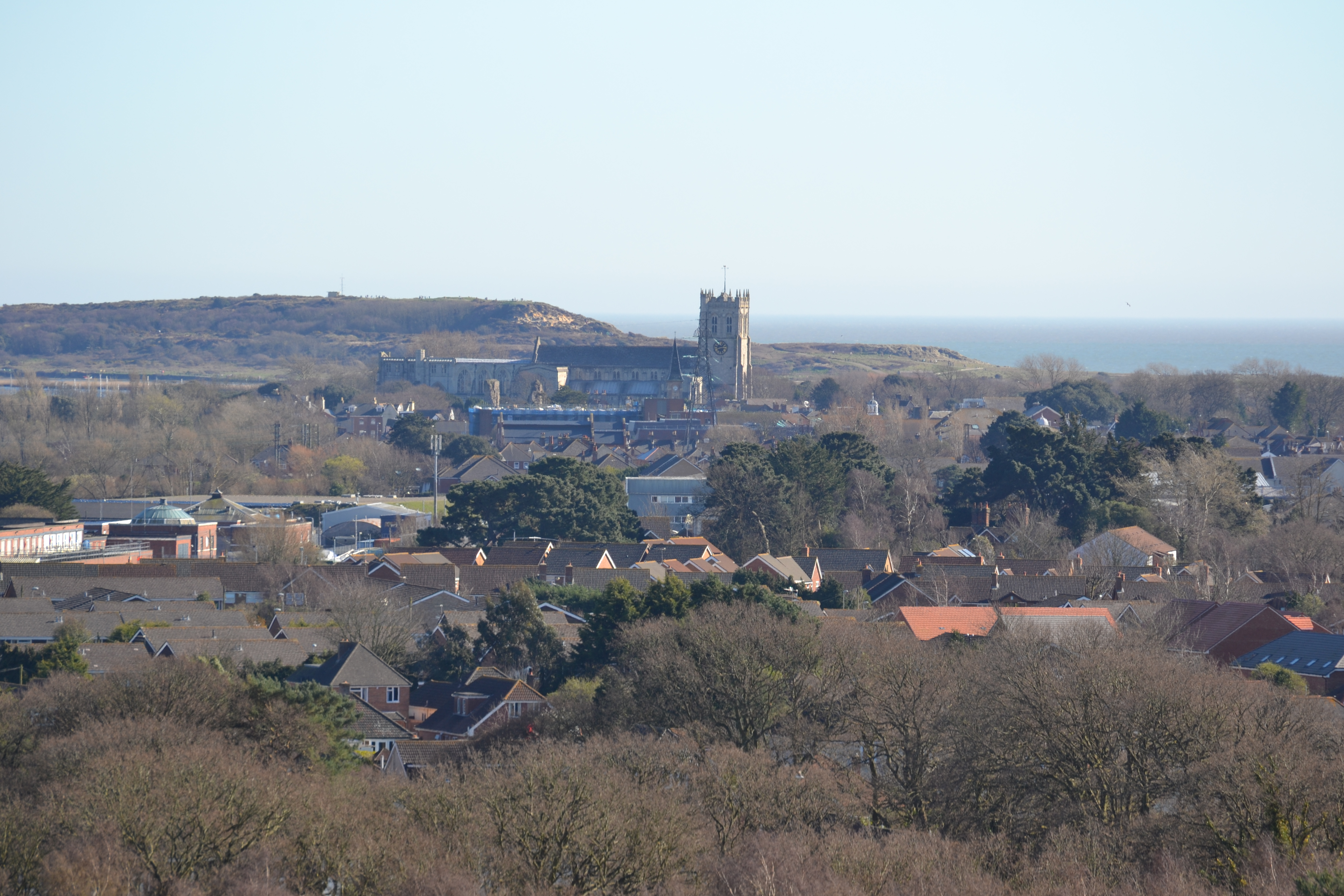
View over Christchurch towards Hengistbury Head

The earliest evidence of its use as such is Roman, but it is likely that the hill was used as a lookout post earlier. Christchurch Harbour was an important trading port in the Iron Age and through the Saxon and Roman periods; and the hill overlooks the Avon and Stour rivers, both navigable, until the 18th century, as far as Salisbury and Blandford respectively. Fragments of Roman pottery have been found in a ditch, which appears to be part of a fortification or signal station overlooking the main road from Christchurch to Wimborne and an important fording point on the Stour. From a simple wooden tower, the River Avon, the harbour and Hengistbury Head would have been viewable here.

A chapel was built within the boundaries of the old Roman signal station. Though it is not definitely known when it was constructed, a document from 1331 states that a chapel dedicated to St Catherine was "newly built on the hill of Richesdon". This appears to have been granted without the knowledge of the Bishop of Winchester, John de Stratford, who prohibited regular services being held there until the matter had been fully investigated. The following year, permission was given for weekly divine services. The chapel is believed to have fallen out of use after the dissolution of Christchurch Priory in 1539 and was stripped of any usable building material.

The chapel site was investigated in 1921 by The Bournemouth Natural Science Society, with guidance from Heyward Sumner. Fragments of Purbeck stone, stone roof tiles and glazed floor tiles were found in exploratory trenches, but no hewn stone nor foundations were revealed. The society concluded that there had been a substantial building on-site, but the usable material had been removed and it was not possible to determine size or form. A more thorough excavation took place in 1967. The Bournemouth Archaeological Association directed by Michael Ridley, found a number of artefacts, including an ichthys drawn on a piece of stone, glazed and unglazed pottery, and some shards of mediaeval coloured glass. They also discovered two types of flooring, a glazed tile floor and an earlier marble one, along with seven types of building stone and eight different roof tiles, suggesting that the chapel had stood for a considerable amount of time. The hill was initially chosen as the site for Christchurch Priory. A local legend tells how the church was then built at its present location, after the building materials were moved there each night.

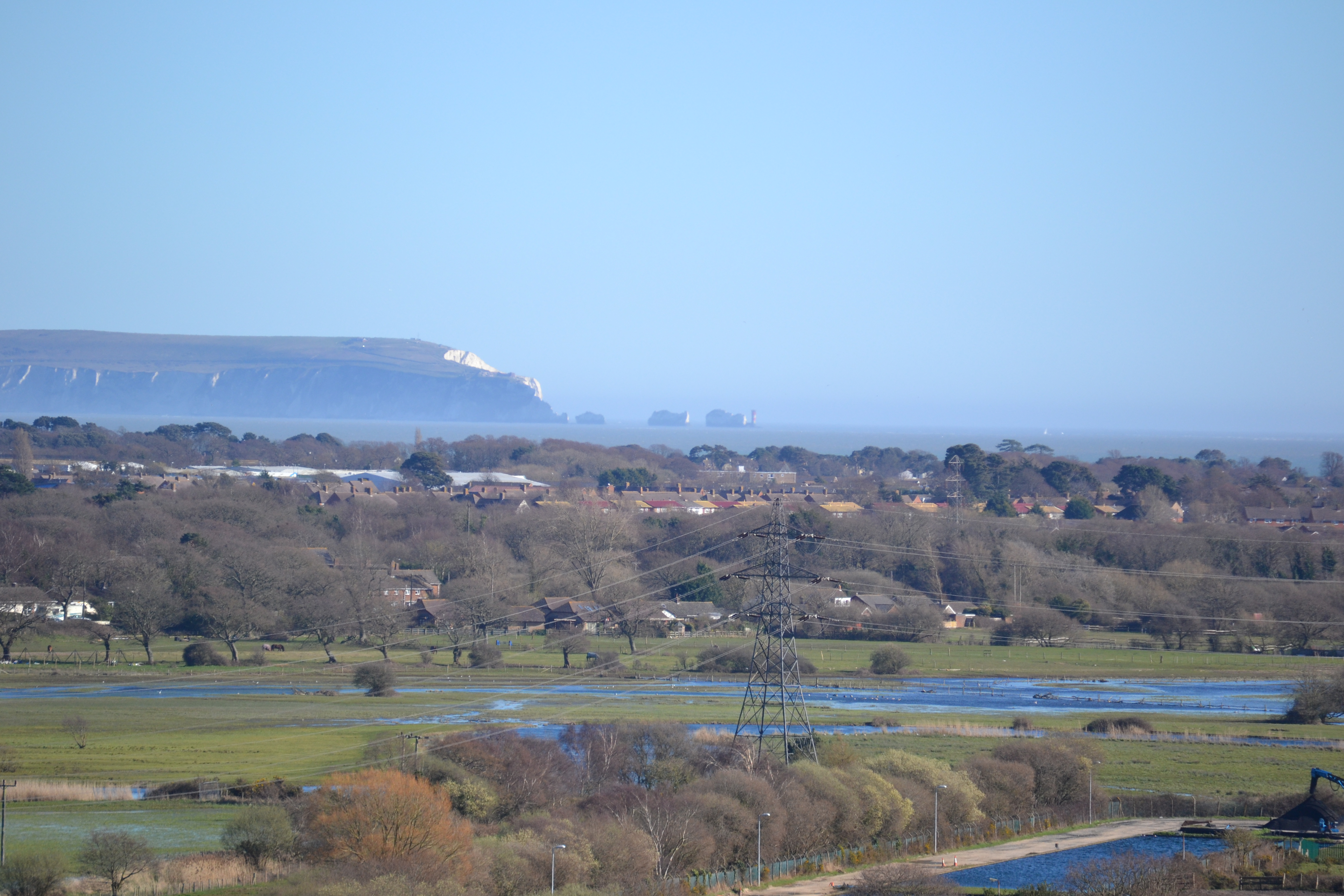
Across the Avon Valley to the Solent, Isle of Wight and the Needles. As seen from St Catherine's Hill

In Tudor times the hill was classified as a Coast Hill Beacon, meaning it had two fire baskets. Shore Beacons, such as nearby Warren Hill, had three fire baskets while those inland had one. It is possible that the beacons were lit to warn of the approaching Spanish Armada. The hill continued to be used for beacons throughout the Napoleonic Era when an invasion by the French was expected. The military has made use of the hill for training purposes. During the Crimean War, when a battalion of the Royal Horse Artillery was stationed at Christchurch Barracks, the hill was used for training in the pulling and unlimbering of guns on rough terrain.

=== 20th century onwards ===
During World War I a complete set of trenches were built on the hill including firing, communication and second line trenches, with observation and machine gun posts, dressing stations, latrines, mine shafts, and various rooms and strong points. Soldiers were trained in trench warfare and construction there prior to being sent to Flanders. The area was used during the Second World War, for tank driving practice. Anti-aircraft guns were positioned there to protect the aerodrome at Hurn. After the war, the Royal Observer Corps built a nuclear bunker into the hill. It was designed so that a three-man team could survive within for up to three weeks whilst observing the effects of a nuclear blast. After closing in 1991 the ROC Post was filled in, with the only remaining feature being a single disused telegraph pole 15 yards (14 m) away.

In the early 20th century, sand and gravel extraction took place on part of the hill, such as on the east side of the plateau, where the whole of what was once Toothill has been removed. The remaining pit has become partly filled with water. Extraction continued until at least 1933, when a local newspaper complained that a tumulus was being sold off at a shilling a load. A reservoir was first constructed on the hill in 1895. It was rebuilt in 1930 and a second reservoir was added in 1960. The reservoirs provide Christchurch and West Hampshire with four million gallons of water. In the 1960s and 70s, most of the west side of the hill was developed for housing.

A survey conducted in 2012, showed that the hill was mainly used for leisure and educational activities, such as walking, jogging, cycling and horse riding. Dog walking in particular is popular with 70 per cent of visitors using it for this purpose. Though prohibited, there is also off-road quadbiking and motorcycling. A local branch of the Amphibian and Reptile Conservation group (ARC) manage an area of heath on the north and east sides of the hill, and is one of a number of groups that conduct guided walks around the hill and surrounding area; while on the south side, the local gun club practises target shooting in one of the old, disused quarries.

== Geography ==
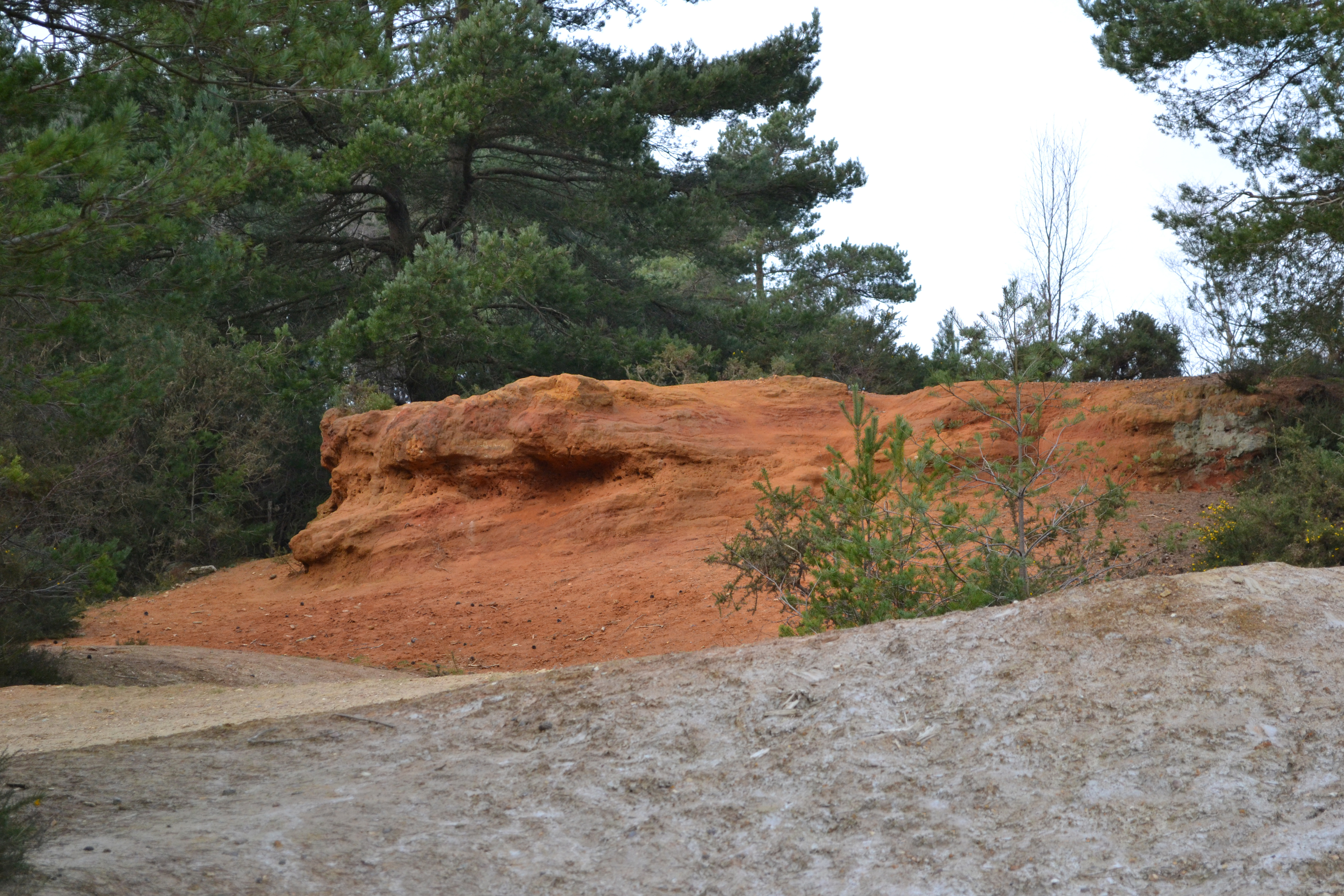
Quarrying on the hill has exposed its geological make up.

St Catherine's Hill, together with Ramsdown and Blackwater hills, comprise a 3-mile (4.8 km) long ridge running roughly north to south between the Avon and Stour valleys just to the north-west of where the rivers converge in the borough of Christchurch in Dorset. The top of this ridge is almost a level plateau, 45 metres (148 ft) above sea-level at the southern end and 49 metres (161 ft) in the north. St Catherine's hill, in the south, forms the highest point of this three hill chain at 53 metres (174 ft) and has some of the steepest slopes at 1:1 or 45°. The 400 acres (160 ha) site is a mixture of woodland and heath and is part of a larger Site of Special Scientific Interest (SSSI). The eastern slopes and foot of the hill, an area referred to as the Town Common, is almost exclusively open heath and as such has also been designated a Special Protection Area (SPA) and Special Area of Conservation (SAC).

St Catherine's Hill was formed during the Eocene and Pleistocene eras. The hilltop is covered with river terrace gravels, comprising mainly flints and coarse sands, on top of finer Branksome Sands below which is Parkstone Clay and the Poole Formation. A number of these strata can be observed at the old quarry works and are believed to have been deposited during a fluvial or estuarine period, rather than the more commonly associated, marine environment. If so, they are the only known sediments of this age in Southern England to be laid down in this way and indicate an Eocene shoreline between Christchurch and Hengistbury Head. These strata add to the value of the site as a geological SSSI.

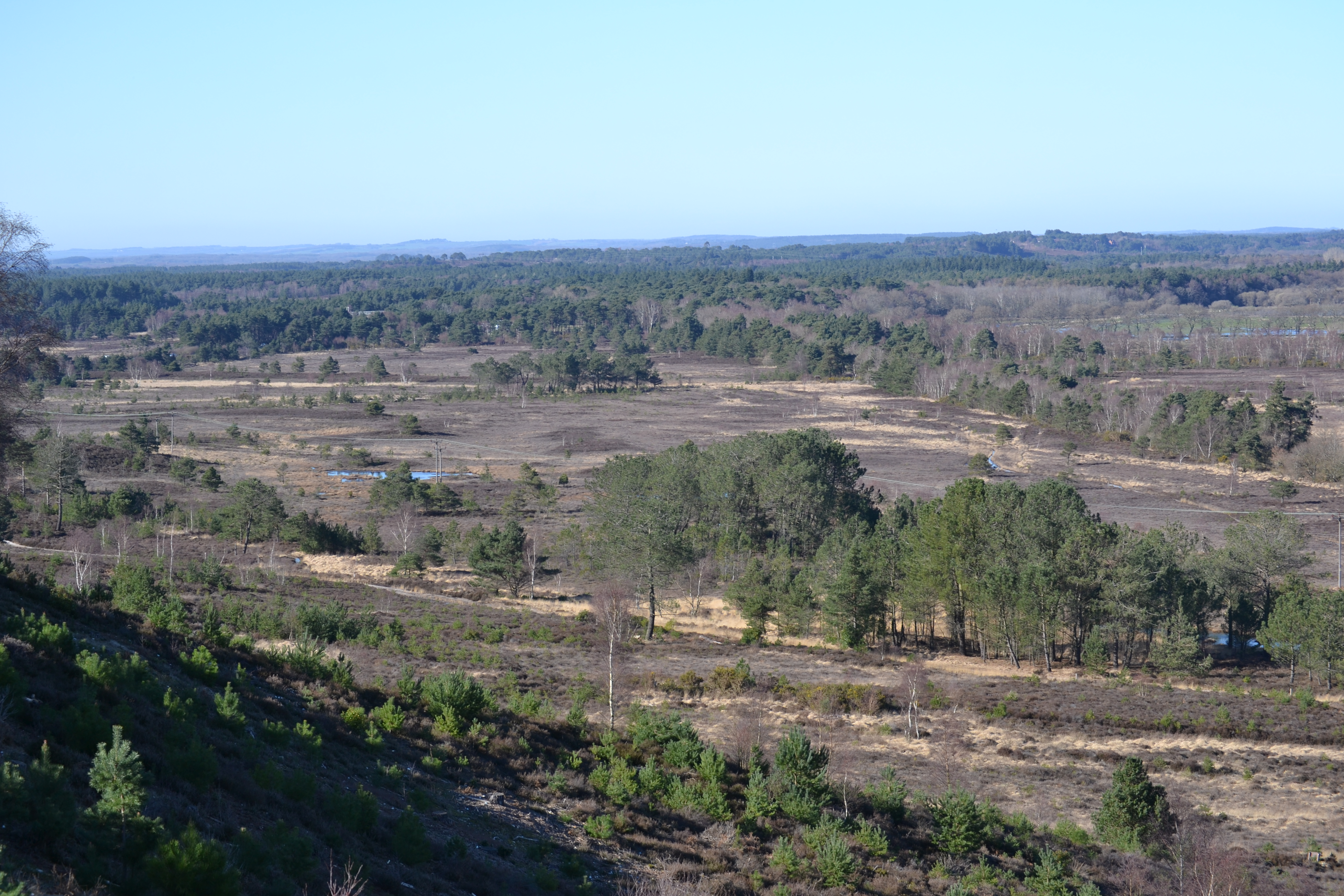
View over the heath covered eastern slopes and Town Common

The soils covering the hill and surrounding area are acidic and generally low in nutrients. These soils support a selection of habitats from wet and dry heathland, to deciduous and coniferous woodland and scrubland. Dry heath occurs mainly on the top of the hill, well above the water table, where there is good drainage. It is composed mainly of heather and dwarf shrubs but there are bare sandy areas where the rare mossy stonecrop (Crassula tillaea) is able to flourish. All six native species of reptile breed here including the endangered sand lizard (Lacerta agilis) and smooth snake (Coronella austriaca). The smooth snake is also found in the areas of wet heath which occur mainly at the foot of the hill and are created by seepage and flushes from below the hill's water table; and where free draining gravelly soils meet less permeable clay. Rare flora found in these areas include bog asphodel (Narthecium ossifragum), hare's-tail cotton-grass (Eriophorum vaginatum), bog moss (Sphagnum), the carnivorous sundews Drosera intermedia and Drosera rotundifolia, and pale butterwort (Pinguicula lusitanica).

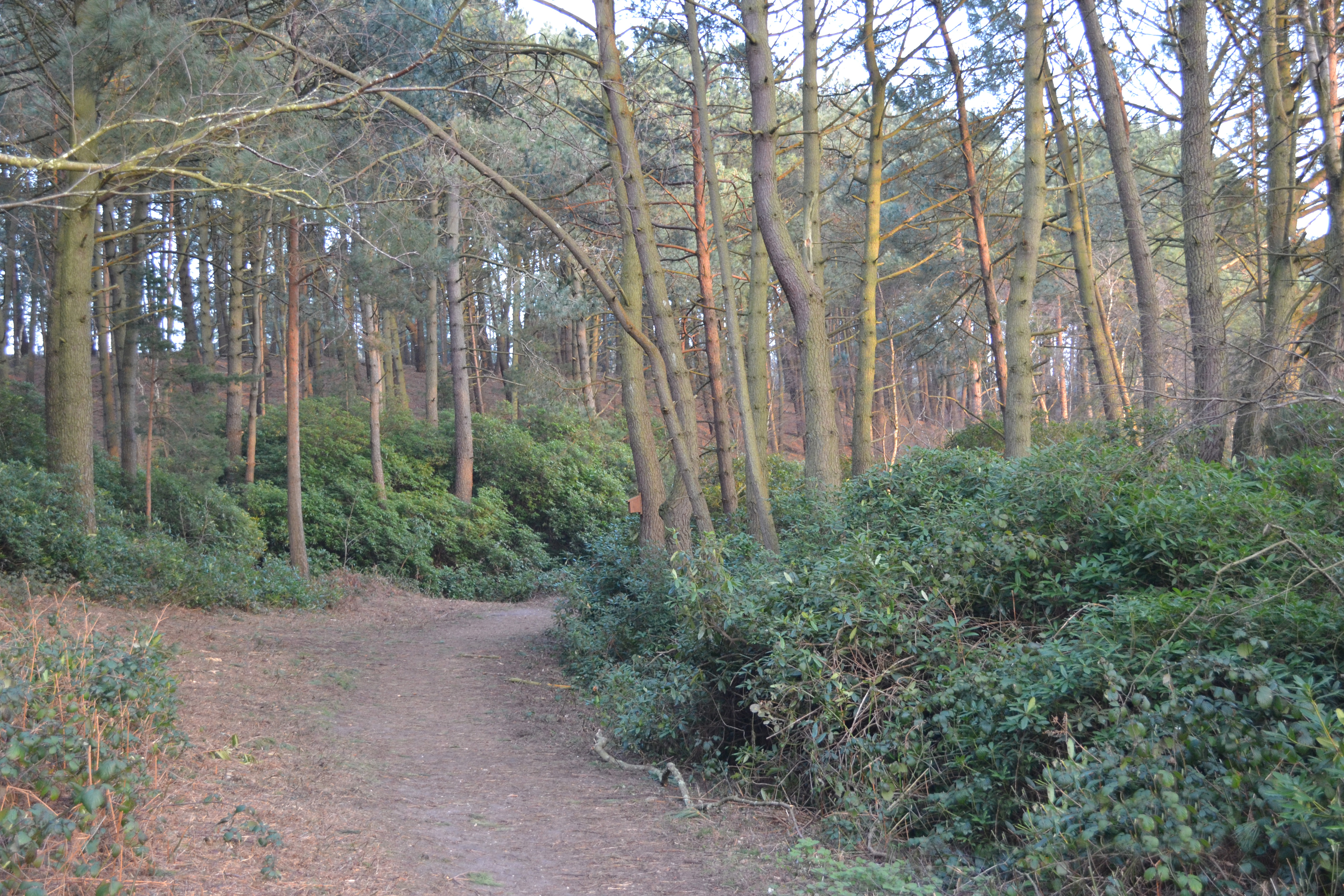
Conifers and Rhododendron dominate the western slopes.

Coniferous woodland dominates the top and western slopes of the hill and comprises mostly maritime and Scots pine. Broadleaf trees are mainly confined to the south and west side but also occur on the lower east side. They include grey willow and downy birch and the occasional aspen in damper areas. Some trees, particularly the conifers have become invasive and a programme of removal has been instigated. The hill's mix of woodland and heath provides habitats for a number of important bird species including birds of prey such as the hobby (Falco subbuteo), buzzard (Buteo buteo), hen harrier (Circus cyaneus) and merlin (Falco columbarius); woodland birds including the song thrush (Turdus philomelos), crossbill (Loxia curvirostra) and green (Picus viridus) and great spotted (Dendrocopos major) woodpeckers, all of which are declining in numbers; and wetland birds such as snipe and the red shank (Tringa totanus). Many of these species also use the area for breeding, along with the rare Dartford warbler (Sylvia undata), woodcock (Scolopax rusticola) and nightjar (Caprimulgus europaeus).

Some rare invertebrates inhabit the hill and its surrounding area. The scarce chaser (Libellula fulva), hairy dragonfly (Brachytron pratense) and downy emerald (Cordulia aenea) make use of the ponds in the wetter areas of the heath, while the heath grasshopper (Chorthippus vagans) is found on the sandy areas among the heather, along with the silver-studded blue butterfly (Plebejus argus).

== Bibliography ==
- Hodges, Michael A. (2005). St Catherine's Hill – A Short History. Christchurch: Natula Publications. ISBN 1-897-887-45-0.
- Hoodless, W.A. (2005). Hengistbury Head, The Whole Story. Poole Historical Trust. ISBN 978-1-873535-60-8.
- Stannard, Michael (1999). The Makers of Christchurch: A Thousand Year Story. Natula Publications. ISBN 1-897887-22-1.
- "St Catherine's Hill and Town Common Management Plan 2012–2023" (PDF). Bournemouth Christchurch Poole Council. Archived from the original (PDF) on 27 December 2021.
