= John and William Rufford =

John and William Rufford were English 14th century Bell founders. They were probably father and son and were the successive owners of a foundry in Toddington, Bedfordshire. Royal effigies appear on their bells. They were producing bells between 1353—1400.
