= Twynham =

Twynham was the original name of Christchurch, Dorset, in England, which was called Twynham until the end of the eleventh century.

It can also refer to:

- Frederick Twynham (1806–1868), English cricketer
- Gary Twynham (b. 1976), English footballer
- Twynham School in Christchurch
