= Listed buildings in Christchurch, Dorset =

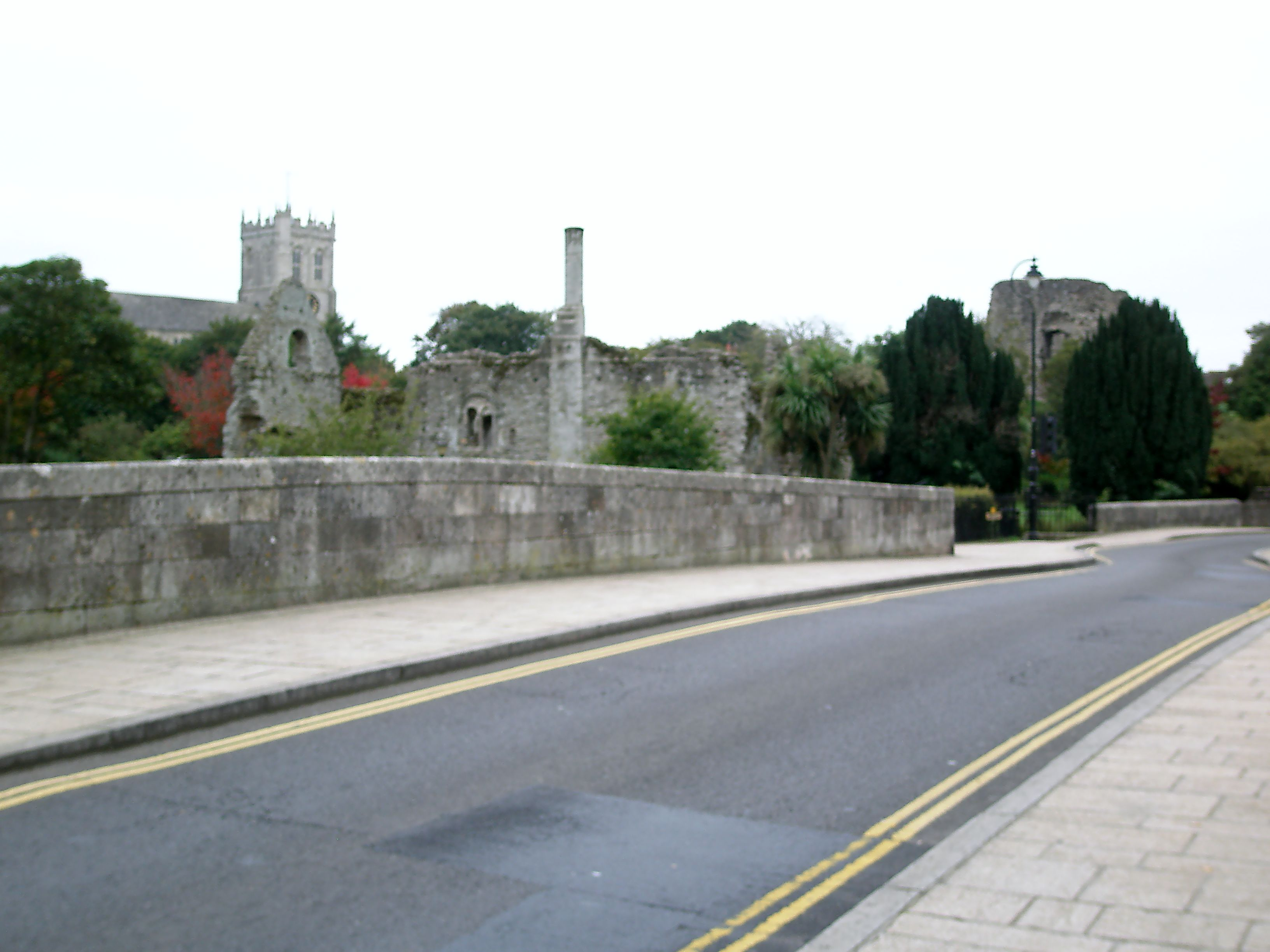
Five of the town's grade I listed structures. In the foreground, the mediaeval town and mews bridges; in the centre, the 12th-century Constable's House; in the background to the right, the Norman castle, and to the left, the Priory church.

Christchurch is a town and former borough in the county of Dorset on the English Channel coast, adjoining Bournemouth in the west, with the New Forest to the east. Historically in Hampshire, it joined Dorset with the reorganisation of local government in 1974 and is the most easterly borough in the county. Its close proximity to the Cotentin Peninsula made it an important trading port and a potential target for invasion during the Napoleonic and Second World Wars.

The borough has over 300 nationally listed buildings and structures, a sample of which are described below, and more than 200 locally listed.

In England, a building or structure is defined as "listed" when it is placed on a statutory register of buildings of "special architectural or historic interest" by the Secretary of State for Culture, Media and Sport, a Government department, in accordance with the Planning (Listed Buildings and Conservation Areas) Act 1990. English Heritage, a non-departmental public body, acts as an agency of this department to administer the process and advise the department on relevant issues. There are three grades of listing status: Grade I, defined as being of "exceptional interest"; Grade II*, "particularly important buildings of more than special interest"; and Grade II, used for buildings of "special interest".

Christchurch has seven structures of Grade I status, 12 listed at Grade II* and 316 of Grade II status. Three of the Grade I structures are bridges, one a church, one a Gothic mansion, one a Norman dwelling and one a Norman castle. Other structures given recognition by English Heritage include a Victorian pillar box, a 1935 telephone kiosk, a bandstand, a mausoleum (see below), a drinking fountain (see below), two entire graveyards, and two war memorials.

In addition the borough has 12 scheduled ancient monuments, three nationally important archaeological sites, 12 conservation areas and four sites of special scientific interest (SSSI). For more information on these, see the main articles Christchurch, Dorset, Stanpit Marsh and Christchurch Harbour.

== Listed buildings ==
Name	Image	Grade	Notes	Location
Christchurch Priory	Christchurch Priory	I	Christchurch town centre and the Harbour are overlooked by the 11th-century Christchurch Priory. Once a monastery, it was given to the town for use as a parish church by Henry VIII after the dissolution in 1540. It is the longest parish church in England with a nave over 311 feet long. The nave and transepts are Norman with heavy columns and round arches, whereas the lady chapel is from the 14th century and more 'Perpendicular' in style. The great choir is even later, having been rebuilt in the 16th century. The Priory is famous for its Miraculous Beam, which attracts pilgrims from all over the world. DoE Reference: 748/1/14	Christchurch, Priory Grounds. Grid Reference: SZ1600692523
Christchurch Castle		I	The castle ruins are of a motte and bailey construction and are of Norman origin or possibly even Saxon. It has been suggested that there may have been a castle on this spot as early as 924 AD when; after Aethelwold captured the town ramparts in 901 AD, Edward the Elder decided to fortify the town further with a wooden fort on a motte. After the Norman Conquest (1066) the castle's defences were again strengthened with the addition of a ditch and bailey surrounded by a wooden palisade. The wooden fort was replaced; at first with another wooden structure and then in 1300, with a stone keep. Today the bailey is home to a bowling green and gardens, and the ditch has been filled but parts of the keep and the constable's house still stand. DoE Reference: 1A/17	Christchurch, Castle Street. Grid Reference: SZ1596892661
The Constable's House		I	The Constable's House is a domestic Norman dwelling which was built within the original castle bailey in 1160, earlier than the existing stone keep. Much of the stonework survives, including a rare example of a Norman Chimney (one of only five in the country). The ground floor which has four slit windows was used as a storeroom. The upper floor accessed by steps outside and an internal staircase contained the main hall. As well as the chimney, another notable feature is the privy which extends out over the mill stream. DoE Reference: 1A/18	Christchurch, Castle Street. Grid Reference: SZ1605092706
The Town Bridge		I	This 15th-century ashlar bridge is sometimes referred to as Quartley's Bridge after Dr. Quartley whose house sits on a narrow strip of land between the Little Avon and the millstream. Dr. Quartley is associated with the town's smuggling folklore. The bridge crosses the narrower of the two branches of the Avon on what was, before the bypass was constructed, the only easterly route out of the town and the only crossing point below Sopley. It has five low, round headed arches with cutwaters between and parapet above. DoE Reference: 1A/19	Christchurch, Castle Street. Grid Reference: SZ1604092735
The Mews Bridge		I	Listed as the western part of the Town Bridge but separated by a narrow strip of land, this bridge is one of two mediaeval bridges that cross the mill stream. Built at the same time as the Town Bridge from the same materials, it has two 2 arches with a cutwater between and parapets. It has no documented name but is often referred to as the Mews bridge or sometimes also as Quartley's bridge. DoE Reference: 1A/19	Christchurch, Castle Street. Grid Reference: SZ1604092735
Waterloo Bridge		I	Waterloo Bridge crosses the wider of the two branches of the Avon on the same easterly route out of the town as the Town Bridge. Built circa 1816 but in the mediaeval tradition from dressed stone, with wide segmental arches, circular piers and capped cutwaters. DoE Reference: 1A/20	Christchurch, Bridge Street. Grid Reference: SZ1625692833
Highcliffe Castle		I	Highcliffe Castle was designed by William Donthorne for Charles Stuart, 1st Baron Stuart de Rothesay, and built between 1831 and 1835. It stands on the site of High Cliff, a Georgian mansion that had belonged to Charles Stuart's grandfather John Stuart, 3rd Earl of Bute. Arguably the most important remaining example of the romantic and picturesque style of architecture, Donothorne's design incorporated carved, mediaeval stonework and stained glass dating back to the 12th century. DoE Reference: 13/51	Highcliffe, Rothesay Drive. Grid Reference: SZ2030693208
Place Mill		II*	Place Mill is an Anglo-Saxon watermill mentioned in the Domesday Book. The mill stopped working in 1908 and stood derelict until it was restored in 1981. "It is remarkable, in that it takes water from one river and spills it into a second river". A mill-stream is supplied from the River Avon, near to the Electricity Museum behind Bargates, and flows for nearly half a mile to the mill between the Avon and the Priory grounds, before joining the River Stour at the Town Quay. DoE Reference: 1A/15	Christchurch, Town Quay. Grid Reference: SZ1600392392
The Red House Museum		II*	The second of the town's museums is The Red House Museum built in 1764 as the town workhouse. Many of the women and children that worked in the towns' fusee factories came from here. It contains a variety of exhibitions pertaining to local history, costume, geology, natural history and archaeology. In addition there are a number of temporary exhibitions that change every few weeks. The grounds contain both formal and informal gardens. DoE Reference: 1A/11. The boundary walls are grade II listed.	Christchurch, Quay Road. Grid Reference: SZ1588292570
Church Hatch		II*	Church Hatch is a red brick, Georgian house in Church Street. It was the home of Major-General Sir Owen Tudor Burne, renowned soldier and 3 times private secretary to the Viceroy of India. It was saved from demolition in 1929 by public appeal. DoE Reference: 1A/7 Another former resident was the taphephobic Mrs Perkins whose grade II listed mausoleum can be found in Priory Gardens at the rear of the property. The railings, gate and walls are also grade II* listed.	Christchurch, Church Street. Grid Reference: SZ1596892628
Priory Cottage		II*	Standing on the edge of Quay Road but within the priory grounds, is Priory Cottage. Mediaeval in origin, it was built as a porter's lodge and apart from the Priory itself; is the only monastic building to have survived the dissolution. It was restored by the last prior in the 16th century. DoE Reference: 1A/12	Christchurch, Priory Grounds. Grid Reference: SZ1596192502
Tyneham House		II*	Tyneham House is a two-storey, 18th-century stuccoed building with brick eaves and cornice. The house has a centre portion of three windows and advanced side wings with hipped roofs. The Doric porch in the centre has a three-light sash window to each side. There is a stone triglyph frieze and cornice over these windows and the door. It is supposed that the name of the house is a misspelling of the town's ancient name of Twynham, although there is a village of the same name in Dorset. DoE Reference: 1A/29	Christchurch, Bridge Street. Grid Reference: SZ1615292801
Burton Hall		II*	Burton Hall was built around 1750 as a 3-storey, private residence but has since been converted into flats. It is a fine example of a grand house from the period and has a stylish facade constructed from brick but with stone dressings. The centre breaks slightly forward and has pediment. Plain parapet and modillion cornice, rusticated quoins and brick stacks. Above the doorway is a pedimented window with a stone balustrade below and flanked by smaller windows. The centre, second-floor window has moulded stone architrave. There is a former orangery at the north end with 5 round arched windows. The interior still retains it large staircase, moulded architrave, six-panelled doors and 18th-century fireplaces. DoE Reference: 9/364	Burton, Salisbury Road. Grid Reference: SZ1654595192
No. 3 Bridge Street (Prezzo)		II*	Built in the early 19th century, this two-storey residence and shop front has a painted brick facade with eaves, cornice and slate roof. Two of the five windows on the first floor are bricked (as a way of avoiding paying the 1766 window tax), dating the building to pre 1851. The shop front on the ground floor has two bowed shop windows with glazing bars, flanking a centre double doorway with a wide, flat cornice overall. There is an additional round arched doorway with a fanlight to east of shop. DoE Reference: 1A/28	Christchurch, Bridge Street. Grid Reference: SZ1611692791
Mayor's Parlour		II	The Mayor's Parlour. Was originally built as the market hall in 1745 at the junction of Castle Street, Church Street and the High Street; it was moved to its present position in 1849. Later it was enclosed and extended, and used as the town hall until the civic offices were built, in Bridge Street, in the mid-1970s. It was partly demolished and restored to its former condition circa 1982 when Saxon Square was built. The Celtic cross in the square marks the back of the building before its demolition. DoE Reference: 1A/98	Christchurch, High Street. Grid Reference: SZ1579092835
The Congregational Church		II	Built on the site of an earlier Congregational church which dated from 1660, this church in Millhams Street was built in 1866 to a Kemp-Welch and Pinder design. Constructed from buff brick with stone dressings and a roof of patterned, two tone slates; the sizable church and attached Sunday school buildings are mainly Gothic in appearance but with a mixture of Romanesque and Cinquecento detail. The tall, slender, steeple has a splayed pyramid spire with a weather vane finial. Below this is a clock, then recessed belfry with triple round-arched windows, 3 portholes with 'quasi-tiled' roof of stone to cornice, a two light Cinquecento window and a round-arched doorway. The west front has a double arched entrance in a low gabled porch constructed from pink stone with colonnettes, foliage capitals and vermiculated keystones. Above is a 4-light round-arched window with tracery of roundels (1 cusped) and Lombard frieze to gable. The 2 storey side elevations have lower windows with shouldered flat-arched lights under segmental relieving arch and foliage tympanum. The upper windows are 2-light Cinquecento style under cross gables. The attached Sunday schools have a similar elevation and roof. It is now a United Reformed Church. DoE Reference: 1A/56. The associated graveyards on either side of the street are also grade II listed. DoE Reference: 1A/57	Christchurch, Millhams Street. Grid Reference: SZ1585392832
The Ship Hotel		II	The Ship Inn which has the oldest licence in Christchurch, was a known haunt of smugglers. There is a smugglers' cache on the roof between the pub and the old toll house next door (now a 'phone shop) which is only visible from an alleyway opposite. The facade is 19th-century but the building is much older. The Ship's history can be traced back to 1688. DoE Reference: 1A/95	Christchurch, High Street. Grid Reference: SZ1584492779
Ye Olde George Inne		II	Ye Olde George Inne is one of two listed public houses in the town centre. Originally called the George and Dragon, it was a coach house where the Emerald coach would stop on its way from Lymington to Poole. The old timber framed building was refaced with brick in the early 18th century, and some of the glazing dates back to the 19th century. DoE Reference: 1A/5	Christchurch, Castle Street. Grid Reference: SZ1590992724
The Perfumery/ Old Court House		II	The Perfumery is a 14th-century thatched property which is often referred to, and indeed listed as the old courthouse; although many local historians (including Michael A. Hodges and Sue Newman) maintain that this was next door and long gone. Nevertheless, as it is owned by the council, it can lay claim to being the oldest council house in the borough. The late mediaeval timber frame was refaced in both the 18th and 19th centuries. The first floor is jettied out and the gable end has elaborate, carved, bargeboards and beams. DoE Reference: 1A/24	Christchurch, Castle Street. Grid Reference: SZ1598092706
Priory House		II	Built within the Priory grounds, in 1777 by Gustavus Brander, a curator at the British Museum and a governor of the Bank of England. It is here that the future King of France (Prince Louis Phillipe) took refuge during the Napoleonic Wars. Brander is also known for his work with native fossils and for producing the first book on them. DoE Reference: 1A/13	Christchurch, Priory Grounds. Grid Reference: SZ1603592497
Place Mill Bridge.		II	This mediaeval bridge crosses the mill stream just before Place Mill, an Anglo-Saxon watermill on the Town Quay. Officially it has no name but is often referred to as the Place Mill Bridge. The oldest part of the bridge, the arches, date back to Saxon times. DoE Reference: 1A/16. Further upstream, by the town, is another mediaeval bridge which has a grade I listing.	Christchurch, Town Quay. Grid Reference: SZ1601892403
Ye Olde Eight Bells		II	Ye Olde Eight Bells is now a gift shop but once was another alehouse frequented by smugglers and central to a number of local legends. A date above the door suggests that the building dates back to 1450 AD. It was here that a young woman foiled a revenue search by sitting with a tub of brandy beneath her skirts, while she nursed a baby. It was also reported that there was a tunnel from the basement leading to the Ship in Distress at Stanpit, over a mile away. The name comes from the Priory peal which at the time was seven bells (it is now twelve) and thus was a joke along the same lines of the nineteenth hole on a golf course. It closed as a public house in 1907. Listed as No.16 Church Street. DoE Reference: 1A/8	Christchurch, Church Street. Grid Reference: SZ1594892606
Perkins' Mausoleum		II	A fear of being buried alive led the owner of this mausoleum to request that her body not be interred, nor her coffin lid screwed down, and that it should be placed at the entrance to the priory's school so that the pupils would hear if she revived. When her husband died 20 years later in 1803, her body was removed, the structure sold, and re-erected in Priory Gardens. DoE Reference: 1A/152	Christchurch, Priory Gardens. Grid Reference: SZ1607492614
The Old Power Station		II	Built in 1903 to power the town's trams, the power station in Bargates is one of the most complete, early power stations to have survived in England. It was constructed in the late Victorian Italianate style from red brick with stone and terracotta dressings. Now a Museum of Electricity, it houses a variety of educational exhibits and old machinery, including a tram. It is one of two museums in the town. DoE ref 491644	Christchurch, Bargates. Grid Reference: SZ1570393159
Hart's Factory		II	The old Fusee factory in Bargates. Was built in 1845 to an advanced design with particularly large windows on either side. 74 feet long but only 18 feet wide, it allowed the maximum amount of natural light to enter for the intricate assembly work that was carried out within.The two-storey building is constructed from red brick with grey headers and bears a slate roof. DoE ref 1/66 1A/66.	Christchurch, Bargates. Grid Reference: SZ1560692982
Bemister's Fountain		II	Bemister's fountain is a grade II listed drinking fountain and cattle trough erected to commemorate Samuel Bemister, a local businessman and mayor of Christchurch no less than 7 times. Constructed entirely of pink granite, the cattle trough sits on stone end blocks with heart-shaped niches in each. Below there are 3 smaller troughs for cats and dogs hollowed out from plinth. A short round column with a drinking fountain rises at one end from square base. This column is reminiscent of the town's power station chimney. It is this power station that Bemister supplied with coal brought from Southampton in his fleet of windjammers to the town quay. Built circa 1900 at the end of High St., it was moved to the quay when the bypass was built. It can now be found at the south end of Bargates close to its original site, now occupied by the Fountain Roundabout. 1A/441	Christchurch, Bargates. Grid Reference: SZ1570192457
HSBC Bank		II	Listed as No.15 (Midland Bank), as it then was, the HSBC bank in the High Street is an Edwardian Baroque building in white stone with a balustraded parapet to a roof which isn't visible from ground level. The rounded south eastern corner terminates in a dome, the base of which has low relief carving. It has 3 round arched windows on a plinth which are separated by engaged Tuscan pillars. The entrance below the dome has a draped blank plaque with swags above door and the doorway has dentil cornice, segmental canopy and stone architrave. DoE ref 1A/75.	Christchurch, High Street. Grid Reference: SZ1573592839
The King's Arms Hotel		II	The Kings Arms Hotel is a building in two parts. The western section was built in the 18th century as Humby's, on the site of a 17th-century inn of the same name. It housed the South Hants Militia until the barracks were built in 1794. This section, in painted brick, has a steeply pitched, slate roof with moulded eaves and cornice. Some of the sash windows have boxed frames and 19th-century glazing. The eastern section was built around 1800 with a brick facade with stucco plinth and a hipped bellcast slate roof, again with moulded wood eaves cornice. In the centre of the first floor are 3 lights with a stone pediment above, and with flanking pilasters. An iron balcony extends along the width of the first floor. The wide porch below has Tuscan columns and the door is flanked by narrow lights with a wide fanlight above. DoE ref 1A/26.	Christchurch, Castle Street. Grid Reference: SZ1597392769
Quartley's House		II	Quartley's is an early-19th-century, 3-storey, private residence with a slate roof with red ridge tiles and dormer. The restored, stucco facade has 5 sash windows with glazing bars and a 6-panelled double door with panelled reveals and a flat canopy on brackets. It is approached by a flight of railed steps and has iron area railings along the street boundary. DoE ref 1A/154.	Christchurch, Bridge Street. Grid Reference: SZ1604792750
The Cemetery Lodge		II	Designed by renowned architect Benjamin Ferrey, this 19th-century lodge at Jumpers' Cemetery is built in the form of a gatehouse from stone with ashlar dressings. The arched, off centre, gabled entrance crosses the road into cemetery. It is of an asymmetrical design of 1 and 1 1/2 storeys with a tiled roof. The entrance has a ground floor window with relieving arch above and gabled dormer. DoE Reference: 4/224. Benjamin Ferrey was born and lived in the town.	Christchurch, Jumpers Road. Grid Reference: SZ1462293703
The Two Chapels		II	Another of Ferrey's designs, the two chapels at Jumpers' Cemetery form a group with the lodge. Built at the same time from stone with tiled roofs, they face each other across the roadway. Lacking towers, each has a bellcotte. Often referred to as the twin chapels, although similar, there are differences, as the accompanying picture demonstrates. DoE Reference: 4/243.	Christchurch, Jumpers Road. Grid Reference: SZ1459893720
Sandhills		II	Sandhills was the holiday home of Sir George Rose, Member of Parliament and close friend and advisor to the prime minister William Pitt. It was built on the beach at Mudeford and Sir George's other great friend, King George III stayed there on a number of occasions, helping to promote Christchurch as a tourist destination. Sandhills, Mudeford was also home to George Rose's two sons: Sir George Henry Rose, politician and diplomat, and William Rose, poet. Field Marshal Hugh Rose, 1st Baron Strathnairn, GCB, GCSI, son of George Henry Rose also spent time living at the family home. Sandhills is now a holiday park with static caravans in the grounds but the house still remains although it has been converted to flats. DoE Reference: 6/41	Mudeford, Bure Lane. Grid Reference: SZ1855391973
Gundimore		II	Gundimore is a house near Avon Beach built in 1796 for the poet William Rose. Visitors to the house included fellow poets Coleridge and Southey. Sir Walter Scott stayed there while writing his epic poem Marmion. The building is of the most unusual design, said to have been built in the shape of a Turkish tent, complete with gilt Arabic inscriptions to remind the original owner of his travels in the east. It consisted of a centre section and 2 wings. The centre section has 5 windows with a large curved centre bay with a shallow pitched, conical roof. At the south west corner of this bay is a round, 2 storey turret, shaped like a squat house with the upper storey almost completely glazed. The north eastern wing is now Scott's Cottage. Rose is believed to have designed at least part of the house himself. DoE Reference: 3/42.	Mudeford, Bure Lane. Grid Reference: SZ1872392070
The Dutch Cottages		II	The cottages on Mudeford Quay were originally built for workers involved with the dredging of the harbour and the Avon during the 17th century. Part of the group of cottages later became the Haven Inn, now known as the Dutch House which was the main focus in the Battle of Mudeford. The current Haven House tavern is an impostor dating back only a 150 years or so. DoE Reference: 6/43.	Mudeford, Mudeford Quay. Grid Reference: SZ1830891742

== Listed buildings not featured in the main article ==
=== Grade II* ===
- The gates and railings of the Priory churchyard, Church Street, Christchurch. DoE Reference: 1A/123 Grid Reference: SZ1597192608.
- Greystones, Waterford Road, Highcliffe. DoE Reference: 13/60. Grid Reference: SZ2165493390.
- The Moorings, Bure Lane, Mudeford. DoE Reference: 3/40. Grid Reference: SZ1828692064.
- Hurn Court, Hurn Court Lane, Hurn. DoE Reference: 8/350. Grid Reference: SZ1214895935.

=== Grade II ===
- Tole Cottage, Avon Causeway, Sopley. DoE ref 8/335. Grid Reference: SZ1444297567.
- Nos 1 & 2 Riverside Cottages plus adjoining building, Avon Causeway, Hurn. DoE ref 8/339. Grid Reference: SZ1272497008.
- No 21 Bargates, Christchurch. DoE ref 1A/72. Grid Reference: SZ1569492984.
- No 22 Bargates, Christchurch. DoE ref 1A/67 4/67. Grid Reference: SZ1561993005.
- No 24 Bargates, Christchurch. DoE ref 4/249.Grid Reference: SZ1560293009
- (The old) Iford Bridge, Barrack Road, Christchurch. DoE ref 5/48. Grid Reference: SZ1380193598.
- No 20 Barrack Road, Christchurch. DoE ref 1/46. Grid Reference: SZ1558392881.
- Cottage at Bockhampton farm, Bockhampton Road, Middle Bockhampton. DoE ref 9/398. Grid Reference: SZ1758296698.
- The pump south of cottage, Bockhampton Road, Middle Bockhampton. DoE ref 9/397. Grid Reference: SZ1759096687.
- Farmhouse at Bockhampton, Bockhampton Road, Middle Bockhampton. DoE ref 9/399. Grid Reference: SZ1752696706.
- The Granary at Bockhampton, Bockhampton Road, Middle Bockhampton. DoE ref 9/396. Grid Reference: SZ1765696644.
- The North Barn at Bockhampton farm, Bockhampton Road, Middle Bockhampton. DoE ref 9/400. Grid Reference: SZ1753196656.
- The South Barn at Bockhampton farm, Bockhampton Road, Middle Bockhampton. DoE ref 9/395. Grid Reference: SZ1761596630.
- The farmhouse at Fir Grove Farm, Boundary Lane, Hurn. DoE ref 10/401. Grid Reference: SU1066000166.
- No 30 Bridge Street, Christchurch. DoE ref 1A/162. Grid Reference: SZ1619492822.
- No 10 Bridge Street, Christchurch. DoE ref 1A/435. Grid Reference: SZ1611692791.
- No 18 Bridge Street, Christchurch. DoE ref 1A/160. Grid Reference: SZ1615292801.
- No 2 Bridge Street, Christchurch. DoE ref 1A/155 Grid Reference: SZ1626192844.
- The facade of No 20 Bridge Street, Christchurch. DoE ref 1A/161. Grid Reference: SZ1616492798.
- No 24 Bridge Street, Christchurch. DoE ref 1A/437. Grid Reference: SZ1617692810.
- No 38 Bridge Street, Christchurch. DoE ref 1A/167 Grid Reference: SZ1627792848.
- No 4 Bridge Street, Christchurch. DoE ref 1A/157 Grid Reference: SZ1609492783.
- No 40 Bridge Street, Christchurch. DoE ref 1A/168 Grid Reference: SZ1628992850.
- No 40a Bridge Street, Christchurch. DoE ref 1A/438 Grid Reference: SZ1628992850.
- No 48 Bridge Street, Christchurch. DoE ref 2/173 Grid Reference: SZ1630992856.
- No 50 Bridge Street, Christchurch. DoE ref 2/174 Grid Reference: SZ1631692860.
- Nos 12 & 14 Bridge Street, Christchurch. DoE ref 1A/159 Grid Reference: SZ1611992808.
- Nos 32 & 34 Bridge Street, Christchurch. DoE ref 1A/30 Grid Reference: SZ1620092823.
- Nos 6 & 8 Bridge Street, Christchurch. DoE ref 1A/ 158 Grid Reference: SZ1610392790.
- No 1 Bridge Street, Christchurch. DoE ref 1A/166 Grid Reference: SZ1611692740
- No 23 Bridge Street, Christchurch. DoE ref 1A/164 Grid Reference: SZ1623092808.
- Nos 5 & 7 Bridge Street, Christchurch. DoE ref 1A/165 Grid Reference: SZ1612192767.
- The gates and piers at Bure Homage Lodge, Bure Lane, Mudeford. DoE ref 3/241 Grid Reference: SZ1883892816.
- Bure Homage Lodge, Bure Lane, Mudeford. DoE ref 3/240 Grid Reference: SZ1882692803.
- Brook Cottage, Burley Road, North Bockhampton. DoE ref 9/387 Grid Reference: SZ1668196466.
- Crumble Cottage, No 40 Burley Road, North Bockhampton. DoE ref 9/389 Grid Reference: SZ1748697233.
- Wings, Burley Road, Winkton. DoE ref 9/386 Grid Reference: SZ1630196158.
- The Thatched Cottage, (North side) Burley Road, Winkton. DoE ref 9/385 Grid Reference: SZ1622396118.
- Marigold Cottage, Burley Road, North Bockhampton. DoE ref 9/390 Grid Reference: SZ1724697070.
- No 5 Burley Road, Winkton. DoE ref 9/378 Grid Reference: SZ1620196079.
- The White Cottage, No 7 Burley Road, Winkton. DoE ref 9/380 Grid Reference: SZ1621496086.
- Peppercorn Cottage, Burton Road, Somerford. DoE ref 6/276 Grid Reference: SZ1711593666.
- No 12 Castle Street, Christchurch. DoE ref 1A/101 Grid Reference: SZ1596392731.
- No 18 Castle Street, Christchurch. DoE ref 1A/25 Grid Reference: SZ1597392769.
- No 20 Castle Street, Christchurch. DoE ref 1A/153 Grid Reference: SZ1603692747
- The railings at Quartley's, No22 Castle Street, Christchurch. DoE ref 1A/154 Grid Reference: SZ1604792750.
- Nos 14 & 16 Castle Street, Christchurch. DoE ref 1A/100 Grid Reference: SZ1596992735.
- Nos 2 & 4 Castle Street, Christchurch. DoE ref 1A/110 Grid Reference: SZ1593292730.
- Nos 6 & 6a Castle Street, Christchurch. DoE ref 1A/111 Grid Reference: SZ1594192731.
- No 1 Castle Street, Christchurch. DoE ref 1A/23 Grid Reference: SZ1593592702.
- No 3 Castle Street, Christchurch. DoE ref 1A/117 Grid Reference: SZ1594592700.
- No 5 Castle Street, Christchurch. DoE ref 1A/116 Grid Reference: SZ1595392701.
- No 7 Castle Street, Christchurch. DoE ref 1A/115 Grid Reference: SZ1596192703.
- No 9 Castle Street, Christchurch. DoE ref 1A/114 Grid Reference: SZ1596992700.
- Signboard of King's Arms Hotel, Castle Street, Christchurch. DoE ref 1A/113 Grid Reference: SZ1600192719.
- Yew Cottage, No 29 Chewton Common Road, Chewton Common, Highcliffe. DoE ref 14/442 Grid Reference: SZ2158994028.
- Heath Cottage, No 33 Chewton Common Road, Chewton Common, Highcliffe. DoE ref 13/416 Grid Reference: SZ2157293994.
- Little Megs, No 35 Chewton Common Road, Chewton Common, Highcliffe. DoE ref 13/418 Grid Reference: SZ2156494002.
- No 35a Chewton Common Road, Chewton Common, Highcliffe. DoE ref 13/419 Grid Reference: SZ2156494002.
- Little Thatch, No 39 Chewton Common Road, Chewton Common, Highcliffe. DoE ref 14/424 Grid Reference: SZ2145794032.
- The Cottage, No 45 Chewton Common Road, Chewton Common, Highcliffe. DoE ref 14/425 Grid Reference: SZ2140294034.
- No 1 Church Lane, Christchurch. DoE ref 1A/133 Grid Reference: SZ1585292582.
- Candlemas Cottage, No 12 Church Lane, Christchurch. Haunted. Two reports of reflections of fire being seen in windows of back upstairs room. Two reports of reflections of fire being seen in windows of back upstairs room. DoE ref 1A/127 Grid Reference: SZ1592192630.
- No 9 Church Lane, Christchurch. DoE ref 1A/130 Grid Reference: SZ1590592624.
- Nos 10 & 11 Church Lane, Christchurch. DoE ref 1A/129 Grid Reference: SZ1591392628.
- Nos 2 & 3 Church Lane, Christchurch. DoE ref 1A/131 Grid Reference: SZ1586692602.
- Nos 4, 6, 7 and 8 Church Lane, Christchurch. DoE ref 1A1/10 Grid Reference: SZ1589792615.
- No 1 Church Street, Christchurch. DoE ref 1A/118 Grid Reference: SZ1593592702.
- No 10 Church Street, Christchurch. DoE ref 1A/121 Grid Reference: SZ1596092639.
- No 11 Church Street, Christchurch. DoE ref 1A/122 Grid Reference: SZ1595492635.
- No 12 Church Street, Christchurch. DoE ref 1A/6 Grid Reference: SZ1596092639.
- No 2 Church Street, Christchurch. DoE ref 1A/119 Grid Reference: SZ1592992695.
- No 3 & 3a Church Street, Christchurch. DoE ref 1A/120 Grid Reference: SZ1593492691.
- Nos 14 & 16 (including wall lamp) Church Street, Christchurch. DoE ref 1A/8 Grid Reference: SZ1594892606.
- Christchurch trolleybus turntable, Church Street, Christchurch. DoE ref 1A/128 Grid Reference: SZ1591192648.
- Boundary wall to the Garden of Remembrance, Church Street, Christchurch. DoE ref 1A/149 Grid Reference: SZ1605092567.
- Boundary Walls to Priory Gardens, Church Street, Christchurch. DoE ref 1A/151 Grid Reference: SZ1603792606.
- Sundial in Priory Churchyard, Priory Grounds, Christchurch. DoE ref 1A/150 Grid Reference: SZ1599692602
- The Priory Ruins Priory Grounds, Christchurch. DoE ref 1A/147 Grid Reference: SZ1595392424.
- Nos 3 to 7 Cranemoor Avenue, Highcliffe. DoE ref 8/348 Grid Reference: SZ1144897039.
- Former farm house at Dudmoor Farm, Dudmoor Farm Road, Christchurch. DoE ref 9/384 Grid Reference: SZ1500296019.
- Milestone, Fairmile Road, DoE ref 4/248 Grid Reference: SZ1509193913.
- Dales House, Dales Lane, Hurn. DoE ref 8/348 Grid Reference: SZ1144897039.
- Holywell Cottage, Footners Lane, Burton. DoE ref 6/315 Grid Reference: SZ1658694793.
- Boundary wall at the entrance to No 7, Footners Lane, Burton. DoE ref 6/312 Grid Reference: SZ1659994746.
- No 17 Footners Lane, Burton. DoE ref 6/313 Grid Reference: SZ1659294752.
- Boundary wall at No 17, Footners Lane, Burton. DoE ref 6/314 Grid Reference: SZ1659294752.
- Tally Ho, Hawthorn Road, South Bockhampton. DoE ref 9/394 Grid Reference: SZ1751996002.
- Nos 42 & 44, High Street, Christchurch. DoE ref 1A/92 Grid Reference: SZ1584192804.
- Nos 72 & 74, High Street, Christchurch. DoE ref 1A/88 Grid Reference: SZ1589792737.
- Nos 76 & 76a, High Street, Christchurch. DoE ref 1A/87 Grid Reference: SZ1590392729.
- The Bow House, No 11 High Street, Christchurch. DoE ref 1A/3 Grid Reference: SZ1572892864.
- The Old Masonic Lodge, walls and railings. No 27 High Street, Christchurch. DoE ref 1A/2 Grid Reference: SZ1577792801.
- No 29 High Street, Christchurch. DoE ref 1A/1 Grid Reference: SZ1579192782.
- No 43 High Street, Christchurch. DoE ref 1A/81 Grid Reference: SZ1582092767.
- Nos 55, 55a and 55b High Street, Christchurch. DoE ref 1A/65 Grid Reference: SZ1584692739.
- The Nat West, 57, 57a and 57b High Street, Christchurch. DoE ref 1A/83 Grid Reference: SZ1585492726.
- Nos 59 & 61, High Street, Christchurch. DoE ref 1A/84 Grid Reference: SZ1586492719.
- Nos 63, 63a, 65 and 65a High Street, Christchurch. DoE ref 1A/85 Grid Reference: SZ1587492714.
- The rear garden wall at No 29, High Street, Christchurch. DoE ref 1A/79 Grid Reference: SZ1577692760.
- Walls in Druitt Gardens, High Street, Christchurch. DoE ref 1A/78 Grid Reference: SZ1570092751.
- Milestone at junction with Hoburne Lane, Highcliffe Road, Hoburne. DoE ref 6/439 Grid Reference: SZ1898993508.
- The Ice House at Hurn Court (formerly Heron Court), Hurn Court Lane, Hurn. DoE ref 8/349 Grid Reference: SZ1196096161.
- The Stable Block at Hurn Court, Hurn Court Lane, Hurn. DoE ref 8/352 Grid Reference: SZ1214695934.
- The courtyard walls at Hurn Court, Hurn Court Lane, Hurn. DoE ref 8/351 Grid Reference: SZ1220695956.
- The enclosed garden walls at Hurn Court, Hurn Court Lane, Hurn. DoE ref 8/353 Grid Reference: SZ1214095790.
- Nos 1 & 2 Blackwater, Hurn Road, Hurn. DoE ref 8/354 Grid Reference: SZ1358795912.
- No 4 Blackwater, Hurn Road, Hurn. DoE ref 8/355 Grid Reference: SZ1348995956.
- No 5 Blackwater Hurn Road, Hurn. DoE ref 8/356 Grid Reference: SZ1347495968.
- Nos 6 to 8 Blackwater, Hurn Road, Hurn. DoE ref 8/357 Grid Reference: SZ1337196070.
- The boundary wall to the cemetery, Jumpers Road, Christchurch. DoE Ref 4/242 Grid Reference: SZ1459993652.
- The Lodge, Jumpers Cemetery, Jumpers Road, Christchurch. DoE Ref 4/224 Grid Reference: SZ1462293703.
- The Twin Chapels, Jumpers Cemetery, Jumpers Road, Christchurch. DoE Ref 4/243 Grid Reference: SZ1459893720.
- Latch Farmhouse, Knapp Mill Avenue, Christchurch. DoE Ref 4/247 Grid Reference: SZ1527993855.
- The lychgate at the Parish Church of St. Marks, Lymington Road, Highcliffe. DoE Ref 13/42 Grid Reference: SZ2053093508.
- The milestone at the junction of Chewton Farm Road, Lymington Road, Highcliffe. DoE Ref 7/325 Grid Reference: SZ2209393981.
- The milestone at the end of the drive to St. Marks, Lymington Road, Highcliffe. DoE Ref 13/414 Grid Reference: SZ2057193419.
- St. Marks CoE Primary School, 245 & 246 Lymington Road, Highcliffe. DoE Ref 13/410 Grid Reference: SZ2101393540.
- Parish Church of St. Marks, Lymington Road, Highcliffe. DoE Ref 13/415 Grid Reference: SZ2056093519.
- The war memorial in the churchyard of St. Marks, Lymington Road, Highcliffe. DoE Ref 13/413 Grid Reference: SZ2051293572.
- The former boundary wall of Highcliffe Castle, Lymington Road, Highcliffe. DoE Ref 748/13/407 Grid Reference: SZ2025293401.
- The former lodge to Highcliffe Castle, No 179 Lymington Road, Highcliffe. DoE Ref 13/408 Grid Reference: SZ2055593395.
- No 181, gate post and railings, Lymington Road, Highcliffe. DoE Ref 13/409 Grid Reference: SZ2057693402.
- Chewton Bridge, Lymington Road, Highcliffe. DoE Ref 748/13/100 Grid Reference: SZ2234293853.
- The Rest, Marsh Lane, Christchurch. DoE Ref 5/264 Grid Reference: SZ1464294646.
- The White House, Marsh Lane, Christchurch. DoE Ref 5/263 Grid Reference: SZ1459694670.
- Lark Cottage, Martins Hill Lane, Burton. DoE Ref 6/308 Grid Reference: SZ1675094399.
- The Thatch, Martins Hill Lane, Burton. DoE Ref 6/306 Grid Reference: SZ1675594401.
- Wooland, Martins Hill Lane, Burton. DoE Ref 6/307 Grid Reference: SZ1675194400.
- West Quartleys, Martins Hill Lane, Burton. DoE Ref 6/309 Grid Reference: SZ1675394385.
- Barn at Merritown Farmhouse, Merritown Lane, Hurn. Grid DoE Ref 8/346 Grid Reference: SZ1097897218.
- Merritown Farmhouse, Merritown Lane, Hurn. DoE Ref 8/347 Grid Reference: SZ1102497230.
- Mill House, Mill Lane, Hurn. DoE Ref 7/53 Grid Reference: SZ2206293625.
- Nos 32 to 38 Millhams Street, Christchurch. DoE Ref 1A/102 Grid Reference: SZ1594192790.
- Nos 4 & 5 Millhams Street, Christchurch. DoE Ref 1A/22 Grid Reference: SZ1591292842.
- The Cottage, Millhams Street, Christchurch. DoE Ref 1A/60 Grid Reference: SZ1590292868.
- The Old Malthouse, Millhams Street, Christchurch. DoE Ref 1A/61 Grid Reference: SZ1593992761.
- The Olde Barne, Millhams Street, Christchurch. DoE Ref 1A/109 Grid Reference: SZ1594592750.
- Both graveyards of the URC Church, either side of Millhams Street, Christchurch. DoE Ref 1A/57 Grid Reference: SZ1588892809.
- The URC Church and attached Sunday School buildings, Millhams Street, Christchurch. DoE Ref 1A/56 Grid Reference: SZ1585392832.
- Church of All Saints, Mudeford. DoE Ref 3/239 Grid Reference: SZ1813092179.
- The Granary at Mudeford Farm, Mudeford. DoE Ref 3/238 Grid Reference: SZ1824792167.
- The Avonmouth Hotel, Mudeford. DoE Ref 3/39 Grid Reference: SZ1807892118.
- Dunkinty House, Mudeford. DoE Ref 2/55 Grid Reference: SZ1792692095.
- The gate piers and boundary walls to Sandhills, Mudeford. DoE Ref 3/231 Grid Reference: SZ1848392090.
- Mude Cottage, Mudeford. DoE Ref 2/210 Grid Reference: SZ1799692123.
- Mudeford House, Mudeford. DoE Ref 2/209 Grid Reference: SZ1796892114.
- Nelson's Cottage, Mudeford. DoE Ref 3/230 Grid Reference: SZ1846692074.
- The Staithe, Nos 117 to 119 Mudeford. DoE Ref 3/228 Grid Reference: SZ1832792059.
- Lawn Cottage, Mudeford. DoE Ref 3/229 Grid Reference: SZ1840392072.
- The Anchorage, No 157 Mudeford. Grid Reference: SZ1863592089 DoE Ref 3/234
- Cyprus Cottage, No 51 Mudeford. DoE Ref 2/206 Grid Reference: SZ1775192030.
- Jasmine Cottage and Lavender Cottage, Nos 53 and 55 Mudeford. DoE Ref 2/207 Grid Reference: SZ1776492035.
- Victoria Cottage, No 57 Mudeford. DoE Ref 2/37 Grid Reference: SZ1777392038.
- No 59 Mudeford. DoE Ref 2/208 Grid Reference: SZ1777392038.
- Pillar Box (Victorian), Mudeford. DoE Ref 3/226 Grid Reference: SZ1830892068.
- Scotts Cottage, Mudeford. DoE Ref 3/235 Grid Reference: SZ1874192091.
- Stratford Lodge, Mudeford. DoE Ref 3/223 Grid Reference: SZ1858092092.
- Street boundary wall at Scotts Cottage, Mudeford. DoE Ref 3/236 Grid Reference: SZ1875792095.
- Street boundary wall at The Anchorage, Mudeford. DoE Ref 3/223 Grid Reference: SZ1860092100.
- Willow Lodge, Mudeford. DoE Ref 2/54 Grid Reference: SZ1791692087.
- K6 telephone kiosk at the junction with Church Terraces, Mudeford Green, Mudeford. DoE Ref 3/242 Grid Reference: SZ1831092067.
- Parley Green Farmhouse, Parley Green Lane, Hurn. DoE Ref 12/403 Grid Reference: SZ0977797115.
- Barn at Parley Court, Parley Green Lane, Hurn. DoE Ref 12/405 Grid Reference: SZ0977297207.
- Thatched cottage and adjoining building, Parley Green Lane, Hurn. DoE Ref 12/406 Grid Reference: SZ0983297228.
- The granary at Hurn Bridge Farm, Parley Green Lane, Hurn. DoE Ref 8/341 Grid Reference: SZ1257097031.
- The chapel gatehouse, Parley Green Lane, Hurn. DoE Ref 8/345 Grid Reference: SZ1033597991.
- The farmhouse at Pithouse Lane, Sopley. DoE Ref 8/337 Grid Reference: SZ1392098243.
- Pithouse Cottage, Pithouse Lane, Sopley. DoE Ref 8/336 Grid Reference: SZ1373398028.
- The bridge Furnishing Factory, No 14 Purewell. DoE Ref 2/183 Grid Reference: SZ1653092924.
- The eastern boundary wall, No 34 Purewell. DoE Ref 2/185 Grid Reference: SZ1663992968.
- No 34 Purewell. DoE Ref 2/33 Grid Reference: SZ1661192962.
- No 8 Purewell. DoE Ref 2/180 Grid Reference: SZ1650792910.
- Purewell Farmhouse, Purewell. DoE Ref 2/36 Grid Reference: SZ1673692947.
- The war memorial at Purewell farm, Purewell. DoE Ref 2/199 Grid Reference: SZ1707292986.
- Rear boundary wall at No 35 Purewell. DoE Ref 2/195 Grid Reference: SZ1667292899.
- Rear boundary of Ashtree House, No 39 Purewell. DoE Ref 2/194 Grid Reference: SZ1666892896.
- The gate and piers at Ashtree House, No 39 Purewell. DoE Ref 2/193 Grid Reference: SZ1663692947.
- No 113 Purewell. DoE Ref 2/189 Grid Reference: SZ1694392934.
- No 35 Purewell. DoE Ref 2/34 Grid Reference: SZ1664092903.
- No 37 Purewell. DoE Ref 2/197 Grid Reference: SZ1666392923.
- Ashtree House, No 39 Purewell. DoE Ref 2/35 Grid Reference: SZ1668192915.
- Ye Olde Starre Inne, No 9 Purewell. DoE Ref 2/32 Grid Reference: SZ1652892890.
- Nos 11 and 13 Purewell. DoE Ref 2/198 Grid Reference: SZ1664792884.
- Street boundary, wall and gate, No 37 Purewell. DoE Ref 2/196 Grid Reference: SZ1666992933.
- The Salisbury Arms, Purewell. DoE Ref 2/192 Grid Reference: SZ1673692936.
- The Priory churchyard wall and gates along Quay Road, Christchurch. DoE Ref 1A/146 Grid Reference: SZ1592092543.
- The Priory churchyard wall between the churchyard and the vicarage. Christchurch. DoE Ref 1A/144 Grid Reference: SZ1593992570.
- Christchurch Vicarage, Quay Road, Christchurch. DoE Ref 1A/440 Grid Reference: SZ1591392563.
- Nos 1 and 2 Quay Road, Christchurch. DoE Ref 1A/143 Grid Reference: SZ1588892591.
- Vicarage garden wall along Church Street, Quay Road, Christchurch. DoE Ref 1A/126 Grid Reference: SZ1596492599.
- The art gallery and picture store (originally the stables) at the Red House Museum, Quay Road, Christchurch. DoE Ref 1A/142 Grid Reference: SZ1588292570.
- The bandstand on the Quomps, Quay Road, Christchurch. DoE Ref 1A/148 Grid Reference: SZ1592892385
- The boundary wall to the Red House Museum, Quay Road, Christchurch. DoE Ref 1A/145 Grid Reference: SZ1588292570
- Pillar box (Edward VIII) outside Walkford sub post office, DoE Ref 14/440 Grid Reference: SZ2145894552
- No 144 Ringwood Road, Walkford, Highcliffe. DoE Ref 14/431 Grid Reference: SZ2128494649.
- Ivy Cottage, No 84 Ringwood Road, Walkford, Highcliffe. DoE Ref 14/429 Grid Reference: SZ2158694461.
- Cranemoor URC, No 142 Ringwood Road, Walkford, Highcliffe. DoE Ref 14/430 Grid Reference: SZ2128194634.
- The former Bosley farmhouse, 168 River Way, Christchurch. DoE Ref 8/334 Grid Reference: SZ1380095163.
- The Thatch, Roeshot Hill, Christchurch. DoE Ref 6/273 Grid Reference: SZ1921294486.
- The milestone outside the Roeshot public house, Roeshot Hill, Christchurch. DoE Ref 6/274 Grid Reference: SZ1875194122.
- No 61 Salisbury Road, Burton. DoE Ref 6/287 Grid Reference: SZ1679394398.
- Nos 110 to 114 Salisbury Road, Burton. DoE Ref 6/296 Grid Reference: SZ1672394784.
- Bumble Bee Cottage, Salisbury Road, Burton. DoE Ref 9/377 Grid Reference: SZ1619696013.
- Greenhayes, Salisbury Road, Burton. DoE Ref 9/376 Grid Reference: SZ1619996000.
- No 120 Salisbury Road, Burton. DoE Ref 6/300 Grid Reference: SZ1668794829.
- Nos 64 and 66 Salisbury Road, Burton. DoE Ref 6/295 Grid Reference: SZ1681694410.
- The Parish Church of St. Luke, Salisbury Road, Burton. DoE Ref 6/301 Grid Reference: SZ1667494871.
- The Sycamores, Salisbury Road, Burton. DoE Ref 6/302 Grid Reference: SZ1670094777.
- Clifton Cottage, Salisbury Road, Winkton. DoE Ref 9/375 Grid Reference: SZ1620095983.
- St. Annes Cottage and Kimbolton Cottage, Salisbury Road, Winkton. DoE Ref 9/374 Grid Reference: SZ1619995993.
- The barn at Waters farm, No 45 Salisbury Road, Burton. DoE Ref 6/286 Grid Reference: SZ1677694259.
- Burton Green URC, No 119 Salisbury Road, Burton. DoE Ref 6/291 Grid Reference: SZ1662594794.
- The farmhouse at Staplecross Farm. Salisbury Road, Burton. DoE Ref 6/279 Grid Reference: SZ1712593855.
- Gate piers and street boundary wall, Burton Hall, Salisbury Road, Burton. DoE Ref 9/365A Grid Reference: SZ1657295199.
- The granary at Burton Farm, Salisbury Road, Burton. DoE Ref 6/285 Grid Reference: SZ1693194096.
- The Manor Arms, Salisbury Road, Burton. DoE Ref 6/281 Grid Reference: SZ1702893971.
- The milestone on the west side of Salisbury Road, Burton. DoE Ref 9/371 Grid Reference: SZ1656595252.
- The milestone at Staplecross Farm, Salisbury Road, Burton. DoE Ref 6/278 Grid Reference: SZ1716093832.
- No 1 Salisbury Road, Burton. DoE Ref 6/277 Grid Reference: SZ1714793804.
- The Coach House, No 11 Salisbury Road, Burton. DoE Ref 6/280 Grid Reference: SZ1705693944.
- Brinsons Farm Farmhouse, No 125 Salisbury Road, Burton. DoE Ref 6/29 Grid Reference: SZ1660894852.
- No 143 Salisbury Road, Burton. DoE Ref 6/294 Grid Reference: SZ1662194950
- Martins Hill Farmhouse, No 85 Salisbury Road, Burton. DoE Ref 6/288 Grid Reference: SZ1676894550.
- Ochiltree, Salisbury Road, Burton. DoE Ref 9/368 Grid Reference: SZ1603896288.
- Gosfield Cottage, Salisbury Road, Winkton. DoE Ref 9/366 Grid Reference: SZ1616496044.
- Monks Revel, Salisbury Road, Winkton. DoE Ref 9/365 Salisbury Road, Winkton. Grid Reference: SZ1617695992.
- No 105 (Whitehayes) and No 107 (Sunnyhayes) Salisbury Road, Burton. DoE Ref 6/290 Grid Reference: SZ1670594700.
- The Cedars, No 29 Salisbury Road, Burton. DoE Ref 6/283 Grid Reference: SZ1696094094.
- Nos 6 and 8 Scotts Hill Lane, Purewell. DoE Ref 6/275 Grid Reference: SZ1664193016.
- Nos 9 to 11 (consecutively) Silver Street, Christchurch. DoE Ref 1A/137 Grid Reference: SZ1581092606.
- No 56 Sopers Lane, Christchurch. DoE Reference: 1/45 Grid Reference: SZ1546892594.
- Nos 58 and 60 Sopers Lane, Christchurch. DoE Reference: 1/170 Grid Reference: SZ1546592582.
- No 69 Stanpit, Mudeford. DoE Reference: 2/214 Grid Reference: SZ1720692536.
- The boundary wall at No 69 Stanpit, Mudeford. 2/213 Grid Reference: SZ1721392514.
- Meath Cottage, No 168 Stony Lane, Burton. DoE Reference: 6/323 Grid Reference: SZ1603094948.
- No 70 (Hill View ) No 172 (Lilac Cottage) Stony Lane, Burton. DoE Reference: 6/324 Grid Reference: SZ1602694964.
- Yew Tree Cottage, No 163 Stony Lane, Burton. DoE Reference: 6/317 Grid Reference: SZ1601394864.
- Roselea Cottage, No 165 Stony Lane, Burton. DoE Reference: 6/318 Grid Reference: SZ1600194884.
- Cherry Tree Cottage, No 167 Stony Lane, Burton. DoE Reference: 6/319 Grid Reference: SZ1600494896.
- Rose Cottage, No 169 Stony Lane, Burton. DoE Reference: 6/320 Grid Reference: SZ1599994913.
- Avon Beck Cottage, No 173 Stony Lane, Burton. DoE Reference: 6/321 Grid Reference: SZ1598194942.
- Abbotswood, No 32 Stour Way, Christchurch. DoE Reference: 5/262 Grid Reference: SZ1374594454.
- The lodge to Greystones house, Waterford Road, Highcliffe. DoE Reference: 13/434 Grid Reference: SZ2161393417.
- No 3 Whitehall, Christchurch. DoE Reference: 1A/135 Grid Reference: SZ1573392493.
- Nos 2 and 4 Whitehall, Christchurch. DoE Reference: 1A/141 Grid Reference: SZ1589192654.
