= The Town Hall, Christchurch =

Municipal building in Christchurch, Dorset, England

Christchurch Town Hall
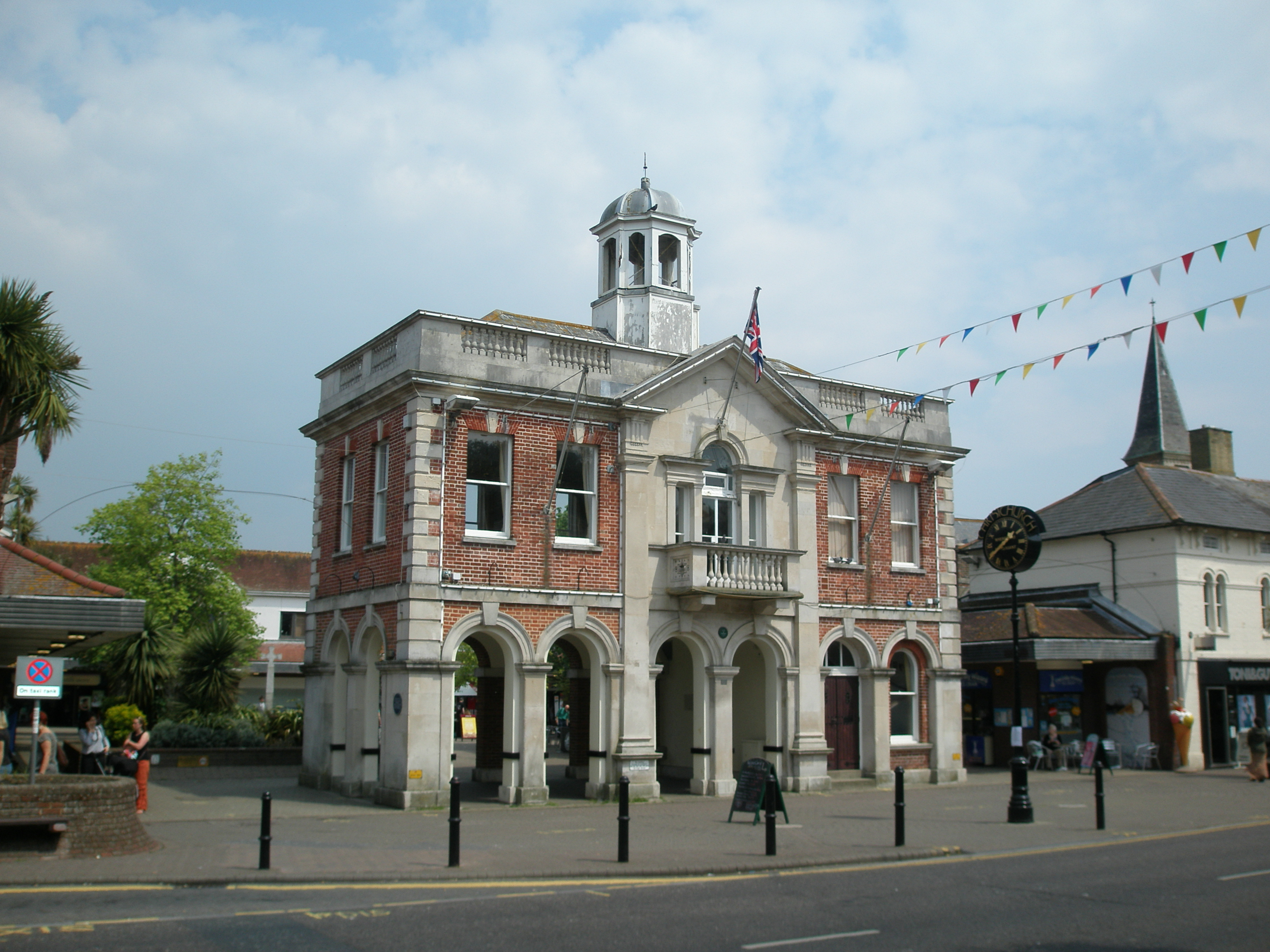
- Christchurch Town Hall

- Shown in Dorset
- 50.7349°N 1.7776°W
- Location: Christchurch

History
- Built: 1746 (moved and rebuilt 1859)

Site notes
- Architectural style: Classical style

Listed Building – Grade II
- Official name: Town Hall
- Designated: 12 February 1976
- Reference no.: 1324677

The Town Hall, Christchurch is a municipal building in Christchurch, Dorset, England. The building, which incorporates a room known as the mayor's parlour on the first floor, and is a Grade II listed building. It is currently the base of Christchurch Town Council.

== History ==
The first town hall was a medieval timber structure built in Millhams Street. The current town hall, which was designed in the neoclassical style, was originally built in the Market Square in 1746 but, in order to improve traffic flow, it was dismantled and rebuilt in its current position in the former Blanchard's Yard in the High Street in 1859. The move to Blanchard's Yard was funded by public subscription and financially supported by the local member of parliament, Admiral John Edward Walcott.

The design involved a symmetrical main frontage with six bays facing onto the High Street; the central section of two bays, which slightly projected forward, featured arcading on the ground floor to allow markets to be held, and a stone balcony and Venetian window on the first floor flanked by full-height Doric order pilasters supporting an open pediment. There was a cupola with a weather vane at roof level. Internally, the principal room was the mayor's parlour on the first floor. There was a lock-up under the stairs to accommodate criminals.

The borough council, which met in the town hall, was reformed under the Municipal Corporations Act 1883. A technical school, which had been built to the north of the town hall in 1902, was later acquired by Christchurch Borough Council and converted for municipal use to accommodate a new council chamber. The town hall continued to serve as the headquarters of Christchurch Borough Council and became the local seat of government of the enlarged local government district of Christchurch, which was formed by the merger of the Municipal Borough of Christchurch with part of Ringwood and Fordingbridge Rural District, in 1974. However, in the light of the new district council's increased responsibilities, civic leaders decided to move to new civic offices in Bridge Street in 1978. Some restoration work including replacement of the cupola was carried out in autumn 1988.

The old technical school, which had become surplus to requirements, was demolished to make way for Saxon Square in 1992. Proposals to glaze the ground floor of the town hall were recommended to the local council in August 2015.

After Bournemouth, Christchurch and Poole (BCP), was created as the unitary authority for the area in April 2019, Christchurch Town Council, the first tier of local government, was created at the same time as the unitary authority, with its offices in the town hall. An extensive programme of restoration works, including replacement of the lead pipework and further work on the cupola, began in January 2020.

== See also ==
- Listed buildings in Christchurch, Dorset
