= Twynham School =

Location
- Sopers Lane; Christchurch, Dorset, BH23 1JF; England; 50°44′00″N 1°46′58″W

Information
- Type: Academy
- Motto: "Ut Prosim" - "That I may serve"
- Local authority: Bournemouth, Christchurch and Poole
- Department for Education URN: 136649 Tables
- Ofsted: Reports
- Executive Head Teacher: Matthew Woodville
- Head of School: Kate Ball
- Gender: Coeducational
- Age: 11 to 18
- Enrolment: 1,729
- Website: http://www.twynhamschool.com

Twynham School (formerly Twynham Comprehensive School) is a coeducational secondary school and sixth form located in Christchurch, Dorset, England, and has a school roll of approximately 1,700 students in years 7 to 13 (ages 11 to 18). It has Leading Edge, Training School and Academy Statuses. Twynham is part of the Twynham Learning Multi-Academy Trust, comprising six primary and secondary schools local to Christchurch.

== School history ==
The school opened in 1930 as a senior school, later becoming a secondary modern school and finally a comprehensive in 1969. The school doubled in size during the 1990s and is one of the largest schools in Dorset. In May 2011 Twynham converted into an academy. It has previously held the Technology College and Music College Statuses.

== Facilities ==
Twynham School has 11 science labs. The technology block has two cookery rooms, one textiles room, three resistant material rooms and one graphics room, in addition to an IT room.

In addition, there is an English Block, Maths Block, Drama Block, Music & Arts Block and the main hall, sports hall, changing facilities and the main block with more classrooms, and a sixth form building.

=== ICT at Twynham ===
Twynham has nine computer rooms and offers two courses at GCSE level:

- Computing (Software Development (mainly in Visual Basic))
- European Computer Driving Licence from 2014–present

Twynham also offers a BTEC in Creative Digital Media.

== Extra curricular activities ==
Extra curricular activities include sports, music and drama.

== Notable former pupils ==
- Leo Harrison (1922–2016), first-class cricketer
- Jamie Redknapp, pundit and retired footballer
- Neil Moss, coach and retired footballer
