= Frederick Twynham =

English cricketer

Personal information
- Full name: Frederick Twynam

Domestic team information
- Years: Team
- 1848–1850: Hampshire

Career statistics
Competition	FC
Matches	3
Runs scored	29
Batting average	7.25
100s/50s	–/–
Top score	12
Balls bowled	–
Wickets	–
Bowling average	–
5 wickets in innings	–
10 wickets in match	–
Best bowling	–
Catches/stumpings	–/–
- Source: Cricinfo, 27 April 2010

Frederick Twynam (c. 1806 in England – 6 January 1868 at Portswood, Hampshire) was an English first-class cricketer.

Twynam represented Hampshire in three first-class matches, making his debut in 1848 against an All England Eleven. Twynam played two further first-class matches in 1849 and 1850, both of which were against the All England Eleven.

Twynam died on 6 January 1868 at Portswood, Hampshire.
