= Christchurch Castle =

Castle in Dorset, England

Coordinates: 50.733369°N 1.775010°W

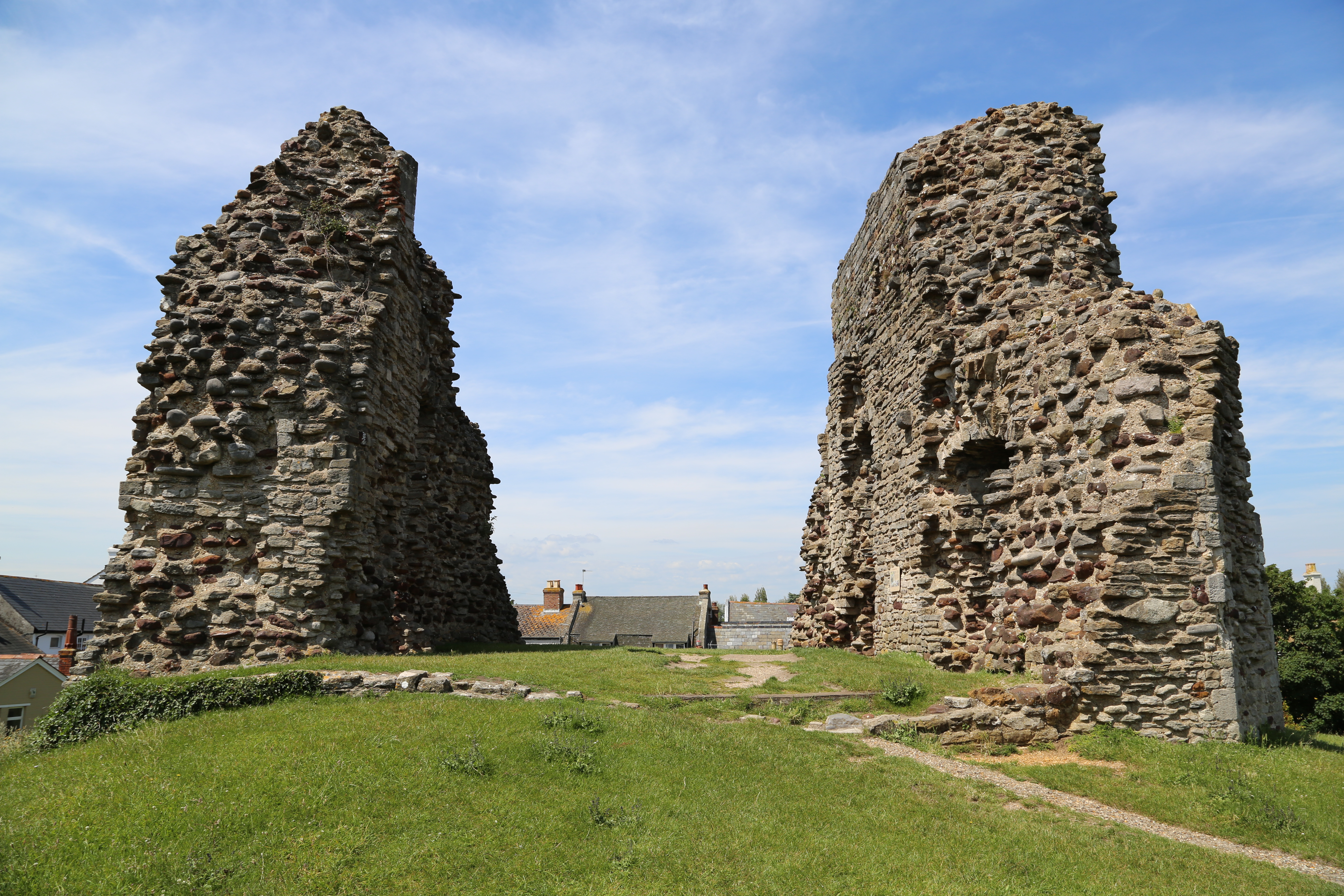
The two remaining walls of the castle's keep

Christchurch Castle is a Norman motte and bailey castle in Christchurch, Dorset, England (grid reference SZ160927). The earliest stonework has been dated to 1160 (866 years ago). The castle's site is inside the old Saxon burh dominating the River Avon's lowest crossing.

The Constable's House standing adjacent to the castle was added at around 1160, and is a rare and notable example of a Norman domestic dwelling. Today the bailey is home to a bowling green and gardens, and the ditch has been filled in, but parts of the keep and much of the Constable's House still stand. The site is managed by English Heritage.

== Castle ==
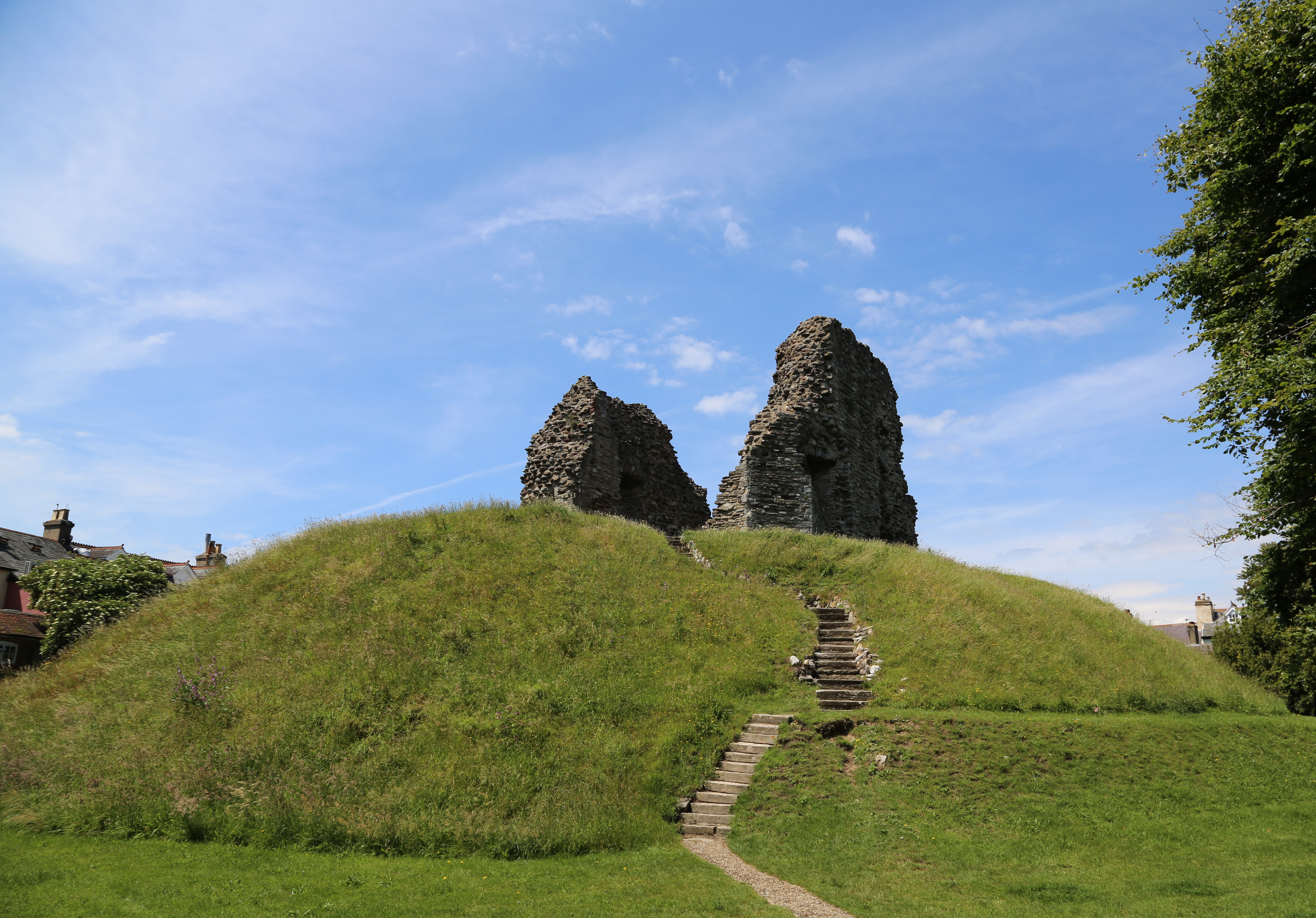
The keep and the motte or mound on which it sits

The castle is believed to stand on the site of an earlier wooden fort built in 924 following the capture of the town ramparts in 901 by King Æthelwold of Wessex, and subsequently fortified with a motte by King Edward the Elder. After the Norman Conquest of 1066 the castle's defences were strengthened by the addition of a ditch and bailey surrounded by a wooden palisade. The wooden fort was eventually replaced with a stone keep. The Norman castle was a strategic defensive structure controlled by the King's constable until King Henry I (r. 1100–1135) granted it as the caput of a feudal barony to his cousin Richard de Redvers (died 1107), feudal baron of Plympton, Devon. While the Saxon defences had been against outside threats such as Viking raiders, the Norman fortress was more concerned with subduing the local populace. It was also a useful base for enforcing the New Forest Laws. The castle controlled the harbour and inland access via the Rivers Avon and Stour. The earliest masonry has been dated to c. 1160, and there is documentary evidence of the castle existing in c. 1130. Richard de Redvers is often named as the castle's first builder, although there is little documentary evidence of this, and this castle may well have been on the site of the earlier Saxon castle. The castle was rebuilt by Baldwin de Redvers to resist King Stephen during the civil war with the Empress Matilda in 1147. A great tower was built probably around 1300. The castle again saw action during the Civil War of 1642–1651. The Parliamentarians were allowed to take control of the castle in 1644. The Royalists laid siege to it for 3 days, demolishing houses on the corner of Church Street and Castle Street in order to site their cannons. The Royalists were unable to take the castle and Oliver Cromwell, fearing such a powerful stronghold, ordered it to be slighted in 1652. The castle is now in ruins; a couple of the keep walls remain and the remains of a rectangular moat.

== Constable's House ==
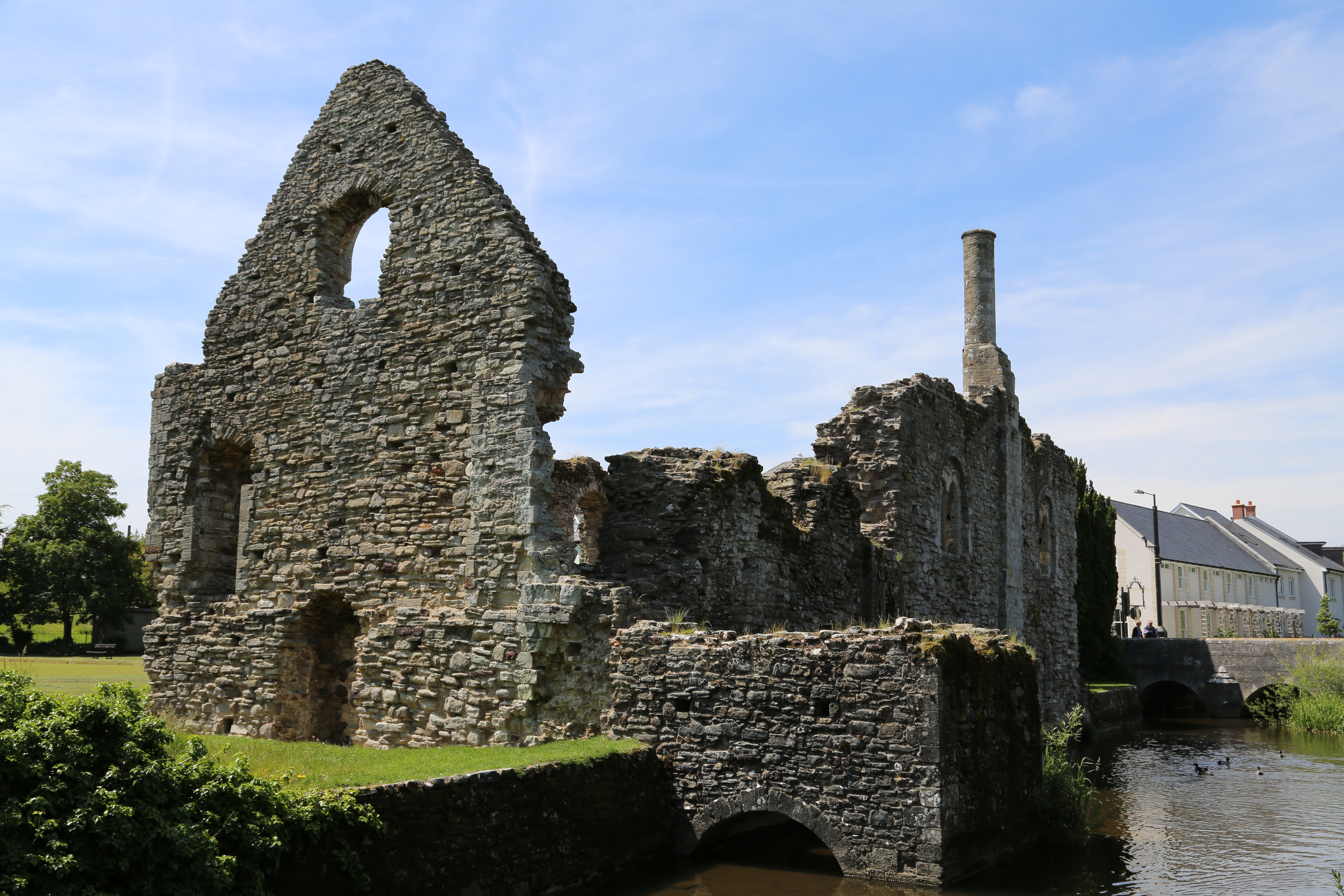
The Constable's House

Nearby is a domestic Norman dwelling, known as the Constable's House, which was built within the original castle bailey in 1160. Much of the stonework survives, including a rare example of a Norman chimney (one of only five in the country). The stone used for construction was Purbeck marble. The ground floor which has four slit windows was used as a storeroom. The upper floor, accessed by steps outside and an internal staircase, contained the main hall. It is 67 by 23 feet (20 by 7 m) in size. As well as the chimney, another notable feature is the garderobe tower, which extends over the mill stream added in the early 13th century to provide sanitary arrangements.

== Heritage status ==
Both the Castle and Constable's House are Grade I listed buildings. The area containing the adjacent priory, the castle and Constable's House is separately designated as a Scheduled Monument.

== See also ==
- Castles in Great Britain and Ireland
- List of castles in England
