= Celtic currency of Britain =

Ancient British currency

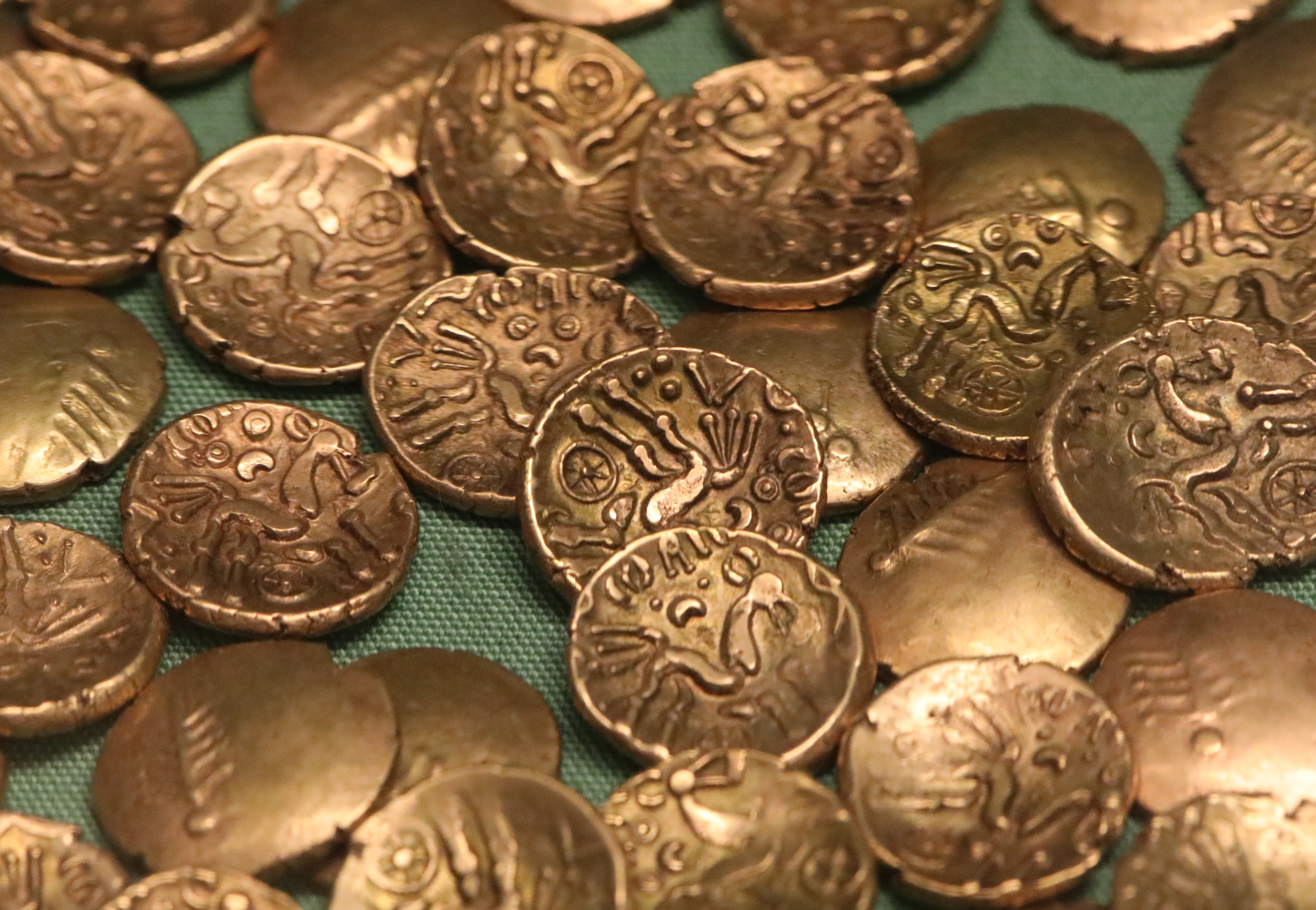
Part of the Farmborough Hoard consisting of staters inscribed "CORIO"

The Celtic currency of Britain were the various items and coins used as currency between approximately 200 BC and AD 60. The earliest currency consisted of various forms of iron bars. Coins were first imported in large numbers in around 150 BC and domestic minting began around 100BC. Coin production was largely ended by the Roman conquest of Britain, first by the Claudian invasion of AD 43 and later by the Defeat of Boudica in AD 60 or 61. Cast coins may have been produced for a few more years around Hengistbury Head. Exact dating of coins often changes in the light of new research.

Coin use is usually divided into a core area which covers the home counties as well as parts of Oxfordshire, Northamptonshire and Cambridgeshire. This was surrounded by a periphery of coin using groups some of which, the Corieltauvi, Durotriges, Dobunni and Iceni, appear to have minted their own coinage. The coins in the core area are generally attributed to the Atrebates and Cantii in the areas south of the Thames and the Trinovantes and Catuvellauni to the north.

The archaeological record may be distorted by cases of the deliberate falsification of find spots. Historically this falsification may have been driven by farm-workers wanting to hide that they had taken the coins from their employer's land. More recently, false provenances have been produced to hide the source of coins looted by metal detectorists such as the mass looting of the Wanborough Temple site.

== Iron bar and other non-coinage currency ==
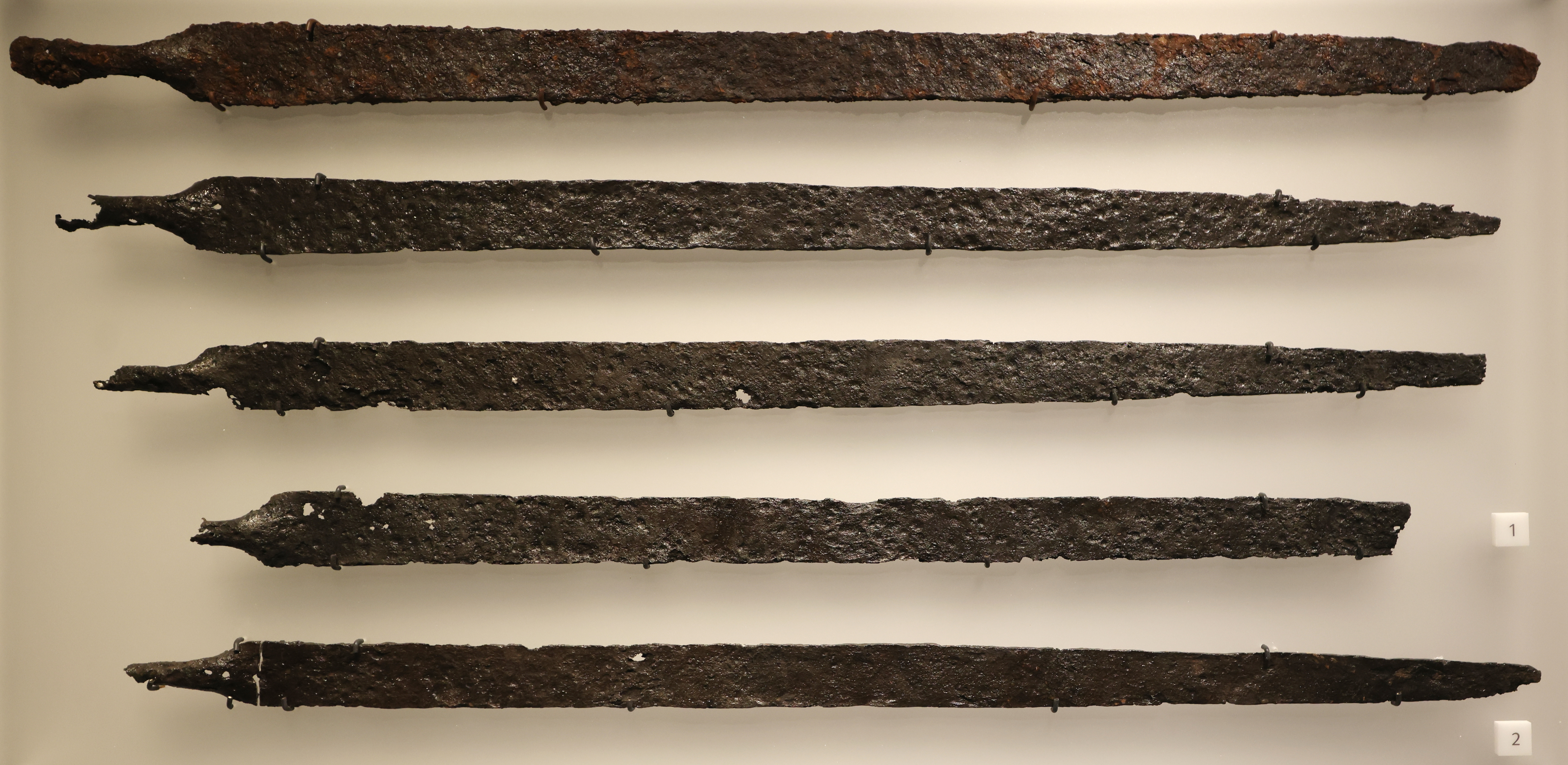
Sword type iron bar currency

The first currency in Britain appears to have been iron currency bars first appearing around 200BC. Currency bars have been found in four forms known as sword-shaped, spit-shaped, plough-shaped, and bay-leaf-shaped. It has been suggested that these shapes were used to show the origin of the bars. The bars generally weigh between 0.3–0.5 kg (0.66–1.10 lb). Spit-shaped bars are the most commonly found, representing half of all finds. Sword-shaped bars make up another 40 percent.

What appears to be iron bar currency was mentioned in Julius Caesar's Commentarii de Bello Gallico. There are variances in the surviving texts, meaning that it is possible the original text was referring to iron ring money. However, iron bar currency is considered more likely in the light of archaeological discoveries.

Historically it has been claimed that gold rings were used as currency, but improved dating has rendered this claim unlikely. John Lesley, writing in the 16th century, claimed that leather money had been issued in Scotland in the second century BC. No evidence for this claim has been found.

== Coins ==
=== Names ===
The original names of British Celtic coins are unknown.

Modern researchers have given coins whether inscribed or uninscribed various names. Gold coins are described as staters or quarter staters, with the name deriving from Greek coins. Gold staters generally weighed between 4.5–6.5 g (0.16–0.23 oz). Quarter staters, as their name suggests, had about a quarter of the weight of gold staters. A few gold coins without clear weight relationships to staters are sometimes called gold fractions.

Silver coins are described as staters, units, half units and minims. Units generally weighed between 0.8–1.4 g (0.028–0.049 oz), with half units about half the weight of units. Minims covers the various silver coins weighing less than 0.4 g (0.014 oz).

Copper alloy coins are described as staters, quarter staters, and units with cast staters and potins being considered separately.

More specific names for individual coin types generally consist of catalog numbers, although in some cases simple descriptions are used. Over the decades various catalogs have been compiled, with Van Arsdell's 1989 catalog being the most popular. Overlap between catalogs does, however, mean that a coin can have as many as seven different names.

=== Methods of manufacture ===
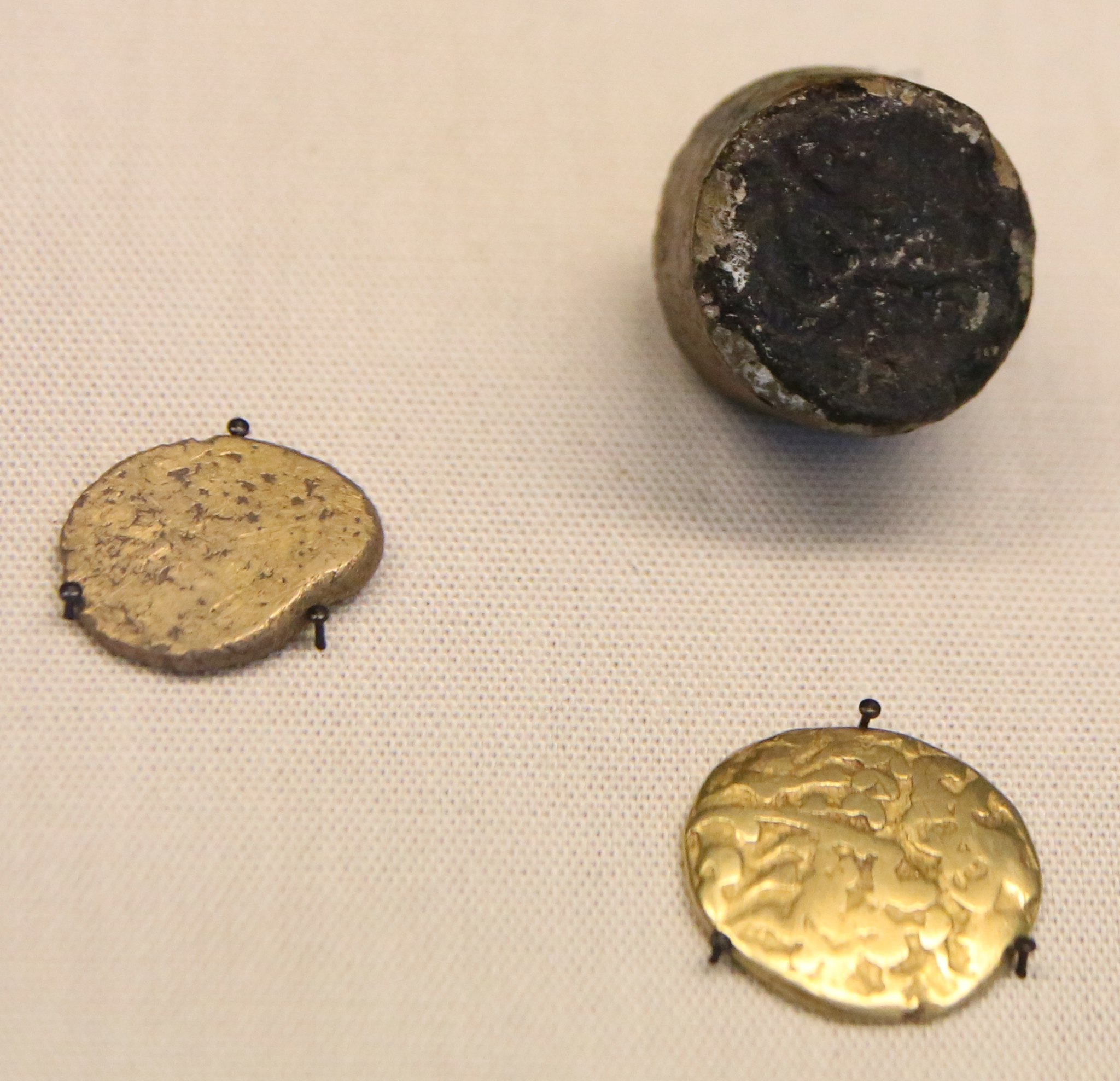
Top to bottom: A die for striking a Gallo-Belgic A stater, a blank of the type that would be struck, a Gallo-Belgic A stater

Most British Celtic coins were struck although a few were cast.

The exact details of the method by which struck coins were struck remains unclear. It is thought most likely that struck coins were made by a four-step process. First, a fairly exact amount (accuracies of a few milligrams or better have been recorded) of metal would be weighed out in the form of powder or nugget. The metal would then be placed in a clay mould and heated to form a blank. Examples of these moulds have been found in archaeological excavations. The blank would then be flattened before finally being placed between two dies and struck. The lower die would be concave in order to hold the blank in place while the upper die would be convex. The dies were frequently larger than the blanks being struck, resulting in only part of the design appearing on the coin. Experimental archaeology suggests that a lower die could be expected to last for up to 10,000 strikes depending on the level of wear deemed acceptable. Upper dies seem to have a far greater range of lives, with usable lives ranging from just over 100 strikes to nearly 8,000 being reported. Combining archaeological evidence with historic records suggests ancient coin producers could get as many as 47,000 strikes out of an individual die.

It is possible that in some cases, instead of moulds being used, the metal would be melted and poured onto a flat surface.

A number of coins from the period consisting of a base metal core and a precious metal coating have been found. These would have been made by coating the base metal with a thin layer of precious metal, then striking the blank. While these coins for the most part appear to have been straightforward forgeries, some appear to have been struck using the same dies as non forgeries, making their status less clear.

In the case of cast coins, a series of clay moulds joined by runners were used. The patterns on the coins were produced by pressing a pattern into the clay or, in simpler cases, scratching lines in it. Molten metal would then be poured into the moulds. Once the metal had cooled, the moulds would be broken to access the coins.

=== Imported coins ===
The earliest coins to appear in the British archaeological record are third or fourth century BC Carthaginian bronzes, although it seems unlikely that they were used as currency. It is possible that these coins entered Celtic society as payment to mercenaries by Carthage and Syracuse. Other coins from the end of the third century and start of the second century BC have been found but there is no evidence for their use as currency and the situation is complicated by contamination by modern losses. Post antiquity a direct trade route for Greek coins into Britain has existed since the creation of the Levant Company in the late 16th century.

Around 150BC Gallo-Belgic staters started being imported into Britain. These coins followed designs ultimately derived from the staters issued by Philip II of Macedon and were made from gold. Philip's staters featured on the obverse the head of Apollo wearing a wreath. On the reverse they carried an image of a Biga chariot being pulled by two horses and carrying a figure wielding a whip. Six series of Gallo-Belgic staters issues are known as A through to F with subtypes such as AA and AB (in this case defined by the direction in which the bust faces). Of these it is C through to F that would have the most impact on later British coin designs. The minting of these coins came to an end with the Roman conquest of Gaul. It is possible that at least some of these coins were produced in Britain instead of being imported. A die for striking Gallo Belgic A coins has been found in Bredgar, Kent but it isn't clear if it was used for official strikes or forgeries.

Along with the Gallo-Belgic stater series other coins from the continent have been found in Britain. Ambiani coins have been found along the south coast of the West Country, possibly arriving there as the result of trade across the English Channel.

=== Potins ===
Kentish cast bronzes (historically referred to as Thurrock potins) appear to have been the first coins made in Britain dating from the end of the second century BC. They appear to have circulated mainly in Kent and were based on coins issued by Massalia (now Marseille in modern France). Various other potins were issued with production ending around 50BC. These coins were cast rather than struck. Although potins were around at the same time as the first British gold coins they are not found together which suggests they served a different role in society. Potins continued to circulate for some time after the Roman conquest of Britain and they have been found in burials dating to the late Roman period.

=== Uninscribed staters ===
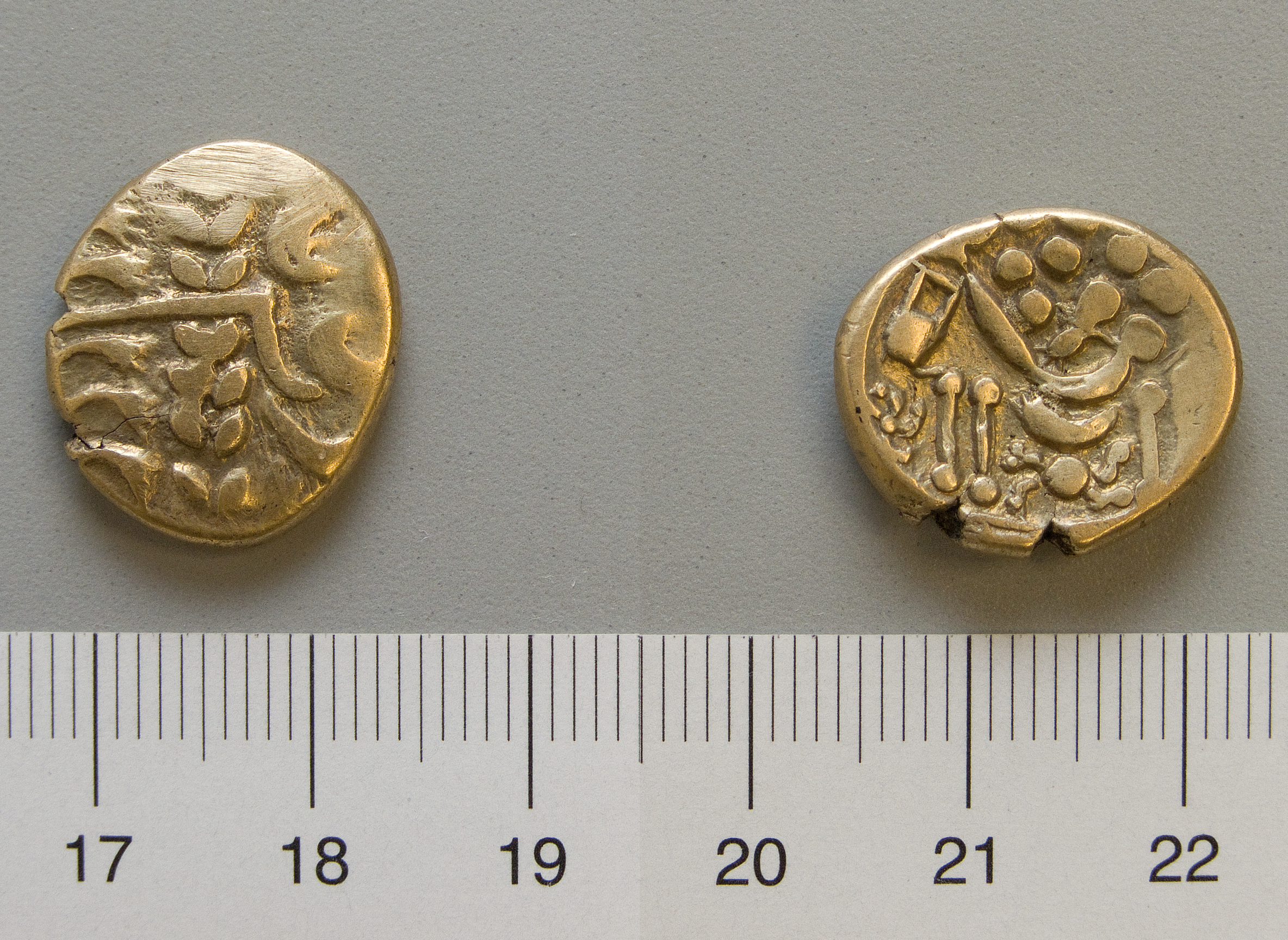
British A stater scale in cm

The first known British stater was based on the Gallo-Belgic C stater and appears to have been made by melting down said staters and re-striking them. It is referred to as the British A stater or the Westerham and Ingoldisthorpe stater, and was probably made shortly after 100BC. The coin is often credited to the Atrebates kingdom but this is uncertain.

At much the same time or shortly afterwards, a range of uninscribed British staters was produced by various groups, with inscribed coins not appearing until after 50BC. As with the Gallo-Belgic staters, these coins have been divided into a number of series which have in turn been divided into various subtypes.

Series	Alternative names	First minted	Minted by	Mainly found	Based on	Image
A	Westerham and Ingoldisthorpe, Westerham	100BC or shortly after	Atrebates?		Gallo-Belgic C	
B	Chute	60-50BC	Durotriges?	Dorset, Wiltshire and Somerset	Gallo-Belgic C	
C	Yarmouth			Hampshire, Isle of Wight	British A	
D	Cheriton	50BC-30BC		Hampshire, Isle of Wight	British B	
F	Clacton	100BC or shortly after				
G	Clacton cross	100BC or shortly after				
H	North-east coast	70BC	Corieltauvi		Gallo-Belgic C	
I		70BC	Corieltauvi		Gallo-Belgic C	
J	Norfolk wolf	50BC	Iceni		Gallo-Belgic E	
K	South Ferriby	40BC	Corieltauvi			
L	Whaddon Chase	50BC	Cassivellaunus?	Hertfordshire, Buckinghamshire, Bedfordshire and Essex		
N	Freckenham	40BC	Iceni			
Q		50BC			Gallo-Belgic F	
R			Dobunni		British Q?	

During the Gallic Wars the weight of gold staters being issued fell slightly. At the same time silver coinage started to be issued in some areas.

=== Inscribed coins ===
==== Core area north of the Thames ====
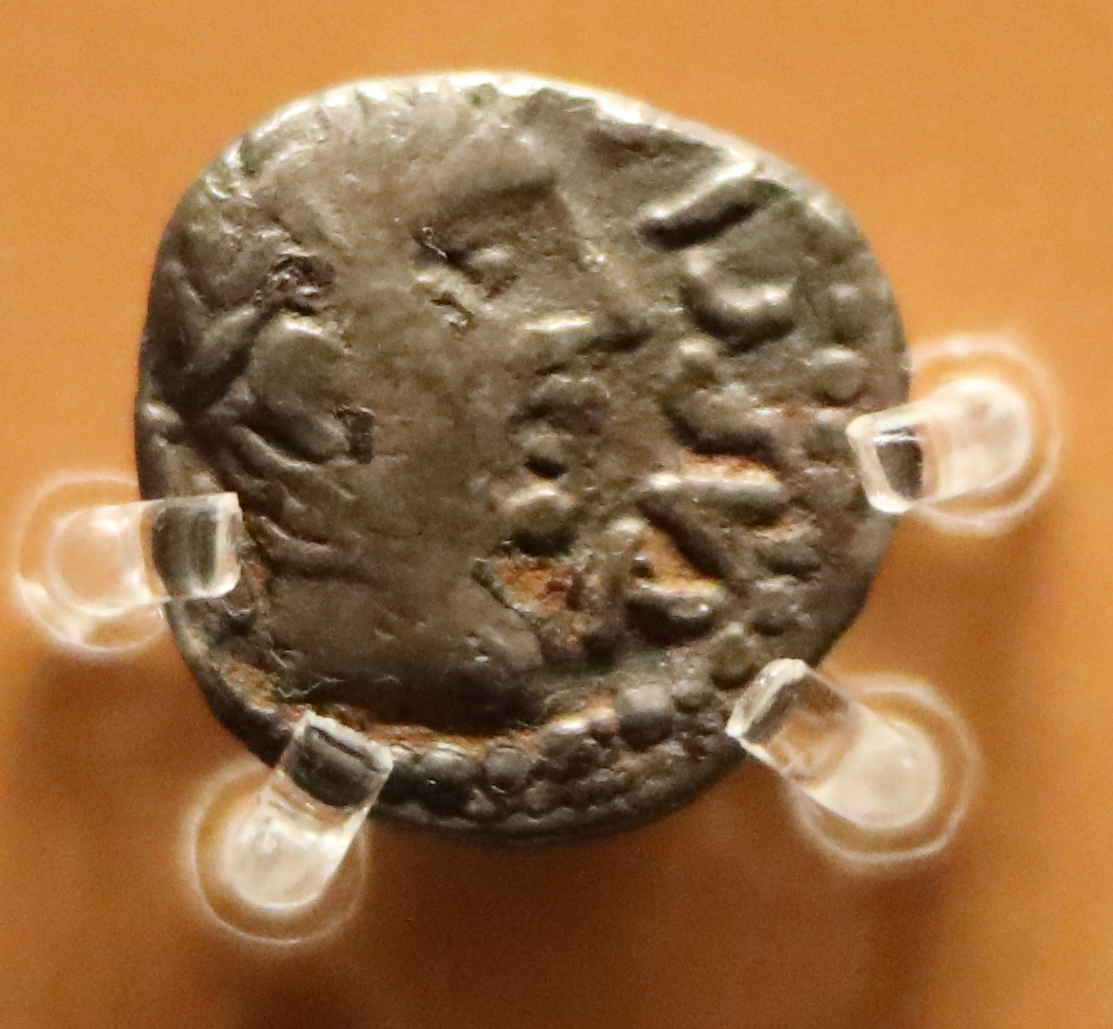
Silver unit of Tasciovanus showing Roman influence

The first inscribed coins in this area date from approximately 35BC and are credited to Addedomarus. The coins consisted of gold staters based on the British L stater, gold quarter staters, and silver and bronze coins of lower value. Addedomarus's coins overlap with those of Tasciovanus, who also initially issued inscribed staters based on the British L stater. Tasciovanus's later coins appear more Romanised, most noticeably in the case of those struck in silver and bronze. Another feature in the later part of Tasciovanus's rule are coins in the names of Andoco, Sego, Dias, and Rues. Issued in the decade either side of AD 1, they most likely belonged to sub-rulers who answered to Tasciovanus.

A number of Addedomarus's coins featured a palm branch, which also appeared on the stater of his apparent successor Dubnovellaunus. Like his predecessor Dubnovellaunus, he produced silver and bronze coins although in fairly small amounts.

Tasciovanus's apparent son Cunobelin managed to gain control of the entire region. His staters again featured the palm branch among other images. His bronze and silver coins developed over time from Celtic-influenced designs to those influenced by a very wide range of Mediterranean coinage. Cunobelin's coins may have been the last issued in the area prior to the Roman invasion in AD 43. A few coins have been attributed with little certainty to his sons.

==== Core area south of the Thames ====
The first inscribed coinage in this area was struck around 30BC and was based on the British Q stater. These coins were inscribed COMMIOS and appear to have been issued by the son of the Commius mentioned by Julius Caesar in his writings, although it is possible that the first of these coins was issued by the original Commius. The only coins with the COMMIOS inscription are gold staters, but quarter starters and silver coins have been linked to the series. The COMMIOS Gold staters contained about 47% gold and weighed between 5.3g and 5.5g. After Commius two series of coins appear to have been issued by Tincommius and another by Eppillus.

Tincommius initially issued coins that followed much the same pattern as Commius but at the end of the first century BC switched to heavily Roman-inspired designs with what has been called the proto-classical series. In all Tincommius's coins have been divided into 4 series; first the Celtic then the Proto-classical, followed by the Crude and Classical which appear to have been struck around the same time. Tincommius issued silver coins as well as gold and his Roman-derived silver coins have a metal content that suggests they were made from melted down Denarii. Stylistic considerations and a lack of Mules for certain designs suggest Tincommius may have operated two mints. However find-spot data suggests that they may both (if there were indeed two mints) have operated in the vicinity of modern Chichester or alternatively it possible that one of the mints was located at Calleva Atrebatum. Tincommius's gold staters weighed around 5.3g while his gold quarter staters weighed around 1.03g. The various silver units assigned to Tincommius weighed between 1.14 and 1.32g while the silver minims were around 0.3g.

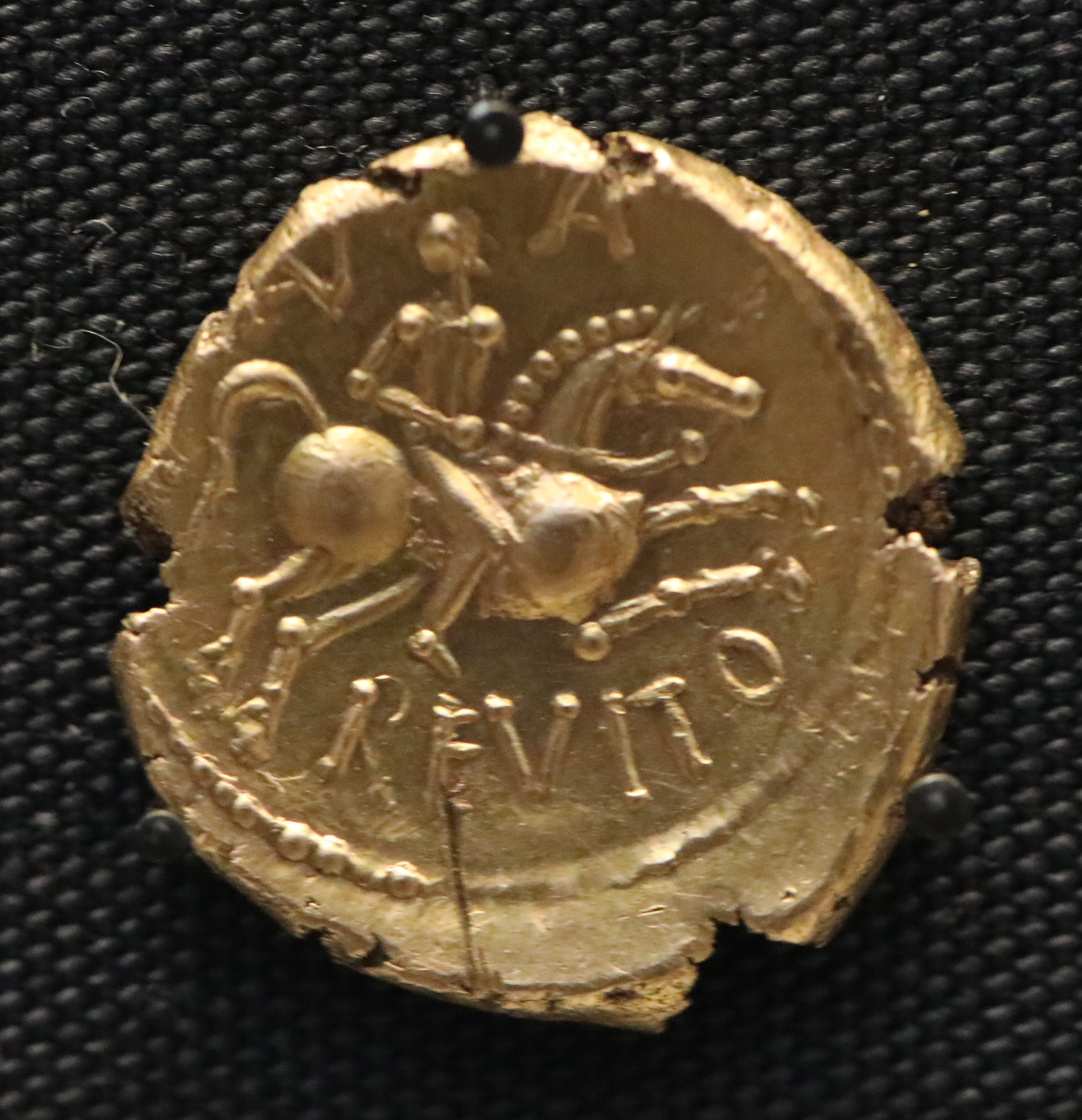
Stater of Anarevito

Eppillus appears to have held land in two areas and issued a different series of coins in each of them. In particular the gold coins Eppillus had circulated in the area around Calleva Atrebatum were thicker than those circulated in Eppillus's holdings in northern Kent and the silver coins heavier. The style of the coins suggests a different die cutter in each region with a few cases of each cutter producing a die for the other region. The coins issued around Calleva Atrebatum represent something of a break from previous styles although some of them appear to have derived design elements from the coins of Tincommius as well as various Roman denari. A single stater has been found in Dover baring the name of Eppillus and an otherwise unknown Anarevito. A small number of coins have been found in kent that appear to have been jointly minted by Eppillus, Tincommius and a third leader named Verica. The style of these coins is similar to those circulated in Eppillus's holdings in northern Kent with elements similar enough to suggest a common die cutter.

Eppillus and Tincommius appear to have had their holdings taken over by Verica who from around AD 10 issued gold staters and quarter staters based on those of Tincommius and Eppillus. Differences in style between coins suggests that Verica was operating two mints one using an engraver formerly employed by Eppillus and the other derived from Tincommius. Verica's stater series weighed between 5.27g and 5.29g while the gold content varied between 42% and 44.5% The gold content appears to have remained stable over time with no sign of debasement. Verica also issued silver coins striking both units and minims. As with his staters these made heavy use of Roman motifs. In the AD 30s Epaticcus issued staters along with silver units and minims in an area around Silchester. British coin striking in the area came to an end with the Roman conquest of Britain in AD 43.

==== Periphery to the north of the core area ====
The first inscribed coinage in this area appear to have been struck by the Corieltauvi around AD 1 and were closely based on the proceeding British K stater. The coins were inscribed with the letters VEP and it has been suggested that this and other inscriptions refer to the names of leaders. These were followed by coins inscribed either AVN AST or AVN COST. After these issues the chronology becomes unclear and it is possible that at times there were multiple coin issuing authorities. The standard denominations appear to have been staters, silver units and silver half units although some of the rarer inscriptions haven't been found in all denominations.

The other main tribal group in this region was the Iceni who started producing inscribed coins around AD 20. Their coins were fairly creative while sticking to firmly Celtic themes up until their final issues. Its not clear who or what most of the inscriptions on the coins refer to although it has been suggested that ECEN is a version of Iceni. This would though run against general Celtic coin inscription practices. The last coins struck by the Iceni appear to have been those of Prasutagus. Unlike their predecessors these coins show heavy Roman influence in their design. The defeat of the Iceni and the end of Boudicca's revolt in AD 60 or 61 brought an end to Iceni coin production.

==== Periphery to the west of the core area ====
Two tribes in this area issued coins the Dobunni and Durotriges. Their coin designs tended to be fairly conservative and show little Roman influence.

The first inscribed Dobunni coins were those inscribed (and presumably issued by) BODVOC and CORIO. The exact chronology is unclear but CORIO appears to have started issuing coins around 30BC. It is possible that Bodvoc and Corio were ruling different parts of the Dobunni territory at around the same time. The Dobunni during this period appear to have mostly issued in silver with only irregular minting of gold coinage. Bodvoc and Corio appear to have been followed by Comux and Catti. Again the chronology is unclear and it is possible that they were ruling different parts of the Dobunni territory. Of the four (Bodvoc, Corio, Comux and Catti) only Bodvoc appears to have issued inscribed silver coins with the others possibly being to connected to various uninscribed silver coins that appear to have been issued in the area. Comux and Catti appear to have been followed by Anted and Eisv probably in that order. Unlike their predecessors they did issue inscribed silver units. A branched emblem appears on the obverse of a number of the Dobunni's gold staters. The symbol's significance and origins are unclear although corn, ferns and a derivative of the wreath on the British Q stater have all been suggested.

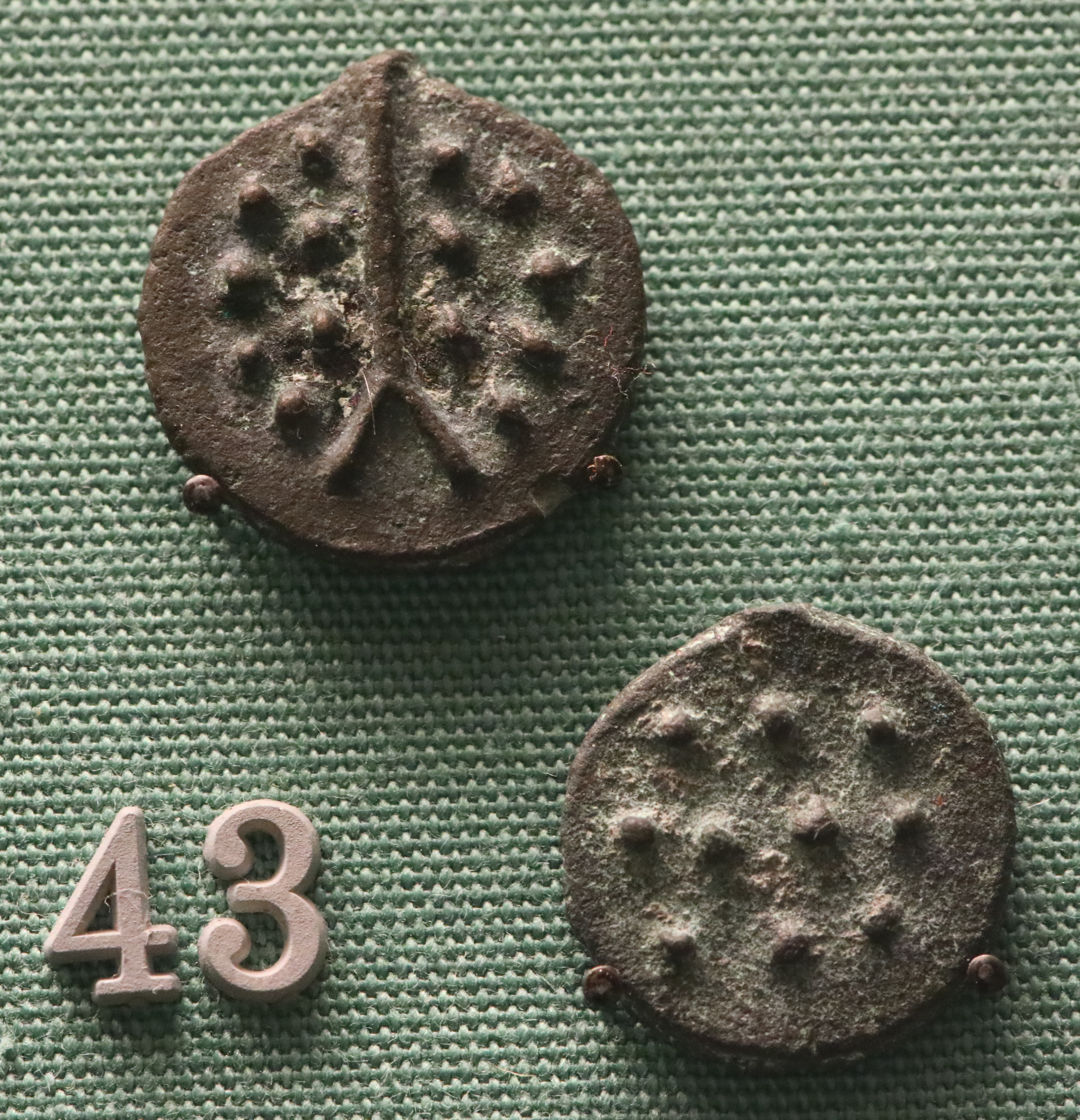
Hengistbury Head cast coins

The Durotriges issued a series of rapidly debased coins through this period probably starting around 50BC with a largely silver (80%) stater (British B) with a fairly small percentage of gold. It has been suggested that the tribe simply lacked access to gold at this point. Due to a lack of coins being found in a secure archaeological context there is some uncertainty over assigning some of the earlier coins to the Durotriges so it is possible true Durotrigian coinage didn't start until a few years later. Regardless of the starting point the level of silver used in Durotrigian coins rapidly declined until by 30BC their coins were being struck in bronze. Somewhere between AD 10 and 40, the Durotriges appear to have issued a silver unit inscribed with CRAB. The final Durotrigian coins were cast bronzes that have largely been found around Hengistbury Head. These have been found alongside Roman coins and it certainly seems possible that they were minted after the Roman conquest although the reason for this minting and why it would be allowed is unclear. Minting came to an end by AD 100.

=== Scotland and Wales ===
No coins were minted in Wales or Scotland during this period. As of 2015 only 35 Celtic coins had been found in Wales with nearly 50% being those produced by the Dobunni. In the early 2020s a hoard of a further 15 coins minted by the Corieltavi were found near Llangoed on Anglesey.

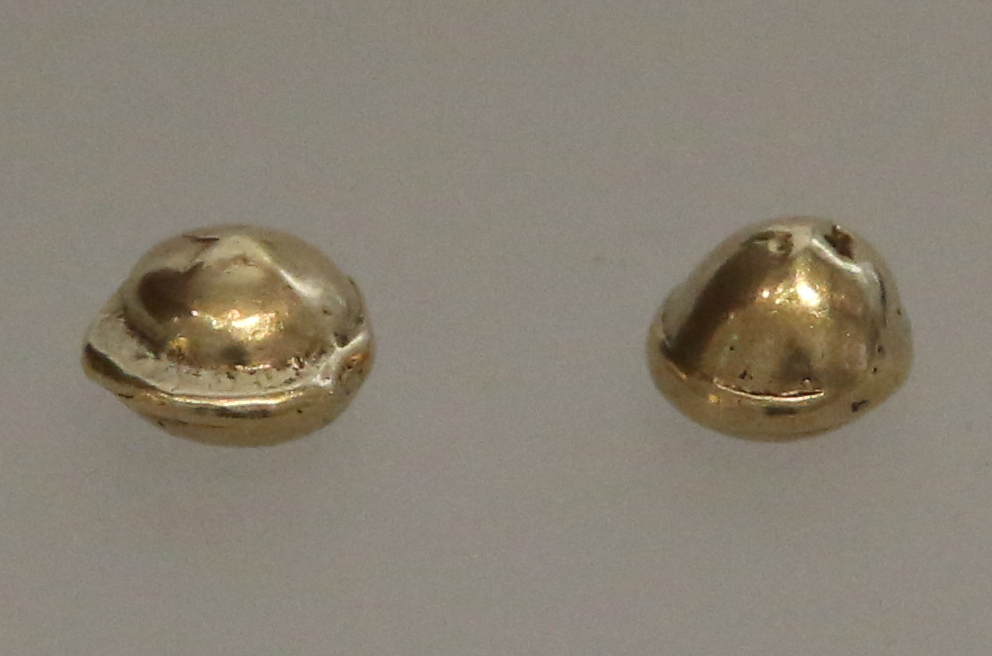
Two of the Globules à la Croix from the Netherurd hoard

As of 1997 there had been 7 finds of Celtic-era coins in Scotland. Five of these are poorly documented or could credibly be modern (or in one case 19th century) losses. Of the remaining two one is a single South Ferriby stater found in Lauderdale. The other is a hoard, found near Netherurd, that contained forty-plus Globules à la Croix (bullet coins) along with a number of gold torcs. The coins were struck in Gaul, possibly in an area to the north-east of Paris although the exact area is far from clear. Coins of this type were first struck around 200BC but remained in use until the Roman occupation. It has been suggested that their presence in Scotland is due to direct political or military contact.

=== Post-Celtic ===
With the defeat of the Iceni and the occupation of their territory the minting of Celtic coinage came to an end; the cast coins of Hengistbury Head may have continued a few years longer. Some coin production of an unclear level of officialdom had already restarted in occupied areas. After the first wave of Roman occupation in AD 43 low quality copies of asses appear to have been produced, possibly to make up for a lack of low denomination coins being imported from mints in Rome. This appears to have stopped by the AD 70s.

Further production of unclear and possibly varying officialdom took place with the production of cast copies of silver denarii around the year 200. Official minting would not begin again until Carausius set up mints after the Carausian Revolt in 286.

Celtic coins have appeared in archaeological deposits dated to long after minting ceased. For example, a single silver unit was found along with 4 sceattas in a deposit near Birchington-on-Sea that has been dated to around 600.
