= Warren Hill, Bournemouth =

Hill in Dorset, England

Warren Hill
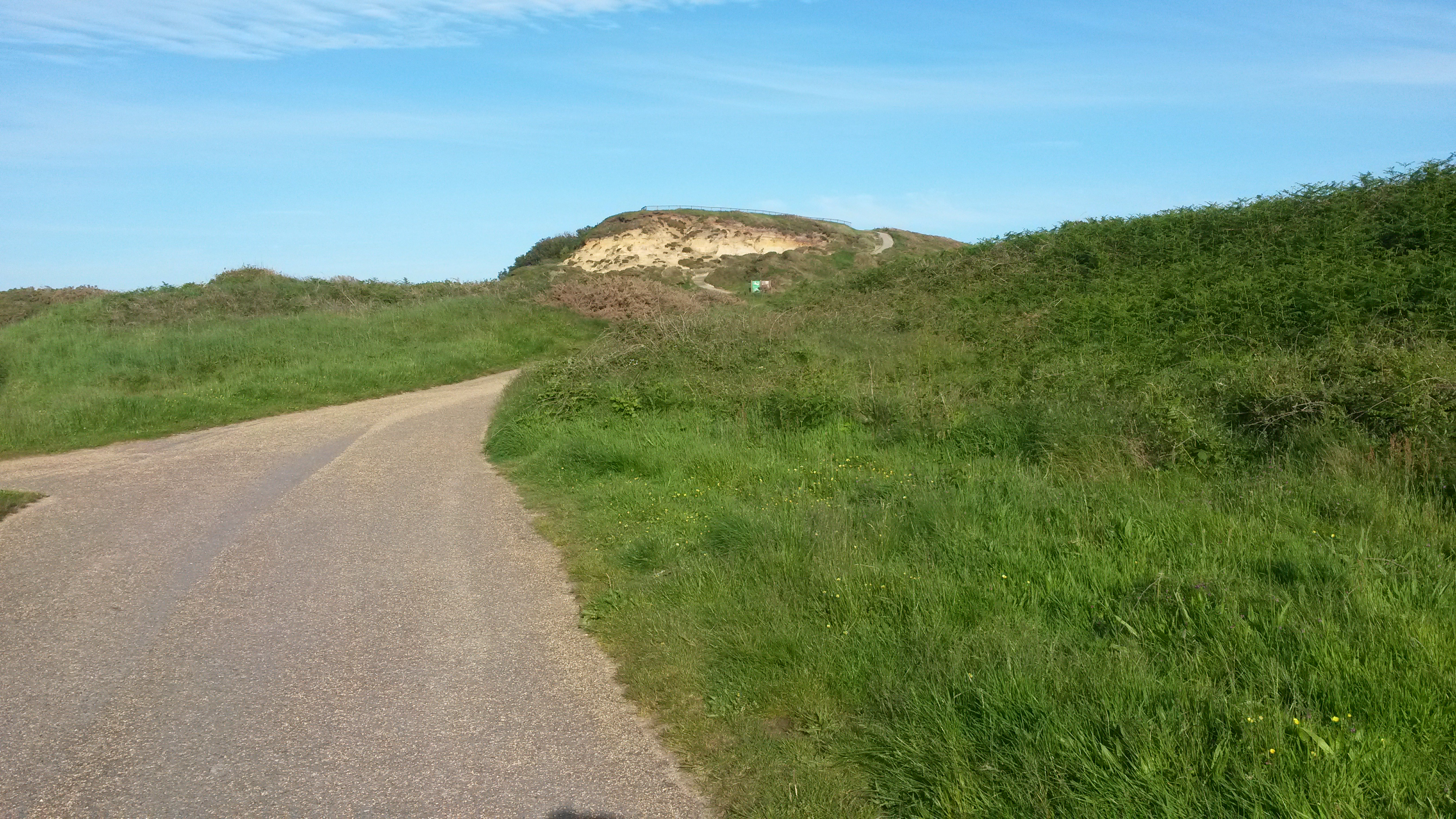
- Interactive map of Warren Hill
- 50°42′53.17″N 1°45′17.68″W
- Type: SSSI, Ancient Monument, Local Nature Reserve
- Periods: Stone Age, Bronze Age and Iron Age
- Location: Near Christchurch
- Region: Dorset, England

Site notes
- Condition: Well preserved

Warren Hill is the elevated part of Hengistbury Head in Dorset, England, overlooking Christchurch to the North and dominating Poole Bay to the West. With finds stretching back over 10,000 years, it is a site of international importance in terms of its archaeology and is scheduled both as an Ancient Monument, and a Local Nature Reserve. The head and its surroundings form part of the Christchurch Harbour Site of Special Scientific Interest. Wind-pruned hummocks of heather cover the plateau of the hill, which is accessible to walkers all year round providing excellent views of the surrounding area, as well as an interesting heathland ecosystem for students of nature.

== History ==
The Hengistbury Head site is archaeologically important and has been used by mankind for a long time stretching from the Paleolithic to the present day where the site is visited by over a million people a year. Warren Hill has a variety of remains and features dating from around 10,000 BC until Roman times. The hill's commanding view of the surroundings, coupled with an array of varied habitats nearby, provide the area with qualities appealing to both prehistoric and modern man.

Ploughing of Warren Hill in 1913 revealed thousands of flint implements covering the entire Stone Age period. Of particular archaeological interest were several blades rarely seen in the UK outside of caves; such blades are typically found at Upper Paleolithic sites across Europe, but open-air UK sites of such age are extremely rare. Further excavations identified over 600 tools, dominated by backed blades, endscrapers and burins. There are several barrow mounds on the hill that have been investigated previously, as well as traces of small defensive trenches from the Second World War. Much of the Head has been lost over the years due to the effects of sea, weather, and the removal of many "doggers" (ironstone boulders), causing the loss of several bloomery hearths and a Mesolithic campsite.

== Flora and fauna ==
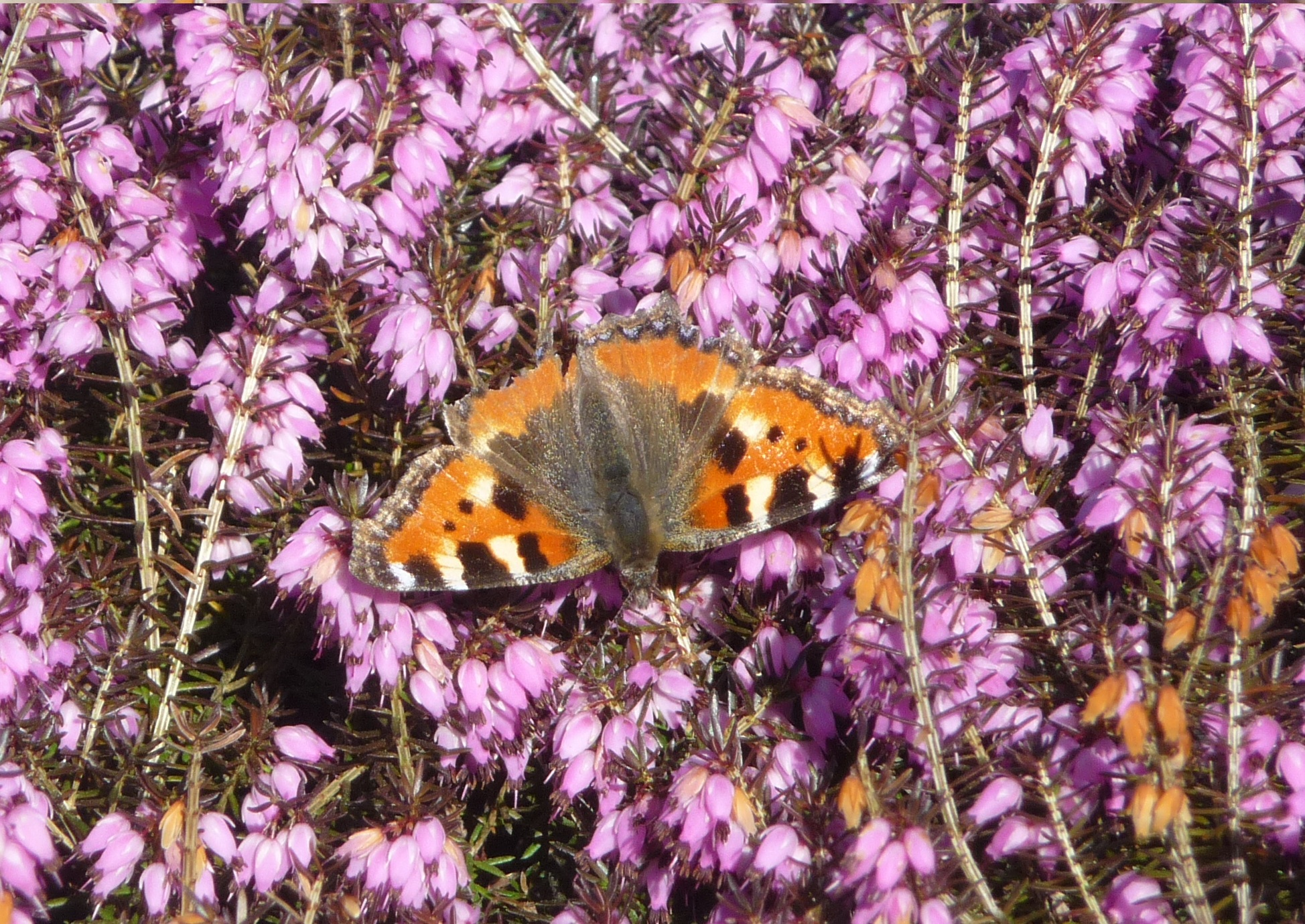
A small tortoiseshell on Erica

Warren Hill provides an important heathland habitat covered by the United Kingdom Biodiversity Action Plan. The hill immediately overlooks Withybed Wood, itself an important ecosystem and migratory point. Hengistbury Head was declared a Local Nature Reserve in 1990; the heathland in particular is designated as both a Special Area of Conservation and a Special Protection Area, part of a network of the best wildlife sites in Europe. The plateau is dominated by ling (common heather), with heather-bell found in the drier soils and cross-leaved heath in wetter areas. Dwarf gorse and tormentil give the area a touch of extra colour. Sundews, carnivorous plants that supplement their diet by trapping and devouring insects, can be observed in the boggy areas.

Meadow pipit and skylark thrive there. There are typically five breeding pairs of skylark and nine pairs of meadow pipit as well as three pairs of Dartford warbler. The area is home to the nocturnal violet ground beetle, and the powerful daytime predator, the green tiger beetle. Along with spiders, the beetles of Warren Hill provide visiting birds with a regular source of food. Exposed sandy areas attract burrowing sand wasps and other mining species such as the nationally scarce nomad bee, the large velvet ant and the cuckoo bee. The adder and the common lizard also have established populations up on the hill.

== See also ==
- Hengistbury Head
- Heathland
- Withybed Wood
- Poole Bay
