= Cast coinage =

Production of metal coins using a mold

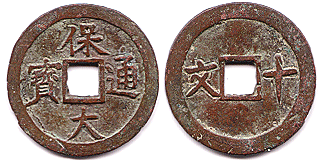
Vietnamese Bao Dai Thong Bao, last of its type minted in 1933

Cast coinage refers to coins made by pouring melted metal into a mold, i.e. casting. It has been used for regular coins, particularly in East Asia, but also other areas on a smaller scale (e.g. the ancient Mediterranean world). The method differs from the current mode of coin production, which is done by striking coin blanks that have been cut out of metal sheets. The method has also been used by forgers.

Traditional Far Eastern cast coins—so-called 'cash coins'—are the most famous example of cast coinage, and were issued from the 4th century BC until c. 1912, predominantly in bronze, brass or iron. Traditional Far Eastern coins were generally cast base metal coins, although silver and gold bars were also manufactured, e.g. Chinese sycee, Japanese obans and kobans, and Vietnamese lang and tien.

Cast potins circulated in Kent from around 100 BC to around 50 BC. At a point during the first century of the Christian era, cast bronze coins were produced in Dorset with archaeological evidence pointing towards Hengistbury Head as the source.

By AD 200, cast copies of silver denarii were being produced in a number of areas of Britain. While these may have been straightforward forgeries the context in which some of the moulds have been found suggest there may have been at least some elements of semi officialdom.
