= Withybed Wood =

Woodland in Dorset, England

Coordinates: 50.717°N 1.757°W

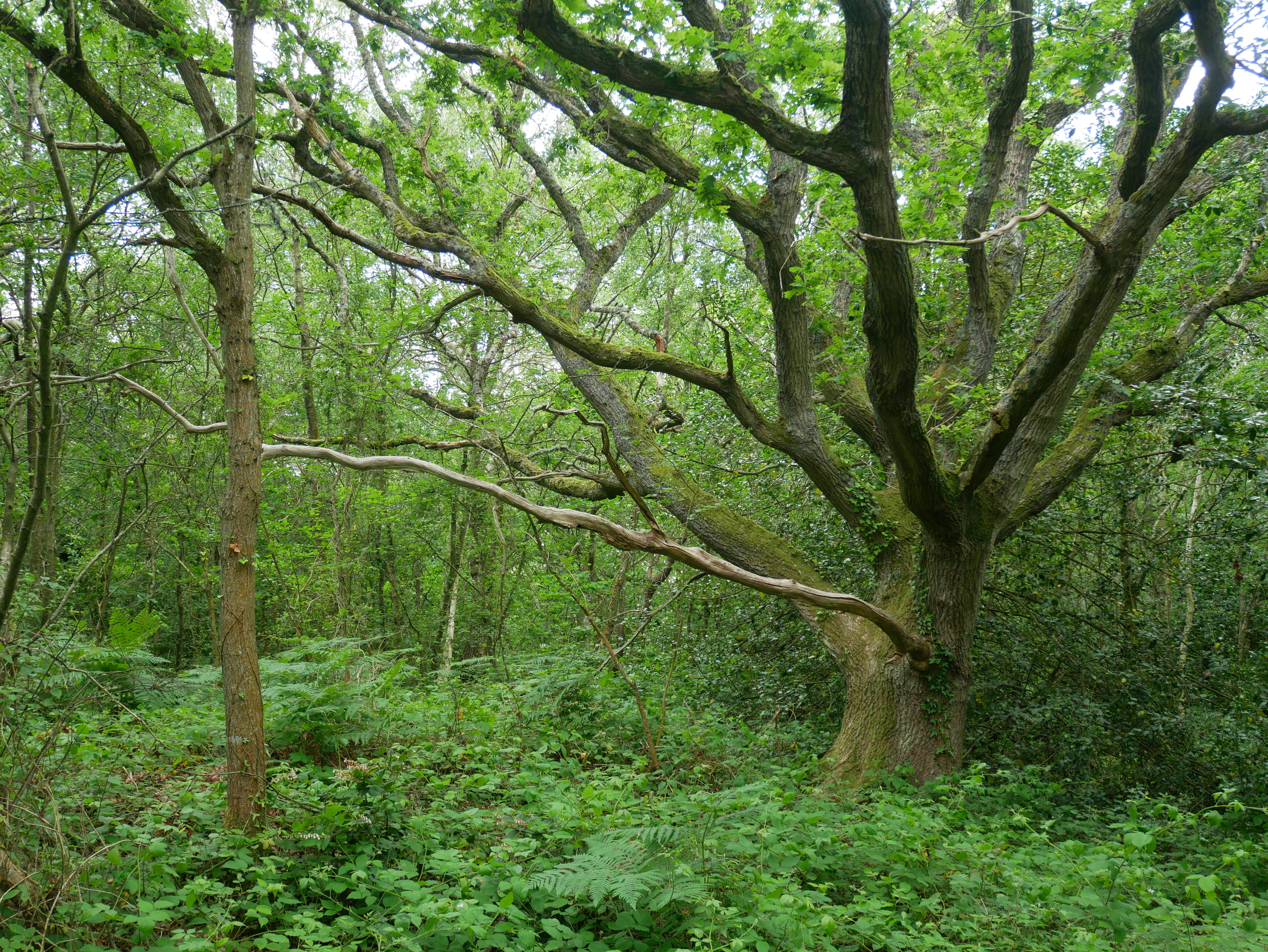
An oak tree in the northern part of Withybed Wood

Withybed Wood is a small, yet important patch of woodland located in the lee of Warren Hill, part of Hengistbury Head, Dorset. It is not to be confused with an area of the Wyre Forest in Shropshire, which also has the same name.

== Description ==
Part of Hengistbury Head Local Nature Reserve and the Christchurch Harbour Site of Special Scientific Interest, the wood has developed immediately north of the archaeologically and environmentally significant Warren Hill, sheltered from the sea breezes coming from the south and west over Poole Bay.

Despite its relatively small size; Withybed is of historic and natural interest; it is the only woodland area shown on an 1811 Ordnance Survey map of the Bournemouth/Christchurch region (the wildlife community also suggests that the woodland could be classified as "ancient semi-natural"), and because of its unique location, lying at the landfall and departure point for birds and other flying animals using the important Cherbourg - Avon valley migration route.

== Flora and fauna ==
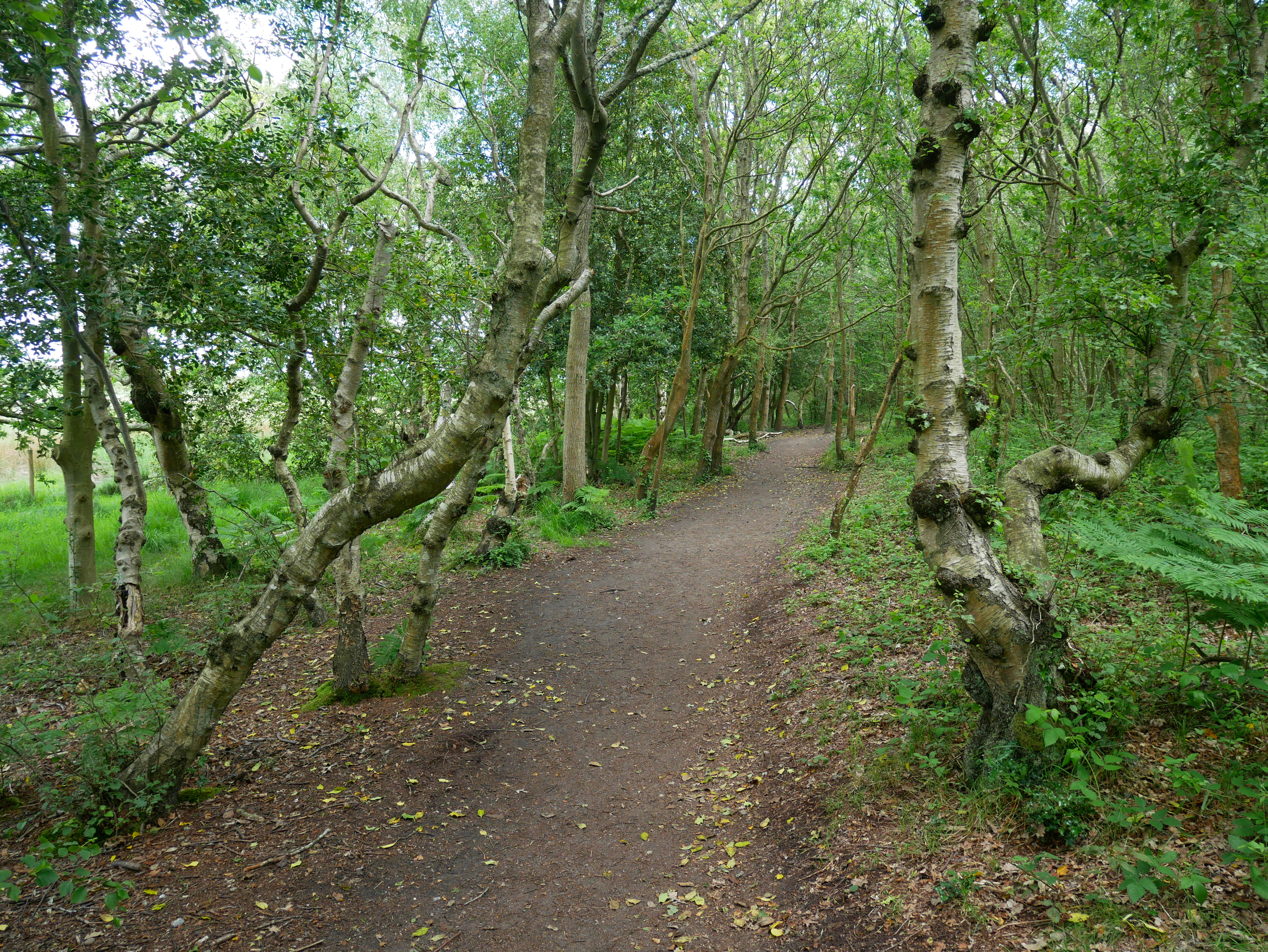
Path along the northern edge of Withybed Wood

Withybed Wood is home to a variety of tree species including downy birch, English oak and white poplar. Bluebells carpet the western fringe of the wood; foxglove and violets can be seen in the sunnier parts.

The trees at Withybed support various invertebrates, most visibly the butterflies, like the purple and green hairstreak or the speckled wood.

A recent bird census showed that the tawny owl, green woodpecker and sparrowhawk breed here either regularly or occasionally. Withybed is also home to, or visited by, the goldcrest the chiffchaff and blackcap amongst others.

== See also ==
- Hengistbury Head
- Warren Hill
