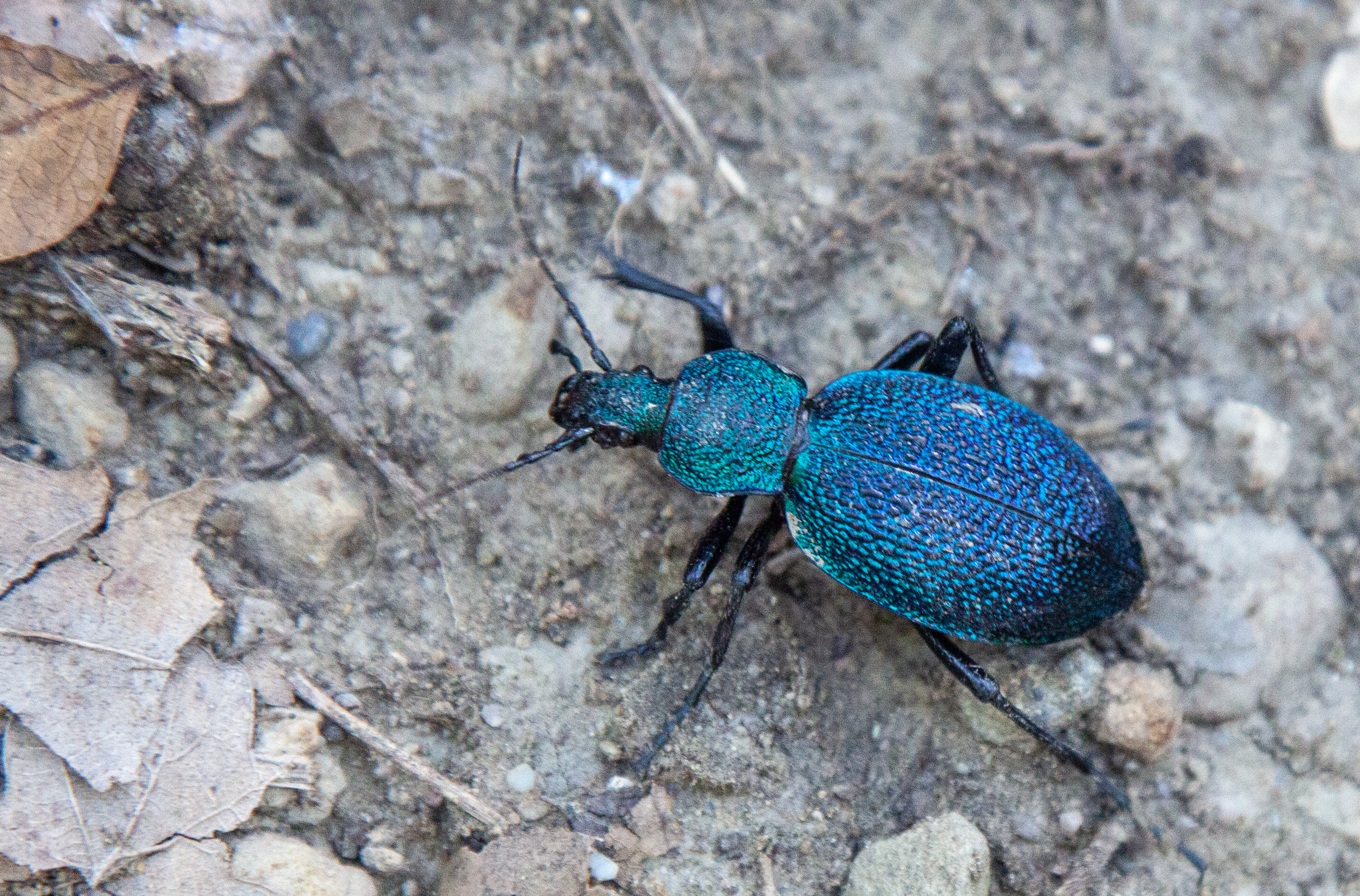
- Carabus scabrosus tauricus

Scientific classification
- Domain: Eukaryota
- Kingdom: Animalia
- Phylum: Arthropoda
- Class: Insecta
- Order: Coleoptera
- Suborder: Adephaga
- Family: Carabidae
- Genus: Carabus
- Species: C. scabrosus
- Subspecies: C. s. tauricus

Trinomial name
- Carabus scabrosus tauricus Bonelli, 1810

Synonyms
- Carabus aeneus Motschulsky, 1850; Carabus nigritulus Kraatz, 1876; Carabus purpureus Kraatz, 1876; Carabus viridissimus Kraatz, 1876

= Carabus scabrosus tauricus =

Subspecies of beetle

Carabus scabrosus tauricus is a subspecies of the beetle Carabus scabrosus endemic to Crimea.

Body length up to 52 mm. Colour variable from the blue, passing into violet to green or almost black. The downside is black, with a metallic sheen. Elytra and pronotum wrinkled, granular structure. Crimean beetle forms several forms, differing mainly painting.

Active at different times of day. Quickly run. Predator, feeding on terrestrial molluscs - mainly land snail. Eating bugs do not bite the snail shell, shellfish and eating away dipping his head and pronotum at the mouth of the shell. Well-fed beetles can burrow into the soil for a few days.
