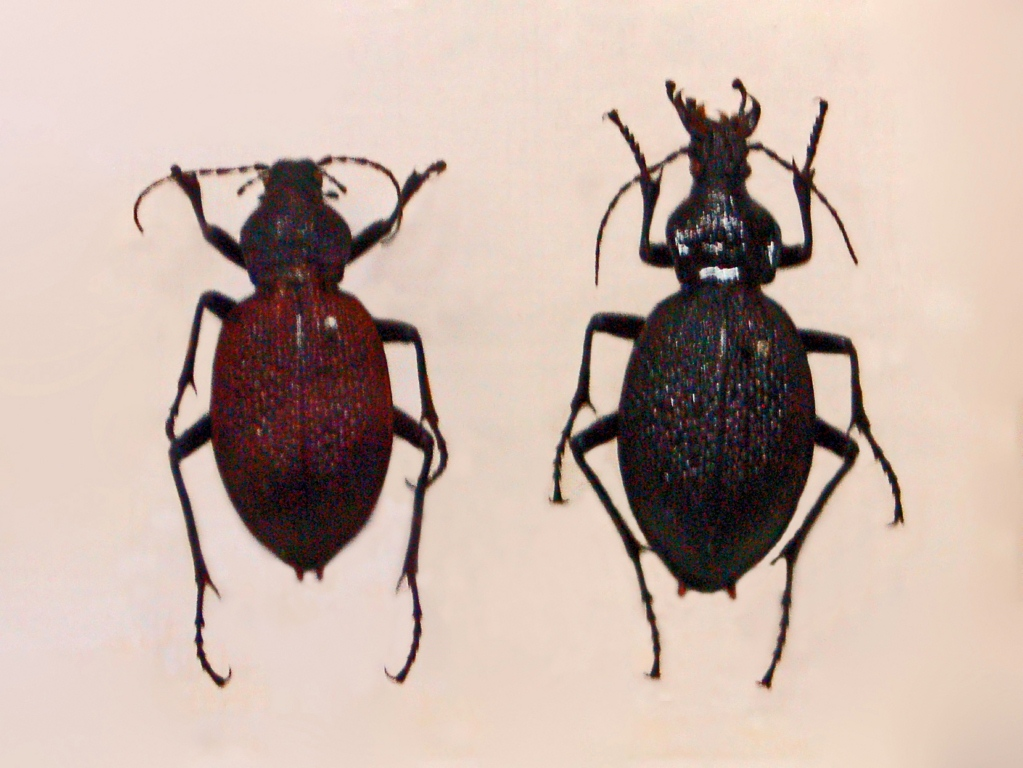
- Carabus scabrosus colchicus, at National Museum (Prague)

Scientific classification
- Kingdom: Animalia
- Phylum: Arthropoda
- Clade: Pancrustacea
- Class: Insecta
- Order: Coleoptera
- Suborder: Adephaga
- Family: Carabidae
- Genus: Carabus
- Species: C. scabrosus

Binomial name
- Carabus scabrosus Olivier, 1795

Synonyms
- Procerus scabrosus Olivier, 1795

= Carabus scabrosus =

Species of beetle

Carabus scabrosus, common name huge violet ground beetle, is a species of beetle of the family Carabidae.

== Description ==
Carabus scabrosus can reach about 50 millimetres (2.0 in) in length and about 30 millimetres (1.2 in) in width in the broadest part of elytra. This is among the largest of the known Carabus beetles. The basic colour varies from bluish-black to violet or dark reddish brown. Black varieties of the beetle typically also show a high absorption in the near-infrared part of the spectrum.

The thorax is broad, truncated anteriorly and posteriorly, very slightly convex. The elytrtra are oval, convex, and covered throughout with small tubercles. Also, the pronotum has a rugose, granular surface.

== Subspecies ==
- Carabus scabrosus akbesianus Breuning, 1975
- Carabus scabrosus amasicus Csiki, 1927
- Carabus scabrosus armenius Zaitzev, 1930
- Carabus scabrosus audouini Brullé, 1835
- Carabus scabrosus bakurianicola Rataj, 2018
- Carabus scabrosus bureschianus Breuning, 1928
- Carabus scabrosus callipygius Cavazzuti, 1986
- Carabus scabrosus caucasicus Adams, 1817
- Carabus scabrosus colchicus Motschulsky, 1844
- Carabus scabrosus culminicola (Cavazzuti, 1989)
- Carabus scabrosus dardanellicus Kraatz, 1886
- Carabus scabrosus demiddelaerae Rataj, 2018
- Carabus scabrosus elbursianus Mandl, 1958
- Carabus scabrosus estegeicus (Cavazzuti, 1989)
- Carabus scabrosus fallettianus (Cavazzuti, 1997)
- Carabus scabrosus farnazae Deuve, 2006
- Carabus scabrosus ispiratus Cavazzuti, 1986
- Carabus scabrosus mentor Blumenthal & Breuning, 1967
- Carabus scabrosus montisabanti Schweiger, 1962
- Carabus scabrosus munzurensis Cavazzuti & Lassalle, 1987
- Carabus scabrosus propinquus Csiki, 1927
- Carabus scabrosus scabrosus Olivier, 1795
- Carabus scabrosus schuberti Breuning, 1968
- Carabus scabrosus sommeri Mannerheim, 1844
- Carabus scabrosus sterilis Bodemeyer, 1915
- Carabus scabrosus tauricus Bonelli, 1810
- Carabus scabrosus weidneri (Lassalle, 1990)
