= Potin =

Metal alloy

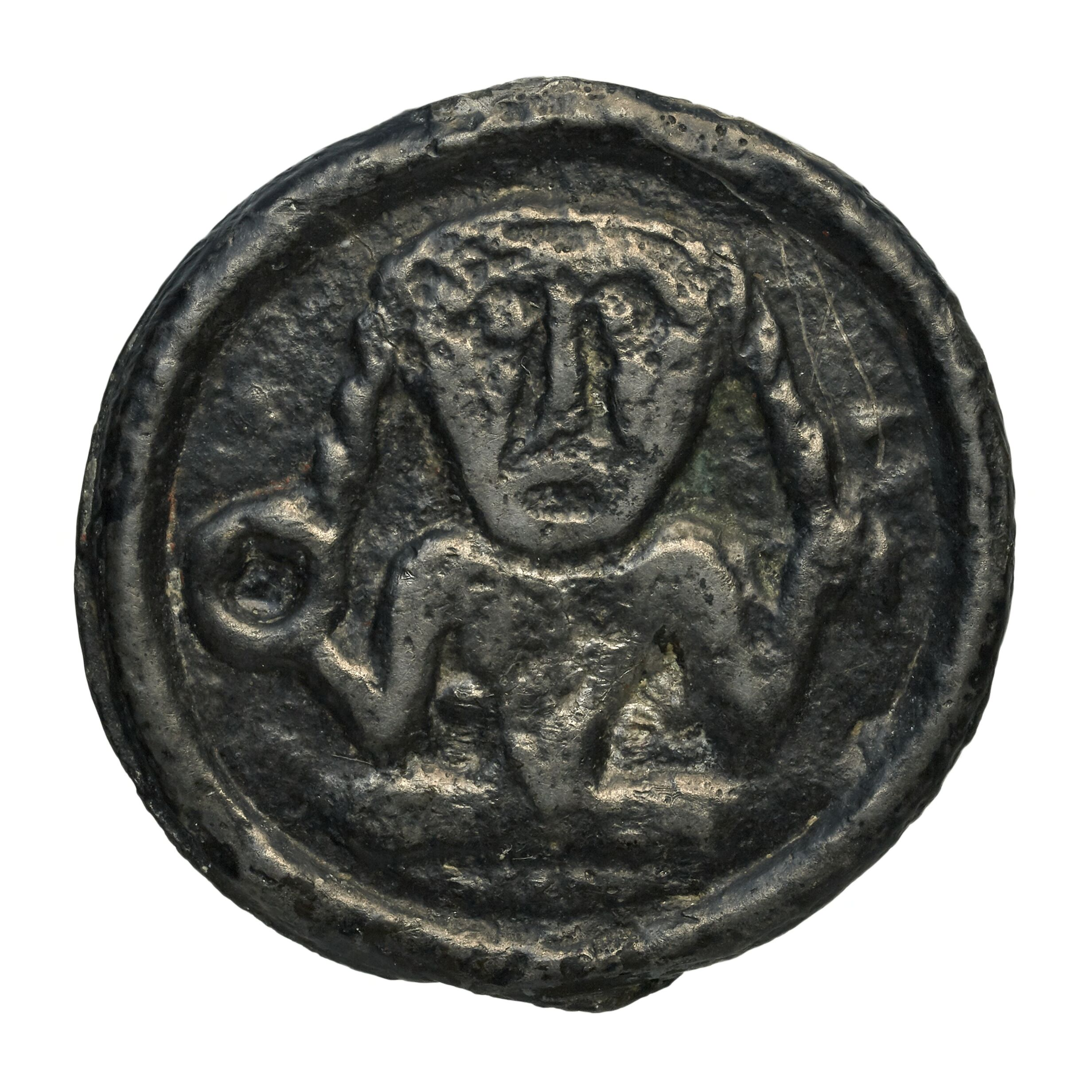
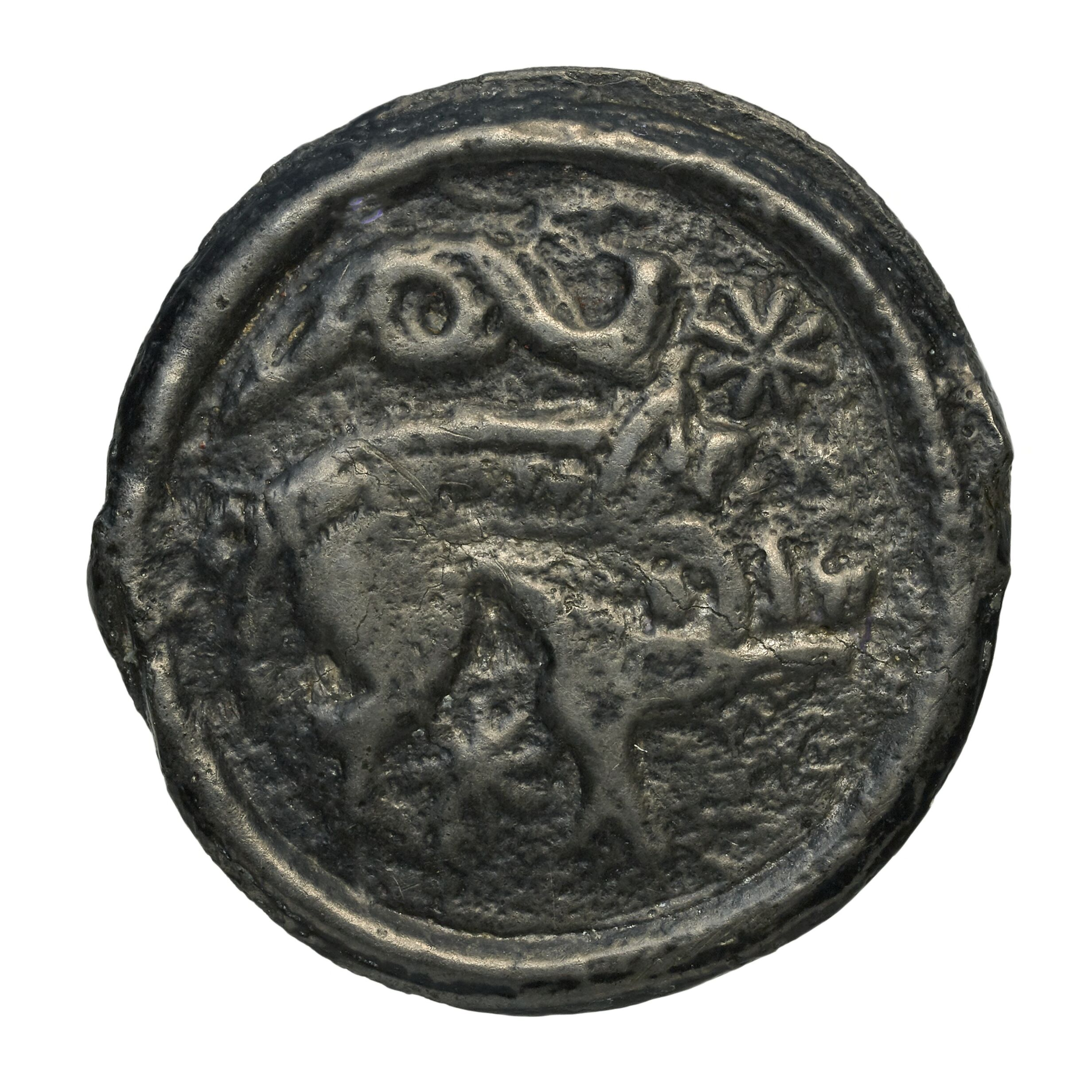
Potin of the Remi, a Gallo-Belgic people of northeast Gaul: crosslegged figure holding a torc on the obverse, with a boar, a coiled serpent, and two stars on the reverse

In numismatics, potin is a base metal alloy used in coins. Typically, it is a mixture of copper, tin and lead in varying proportions, without significant precious metals. The term "potin" is usually applied to Celtic coinage.

== Eastern Celts ==
In 1890, so-called "potin lumps" (Potinklumpen) were found at the prehistoric pile dwelling settlement Alpenquai in Zürich (Vicus Turicum), Switzerland. The pieces consist of a large number of fused Celtic coins, which are mixed with charcoal remnants. The largest weighs 59.2 kilograms (131 lb). Some of the about 18,000 coins originate among Celtic-speaking or Celtic-adjacent peoples in the easternmost part of Gaul, and others are of the Zürich type, dated to around 100 BC and attributed to the local Helvetii. The find is so far unique. Scientific research suggests that the melting down of the lump was not completed, and it is postulated that the aim was to form cult offerings. The site of the find was at that time at least 50 metres (164 ft) from the shore of Lake Zurich, and probably 1 metre (3 ft) to 3 metres (10 ft) deep in the water.

== British potins ==
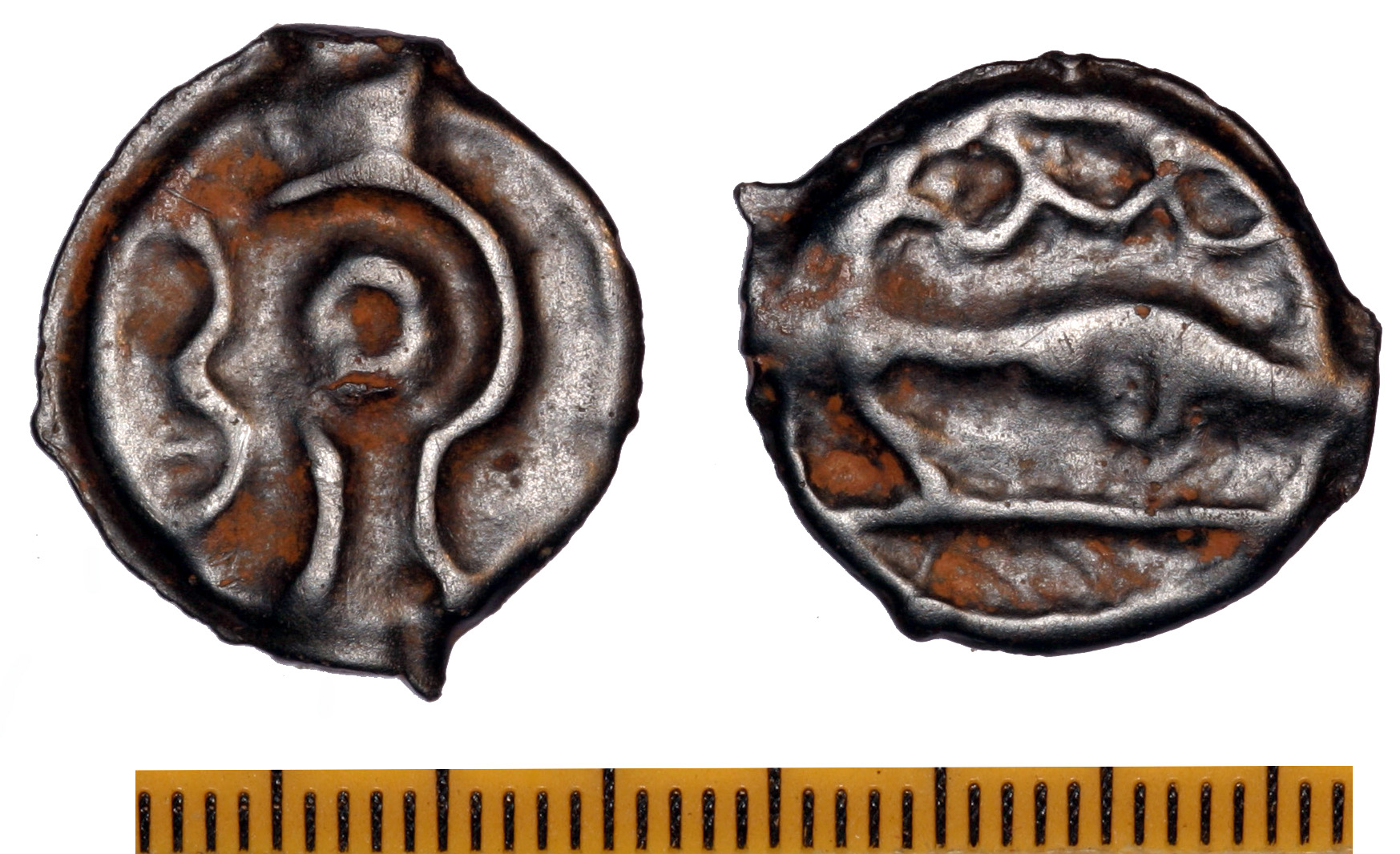
Class I potin ('Thurrock' type), c. 100 BC, from Iron Age Britain

Kentish cast bronzes (historically called 'Thurrock potins') dating from the end of the second century BC appear to have been the first coins made in Britain and to have circulated mainly in Kent. Like many coinages among the Continental Celts, they ultimately derive from design typologies of the Greek colony of Massalia (present-day Marseille, in southern France), perhaps indirectly through Gallic intermediaries.

== See also ==
- Billon (alloy)
- Coinage metals
- Tin coinage
