= British Iron Bar currency =

First currency used in Britain

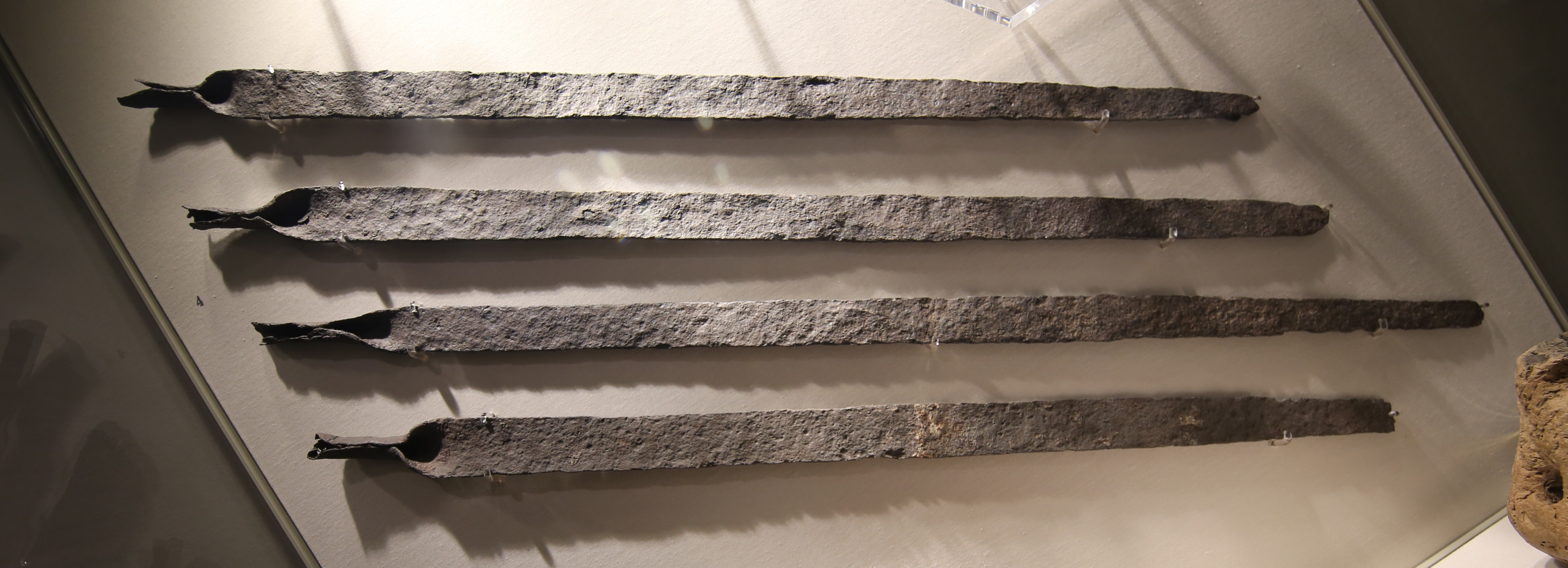
Sword type Iron bar currency

British iron bar currency was a form of currency consisting of iron bars that appears to have been the first currency used in Britain. Iron currency bars first appeared around 200BC. Finds at Hod Hill suggest that the Iron bar currency stopped being used as coins were adopted.

Currency bars have been found in four forms known as sword-shaped, spit shaped, plough-shaped and bay-leaf-shaped. It has been suggested that these shapes were used to show the origin of the bars. The bars generally weigh between 0.5 and 0.3 kg Spit shaped bars are the most commonly found representing half of all finds. Sword shaped bars make up another 40 percent.

Iron currency bars have been found in some numbers in hill-forts With 27 being found at Hod Hill. The bars found at Danebury appear to have been in the process of being processed into goods. A hoard of 394 bars found at Meon Hill hillfort in 1824 marked the beginning of modern awareness of the currency bars.

What appears to be iron bar currency was mentioned in Julius Caesar's Commentarii de Bello Gallico. There are variances in the surviving texts meaning that it is possible the original text was referring to iron ring money. However iron bar currency is considered more likely in the light of archaeological discoveries of bars.

== Types and distribution ==
The different types of bar have been found with varying frequency across England.

Type	Mainly found	Image
Sword-shaped	Hampshire, Dorset, along the Jurassic Way and onto the Humber	
Spit shaped	Cotswolds, Somerset	
Plough-shaped	Thames Valley, Kent, Midlands	
Bay-leaf-shaped	Cambridgeshire	
