= Hengistbury Head =

Headland and archeological site in Dorset

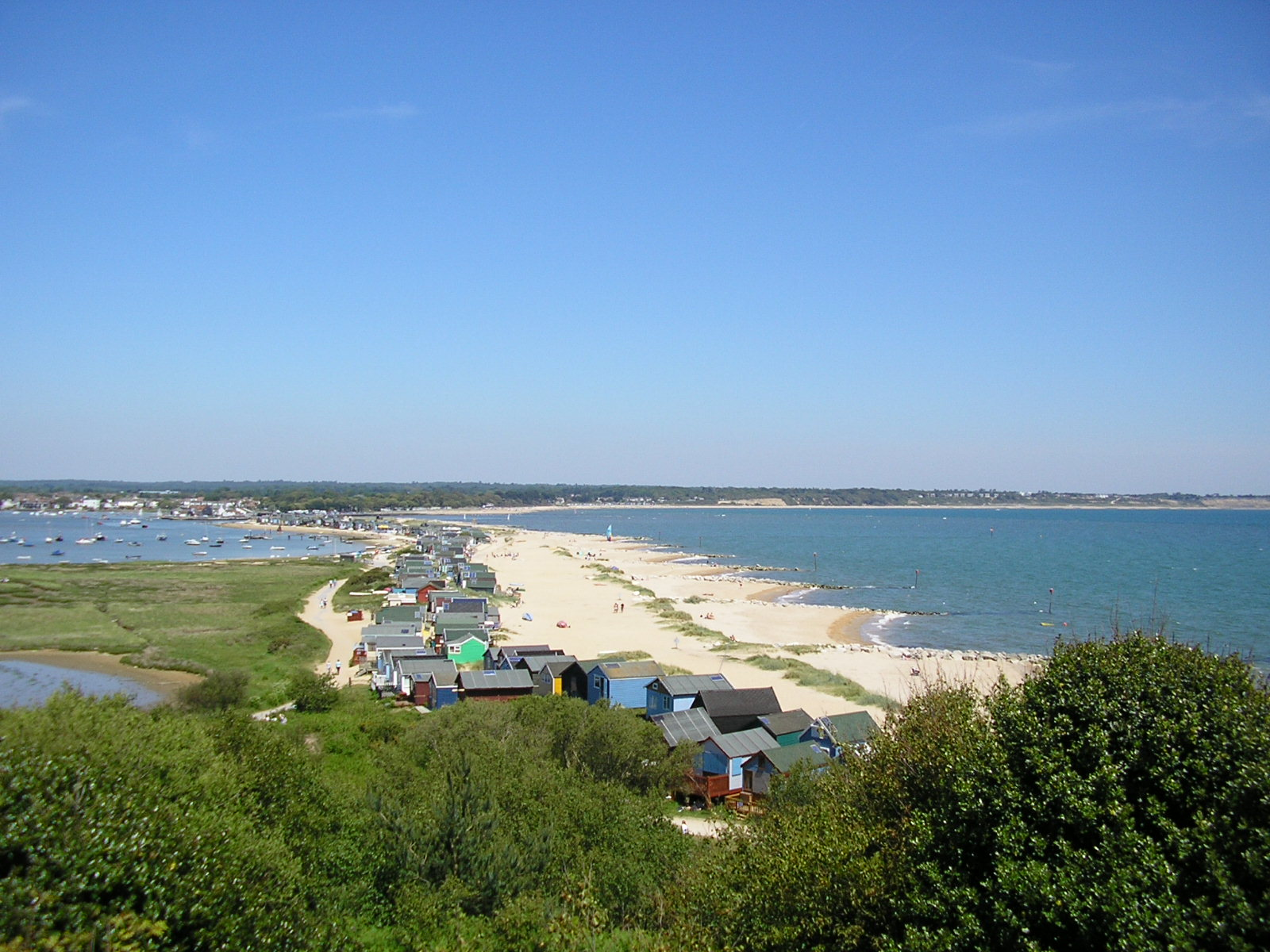
- View from Warren Hill overlooking Mudeford Spit
- Interactive map of Hengistbury Head
- 50°42′57″N 1°45′14″W
- Type: Ancient Monument, Local Nature Reserve, SSSI
- Periods: Stone Age, Bronze Age and Iron Age
- Location: near Christchurch
- Region: Dorset, England

Site notes
- Condition: Well preserved

Hengistbury Head (/ˈhɛŋɡɪstbəri/), formerly also called Christchurch Head, is a headland jutting into the English Channel between Bournemouth and Mudeford in the English county of Dorset. It is a site of international importance in terms of its archaeology and is scheduled as an Ancient Monument. Declared a Local Nature Reserve in 1990, the head and its surroundings form part of the Christchurch Harbour Site of Special Scientific Interest. It is also a Special Area of Conservation, Special Protection Area, an Environmentally Sensitive Area and a Site of Nature Conservation Interest. The name "Hengistbury Head" refers to the whole of the headland area; the elevated portion is called Warren Hill.

There has been human activity on the site since the Upper Palaeolithic. During the Victorian era, it was heavily quarried, and in recent years tourism has become significant – it receives more than one million visitors annually. The various habitats on the Head provide a home for many plants, birds and insects, some of them rare and critically endangered. Erosion remains a threat to the site, although long-term projects are intended to secure it for the future.

== Location ==
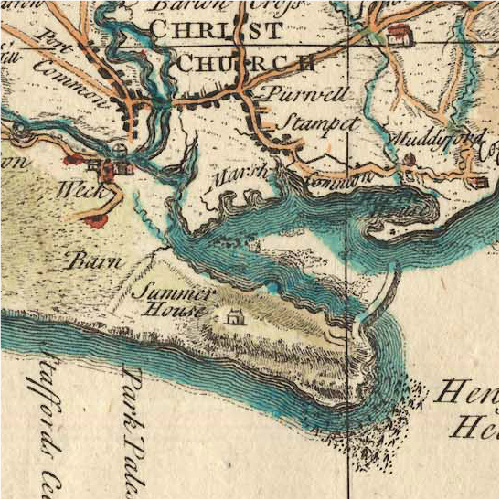
Hengistbury Head as shown in Isaac Taylor's Map of Hampshire, 1759. The isolated building near the centre of the image (labelled "Summer House") is the thatched barn still at the head.

Hengistbury Head is a sandstone headland attached to Southbourne, which is a suburb of the town of Bournemouth to the west; the nearest major settlement is Christchurch to the north. It is the most easterly part of the Borough of Bournemouth, and marks the most easterly point of Poole Bay. Historically part of Hampshire, the Local Government Act 1972 designated the area a part of Dorset. The northern slope of the hill tailing off towards the sea forms Mudeford spit, the sand bar closing Christchurch Harbour from the south.

== Buildings ==
The spit is home to more than 300 privately owned beach-huts, which are some of the UK's most expensive. In 2015 five of the huts were put on the market for a combined asking price of £1 million. On average the huts measure around five by three metres, have no running water, and staying overnight is only permitted from March through October. Despite the relative lack of amenities, the area has become one of the UK's most desirable; huts are rented out for up to £600 a week.

The Black House, a local landmark, stands at the end of the spit, opposite Mudeford Quay, site of the Battle of Mudeford in 1784. Built in 1848, it was once a boatbuilders' house, but is now rented out to holidaymakers. It has served a variety of functions over the years, and is commonly (but inaccurately) associated with the area's smuggling past.

== Toponymy ==
Recorded as Hedenesburia in an early 12th century deed in the Christchurch Priory cartulary. In the mid-17th century it was referred to as Hynsebury in State Papers. The modern spelling of Hengistbury is found on Isaac Taylor's 1759 map of Hampshire. In 1779, the antiquary Francis Grose mistakenly speculates in a letter to the amateur scientist Gustavus Brander, who resided at Christchurch, that the headland might be named after the legendary Jutish leader Hengist. During the period of what archaeologist Barry Cunliffe calls "antiquarian romanticism", many prehistoric sites were renamed to link them with historical figures. It was thought at the time that Hengist could be buried at Hengistbury as he was said to have been laid to rest in an unlocated mound. However, 20th century excavations have established that the tumuli on Hengistbury Head date to the Bronze Age.

Linguist Richard Coates speculates that the name is derived from Heddin's Fort.

== History ==
Hengistbury Head is home to a plethora of nationally and internationally significant archaeological sites, with features dating from the Late Upper Palaeolithic to the Roman settlement of Britain, earning the site Scheduled Ancient Monument status. Interest in the site declined throughout the Dark Ages, until extensive development took place in Christchurch around 890 AD, when the Head may have been used as a lookout post. The area was heavily quarried during the Victorian period and nowadays receives over a million visitors annually.

=== Stone Age ===
Several archaeological digs have revealed that the site was occupied during the Upper Palaeolithic. There is evidence of an open settlement of the Creswellian culture on the hill in the middle of the headland dating to around 14,100 years ago. With over 13,000 lithic artefacts it is probably the largest site of the period. Most interesting were several blades typically found at Upper Paleolithic sites across Europe, but rarely seen outside of caves in the UK, where open air sites of this age are extremely rare. People at the Head were heavily involved with the production of blades, further excavations identified 649 tools, dominated by backed blades, endscrapers and burins.

At the time the Warren Hill would have overlooked a large river valley that was to become the English Channel. Once the sea had inundated the surrounding valley, Mesolithic hunter gatherers exploited the site. Pollen analysis of peat from the Solent bed suggest a lightly wooded headland free of close-knit undergrowth during this period, an ideal habitat for game.

=== Bronze Age ===
In Bronze Age Britain this was an important seaport. Eleven Bronze Age Britain round barrows sit on the promontory with two more a little further inland. Eleven of the round barrows were excavated; three by Bushe Fox in 1911–12 and eight by Harold St George Gray in 1919 and 1922. Two appear to be undisturbed. Numerous finds including Early Bronze Age axes and cremation urns were recovered from these tumuli, which have been consistently found to be between 3500 and 4000 years old.

One of the barrows (south of where the thatched barn now stands) contained a high status cremation of a woman of about twenty years in age, accompanied by an incense cup, a halberd-style pendant made from amber and copper alloy, and two gold cones that would have covered buttons of an organic material. The burial-goods recovered are similar to those of the Wessex culture, the Wilsford and Dorset Ridgeway series in particular. An urn from one of the barrows likely to have been made between 1700 and 1500 B.C., has been identified as Trevisker Ware, a type widely found throughout Devon and Cornwall which was transported east in lesser amounts, this find being one of the easternmost discovered.

=== Iron Age ===
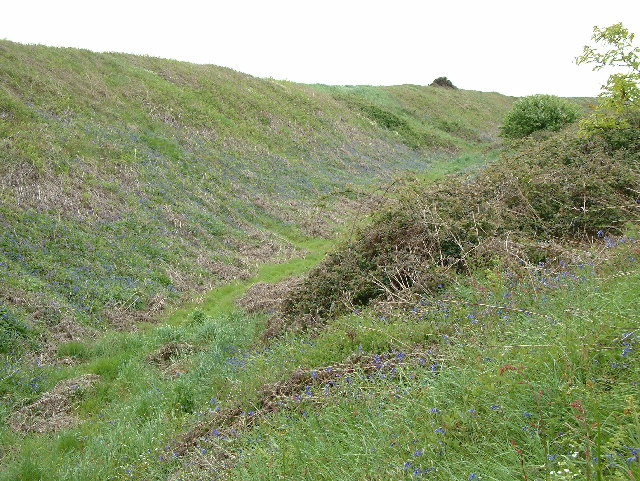
"Double Dykes", Hengistbury Head

In Iron Age Britain around 700 BC, a settlement on the Head was established; also around this time, the headland was cut off from the mainland by the construction of two banks and ditches called the Double Dykes, similar to those found at Maiden Castle. The earthworks consisted of an inner bank three metres high, with a ditch three and a half metres deep. An outer ditch six metres wide and two metres in depth is now obscured due to wind-blown deposits of sand and a gradual silting process. These defences turned Hengistbury Head into a fortified settlement area which seems to have grown over succeeding centuries until it became an important port. The Iron Age port at Hengistbury Head forms a final site in a small chain of fortified earthworks, starting from Hambledon Hill, and also including Hod Hill, Spetisbury Rings, Buzbury Rings, Badbury Rings and Dudsbury Camp.

John Lavender of the local Red House Museum noted evidence of small iron-ore smelting hearths on Warren Hill, while green vitreous slag has been also found on the Head. In his 1911 to 1912 excavations, Bushe-Fox found evidence for working of lead, copper and silver; two ingots discovered at this time revealed that raw materials would have been imported to the area. One ingot was of nearly pure copper, while the other, which weighed 8.6 kg, was roughly 50/50 copper-silver alloy with around one percent gold. Argentiferous (i.e. silver-bearing) copper was refined to produce silver at the Head. There are also indications that gold was worked at Hengistbury. One excavation produced part of a torc, twisted together with a small gold bracelet and another fragment in a manner suggesting it was scrap; a different site produced a streaked touchstone indicating use in gold testing.

Thousands of bronze coins have been found from the pre-Roman period, the vast majority having been struck by the Durotriges. The abundance of coins, together with various hearths and smelting artefacts found within a close proximity suggest that the Durotrigan finds were minted here.

==== International trade centre ====
The advanced level of metallurgy in the area, coupled with its ease of access from the Continent, meant that Hengistbury Head became a significant Late-Iron Age port; trading worked metal of iron, silver, and bronze in return for figs, glass, tools and other goods. Armorican coins and pottery uncovered here show links to the Brittany peninsula. Amphorae used for the transportation of North Italian wine have been found in such quantities (more than all other sites in the south of England put together), that it is clear that the Head was a main port of entry into the country. However, no similar amphorae have been unearthed in Armorica, hinting at a more direct trade route between Hengistbury Head and Italy. Most of these vessels date from before 50 B.C., while later styles are absent despite being common in other parts of Britain, indicating the wine trade seems to have declined at about the time Caesar began his Gaulish campaigns.

=== Roman occupation to Medieval period ===
After the Roman conquest, the south-east of England started to develop into a more urban economy, while the socio-economic system of the south-west remained little changed. Hengistbury would still have served as an important hub for the Dumnonii of Cornwall and Devon, and the Durotriges of Wiltshire and Dorset; since transport by water was more efficient at the time, and the Head offered both a coastal route, and freshwater options via the Stour and Avon rivers.

No evidence of Saxon use has been found at the Head. The area was not substantially reoccupied until Alfred the Great decided to rebuild the harbour as a defence against raiders. He built the town that later became Christchurch, on the north side of the harbour. Access to Salisbury up the River Avon made this a more strategic place. The Head may have been used for harbour defence at this time. In the 11th century, some of the iron-ore rich stones found at the Head were used in the construction of Christchurch Castle. These reddish-coloured stones can still be seen in the base of the now ruined castle.

=== 17th, 18th and 19th centuries ===
In the late 1600s, Andrew Yarranton (with backing from the Earl of Clarendon) commenced a scheme to improve the harbour. In 1693 a channel was cut out to sea, whilst ironstone boulders from the head were used to create a pier. The plans proved ineffective; the pier was poorly positioned and subsequent storms (including the Great Storm of 1703) soon undid most of the work although parts of the pier known as "Clarendon's Jetty" or the "Long Rocks" are still visible today. Many tons may have been removed from the beach and the head itself to make the jetty.

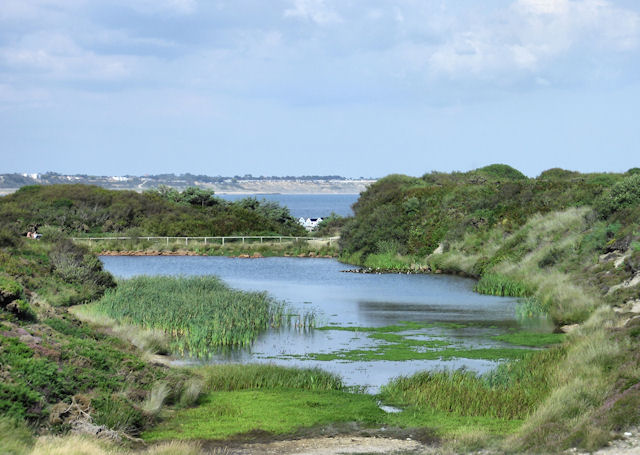
Old Ironstone Quarry, Hengistbury Head

In 1733 a new Excise and Customs Bill was introduced, restricting imports and raising taxes on many luxury items. Christchurch rapidly became a hot-bed for smugglers, where they were known as "freetraders", and much of the town was involved in the trade. The "Double Dykes" are said to have been used to hide contraband, while Mudeford spit is rumoured to have been used in the construction of "Guinea boats" (cheaply built galleys sometimes capable of outrunning the day's steamships). One apocryphal story is that the black house acquired its distinctive black colour when customs officers tried to smoke out some holed-up smugglers by lighting fires around the base. The house was constructed in 1848 and used by shipwrights as a dwelling and workshop, smuggling was in decline with the introduction of a free-trade policy and more effective measures being implemented by the Coast Guard by this time, so the house may not in fact have had much involvement in smuggling. The spit has a long association with shipbuilding with two large ships being built in the mid-19th century, the Viscountess Canning of 193 tons and the Enterprise 253 tons.

From 1848 to 1872, the Hengistbury Mining Company – formed by a Christchurch-based merchant, John E. Holloway – extracted many more ironstone boulders through quarrying. Holloway brought coal from Southampton, and took the ironstone as ballast for the return journey. These boulders, known as Iron Doggers, were prized for their high quantity of iron ore (up to 30%). They form the base of Hengistbury Head, and the removal of a substantial amount of doggers over the years has weakened the headland. These and earlier excavations resulted in a loss of up to a third of the head, caused mainly by erosion after the quarry's closure. The silt washed down also threatened the ecology of the saltmarsh below. This has been reduced by the building of a dam, in 1976, to create a pool. Many "doggers" can still be seen lining the route of the land-train and at the quarry.

=== UK's first airshow ===
In 1910 the first international aviation meeting ever held in Britain took place on a specially laid out aerodrome consisting of a mile of grassland between the "Double Dykes" and the nearby village of Tuckton. About twenty pioneer aviators from around the world participated in various competitions including spot landing, altitude tests and speed trials (both for the fastest and slowest circuit).

On the second day of the meeting, co-founder of Rolls-Royce and pioneer aviator Charles Rolls was thrown from his plane, which disintegrated beneath him. Despite the fact that the first-ever powered flight had occurred only seven years previously, Rolls had been attempting a precision landing. He died from his injuries shortly after his fall. The event was Britain's earliest fatal flying accident involving a powered aircraft.

=== 20th century ===
There were a number of development schemes for the head including a major railway and docks scheme proposed in 1885, proposals for housing and a golf course were also put forward before World War I, though none of these schemes came to fruition. In 1919 the head was sold by Sir George Meyrick to Harry Gordon Selfridge with plans to construct a grand house. These plans also came to nothing, apart from the establishment of a nursery garden. Bournemouth Borough Council purchased the head in 1930 for £25,200; although plans for housing existed west of double dykes, the head itself was to be kept as public open space. During World War II the head was closed to the public and was occupied by the army, becoming home to a number of installations including a radar station. The area was also extensively mined. The head was finally cleared of the military defences by the 1950s.

== Present day ==
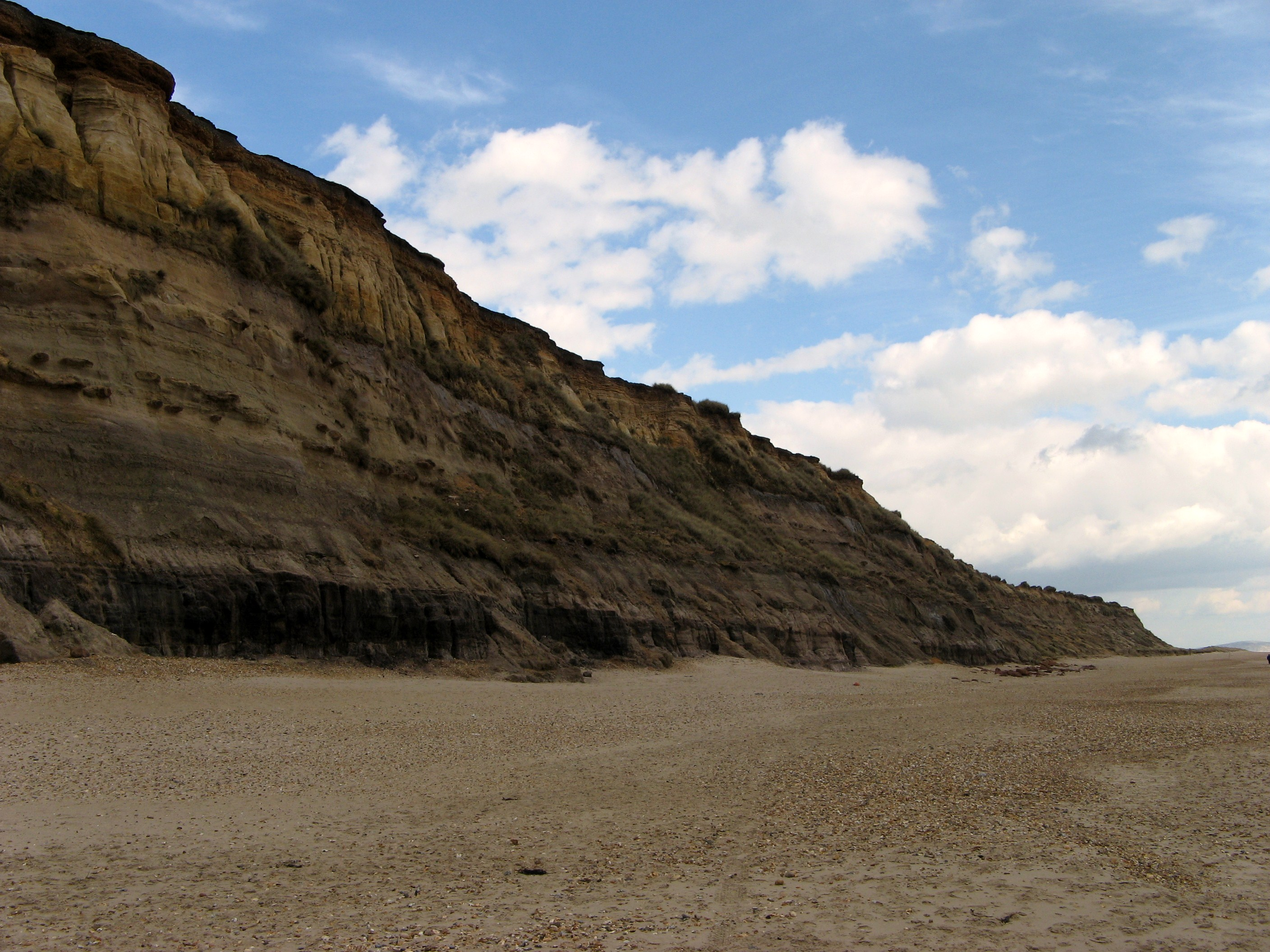
Warren Hill as seen from the beach, 2008

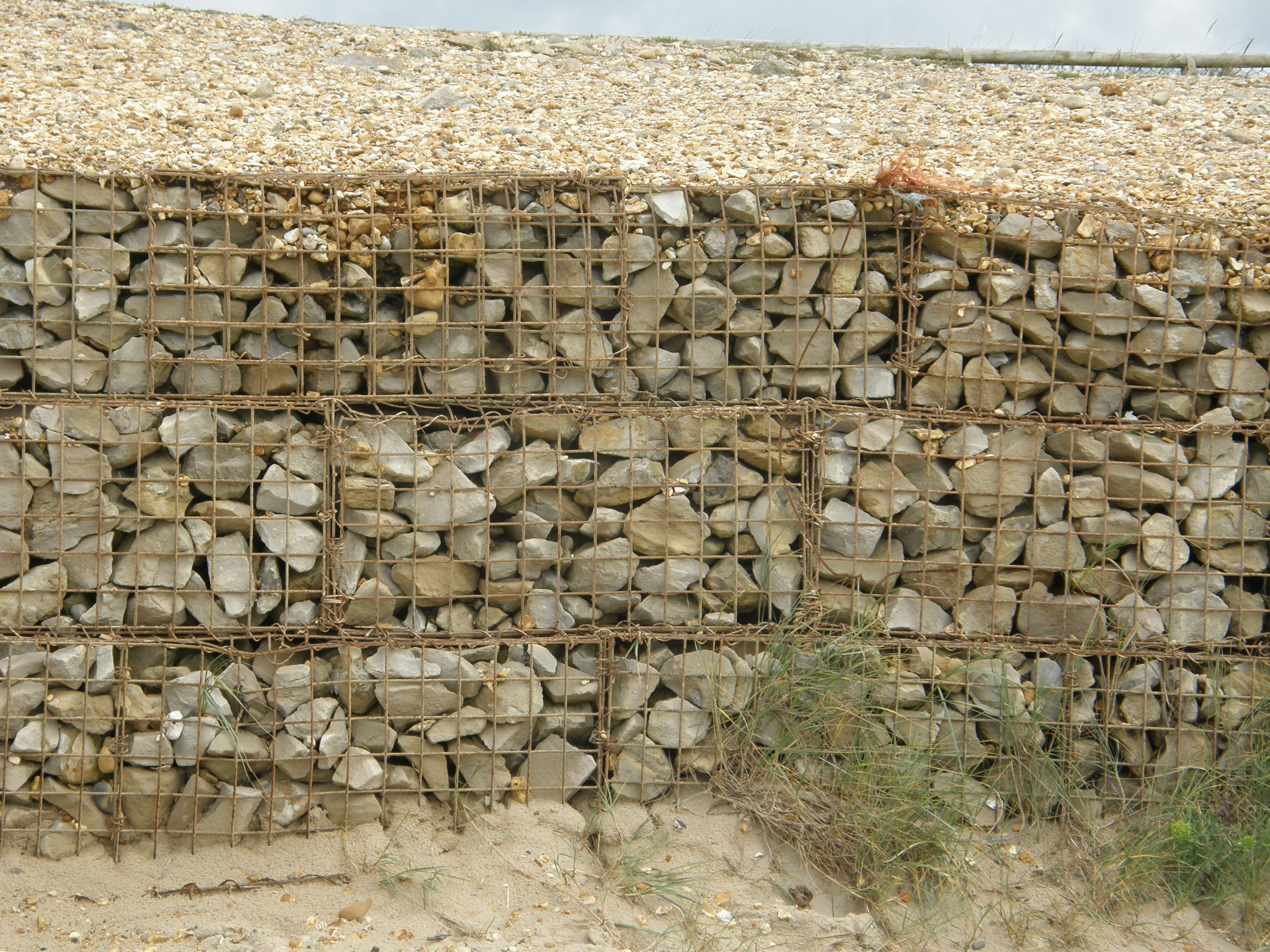
Gabions at Hengistbury Head

Hengistbury Head Local Nature Reserve is currently owned and managed by BCP Council. In 1990, the land was declared a Local Nature Reserve, as a commitment by the town of Bournemouth to conserve and enhance the environment. The heathland forms part of the Dorset Heaths and is internationally protected as a Special Area of Conservation and Special Protection Area. Nearby, the upper reaches of Christchurch Harbour (including the meadows at Wick) are recognised as an Environmentally Sensitive Area.

The head today is used for a variety of reasons. First, it is a tourist spot where country walks can be taken all over the head due to the well-defined gravel paths, some of which form part of the Bournemouth Coast Path. In 2008, many paths were resurfaced, making more (though not all) parts of the head wheelchair accessible. For example, it is now possible to gain wheelchair access to Quarry Pool. Regular field trips to the site are made by students of all ages and there are occasional guided tours or meetings around the head covering a wide variety of subjects.

There is a cafe at the bottom of the head on the Bournemouth side. Hengistbury Head Outdoor Education centre is located near here on the south shore of the harbour. Run by Brockenhurst College, the centre offers a variety of water and outdoor activities. A scenic land train (known as "the Noddy train") makes regular journeys from the cafe to the end of the spit, a journey of ten or so minutes. On the head itself is a H. M. Coastguard radio relay station, a nature reserve and a triangulation pillar, shown on Ordnance Survey maps as 36 metres above sea level. Ample parking (subject to charges) can be found near the cafe, but the head is also within walking distance of Southbourne and parts of Christchurch.

The Quarry Pool is now a significant part of the nature reserve features of the head. While it was very acidic in the early years, since 1990 it has allowed the growth of a significant number of plant and insect species, as well as mallard and little grebe. The insects provide valuable food for migrating sand martins and swallows.

=== Visitor centre ===
A new visitor centre for Hengistbury Head was opened in December 2013. The extant thatched barn was upgraded in an eco-friendly way and the new addition cost over a million pounds. Funds were provided by developer contributions, the Heritage Lottery Fund and £300,000 from landfill tax.

The centre houses a display area which documents the site's archaeology, ecology and geology, while work space has been created for volunteers and other community groups such as the Hengistbury Head Supporters Group, Residents' Association and Christchurch Harbour Ornithological Group. The public now have the chance to scrutinise a selection of the finds discovered at Hengistbury Head in the last century, and to interact with experienced staff, as well as providing them with the opportunity to become actively involved in the administration of the nature reserve.

The surrounding area has been extensively landscaped to create outdoor learning areas and a wildlife garden. Energy-saving features include photovoltaic panels for electricity and ground source heat pump for heating. A green roof (a living roof that is partially or completely covered with vegetation and a growing medium), is used to absorb rainfall and provide insulation. The centre is constructed using timber-frame walls insulated with straw bales.

== Geography ==
According to Ian West of Southampton University, "Hengistbury Head is the best part of the Bournemouth coast for geology and geomorphology .... [and] is geologically important for the unusual nodules of sideritic ironstone [found] in Middle Eocene strata." The exposed and relatively untouched cliff face at the head perfectly lends itself to students of stratigraphy. Warren Hill itself is composed of Tertiary Bracklesham Beds, a mixture of clays and marls with overlying sandy and lignitic beds.

=== Erosion ===
One serious threat to the future of the Head is erosion of the exposed southern cliff face from wind and rain, as well as erosion caused by the sea primarily through the process of Longshore drift. A comparison of Ordnance Survey maps reveals that 25 metres of cliff was washed away between 1915 and 1962, a process accelerated by the Bournemouth cliff's concreted promenade and groynes, construction of which started in the early 20th century. It is thought that in the last 200 years around 150 metres of land has been lost from the head. The first attempt to counteract erosion came in the 1930s when Bournemouth Council constructed a breakwater now known as "the Long Groyne". Since then, a gabion revetment has been constructed to secure the weakest point at the eastern end of the Head. In a long-term project to secure the head's future, from 2005 to 2008 Poole Bay was replenished with 1.8 million cubic metres of beach material, drawing ire from some surfers and beach lovers owing to the increase in sharp stones on Southbourne beach in particular. The project's organizers, the Poole Bay Partnership, state that: "The resulting wide beaches have been a success in terms of their function as a coast protection structure and for the enjoyment they provide to the area's residents and visitors."

== Flora and fauna ==
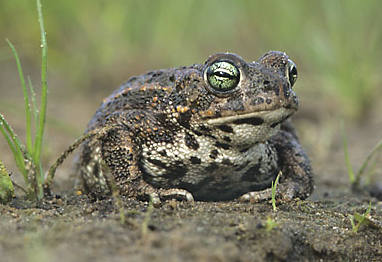
The natterjack toad (Bufo calamita), the UK's rarest amphibian

Hengistbury Head forms part of the Christchurch Harbour Site of Special Scientific Interest (SSSI), and in May 1990 was declared a Local Nature Reserve. The head supports 500 plant species (a quarter of the national flora), including eight red data book species, 14 nationally scarce, and 39 locally rare species. The main nature reserve area faces Christchurch Harbour, and is contiguous with the reed beds of Wick Fields. The Head contains a large variety of habitats from the heathland on Warren Hill to freshwater ponds, sand dunes, and salt marshes. The woodland (known as Withybed Wood) is home to English oak and silver birch amongst many other trees, and is of particular interest, as it is the only such area to be shown on an 1811 Ordnance Survey map of the Bournemouth/Christchurch area. In 2002, cattle-grazing commenced in a field near the new visitor centre known as Barn Field. This, combined with gorse eradication, has assisted in the restoration of this habitat to its ancient character.

Present on the site is sea knotgrass (Polygonum maritimum), the rarest of the knotgrasses in Britain, and currently listed as a "schedule 8 species" under the Wildlife and Countryside Act 1981. Such plants are afforded greater than usual protection against damaging activities – such as "cutting, picking, destroying or selling." The heathland is both a Special Area of Conservation and a Special Protection Area, part of a network of the best wildlife sites in Europe.

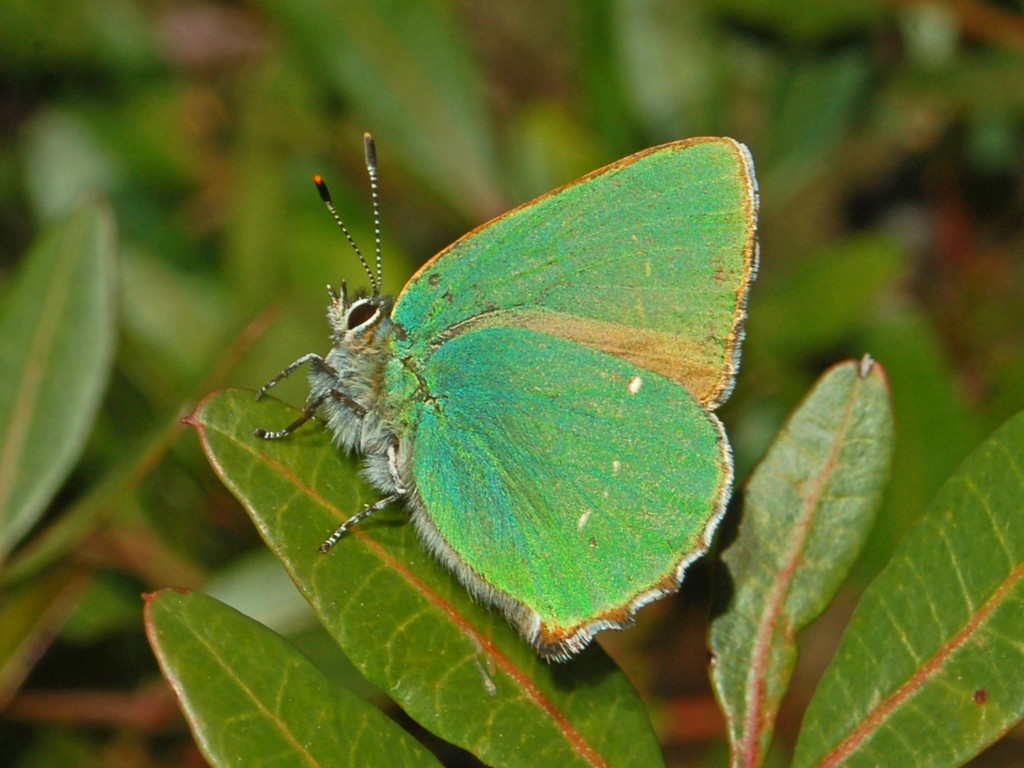
The green hairstreak, Callophrys rubi

The various habitats provide homes to numerous species of insects. There are 700 moth species recorded in the nature reserve, again a quarter of the national total. At different spots across the site butterflies (including the green hairstreak), damselflies (like the large red), and dragonflies (such as the hairy dragonfly) can be observed. According to a 2005 report, the exceedingly rare thirteen-spotted ladybird (Hippodamia 13-punctata) was recently observed at the head, the first sighting in the UK since 1952.

More than 300 bird species have been recorded in the area, making Hengistbury Head an important migratory point. The Balearic shearwater, considered critically endangered with extinction by the IUCN and seldom sighted in the UK, has been seen in the area. Other rare birds spotted here include the purple heron, the pink-footed goose, the European honey buzzard and the melodious warbler. The fields and reserved areas near the car park provide an ideal spot to watch and listen to a significant population of skylarks during the summer months.

In 1989 a project commenced to re-introduce the country's rarest amphibian, the natterjack toad, to Hengistbury Head. The natterjack was last recorded on the headland in the 1950s before its extinction, probably as the result of a lack of suitable ponds. The project has been a great success, and today there are thriving populations at various locations. The ideal time to witness their mating rituals is in May as dusk approaches, when the distinctive call of the natterjack can be heard for miles around.

== Politics ==
Hengistbury Head is part of the Bournemouth East parliamentary constituency. Hengistbury Head is also part of the East Southbourne and Tuckton ward which elects two councillors to Bournemouth, Christchurch and Poole Council.

== See also ==
- Warren Hill
- Mudeford Spit
- Withybed Wood
- Christchurch Harbour
- Southbourne, Dorset
- Hengest
