= Poole Bay =

Bay in Poole, United Kingdom

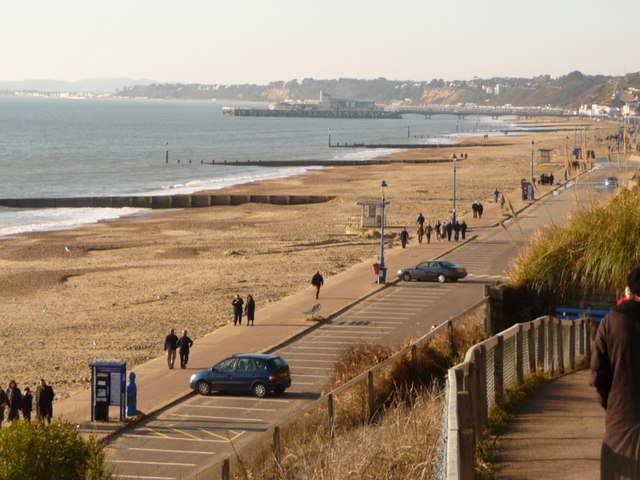

- Location within Dorset
- Coordinates: 50°40′N 1°52′W
- Ocean/sea sources: English Chanel, Atlantic Ocean
- Max. length: 16 km (9.9 mi)
- Settlements: Poole, Bournemouth

Poole Bay is a bay in the English Channel, on the coast of Dorset in southern England, which stretches 16 km from Sandbanks at the mouth of Poole Harbour in the west, to Hengistbury Head in the east. Poole Bay is a relatively shallow embayment and consists of steep sandstone cliffs and several 'chines' that allow easy access to the sandy beaches below. The coast along the bay is continuously built up, and is part of the South East Dorset conurbation, including parts of the towns of Poole, Bournemouth and Christchurch.

In terms of sand on England's south coast the bay presents the longest stretch; much exceeded by the total to the west across numerous bays and coves but greater than the three such stretches to the east, Avon Beach, West Wittering and Camber Sands.

== History ==
Measures to prevent coastal erosion have been deployed throughout the 20th century. Concrete seawalls and groynes allowed the construction of homes and roads on the clifftops, but prevented natural supply of sand and gravel to the shore. From 1970 to 2000 over 1.5 million m³ of sand was used to replenish the beaches at Bournemouth and Poole. Many of the beaches along Poole Bay were replenished during the winters of 2005 and 2006 with 1.1 million m³ of sand dredged from Poole Harbour and 700,000 m³ of sand dredged from a Licensed Area off the Isle of Wight. In 2015 a 17-year £43.7million project was approved to protect the beaches from further erosion over the next century. The plans involve replacing the groynes and adding new ones and replenishing the beaches with 210,000 cubic metres of sand and gravel every three years.

== Archaeology ==
In July 2022, marine archaeologists from Bournemouth University unearthed the relics of a 750 years old medieval shipwreck and its cargo off the coast of Dorset. Definite date of the ship was determined by tree ring dating method. Due to the combination of low-oxygenated water, sand and stone, one of the whole sides of the ship was well preserved and the hull was prominently visible, according to archaeologist Tom Cousins. Known as the Clinker ship in its design, the ship was carrying a load of Purbeck stones. Much of the cargo included many Purbeck stone mortars, large stones used by mills to grind grain into flour.

== Geology ==
The area of Poole Bay was predominantly created during the Pleistocene period, when the Solent river ran across the whole of South East Dorset and West Hampshire, out past the Isle of Wight The solid geology of the cliffs, and the seabed beneath Poole Bay, is composed of rocks of the Tertiary Bracklesham Group, consisting of a sequence of fine, medium and coarse sands. At Hengistbury Head there are younger rocks of the Bartonian group, forming an outlier. The Barton Clay here is made up of a series of sands and interbedded clays, with four distinct bands of ironstone nodules. These formations dip eastwards and are cut out by a north-west to south-east trending fault. This defines the eastwards boundary of Christchurch Ledge, which is a seawards continuation of the resistant ironstone strata exposed in Hengistbury Head.
