= Christchurch Harbour =

Natural harbour in Dorset, England

Coordinates: 50.72285°N 1.75404°W

- Site of Special Scientific Interest
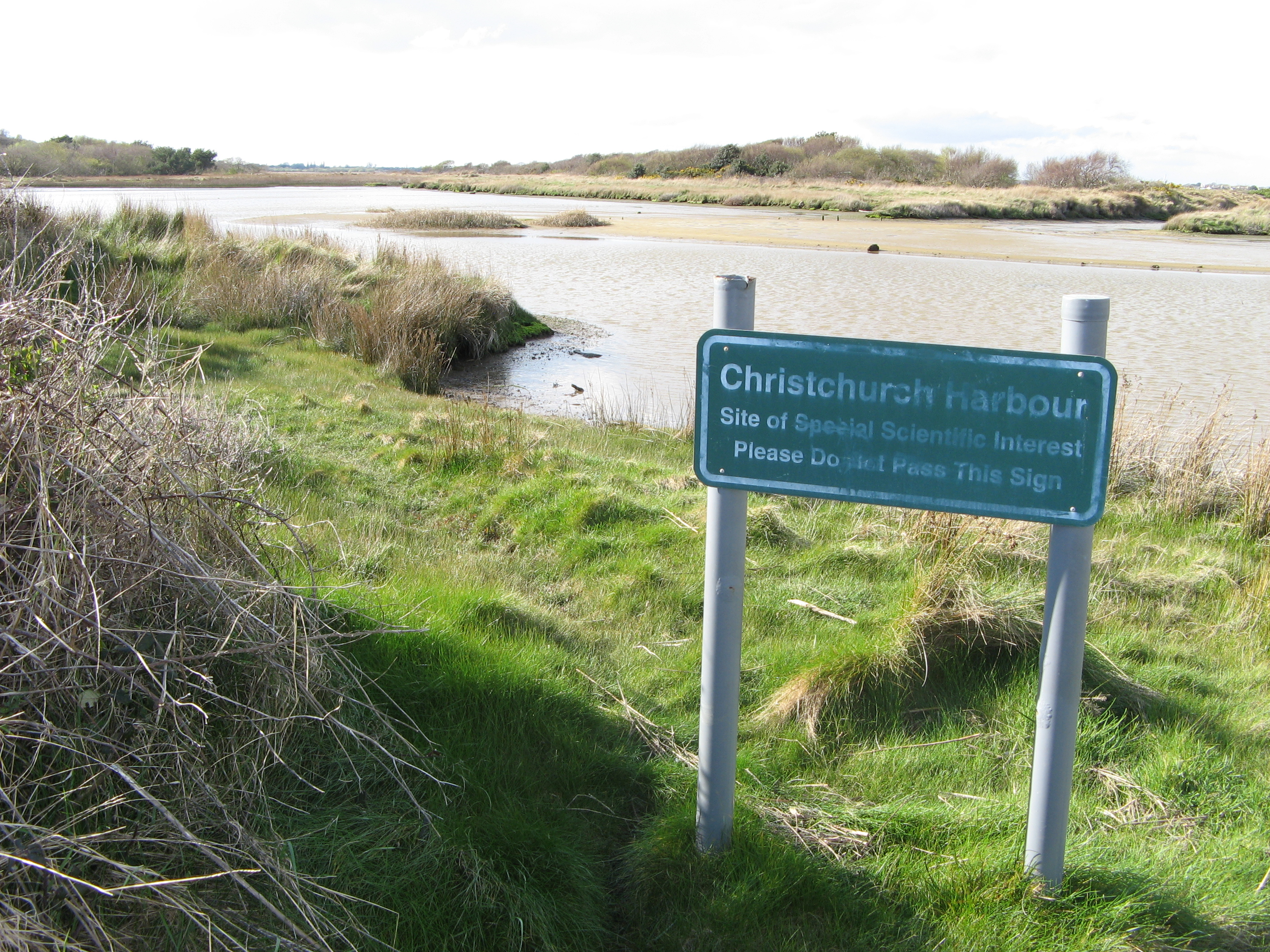
- Location of Christchurch Harbour.
- Area of search: Dorset
- Grid reference: SZ171914
- Interest: Biological; Geological
- Area: 352.1 ha (870 acres)
- Notification date: 1986
- Location map: Magic Map

Christchurch Harbour
- Location within Dorset
- OS grid reference: SZ174914
- Unitary authority: Bournemouth, Christchurch and Poole
- Ceremonial county: Dorset
- Region: South West
- Country: England
- Sovereign state: United Kingdom
- Post town: CHRISTCHURCH
- Postcode district: BH23
- Police: Dorset
- Fire: Dorset and Wiltshire
- Ambulance: South Western
- UK Parliament: Christchurch

Christchurch Harbour is a natural harbour in the county of Dorset, on the south coast of England named after the nearby town of Christchurch. Two rivers, the Avon and the Stour, flow into the harbour at its northwest corner. The harbour is generally shallow and due to the tidal harmonics in the English Channel has a double high water on each tide. On the north side of the harbour, east of the Avon are Priory Marsh, and to the east of this Stanpit Marsh, a Local Nature Reserve. To the west side of the harbour are Wick Fields, the southern flank of the harbour being bounded by Hengistbury Head, a prominent coastal headland. The harbour flows into the Christchurch Bay and the English Channel through a narrow channel known locally as The Run which rests between Mudeford Quay and Mudeford Spit. Shallow-draught boats can enter from this channel and cruise up stream for 2 miles (3 km) choosing either the Avon or the Stour, the Stour leading up as far as Iford Bridge passing Christchurch Quay and Tuckton.

Christchurch Harbour Site of Special Scientific Interest (SSSI) is a 352-hectare (870-acre) site designated both for its biological and geological interest. It comprises the estuary of the Stour and Avon and the Hengistbury Head peninsula. The varied habitats include saltmarsh, wet meadows, grassland, heath, sand dune, woodland and scrub. The site is of great ornithological interest.

== History ==
The harbour was formed around 7000 years ago when the sea level rose at the end of the last ice age. Previously the area which was many miles from the open sea was inhabited by Stone Age hunters. Archaeological finds dating from 12,500 year BP have been made on Hengistbury Head and Flints dating as much as 250,000 years BP have been found in the Bournemouth area. The Bluestones used at Stonehenge may have been transported via the harbour and the River Avon (2550 BCE). It is suggested that there may have been an ancient causeway usable at low water running from Double Dykes on the south shore to Tuttons Well located on the north shore near Stanpit village.

The harbour became a major trading port around 100BCE, exports included copper, gold, silver and iron and importing luxury goods including wine and glass from which jewellery was manufactured. It is likely that slaves were also exported through the harbour. The boats used at this time were shallow draft, oak-planked with square leather sails for propulsion. It would have been a twelve-hour passage across the channel to Cherbourg and without any modern compasses or much weather forecasting. Despite this there was considerable two way trade with both British and Foreign Ports, it then declined as a result of the Roman invasion of France in 56 BCE. The remains of a Roman ship were discovered in the harbour in 1910. Trade continued until the Roman Invasion of Britain in AD43. During Saxon times the harbour again became one of the most important in Britain as it was easily reached from the continent and boats could enter the harbour and travel up the river Avon all the way to Salisbury, and along the Stour to Wimborne and Blandford Forum.

In 1664 The River Avon Navigation act was passed to again enable vessels to travel as far as Salisbury and reestablish it as a port as in medieval times. Traffic used the river from 1684 to 1720 with a break whilst repairs were made from 1695 to 1700. The route was finally abandoned in 1730. In 1695 Lord Clarendon made a new entrance in Mudeford Sandbank using the iron stone from Hengistbury to form a training bank, these rocks now called Clarendon Rocks are still in existence, but the new entrance silted up and the channel returned to its original course. During this period and up until the middle of the 19th century, smuggling was rife in the Harbour (see the Battle of Mudeford).

There were numerous Harbour Improvement schemes proposed in the next three centuries, particularly the Railway and Docks Scheme of 1885. This would have seen major dredging of the harbour, training banks within the harbour and a railway terminus on the south side. In 1965 there were a plans to construct a marina at Wick Hams. This and the other schemes were never proceeded with. In the 1930s there were three "tea boats" providing refreshments to holidaymakers and at least another five houseboats in the harbour these were all abandoned and then wrecked during World War II. The river was dredged in 1937 and again in the 1950s using a Suction Dredger, in the late 1980s Wessex Water carried out substantial dredging in the River Stour from Iford bridge as far as Christchurch Quay, this was part of a Flood Alleviation Plan. The channel has been marked since at least 1884 first by Christchurch Sailing Club and since 1963 by the Harbour Improvements Association now renamed Christchurch Harbour Association. Since 1963 the Mudeford inshore lifeboat has been stationed on the quay at Mudeford.

== Geology ==
The harbour is made up of Sandy Gravels, Sands, Muddy Sands, and towards the margins Silty Muds. High and low Salt marsh both exist within the harbour, the latter colonised by Puccinellia and other grasses. Spartina anglica does not exist in significant volume, with no sign that it was previously extensive. The sedimentation of the harbour has not therefore been substantially affected in the way most other south coast estuaries have by the spread and die back of this species. Any loss of the salt marsh appears to have been offset by the re-colonization of abandoned artificial salt pans. Extensive Phragmites reed beds occupy tidal creek margins and areas of higher marsh, where they front wet grazing meadows. The inflow and outflow of sediment in the harbour is positive,. Grimbury Marsh, is substantially composed of dredged spoil material. In total the estuarine system is a sediment sink.

== Royalty Fishery ==
The earliest reference to the Royal Fishery at Christchurch dates back to 939AD and there was a valuable fishery in medieval times when the fishery was the property of the Lord of the Manor. The Royalty Fishery Title was conferred by Royal Grant during Queen Mary's reign and was renewed by Elizabeth I. It had come into the possession of the crown by reason of treason. The Queen sold the rights back to Lord Huntington and it was sold on to the Lord of the Manor of Christchurch in 1791. The fishery was then sold to a Mr Thyrwit Walker in 1865, and it was purchased by West Hampshire Water Company in 1929. The Crown had retained the title and fishing rights to the bottom third presumably as an anti-smuggling measure. Today the fishery is claimed to be best Sea trout fishing in England, with some Salmon as well as Mullet and Bass. Also Coarse fish, Roach, Dace, Carp and Pike, the harbour and rivers have now been made a sport fishery where all species are returned to ensure the long term sustainability of the fishery. Montague Hayter was its head keeper between 1909 and 1946.

== Wildlife ==
The harbour is home to a great variety of wildlife. Over 320 bird species have been recorded by Christchurch Harbour Ornithological Group. The harbour and marshes are an important staging point for migratory birds. There is also an abundance of insect life, and many rare plant species. Stanpit and the other marshes are used for grazing horses and cattle. Both Otters and Seals have been seen in the harbour.

== Leisure ==
The harbour is home to three Sailing Clubs, Highcliffe Sailing Club situated on Mudeford Quay, Mudeford Sailing Club on the North Shore and Christchurch Sailing Club adjacent to Place Mill on Christchurch Quay. Christchurch Rowing Club is situated on the Quomps above Christchurch Quay. Hengistbury Head Activities Centre is situated on the South Shore of the Harbour. There are more than 1,400 small boat moorings in the harbour and rivers. Sailing, rowing, canoeing, windsurfing and kite surfing are all practised in the harbour. Fishing Walking and Bird Spotting are all activities enjoyed on the harbour shores. Ferries run from Tuckton Bridge to Mudeford Sandbank and between there and Mudeford Quay, these are some of the same vessels first used in the 1930s. The Mudeford ferry crossing "The Run" was until the 1960s operated by Rowing boats with payment at the discretion of the passenger. There is also a ferry at Wick.

== Around the harbour ==
To describe the various features of the harbour, it is convenient to divide the harbour, and list the features from inland (west) to outlet (east end). Tuckton Bridge over the River Stour, although inland from the harbour, is a convenient starting point. This is also the boundary between Bournemouth and Christchurch.

=== North side ===
From Tuckton Bridge along the River Stour there are river front properties up to the Captains Club hotel which is located on the west end of a quay and open space known locally as The Quomps this is overlooked by Christchurch Priory at the eastern end. The River Avon joins the Stour alongside the Priory. Across the Avon are Priory and Grimbury Marsh then the larger Stanpit Marsh (see below), Blackberry point which is an island at High Water is to the east of the marsh. Further east are the residential areas of Stanpit and Mudeford. At the eastern end of the harbour is Mudeford Quay, and the harbour entrance which is a relatively narrow channel, named The Run, the coast eastward and open to the sea leads to Highcliffe, the next coastal village.

=== South side ===
From Tuckton Bridge, the two main sections of the harbour shore are Wick and Hengistbury Head, which are in Southbourne a suburb of Bournemouth. The harbour proper begins around Wick Fields, a reed marsh and part of the area of importance for nature conservation. The Hengistbury Head Activities Centre is situated on the shore just before Barn Bight. Hengistbury Head on the south shore was threatened during the nineteenth century by the mining of ironstone doggers which dramatically increased erosion. The silt washed into that part of the harbour threatened the ecology and to prevent this, the Quarry Pool was created on the headland by building a dam in 1976. Holloway's Dock cuts into the land before the shore reaches Mudeford Sandbank which juts northwards towards The Run. The sandbank is the home to many Beach huts, a cafe and the terminus for the Hengistbury Head Land Train.

== Stanpit Marsh ==
Along part of the south west side of the Stanpit road is Stanpit Marsh. It was formed as the result of action and deposition of material from the rivers Stour and Avon as they meet with the salt water within Christchurch Harbour. Together with Grimbury Marsh, it forms one of the largest areas of salt marsh in the county. It is a Site of Special Scientific Interest (SSSI) and an important nature reserve of about 65 hectares (160 acres), combining both freshwater and saltwater habitats. It is an important staging point for migratory birds. A circular path on the marsh uses a prototype Bailey bridge to cross Mother Siller's Channel. The highest point of the marsh is Crouch Hill at 15' above sea level.
