= Mudeford =

Area of Christchurch, Dorset, England

Coordinates: 50.728°N 1.743°W

- Location within Dorset
- Population: 4,977 (2011, Mudeford and Friars Cliffe Ward)
- OS grid reference: SZ178914
- Unitary authority: Bournemouth, Christchurch and Poole
- Ceremonial county: Dorset
- Region: South West
- Country: England
- Sovereign state: United Kingdom
- Post town: CHRISTCHURCH
- Postcode district: BH23
- Dialling code: 01202 or 01425
- Police: Dorset
- Fire: Dorset and Wiltshire
- Ambulance: South Western
- UK Parliament: Christchurch

Mudeford (/ˈmʌdɪfərd/ MUD-ih-fərd) is a harbourside and beachside parish based on a former fishing village in the east of Christchurch, Dorset, England (historically in Hampshire), fronting water on two sides: Christchurch Harbour and the sands of Avon Beach.

The River Mude and Bure Brook enter the harbour under the main promenade. In the late 20th century small buffer zones to the north-east, north and north-west were infilled with low-rise housing, and in the 2011 census the Christchurch contiguous urban area, excluding Bournemouth, touching to the west, extending along the coast to take in Barton-on-Sea had 54,210 residents. Mudeford is one of its main tourist and leisure urban centres. The ward had a population density of 24 persons per hectare in 2011.

Mudeford includes two woodland areas, Mudeford Woods and Peregrine Woods, a recreation ground on the north side of Stanpit (used to play cricket, probably as far back as the 1860s) and All Saints' Church (built in 1869 as a gift by Mortimer Ricardo, who lived at Bure Homage House).

== Amenities ==
=== Schools ===
The village has eponymous Infants and Junior Schools.

=== Mudeford Quay ===
The present-day Mudeford Quay was constructed in the late 1940s. Before this, the Haven (as it was then known) was surrounded by sloping beaches. The Run was much wider than it is now and the area was subject to such erosion that Christchurch Council bought the whole area in 1945. Five years later it had been raised and reinforced with steel piles and concrete. Today the Quay, consisting of the Haven Inn public house, a number of former fishermen's cottages and a large car park, is still used by local fishing boats and is a base for water sports. A Royal National Lifeboat Institution (RNLI) inshore lifeboat station is on the Quay.

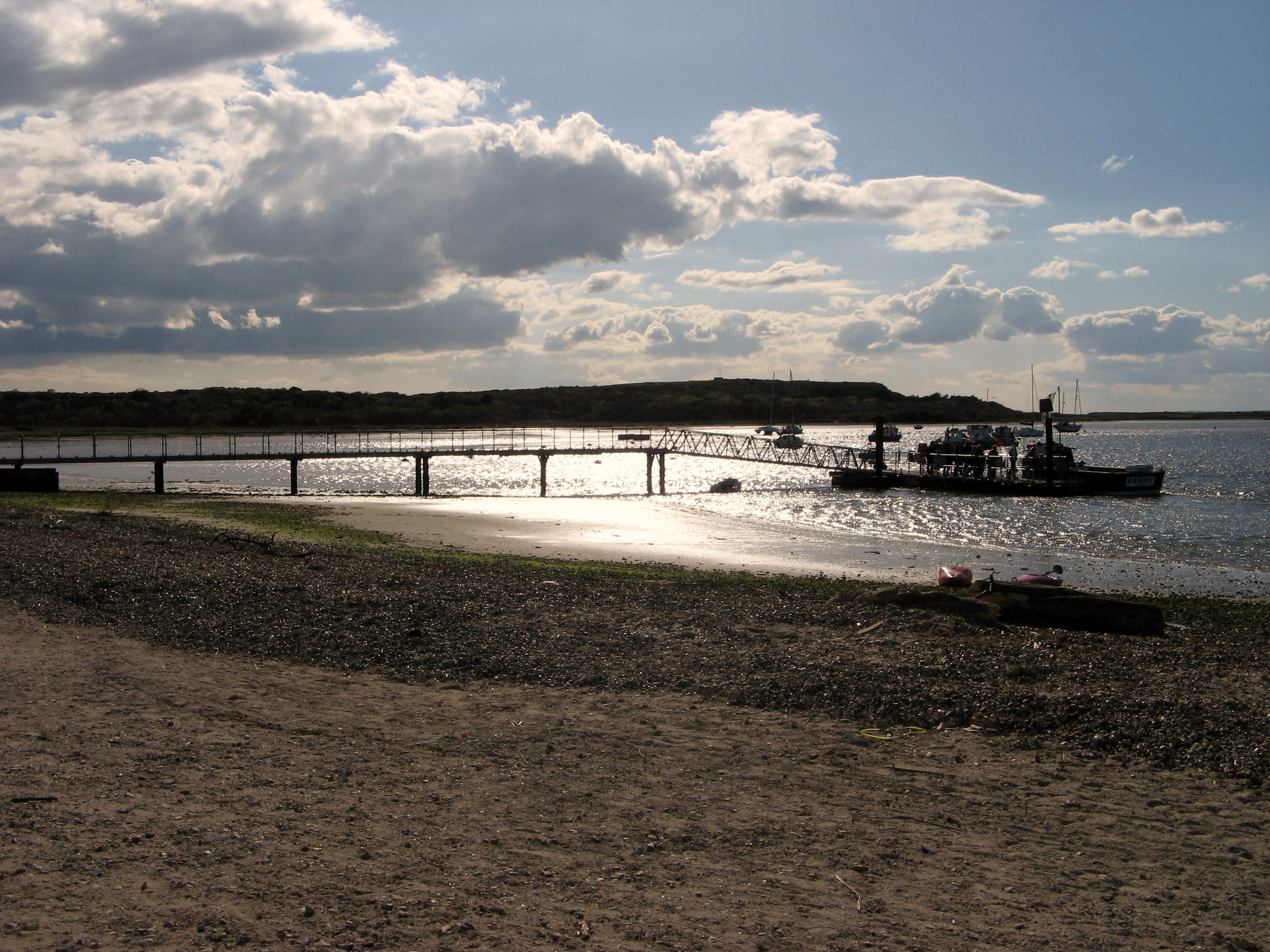
Mudeford Ferry April 2008

The Mudeford ferry operates between the Quay and Mudeford Sandbank on Hengistbury Head. The ferry was operated by rowing boats until the 1960s with payment being at the discretion of the passenger. Mudeford Quay is at the entrance to the Harbour known as "The Run". George III is recorded as having visited Mudeford in 1801 and used a bathing machine.

=== Avon Beach ===
About 3/4 mile (1.2 km) of sand, in the east all below gradually rising gentle cliffs, has much accessibility by paths and car parks and several small businesses, including art and souvenir shops, ice cream shops and restaurants, with views over The Needles and the west of the Isle of Wight on the near horizon. The soft beach type is one of three short stretches of sand east of Bournemouth Bay (sic) on England's south coast, the others being West Wittering in West Sussex and Camber Sands in East Sussex. It is possible to walk 9 miles (14 km) along the beach; after the sandy east-facing stretch it turns increasingly to mixtures of shingle and pebbles for the remainder, as far as beyond the cusp of Hurst Castle.

=== Church ===
The village church is All Saints Church. Originally a Chapel of Ease it was built from 1869-71 to a design by John Loughborough Pearson. It had three stained glass windows added in 1918, 1931 and 1961. The Church suffered a fire in July 2022 that largely destroyed the building. The congregation aims to have rebuilt the Church by 2026.

== Haven House ==
The oldest of the buildings on Mudeford Quay are now known as Dutch Cottages. They were formerly (collectively) called Haven House built, together with an adjoining quay, in about 1687 in connection with other harbour works under powers of the Salisbury Avon Navigation Act. They stand partially on ground formed by the artificial infilling of the old harbour mouth. As early as January 1699 one of these buildings was serving as an alehouse, and in 1757 it also provided accommodation for fifteen Hessian troops and their sergeant. This was the original Haven House Inn, run by Thomas Humby for at least eighteen years following the death of its landlady, Hannah Sillar, in 1802. Humby also ran the King’s Arms in Christchurch for about the same period of time. The present Haven House Inn public house nearby is thought to have been built around 1830, and certainly before 1832 when a Mr Dixon became its landlord and it appeared in a topographical etching.

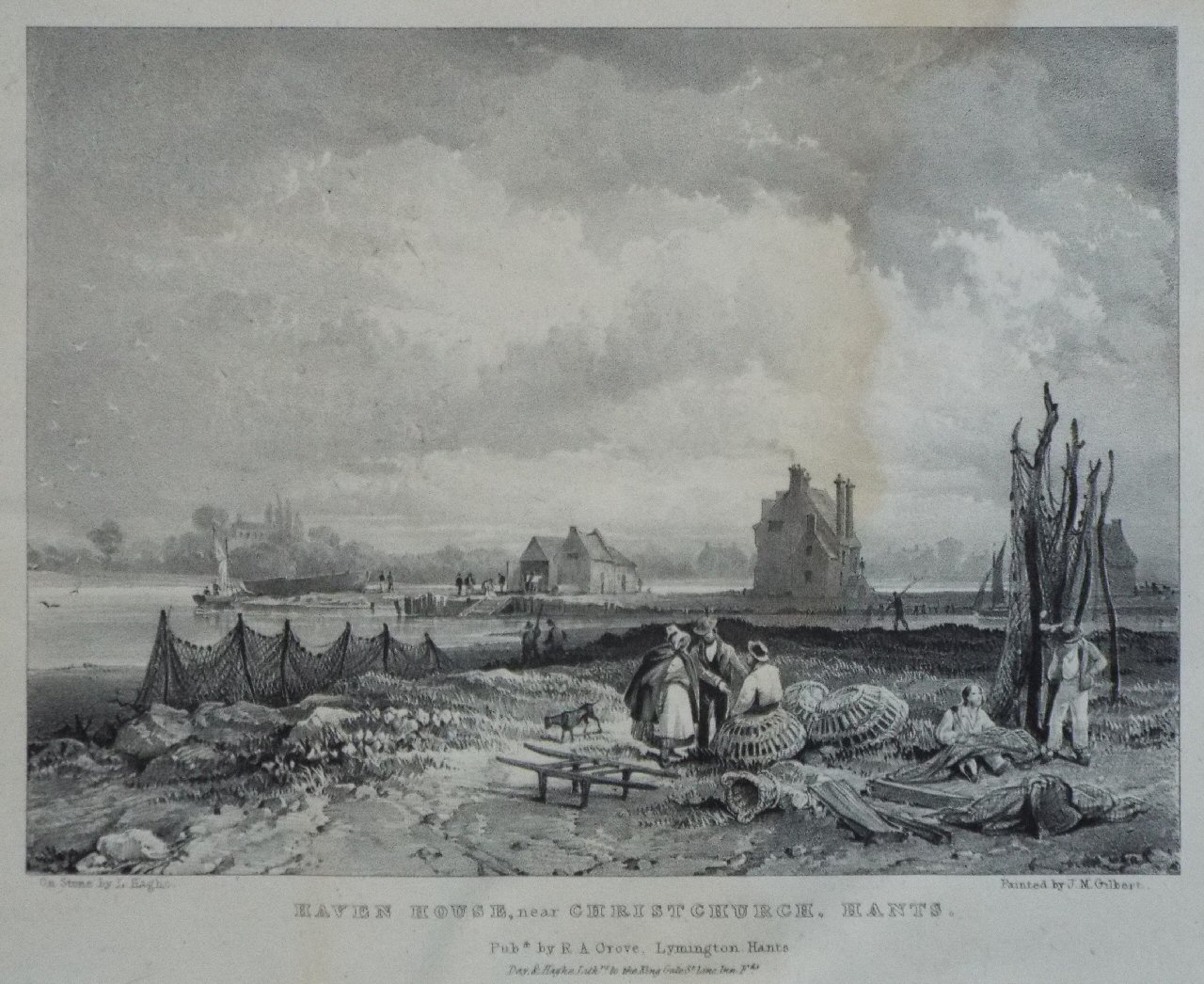
Mudeford Quay, 1832

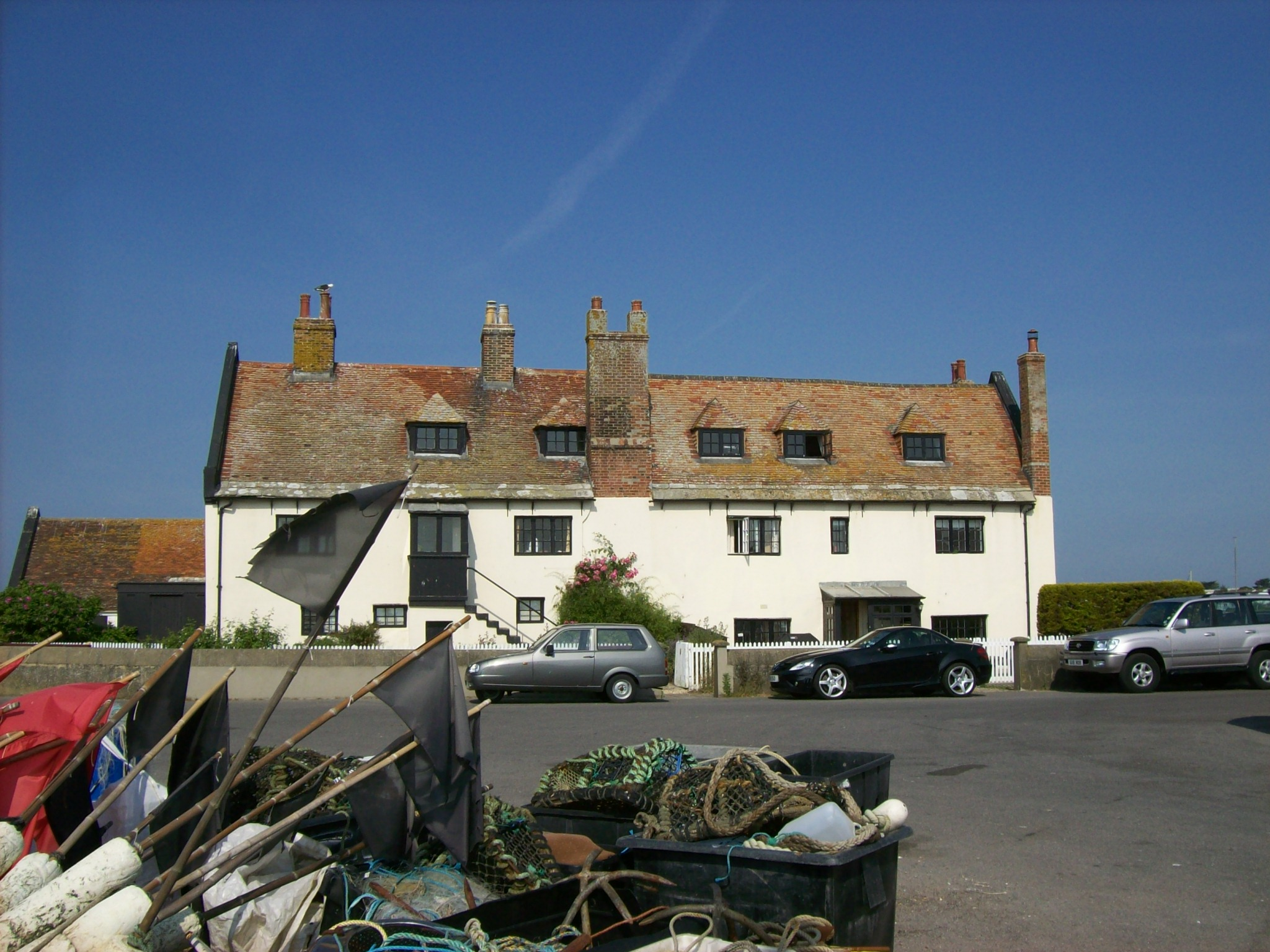
The Dutch Cottages, formerly the Haven House, on Mudeford Quay

The district was notorious for smuggling as early as 1680, and a preventive officer of the Revenue Service was already stationed 'att the haven of Christchurch’ in 1719, in addition to the officer stationed in the town. Orders were issued in 1725 for two officers to be stationed 'at the Havens Mouth' and provided with a boat. There being no other buildings there, it is likely that these officers occupied some of the Haven House buildings from this time. Certainly, sometime after the foundation of the Coastguard service in 1822 the whole of the Haven House was leased by the Government from the manor of Somerford to house a Chief Officer, Boatmen, and their families. In 1784 the Inn played a central role in the Battle of Mudeford, a violent conflict between a gang of smugglers and naval Revenue officers. This period saw the growth of Mudeford as a fashionable seaside resort for the well-to-do and Humby refurbished and enlarged the Haven House as a sea-bathing lodging-house.

In 1861 the Admiralty ordered the construction of a new purpose-built Coastguard Station, which was erected on the north side of Christchurch Harbour at Stanpit. By this time Mudeford's popularity as a resort had waned and the Haven House subsequently became fishermen’s cottages and has remained as private dwellings. The building is now Grade II listed.

== Sandhills ==
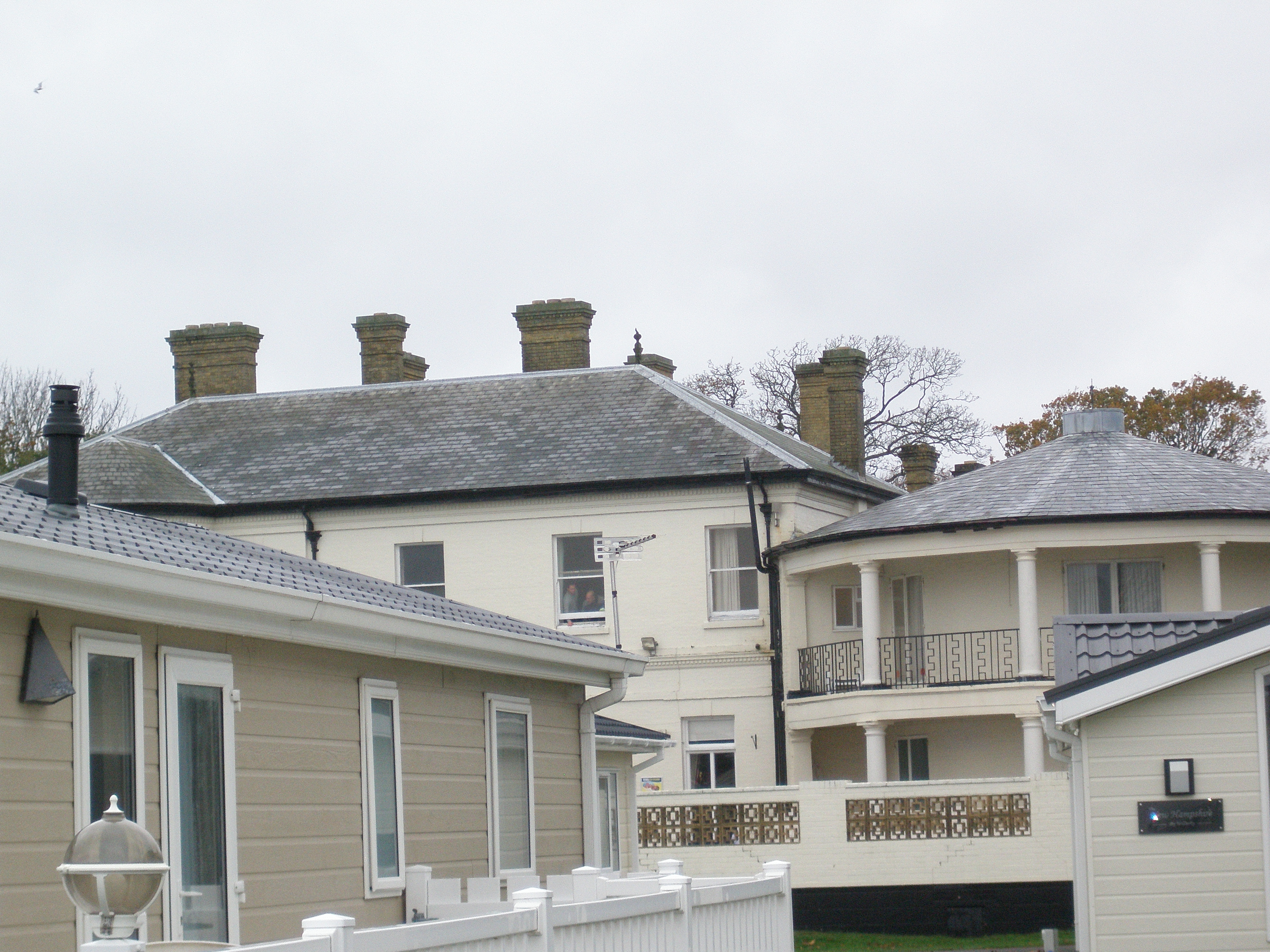
Sandhills

Sandhills was the holiday home of the Right Hon George Rose, Member of Parliament and close friend and advisor to the prime minister William Pitt, who had it built on the beach at Mudeford c.1785. Rose's friend, King George III stayed there on a number of occasions, helping to promote Christchurch as a tourist destination. Sandhills was also home to George Rose's two sons: Sir George Henry Rose, politician and diplomat, and William Stewart Rose, poet. Field Marshal Hugh Rose, 1st Baron Strathnairn, son of George Henry Rose, also spent time living at the family home. Sandhills is now a holiday park owned by Park Holidays UK with static caravans in the grounds but the house still remains although it has been converted to flats. In the 1940s and 1950s Sandhills was used as a school annexed to Somerford Infants School and Mudeford School.

== Gundimore ==
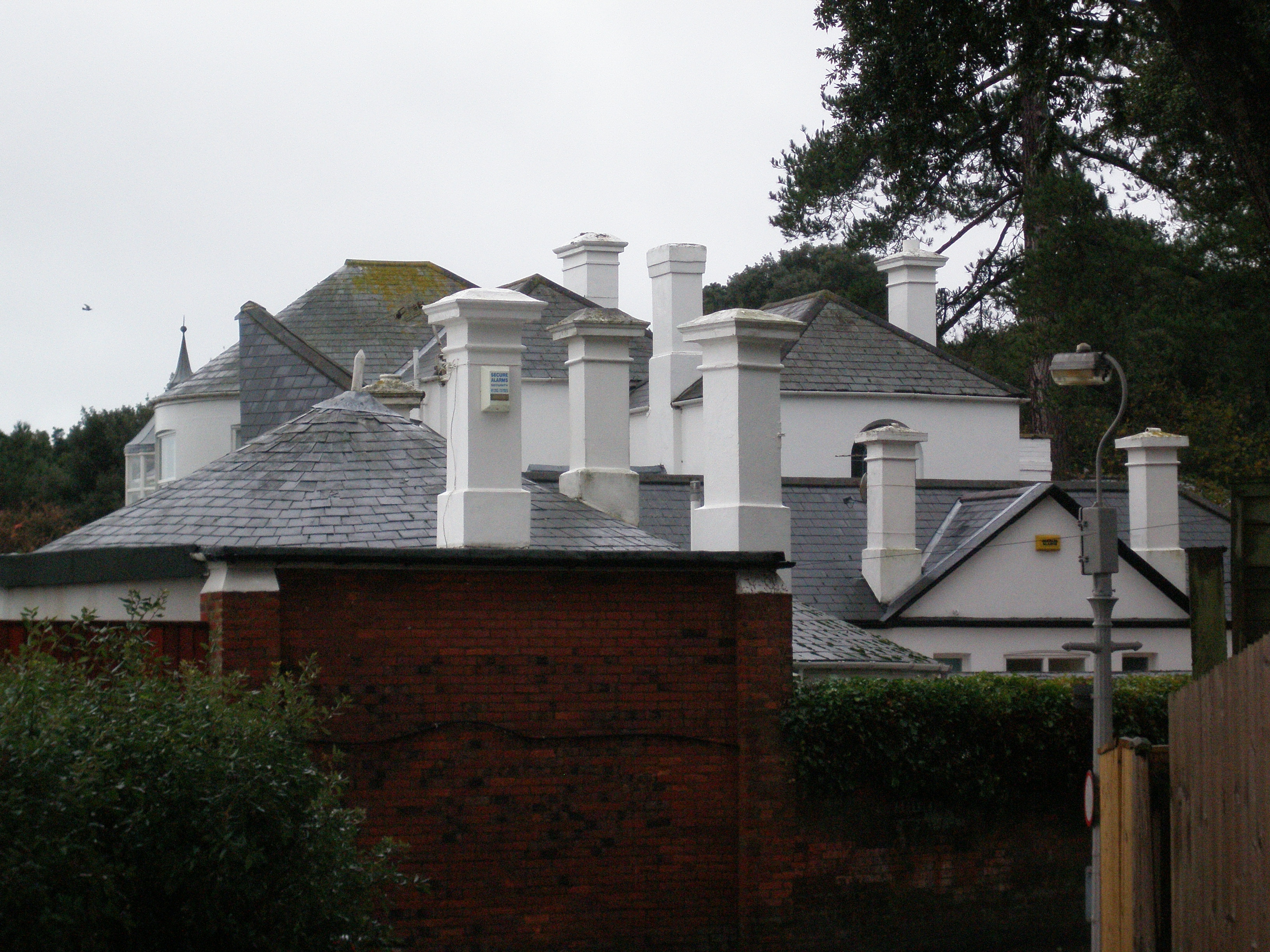
Gundimore

Gundimore is an exotically inspired, listed house near Avon Beach built in 1796 for the poet William Stewart Rose, the second son of George Rose of Sandhills. The origin of the name is unknown, though in the notes to his poem Gundimore, published in Rhymes (1837), Rose says that he was only answerable for the adoption of the "unmeaning name" of a wooden summerhouse that had been erected on the site by a previous occupant. Nevertheless, in a 17th century poem On the Spanish Match, the Count of Gondomar, a Spanish ambassador to England during the reign of King James I, is called Gundimore.

Visitors to Gundimore included fellow poets Coleridge, Southey and Sir Walter Scott while writing his epic poem Marmion. It is said to have been built to resemble a Turkish tent with gilt Arabic inscriptions to remind the original owner of his travels in the east. It consisted of a centre section and two wings. The centre has five windows with a great, curved projection (bay) with a shallow, conical roof; its south west corner has a two-storey turret, shaped like a squat house with the upper storey mostly glazed to provide a view (belvedere). The north eastern wing is now Scott's Cottage.

== The Anchorage ==
Originally named Elmhurst, this house was built c.1870 by the politician Viscount Bury, only son of the 6th Earl of Albemarle. In the late 1860s Viscount Bury had bought Elm Tree Cottage, which stood on the northern edge of the Sandhills estate, with the intention of erecting a seaside holiday home on the site. The new building was designed by Colonel Sir Robert William Edis, an architect favoured by the Prince of Wales (later King Edward VII) and known for designing many large hotels and clubs in London. He also designed the nearby Boscombe Spa Hotel. In 1868, Viscount Bury was on the beach near his new home when he observed a fishing boat in difficulties. With the assistance of a Coastguardsman, he rowed out to the stricken boat and was able to save one of the three fishermen.

In 1889 Elmhurst was bought at auction by George Hamilton Fletcher (1860–1930), who renamed it The Anchorage. He was an ardent yachtsman who became a member of the Royal Yacht Squadron, Cowes with his boat Joyeuse. By his marriage to Ada Herapath, Fletcher was a brother-in-law to the artist and long-term illustrator for Punch magazine Linley Sambourne, whose diaries record that he stayed at The Anchorage on several occasions. Fletcher sold The Anchorage in 1919.

After two more private owners, the building was acquired in 1929 by the Teachers Provident Society for use as a retirement and convalescent home for teachers. This was officially opened on 19 April 1930 by the Minister of Health, the Right Hon Arthur Greenwood. At the start of World War II it provided offices for the Society's staff who were transferred from London. Later in the war it was requisitioned by the Government for use as a military billet. After the war it returned it its former use as a convalescent home. It is still owned by the Teachers' Housing Association. The building is Grade II Listed. DoE Ref 3/234 Grid Reference: SZ1863592089.

== Bure Homage House ==
On the outskirts of the original Mudeford village, close to the course of Bure Brook, was an imposing mansion called Bure Homage House with a large associated estate which included Friars Cliff. It was built at the start of the 19th century, replacing Bure Farmhouse, by Charles Stuart, 1st Baron Stuart de Rothesay. In 1837, it was sold to Sophie Dawes, a renowned smuggler who became a French Baroness. During World War II, it was used as an officers mess by the 405th Fighter Group who operated at RAF Christchurch. After the war it was used for a while by the Signals Research and Development Establishment. It was demolished in 1957. It was situated in the area which is now called Bure Homage Gardens, and accessed via the lodge which is still to be seen opposite the site of the former Waterford Hotel. It was associated with the nearby Highcliffe Castle which was built later between 1831 and 1835. The land is now occupied by residential housing.

== Other historic buildings still in existence ==
- Mudeford House (later Avonmouth Hotel and Christchurch Harbour Hotel) Grade II Listed. DoE Ref 3/39 Grid Reference: SZ1807892118
- Waterford Lodge (later Waterford Lodge Hotel)
- Sandford Hotel (later The Moorings). The hotel doubled up as the Mudeford post office in Victorian times. Sandford Hotel opened in 1835. Grade II* Listed. DoE Reference: 3/40. Grid Reference: SZ1828692064.
- An early Victorian pillar box is still in use close to The Moorings. It dates back to 1856. Grade II Listed. DoE Ref 3/226 Grid Reference: SZ1830892068.
- The Nelson Tavern

== Lifeboats ==
The first Christchurch lifeboat was in service by early 1804. It was Number 17 of the 31 'Original' lifeboats designed and built by Henry Greathead of South Shields, making Mudeford one of the earliest places on the coast of Great Britain to operate a purpose-built rescue boat. The boat was presented by the Right Hon George Rose, the Member of Parliament for Christchurch, who owned the nearby Sandhills villa. In 1802 Greathead wrote that George Rose had enquired about the provision of a lifeboat for Christchurch. Later that year Rose sat on a House of Commons Select Committee that granted Greathead a remuneration payment of £1,200 for his selfless life-saving work. Part of the payment for the Christchurch boat was met from a fund established by Lloyd’s marine insurers to assist coastal communities to buy a lifeboat, though the bulk of the cost and subsequent running expenses still had to be raised locally. The boat’s crew of ten oarsmen and a steersman was provided by local volunteers, and a signal gun was to be provided at the Haven House to help direct it towards a wreck. It is not known how long this boat was in service and there are no known records of any rescues.

In 1868 a lifeboat was presented to the inhabitants of Mudeford by Donald Nicoll, Member of Parliament for Frome, as a token of regard for his friend Viscount Bury, who resided at Elmhurst (now The Anchorage). The provision of the boat was organised by the Royal Humane Society. It is believed that the 16 foot boat had been built at Cowes, Isle of Wight, by the noted shipbuilding firm of John Samuel White and was of an innovative design that had been patented by White and Southampton-based engineer and inventor Andrew Lamb. The lifeboat was conveyed to Christchurch by railway and its onward journey to Mudeford was organised by local hotelier Nicholas Newlyn, all free of charge. It was proposed that the lifeboat be named Lord Bury because Viscount Bury and Coastguard Boatman Charles Pride had recently risked their own lives in the unsuitable Coastguard boat in a bid to rescue three Mudeford fishermen. Although they had been able to save only one of the men, Viscount Bury and Pride received a letter of commendation from Queen Victoria through Thomas Biddulph, and the RNLI and Royal Humane Society subsequently awarded them both with a silver medal for their gallantry.

The first modern RNLI lifeboat, an inflatable D class boat, was stationed on Mudeford Quay in 1963. The present Lifeboat Station was opened in 2003.

== Christchurch Airfield ==
Christchurch Airfield, which operated in World War II as RAF Christchurch, was bordered by Mudeford Lane, Stroud Lane and Bure Lane. By the 1960s it was mostly wilderness. At that time it was separated from an SRDE site on the north by a high wire fence. Since then the wilderness has been largely replaced with residential housing and a school.

== Notable residents ==
- The Right Hon George Rose (1744–1818), Member of Parliament and close friend and advisor to the prime minister William Pitt, built a seaside home, 'Sandhills', at Mudeford c.1785. His friend King George III stayed there on a number of occasions, helping to promote Christchurch as a tourist destination.
- Sandhills, Mudeford was also home to George Rose's two sons: Sir George Henry Rose (1771–1855), politician and diplomat, and William Rose (1775–1843), poet.
- Field Marshal Hugh Rose, 1st Baron Strathnairn, (1801–1885) son of George Henry Rose also spent time living at the family home.
- Cricketer Leo Harrison was born (1922) and died (2016) in Mudeford.
- Novelist Miles Gibson (born 1947) grew up in Mudeford.

== Stanpit ==
Stanpit village is a historic area along the southern boundary of current day Mudeford. The Stanpit road connects from the end of the original Mudeford road through to Purewell Cross. Along part of the south west side of Stanpit road is Stanpit Marsh.

The village is mentioned in the Domesday Book (1086) as 'Stanpeta' meaning 2 estates with meadows.

== Somerford ==
Somerford is a historical district of Christchurch that borders with Mudeford and is intersected by the Somerford Road (B3059). Somerford was named after a ford over the River Mude which was only passable in summertime – its approximate site is that of the current day Somerford Roundabout.

== Mudeford Spit ==
Historically part of Christchurch, Mudeford Spit was sold to Bournemouth Borough Council in 1935. It is the larger of the two features, the other being the Haven, that almost enclose Christchurch Harbour, leaving its water to rise and fall through a narrow channel known as The Run. Formed by sand and shingle brought around Hengistbury Head by longshore drift and pushed towards the shore by waves from the east, the spit is the most mobile of Dorset's geographical features. Prior to the construction of the long groyne at Hengistbury Head in 1938, it tended to grow steadily in a north-easterly direction and on occasion stretched as far as Steamer Point and Highcliffe Castle; most notably in 1880. It has been breached a number of times naturally; 1883, 1911, 1924, 1935 and once deliberately in the 17th century when an attempt was made to construct another entrance to the harbour. After the last breaching in 1935, the end of the spit broke off and drifted towards the section of eastern beach known as Friars Cliff where it formed a lagoon. The groyne built in 1938 to protect Hengistbury Head from erosion had an adverse effect on the spit as it prevented movement of material around it. The spit began to erode due to wave action from the east and many attempts have been made since to stabilise the situation. Small seawalls were constructed on the spit in the 1960s and a large number of rubble groynes were put down during the 1980s.

Beach huts on Mudeford Spit can be reached on foot or land train (popularly known as the ‘Noddy’ train) from the main part of Bournemouth Bay, or by ferry from Mudeford Quay. On the spit is the "Black House", a local landmark – in various local smuggling legends, it was built in 1848 for the manager of the Hengistbury Head Mining Company, and therefore these tales are unlikely to be true.

== Politics ==
Mudeford is part of the Christchurch parliamentary constituency for elections to the House of Commons. It is currently represented by Conservative MP Christopher Chope.

Mudeford is also part of the Mudeford, Stanpit and West Highcliffe wards for elections to Bournemouth, Christchurch and Poole Council.
