= Wick, Bournemouth =

Coordinates: 50.728°N 1.780°W

Wick
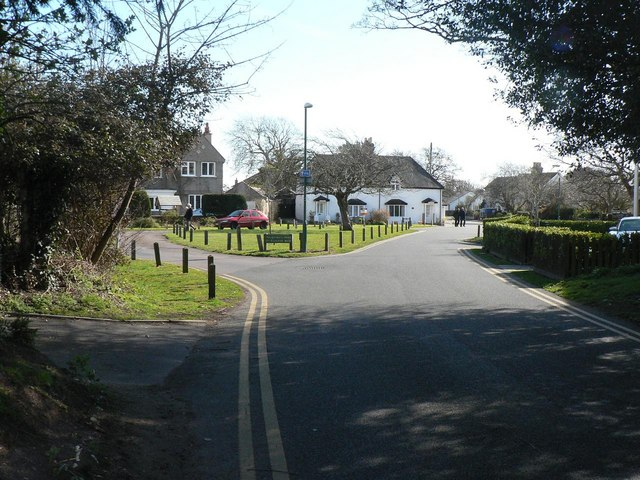
- Wick: the green

- Location within Dorset
- OS grid reference: SZ155921
- Unitary authority: Bournemouth, Christchurch and Poole
- Ceremonial county: Dorset
- Region: South West
- Country: England
- Sovereign state: United Kingdom
- Post town: BOURNEMOUTH
- Postcode district: BH6
- Dialling code: 01202
- Police: Dorset
- Fire: Dorset and Wiltshire
- Ambulance: South Western
- UK Parliament: Bournemouth East

Wick is a village on the south bank of the River Stour in Dorset, England, just short of the Stour's entry into Christchurch Harbour. Along with the nearby village of Tuckton, it originally formed a tithing in the Hundred of Christchurch, before becoming part of the Civil Parish of Southbourne in 1894. The latter was incorporated into the Borough of Bournemouth in 1901.

== Etymology and early settlement ==
The village name derives from the Old English wīc, meaning "dairy farm". The village is mentioned in the ministers' accounts for the Manor of Christchurch in 1301, at which point the king (as Lord of the manor) could claim the second-best sheep from every customary fold in Wick (there being at that time six folds), while the tenants in return were allowed pasture in the "demesne arable land" outside the ditch of Hengistbury.

There are two references to a "Manor of Wick" in the Christchurch Cartulary, a series of charters drawn up by the monks of Christchurch Priory. The first comes in 1331 in a survey of splotgabulum, a type of land tax payable to the clergy. From this, we learn that the Manor of Wick contained 276 acres of arable land, a messuage taxed at one shilling per year, and a dovecote which had grown dilapidated during the reign of Edward II, and had fallen down. The second reference comes in 1406 when we read that, on 13 October that year, a large fish ("uni magno piscis"), 18 ft. long, had been washed up at "La Bournemowthe" and taken to the Manor of Wick, where it was cut into forty pieces. Four days later, Canon John Leye ventured across from the Priory and was handed four portions of the fish as tithe. This, incidentally, is the earliest known reference to Bournemouth as a toponym.

== Listed buildings ==
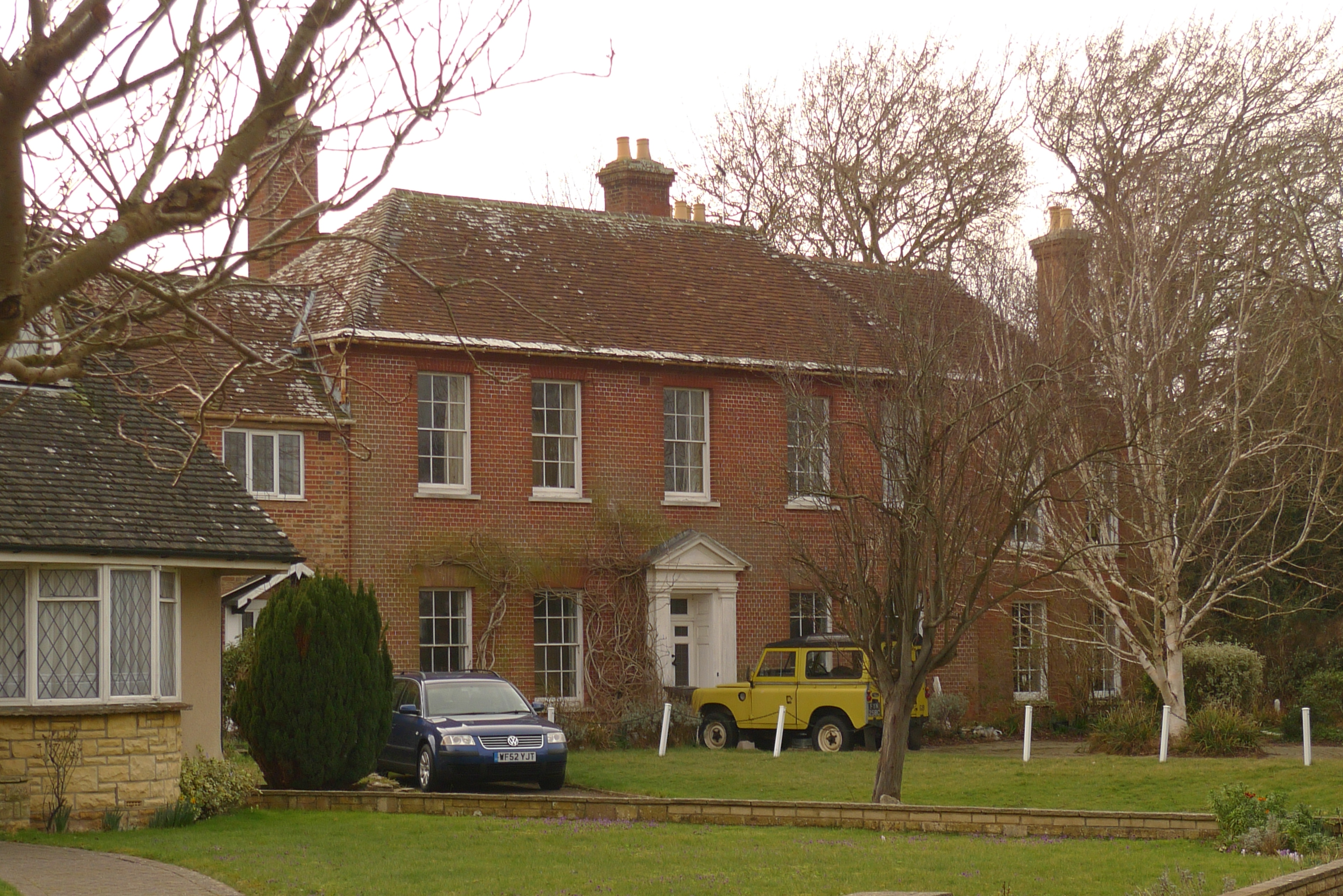
Wick House, 78-84 Wick Lane

Wick today contains a number of Grade II listed buildings, among them Riverside Cottage, a high-pitched thatched cottage adjoining Wick Ferry, and Wick House, a substantial red-brick property almost opposite - probably built in the late eighteenth century for Richard Hughes, a noted informant on local smugglers and the owner of Tuckton Farm. He put the property up for sale in 1784, when it was described as a "modern ... dwelling house in good repair", but there were no takers. The property was successfully auctioned in 1792 when it was purchased by the Sloman family, who eventually over-reached themselves by purchasing several breweries in Somerset; in 1891, John Sloman the Third was adjudged bankrupt with debts of £11,487 13s. 1d. By this point, Wick House had been put into trust, and thus remained occupied by the Slomans until it was sold and divided into four maisonettes in the 1950s.

Further down towards Wick Green, there are more listed cottages including two whitewashed brick and slate properties, 'Quality' and 'Tranqility' (sic): the former was used as a retreat by the music-hall star Ella Shields in the 1930s, while the latter housed a tea-room and village shop, run by a Mrs. Knaggs, into the 1950s. Not far from these properties, in the middle of Wick Green itself, are two grass-choked flagstones covering a well, which was used by villagers into the 1930s.

== Ecology ==
Wick Fields form an important part of the Hengistbury Head Nature Reserve and constitute a Site of Special Scientific Interest (SSSI). Hengistbury Head, Wick Fields and adjacent land were declared a Local Nature Reserve (LNR) on 18 May 1990 under Section 21 of the National Parks and Access to the Countryside Act 1949. The meadows here have not been improved for agriculture and are therefore regarded as ‘ancient grassland’, rich in flowering plants and rushes. An increase in birds has been reported here, including the rare Dartford warbler and the Cetti's warbler. Other birds include the song thrush, skylark, kestrel, barn owl and little owl. The otter is seen here occasionally, as is the now 'uncommon' water vole. A herd of Galloway cattle graze the land; these cattle are ideally suited to the harsh conditions of the coast and estuary and help manage the land by chewing and trampling down any overgrowth.

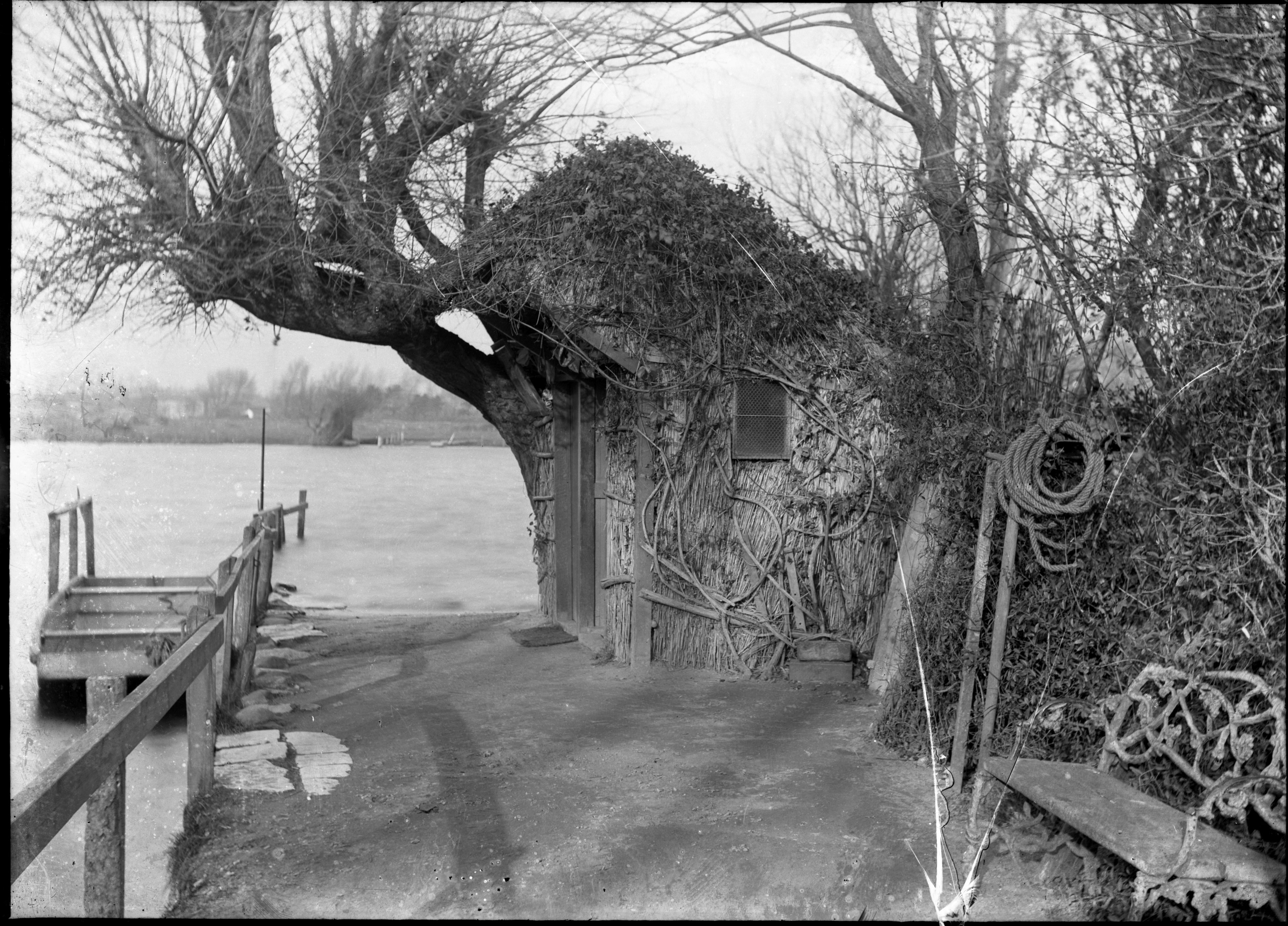
Wick Ferry terminal, 1900

== Wick Ferry ==
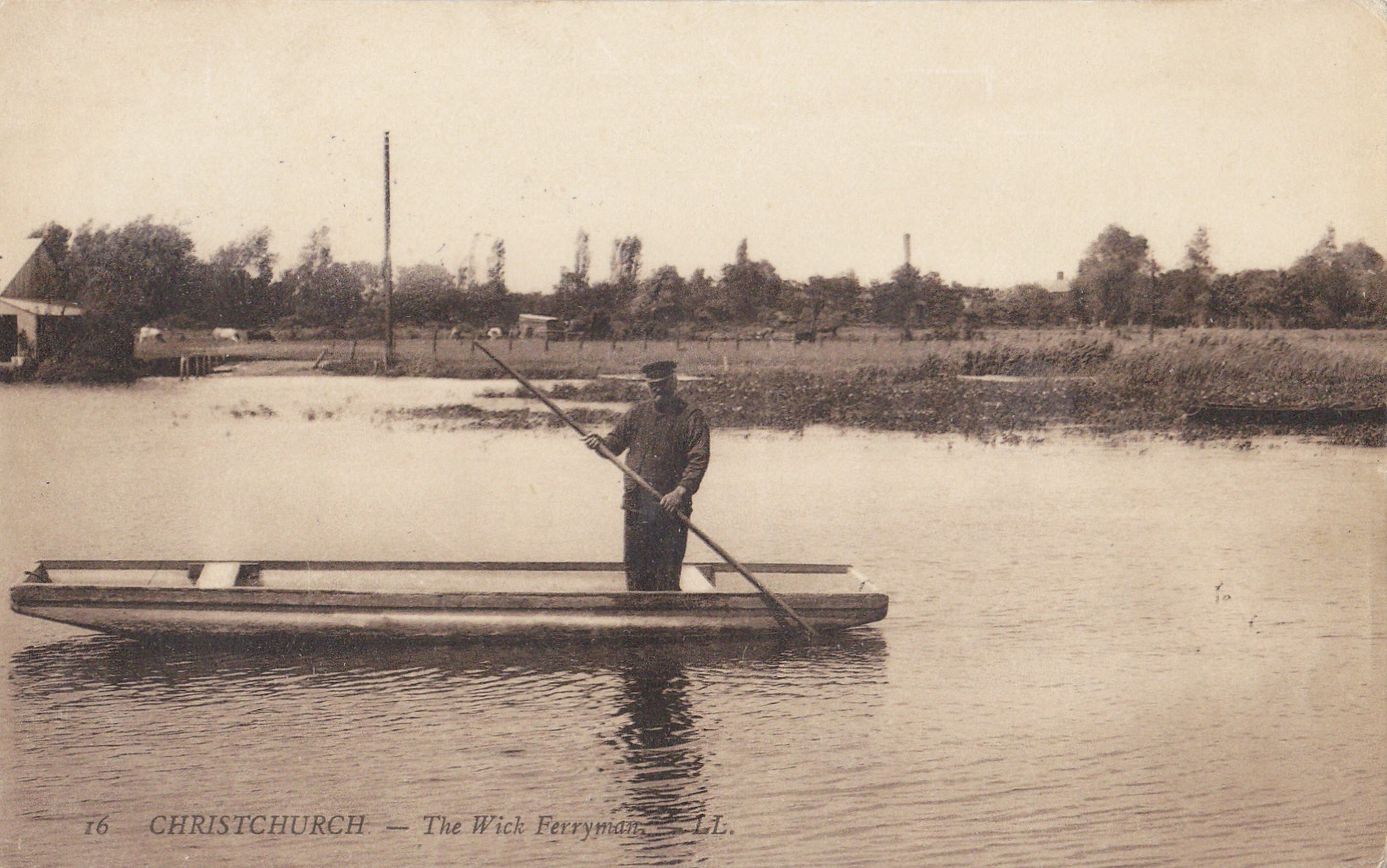
Ferryman at Wick, postmarked 18 February 1913. The ferryman is probably John O'Brien (c. 1847-1929).

There has been a passenger-ferry from Wick across the Stour to Christchurch since about 1815, when it was set up to give employment to a farm labourer named Marshall, who had become unfit for farm work after being kicked in the thigh by a horse. It was operated by punt until 1947 when outboard engines were added to the ferry-boat, after which crossings began to be made in half the time. The service was discontinued for a short period in 1957.

== Bibliography ==
- McKinstry, Alex, The Village of Tuckton, 35,000 B.C. - 1926 (Christchurch: Natula Publications, 2015). ISBN 978-1-897887-32-5
- Popplewell, Lawrence, Wick: The Last Village on the Dorset Stour (Bournemouth Local Studies Publications, 1995, 3rd edn.). ISBN 978-1-873887-07-3
