= Battle of Mudeford =

1784 skirmish between smugglers and customs officers

Coordinates: 50.7249°N 1.741176°W

The Battle of Mudeford was a skirmish fought between smugglers and Customs and Excise officers which occurred in 1784 on what is now a car park at Mudeford Quay, Mudeford, Christchurch, England near the entrance of Christchurch Harbour. The battle showed how widespread smuggling was at the time and resulted in the death of a Customs officer and subsequent trial and execution of one of the smugglers.

== Background ==
Christchurch was an attractive location for the smugglers. The only land access to the town was across two bridges, and the harbour entrance, which is known as "The Run", was hazardous and only negotiable to sailors familiar with the area. At the top of Mothers Sillars channel is a public house called The Ship in Distress still there today, and it was the landlady of the pub, Hannah Seller, after whom the channel is named. She had been married to the landlord of the Haven House on Mudeford Quay, and on his death, she took over the inn, later moving to the Ship in Distress. It appears that she was deeply involved in the 'free-trade': she allowed both pubs to be used for storage, and would induce customers to assist smuggling vessels in difficulties.

On 5 July 1784, the Revenue cutter Rose patrolling in the English Channel sighted sail and pursued the vessel to check its cargo. The vessel was the Civil Usage which was laden with contraband and on sighting the Rose made for Cherbourg. After days of cat and mouse pursuit the captain of the Civil Usage reached Cherbourg and switched his load to aggregate. She made sail for Christchurch, was in due course boarded but allowed to continue. However the captain had to explain his actions to the owner who would certainly have been displeased to be deprived of his illicit goods.

Discussions took place in the Haven Inn and the Civil Usage and the owners other cutter, Phoenix, set off to collect their loot from Cherbourg. Meanwhile, the owner set about mustering 300 men, 100 wagons and 400 horses to move the goods from the Avon beach just east of Mudeford Quay where the cutters traditionally dropped off their illegal cargoes. This massing of manpower could not go unnoticed by the authorities and a young Excise officer named Noyce reported the facts to his superior. Much to Noyce's surprise he was told to go away and that is exactly what he did taking the information to the military station at Lymington.

== Battle ==
Hannah Seller was the landlady of the Haven House Inn at this time and her pub played a pivotal part in the Battle. On Wednesday 14 July, John Streeter supervised the unloading of the two luggers of 5,000 casks of spirits and 400 chests of tea by the men on Avon beach just east of the Run, the luggers having sailed from Cherbourg the previous day. This operation was watched by a Customs vessel the Resolution which sent a longboat to summon help from other Custom vessels in the area. It found the Swan in Poole Bay and the Royal Navy sloop HMS Orestes just off the Needles.

All three boats converged on the harbour entrance about 18:00 on Thursday 15 July. Weather conditions at the time were warm with light and variable winds the sea calm. The smuggler's boats had been moved just inside the harbour to be ballasted. John Streeter, a Christchurch man who had crewed on one of the two luggers, rode to the Haven House, and forced the customers out of the building and down to the beach where they helped strip the luggers of all their lines and rigging.

At sea, activity was just as frenetic. Seeing what was occurring on shore, the captain of the Orestes resolved he would seize or destroy the luggers. As they neared the shore William Allen, the master of the Orestes, hailed the smugglers who remained on the decks of the ships to surrender. As the first boat approached the run it hit a sand bank and Allen jumped out to pull the boat forward. As he did so firing started from the shore he was hit in the leg and in the side. Falling back into the boat he urged his men on though he was fatally wounded. Still some 200 metres from the beach, the naval and revenue men returned fire. A pitched battle ensued but it was an uneven contest: the smugglers were firing from trenches they had dug along the beach, whereas the preventive forces had to take aim from rocking open boats without cover.

This exchange continued for at least 3 hours, the smugglers making to the Haven House Inn for cover and continuing to fire from there. The smugglers had secured their cargo and for the most part disappeared into the surrounding countryside. At three the next morning, with a rising tide, the sailors and Marines entered the harbour again and towed away the luggers towards Cowes with no further opposition.

== Aftermath ==
Three men were eventually arrested for the murder but two were released on a technicality, In 1786 one – George Coombes – was executed at Execution Dock in London and his body returned to Mudeford where it was hung in chains outside the Haven Inn until it was cut down by his friends and buried. John Streeter managed to escape punishment and continued his activities using a tobacco processing plant next to the Ship in Distress as cover. He was still hunted by the authorities and in 1787 William Arnold the collector of customs at Cowes wrote

"Supposed to be now in the Island of Guernsey or Alderney, but occasionally returns to the neighbourhood of Christchurch, where Streeter narrowly escaped from being retaken by disguising himself in woman's clothes."

The battle highlighted the activities of the Christchurch smugglers; however, the size of the cargo does not seem exceptional as there are many accounts and stories illustrating how widespread the free trade was. Strangely, the Christchurch Priory itself seems to have been overlooked by the smugglers unlike their contemporaries elsewhere in England. Another local landmark, The Black House, on the opposite side of the Run from Mudeford Quay, is the subject of a local story, which claims it obtained its distinctive colour when a group of free traders took refuge in the building; the excise officers set fires to smoke the occupants out, blackening the buildings walls, which are still painted black to this day. This is however unlikely to be true since the building dates from after 29 August 1840, when George Holloway took a lease of the land and undertook to build the house within a year, and to paint it 'in good oil colour' at least every four years. The smugglers had resorted to subterfuge in the years following the battle as more effective measures were implemented against them by the coastguard. In the 1840s Britain adopted a free trade policy which brought widespread smuggling to an end.

== Legacy ==
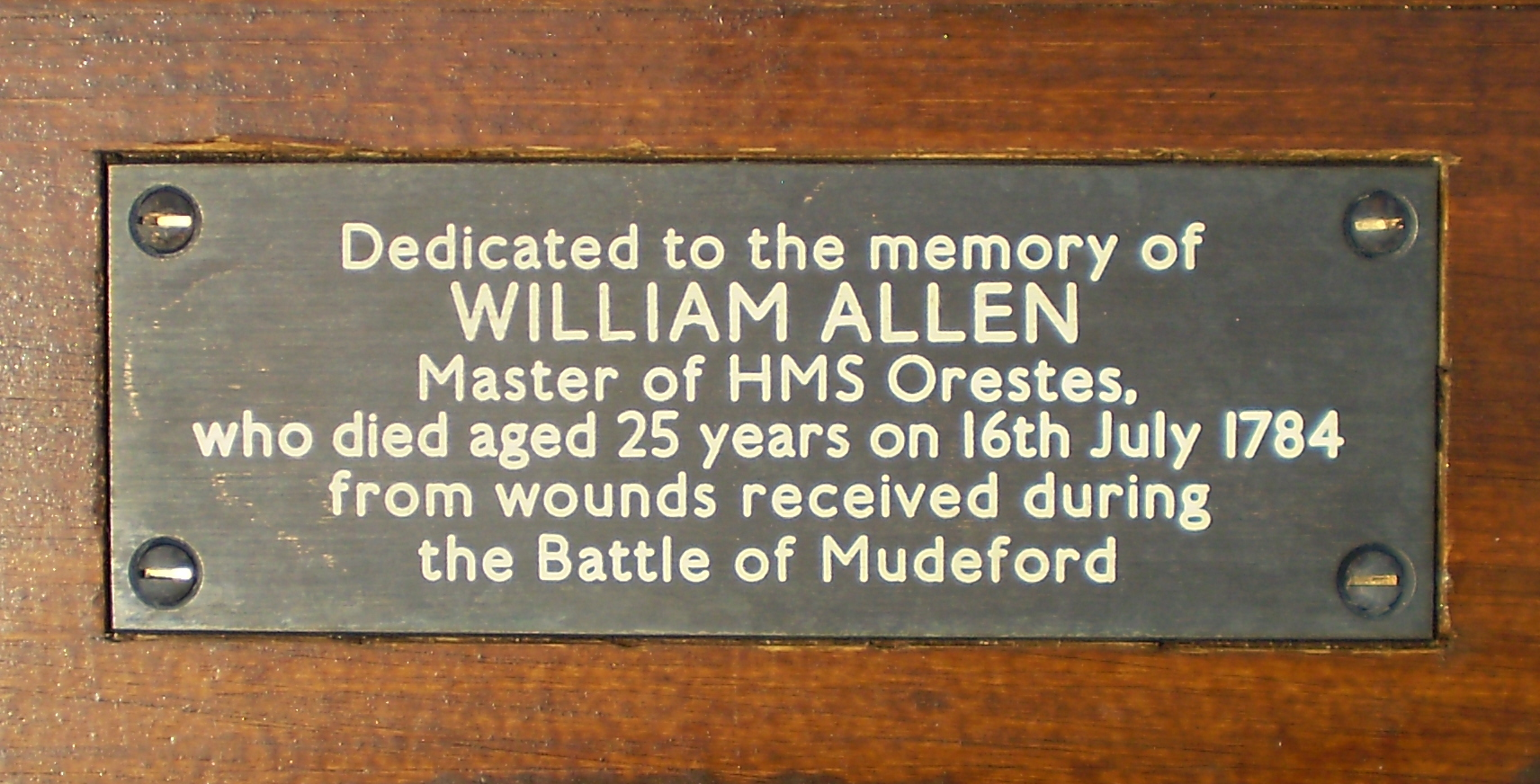
Dedication plate attached to the William Allen Memorial Bench

A creek flowing across Stanpit Marsh on the northern edge of Christchurch Harbour is named Mother Sillar's (sic) Channel after Hannah Seller, the landlady of the Haven House Inn. It is reputed that this creek formerly gave secretive access to the rear of John Streeter's property and the adjacent Ship in Distress Inn at Stanpit. However, the common claim that Hannah Seller was the landlady of the Ship in Distress Inn is unsupported by any known documentary evidence, whereas her tenure of the Haven House is recorded in the Poor Rate Book until the year before her death in 1802. It is not known when the creek acquired its name, but it is shown on the 1872 Ordnance Survey map. In 1836 it was recorded that a sandbank in the harbour was known as Mother Sellars' (sic) shoal. This sandbank is opposite the mouth of Mother Sillar's Channel and has since reverted to its former name of Friscome.

The purpose-built headquarters of the 10th Christchurch (Mudeford) Sea Scouts on Stanpit Recreation Ground, which was officially opened in 1976 by Captain John L N Ommanney, the King's Harbour Master Portsmouth, is named TS Orestes (Training Ship Orestes) in memory of the ship sent to challenge the smugglers.

On Wednesday 6 December 2017, a Battle of Mudeford information panel was unveiled on Mudeford Quay close to the former Haven House Inn (now known as the Dutch House or Dutch Cottages) by the Mayor of Christchurch, Councillor Nick Geary. At the same ceremony an adjacent William Allen Memorial Bench was unveiled by Higher Officer Andrew Finn of UK Border Force, the modern equivalent of the 18th century Revenue service.
