= Montague Hayter =

English cricketer

Personal information
- Full name: Montague William Hayter
- Born: 16 November 1871; Ringwood, Hampshire, England
- Died: 6 May 1948 (aged 76); Christchurch, Hampshire, England
- Batting: Right-handed

Domestic team information
- Years: Team
- 1904: Hampshire

Career statistics
Competition	First-class
Matches	7
Runs scored	166
Batting average	13.83
100s/50s	–/1
Top score	82
Catches/stumpings	3/–
- Source: Cricinfo, 23 December 2009

Montague William Hayter (16 November 1871 – 6 May 1948) was an English first-class cricketer.

The son of Meshach William Hayter and Mary Jane Eaton, he was born in November 1871 at Ringwood, Hampshire. Hayter made his debut in first-class cricket for Hampshire against Leicestershire at Leicester in the 1904 County Championship; he was one of seven consecutive Hampshire debutants in 1904, in what was a weak Hampshire side which would finish last in the County Championship. Hayter made six further first-class appearances for Hampshire in 1904, which included playing against the touring South Africans at Alton. In his seven first-class matches, Hayter scored 166 runs at an average of 13.83; he made one half century, a score of 82 against Derbyshire.

Outside of cricket, he was the head keeper of the Royalty Fishery in Christchurch Harbour from 1909 to 1946. Hayter died at Christchurch in May 1948.
