= Andrew Lamb (engineer) =

British engineer and author

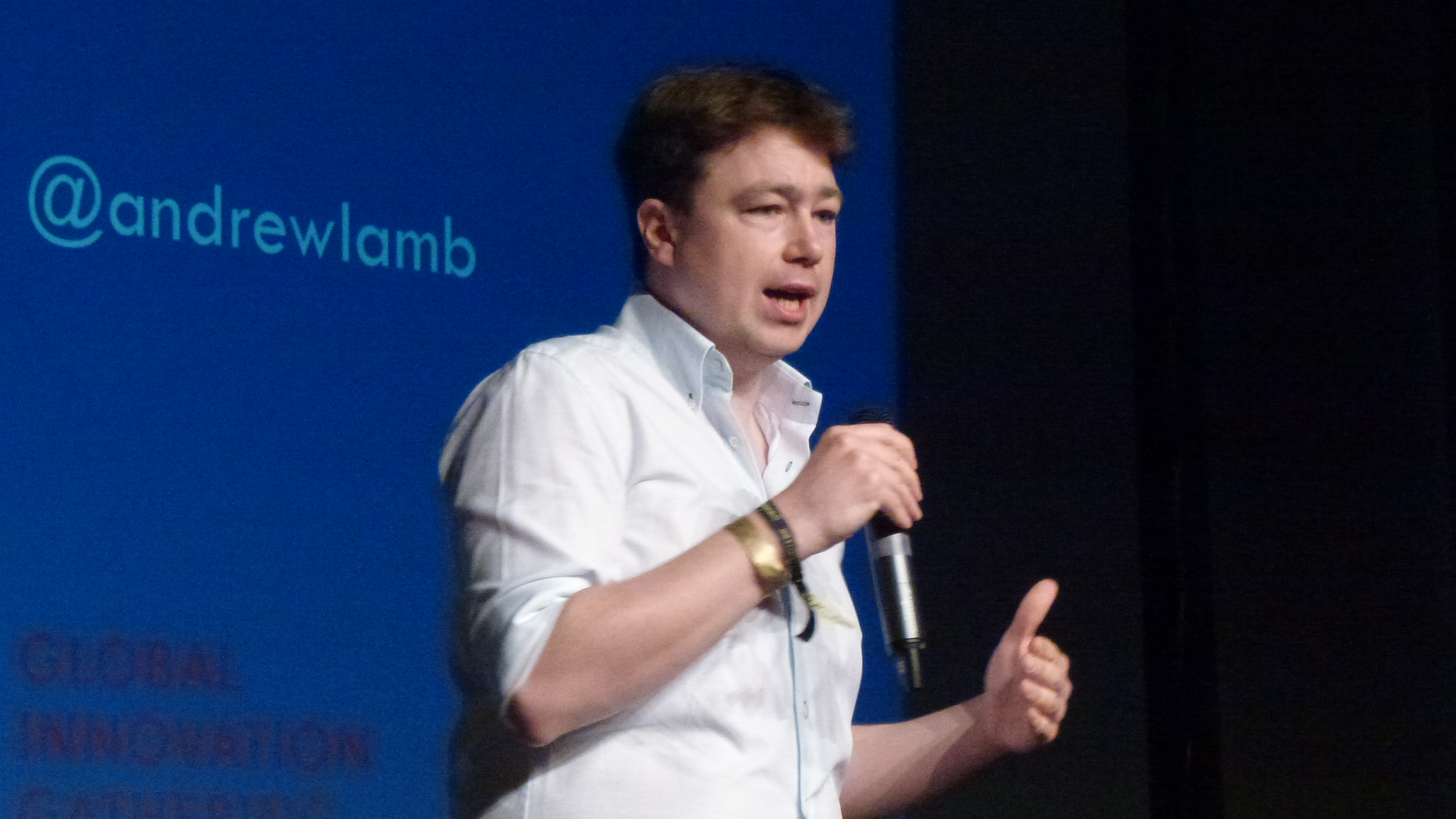
- Education: University of Cambridge
- Occupation: Engineer
- Organization(s): Appropedia Foundation; RedR; Field Ready; UNESCO
- Known for: Promoting local manufacturing of humanitarian aid relief items

Andrew Lamb is an author, engineer, and advocate for the local production of relief items used in humanitarian aid. Lamb was the founder of Engineers without Borders UK where he worked as the CEO. He was a technical editor for the inaugural UNESCO engineering report, as well as two book chapters.

== Education ==
Lamb studied at the University of Cambridge and is a Shuttleworth Foundation fellow.

== Career ==
Lamb launched and ran Engineers without Borders UK as the CEO. He worked RedR-UK for three years before becoming a trustee in 2011. Lamb is a director of Appropedia Foundation and was a trustee for the Centre for Global Equality.

He is an advocate for the local manufacturing of relief goods, having calculated that 40% to 50% of humanitarian aid spending could be saved if they were manufactured local to the emergency. As the engineering adviser for Field Ready Lamb responded to the Haiti earthquake where he used 3D printers to make umbilical cord clamps. Following the Nepal Earthquakes he travelled to Bahrabise and used 3D printers to make components to repair water distribution systems.

== Selected publications ==
- Andrew Lamb, Tony Marjoram, Francoise Lee, Cornelia Hauke and Christina Rafaela Garcia (editorial team); Engineering: Issues, Challenges and Opportunities for Development, 2010, UNESCO, ISBN 9789231041563
- Andrew Lamb and Priti Parikh, Survival in the desert sun: cool food storage, 2015, Global Dimension in Engineering Education, ISBN 9788460675464
- Andrew Lamb and Priti Parikh, Trade and Mobility on the Rooftop of the World: Gravity Ropeways in Nepal, 2015, Global Dimension in Engineering Education, ISBN 9788460675464

== See also ==
- Maker culture
