= Stanpit =

Area of Christchurch, Dorset, England

Coordinates: 50.72°N 1.76°W

- Location within Dorset
- OS grid reference: SZ1792
- Unitary authority: Bournemouth, Christchurch and Poole
- Ceremonial county: Dorset
- Region: South West
- Country: England
- Sovereign state: United Kingdom
- Post town: CHRISTCHURCH
- Postcode district: BH23
- Dialling code: 01202
- Police: Dorset
- Fire: Dorset and Wiltshire
- Ambulance: South Western
- UK Parliament: Christchurch

Stanpit is a neighbourhood of Christchurch in the Bournemouth, Christchurch and Poole unitary authority in the ceremonial county of Dorset, England. Stanpit is within Mudeford parish, and is situated on the shore of Christchurch Harbour, 1 mile (1.6 km) east of Christchurch town centre. Traditionally it is part of the historic county of Hampshire, and was a small village until the growth of the South East Dorset conurbation in the 20th century. The Stanpit road connects from the end of the original Mudeford road through to Purewell Cross.

Stanpit is mentioned in the Domesday Book (1086) as Stanpeta meaning 2 estates with meadows. On Isaac Taylor's 1759 map of Hampshire it is marked as Stampit.

During the 19th-century, the area became known for smuggling and the nearby fishing village of Mudeford was the scene of the so-called 'Battle of Mudeford', a violent conflict between smugglers and revenue men that resulted in the death of a naval officer. The local Scout hut, situated on Stanpit recreation ground is named Orestes after the Royal Navy cutter which took part. The recreation ground is also the site of an annual bonfire and firework event, commemorating the gunpowder plot. It takes place on or around 5 November and includes competitions and refreshments with the proceeds benefitting local youth organisations.

== History ==
Stanpit was named in the Domesday Book of 1086, in the Edgegate Hundred.

== Stanpit Marsh ==
The area known as Stanpit Marsh is a mixture of habitats including areas of salt marsh, reed beds, freshwater marsh, gravel estuarine banks and sandy scrub. It was formed as the result of action and deposition of material from the rivers Stour and Avon as they meet with the salt water within Christchurch Harbour. Together with contiguous Grimbury (or sometimes Grimmery) Marsh, it forms one of the largest areas of salt marsh in the county. Stanpit Marsh is a Site of Special Scientific Interest (SSSI) and an important nature reserve of about 65 hectares (160 acres), combining both freshwater and saltwater habitats. There are over 300 species of plants growing there and 14 of them are considered to be nationally rare and endangered. It is used by 312 species of bird, a few of which breed there. Many others are migratory and use the marsh as an important staging point. In 2001 a successful breeding program for Natterjack Toads was established. The site is owned by Christchurch Borough Council and managed by Christchurch Countryside Service.

The name of Grimbury Marsh can be traced back to the 13th century, where it appears as Greneburgh in the Christchurch Priory cartulary. This name can be translated as 'green fort' and may be a reference to Crouch Hill, the highest point on the marsh, which has also been known as Grimbury Hill.

Crouch Hill is a grass covered dune or Bronze Age burial mound. It stands 5 metres above sea level. In 1921-22 the mound was excavated by Harold St George Gray. Because of the amount of 19th century material recovered, he was convinced that it was of modern origin, despite the quantity of prehistoric material also found. In 1969 an excavation by Michael Ridley recovered flints, Neolithic Grooved Ware, and an almost complete Bronze Age inverted collared urn containing the cremated remains of a child. In 1987, Dr Thomas C Welsh identified possible ancient earthworks in the vicinity, including another mound, named Druid's Mound, that had also been excavated by Gray.

To the east of Crouch hill lies Blackberry Point. In the past this was a small island within the Harbour known locally as Horseshoe Island. Today it has become firmly attached to the marsh.

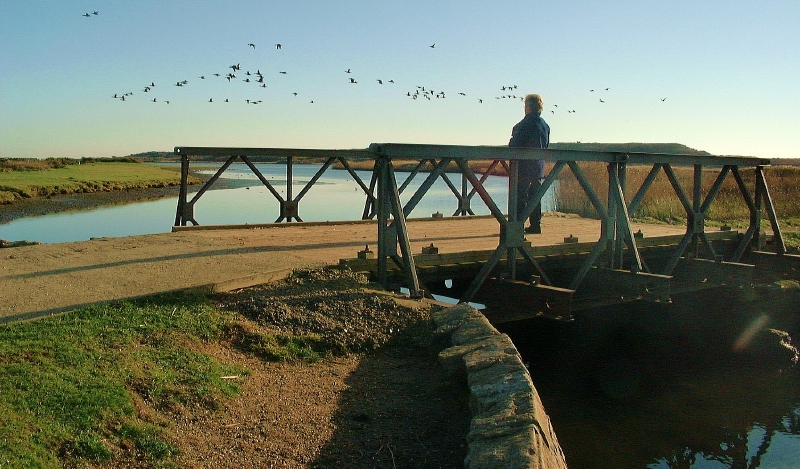
Bailey bridge over Mother Sillars Channel at Stanpit Marsh

A circular path on the marsh crosses Mother Siller's Channel by way of a Bailey bridge of the sort developed in Christchurch. In 1984 the original prototype Bailey bridge was replaced by the present bridge, which was donated by the local Royal Armament Research and Development Establishment (RARDE). Mother Siller's Channel is named after an 18th-century smuggler, Hannah Seller, the landlady of the Haven House at Mudeford and also reputedly of the Ship in Distress at Stanpit. It is thought that this channel, now silted up, used to lead to the back of the Ship in Distress and thus was a convenient and secretive 'trade' route.

On the west side of the marsh the path goes past a stranded rusting hull, now fenced off for safety. Known locally as the Iron Boat, this was formerly the lifeboat of a WW2 Liberty ship. Its origin remains uncertain, but it was seemingly acquired in the 1950s by a boating club at the local Portchester School for boys (now Avonbourne Boys' Academy). It subsequently changed hands and is believed to have been deposited on the marsh by a severe storm in 1964.

=== Formation and development ===
The marsh is geologically relatively new, the oldest parts date back about 10,000 years. Ever since the formation of the harbour, when the lower valleys of the rivers Avon and Stour were flooded by a post-glacial rise in sea level; the two rivers have been depositing their sediment in the shallow waters. During periods of low tide, channels and creeks began to appear and the isolated banks of silt became colonised by plants such as Glassworts, Sea Purslane and Seablite all of which have a high tolerance to salt water. These plants caused the flow of water to decrease further and thus more sediment was deposited. Eventually the mud banks grew above the high tide level and other vegetation was able to develop.

The marsh is continuing to change and evolve. Separated from the older Stanpit Marsh by the Mother Siller's Channel is the more recent Grimbury marsh and to the south-east, the even more recent addition of Blackberry Island. Parts of the marsh have been drained and now provide grazing land for ponies.

The Marsh has a history of human activity dating back to 5000 BC. Excavations in 1969 on the eastern bank of Mother Siller's Channel revealed finds left by Mesolithic nomadic people (3000 BC). As well as flint fragments, traces of Purbeck Limestone and Portland stone were discovered showing evidence of human movements across Dorset. There have been considerable rises in the sea level over during the marshes existence. Finds up to the early Bronze Age were also made during these excavations. After the Iron Age material evidence of human activities is rare.

The area was designated as a Local Nature Reserve in 1964 and a Site of Special Scientific Interest in 1986.

== The Ship in Distress public house ==
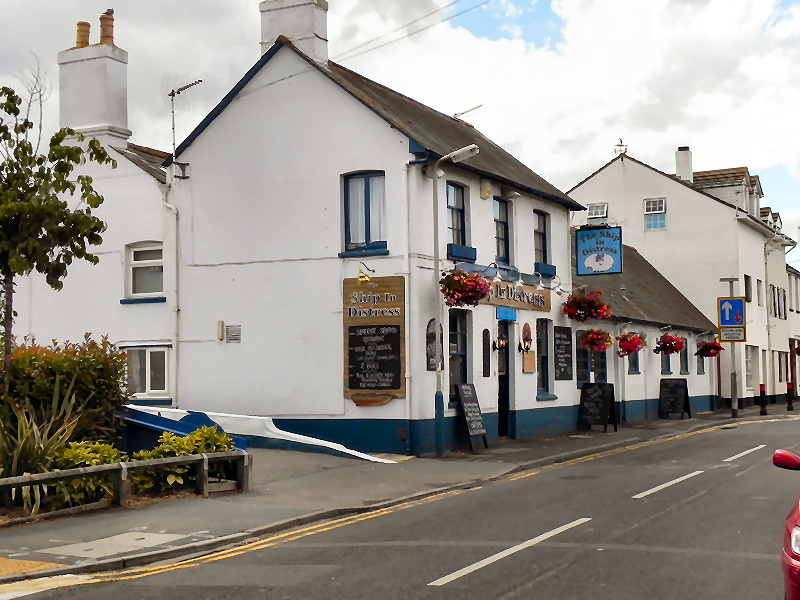
The Ship in Distress

The Ship in Distress public house is located at the top of Mothers Sillars Channel, along the Stanpit road. It was the landlady of the pub, Hannah Seller, who the channel is named after. She had been married to the landlord of the Haven House on Mudeford Quay, and on his death, she took over the inn, later moving to The Ship in Distress. It appears that she was deeply involved in the free-trade: she allowed both pubs to be used for storage and would induce customers to assist smuggling vessels in difficulties.

Next door to the pub was a tobacco and snuff factory, owned by the by then 'respectable' John Streeter who had earlier been gaoled for his part in the battle. Perhaps not unsurprisingly, many of the deliveries came at night and other local tobacco traders complained that they were unable to compete with Streeter.

== Tutton's Well ==
Tutton's Well is a small publicly accessible grassy space on the west of Stanpit road a short distance south of the Ship in Distress public house. On the site is a fresh water spring that is reputed to be of great antiquity and have special healing properties, especially for improving eyesight. In 1884 it was reported that it was "mentioned in ancient documents as a mineral well, and is supposed to possess properties highly beneficial to persons afflicted with weak eyes. The water is even now frequently carried away to different parts of the country for eye bathing". The following year, eminent Bournemouth based physician Horace Dobell similarly wrote that "one spring at Stanpit has a mediæval fame as a good water and curative agent (monkish specific for blindness). It is a soft, shallow, wayside well".

According to an anonymous letter printed in the local Christchurch Times newspaper in 1868, the name of the site dates to the Civil War period. The story claims that Oliver Cromwell and his attendants were one day riding past after reconnoitring the area. Being a hot day, Cromwell wanted to water his horse, so asked an old man if the patch of muddy water nearby was drinkable. The man said that it was too brackish, but directed him to a pool of fresh water, from which both Cromwell and his horse drank. The name of the old man was George Touting. However, although some Parliamentarian activity did take place in the area, there is no evidence that Cromwell himself was ever present. The place-name suffix –ton is often derive from an Anglo-Saxon term for an enclosure or farmstead, which suggests that the name may have a far earlier origin.

In 1885 the Well was informally granted to the local inhabitants as a public water supply by the landowner, Sir William Rose, with the wish that it should commemorate his late parents, the Rt. Hon. Sir George Henry Rose and Dame Frances, of Sandhills, Mudeford. It was subsequently acquired by the council. The spring continued to supply the local residents with fresh water into the 20th century, even after all other public pumps and wells were closed in 1899. Nevertheless, it soon began to fall into disrepair.

In 1996, concerns about the rebuilding of a Guides' hut on the site prompted the creation of a Tutton's Well Preservation Society to preserve, retain, enhance and restore the historical features of the site. In 2002 this became the Friends of Tutton's Well. Archaeological investigations at the centre of the plot found a rubble-filled shaft that was constantly refilled with fresh water and tests confirmed the relative purity of the water. The group subsequently erected stone features on the site to commemorate its long history.

== Politics ==
Stanpit is part of the Christchurch parliamentary constituency for elections to the House of Commons. It is currently represented by Conservative MP Christopher Chope.

Mudeford is also part of the Mudeford, Stanpit and West Highcliffe wards for elections to Bournemouth, Christchurch and Poole Council.
