= Field Ready =

- Formation: 2013
- Type: International NGO
- Headquarters: Evanston, Illinois
- Website: https://www.fieldready.org/

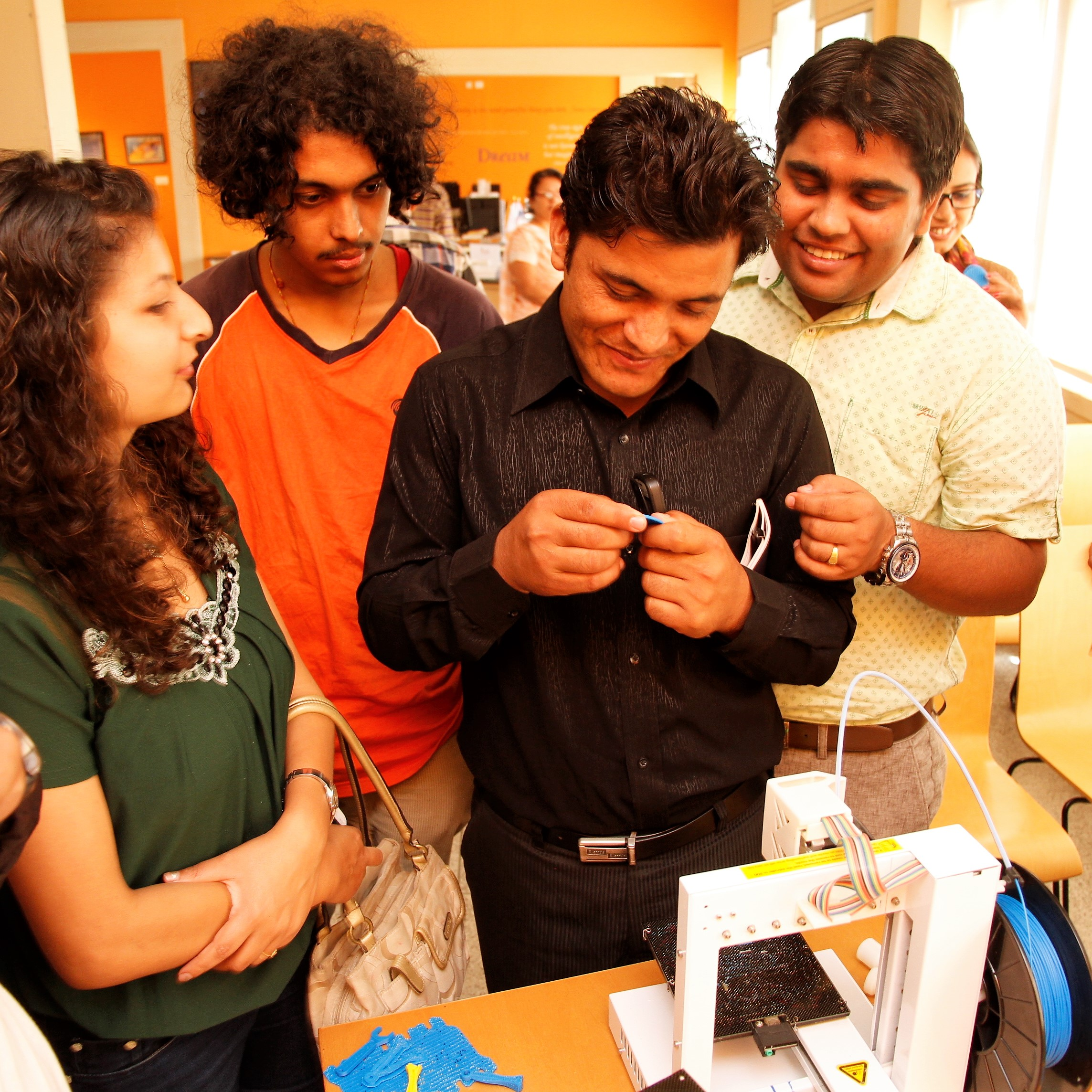
Field Readystaff showing students how to use a 3D printer in Kathmandu, Nepal in 2018

Field Ready is a non-profit, global humanitarian aid and development, non governmental organization that helps provide critical items and training to people when they are in need of them.

Field Ready focuses its efforts on aiding individuals and communities both during emergencies and renovation with healthcare; WASH (water, sanitation and hygiene) assistance; digital design, manufacturing and training and capacity building. According to the organization, more than 1 million people in a half-dozen countries – including the U.S. – benefited from Field Ready programs in 2020 and 2021.

== History ==
Frustrated that 60% to 80% of humanitarian aid funds are spent on complex logistics that often delay getting critical items to where they’re most needed, founders Eric James, Dara Dotz and Nick Haan began Field Ready’s initial outreach in 2013 in Haiti, using 3D printers (additive manufacturing) to make medical devices and items to help restore power in remote areas that were still suffering the devastating effects of the 2010 earthquake.

James and Dotz recruited engineers and other tech-oriented workers to join the organization’s efforts to help disaster-affected people. Using digital design, 3D printers and locally available materials, Field Ready deployed these specialists in Port-au-Prince from 2013 to 2015 and partnered with local aid groups to meet on-the-ground demand in select healthcare facilities. Making items such as umbilical clamps for new mothers and their babies and parts needed for solar panels to restore power, staff also began training local individuals to design and make additional needed items to help area residents.

Over the next few years, the organization expanded and James built more partnerships with aid organizations including UNICEF, World Vision, Save the Children and others to serve disaster- and conflict-affected individuals in additional countries. In 2014, Field Ready began its first aid project in the U.S., working to teach 3D printing skills to unaccompanied children who arrived in Texas from Central America.

In 2015, Field Ready responded to the catastrophic Nepal earthquake by starting a digital manufacturing lab in Kathmandu to manufacture whatever was needed in the disaster area – including much-needed medical devices and repair equipment. Over the next year, Field Ready trained more than 600 Nepalis to work the lab’s machinery and made more than 5,000 items for local distribution.

In 2017, the organization partnered with aid agencies in South Sudan, Kenya and Syria, to help provide water and sanitation facilities, establish training and manufacturing workshops, repair medical devices and design new products - including rescue air-bags to help trapped individuals escape collapsed buildings in war-torn areas.

By 2018, Field Ready also deployed staff in Jordan, Turkey, Iran, Iraq, East Timor and Colombia. Also in 2018, the agency established its first South Pacific office and workshop in Suva, Fiji.

Field Ready is registered and headquartered as a 501c3 in Evanston, Illinois, in the U.S.; it is also registered in Australia, Fiji, the Netherlands, the United Kingdom, Iraq and the Philippines.

== Approach ==
Field Ready relies on a transformational approach to humanitarian relief even when working in the most remote and challenging places on earth. Field Ready meets humanitarian and reconstruction aid needs by transforming logistics through technology, design and engaging people in new ways. The organization’s pioneering use of networked, distributed manufacturing has been widely recognized by the humanitarian sector

== Programs ==
Field Ready currently carries out programs in a half-dozen countries/regions, including:

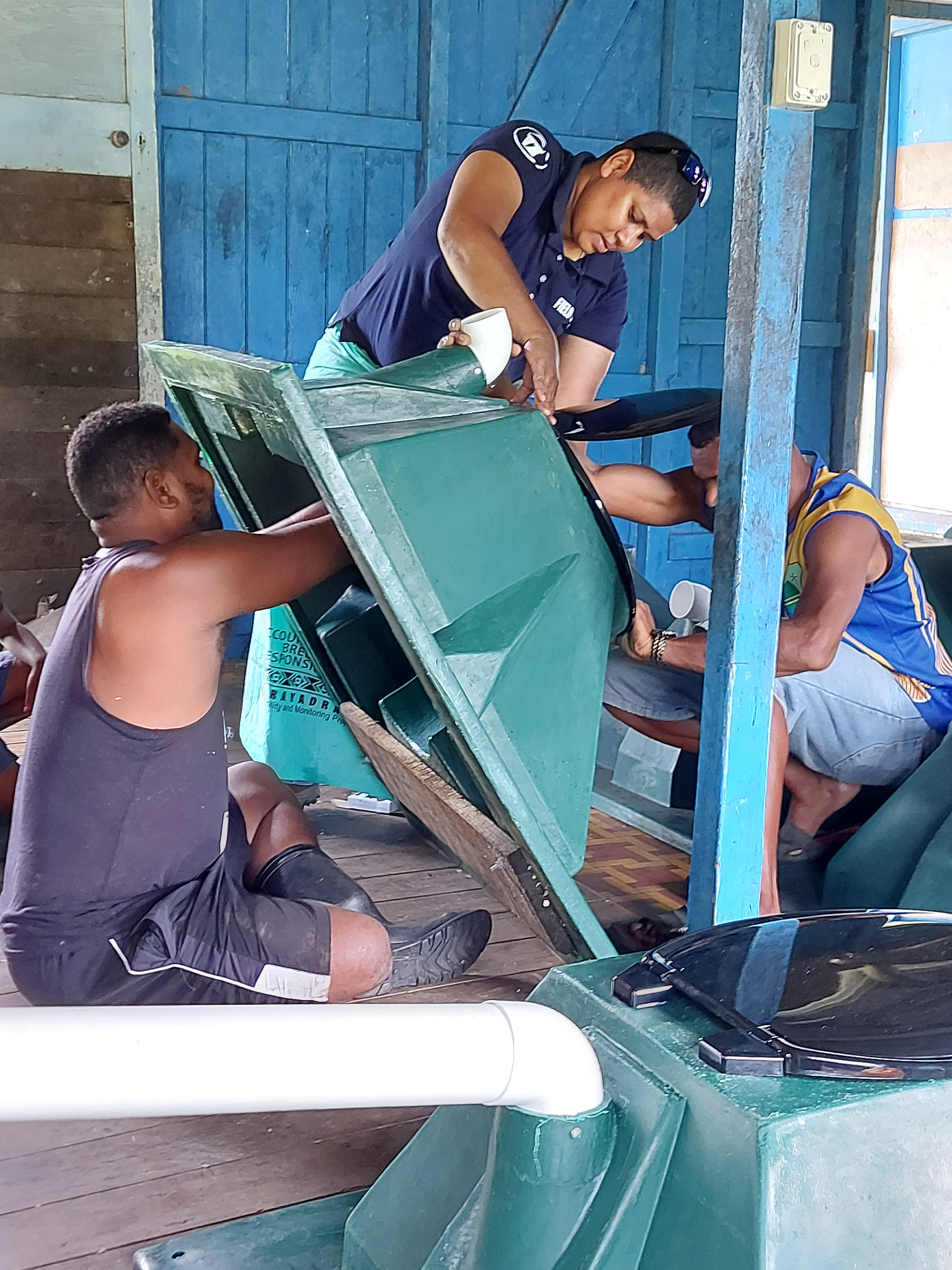
Field Ready staff and community residents install a latrine in rural Fiji, 2021

South Pacific: Field Ready works in three Pacific island countries (Fiji, Vanuatu, Samoa) to reduce disaster-risk concerns and prepare people for future disasters with a focus on WASH, accessibility for physically challenged people and disaster preparedness. The organization is currently manufacturing and delivering newly specially designed, injection-molded latrines; portable, foot-operated handwashing stations and foot-operated taps and privacy screens to rural communities, schools and healthcare facilities, as well as retrofitting churches to make them generally accessible for physically challenged individuals and able to serve communities during emergencies.

Iraq: Field Ready established partnerships in Erbil, Mosul, Baghdad and Sulimaniyah to train more than 1,000 Iraqis in digital design and manufacturing, encourage entrepreneurship and help start-up businesses thrive. It hosted workshops, seminars, presentations and competitions in the country to spur innovative solutions and support local economies while helping to produce personal protective equipment (PPE) for thousands of frontline workers.

Syria: With local partners, Field Ready mapped and surveyed more than 40 hospitals and healthcare facilities in Northwest Syria, where the healthcare system has been decimated, to learn what medical devices and equipment caregivers needed to serve residents in the war-torn region. With support from Creating Hope in Conflict: A Humanitarian Grand Challenge, Field Ready’s medical device repair program then fixed 215 devices and pieces of medical equipment; an independent evaluation noted that the program helped more than 160,000 patients get critical medical services in 2020 and 2021, saved more than 66% of traditional costs and delivered aid 44% faster than traditional transportation.

Nepal and Bhutan: Field Ready has established local partnerships to spur innovation and help train thousands in digital design and manufacturing, advanced agriculture solutions and production of PPE through makerspaces and university-supported programs. The agency's support helped Nepal’s first FabLab open in March 2021.

U.S.: In response to the 2020 COVID-19 pandemic, Field Ready and its partners helped provide PPE for thousands of under-funded frontline workers and homeless or economically challenged individuals in eight states and helped sponsor community-based efforts to make PPE for needy individuals.

COVID-19 PPE Project: In 2021 Field Ready established a pilot program with the humanitarian organizations NeedsList and Humanitarian OpenStreetMap Team, with support from Creating Hope In Conflict: a Humanitarian Grand Challenge, to help frontline workers in Bangladesh, Iraq, Kenya and Uganda match COVID-19-related needs to local manufacturing capabilities to supply workers in conflict- and disaster-affected areas with PPE. The program aimed to help more than 100,000 first responders and frontline workers secure PPE in those countries; as of April 2022, it had already received more than 500,000 orders for PPE and supplied more than 250,000 face shields, masks, goggles and hand sanitizers to first responders.

Field Ready also maintains a rapid-response capacity and has deployed staff to hurricane hit areas in The Bahamas (2019), the U.S. Virgin Islands (2018) and addressed humanitarian concerns in Bangladesh, Jordan and South Sudan.

== Awards and recognition ==
GuideStar gives Field Ready its highest rating, Platinum, for accountability and transparency. Charity Navigator rates the organization at 78%, based solely on Financial Accountability and Transparency. As of 2019, the Better Business Bureau recognized Field Ready with its highest rating of A+.

Field Ready’s work has been recognized with the Massachusetts Institute of Technology's Innovators Under 35 Award, the Aid & International Development Forum Innovator Award and the Index Project Design Award. In 2020, James received Rotary International’s Humanitarian STAR Award (Science, Technology, Aerospace, Robotics) for outstanding scientific and technological achievements with significant humanitarian benefit.

In 2022, Field Ready won a Honey Bee Network Creativity & Inclusive Innovation Award (from 2020, delayed by the COVID-19 pandemic) for its Surprise Soap, a clear soap with a plastic toy embedded in it that encourages children to wash their hands and thus help improve community hygiene.

Field Ready has also been a finalist for Fast Company's World Changing Ideas Award (2018) and in 2019 was a finalist for the Peter F. Drucker Award for Non-Profit Innovation. In 2020, the organization was one of 12 finalists for the EU Innovation Horizon Prize.

== Funding ==
Field Ready is largely funded by government programs and institutional donors, and is also supported by individual donors. Its programs include funding from UNICEF, the U.S. Agency for International Development (USAID) and its Bureau for Humanitarian Assistance, the U.K.’s Foreign, Commonwealth and Development Office (FCDO), Australia’s Department of Foreign Affairs and Trade (DFAT), the Australian Humanitarian Partnership (AHP), the Fiji Ministry of Health and Medical Services (FijiMoHMS), Humanitarian Grand Challenge Canada and others.

== See also ==
- Open Source Medical Supplies
