= Tuckton =

Settlement in Bournemouth, Dorset, England

Coordinates: 50.728°N 1.792°W

- Location within Dorset
- OS grid reference: SZ147921
- Unitary authority: Bournemouth, Christchurch and Poole
- Ceremonial county: Dorset
- Region: South West
- Country: England
- Sovereign state: United Kingdom
- Post town: BOURNEMOUTH
- Postcode district: BH6
- Dialling code: 01202
- Police: Dorset
- Fire: Dorset and Wiltshire
- Ambulance: South Western
- UK Parliament: Bournemouth East

Tuckton is a suburb of Bournemouth, situated on the River Stour in the eastern part of the borough, in England. First recorded in 1271, this was a hamlet in the tithing of Tuckton and Wick until 1894, when the Local Government Act replaced all tithings in England and Wales with civil parishes and district councils. At that point, Tuckton became part of the civil parish of Southbourne, which was absorbed into the Borough of Bournemouth in 1901.

== Pre-history ==
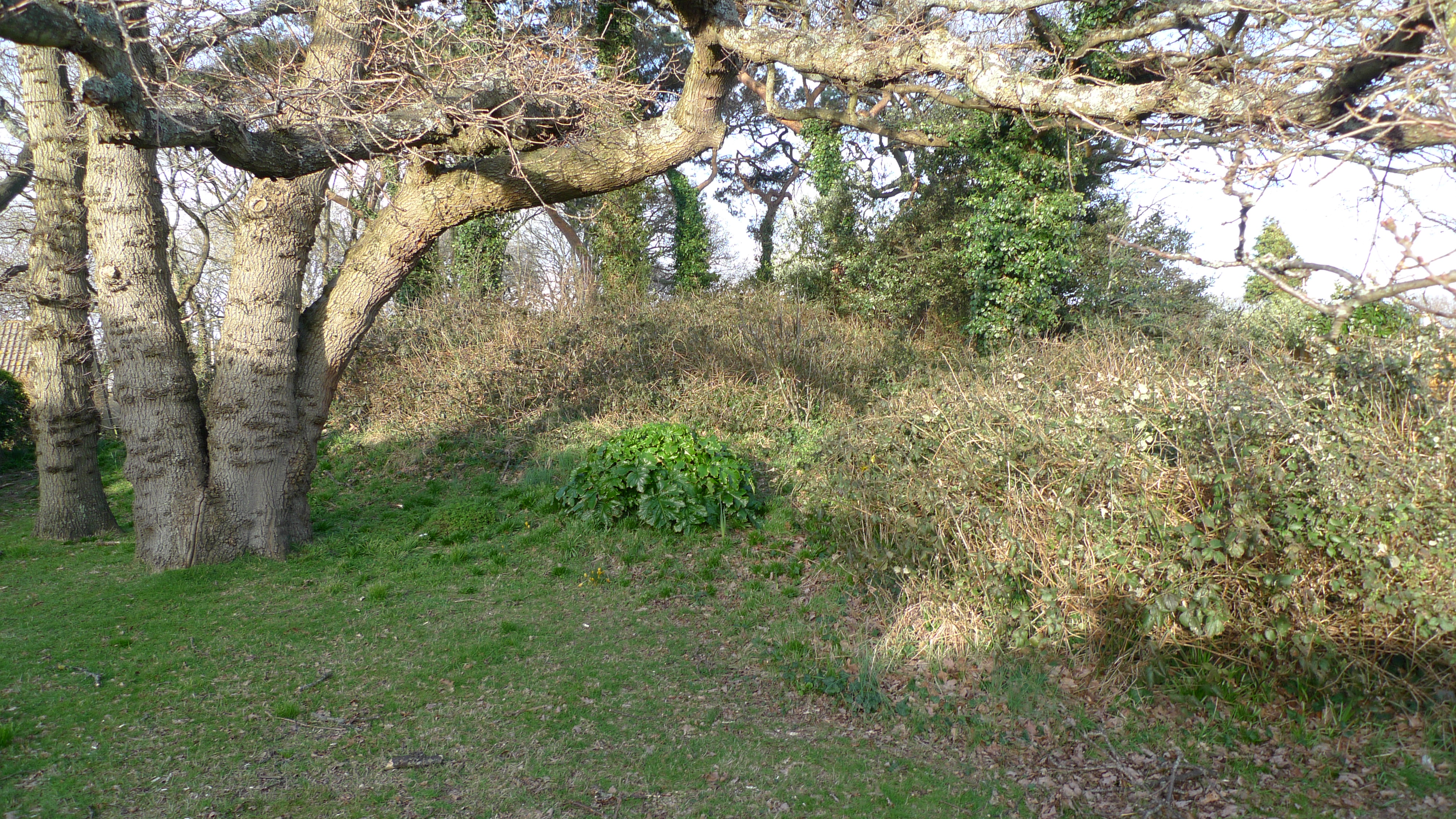
Tumulus on the south side of Wick Lane, Tuckton

The lower reaches of Tuckton, including the shops in Tuckton Road, stand on one of the very flat gravel terraces that lie beneath much of modern Bournemouth. These terraces were formed around 35,000 BC, when a series of temperature fluctuations led to a rise in sea levels, inundating the Solent and its tributaries - which included the River Stour, in embryo form. In 1925, when a sewer was being dug beneath the present Broadway, a palaeolithic hand-axe was recovered from one of these terraces, in mint condition - later complemented by a similar relic, excavated near the Wildown Road junction in 1931. Further implements, plus the remains of sixteen Bronze Age cremation urns, were recovered in the 1920s from the site of Magnolia Close - just yards from an Early Bronze Age tumulus in Wick Lane, the largest of seven surviving tumuli in the Bournemouth borough.

== Tuckton Farm ==
The land at Tuckton was put to agricultural use into the early twentieth century. Originally this land formed part of the Manor of Christchurch, but in 1698 the Lord of the Manor, Henry Hyde, 2nd Earl of Clarendon, began selling off land to settle the debts of his alcoholic transvestite son. The large copyhold estate at Tuckton was sold for £350. It went through several owners including John Sloman of Wick House, who began breeding pigs on the unproductive plateau above Tuckton in the 1840s. The venture was a failure, and this land was eventually sold to Dr. Thomas Armetriding Compton, who founded the resort of Southbourne there in 1871. When Compton purchased the land it was still festooned with the remains of pigsties, equipped with very deep foundations in an effort to outwit the local rabbit population.

== The Tolstoy colony ==
In 1900 a group of followers of Leo Tolstoy took up residence at Tuckton House, now the site of 9-17 Saxonbury Road. They were headed by Vladimir Chertkov, Tolstoy's literary agent, who had been ordered into exile from Russia in 1897 after clashing with the Tsar. Chertkov opted for a British exile: like his mother (who had holidayed in Southbourne since the 1870s), he was a committed Anglophile, and knew that the tradition of free speech in England would be of benefit to his campaigns. Chertkov and his circle traded at Tuckton as the Free Age Press, producing English-language versions of Tolstoy's religious and ethical works and using the silted-up waterworks in Iford Lane as their printing press. It is estimated that the Free Age Press produced 424 million words of Tolstoy's writing during its comparatively short existence.

Most of the colony returned to Russia with Chertkov in 1908, after the Tsar issued a general amnesty to political exiles. The Tuckton House estate was then steadily sold off, the proceeds funding a complete edition of Tolstoy's works in Russian - a mammoth project that ultimately extended to ninety volumes, and was still in progress when Chertkov died in 1936. Tuckton House itself was sold to Mrs. C. Angus in 1929, and renamed Tuckton Nursing Home; she continued to preside over the births, deaths and tonsillectomies of Tuckton residents until selling up at the age of ninety-one in 1965, whereupon the property was demolished.

The house called 'Slavanka' in Belle Vue Road was used by Countess Chertkov as a holiday home before the Revolution. When she escaped in 1917 she returned to Slavanka but had to sell it as an Evangelical Conference Centre. She remained in the house until her death in 1922 and is buried in Christchurch Cemetery.

== Tuckton Bridge ==
Tuckton Bridge Act 1881
- Act of Parliament
- Parliament of the United Kingdom
- Long title: An Act for making and maintaining a Road and Bridge across the River Stour in the Parish of Christchurch and County of Southampton.
- Citation: 44 & 45 Vict. c. iv

Dates
- Royal assent: 8 April 1881

Other legislation
- Repealed by: Bournemouth Borough Council Act 1985

Status: Repealed

Text of statute as originally enacted

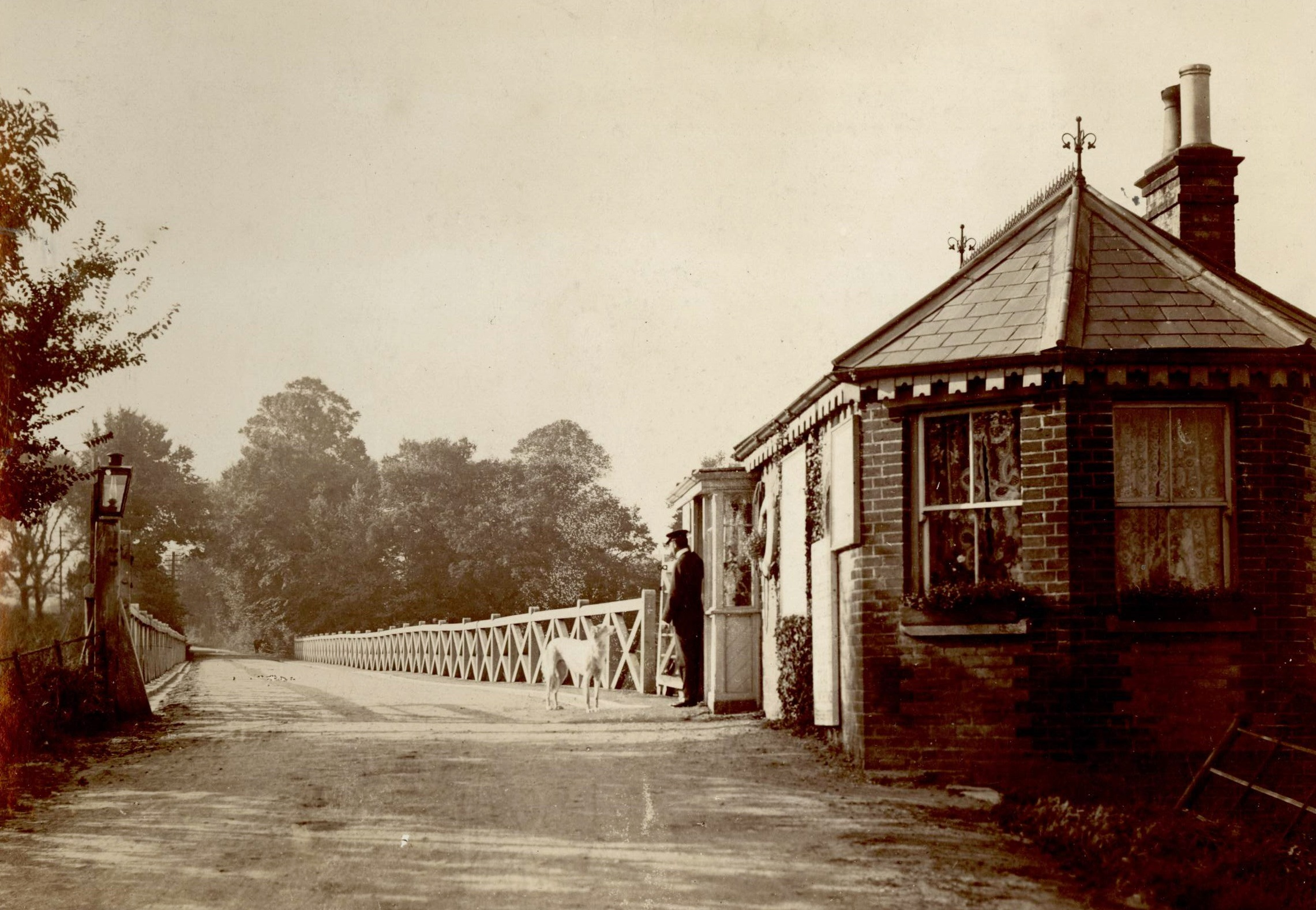
The original wooden bridge at Tuckton

Tuckton is also notable for being the lowest bridging point over the Stour. The first bridge here, a wooden toll structure on iron piles, was opened to carriage traffic in May 1883. It was replaced by the present structure in 1905. The present bridge was designed to bear the weight of the Bournemouth Corporation trams, whose routes were being extended to Christchurch; accordingly, it was built using the Hennebique ferro-concrete construction method, then gaining popularity in England. When built, it was the longest Hennebique bridge in Britain (at 347 ft.), as well as being the first such bridge to carry a tramway. The tolls were abolished in 1943, though the toll-house continued to stand until 1955, and was used as a squat by the Booth family during the post-war housing crisis; the only drawback to living there, said Mrs. Booth, was that strangers knocked on the door at 2 a.m. asking how much it was to cross.

== Politics ==
Tuckton is part of the Bournemouth East parliamentary constituency. Tuckton is also part of the East Southbourne and Tuckton ward which elects two councillors to Bournemouth, Christchurch and Poole Council.

== Recent history ==
The first shops in Tuckton were built on the south side of Tuckton Road in 1925, following the piecemeal selling-off of the Tuckton Farm estate. The rickyard and farm buildings, which stretched along the north side of Tuckton Road, between Iford Lane and Riverside Lane, were put up for auction in 1926 when the farm ceased trading altogether.

As Bournemouth developed to the west, Tuckton became a popular setting for watersports and other recreational pursuits. One of the first riverside businesses here, Tuckton Creeks, was set up in 1903. This offered boat trips along the Stour to Mudeford, and the taking of light luncheons, served on the upper deck of a beached lugger in the days before the site acquired a pavilion. The site was initially run by William Nutter-Scott and his Armenian wife, Phœnicia Yevbraxeh Nargise Zérène, but was reassigned to two newcomers in 1919 after a number of their boats sank, making Mrs. Nutter-Scott a familiar presence at inquests. (Her husband had deserted her in 1911.) The site was renamed Tuckton Tea Gardens, and continues to operate today, having been in Bournemouth Borough Council ownership since 1963. Mrs. Nutter-Scott later became Tuckton's only recorded rag-and-bone woman, walking around the suburb and collecting rubbish in a canvas-backed Bath chair.

Meanwhile, on the Christchurch side of Tuckton Bridge, Arthur Vine established the Tuckton Golf School in 1932 which eventually evolved into the Tuckton Golf and Leisure Park, built up by Harry Stiller and distinguished by the four-acre model landscape known as Tucktonia, which attracted thousands of visitors a year until it closed in 1986.

Until the publication of McKinstry's The Village of Tuckton, no satisfactory account of the settlement's history had been presented. Tuckton had suffered somewhat from not being Iford, for which histories do exist nor Wick, also the subject of a small study. Even Tuckton's water works, where the Russian colony laboured, has gone down in history as 'Old Water Works', Iford Lane.

== Bibliography ==
McKinstry, Alex, The Village of Tuckton, 35,000 B.C. - 1926 (Christchurch: Natula Publications, 2015). ISBN 9781897887325
