= 2027 Bournemouth, Christchurch and Poole Council election =

2027 English local election

- 6 May 2027

All 76 seats on Bournemouth, Christchurch and Poole Council 39 seats needed for a majority

	First party	Second party	Third party
Leader	Millie Earl	Phil Broadhead	George Farquhar
Party	Liberal Democrats	Conservative	Labour
Last election	28 seats, 31.3%	12 seats, 25.8%	11 seats, 15.3%
	Fourth party	Fifth party	Sixth party
Leader	Paul Hillard	Chris Rigby
Party	CI	Green	Independent
Last election	8 seats, 7.7%	5 seats, 8.5%	5 seats, 4.5%
	Seventh party	Eighth party
Leader	Mark Howell	Judes Butt
Party	Poole People	Poole Engage
Last election	5 seats, 3.0%	2 seats, 3.5%
Leader before election
Millie Earl
Liberal Democrats
No overall control
Leader after election
TBD

The 2027 Bournemouth, Christchurch and Poole Council election will be held on 6 May 2027 to elect all 76 members of Bournemouth, Christchurch and Poole Council in Dorset, England. This will be on the same day as other local elections held across the United Kingdom.

== Background ==
Bournemouth, Christchurch and Poole Council was created in 2018 as part of structural changes to local government, which saw the abolition of the unitary authorities of Bournemouth and Poole and the non-metropolitan district of Christchurch.The first elections to the newly amalgamated council were held in 2019. In the 2023 election, the council stayed under no overall control but the Liberal Democrats overtook the Conservatives as the largest party. The Liberal Democrats, Christchurch Independents, Poole People Party and The Bournemouth Independent Group subsequently formed a coalition administration known as the "Three Towns Alliance."

In the 2024 United Kingdom general election, the Labour Party won Poole, Bournemouth West and Bournemouth East for the first time. Liberal Democrat Vikki Slade was elected MP for Mid Dorset and North Poole and subsequently resigned as council leader. In 2025, Gillian Martin and Michelle Dower resigned from the Labour Party. In October 2025, the two conservative Kinson councillors Duane Farr and Cameron Adams joined Reform UK. In May 2026, Kate and Joe Salmon, who represent Moordown ward resigned from the Green Party of England and Wales to sit as independents.

In May 2026, inaugural town council elections were held in Broadstone, Bournemouth and Poole. Bournemouth and Poole were won by Reform UK. Broadstone was won by the Liberal Democrats.

Due to proposed structural changes to local government in England, the potential Heart of Wessex Combined Authority would contain Bournemouth, Christchurch and Poole.

== Wards ==
Ward	Councillors
Alderney and Bourne Valley	3
Bearwood and Merley	3
Boscombe East and Pokesdown	2
Boscombe West	2
Bournemouth Central	2
Broadstone	2
Burton and Grange	2
Canford Cliffs	2
Canford Heath	3
Christchurch Town	2
Commons	2
Creekmoor	2
East Cliff and Springbourne	3
East Southbourne and Tuckton	2
Hamworthy	3
Highcliffe and Walkford	2
Kinson	3
Littledown and Iford	2
Moordown	2
Mudeford, Stanpit and West Highcliffe	2
Muscliff and Strouden Park	3
Newtown and Heatherlands	3
Oakdale	2
Parkstone	2
Penn Hill	2
Poole Town	3
Queen's Park	2
Redhill and Northbourne	2
Talbot and Branksome Woods	3
Wallisdown and Winton West	2
Westbourne and West Cliff	2
West Southbourne	2
Winton East	2

== See also ==
- Bournemouth, Christchurch and Poole Council elections
