= Bournemouth, Christchurch and Poole Council elections =

Local government elections in Dorset, England

Bournemouth, Christchurch and Poole Council is a unitary authority in Dorset, England. It was formed in April 2019, with the inaugural elections held in May of that year. The council is made up of 76 councillors from 33 wards, elected for a four-year term, with the next elections due to take place in 2027.

== Result maps ==
Results of the 2019 election

Results of the 2023 election

== Election results ==
Composition of the council
Year	Conservative	Liberal Democrats	Labour	Green	Poole People	CI	Poole Engage	Independents & Others	Council control after election
Council established from the merger of Bournemouth, Christchurch and Poole (76 seats)
2019	36	15	3	2	7	–	–	13 (Note: Including 1 ALL, 1 UKIP)	No overall control
2023	12	28	11	5	5	8	2	5	No overall control

== Council elections ==
- 2019 Bournemouth, Christchurch and Poole Council election
- 2023 Bournemouth, Christchurch and Poole Council election
- 2027 Bournemouth, Christchurch and Poole Council election

== By-election results ==
=== 2021 ===
Two by-elections were held in May 2021 alongside national local elections after the death of a Liberal Democrat and an independent councillor in the wards of Canford Heath and Commons.

==== Canford Heath ====
Canford Heath

Canford Heath (1 seat of 3)
Party	Candidate	Votes	%	±%
Conservative	Sean Gabriel	1,406	40.50	
Liberal Democrats	Jennie Hodges	1,365	39.32	
Labour	Janet Elizabeth Green	335	9.65	
Independent	John Sheldon	132	3.80	
Green	Ben Pantling	128	3.68	
UKIP	Vicky Spence	105	3.02	
Majority		35	0.82	
Turnout			31.96	
Conservative gain from Liberal Democrats		Swing		

==== Commons ====
Commons

Commons (1 seat of 2)
Party	Candidate	Votes	%	±%
CI	Vanessa Helen Ricketts	1,310	44.67	
Conservative	Lisle Carol Smith	822	28.03	
Independent	Fred Neale	296	10.09	
Liberal Democrats	Carol Ann Gardiner	242	8.25	
Labour	Peter Stokes	214	7.29	
UKIP	Peter James Bailey	48	1.6	
Majority		488	16.64	
Total votes		2,932		
CI hold		Swing		

=== 2022 ===
A by-election was held on 6 October 2022 following the death of independent Councillor Nick Geary.

==== Highcliffe and Walkford ====
Highcliffe and Walkford

Highcliffe and Walkford (1 seat of 2)
Party	Candidate	Votes	%	±%
CI	Andy Martin	1,778	61.95	
Liberal Democrats	Pete Brown	571	19.89	
Conservative	Christopher van Hagen	358	8.98	
Labour	David Stokes	358	5.85	
Majority		1,207	42.06	
Total votes		2,875		
CI gain from Independent		Swing		

=== 2023 ===
A by-election was held on 29 June 2023 following the resignation of Labour Councillor Martin Bedford.

==== East Cliff and Springbourne ====
East Cliff and Springbourne

East Cliff and Springbourne (1 seat of 3)
Party	Candidate	Votes	%	±%
Green	Sara Louise Armstrong	817	38.37	
Conservative	David Anthony Kelsey	614	28.84	
Labour	Declan George Stones	590	27.71	
Liberal Democrats	Paul Radcliffe	108	5.07	
Majority		203	9.53	
Turnout		2,129	18.68	
Green gain from Labour		Swing		

=== 2024 ===
==== Canford Cliffs ====
A by-election was held on 2 May 2024 alongside nationwide local elections following the resignation of Conservative Councillor May Haines.

Canford Cliffs

Canford Cliffs (1 seat of 3)
Party	Candidate	Votes	%	±%
Conservative	Gavin Wright	1,720	62.0	
Liberal Democrats	Ray Sparrow	573	20.7	
Labour	Jim Buchanan	317	11.4	
Green	Johnny Tutton	163	5.9	
Majority		1,147	41.3	
Turnout		2,773	35.4	
Rejected ballots		31		
Conservative hold		Swing		

==== Muscliff and Strouden Park ====
A by-election was held on 24 October 2024 following the death of independent Councillor Brian Castle.

Muscliff and Strouden Park

Muscliff and Strouden Park (1 seat of 3)
Party	Candidate	Votes	%	±%
Conservative	Toby Slade	1,008	43.4	
Labour	Eyyup Kilinc	434	18.7	
Independent	Julie-Anne Houldey	406	17.5	
Liberal Democrats	Richard Blackwell Whitehead	174	7.5	
Independent	Peter Rogers	118	5.1	
Independent	Conor O'Luby	100	4.3	
Green	Roger Mann	84	3.6	
Majority		574	26.7	
Turnout		2,150		
Conservative gain from Independent		Swing		

=== 2025 ===
==== Talbot and Branksome Woods ====
A by-election was held on 11 September 2025 following the resignation of Conservative Councillor Philip Broadhead.

Talbot and Branksome Woods

Talbot and Branksome Woods (1 seat of 3)
Party	Candidate	Votes	%	±%
Liberal Democrats	Dawn Logan Whitehead	910	32.4	
Reform	Martin Houlden	791	28.2	
Conservative	Jo Keeling	770	27.4	
Labour	Charlie Cushway	170	6.1	
Green	Amy Hardy	165	5.9	
Majority		119	4.2	
Turnout		2,806		
Liberal Democrats gain from Conservative		Swing		

=== 2026 ===
==== Penn Hill ====
A by-election was held on 5 November 2026 following the resignation of Liberal Democrats Councillor Jo Clements.

Penn Hill

Penn Hill (1 seat of 2)
Party	Candidate	Votes	%	±%
Liberal Democrats	Amanda Jellicoe Whitehead	1,278	43.6	+0.9
Conservative	Ashley Fraser	764	26.1	+1.0
Reform	Xena Dion	521	17.8	
Labour	Ralph Lynch	135	4.6	−6.7
Restore	Max Walker	106	3.6	+3.6
Green	Ace Cruz	65	2.2	−6.5
Independent	Susan Stockwell	55	1.9	+1.9
Independent	Louise Fielden	7	0.2	+0.2
Majority		514	17.5	
Turnout		2,931		
Liberal Democrats hold		Swing		
