= Walkford =

Electoral division in Christchurch, England

Coordinates: 50.7488°N 1.6908°W

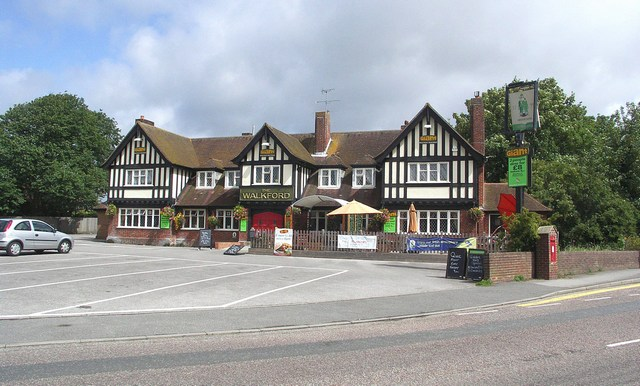
- The Walkford Pub in Walkford

- Location within Dorset
- OS grid reference: SZ219944
- Civil parish: Highcliffe and Walkford
- Unitary authority: Bournemouth, Christchurch and Poole
- Ceremonial county: Dorset
- Region: South West
- Country: England
- Sovereign state: United Kingdom
- Post town: CHRISTCHURCH
- Postcode district: BH23
- Dialling code: 01425
- Police: Dorset
- Fire: Dorset and Wiltshire
- Ambulance: South Western
- UK Parliament: Christchurch

Walkford is a suburb of Christchurch, in the electoral ward of Highcliffe and Walkford, in the unitary authority of Bournemouth, Christchurch and Poole, in the ceremonial county of Dorset, England. The suburb historically was in Hampshire.

== History ==
The name "Walkeforde" is first recorded in the 15th century in connection with Milton parish to the east. The name likely referred to a crossing over the Chewton stream, (now known as the Walkford Brook). A settlement called Walkford is first noted in the late 19th century, and much of the Walkford area was developed in the early-to-mid 20th century.

== Politics ==
Walkford shares a parish council and a BCP Council ward with Highcliffe. Walkford is part of the Christchurch parliamentary constituency for elections to the House of Commons. It is currently represented by Conservative MP Christopher Chope.

== Culture ==
Walkford was used as a filming location for One Foot in the Grave.
