= Fairmile, Dorset =

Coordinates: 50°45′0″N 1°47′42″W

Fairmile
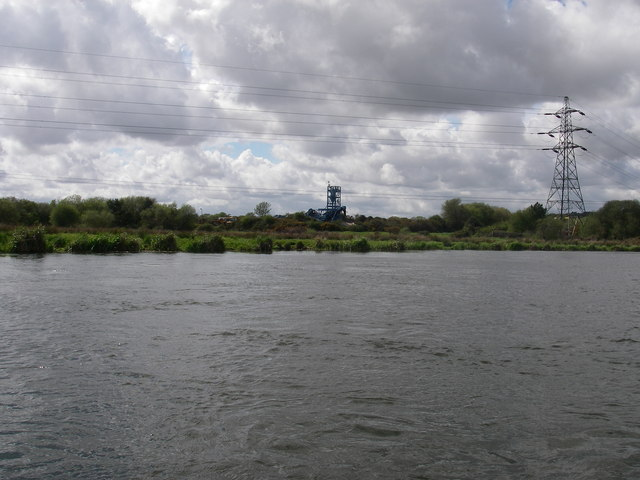
- River Avon at Fairmile

- Location within Dorset
- Unitary authority: Bournemouth, Christchurch and Poole
- Ceremonial county: Dorset
- Region: South West
- Country: England
- Sovereign state: United Kingdom
- Post town: BOURNEMOUTH
- Postcode district: BH
- Police: Dorset
- Fire: Dorset and Wiltshire
- Ambulance: South Western
- UK Parliament: Christchurch

Fairmile is a suburb of Christchurch, Dorset (historically Hampshire).

== History ==
Where the suburb stands today, Bosley was a settlement named in the Domesday Book in 1086, in the Edgegate Hundered.

== Services ==
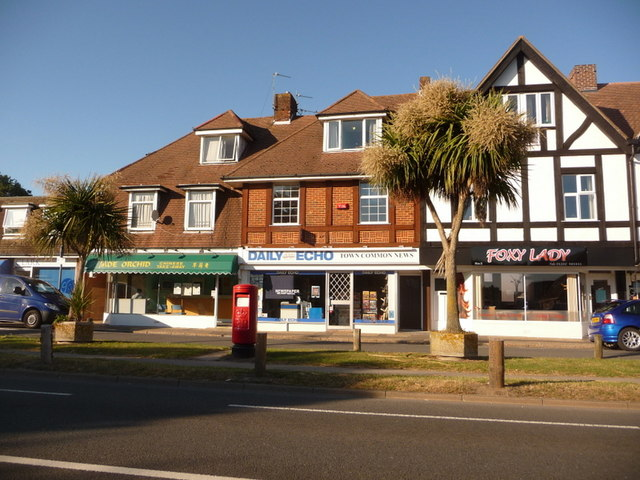
Shops at St. Catherine's Parade on Fairmile Road.

Fairmile is where Christchurch Hospital is based. The area is also served by the Fairmile House NHS hospital.

== Politics ==
Fairmile is part of the Christchurch parliamentary constituency for elections to the House of Commons. It is currently represented by Conservative MP Christopher Chope.

For elections to Bournemouth, Christchurch and Poole Council, Fairmile is part of the Commons ward.
