= Christchurch Independents =

- Abbreviation: CI
- Leader: Paul Hilliard
- Chairman: Andy Martin
- Founded: 2019; 7 years ago
- Registered: 8 February 2021
- Merger of: Former Conservative and independent councillors
- Headquarters: Christchurch, Dorset
- BCP council seats: 8 / 76

Website
- christchurchindependents.co.uk

The Christchurch Independents (CI) are a political party and group in the Bournemouth, Christchurch and Poole (BCP) Council, formed by journalist Andy Martin and (former) Conservative and Independent Councillors after the reorganisation of local government in Dorset, with new candidates joining to stand in Christchurch wards for the inaugural 2019 Bournemouth, Christchurch and Poole Council Election. Originally not forming a registered political party, CI was initially the joint-third largest alongside the Poole People and ALL group. In 2020, Christchurch Independents councillor Colin Bungey died, leading to a by-election being held the next year in the Commons Ward, for which the Christchurch Independents were registered as a political party. In 2019, the party elected Paul Hilliard to become its official leader to represent the party in the BCP Council in leader meetings.

== History ==
=== Background ===
Location of the former Christchurch borough (dark red) within Bournemouth, Christchurch and Poole (red) and Dorset

In 2018 Christchurch Borough Council unsuccessfully attempted to appeal against the planned reorganisation of Dorset into two unitary authorities, which would see Christchurch cease to be a borough as part of Dorset County Council, and instead become part of the new unitary Bournemouth, Christchurch and Poole authority, albeit with a town council remaining for Christchurch itself and several other parish councils in the former authority. In March 2018, independent Christchurch Councillor Colin Bungey wrote an email to Conservative Councillors in the borough, urging them resign from the party in response to government support for the merger.

At the first meeting of the BCP Shadow Authority, comprising all councillors of the districts of Bournemouth, Christchurch and Poole alongside the county councillors for Christchurch, Christchurch Council Leader David Flagg declared a conflict of interest due to Christchurch Council's legal challenge to the merger and that they would not be able to attend meetings until the legal challenge was resolved, before walking out alongside several Conservative and independent Christchurch Councillors, though with several remaining, including former council leader Ray Nottage. Colin Bungey reiterated his call in October of that year, arguing that Christchurch Councillors would be "under the control of the Bournemouth whip", with Christchurch having 10 councillors compared to Bournemouth and Poole having 66.

Subsequently, five Conservative Councillors in Christchurch, alongside two existing independent councillors, announced their plan to stand as independents. In March 2019, councillors David Flagg, Paul Hilliard, Nick Geary, David Jones, Lesley Dedman and Margaret Phipps were suspended from the Conservative party, alongside the deputy president of the Christchurch Conservative association, Simon McCormack. Six of the Councillors (not including David Jones) alongside McCormack announced their intention to stand as independents, with new candidates joining the existing councillors. Ultimately ten candidates stood for the BCP council election as part of the Christchurch Independents group, also calling for taxes across the new district to be equal.

=== 2019 Election and Unity Alliance ===
Results of the 2019 election. Christchurch Independents are represented alongside other independents, numbering 11 in total. Other parties included the Conservatives (36), Liberal Democrats (15) Poole People (7), Labour (3), Green Party (2), ALL (1) and UKIP (1)

Under the new ward arrangements, there were five two-member wards in the former Christchurch Borough; the Christchurch Independents ultimately stood two candidates in each. The Christchurch Independent candidates won eight out of ten seats, with the Liberal Democrats and Conservatives winning one seat each in the Christchurch Town Ward, with the CI candidates coming fifth and sixth after two more Liberal Democrat and Conservative candidates. The 2019 election as a whole resulted in the council coming under no overall control, with no single party holding a majority. Whilst the Conservatives won the largest number of seats, 36, this was three short of the 39 required for a majority. The Liberal Democrats were the second largest party, and Independent Councillors (11 total) as a whole and the Christchurch Independents by themselves constituted the third largest group on the council, with the Christchurch Independents and Poole People and ALL groups both on 8 members.

The elected councillors met after the election, with Councillor Margaret Phillips elected as the group leader with Councillor David Flagg as Deputy, with the group stating that they would be open to working with any groups in the Council other than the Conservatives, having pledged to oppose the Conservatives prior to the election; ultimately a "Unity Alliance" administration was formed by all parties other than the Conservatives and UKIP, with the Liberal Democrats leader Vikki Slade becoming leader of the council and Christchurch Independent David Flagg becoming Chair.

Elections were also held for the new Highcliffe & Walkford Neighbourhood Council and Christchurch Town Council, with uncontested appointments made for the Burton and Winkton and Hurn Parish Councils.

=== Opposition ===
BCP Council composition after the election of Drew Mellor as leader

In September 2019, Councillor Nigel Brooks left the group to sit as a "wholly independent" councillor, and in April 2020 Councillor Colin Bungey died, leaving the group with 6 councillors. Due to these developments, alongside the departure of two Poole People councillors from both their party and one from the Unity Alliance (meaning that the Poole People and ALL group was still joint-third largest group alongside CI), a vote of no confidence in Vikki Slade was held in June 2020, which resulted in a tie of 37 votes each way alongside one abstention, with Council Chairman Cllr David Flagg casting the deciding vote against the motion, meaning that the Unity Alliance continued. However, subsequently a Liberal Democrat councillor died, and the remaining former-Poole People councillor also left the alliance, leaving it with a minority; a second vote of no confidence was held in September, which passed and thus removed Vikki Slade as leader.

A meeting of the council was scheduled for October 1 in order to elect a new leader of the council; Conservative leader on the council Drew Mellor was nominated by his deputy Phill Broadhead, stating that the council "needed a reset", whilst Christchurch Independent Lesley Dedman nominated Vikki Slade. with Conservative Group Leader Drew Mellor subsequently elected leader of the Council, forming a new minority administration. In a secret ballot, Mellor received 40 votes for leader, whilst Slade received 33 votes, with a single abstention, with Mellor duly elected leader of the council; Mellor appealed to the Christchurch Independents to join the administration with potential offers of cabinet position, but the offer was rejected, with a statement reading "We stood on a platform in the elections last year that the Tories cannot be trusted to protect Christchurch and we won eight of the ten seats". The statement also reiterated the group's plans to contest the eventual by-election for Colin Bungey's Commons ward seat, with Vanessa Ricketts as the prospective candidate.

The Christchurch Independents were registered as a political party in February 2021, standing Vanessa Rickets as the Christchurch Independents candidate in the Commons Ward, where she won 44.67% of the vote and was duly elected councillor.

The party's founder Andy Martin was elected to the council on 6 October 2022, in a by-election in Highcliffe and Walkford.

=== 2023 Election and Three Towns Alliance ===
BCP Council composition after the 2024 election

In the 2023 the Christchurch Independents again stood a full slate of ten candidates, holding eight seats, with the Liberal Democrats gaining and holding the final two Christchurch Seats. The Conservatives lost their majority in the election, and subsequent to the election, the Christchurch Independents joined the Liberal Democrat-lead 'Three Towns Alliance', alongside the Poole People Party and The Bournemouth Independent Group.

In the 2024 General Election, Christchurch Independents Councillor Simon McCormack stood in the Christchurch constituency, albeit not with the party label and instead as an independent. He came sixth out of nine candidates, with 1,728 votes, 3.7% of the total.

== Councillors ==
=== Currently sitting councillors ===
Name	Ward
Lesley Dedman	Mudeford, Standpit & West Highcliffe
Paul Hilliard	Mudeford, Standpit & West Highcliffe
David Flagg	Burton & Grange
Simon McCormack	Burton & Grange
Andy Martin and David Martin	Highcliffe & Walkford
Margaret Phipps	Commons
Vanessa Ricketts	Commons

=== Former Councillors ===
Name	Ward	Notes
Nigel Brooks	Highcliffe & Walkford	Resigned to become "wholly independent" councillor in September 2019
Colin Bungey	Commons	Died April 2020, with by-election taking place in May 2021
Nick Geary	Highcliffe & Walkford	Died July 2022, with by-election taking place in October 2022

=== Parishes ===
Several Christchurch Independents were also elected to parishes in the Christchurch area as independents: Janet Abbott, one of the former-Christchurch Conservatives to leave the party, was elected to the Grange Ward of Christchurch Town Council, alongside Simon McCormack. Lesley Dedman and Paul Hilliard were elected to the Friars Cliff Ward of the Town Council. Colin Bungey was elected to the Jumpers & St Catherine's Ward, but died in April 2020. The (unsuccessful) CI Candidate for the BCP Christchurch Town Ward, Fred Neale, was also elected to the Jumpers & St Catherine's Ward of Christchurch Town Council.

Nigel Brooks was also elected to Highcliffe and Walkford Parish Council, but left the group in September 2019.

== Electoral results ==
Ward map of the results of the 2019 Bournemouth, Christchurch and Poole Council election. Christchurch seats are in the North East

All below results tally the votes of the highest polling candidate for each party within each ward. This is known as the top candidate method and is often used for multi-member plurality elections. Christchurch Independents are counted as separately from other independents for the purpose of the 2019 Results

Year	Votes	Vote share		Seats	Council Control
Year	Votes	Whole Council	Christchurch Seats	Seats	Council Control
2019	7,106	6.26%	44.27%	8 / 76	No overall control
2023	15,231	7.7%		8 / 76	No overall control

=== 2019 election ===
Ward	Candidate		Votes		Position		%
Burton and Grange	David Flagg	Simon McCormack	1,196	1,053	1st	2nd	49.48
Christchurch Town	Fred Neale	Lindy Stuart-Clark	668	625	5th	6th	21.24
Commons	Colin Bungey	Margaret Phipps	1,623	1,567	1st	2nd	50.54
Highcliffe and Walkford	Nigel Brooks	Nick Geary	1,792	1,617	1st	2nd	48.96
Mudeford, Stanpit and West Highcliffe	Lesley Dedman	Paul Hilliard	1,827	1,722	1st	2nd	50.52

=== By-election ===
2021 Commons by-election
Party	Candidate	Votes	%	±%
Christchurch Independents	Vanessa Helen Ricketts	1,310	44.67	
Conservative	Lisle Carol Smith	822	28.03	
Independent	Fred Neale	296	10.09	
Liberal Democrats	Carol Ann Gardiner	242	8.25	
Labour	Peter Stokes	214	7.29	
UKIP	Peter James Bailey	48	1.6	
Majority				
Total votes				

2022 Highcliffe and Walkford by-election
Party	Candidate	Votes	%	±%
Christchurch Independents	Andy Martin	1,778	61.95	
Liberal Democrats	Pete Brown	571	19.89	
Conservative	Christopher Seymour Nigel Van Hagen	358	8.98	
Labour	David Stokes	358	5.85	
Majority		1,207	42.06	
Total votes		2,875		

== See also ==
- BCP Independent Group
