= West Southbourne (ward) =

Electoral ward in Bournemouth, Dorset, England

Boundary of West Southbourne in Bournemouth, Christchurch and Poole.

West Southbourne is a ward in Bournemouth, Dorset. Since 2019, the ward has elected 2 councillors to the Bournemouth, Christchurch and Poole Council.

== History ==
The ward formerly elected councillors to Bournemouth Borough Council before it was abolished in 2019.

== Geography ==
The ward covers the western areas of Southbourne. The ward is between Boscombe East and Pokesdown and East Southbourne and Tuckton.

== Councillors ==
Cllr Brian Chick and Cllr Jeff Hanna, both Liberal Democrat, both elected in May 2023. Contact details on BCP Council website. Residents' surgeries held at Immanuel Church, monthly, as advertised on Facebook.

== Elections ==
=== 2023 ===
West Southbourne
Party	Candidate	Votes	%	±%
Liberal Democrats	Brian Chick	1,250	44.1	+17.6
Liberal Democrats	Jeff Hanna	1,209	42.6	+16.4
Labour	Simon Patrick Adorian	964	34.0	+6.6
Labour	Joanne Oldale	913	32.2	+5.7
Conservative	Bob Lawton‡	461	16.2	−10.8
Conservative	Ray Hatchard	458	16.1	−9.7
Green	Susan Graham	246	8.7	N/A
Majority				
Turnout		2,837	37.94	
Liberal Democrats gain from Labour		Swing		
Liberal Democrats gain from Conservative		Swing		

=== 2019 ===
West Soutbourne (2 seats)
Party	Candidate	Votes	%	±%
Labour	Lisa Lewis	718	27.4	
Conservative	Bob Lawton	708	27.0	
Labour	Corrie Drew	695	26.5	
Liberal Democrats	Gary Mitchell	695	26.5	
Liberal Democrats	Henry Castledine	685	26.2	
Conservative	Blair Crawford	675	25.8	
Independent	Chris Mayne	636	24.3	
Majority				
Turnout		2,619	33.27	
Labour win (new seat)				
Conservative win (new seat)				
