= Friars Cliff =

Area of Christchurch, Dorset, England

Coordinates: 50°43′55″N 1°43′48″W

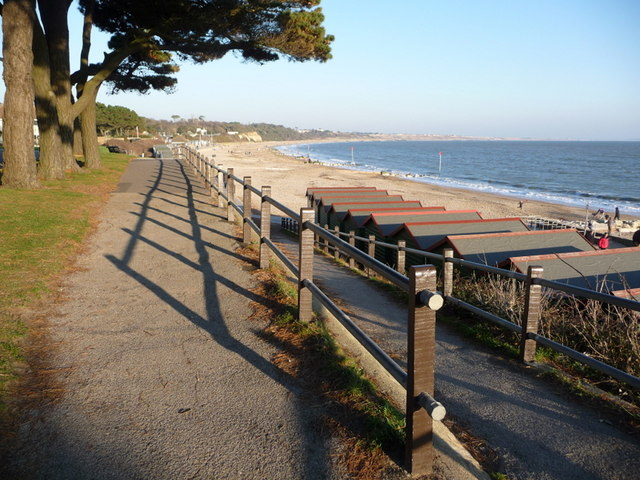
The ramp to Friars Cliff beach.

Friars Cliff is a neighborhood and beach in Christchurch, Dorset. It is east of Mudeford and west of Highcliffe.

== History ==
The area was once an isolated rural hamlet called Bure. A place called "Beora" is recorded early in the 12th century as being granted to Christchurch Priory. An estate map of 1796 depicts the hamlet of Bure as comprising two clusters of houses on either bank of Bure Brook and facing on to a village green. In the 19th century, the land to the west was enclosed for the creation of a country house and its associated grounds known as Bure Homage, whereas to the east lay Bure Farm. The settlement of Friars Cliff was developed from fields in the first half of the 20th century.

== Beach ==
Friars Cliff Beach is in the south of Christchurch, and sits on the edge of the English Channel.

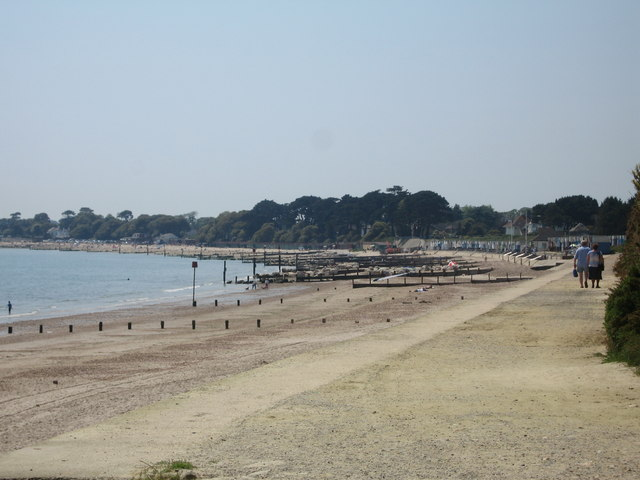
The groynes at Friars Cliff.

== Politics ==
Friars Cliff is part of the Christchurch parliamentary constituency for elections to the House of Commons. It is currently represented by Conservative MP Christopher Chope.

Friars Cliff is also part of the Mudeford, Stanpit and West Highcliffe wards for elections to Bournemouth, Christchurch and Poole Council.

Since 2019, Friars Cliff has elected two councillors to Christchurch Town Council.
