= Poole Magistrates' Court =

Court in Poole, Dorset, England

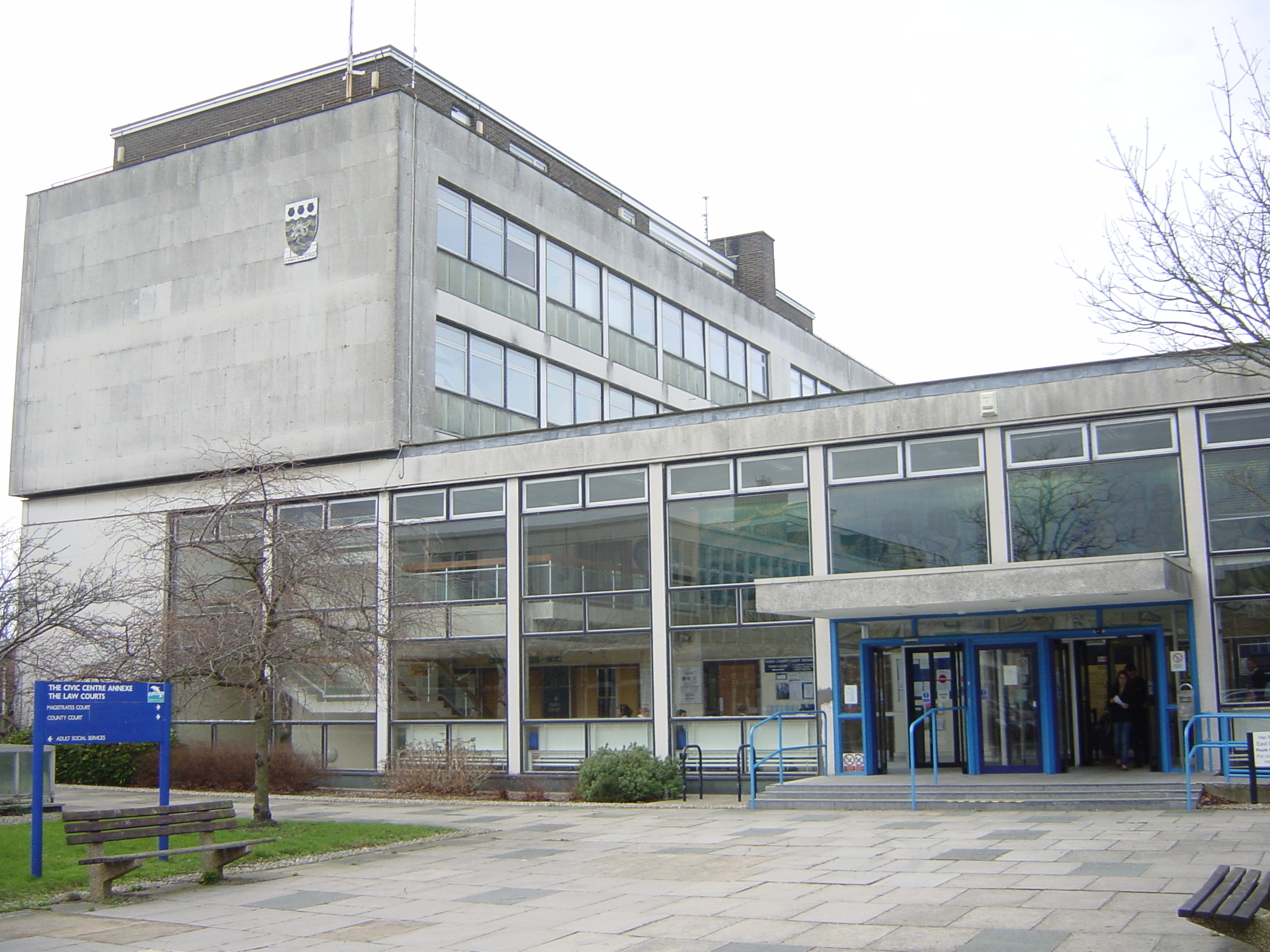
- Magistrates' Courts
- Interactive map of the Poole Magistrates' Court area

General information
- Location: Poole, Dorset, England
- Coordinates: 50.7221°N 1.9608°W
- Client: His Majesty's Courts Service

Poole Magistrates' Court is a magistrates' court in Poole, Dorset.

On 30 January 2017, Poole Magistrates' Court re-opened and became the only Magistrates' Court in the Bournemouth, Christchurch and Poole area, at the closure of Bournemouth Magistrates' Court on 27 January 2017. It was decided to re-open Poole Magistrates' Court instead of making improvements to Bournemouth's court, an 100-year-old building with an annual running cost of £382,000, despite only operating at 52% capacity.
