= Winton East =

Election ward in Bournemouth, Dorset, England

Boundary of Winton East in Bournemouth, Christchurch and Poole.

Winton East is a ward in Bournemouth, Dorset. Since 2019, the ward has elected 2 councillors to Bournemouth, Christchurch and Poole Council.

== History ==
The ward formerly elected councillors to Bournemouth Borough Council before it was abolished in 2019.

== Geography ==
The Winton East ward is in Bournemouth, centred on the eastern areas of Winton and the western areas of Charminster.

== Councillors ==
Two Green councillors.

== Election results ==
=== 2023 ===
Winton East
| Party | Candidate | Votes | % | ±% |
|---|---|---|---|---|
| Green | Simon Richard George Bull ‡ | 1,183 | 66.7 | +3.1 |
| Green | Chris Rigby ‡ | 1,116 | 62.9 | +7.9 |
| Conservative | Terry Ali | 278 | 15.7 | −5.8 |
| Labour | Austin McCormack | 262 | 14.8 | −0.7 |
| Conservative | Sash Jolliffe | 246 | 13.9 | −4.6 |
| Labour | Mike Ramsdale | 241 | 13.6 | −1.5 |
| Liberal Democrats | Paul Robert Dredge | 100 | 5.6 | N/A |
| Rejected ballots | | 16 | 0.9 | |
| Majority | | | | |
| Turnout | | 1,774 | 24.74 | |
| Green hold | | Swing | | |
| Green hold | | Swing | | |

=== 2019 ===
Winton East (2 seats)
| Party | Candidate | Votes | % | ±% |
|---|---|---|---|---|
| Green | Simon Bull | 1,385 | 63.6 | |
| Green | Chris Rigby | 1,198 | 55.0 | |
| Conservative | Patrick Oakley | 468 | 21.5 | |
| Conservative | Cameron Adams | 403 | 18.5 | |
| Labour | Cecilia Penn | 338 | 15.5 | |
| Labour | John Kingston | 328 | 15.1 | |
| Majority | | | | |
| Turnout | | 2,177 | | |
| Green win (new seat) | | | | |
| Green win (new seat) | | | | |
