= Parkstone (ward) =

UK electoral ward

Boundary of Parkstone in Bournemouth, Christchurch and Poole.

Parkstone is an electoral ward in Poole, Dorset. Since 2019, the ward has elected 2 councillors to Bournemouth, Christchurch and Poole Council.

== History ==
The ward formerly elected three councillors to Poole Borough Council.

== Geography ==
The ward covers the suburb of the same name.

== Councillors ==
Election	Councillors		
2011	Sally Carpenter (Conservative)	Ann Stribley (Conservative)	Tony Woodcock (Conservative)
2015	John Challinor (Conservative)	Ann Stribley (Conservative)	Emma Williams (Conservative)
2019	Stephen Baron (Poole People Party) (Poole Local Group: 2022)	Ann Stribley (Conservative)	Two Seats
2023	Crispin Goodall (Liberal Democrats)	Emily Harman (Liberal Democrats)	Two Seats

== Election results ==
=== 2023 ===
Parkstone
Party	Candidate	Votes	%	±%
Liberal Democrats	Crispin James Goodall	1,284	44.1	+23.5
Liberal Democrats	Emily Carrie Harman	1,269	43.6	+29.4
Conservative	Bryan Dion (Note: Incumbent councillor for Penn Hill)	652	22.4	−9.1
Conservative	Ashley Fraser	628	21.6	−5.7
Poole People	Susan Jane Stockwell	349	12.0	−31.5
Poole People	Matilda Marie Northover	337	11.6	N/A
Labour	Darren James Taylor	332	11.4	−2.2
Green	Ben Pantling	287	9.9	−6.4
Poole Engage	Steve Baron‡ (Note: Elected as Poole People, formed Poole Engage in June 2022)	278	9.6	−33.9
Poole Engage	Elaine Joan Atkinson	250	8.6	N/A
Majority				
Turnout		2,910	34.53	
Liberal Democrats gain from Poole People		Swing		
Liberal Democrats gain from Conservative		Swing		

=== 2019 ===
2019 Bournemouth, Christchurch and Poole Council election: Parkstone (2 seats)
Party	Candidate	Votes	%	±%
Poole People	Stephen Baron	1,300	43.5	
Conservative	Ann Stribley	942	31.5	
Conservative	John Challinor	815	27.3	
Liberal Democrats	Crispin Goodall	615	20.6	
Independent	Michael Hancock	609	20.4	
Green	Keith Lawson	486	16.3	
Liberal Democrats	Grant Gillingham	425	14.2	
Labour	Jo Aylward-Carter	406	13.6	
Majority				
Turnout		2,987	36.79	
Poole People win (new seat)				
Conservative win (new seat)				
