= Moordown (ward) =

Electoral ward in Dorset, England

Boundary of Moordown in Bournemouth, Christchurch and Poole.

Moordown is a ward in Bournemouth, Dorset. Since 2019, the ward has elected 2 councillors to Bournemouth, Christchurch and Poole Council.

== History ==
The ward formerly elected councillors to Bournemouth Borough Council before it was abolished in 2019.

== Geography ==
Moordown ward covers the suburbs of Moordown and Charminster.

== Election results ==
=== 2023 ===
Moordown
Party	Candidate	Votes	%	±%
Green	Alice Kate Salmon	1,089	47.3	+21.1
Green	Joe Angus Salmon	904	39.3	+16.3
Conservative	Sarah Catherine Anderson‡	637	27.7	−12.3
Conservative	Beverley Ann Dunlop‡	582	25.3	−2.9
Labour	Mary Apperley	528	22.9	+3.5
Labour	David Llewellyn Kelsey Stokes	447	19.4	+1.9
Liberal Democrats	Andrew David Hallam	204	8.9	N/A
Majority				
Turnout		2,303	31.71	
Green gain from Conservative		Swing		
Green gain from Conservative		Swing		

=== 2019 ===
Moordown (2 seats)
Party	Candidate	Votes	%	±%
Conservative	Sarah Anderson	867		
Conservative	Beverley Dunlop	612		
Green	Alice Bisson	569		
Green	Joe Salmon	499		
Labour	Nigel Apperley	420		
UKIP	Mike Clark	378		
Labour	David Griffiths	376		
UKIP	Sylvi Clark	331		
Majority				
Turnout				
Conservative win (new seat)				
Conservative win (new seat)				
