= Highcliffe =

Town in Dorset, England

Coordinates: 50.7414°N 1.6959°W

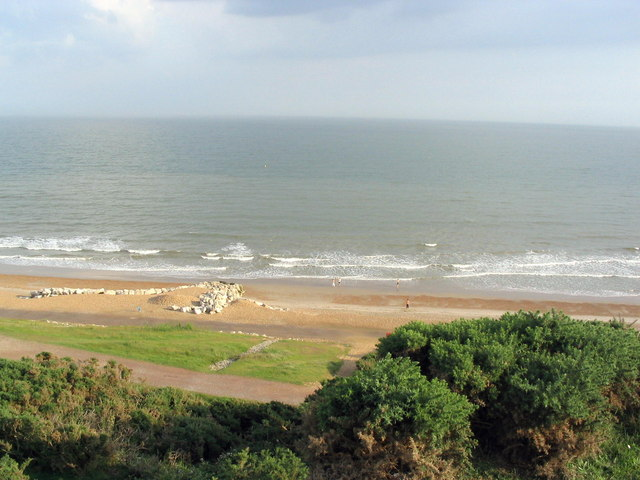
- Beach at Highcliffe

- Location within Dorset
- Population: 3,673
- OS grid reference: SZ214936
- Civil parish: Highcliffe and Walkford
- Unitary authority: Bournemouth, Christchurch and Poole
- Ceremonial county: Dorset
- Region: South West
- Country: England
- Sovereign state: United Kingdom
- Post town: CHRISTCHURCH
- Postcode district: BH23
- Dialling code: 01425
- Police: Dorset
- Fire: Dorset and Wiltshire
- Ambulance: South Western
- UK Parliament: Christchurch

Highcliffe or Highcliffe-on-Sea is a seaside town in the civil parish of Highcliffe and Walkford, in the unitary authority area of Bournemouth, Christchurch and Poole, in the ceremonial county of Dorset in England. It forms part of the South East Dorset conurbation along the English Channel coast. The town lies on a picturesque stretch of Solent coastline with views of the Isle of Wight and its 'Needles' rocks. It is part of the historic county of Hampshire. From 1974 to 2019 it was in the Christchurch district.

== Location ==
Highcliffe is situated to the east of the historic town of Christchurch and the resort town of Bournemouth, and to the west of Barton on Sea and New Milton. The New Forest National Park is to the north.

Its position on the south coast gives it a climate with milder winters than inland areas, and less rainfall than locations further west. This helped establish the town as a popular health and leisure resort during the late Victorian and early Edwardian eras.

== History ==
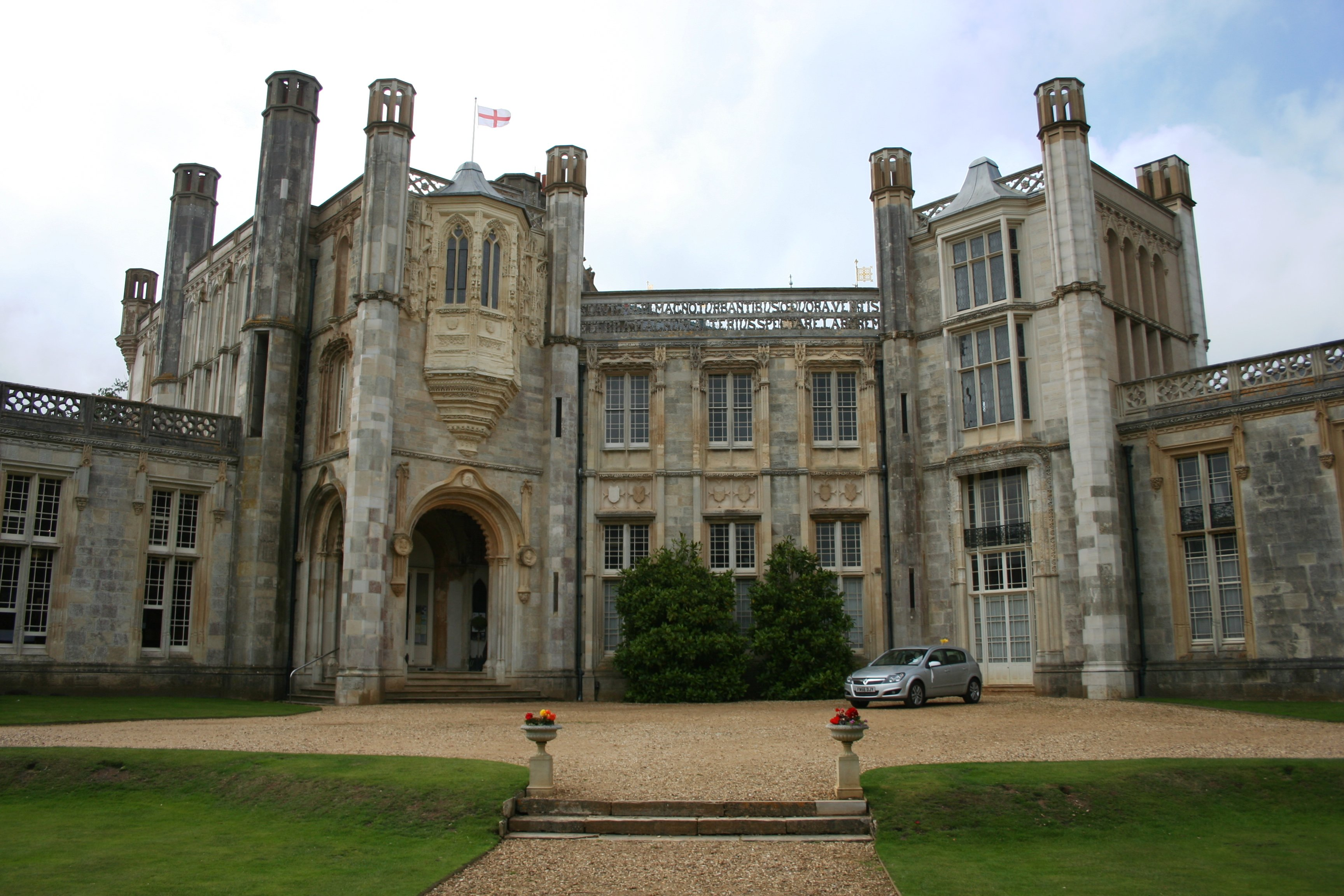
Highcliffe Castle

What is now regarded as Highcliffe has developed over the last several hundred years from the hamlet of Slop Pond, the Chewton Estate, and Chewton Common. The latter two also contained large farmsteads.

Slop Pond was a collection of thatched cottages, named from the large pond on its common. The cottages were said to be occupied by farm workers and fishermen, who engaged in the smuggling and poaching trade now notorious in local history.

When the area became a more popular tourist destination in the Victorian era, Slop Pond was renamed Newtown. This was changed to Highcliff after the first house built on the high cliff, soon to become known as Highcliffe-on-Sea.

Between 1831 and 1835, Lord Stuart de Rothesay built Highcliffe Castle, a Gothic Revival home, near the site of High Cliff House, his father's Georgian estate. The design, by William Donthorne, a founder member of RIBA, incorporated large quantities of carved Medieval stonework salvaged from the Norman Benedictine Abbey of St Peter at Jumièges in northwest France and the Grande Maison des Andelys. At the beginning of the 20th century the reputation of Highcliffe was so considerable that in 1907 Kaiser Wilhelm II chose to stay at Highcliffe Castle when recuperating from the strain of political scandals in Germany.

Highcliffe Castle is now a Grade I listed building described as "the most important remaining example of the Romantic and Picturesque style of architecture", and now holds events throughout the year open to the general public. It is also a popular venue for weddings and other private events. Harry Gordon Selfridge, founder of Selfridges & Co, rented the castle between 1916 and 1922. He is buried in a simple grave at St Marks Churchyard next to his wife and mother. The castle featured in Mr Selfridge, a TV series charting the life of the department store magnate.

Between 1911 and 1914 Greystones house was built in the village to a design by Edward Schroeder Prior.

The area also has a literary connection and was once a centre for Wicca with Gerald Gardner living in Highcliffe. Captain Frederick Marryat, author of The Children of The New Forest, was a visitor to the house on the Chewton estate (now the Chewton Glen Hotel, Spa and Country Club).

== Modern times ==
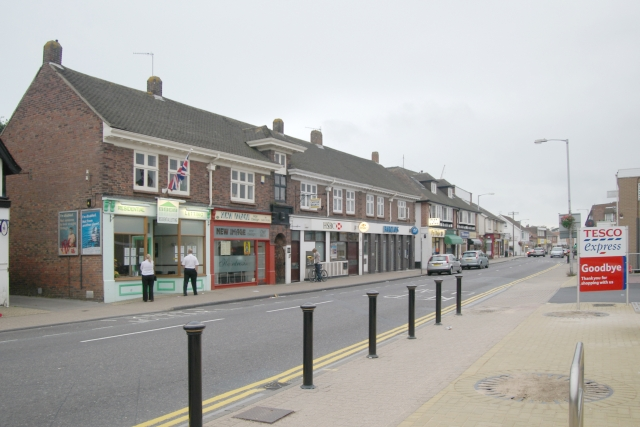
Highcliffe town centre in 2006

Educational establishments in the town include Highcliffe St Mark Primary School and Highcliffe School. There are also independent preparatory and secondary schools local to the area in New Milton and Barton on Sea.

The Maritime and Coastguard Agency's national training centre was formerly located at Steamer Point.

Highcliffe Food and Arts Festival has taken place annually in June since 2014. It is run on a not-for-profit basis, and showcases local food, drinks and arts. It began as an offshoot of the nearby Christchurch Food Festival.

== Politics ==
Highcliffe is part of the Christchurch parliamentary constituency for elections to the House of Commons. It is currently represented by Conservative MP Christopher Chope. Highcliffe is also part of the Highcliffe and Walkford and Mudeford, Stanpit and West Highcliffe wards for elections to Bournemouth, Christchurch and Poole Council.

Highcliffe was formerly a chapelry in the parish of Christchurch, on 1 October 1897 Highcliffe became a separate civil parish, on 1 April 1932 the parish was abolished and merged with Christchurch. In 1931 the parish had a population of 1738.
