= Mudeford, Stanpit and West Highcliffe =

Electoral ward in Dorset, England

Boundary of Mudeford, Stanpit and West Highcliffe in Bournemouth, Christchurch and Poole.

Mudeford, Stanpit and West Highcliffe is a ward in Christchurch, Dorset. Since 2019, the ward has elected 2 councillors to Bournemouth, Christchurch and Poole Council.

== Geography ==
The ward covers the areas of Mudeford, Stanpit, Friars Cliff and the western parts of Highcliffe-on-Sea.

== Election results ==
=== 2023 ===
Mudeford, Stanpit and West Highcliffe
Party	Candidate	Votes	%	±%
CI	Lesley Margaret Dedman‡	2,004	62.4	+11.9
CI	Paul Alan Hilliard‡	1,784	55.5	+7.9
Conservative	Claire Stephanie Bath	923	28.7	−3.6
Liberal Democrats	Sam Davies	320	10.0	−0.4
Liberal Democrats	Erin Samantha Tarling	305	9.5	+0.3
Green	Adie Saunders	294	9.2	N/A
Labour	Ian Wands	245	7.6	+0.9
Majority				
Turnout		3,213	39.30	
CI hold		Swing		
CI hold		Swing		

=== 2019 ===
Mudeford, Stanpit and West Highcliffe (2 seats)
Party	Candidate	Votes	%	±%
Independent	Lesley Dedman	1,827	50.5	
Independent	Paul Hilliard	1,722	47.6	
Conservative	Claire Bath	1,168	32.3	
Conservative	Ray Nottage	873	24.1	
Liberal Democrats	Fiona Cox	377	10.4	
Liberal Democrats	Keith Harrison	333	9.2	
Labour	Gillian Hope	244	6.7	
Labour	William Deans	241	6.7	
Majority				
Turnout		3,618	44.95	
Independent win (new seat)				
Independent win (new seat)				
