= Westbourne and West Cliff =

Ward on the Dorset coast, UK

Boundary of Westbourne and West Cliff in Bournemouth, Christchurch and Poole.

Westbourne and West Cliff is a ward in Bournemouth, Dorset. Since 2019, the ward has elected 2 councillors to Bournemouth, Christchurch and Poole Council.

== History ==
In 2018, a local councillor said the ward was becoming ghettoized.

The ward formerly elected councillors to Bournemouth Borough Council before it was abolished in 2019.

== Geography ==
The Westbourne and West Cliff ward is in the south west of Bournemouth, bordering Canford Cliffs in neighbouring Poole. The ward covers the affluent suburbs of Westbourne and West Cliff, just outside Bournemouth Town Centre.

== Councillors ==
Two Conservative councillors.

== Election results ==
=== 2023 ===
Westbourne and West Cliff
Party	Candidate	Votes	%	±%
Conservative	John William Beesley ‡	974	41.3	−6.8
Conservative	David D’Orton Gibson	887	37.6	−9.0
Liberal Democrats	Russell Paul Trent	718	30.4	+7.5
Liberal Democrats	Allan Turner Ward	625	26.5	+10.1
Labour	Jill Grower	472	20.0	+4.2
Green	Liz Elwick	448	19.0	−2.2
Labour	Daniel Moore	351	14.9	+4.0
Rejected ballots		18		
Majority				
Turnout		2,359	28.72	
Conservative hold		Swing		
Conservative hold		Swing		

=== 2019 ===
Westbourne and West Cliff (2 seats)
Party	Candidate	Votes	%	±%
Conservative	John Beesley	1,236	48.1	
Conservative	Nicola Greene	1,195	46.6	
Liberal Democrats	Laura Young	588	22.9	
Green	Liz Elwick	543	21.2	
Liberal Democrats	Phoebe Castledine	420	16.4	
Labour	Patrick Canavan	406	15.8	
Labour	Stephen Sinsbury	281	10.9	
Majority				
Turnout		2,567		
Conservative win (new seat)				
Conservative win (new seat)				
