= Newtown and Heatherlands =

Electoral ward in Poole, Dorset, England

Boundary of Newtown and Heatherlands in Bournemouth, Christchurch and Poole.

Newtown and Heatherlands is an electoral ward in Poole, Dorset. Since 2019, the ward has elected 3 councillors to Bournemouth, Christchurch and Poole Council.

== Geography ==
The ward covers the suburbs of Newtown, Rossmore and Heatherlands.

== Councillors ==
At the 2019 Bournemouth, Christchurch and Poole Council election, Newton and Heatherlands elected three Liberal Democrat councillors.

Election	Councillors		
2019	Millie Earl (Liberal Democrats)	Marlon Le Poidevin (Liberal Democrats)	Mark Robson (Liberal Democrats)
2023	Millie Earl (Liberal Democrats)	Marlon Le Poidevin (Liberal Democrats)	Sandra Mackrow (Liberal Democrats)

== Election results ==
=== 2023 ===
Newtown and Heatherlands
Party	Candidate	Votes	%	±%
Liberal Democrats	Millie Clementine Earl‡	1,966	62.5	+16.8
Liberal Democrats	Marion Le Poidevin‡	1,717	54.6	+12.7
Liberal Democrats	Sandra Mackrow	1,609	51.1	+15.6
Labour	Emma Lang	706	22.4	+4.3
Conservative	Malcolm Farrell	695	22.1	±0.0
Green	Bruce Tomalin	636	20.2	−1.2
Conservative	Sylvia Alexandra Saxon	600	19.1	+0.3
Conservative	Louise Sarah Russell	561	17.8	+1.5
Majority				
Turnout		3,147	24.15	
Liberal Democrats hold		Swing		
Liberal Democrats hold		Swing		
Liberal Democrats hold		Swing		

=== 2019 ===
2019 Bournemouth, Christchurch and Poole Council election: Newtown and Heatherlands (3 seats)
Party	Candidate	Votes	%	±%
Liberal Democrats	Millie Earl	1,785	45.7	
Liberal Democrats	Marlon Le Poidevin	1,637	41.9	
Liberal Democrats	Mark Robson	1,388	35.6	
Conservative	Malcolm Farrelll	862	22.1	
Green	Adrian Oliver	835	21.4	
Conservative	Craig Allison	733	18.8	
Labour	Emma Lang	707	18.1	
UKIP	Vicky Spence	657	16.8	
Labour	Alan Daniels	645	16.5	
Conservative	Thomas Lindsey	638	16.3	
Engage	Marty Caine	356	9.1	
Majority				
Turnout		3,904	29.91	
Liberal Democrats win (new seat)				
Liberal Democrats win (new seat)				
Liberal Democrats win (new seat)				
