= Boscombe East and Pokesdown =

Electoral ward in Bournemouth, Dorset, England

- ward Bournemouth, Christchurch and Poole Council
- Boundary of Boscombe East and Pokesdown in Bournemouth, Christchurch and Poole.
- Major settlements: Pokesdown; Boscombe

Current ward
- Created: 2019
- Councillor: George Farquhar (Labour)
- Councillor: Eleanor Connolly (Labour)
- Created from: Boscombe East

2003–2019
- Number of councillors: 3
- UK Parliament constituency: Bournemouth East

Boscombe East and Pokesdown is a ward in Bournemouth, Dorset. Since 2019, the ward has elected 2 councillors to Bournemouth, Christchurch and Poole Council.

== History ==
The ward covers most of the area of the former ward of Boscombe East, which elected three councillors to Bournemouth Borough Council.

== Geography ==
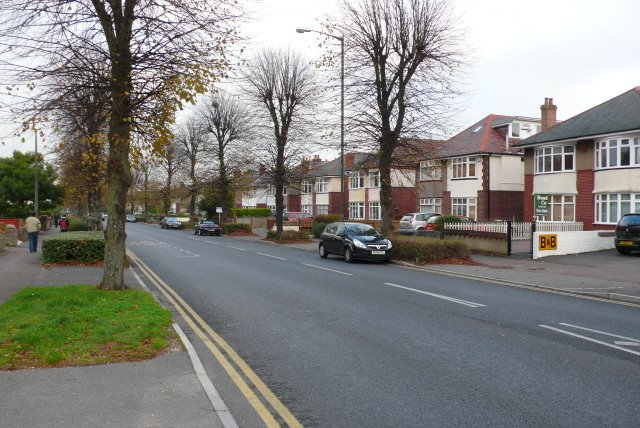
Christchurch Road, Pokesdown.

The ward includes the suburb of Pokesdown, and the eastern areas of Boscombe. It is part of the parliamentary constituency of Bournemouth East.

== Councillors ==
Election	Councillors		
2003	Michael Everingham (Liberal Democrats)	Andrew Garratt (Liberal Democrats)	Christopher Mayne (Liberal Democrats)
2007	Christopher Rochester (Conservative)	Mike Everingham (Conservative)	Linda Bailey (Conservative)
2011	Christopher Rochester (Conservative)	John Wilson (Conservative)	Linda Bailey (Conservative)
2015	Christopher Rochester (Conservative)	Andy Jones (Conservative)	Gina Pacifico-Mackin (Conservative)
Bournemouth, Christchurch and Poole
2019	George Farquhar (Labour)	Andy Jones (Conservative)	Seat Abolished
2023	George Farquhar (Labour)	Eleanor Connolly (Labour)	Seat Abolished

== Election results ==
=== 2023 ===
Boscombe East and Pokesdown (2 seats)
Party	Candidate	Votes	%	±%
Labour	George Farquhar‡	1,465	58.4	+28.1
Labour	Eleanor Connolly	1,232	49.1	+27.5
Independent	Andy Jones‡ (Note: Elected as Conservative)	429	17.1	−12.3
Conservative	Mariam Kazem-Malaki	398	15.9	−13.5
Green	Mike Squires	332	13.2	−13.4
Conservative	Gayatri Balakrishna Lokhande	326	13.0	−8.2
Liberal Democrats	Rebecca Sian Edwards	307	12.2	−6.1
Liberal Democrats	James Robert Lees	187	7.5	−6.6
Majority				
Turnout		2,507	31.90	
Labour hold		Swing		
Labour gain from Conservative		Swing		

=== 2019 ===
Boscombe East and Pokesdown (2 seats)
Party	Candidate	Votes	%	±%
Labour	George Farquhar	747	30.3	
Conservative	Andy Jones	724	29.4	
Green	Susan Chapman	656	26.6	
Labour	Sam King	533	21.6	
Conservative	Gina Mackin	522	21.2	
Liberal Democrats	Rebecca Edwards	450	18.3	
UKIP	Ron Dickinson	392	15.9	
Liberal Democrats	Philip Dunn	346	14.1	
Majority				
Turnout		2,462	30.86%	
Labour win (new seat)				
Conservative win (new seat)				
