= Commons (ward) =

Electoral ward in Dorset, England

- ward Bournemouth, Christchurch and Poole Council
- Boundary of Commons in Bournemouth, Christchurch and Poole.
- Major settlements: Jumpers Common, Hurn, East Parley and Parley Common

Current ward
- Created: 2019
- Councillor: Margaret Phipps (Independent)
- Councillor: Vanessa Ricketts (Independent)
- Created from: St Catherine's and Hum; Jumpers
- UK Parliament constituency: Christchurch

Commons is a ward of Christchurch, Dorset. Since 2019, the ward has elected 2 councillors to Bournemouth, Christchurch and Poole Council.

== History ==
The ward comprises the former Christchurch Borough Council wards of St Catherine's & Hum and Jumpers now defunct Jumpers ward formerly elected 2 councillors to Christchurch Borough Council.

== Geography ==
The ward covers the Jumpers Common and Fairmile areas of Christchurch. The southern border of the ward follows the River Stour. Other rural parts of the ward include; Hurn, East Parley and Parley Common. The ward is the largest in the council. Commons ward includes Bournemouth Airport.

== Councillors ==
=== Commons ===
Election	Councillors	
2019	Colin Bungey (Independent)	Margaret Phipps (Independent)
2021 by-election	Vanessa Ricketts (Christchurch Independents)	Margaret Phipps (Independent)
2023	Vanessa Ricketts (Christchurch Independents)	Margaret Phipps (Christchurch Independents)

=== Former Wards ===
==== St Catherine's and Hurn Ward ====
Election	Councillors	
2003	David Fox (Conservative)	Susan Spittle (Conservative)
2007	David Fox (Conservative)	Susan Spittle (Conservative)
2011	Tavis Fox (Conservative)	Susan Spittle (Conservative)
2015	Margaret Phipps (Conservative)	Susan Spittle (Conservative)

==== Jumpers ====
Election	Councillors	
2003	Colin Bungey (Independent)	Robert McArthur (Independent)
2005 by-election	Colin Bungey (Independent)	Robert McArthur (Independent)
2007	Colin Bungey (Independent)	Robert McArthur (Independent)
2011	Colin Bungey (Independent)	Robert McArthur (Independent)
2015	Colin Bungey (Independent)	Robert McArthur (Independent)

== Election results ==
=== 2023 ===
Commons
Party	Candidate	Votes	%	±%
CI	Margaret Phipps‡	1,757	59.5	+9.4
CI	Vanessa Helen Ricketts‡ (Note: Elected in a by-election in May 2021)	1,574	53.3	+1.4
Conservative	Tara Jane Fox	414	14.0	±0.0
Liberal Democrats	Mark Stuart Davies	380	12.9	−1.8
Independent	Robin Thomas Adamson	355	12.0	N/A
Green	Carol Ann Gardiner	310	10.5	N/A
Labour	Peter Stokes	294	9.9	+2.8
Liberal Democrats	Cat Gold	226	7.6	−5.0
Conservative	Lynda Price	226	7.6	−5.3
Majority				
Turnout		2,955	37.13	
CI hold		Swing		
CI hold		Swing		

=== 2021 by-election ===
The seat was won by independent candidate Vanessa Helen Ricketts.

Commons (1 seat of 2)
Party	Candidate	Votes	%	±%
Christchurch Independents	Vanessa Helen Ricketts	1,310	44.67	
Conservative	Lisle Carol Smith	822	28.03	
Independent	Fred Neale	296	10.09	
Liberal Democrats	Carol Ann Gardiner	242	8.25	
Labour	Peter Stokes	214	7.29	
UKIP	Peter James Bailey	48	1.6	
Majority				
Total votes				

=== 2019 ===
2019 Bournemouth, Christchurch and Poole Council election: Commons (2 seats)
Party	Candidate	Votes	%	±%
Independent	Colin Bungey	1,623	51.9	
Independent	Margaret Phipps	1,567	50.1	
No party description	Jim Biggin	469	15.0	
Liberal Democrats	Carol Gardiner	458	14.7	
Conservative	Victoria Hallam	438	14.0	
Conservative	Lisle Smith	403	12.9	
Liberal Democrats	Fenella Vick	394	12.6	
Labour	Peter Stokes	223	7.1	
Labour	Antoinette Pearce	208	6.7	
Majority				
Turnout		3,125	40.53%	
Independent win (new seat)				
Independent win (new seat)				

=== 2015 ===
2015 Christchurch Borough Council election: Jumpers (2 seats)
Party	Candidate	Votes	%	±%
Independent	Colin Bungey	1,014		
Independent	Fred Neale	982		
Conservative	Norma Fox	678		
Conservative	Will Edwards	652		
Labour	Robin Thorpe	270		
Green	Robert Staite	214		
Labour	Howard Wortley	211		
Green	Nigel Ware	174		
Turnout		4,195	70.5	+24.2
Independent hold		Swing		
Independent hold		Swing		
