= Talbot and Branksome Woods =

Electoral ward in Dorset, England

Boundary of Talbot and Branksome Woods in Bournemouth, Christchurch and Poole.

Talbot and Branksome Woods is a ward in Dorset. Since 2019, the ward has elected 3 councillors to Bournemouth, Christchurch and Poole Council.

== History ==
In April 2025, councillor Karen Rampton resigned from the Conservative Party. Philip Broadhead resigned in July 2025.

== Geography ==
The ward crosses the boundary of Bournemouth and Poole and covers the suburbs of Talbot Woods, Branksome Woods and Meyrick Park, and parts of Talbot Village and Charminster. The Talbot Campus of the Bournemouth University is also in the ward.

== Councillors ==
Election	Councillors		
2019	Karen Rampton (Conservative/Independent)	Philip Broadhead (Conservative)	Drew Mellor (Conservative)
2023	Karen Rampton (Conservative/Independent)	Philip Broadhead (Conservative)	Matt Gillett (Liberal Democrats)
2025	Karen Rampton (Conservative/Independent)	Dawn Logan (Liberal Democrats)	Matt Gillett (Liberal Democrats)

== Elections ==
Incumbent councillors are denoted with a double dagger mark (‡).

=== 2025 ===
11 September 2025, a by-election was held following the resignation of Philip Broadhead.

Talbot and Branksome Woods by-election: 11 September 2025
Party	Candidate	Votes	%	±%
Liberal Democrats	Dawn Logan	910	32.4	–2.1
Reform UK	Martin Houlden	791	28.2	N/A
Conservative	Jo Keeling	770	27.4	–5.0
Labour	Charlie Cushway	170	6.1	–5.7
Green	Amy Hardy	165	5.9	–6.6
Majority		119	4.2	N/A
Turnout		2,808	28.4	–0.9
Registered electors		9,900		
Liberal Democrats gain from Conservative				

=== 2023 ===
Talbot and Branksome Woods: 2023 election
Party	Candidate	Votes	%	±%
Liberal Democrats	Matthew Stephen Gillett	1,143	39.1	+21.7
Conservative	Karen Alexis Rampton‡	1,073	36.7	−6.7
Conservative	Philip Alan Broadhead‡	1,068	36.6	−8.1
Liberal Democrats	Mark Battistini	1,063	36.4	+18.8
Conservative	Jane Newell	1,024	35.1	−9.4
Liberal Democrats	Daniel Parkin	985	33.7	+16.7
Green	Ian Charles Cunliffe	413	14.1	−6.6
Labour	Paul Forsdick	391	13.4	−0.6
Labour	Elaine Yiannaki	372	12.7	−1.0
Labour	Stephen Stones	313	10.7	−2.9
Heritage	Jim Burch	181	6.2	N/A
No Description	Charlotte Robinson	112	3.8	N/A
Majority				
Turnout		2,920	29.34	
Liberal Democrats gain from Conservative		Swing		
Conservative hold		Swing		
Conservative hold		Swing		

=== 2019 ===
Talbot and Branksome Woods (3 seats): 2019 election
Party	Candidate	Votes	%	±%
Conservative	Philip Broadhead	1,439	44.7	
Conservative	Drew Mellor	1,433	44.5	
Conservative	Karen Rampton	1,399	43.4	
Independent	Lynda B-Price	719	22.3	
Green	Yasmine Osbourne	666	20.7	
Liberal Democrats	Jana Sadeh	567	17.6	
Liberal Democrats	Matthew Gillett	561	17.4	
Liberal Democrats	David England	548	17.0	
Labour	Jago Corry	450	14.0	
Labour	Ruth Messer	440	13.7	
Labour	Patrick Connolly	437	13.6	
Majority				
Turnout		3,221	31.50	
Conservative win (new seat)				
Conservative win (new seat)				
Conservative win (new seat)				
