= Highcliffe and Walkford =

Civil parish in Christchurch, Dorset, England

Boundary of Highcliffe and Walkford in Bournemouth, Christchurch and Poole.

Highcliffe and Walkford is a civil parish and electoral ward in Christchurch, Dorset. Since 2019, the ward has elected 2 councillors to Bournemouth, Christchurch and Poole Council.

== History ==
The ward has a parish council of the same name. On 8 July 2022, councillor and former mayor of Christchurch Nick Geary died.

== Geography ==
The ward is in the far east of the council area, and covers the areas of Highcliffe and Walkford.

== Councillors ==
The ward is currently represented by two independent councillors.

Election	Councillors	
2019	Nigel Brooks (Christchurch Independents)	Nigel Geary (Independent)
2019	Nigel Brooks (Independent)	Nigel Geary (Independent)
2022	Nigel Brooks (Independent)	Andy Martin (Christchurch Independents)
2023	David Martin (Christchurch Independents)	Andy Martin (Christchurch Independents)

== Election results ==
=== 2023 ===
2023 Bournemouth, Christchurch and Poole Council election: Highcliffe and Walkford
Party	Candidate	Votes	%	±%
CI	Andy Martin‡ (Note: Elected in a by-election in October 2022)	2,810	73.8	+25.7
CI	David Francis Martin	2,450	64.3	+20.9
Conservative	Mike Ellis	354	9.3	−22.7
Independent	Nigel David Brooks‡	324	8.5	−39.6
Liberal Democrats	Robin Alan Beresford Ede	317	8.3	−1.9
Labour	Lorraine Brown	260	6.8	−1.2
Green	Helen Frances Woodall	220	5.8	N/A
Conservative	Efe Ohwofasa	208	5.5	−21.8
Reform	Vince Cable	189	5.0	N/A
Liberal Democrats	Keith Harrison	168	4.4	−5.0
Communist	Carol Ann Wilcox	40	1.0	N/A
Majority				
Turnout		3,810	44.05	
CI hold		Swing		
CI hold		Swing		

=== 2022 by-election ===
The by-election triggered by the death of councillor Nick Geary was held on 6 October 2022. Voter turnout was 33.22%.

Highcliffe and Walkford (1 seat of 2)
Party	Candidate	Votes	%	±%
CI	Andy Martin	1,778	61.95	
Liberal Democrats	Pete Brown	571	19.89	
Conservative	Christopher Seymour Nigel Van Hagen	358	8.98	
Labour	David Stokes	358	5.85	
Majority		1,207	42.06	
Total votes		2,875		

=== 2019 ===
2019 Council election: Highcliffe and Walkford (2 seats)
Party	Candidate	Votes	%	±%
Independent	Nigel Brooks	1,792	48.1	
Independent	Nick Geary	1,617	43.4	
Conservative	Trish Jamieson	1,192	32.0	
Conservative	Colin Jamieson	1,017	27.3	
Liberal Democrats	Lily Cox	379	10.2	
Liberal Democrats	Lucy Harris	351	9.4	
Labour	Kathryn Boniface	297	8.0	
Labour	Roger Boniface	266	7.1	
Majority				
Turnout		3,728	44.22	
Independent win (new seat)				
Independent win (new seat)				
