= 2019 Bournemouth, Christchurch and Poole Council election =

2019 local election in Bournemouth, Christchurch and Poole

- 2 May 2019

All 76 seats to Bournemouth, Christchurch and Poole Council 39 seats needed for a majority

	First party	Second party	Third party
Party	Conservative	Liberal Democrats	Independent
Seats won	36	15	11
Popular vote	67,504	46,999	29,781
Percentage	32.2%	22.4%	14.2%
	Fourth party	Fifth party	Sixth party
Party	Poole People	Labour	Green
Seats won	7	3	2
Popular vote	11,243	29,719	15,653
Percentage	5.4%	14.2%	7.5%
- Winner of each seat at the 2019 Bournemouth, Christchurch and Poole Council election
Council control after election
No overall control

The 2019 Bournemouth, Christchurch and Poole Council election took place on 2 May 2019 to elect the inaugural members of Bournemouth, Christchurch and Poole Council in England, formed from the former unitary authorities of Bournemouth and Poole, and borough of Christchurch. At the same time an election for the new Christchurch Town Council was held.

A shadow authority comprising elected members of the three preceding councils and relevant members of Dorset County Council sat prior to the election. Elections for the two parish councils in the area were also held.

== Background ==
Bournemouth, Christchurch and Poole Council held elections on 2 May 2019 along with councils across England as part of the 2019 local elections. The council elected all of its councillors for the first time under the auspices of the combined council. The merger of Bournemouth Borough Council, Christchurch Borough Council and Poole Borough Council's councils to form this new council was reported to save £500,000 per year. A shadow authority of councillors for the three preceding councils and relevant members of Dorset County Council sat as a shadow authority prior to the election, with the Conservative group controlling the council and a majority of councillors being members of the Conservative Party. Parish councils in the area also held elections, such as the newly formed Christchurch town council, replacing the former Borough Council, and the Highcliffe and Walkford Neighbourhood Council. Whilst the shadow authority had 125 members, the redrawn ward boundaries meant that the newly elected body has 76 members.

Representatives from all of the main UK political parties, the Conservatives, the Liberal Democrats, Labour, Green Party of England and Wales and UKIP, stood for election to the new council. Alongside the national parties, several localist groups also stood for election, such as the Poole People, Alliance for Local Living and the Engage parties, as well as the informal Christchurch Independents group.

Poole People is a localist group which had previously stood in and won seats in the former Poole borough. For the 2019 election, they stood eight candidates in wards corresponding to Poole, winning seven seats in total. The Alliance for Local Living also stood parties, after being set up in 2018, and cooperating with Poole People; ALL intended to stand four candidates in total, but due to the timing of the official registration of the party, only two were able to be listed on the ballot paper; all four candidates also stood in Poole seats, but with only one win.

In March 2019, seven Conservative candidates, including the leader of the council David Flagg, were suspended from the party following their opposition to the merger. Five of the suspended councillors (David Flagg, Margaret Phipps, Lesley Dedman, Nick Geary and Janet Abbott) alongside two existing independents (Colin Bungey and Fred Neale) stood as 'Christchurch Independents', in opposition to the Conservatives, with those holding seats forming a group in the council after the election.

== Overall results ==
The composition of the shadow authority immediately ahead of this election was:

↓
102	7	6	3	1	1
Conservative	Independent	Lib Dems	Poole People	Green	UKIP

Following the election, the composition of the council was:

↓
36	15	11	7	3	2	1	1
Conservative	Lib Dems	Independent	Poole People	Labour	Green	UKIP	ALL

== Summary ==
=== Election result ===
2019 Bournemouth, Christchurch and Poole Council election
Party	Candidates	Seats	Gains	Losses	Net gain/loss	Seats %	Votes %	Votes	+/−
Conservative	76	36	N/A	N/A	N/A	47.4	32.2	67,504	N/A
Liberal Democrats	67	15	N/A	N/A	N/A	19.7	22.4	46,999	N/A
Independent	32	11	N/A	N/A	N/A	14.5	14.2	29,781	N/A
Poole People	8	7	N/A	N/A	N/A	9.2	5.4	11,243	N/A
Labour	70	3	N/A	N/A	N/A	3.9	14.2	29,719	N/A
Green	28	2	N/A	N/A	N/A	2.6	7.5	15,653	N/A
UKIP	14	1	N/A	N/A	N/A	1.3	3.3	6,838	N/A
ALL	2	1	N/A	N/A	N/A	1.3	0.7	1,566	N/A
Engage Party	2	0	N/A	N/A	N/A	0.0	0.3	580	N/A

== Aftermath ==
Council composition after the election

The election resulted in no overall control, with no party winning the thirty-nine seats required for an overall majority; whilst the Conservatives were the largest party on the council, they lacked a majority. The Conservatives held seats in Bournemouth, with other parties and independents performing well in both Christchurch and Poole. The newly formed Christchurch Independents group, who were the third largest group with seven seats, said that they would be open to working with all parties except the Conservatives, who had led the creation of the new authority. Conservative councillor John Beesley said that the Conservatives should run the council, and that he was prepared to run a minority administration if no other party would support him. The Liberal Democrats also announced their intention to form a coalition with other parties on the council. Subsequently, Liberal Democrat Vikki Slade was elected council leader of a "Unity Alliance" of all the parties except the Conservatives and UKIP, with 39 members in total.

Within the council, six party groups were formed:

	Group	Councillors	Composition
Opposition	Conservative	36 / 76	Conservative Party
Administration	Liberal Democrats	15 / 76	Liberal Democrats
Administration	Christchurch Independents	8 / 76	Independents
Administration	Poole People and ALL	8 / 76	Poole People, Alliance for Local Living
Administration	Bournemouth Independent & Greens	4 / 76	Green Party, Independents
Administration	Labour	3 / 76	Labour Party
Administration	Unaligned	1 / 76	Independent
Opposition	Unaligned	1 / 76	UKIP

In 2022, councillors from the Conservatives and one from Poole People defected to form the Poole Local Group.

== Ward results ==
The statement of persons nominated was posted by the authority on 5 April 2019, 299 candidates were standing. Asterisks (*) denote sitting councillors seeking re-election. The results for each ward were as follows.

=== Alderney and Bourne Valley ===
Alderney and Bourne Valley (3 seats)
Party	Candidate	Votes	%	±%
Liberal Democrats	Tony Trent	1,241	36.3	
Liberal Democrats	Rachel Maidment	1,132	33.1	
Liberal Democrats	Toby Johnson	1,022	29.9	
Conservative	Benjamin Levy	821	24.0	
Poole People	Benjamin Norton	758	22.2	
Conservative	Gregory Welch	653	19.1	
Conservative	Trevor Watts	651	19.1	
UKIP	Joe Cryans	631	18.5	
Labour	Henry Land	615	18.0	
Labour	Lisa Weir	581	17.0	
Labour	David Stokes	505	14.8	
ALL	Claire Crescent	447	13.1	
Independent	Martin Smalley	303	8.9	
Majority		199		
Turnout		3,415	28.21%	
Rejected ballots		24		
Liberal Democrats win (new seat)				
Liberal Democrats win (new seat)				
Liberal Democrats win (new seat)				

=== Bearwood and Merley ===
Bearwood and Merley (3 seats)
Party	Candidate	Votes	%	±%
Liberal Democrats	David Brown	2,115	49.8	
Liberal Democrats	Marcus Andrews	1,850	43.6	
Liberal Democrats	Richard Burton	1,746	41.1	
Independent	Marion Pope	1,456	34.3	
Conservative	Jane Newell	1,168	27.5	
Conservative	Ashley Fraser	949	22.4	
Conservative	Stephen Baker	942	22.2	
Green	Simon Riggs	443	10.4	
Labour	Siobhan Bardsley	213	5.0	
Labour	Gigi Sismaet	193	4.5	
Labour	Moe Phillips	180	4.2	
Majority				
Turnout		4,246	39.70%	
Rejected ballots		32		
Liberal Democrats win (new seat)				
Liberal Democrats win (new seat)				
Liberal Democrats win (new seat)				

=== Boscombe East and Pokesdown ===
Boscombe East and Pokesdown (2 seats)
Party	Candidate	Votes	%	±%
Labour	George Farquhar	747	30.3	
Conservative	Andy Jones	724	29.4	
Green	Susan Chapman	656	26.6	
Labour	Sam King	533	21.6	
Conservative	Gina Mackin	522	21.2	
Liberal Democrats	Rebecca Edwards	450	18.3	
UKIP	Ron Dickinson	392	15.9	
Liberal Democrats	Philip Dunn	346	14.1	
Majority				
Turnout		2,462	30.86%	
Rejected ballots		12		
Labour win (new seat)				
Conservative win (new seat)				

=== Boscombe West ===
Boscombe West (2 seats)
Party	Candidate	Votes	%	±%
Conservative	Jane Kelly	666	37.1	
Labour	Lewis Allison	618	34.4	
Conservative	Philip Stanley-Watts	591	32.9	
Labour	Sara Armstrong	539	30.0	
Green	Anne Cassels	518	28.8	
Liberal Democrats	Paul Radcliffe	316	17.6	
Majority		27		
Turnout		1,796	23.47%	
Rejected ballots		36		
Conservative win (new seat)				
Labour win (new seat)				

=== Bournemouth Central ===
Bournemouth Central (2 seats)
Party	Candidate	Votes	%	±%
Conservative	Mike Greene	883	41.5	
Conservative	Hazel Allen	846	39.8	
Independent	David Smith	625	29.4	
Green	Sarah Bedford	452	21.3	
Labour	Philip Murray	349	16.4	
Labour	Charlie Nixon	289	13.6	
Liberal Democrats	Craig Norman	208	9.8	
Liberal Democrats	Kevin Williams	171	8.0	
Majority				
Turnout		2,126	25.68%	
Rejected ballots		20		
Conservative win (new seat)				
Conservative win (new seat)				

=== Broadstone ===
Broadstone (2 seats)
Party	Candidate	Votes	%	±%
Liberal Democrats	Vikki Slade	2,899	67.2	
Liberal Democrats	Mike Brooke	2,892	67.0	
Conservative	David Newell	1,035	24.0	
Conservative	Helen Lawrence	875	20.3	
UKIP	Paula Holyoak	299	6.9	
Labour	Robin Phillips	136	3.2	
Labour	Pete Stratford	118	2.7	
Majority				
Turnout		4,315	49.67%	
Rejected ballots		20		
Liberal Democrats win (new seat)				
Liberal Democrats win (new seat)				

=== Burton and Grange ===
Burton and Grange (2 seats)
Party	Candidate	Votes	%	±%
Independent	David Flagg*	1,196	51.2	
Independent	Simon McCormack	1,053	45.1	
Labour	Claire Wade	525	22.5	
Labour	Andrew Dunne	420	18.0	
Conservative	Wendy Grace	363	15.5	
Conservative	Brian Case	358	15.3	
Green	Benjamin Pantling	187	8.0	
Liberal Democrats	Robert Dawson	146	6.3	
Liberal Democrats	Frederick Worthy	125	5.4	
Majority				
Turnout		2,336	33.46%	
Rejected ballots		28		
Independent win (new seat)				
Independent win (new seat)				

=== Canford Cliffs ===
Canford Cliffs (2 seats)
Party	Candidate	Votes	%	±%
Conservative	May Haines	1,990	61.9	
Conservative	Mohan Iyengar	1,851	57.6	
Independent	Peter Pawlowski	615	19.1	
Independent	David Young	555	17.3	
Liberal Democrats	Robin Rennison	555	17.3	
Liberal Democrats	Dave Yates	372	11.6	
Labour	Martin Holst	185	5.8	
Majority				
Turnout		3,214	40.58%	
Rejected ballots		33		
Conservative win (new seat)				
Conservative win (new seat)				

=== Canford Heath ===
Canford Heath (3 seats)
Party	Candidate	Votes	%	±%
Liberal Democrats	Sandra Moore	1,966	56.3	
Liberal Democrats	Chris Matthews	1,753	50.2	
Liberal Democrats	Pete Parrish	1,541	44.2	
Conservative	Sean Gabriel	899	25.8	
Conservative	Ruth Thompson	871	25.0	
Conservative	Raymond Tindle	657	18.8	
UKIP	Christopher Spence	552	15.8	
Labour	Janet Green	397	11.4	
Green	Andrew Hawkins	335	9.6	
Labour	Rob Bassinder	250	7.2	
Labour	Trisha Hyder	238	6.8	
Majority				
Turnout		3,490	32.51%	
Rejected ballots		10		
Liberal Democrats win (new seat)				
Liberal Democrats win (new seat)				
Liberal Democrats win (new seat)				

=== Christchurch Town ===
Christchurch Town (2 seats)
Party	Candidate	Votes	%	±%
Liberal Democrats	Mike Cox	891	29.6	
Conservative	Peter Hall	851	28.2	
Liberal Democrats	Michael Tarling	850	28.2	
Conservative	Peter Watson-Lee	716	23.8	
Independent	Fred Neale	668	22.2	
Independent	Lindy Stuart-Clark	625	20.7	
Green	Steve Docherty	386	12.8	
Labour	Robert Hope	348	11.5	
Labour	David Munnik	279	9.3	
Majority		1		
Turnout		3,014	38.20%	
Rejected ballots		40		
Liberal Democrats win (new seat)				
Conservative win (new seat)				

=== Commons ===
Commons (2 seats)
Party	Candidate	Votes	%	±%
Independent	Colin Bungey	1,623	51.9	
Independent	Margaret Phipps	1,567	50.1	
No party description	Jim Biggin	469	15.0	
Liberal Democrats	Carol Gardiner	458	14.7	
Conservative	Victoria Hallam	438	14.0	
Conservative	Lisle Smith	403	12.9	
Liberal Democrats	Fenella Vick	394	12.6	
Labour	Peter Stokes	223	7.1	
Labour	Antoinette Pearce	208	6.7	
Majority				
Turnout		3,125	40.53%	
Rejected ballots		38		
Independent win (new seat)				
Independent win (new seat)				

=== Creekmoor ===
Creekmoor (2 seats)
Party	Candidate	Votes	%	±%
Conservative	Judy Butt	877	38.8	
UKIP	Diana Butler	591	26.2	
Conservative	Steve Hayes	584	25.8	
Liberal Democrats	Paul Slade	519	23.0	
Independent	Shaun Connolly	503	22.3	
Liberal Democrats	Trevor Morton	446	19.7	
Green	Wayland Goodliffe	288	12.7	
Labour	Ruby Free	211	9.3	
Majority		7		
Turnout		2,260	31.26%	
Rejected ballots		6		
Conservative win (new seat)				
UKIP win (new seat)				

=== East Cliff and Springbourne ===
East Cliff and Springbourne (3 seats)
Party	Candidate	Votes	%	±%
Conservative	Anne Filer	1,016	36.2	
Conservative	David Kelsey	971	34.6	
Conservative	Roberto Rocca	861	30.7	
Labour	Tina Thompson	715	25.5	
Labour	Ian Prankerd	691	24.6	
Labour	David Thompson	663	23.6	
Green	Frank Miles	639	22.8	
Liberal Democrats	Alfreda Christensen-Barton	488	17.4	
Liberal Democrats	Jordan Blackwell	451	16.1	
Liberal Democrats	Brian Jenner	447	15.9	
Independent	Oli Cheetham	444	15.8	
Majority				
Turnout		2,808	24.02%	
Rejected ballots		29		
Conservative win (new seat)				
Conservative win (new seat)				
Conservative win (new seat)				

=== East Southbourne and Tuckton ===
East Southbourne and Tuckton (2 seats)
Party	Candidate	Votes	%	±%
Conservative	Eddie Coope	1,659	56.5	
Conservative	Malcolm Davies	1,464	49.9	
Green	Jane Bull	658	22.4	
Liberal Democrats	Jon Nicholas	597	20.3	
Labour	Toni Colledge	356	12.1	
Liberal Democrats	David Ruffer	331	11.3	
Labour	Alan Davidson	245	8.3	
Majority				
Turnout		2,935	38.64%	
Rejected ballots		55		
Conservative win (new seat)				
Conservative win (new seat)				

=== Hamworthy ===
Hamworthy (3 seats)
Party	Candidate	Votes	%	±%
Poole People	Julie Bagwell	1,621	51.6	
Poole People	Daniel Butt	1,411	44.9	
Conservative	Mike White	773	24.6	
Conservative	Mike Wilkins	725	23.1	
UKIP	John Butler	638	20.3	
Conservative	Vishal Gupta	606	19.3	
Green	Ian Hay	460	14.6	
Labour	Sarah Ward	453	14.4	
Labour	Jim Buchanan	436	13.9	
Labour	Neil Duncan-Jordan	408	13.0	
Liberal Democrats	Peter Sidaway	224	7.1	
Liberal Democrats	David Chicken	196	6.2	
Liberal Democrats	Declan Stones	162	5.2	
Majority				
Turnout		3,144	30.43%	
Rejected ballots		11		
Poole People win (new seat)				
Poole People win (new seat)				
Conservative win (new seat)				

=== Highcliffe and Walkford ===
Highcliffe and Walkford (2 seats)
Party	Candidate	Votes	%	±%
Independent	Nigel Brooks	1,792	48.1	
Independent	Nick Geary	1,617	43.4	
Conservative	Trish Jamieson	1,192	32.0	
Conservative	Colin Jamieson	1,017	27.3	
Liberal Democrats	Lily Cox	379	10.2	
Liberal Democrats	Lucy Harris	351	9.4	
Labour	Kathryn Boniface	297	8.0	
Labour	Roger Boniface	266	7.1	
Majority				
Turnout		3,728	44.22	
Rejected ballots		64		
Independent win (new seat)				
Independent win (new seat)				

=== Kinson ===
Kinson (3 seats)
Party	Candidate	Votes	%	±%
Conservative	Duane Farr	1,086	31.7	
Conservative	Laurence Fear	1,019	29.7	
Conservative	Norman Decent	937	27.3	
Labour	Catherine Gutman Roberts	810	23.6	
Labour	Joanne Oldale	787	23.0	
Labour	Carl Richards	752	21.9	
Independent	Mark Battistini	682	19.9	
Independent	Amedeo Angiolini	665	19.4	
UKIP	Melita Jeffries	656	19.1	
Independent	John Perkins	520	15.2	
Green	Carla Gregory-May	505	14.7	
Liberal Democrats	Jack Holliss	270	7.9	
Liberal Democrats	Ann Smith	262	7.6	
Engage	Susan Lennon	224	6.5	
Majority				
Turnout		3,428	26.54	
Rejected ballots		19		
Conservative win (new seat)				
Conservative win (new seat)				
Conservative win (new seat)				

=== Littledown and Iford ===
Littledown and Iford (2 seats)
Party	Candidate	Votes	%	±%
Conservative	Lawrence Williams	1,182	48.0	
Conservative	Bobbie Dove	1,156	47.0	
Liberal Democrats	Catherine Bishop	556	22.6	
Green	David Ball	552	22.4	
Labour	Pauline Haynes	372	15.1	
Labour	Bill Brandwood	326	13.3	
Liberal Democrats	Muiruri Coyne	312	12.7	
Majority				
Turnout		2,460	32.62	
Rejected ballots		44		
Conservative win (new seat)				
Conservative win (new seat)				

=== Moordown ===
Moordown (2 seats)
Party	Candidate	Votes	%	±%
Conservative	Sarah Anderson	867	40.0	
Conservative	Beverley Dunlop	612	28.2	
Green	Alice Bisson	569	26.2	
Green	Joe Salmon	499	23.0	
Labour	Nigel Apperley	420	19.4	
UKIP	Mike Clark	378	17.4	
Labour	David Griffiths	376	17.3	
UKIP	Sylvi Clark	331	15.3	
Majority				
Turnout		2,170	29.17	
Rejected ballots		12		
Conservative win (new seat)				
Conservative win (new seat)				

=== Mudeford, Stanpit and West Highcliffe ===
Mudeford, Stanpit and West Highcliffe (2 seats)
Party	Candidate	Votes	%	±%
Independent	Lesley Dedman	1,827	50.5	
Independent	Paul Hilliard	1,722	47.6	
Conservative	Claire Bath	1,168	32.3	
Conservative	Ray Nottage	873	24.1	
Liberal Democrats	Fiona Cox	377	10.4	
Liberal Democrats	Keith Harrison	333	9.2	
Labour	Gillian Hope	244	6.7	
Labour	William Deans	241	6.7	
Majority				
Turnout		3,618	44.95	
Rejected ballots		44		
Independent win (new seat)				
Independent win (new seat)				

=== Muscliff and Strouden Park ===
Muscliff and Strouden Park (3 seats)
Party	Candidate	Votes	%	±%
Independent	Kieron Wilson	2,129	51.5	
Independent	Lisa Northover	1,581	38.3	
Conservative	Derek Borthwick	1,022	24.7	
Conservative	Ian Clark	973	23.5	
Independent	John Trickett	846	20.5	
Conservative	Michael Weinhonig	841	20.3	
Green	Peter Lucas	694	16.8	
Independent	John Adams	652	15.8	
UKIP	Fiona Dougherty	621	15.0	
Labour	Jilly Grower	531	12.8	
Labour	Paul Forsdick	427	10.3	
Labour	Steve Laughton	410	9.9	
Majority				
Turnout		4,133	32.32	
Rejected ballots		16		
Independent win (new seat)				
Independent win (new seat)				
Conservative win (new seat)				

=== Newtown and Heatherlands ===
Newtown and Heatherlands (3 seats)
Party	Candidate	Votes	%	±%
Liberal Democrats	Millie Earl	1,785	45.7	
Liberal Democrats	Marion Le Poidevin	1,637	41.9	
Liberal Democrats	Mark Robson	1,388	35.6	
Conservative	Malcolm Farrell	862	22.1	
Green	Adrian Oliver	835	21.4	
Conservative	Craig Allison	733	18.8	
Labour	Emma Lang	707	18.1	
UKIP	Vicky Spence	657	16.8	
Labour	Alan Daniels	645	16.5	
Conservative	Lindsey Thomas	638	16.3	
Engage	Marty Caine	356	9.1	
Majority				
Turnout		3,904	29.91	
Rejected ballots		22		
Liberal Democrats win (new seat)				
Liberal Democrats win (new seat)				
Liberal Democrats win (new seat)				

=== Oakdale ===
Oakdale (2 seats)
Party	Candidate	Votes	%	±%
Poole People	Peter Miles	1,406	50.8	
ALL	Felicity Rice	1,119	40.4	
Conservative	Ian Potter	701	25.3	
Conservative	Janet Walton	527	19.0	
UKIP	Janice Long	421	15.2	
Liberal Democrats	Sean Perrin	334	12.1	
Liberal Democrats	Tansy Earl	321	11.6	
Labour	Ian Aitkenhead	294	10.6	
Majority				
Turnout		2,770	32.81	
Rejected ballots		6		
Poole People win (new seat)				
ALL win (new seat)				

=== Parkstone ===
Parkstone (2 seats)
Party	Candidate	Votes	%	±%
Poole People	Stephen Baron	1,300	43.5	
Conservative	Ann Stribley	942	31.5	
Conservative	John Challinor	815	27.3	
Liberal Democrats	Crispin Goodall	615	20.6	
Independent	Michael Hancock	609	20.4	
Green	Keith Lawson	486	16.3	
Liberal Democrats	Grant Gillingham	425	14.2	
Labour	Jo Aylward-Carter	406	13.6	
Majority				
Turnout		2,987	36.79	
Rejected ballots		16		
Poole People win (new seat)				
Conservative win (new seat)				

=== Penn Hill ===
Penn Hill (2 seats)
Party	Candidate	Votes	%	±%
Conservative	Tony O'Neill	1,157	39.6	
Conservative	Bryan Dion	1,030	35.2	
Liberal Democrats	Brian Clements	1,016	34.8	
Liberal Democrats	Rich Douglas	920	31.5	
Green	Hannah Macklin	766	26.2	
Labour	Mini Kingman	455	15.6	
Majority				
Turnout		2,922	34.86	
Rejected ballots		50		
Conservative win (new seat)				
Conservative win (new seat)				

=== Poole Town ===
Poole Town (3 seats)
Party	Candidate	Votes	%	±%
Poole People	Mark Howell	1,603	47.9	
Poole People	Andy Hadley	1,593	47.6	
Poole People	L-J Evans	1,551	46.3	
Labour	Sue Aitkenhead	748	22.3	
Conservative	Andy Garner-Watts	666	19.9	
Labour	Andy Proctor	664	19.8	
Labour	Phillipa Connolly	647	19.3	
Conservative	Xena Dion	647	19.3	
Conservative	Tom Lintern-Mole	632	18.9	
Liberal Democrats	Jon Cox	328	9.8	
Liberal Democrats	Tim Joyce	253	7.6	
Liberal Democrats	Quenten Walker	211	6.3	
Independent	Simon Lane	76	2.3	
Independent	William Kimmet	71	2.1	
Majority				
Turnout		3,348	33.41%	
Rejected ballots		11		
Poole People win (new seat)				
Poole People win (new seat)				
Poole People win (new seat)				

=== Queen's Park ===
Queen's Park (2 seats)
Party	Candidate	Votes	%	±%
Conservative	Mark Anderson	1,071	45.1	
Conservative	Cheryl Johnson	921	38.8	
Green	Alasdair Keddie	474	19.9	
Labour	Sharon Carr-Brown	395	16.6	
Green	Elizabeth McManus	363	15.3	
Labour	Susan Fisher	346	14.6	
UKIP	David Hughes	299	12.6	
Liberal Democrats	Gillian Pardy	271	11.4	
Liberal Democrats	Lorraine Crouch	261	11.0	
Majority				
Turnout			30.30	
Rejected ballots		18		
Conservative win (new seat)				
Conservative win (new seat)				

=== Redhill and Northbourne ===
Redhill and Northbourne (2 seats)
Party	Candidate	Votes	%	±%
Independent	Stephen Bartlett	1,281	49.2	
Conservative	Jackie Edwards	660	25.4	
Independent	Richard Sheridan	654	25.1	
Conservative	David D'Orton-Gibson	639	24.6	
UKIP	Marilyn Day	372	14.3	
Labour	Ann Williams	292	11.2	
Green	Martine Smid-Weevers	282	10.8	
Liberal Democrats	Heather Dalziel	243	9.3	
Labour	Darren Taylor	212	8.1	
Liberal Democrats	Phillip Lucas	155	6.0	
Majority				
Turnout		2,602	34.39%	
Rejected ballots		7		
Independent win (new seat)				
Conservative win (new seat)				

=== Talbot and Branksome Woods ===
Talbot and Branksome Woods (3 seats)
Party	Candidate	Votes	%	±%
Conservative	Philip Broadhead	1,439	44.7	
Conservative	Drew Mellor	1,433	44.5	
Conservative	Karen Rampton	1,399	43.4	
Independent	Lynda B-Price	719	22.3	
Green	Yasmine Osbourne	666	20.7	
Liberal Democrats	Jana Sadeh	567	17.6	
Liberal Democrats	Matthew Gillett	561	17.4	
Liberal Democrats	David England	548	17.0	
Labour	Jago Corry	450	14.0	
Labour	Ruth Messer	440	13.7	
Labour	Patrick Connolly	437	13.6	
Majority				
Turnout		3,221	31.50	
Rejected ballots		36		
Conservative win (new seat)				
Conservative win (new seat)				
Conservative win (new seat)				

=== Wallisdown and Winton West ===
Wallisdown and Winton West (2 seats)
Party	Candidate	Votes	%	±%
Conservative	Nigel Hedges	872	42.4	
Conservative	Susan Phillips	831	40.4	
Green	Matthew Burgess	427	20.8	
Green	Chris Henderson	387	18.8	
Labour	Michael Cracknell	357	17.4	
Liberal Democrats	Ines Antunovic-Thomson	352	17.1	
Labour	Lloyd Owen	334	16.2	
Liberal Democrats	Martin Rodger	280	13.6	
Majority				
Turnout		2,056	27.87	
Rejected ballots		34		
Conservative win (new seat)				
Conservative win (new seat)				

=== West Southbourne ===
West Southbourne (2 seats)
Party	Candidate	Votes	%	±%
Labour	Lisa Lewis	716	27.3	
Conservative	Bob Lawton	708	27.0	
Labour	Corrie Drew	695	26.5	
Liberal Democrats	Gary Mitchell	695	26.5	
Liberal Democrats	Henry Castledine	685	26.2	
Conservative	Blair Crawford	675	25.8	
Independent	Chris Mayne	636	24.3	
Majority				
Turnout		2,619	33.27	
Rejected ballots		24		
Labour win (new seat)				
Conservative win (new seat)				

=== Westbourne and West Cliff ===
Westbourne and West Cliff (2 seats)
Party	Candidate	Votes	%	±%
Conservative	John Beesley	1,236	48.1	
Conservative	Nicola Greene	1,195	46.6	
Liberal Democrats	Laura Young	588	22.9	
Green	Liz Elwick	543	21.2	
Liberal Democrats	Phoebe Castledine	420	16.4	
Labour	Patrick Canavan	406	15.8	
Labour	Stephen Sinsbury	281	10.9	
Majority				
Turnout		2,567	30.83	
Rejected ballots		47		
Conservative win (new seat)				
Conservative win (new seat)				

=== Winton East ===
Winton East (2 seats)
Party	Candidate	Votes	%	±%
Green	Simon Bull	1,385	63.6	
Green	Chris Rigby	1,198	55.0	
Conservative	Patrick Oakley	468	21.5	
Conservative	Cameron Adams	403	18.5	
Labour	Cecilia Penn	338	15.5	
Labour	John Kingston	328	15.1	
Majority				
Turnout		2,177	29.97	
Rejected ballots		25		
Green win (new seat)				
Green win (new seat)				

== Changes 2019–2023 ==
- Julie Bagwell and Daniel Butt, both elected for the Poole People Party, left the party in October 2019 to sit as independents. Daniel Butt also left the Unity Alliance coalition at the same time. Julie Bagwell remained an independent within the Unity Alliance until September 2020, when she also withdrew from the coalition.
- Steve Baron, Daniel Butt, Toby Johnson (elected as a Liberal Democrat) and Nigel Brooks all joined the Conservative group in autumn 2021, giving the party a majority on the council.
- The Conservatives lost their majority on the council in June 2022 when Steve Baron, Mohan Iyengar, Daniel Butt and Judy Butt left the party to form the Poole Local Group with independent councillor Julie Bagwell. The group was subsequently registered as a political party called the Poole Engage Party.
- Jackie Edwards, elected as a Conservative, left the party on 1 October 2022 to sit as an independent.
- Andy Jones (Boscombe East), elected as a Conservative, left the Conservative group to sit as an unaligned councillor in autumn 2022.

=== By-elections ===
==== Canford Heath ====
Canford Heath: 6 May 2021
Party	Candidate	Votes	%	±%
Conservative	Sean Gabriel	1,406	40.5	+14.7
Liberal Democrats	Jennie Hodges	1,365	39.3	−4.9
Labour	Janet Green	335	9.7	−1.7
Independent	John Sheldon	132	3.8	N/A
Green	Ben Pantling	128	3.7	−5.9
UKIP	Vicky Spence	105	3.0	−12.8
Majority				
Turnout		3,495	31.96	−0.55
Rejected ballots		24	0.7	
Registered electors		10,934		
Conservative gain from Liberal Democrats		Swing		

By-election triggered by death of Liberal Democrat councillor Pete Parrish in July 2020. By-election not allowed to be held earlier due to COVID-19 pandemic.

==== Commons ====
Commons: 6 May 2021
Party	Candidate	Votes	%	±%
CI	Vanessa Ricketts	1,310	44.7	−7.2
Conservative	Lisle Smith	822	28.0	+15.1
Independent	Fred Neale	296	10.1	N/A
Liberal Democrats	Carol Gardiner	242	8.3	−6.4
Labour	Peter Stokes	214	7.3	+0.2
UKIP	Peter Bailey	48	1.6	N/A
Majority				
Turnout		2,958	36.50	−4.03
Rejected ballots		23	0.8	
Registered electors		8,105		
CI hold		Swing		

By-election triggered by death of Colin Bungey in April 2020. By-election not allowed to be held earlier due to COVID-19 pandemic.

==== Highcliffe and Walkford ====
Highcliffe and Walkford: 6 October 2022
Party	Candidate	Votes	%	±%
CI	Andy Martin	1,778	62.0	N/A
Liberal Democrats	Pete Brown	571	19.9	+9.6
Conservative	Christopher van Hagen	358	12.5	−20.0
Labour	David Stokes	163	5.7	−2.4
Majority		1,207	42.1	
Turnout		2,875	33.2	
Rejected ballots		5	0.2	
Registered electors		8,655		
CI hold		Swing	N/A	

By-election triggered by death of Nick Geary in July 2022. He had been elected as an independent in 2019 and sat in the Christchurch Independents group, which was formally registered as a political party in February 2021.
