= Bournemouth, Christchurch and Poole Council =

Unitary local authority for the district of Bournemouth, Christchurch and Poole

- Council logo

Type
- Type: Unitary authority

History
- Founded: 1 April 2019
- Preceded by: Bournemouth Borough Council; Christchurch Borough Council; Poole Borough Council; Dorset County Council

Leadership
- Chair: Lesley Dedman, Christchurch Independents since 23 May 2023
- Leader: Millie Earl, Liberal Democrats since 23 July 2024
- Chief Executive: Aidan Dunn since 2025

Structure
- Seats: 76 councillors
- Graph of the party split among 76 seats.
- Political groups: Administration (41) Liberal Democrats (27) Christchurch Ind. (8) Poole People (4) Independent (2) Other parties (31) Conservative (9) Labour (8) Green (5) BCP Independent Group (4) Independents (4) Reform UK (3) Poole Engage (2)

Elections
- Voting system: First past the post
- Last election: 4 May 2023
- Next election: 6 May 2027

Meeting place
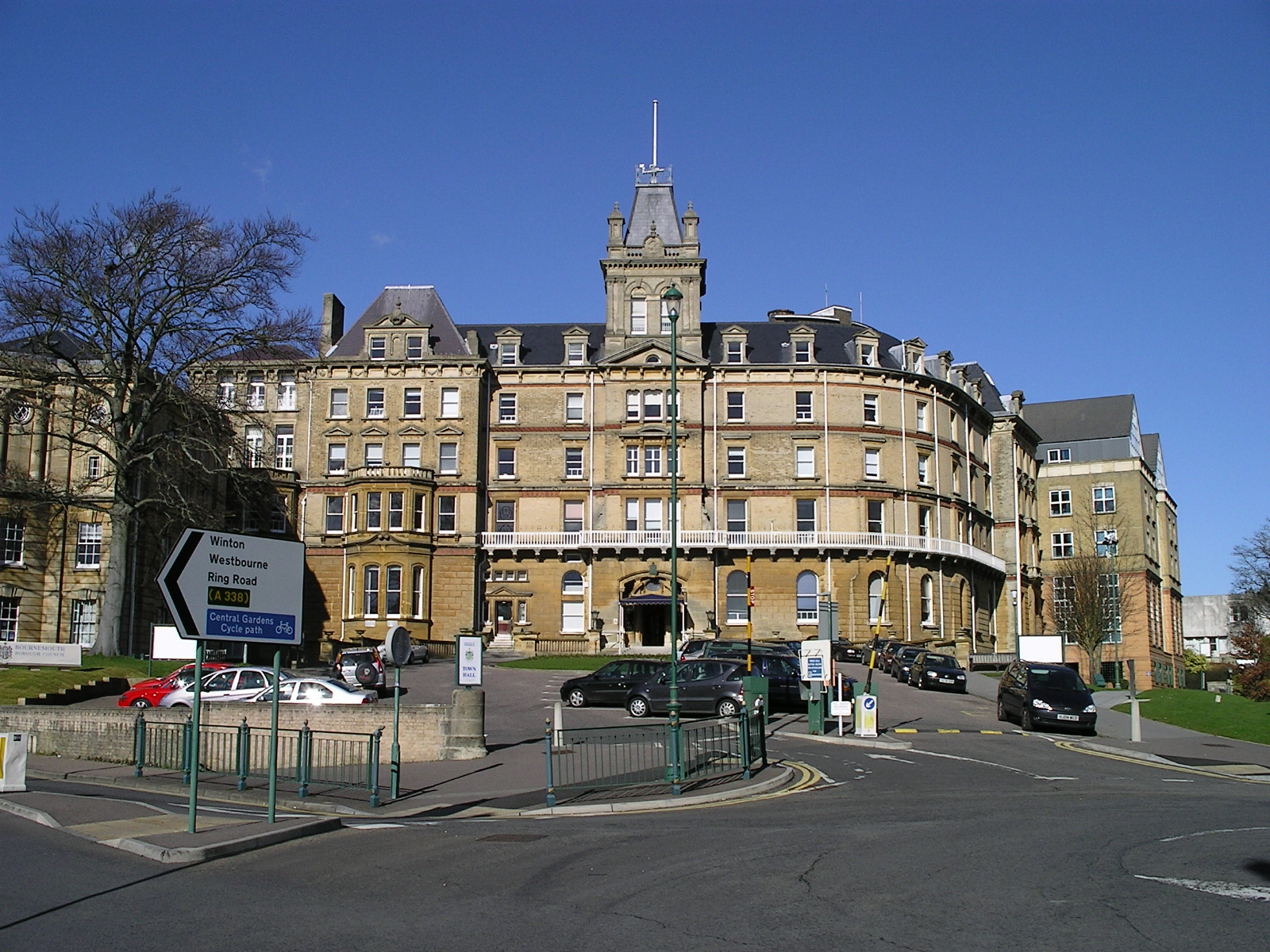
- Civic Centre, Bourne Avenue, Bournemouth, BH2 6DY

Website
- www.bcpcouncil.gov.uk

Bournemouth, Christchurch and Poole Council, which styles itself BCP Council, is the local authority for Bournemouth, Christchurch and Poole, a local government district in the ceremonial county of Dorset, England. The council is a unitary authority, being a district council which also performs the functions of a county council. It is independent from Dorset Council, the unitary authority which administers the rest of the county. The district was created on 1 April 2019 by the merger of the areas that were previously administered by the unitary authorities of Bournemouth and Poole, and the non-metropolitan district of Christchurch.

The council has been under no overall control since 2022. Since the 2023 election it has been run by a coalition of the Liberal Democrats, Christchurch Independents, Poole People Party and some of the independent councillors, led by Liberal Democrat councillor Vikki Slade, until her resignation after being elected as MP for Mid Dorset and North Poole at the 2024 United Kingdom general election in July 2024. She was succeeded by Deputy Leader and fellow Liberal Democrat councillor Millie Earl on 23 July 2024. The council is based at the Civic Centre in Bournemouth.

== History ==
The district of Bournemouth, Christchurch and Poole and its council were created on 1 April 2019, covering the combined area of the three former boroughs of Bournemouth, Christchurch and Poole, which were all abolished at the same time. Bournemouth and Poole had both been unitary authorities since 1997, whilst Christchurch was a lower tier district council, with Dorset County Council providing county-level services in that borough. The way the changes were implemented was to create a new non-metropolitan district and a non-metropolitan county both called Bournemouth, Christchurch and Poole, each covering the area of the three former boroughs. There is no separate county council; instead the district council also performs county council functions, making it a unitary authority. The district remains part of the ceremonial county of Dorset for the purposes of lieutenancy.

A shadow authority was established in May 2018 to oversee the transition, comprising the 120 councillors from the three borough councils plus the five county councillors who represented Christchurch. The shadow authority met in lecture theatres at Bournemouth University, as no council venue was sufficiently large to host all 125 members. Janet Walton, the Conservative leader of Poole Borough Council, was appointed leader of the shadow authority, and John Beesley, the Conservative leader of Bournemouth Borough Council, was appointed as the shadow authority's deputy leader. Ray Nottage, a Conservative former leader of Christchurch Borough Council, was appointed to the more ceremonial position of chair of the shadow authority.

The new district and council formally came into being on 1 April 2019, at which point the old councils were abolished. The shadow authority continued to run the council until the inaugural election in May 2019.

== Governance ==
As a unitary authority, the council provides both district-level and county-level services. There are eight civil parishes in the district, which form an additional tier of local government for their areas.

=== Political control ===
Political control of the council since its formation in 2019 has been as follows:

| Party in Control | Years |
|---|---|
| No overall control | 2019–2021 |
| Conservative | 2021–2022 |
| No overall control | 2022–present |

=== Leadership ===
The shadow authority was led by Janet Walton, Conservative leader of the outgoing Poole Borough Council. She failed to secure a seat on the new council at the first election in May 2019. The leaders of the council since 2019 have been:

| Councillor | Party | From | To |
|---|---|---|---|
| Vikki Slade | Liberal Democrats | 21 May 2019 | 15 Sep 2020 |
| Drew Mellor | Conservative | 1 Oct 2020 | 13 Feb 2023 |
| Philip Broadhead | Conservative | 21 Feb 2023 | May 2023 |
| Vikki Slade | Liberal Democrats | 23 May 2023 | 14 Jul 2024 |
| Millie Earl | Liberal Democrats | 23 Jul 2024 | |

=== Composition ===
Following the 2023 election and subsequent by-elections and changes of allegiance up to May 2025, the composition of the council was:

| Party | Councillors |
|---|---|
| Liberal Democrats | 26 |
| Conservative | 12 |
| Labour | 10 |
| Christchurch Independents | 8 |
| Green | 5 |
| Poole People | 4 |
| Independent | 5 |
| Poole Engage | 2 |
| Total | 76 |

Two of the five independents sit together as the 'Independents Group', the other three do not belong to a group. As no one party controlled a majority of the council the Liberal Democrats, Christchurch Independents, Poole People Party and the Independent Group formed a coalition administration known as the "Three Towns Alliance."

In October 2025 Cllr Cameron Adams and Cllr Duane Farr defected from the Conservative Party to join Reform UK

The next election is due on 6 May 2027.

== Premises ==
The council is based at the Civic Centre on Bourne Avenue in Bournemouth. The older part of the building was completed in 1885 as the Mont Dore Hotel. It was acquired by Bournemouth Borough Council and converted into Bournemouth Town Hall in 1921, with several extensions and annexes being added since then.

When BCP Council was created in 2019, it inherited various municipal buildings from its three predecessors, notably including their three headquarters buildings: Bournemouth Town Hall, the Civic Offices on Bridge Street in Christchurch, completed in 1980, and Poole Civic Centre, on Parkstone Road in Poole, completed in 1932. The council decided to refurbish Bournemouth Town Hall to become its main headquarters, renaming it the Civic Centre, and to sell the other two buildings.

== Political history and controversies ==
The Conservatives had held a majority of the seats on the shadow authority, but the result of the first election left the council under no overall control. The Conservatives were the largest party, but a coalition of all groups other than the Conservatives and UKIP formed a 'Unity Alliance' administration, with Vikki Slade (leader of the Liberal Democrat group) appointed leader of the council.

After two changes of allegiance in October 2019, and the death of Christchurch Independents councillor Colin Bungey in April 2020, the Unity Alliance was left one seat short of a majority. Whereas a by-election would normally have been held to fill the vacant seat, this was postponed due to the COVID-19 pandemic. Conservative group leader, Drew Mellor, moved a vote of no confidence, which was held on 9 June 2020. The 36 Conservatives and one independent voted for the motion and all 37 Unity Alliance councillors voted against; the single UKIP councillor abstained. The vote was thus tied 37-37, and the chairman of the council, David Flagg, used his casting vote to defeat the motion, dedicating it to the memory of the late Colin Bungey.

In the three months after that confidence vote, Liberal Democrat councillor Pete Parish died in July 2020, and independent (and former Poole People) councillor Julie Bagwell left the Unity Alliance. A second vote of no confidence was tabled by Mellor for 15 September 2020, which this time was carried, with 39 votes in support and 33 against, ending Vikki Slade's tenure as leader. Mellor was appointed the new leader of the council at a subsequent meeting on 1 October 2020. The Christchurch Independents group rejected Mellor's overtures to become part of the new administration, so the Conservatives formed a minority administration.

In September 2021, four councillors from various groups joined the Conservatives, giving the party a majority on the council for the first time.

The Conservatives lost their majority in June 2022 when four of their councillors left the party to form the Poole Local Group with independent councillor Julie Bagwell.

=== FuturePlaces ===
In 2021, the council set up an urban regeneration company, BCP FuturePlaces Limited. The company attracted controversy from the outset, with concerns about the six-figure salaries paid to its management and its reliance on public money, including an £8 million loan from the council advanced in 2022. The delivery of regeneration projects proved slower than originally anticipated, and concerns were identified in a best value inspection from the government in 2023 which said councillors were too involved in the day-to-day running of the company. The council therefore decided in September 2023 to close the company and bring its regeneration sites and projects back under direct council management.

=== Bournemouth city status ===
In 2021 the council bid for Bournemouth to be awarded city status as part of the Platinum Jubilee Civic Honours contest. It later transpired that the application document, though for Bournemouth only, also contained photographs of multiple sites in Poole and Christchurch. The application was unsuccessful, with the three new cities in England created following that contest being Colchester, Doncaster and Milton Keynes.

=== Abolition of the overview and scrutiny board ===
The Conservative administration of Drew Mellor was criticised in 2022 for its abolition of the council's overview and scrutiny board, one of the main mechanisms by which opposition parties were able hold the administration to account. The decision was criticised both as a matter of principle and for the way in which the abolition was secured. The debate on abolishing the board was held at a full council meeting on 26 April 2022. Due to a large number of absences on the Conservative side, the opposition won an amendment that would have retained the board. Two Conservative councillors with COVID were then telephoned during an interval and turned up to the debate shortly afterwards, despite having sent apologies hours previously on COVID-related grounds. The meeting was then adjourned due to safety concerns. At the reconvened meeting on 10 May there were enough Conservatives present to win a further amendment which abolished the overview and scrutiny board and replaced it with four smaller committees which would meet less frequently. Members of the Conservative group were elected as chairs and vice-chairs of these new committees, contrary to normal practice at local authorities that scrutiny committees are chaired by opposition councillors.

=== Beach huts ===
In February 2022, as part of its proposed budget, the Conservative administration announced plans to sell the council's 3,600 beach huts to a new council-owned company, which would buy the huts at market value with loans from the council and third party lenders. The plan was said to be able to raise £54 million. The idea was heavily criticised by opposition councillors, who described it as a "reverse equity release scheme" and "immoral".

At a meeting on 22 February 2022, council leader Drew Mellor denied rumours that the council had had reports prepared by consultants KPMG examining the issue, instead saying that workshops had been held with them and the council's auditors, which had given comfort that the approach was legitimate and within accounting rules. It subsequently transpired that two reports on the issue had been prepared by KPMG in 2021, which had raised concerns that if the council provided loans or guarantees to enable a company to buy the council's own assets, that may be deemed improper. It also emerged that the reports had not been released in February 2022 at the specific suggestion of Drew Mellor.

The government also intervened in the row, with the Secretary of State for Levelling Up, Housing and Communities, Greg Clark, having meetings with the council. These led to the council applying for alternative sources of funding from government, and a letter from Greg Clark to all councils in August 2022 criticising "dodgy deals" which attempted to exploit loopholes in council spending rules.

=== Petition to remove leadership ===
A petition from local residents to remove Drew Mellor and his deputy, Philip Broadhead, from office was debated at BCP Council on 8 November 2022, having attracted 2,066 valid signatures. The council voted to take no action over the petition.

=== 'Cleaning for votes' ===
Around the start of 2023, Conservative councillor Mark Anderson, the administration's portfolio holder for environment and place, devised what came to be known as "cleaning for votes", a street-cleaning scheme aimed at benefitting wards the Conservatives hoped to retain or win in the May 2023 local elections. An independent report on the matter concluded that he had breached the council's code of conduct. It was also reported to Dorset Police, who decided to take no action as the scheme had not actually been implemented. Anderson resigned in March 2023.

=== Resignation of Drew Mellor and administration of Philip Broadhead ===
Whilst the investigation into cleaning for votes was underway, and amid criticism of his administration's proposals for the 2023 budget, Drew Mellor resigned as leader on 13 February 2023 and announced he would not be standing for re-election in the May 2023 local elections.

Conservative councillor Philip Broadhead, who had been deputy leader under Mellor since 2020, was subsequently appointed leader on 21 February 2023. He only served as leader for three months. The Conservative vote collapsed at the May 2023 local elections, with Broadhead's group reduced from 34 to 12 seats (out of 76). Several cabinet members lost their seats; Broadhead himself retained his seat by just five votes. Other groups increased their vote share substantially, with the Liberal Democrats emerging as the largest party, with 28 seats (up from 13).

=== Three Towns Alliance ===
On 23 May 2023, Vikki Slade was elected leader of BCP Council unopposed; she would be leading a coalition administration, 'the Three Towns Alliance', comprising all 28 Liberal Democrat councillors, the 8 Christchurch Independents, the Bournemouth Independents Group (3 councillors), and the Poole People's Party (5 councillors). Vikki Slade stood down as leader in July 2024 after being elected MP for Mid Dorset and North Poole at the 2024 United Kingdom general election. She was replaced as leader by Millie Earl, also a Liberal Democrat.

=== 2025-2026 defections ===
In 2025, Gillian Martin and Michelle Dower resigned from the Labour Party. In October 2025, the two conservative Kinson councillors Duane Farr and Cameron Adams joined Reform UK. In May 2026, Kate and Joe Salmon, who represent Moordown ward resigned from the Green Party of England and Wales to sit as independents.

== Elections ==
Since the first election in 2019 the council has comprised 76 councillors representing 33 wards, with each ward electing two or three councillors. Elections are held every four years.

=== Wards ===
Map of wards

The 33 wards are:

| Ward | Councillors |
|---|---|
| Alderney and Bourne Valley | 3 |
| Bearwood and Merley | 3 |
| Boscombe East and Pokesdown | 2 |
| Boscombe West | 2 |
| Bournemouth Central | 2 |
| Broadstone | 2 |
| Burton and Grange | 2 |
| Canford Cliffs | 2 |
| Canford Heath | 3 |
| Christchurch Town | 2 |
| Commons | 2 |
| Creekmoor | 2 |
| East Cliff and Springbourne | 3 |
| East Southbourne and Tuckton | 2 |
| Hamworthy | 3 |
| Highcliffe and Walkford | 2 |
| Kinson | 3 |
| Littledown and Iford | 2 |
| Moordown | 2 |
| Mudeford, Stanpit and West Highcliffe | 2 |
| Muscliff and Strouden Park | 3 |
| Newtown and Heatherlands | 3 |
| Oakdale | 2 |
| Parkstone | 2 |
| Penn Hill | 2 |
| Poole Town | 3 |
| Queen's Park | 2 |
| Redhill and Northbourne | 2 |
| Talbot and Branksome Woods | 3 |
| Wallisdown and Winton West | 2 |
| Westbourne and West Cliff | 2 |
| West Southbourne | 2 |
| Winton East | 2 |

== See also ==
- South East Dorset conurbation
