= Bournemouth, Christchurch and Poole =

Unitary authority area in Dorset, England

- Unitary authority area

- Bournemouth, Christchurch and Poole shown within Dorset
- Coordinates: 50.723°N 1.882°W
- Sovereign state: United Kingdom
- Constituent country: England
- Region: South West England
- Ceremonial county: Dorset
- Historic county: Dorset (Poole); Hampshire (Bournemouth and Christchurch)
- Admin HQ: Civic Centre

Government
  - Type: Unitary authority
  - Governing body: Bournemouth, Christchurch and Poole Council
  - Chair: Lesley Dedman
  - Leader: Millie Earl (Lib Dems)

Area
  - Total: 63 sq mi (162 km^{2})
  - Rank: 159th (of 296)

Population (2025)
  - Total: 405,829
  - Rank: 19th (of 296)
  - Density: 6,490/sq mi (2,504/km^{2})

Ethnicity (2021)
  - Ethnic groups: List: 91.3% White; 3.4% Asian; 2.8% Mixed; 1.5% other; 1.1% Black

Religion (2021)
  - Religion: List: 46.8% Christianity; 42.2% no religion; 9.3% other; 1.7% Islam
- Time zone: UTC+0 (Greenwich Mean Time)
- Postcodes: BH
- Area codes: 01202; 01425
- ISO 3166-2: BCP
- GSS code: E06000058
- Website: bcpcouncil.gov.uk

Bournemouth, Christchurch and Poole (BCP) is a unitary authority area in the ceremonial county of Dorset, England. It was created in 2019 and covers much of the area of the South East Dorset conurbation, including the towns of Bournemouth, Poole and Christchurch.

== Background ==
Districts of Dorset prior to the creation of BCP

Bournemouth and Christchurch were historically part of the county of Hampshire, while Poole was historically a part of Dorset and was a county corporate. By the mid-20th century, the towns had begun to coalesce as a conurbation, and in the Local Government Act 1972 the three areas were brought together under the non-metropolitan county of Dorset, while still administered as separate districts. In 1997, Poole and Bournemouth became unitary authorities, while Christchurch remained a lower tier district with county-level services provided by Dorset County Council.

The new authority was formed as a result of local government reorganisation in the ceremonial county of Dorset. Under the plans, dubbed "Future Dorset", all councils within the county were abolished and replaced with two new unitary authorities. One was formed from the existing unitary authorities of Bournemouth Borough Council and Poole Borough Council, which merged with the non-metropolitan district of Christchurch to create the unitary authority to be known as Bournemouth, Christchurch and Poole. The other non-metropolitan districts of Dorset merged to form Dorset unitary authority.

The plans were supported by every affected body except Christchurch Borough Council, which formally opposed the reorganisation and unsuccessfully challenged the proposals in the High Court. Several Conservative councillors in Christchurch were suspended from the party for their opposition to the plan, leading to several of them standing as independents in the 2019 election.

== Bournemouth, Christchurch and Poole Council ==
Statutory instruments for the creation of the new authority were made on behalf of the Secretary of State for Housing, Communities and Local Government on 25 May 2018, and a shadow authority was formed the following day. The shadow authority was composed of the existing borough councillors from Bournemouth, Christchurch and Poole, as well as the county councillors representing Christchurch. The shadow authority had 125 members, and first met on 6 June 2018. However, later that year a review by the Local Government Boundary Commission reduced the number of wards for the new authority to 33 multi-member wards, with 76 councillors in total.

The first elections took place in 2019 alongside other local elections, and led to the Conservatives holding the most seats but lacking a majority, meaning that the council was under no overall control. Subsequent to the election, the Liberal Democrats, the second largest party in the council, led the creation of the Unity Alliance Administration, made up of the Liberal Democrats (15), independents (11), Poole People (7), Labour (3), Green Party (2) and Alliance for Local Living (1). The Unity Alliance therefore had 39 members, the number required for a majority. The remaining councillors, belonging to the Conservative Party (36) and UKIP (1), remained in opposition. However, two Unity Alliance councillors died in 2020, and two Poole People councillors left both their party and the administration, leaving the administration in minority; a vote of no confidence in council leader Vikki Slade was subsequently passed, removing her as leader. A new leader was elected on 1 October 2020.

== Geography ==
The authority lies in the south east of the ceremonial county of Dorset around 95 miles (153 km) from London. Dorset as a whole is part of the South West England region for statistical purposes. The three former boroughs are all historically seaside towns with tourism playing an important part in the local economy. Bournemouth lies north of Poole Bay, Poole is north of Poole Harbour, whilst Christchurch contains Christchurch Harbour, with the Isle of Wight and Solent to the east and English Channel to the south and east.

Bournemouth, Christchurch and Poole roughly overlaps with the South East Dorset conurbation, although the conurbation also spreads into the former East Dorset and the New Forest district of Hampshire. The conurbation is bordered by the South West Hampshire/South East Dorset Green Belt, created between 1958 and 1980, which regulates environmental and planning policy to manage development expansion.

=== Climate ===
Bournemouth, Christchurch and Poole has an oceanic temperate climate. The presence of the Gulf Stream ensures that the British Isles maintain an all-year-round ambient temperature, and, because of its position on the south coast of England, the area has slightly warmer winters and cooler summers than settlements further inland.

Climate data for Bournemouth Hurn 33 feet (10 metres) asl, 1981–2010, (Note: In accordance with World Meteorological Organization (WMO) recommendations, the Met Office maintains long-term averages of the UK climate, based on standard 30-year periods. The latest 30-year period is for 1981–2010.) Extremes 1960–
Month	Jan	Feb	Mar	Apr	May	Jun	Jul	Aug	Sep	Oct	Nov	Dec	Year
Record high °C (°F)	14.7 (58.5)	17.8 (64.0)	21.0 (69.8)	25.0 (77.0)	27.6 (81.7)	33.8 (92.8)	33.9 (93.0)	34.1 (93.4)	27.9 (82.2)	25.2 (77.4)	19.8 (67.6)	16.0 (60.8)	34.1 (93.4)
Mean daily maximum °C (°F)	8.4 (47.1)	8.5 (47.3)	11.0 (51.8)	13.5 (56.3)	17.0 (62.6)	19.8 (67.6)	22.1 (71.8)	22.0 (71.6)	19.3 (66.7)	15.3 (59.5)	11.5 (52.7)	8.7 (47.7)	14.8 (58.6)
Mean daily minimum °C (°F)	1.5 (34.7)	1.2 (34.2)	2.7 (36.9)	3.8 (38.8)	7.2 (45.0)	9.8 (49.6)	11.9 (53.4)	11.6 (52.9)	9.4 (48.9)	7.1 (44.8)	3.7 (38.7)	1.6 (34.9)	6.0 (42.7)
Record low °C (°F)	−13.4 (7.9)	−10.9 (12.4)	−10.2 (13.6)	−5.7 (21.7)	−3.6 (25.5)	0.4 (32.7)	2.6 (36.7)	2.1 (35.8)	−1.4 (29.5)	−6.4 (20.5)	−9.6 (14.7)	−10.5 (13.1)	−13.4 (7.9)
Average rainfall mm (inches)	86.9 (3.42)	62.5 (2.46)	64.7 (2.55)	53.9 (2.12)	49.5 (1.95)	51.6 (2.03)	47.8 (1.88)	51.8 (2.04)	65.3 (2.57)	100.7 (3.96)	100.5 (3.96)	100.0 (3.94)	835.2 (32.88)
Average rainy days	12.8	9.6	10.8	9.1	8.8	7.7	7.9	7.3	9.0	12.6	12.5	12.3	120.4
Mean monthly sunshine hours	66.5	84.5	121.4	185.1	218.5	229.5	232.0	214.6	159.1	115.2	80.1	60.3	1,766.8
Source: Met Office

Climate data for Christchurch, Dorset, England
Month	Jan	Feb	Mar	Apr	May	Jun	Jul	Aug	Sep	Oct	Nov	Dec	Year
Mean daily maximum °C (°F)	8 (46)	8 (46)	11 (52)	13 (55)	17 (63)	19 (66)	22 (72)	22 (72)	19 (66)	15 (59)	11 (52)	9 (48)	14.5 (58.1)
Mean daily minimum °C (°F)	2 (36)	2 (36)	3 (37)	4 (39)	7 (45)	10 (50)	12 (54)	12 (54)	10 (50)	7 (45)	4 (39)	3 (37)	6.3 (43.3)
Average precipitation mm (inches)	62.9 (2.48)	50.3 (1.98)	40.7 (1.60)	45.5 (1.79)	29.2 (1.15)	35.6 (1.40)	31.8 (1.25)	35.5 (1.40)	51.5 (2.03)	75.3 (2.96)	69.0 (2.72)	67.2 (2.65)	594.5 (23.41)
Source: MSN

Climate data for Poole, Dorset, England
Month	Jan	Feb	Mar	Apr	May	Jun	Jul	Aug	Sep	Oct	Nov	Dec	Year
Mean daily maximum °C (°F)	8 (46)	8 (46)	11 (52)	13 (55)	17 (63)	19 (66)	22 (72)	22 (72)	19 (66)	15 (59)	11 (52)	9 (48)	14.5 (58.1)
Mean daily minimum °C (°F)	2 (36)	2 (36)	3 (37)	4 (39)	7 (45)	10 (50)	12 (54)	12 (54)	10 (50)	7 (45)	4 (39)	3 (37)	6.3 (43.3)
Average precipitation mm (inches)	62.9 (2.48)	50.3 (1.98)	40.7 (1.60)	45.5 (1.79)	29.2 (1.15)	35.6 (1.40)	31.8 (1.25)	35.5 (1.40)	51.5 (2.03)	73.5 (2.89)	69.0 (2.72)	67.2 (2.65)	592.6 (23.33)
Source: MSN

=== Demographics ===
Bournemouth, Christchurch and Poole Green belt County borders District borders

The major settlements within Bournemouth, Christchurch and Poole are Bournemouth, Poole, Christchurch and Merley / Oakley. Within the ceremonial county of Dorset, Bournemouth and Poole are the largest two settlements, whilst Christchurch is the fourth, after Weymouth.

== Media ==
In terms of television, the area is served by BBC South and ITV Meridian broadcasting from the Rowridge transmitter.

The BBC Local Radio station is BBC Radio Solent. Commercial radio stations in the region include Heart South, Capital South, Greatest Hits Radio South, Hits Radio Dorset, and Nation Radio South Coast. Local community radio stations are Hot Radio in Poole, and Hope FM, a Christian station in Bournemouth.

The area is served by the local newspaper, Bournemouth Daily Echo.

== Politics ==
Bournemouth, Christchurch and Poole is divided into five parliamentary constituencies: Bournemouth East, Bournemouth West, Christchurch, Mid Dorset and North Poole, and Poole.

Following the 2024 United Kingdom general election, the area has three members of Parliament (MPs) from the Labour Party and one each from the Conservatives and Liberal Democrats:

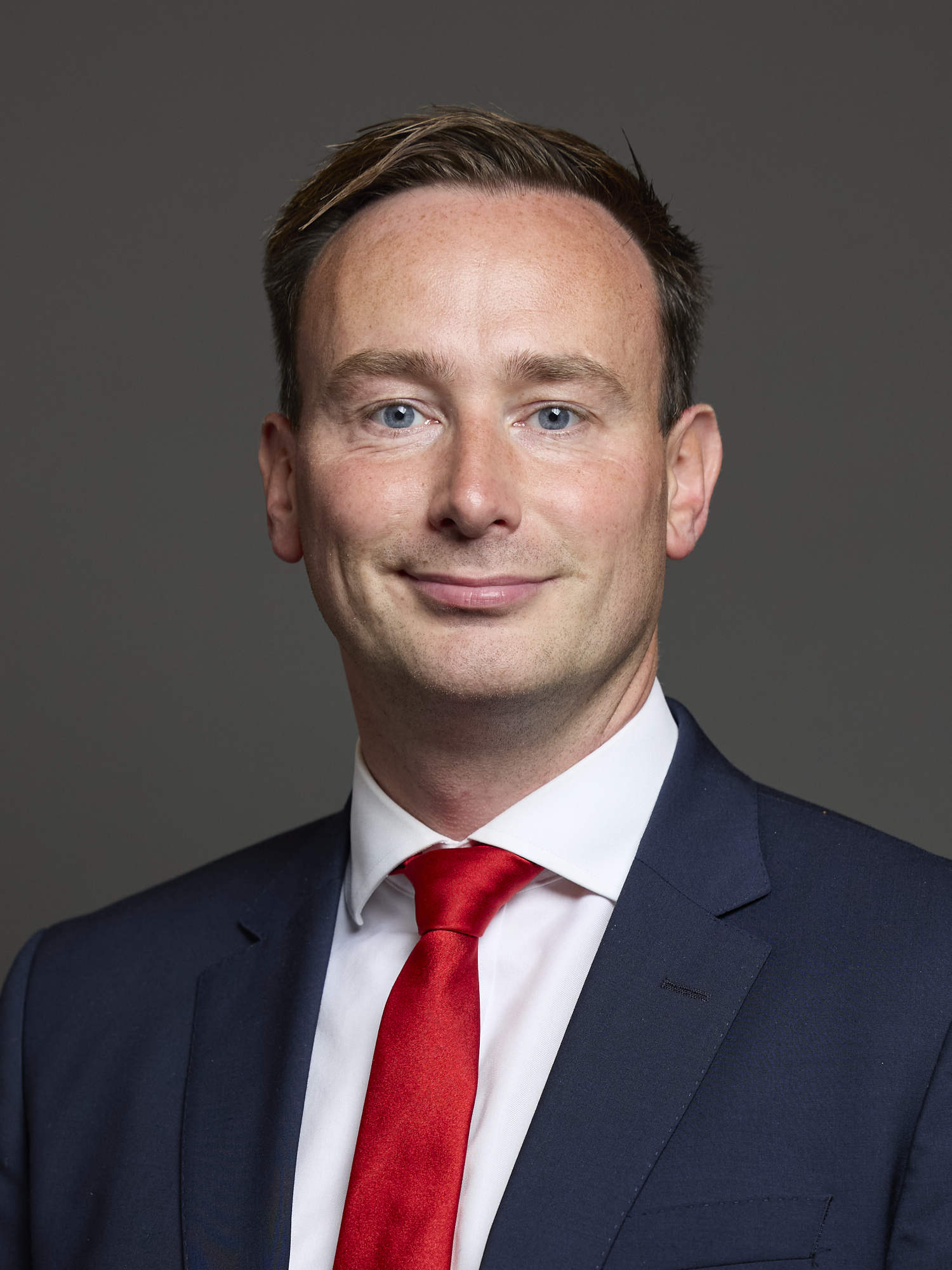
Tom Hayes, Labour MP for Bournemouth East

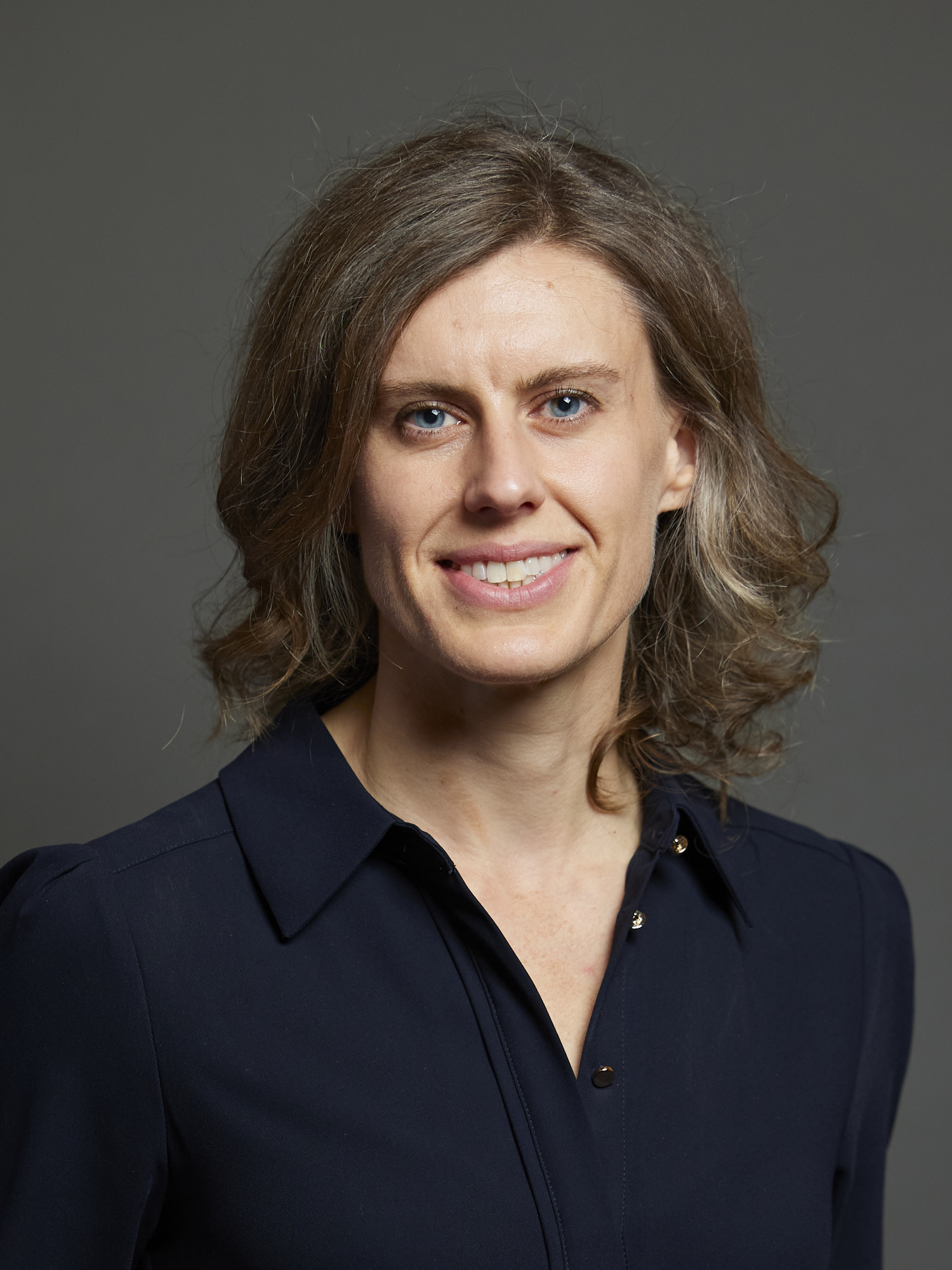
Jessica Toale, Labour MP for Bournemouth West

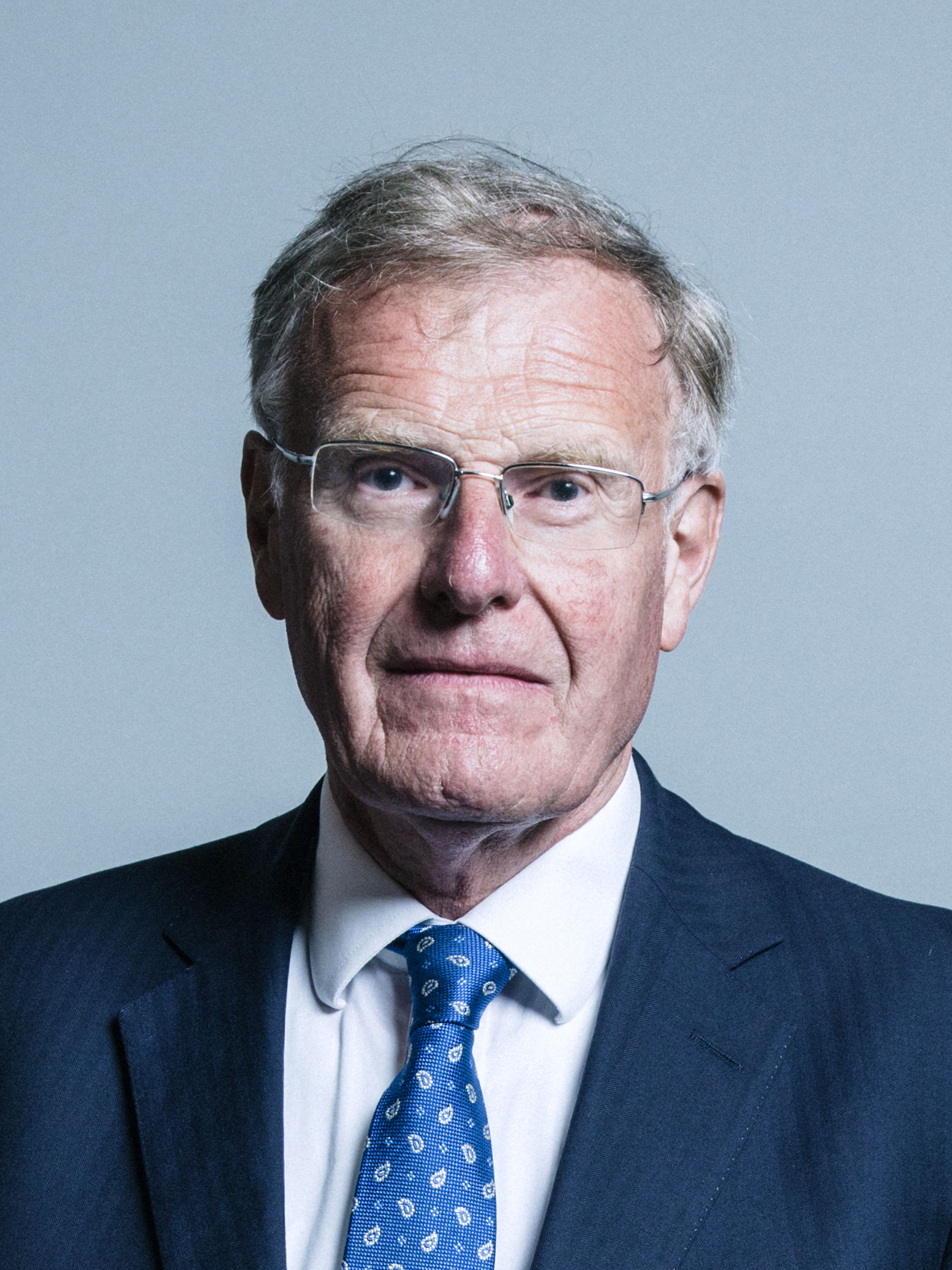
Christopher Chope, Conservative MP for Christchurch

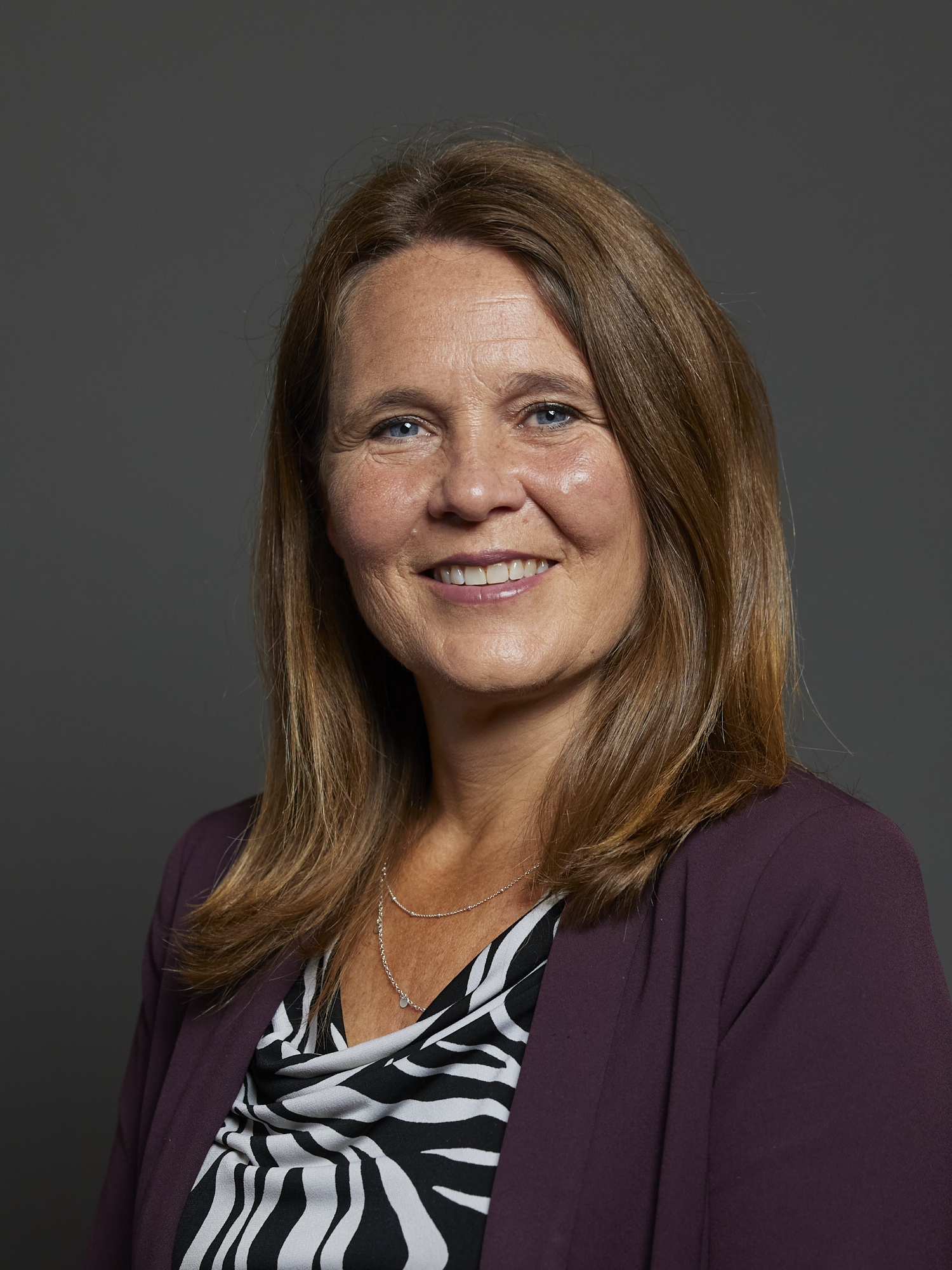
Vikki Slade, Liberal Democrat MP for Mid Dorset and North Poole

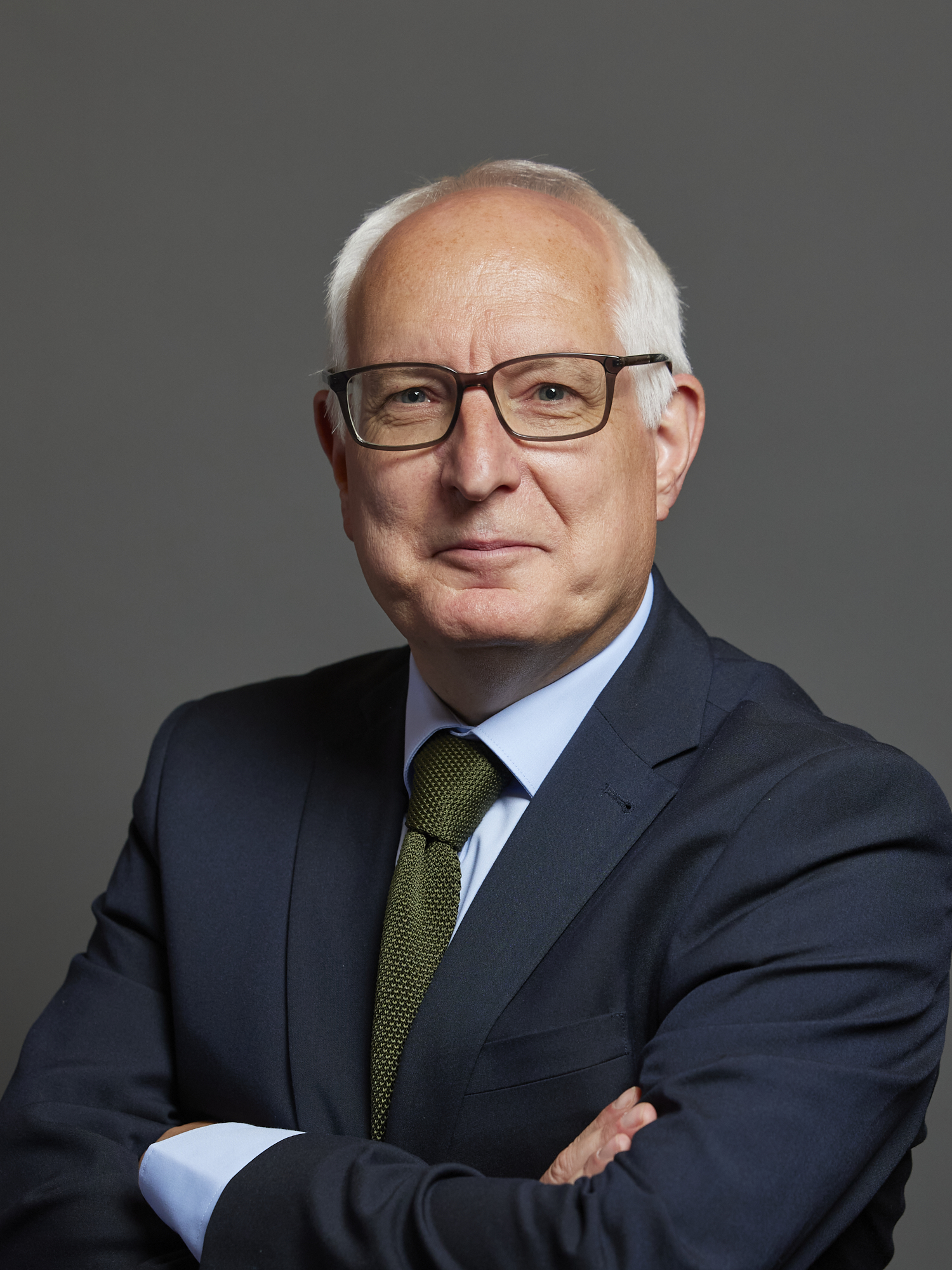
Neil Duncan-Jordan, Labour MP for Poole

From 1 April 2026 the whole of the district is covered by civil parishes.

- Bournemouth
- Broadstone
- Burton and Winkton
- Christchurch
- Highcliffe and Walkford
- Hurn
- Poole
- Throop and Holdenhurst
