= Alderney and Bourne Valley =

Electoral ward in Poole, Dorset, England

Alderney and Bourne
- ward Bournemouth, Christchurch and Poole Council
- Boundary of Alderney and Bourne in Bournemouth, Christchurch and Poole.
- Major settlements: Alderney; Bourne Valley; Branksome

Current ward
- Created: 2019
- Councillor: Tony Trent (Liberal Democrats)
- Councillor: Rachel Maidment (Liberal Democrats)
- Councillor: Adrian Chapmanpaw (Liberal Democrats)
- Created from: Alderney; Branksome East; Branksome West (part)

2003–2019
- Number of councillors: 3 (Alderney)

2003–2019
- Number of councillors: 2 (Branksome East)

2003–2019
- Number of councillors: 2 (Branksome West)
- UK Parliament constituency: Bournemouth West
- UK Parliament constituency: Poole

Alderney and Bourne Valley is a ward in Poole, Dorset. Since 2019, the ward has elected 3 councillors to Bournemouth, Christchurch and Poole Council.

== Geography ==
The ward primarily covers the areas of Alderney and Bourne Valley; including Alder Hills and northern Rossmore. It covers most of the area of the former Poole Borough Council Wards of Alderney, and Branksome East, as well as parts of Branksome West. The ward is divided between the parliamentary constituencies of Poole and Bournemouth West.

== Councillors ==
The ward is currently represented by three Liberal Democrat councillors.

=== Alderney and Bourne Valley ===
Election	Councillors		
2019	Tony Trent (Liberal Democrats)	Rachel Maidment (Liberal Democrats)	Toby Johnson (Liberal Democrats)
2021	Tony Trent (Liberal Democrats)	Rachel Maidment (Liberal Democrats)	Toby Johnson (Conservative)
2023	Tony Trent (Liberal Democrats)	Rachel Maidment (Liberal Democrats)	Adrian David Chapmanlaw (Liberal Democrats)

=== Former Wards ===
==== Alderney ====
Election	Councillors		
At least 1998	Bob Dugdale (Liberal Democrats)		
2003	Bob Dugdale (Liberal Democrats)	Tony Trent (Liberal Democrats)	Charles Meachin (Liberal Democrats)
2004 by-election	Lindsay Wilson (Liberal Democrats)	Tony Trent (Liberal Democrats)	Charles Meachin (Liberal Democrats)
2007	Lindsay Wilson (Liberal Democrats)	Tony Trent (Liberal Democrats)	Charles Meachin (Liberal Democrats)
2011	Lindsay Wilson (Liberal Democrats)	Tony Trent (Liberal Democrats)	Charles Meachin (Liberal Democrats)
2015	Mike Fisher (UKIP)	Louise Russell (Conservative)	Russell Trent (Conservative)

==== Branksome East ====
Election	Councillors	
2003	Mary Hillman (Conservative)	Jonathan Pethen (Conservative)
2007	Mary Hillman (Conservative)	Guy Montrose (Conservative)
2008 by-election	Karen Rampton (Conservative)	Guy Montrose (Conservative)
2011	Stephen Rollo-Smith (Conservative)	Karen Rampton (Conservative)
2012 by-election	Jane Thomas (Conservative)	Karen Rampton (Conservative)
2015	Drew Mellor (Conservative)	Karen Rampton (Conservative)

=== Election results ===
Alderney and Bourne Valley (3 seats)
Party	Candidate	Votes	%	±%
Liberal Democrats	Tony Trent	1,241	36.3	
Liberal Democrats	Rachel Maidment	1,142	33.4	
Liberal Democrats	Toby Johnson	1,022	29.9	
Conservative	Benjamin Levy	821	24.0	
Poole People	Benjamin Norton	758	22.2	
Conservative	Gregory Welch	653	19.1	
Conservative	Trevor Watts	651	19.1	
UKIP	Joe Cryans	631	18.5	
Labour	Henry Land	615	18.0	
Labour	Lisa Weir	581	17.0	
Labour	David Stokes	505	14.8	
ALL	Claire Crescent	447	13.1	
Independent	Martin Smalley	303	8.9	
Majority				
Turnout		3,415	28.21%	
Liberal Democrats win (new seat)				
Liberal Democrats win (new seat)				
Liberal Democrats win (new seat)				

Alderney By-Election 18 March 2004
Party	Candidate	Votes	%	±%
Liberal Democrats	Lindsay Wilson	1,392	58.4	+11.4
Conservative	Wendy Herring	527	22.1	−13.7
Labour	Philip Murray	327	13.7	−0.7
Independent	Nicholas Tapping	77	3.2	+3.2
Independent	Doreen Renphrey	61	2.6	+2.6
Majority		825	36.3	
Turnout		2,384	30.3	
Liberal Democrats hold		Swing		
