= Canford Heath =

Suburb and area of heathland in Dorset, England

Coordinates: 50.75125°N 1.96194°W

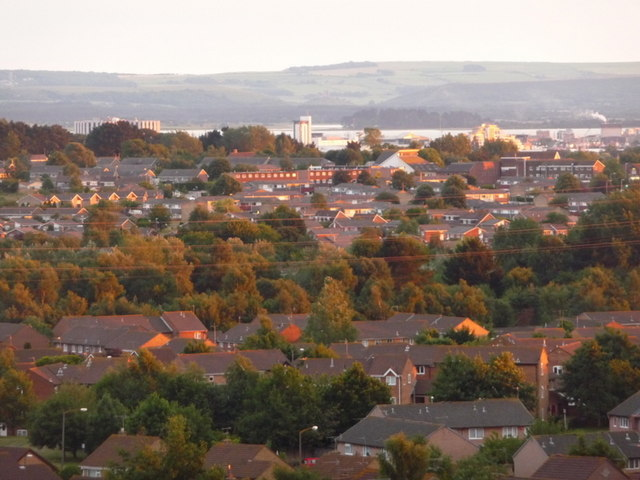
- View across the modern settlement of Canford Heath

- Location within Dorset
- Population: 14,387 (ward, 2021)
- OS grid reference: SZ027946
- Unitary authority: Bournemouth, Christchurch and Poole
- Ceremonial county: Dorset
- Region: South West
- Country: England
- Sovereign state: United Kingdom
- Post town: POOLE
- Postcode district: BH17
- Dialling code: 01202
- Police: Dorset
- Fire: Dorset and Wiltshire
- Ambulance: South Western
- UK Parliament: Mid Dorset and North Poole

Canford Heath is a suburb, an area of heathland, and an electoral ward in Poole. It has been described as one of the largest housing estates in Europe. It is also known for being the largest heathland in Dorset, and the largest lowland heath in the UK. It is also the name of the housing development built on the heathland in the 1960s, 1970s, and 1980s. At the 2021 census the population of the ward was 14,387.

== Etymology ==
The name of Canford Heath is first attested in the Domesday Book of 1086 as Cheneford, with subsequent medieval spellings along the lines of Keneford (1181) and Caneford (1195). Scholars agree that the second part of the name derives from Old English ford ("ford"). The first part of the name is usually given as an Old English personal name Cana, but it has been suggested that this element was actually the common noun cāna ("jackdaws'", genitive plural of cā). Thus the name once meant either "Cana's ford" or "jackdaws' ford".

The form Canford Heath, with heath added to distinguish the place from Canford Cliffs, is first attested in 1811, but the area was previously known, often without the Canford element, as the launds of Caneford (1275), the hethe (1542), and the greate waste of Canford (1612).

== History ==
Historically, Canford Heath was part of the Canford Estate; in the Domesday Book, the manor of Cheneford was held by Edward of Salisbury. Canford Heath was common land. In 1810, it was subdivided among Poole's Proprietors, in response to the 1805 Enclosure Act, which "enabled the enclosure of over 9000 acres of 'Common Meadows, Heaths, Waste Lands and Commonable Grounds'".

In the early 20th century, Canford Heath had many different uses. In 1929, a hill climb event organized by the "Motorcycle and Light Car Club" was staged on the earth, and during the Second World War, the heath was used as a munitions storage. In 1938, most of the heath burned in a series of large fires.

In 1944, it was proposed that Canford Heath should be "preserved from business development" after the War, although in 1946, a plan was issued by Professor Abercrombie that suggested the use of Canford Heath as a housing development, in preference to building in the New Forest. In 1947, there was another large heath fire. In 1958, five boys were injured in an explosion after digging up a shell. This was after the heath had been searched after World War II ended before development began.

Building work began on a housing development in 1963 in South Canford Heath, while Parkstone and Poole grammar schools were relocated to the edge of the heath in 1962 and 1968 respectively, and the first combined school opened in Canford Heath in 1970. Housing development began in 1973 in North Canford Heath, and in 1980, International Supermarket and formerly Somerfield (now Asda) became North Canford Heath's first supermarket.

In 1984, planning permission was given for development of all of Canford Heath, providing that the site did not become a Site of Special Scientific Interest (SSSI). In response, an application was made in 1985 for much of Canford Heath to become a SSSI, due to the rare habitat and wildlife on the heathland. The application was accepted in 1988, although developers were still permitted to build houses on land not in the SSSI. A report by the Conservation Committee of the British Herpetological Society to the House of Lords in 1988 said that "more than half of Canford, our largest single heath, is being built over with most of its reptiles doomed or already lost", and a 1988 New Scientist article claimed that the SSSI boundary had been drawn around planning permission on the heath granted by Bournemouth Council, and that houses could be built as little as 50 m away from the SSSI, endangering rare reptiles. In 1991, then Secretary of State Michael Heseltine revoked planning consent for development on all of Canford Heath. In 2008, planning permission was given to develop homes on a former landfill site not in the SSSI, but plans were later abandoned. The former landfill site is now being restored to heathland.

In 2006, a heath fire started by arsonists caused around 100 people to be evacuated from their homes, and required around 170 firefighters to extinguish. Around 0.34–0.45 km^{2} of heathland burned.

In 2015, another fire spread over 2 ha of heathland, and required 70 firefighters; the damage caused could take 15–25 years for the heath to return to its former state.

On 23 April 2022, a large fire broke out on the heath, close to Mannings Heath roundabout. Twenty homes were evacuated, and an area of approximately 0.167 km^{2} was burnt. Dozens of animals were reported killed, and Dorset Wildlife Trust said that it would take 15 years for the heath to be restored. On 25 April, Dorset & Wiltshire Fire and Rescue Service investigators said that the fire was started deliberately. On 14 May, another fire broke out on the heath. On 22 May, a third fire broke out. The fire service confirmed that it was once again due to "human intervention".

== Heathland ==
Canford Heath is Dorset's largest heathland, and much of it is a Site of Special Scientific Interest and part of the Dorset Heathlands Special Protection Area. Canford Heath is the largest lowland heath in the United Kingdom, and is home to many rare species, including the smooth snake, sand lizard, and Dartford warbler. To maintain the heathland and its wildlife, a 10-year management plan was introduced in 2010. In 2009, an episode of Springwatch was filmed at Canford Heath's Hatchpond.

== Geography ==
Canford Heath has grown its own community life with two public houses (the Haymoor and Pilot), churches, an ASDA supermarket, five schools and a range of social activities for young people. The Tower Park leisure complex is nearby.

== Schools ==
In September 2013, Poole Council changed its age of transfer, adopting the primary school system in favour of the previous middle school system. As such, all first and middle schools became primary schools. There are three primary schools in Canford Heath (Ad Astra Primary School, Haymoor Primary School, and Canford Heath Primary School) and two secondary schools (Magna Academy and Poole Grammar School). Poole Grammar School is a selective all-male school. There is also a special educational needs school (Longspee School and Service).

== Politics ==
Canford Heath
- ward Bournemouth, Christchurch and Poole Council
- Boundary of Canford Heath in Bournemouth, Christchurch and Poole.
- Major settlements: Canford Heath

Current ward
- Created: 2019
- Councillor: Sandra Moore (Liberal Democrats)
- Councillor: Chris Matthews (Liberal Democrats)
- Councillor: Clare Weight (Liberal Democrats)
- Created from: Canford Heath East; Canford Heath West

2003–2019
- Number of councillors: 2

2003–2019
- Number of councillors: 2
- UK Parliament constituency: Mid Dorset and North Poole

For the purposes of national elections, since 1997 Canford Heath has been part of the Mid Dorset and North Poole constituency; previously it was part of the Poole constituency. The current MP is Vikki Slade, who won the seat in 2024.

Since 2019, Canford Heath ward has elected 3 councillors to Bournemouth, Christchurch and Poole Council.

Canford Heath was formerly part of two wards on Poole Borough Council; Canford Heath East and Canford Heath West.

=== Councillors ===
The ward is currently represented by three Liberal Democrat councillors. Due to the death of Pete Parish in 2020, a by-election was held in 2021 (delayed due to the COVID-19 Pandemic), which Sean Gabriel of the Conservative Party won. In the 4th May 2023 local elections, Sean Gabriel lost his seat and Clare Weight of the Liberal Democrats was elected.

Election	Councillors		
2023	Sandra Moore (Liberal Democrats)	Chris Matthews (Liberal Democrats)	Clare Weight (Liberal Democrats)
2021 by-election	Sandra Moore (Liberal Democrats)	Chris Matthews (Liberal Democrats)	Sean Gabriel (Conservative Party)
2019	Sandra Moore (Liberal Democrats)	Chris Matthews (Liberal Democrats)	Pete Parrish (Liberal Democrats)

==== Canford Heath East ====
Election	Councillors	
2003	Sandra Moore (Liberal Democrats)	Graham Curtis (Liberal Democrats)
2007	Sandra Moore (Liberal Democrats)	Graham Curtis (Liberal Democrats)
2011	Sandra Moore (Liberal Democrats)	Jennie Hodges (Liberal Democrats)
2015	Sandra Moore (Liberal Democrats)	Jennie Hodges (Liberal Democrats)

==== Canford Heath West ====
Election	Councillors	
2003	Christopher Matthews (Liberal Democrats)	Jeff Allen (Liberal Democrats)
2007	Christopher Matthews (Liberal Democrats)	Jeff Allen (Liberal Democrats)
2011	Christopher Matthews (Liberal Democrats)	Jeff Allen (Liberal Democrats)
2015	Christopher Matthews (Liberal Democrats)	Phil Goodall (Liberal Democrats)
