= Creekmoor (ward) =

Electoral ward in Poole, Dorset, England

- ward Bournemouth, Christchurch and Poole Council
- Boundary of Creekmoor in Bournemouth, Christchurch and Poole.
- Major settlements: Creekmoor; Waterloo

Current ward
- Created: 2019
- Councillor: Paul Slade (Liberal Democrats)
- Councillor: Judy Butt (Poole Engage)
- Created from: Creekmoor
- Number of councillors: 2
- UK Parliament constituency: Poole

Creekmoor is a ward in Poole, Dorset. Since 2019, the ward has elected 2 councillors to Bournemouth, Christchurch and Poole Council.

== History ==
The ward formerly elected three councillors to Poole Borough Council.

== Geography ==
The ward covers the suburbs of Creekmoor and Waterloo.

== Councillors ==
Election	Councillors		
2003	Judy Butt (Conservative)	Leslie Burden (Conservative)	John Rampton (Conservative)
2007	Judy Butt (Conservative)	Leslie Burden (Conservative)	John Rampton (Conservative)
2011	Judy Butt (Conservative)	Leslie Burden (Conservative)	John Rampton (Conservative)
2015	Judy Butt (Conservative)	Leslie Burden (Conservative)	John Rampton (Conservative)
2019	Judy Butt (Conservative)	Diana Butler (UKIP)	Seat Abolished
2023	Judy Butt (Poole Engage Party)	Paul Slade (Liberal Democrats)	Seat Abolished

== Election results ==
=== 2023 ===
2023 Bournemouth, Christchurch and Poole Council election: Creekmoor (2 seats)
Party	Candidate	Votes	%	±%
Poole Engage	Judy Butt	960		
Liberal Democrats	Paul Slade	774		
Liberal Democrats	Paige Stevens	650		
Poole Engage	Sarah Hollis	645		
Conservative	Bob Lister	320		
Conservative	Tony Reeves	299		
Labour	Neil Duncan-Jordan	281		
Green	Diana Tozer	161		
Majority				
Turnout		4,090	29.5%	
Poole Engage gain from Conservative		Swing		
Liberal Democrats gain from UKIP		Swing		

=== 2019 ===
2019 Bournemouth, Christchurch and Poole Council election: Creekmoor (2 seats)
Party	Candidate	Votes	%	±%
Conservative	Judy Butt	877	38.8	
UKIP	Diana Butler	591	26.2	
Conservative	Steve Hayes	584	25.8	
Liberal Democrats	Paul Slade	519	23.0	
Independent	Shaun Connolly	503	22.3	
Liberal Democrats	Trevor Morton	446	19.7	
Green	Wayland Goodliffe	288	12.7	
Labour	Ruby Free	211	9.3	
Majority				
Turnout		2,260	31.26%	
Conservative win (new seat)				
UKIP win (new seat)				

=== 2015 ===
2015 Poole Borough Council election: Creekmoor (3 seats)
Party	Candidate	Votes	%	±%
Conservative	Judy Butt*	2,286		
Conservative	Les Burden*	2,203		
Conservative	John Rampton*	1,742		
UKIP	Gareth Cook	1176		
UKIP	Heather Jones	1041		
Liberal Democrats	Paul Slade	836		
Liberal Democrats	Jack Blankley	750		
Liberal Democrats	Millie Earl	735		
Green	Arron Blake	518		
Green	Marian Bryant	487		
Green	Robin Bryant	418		
Turnout				
Conservative hold		Swing		
Conservative hold		Swing		
Conservative hold		Swing		

=== 2011 ===
2011 Poole Borough Council election: Creekmoor (3 seats)
Party	Candidate	Votes	%	±%
Conservative	Leslie Burden	1,515		
Conservative	Judy Butt	1,487		
Conservative	John Rampton	1,284		
Independent	Siobhan Coleman	720		
UKIP	John Butler	635		
Liberal Democrats	Eleanor Perera	591		
Liberal Democrats	Rory MacKay	587		
Turnout				
Conservative hold		Swing		
Conservative hold		Swing		
Conservative hold		Swing		

=== 2007 ===
2007 Poole Borough Council election: Creekmoor (3 seats)
Party	Candidate	Votes	%	±%
Conservative	Leslie Burden	1,649		
Conservative	John Rampton	1,503		
Conservative	Judy Butt	1,475		
Liberal Democrats	Rory Mackay	788		
Liberal Democrats	Keith Bates	757		
Liberal Democrats	Andrew May	753		
UKIP	John Butler	364		
Turnout		2,556	35.18	
Conservative hold		Swing		
Conservative hold		Swing		
Conservative hold		Swing		
