= Bearwood and Merley =

Electoral ward in Poole, Dorset, England

- ward Bournemouth, Christchurch and Poole Council
- Boundary of Bearwood and Merley in Bournemouth, Christchurch and Poole.
- Local government in South West England: Dorset
- Population: 14,028 (2021 census)
- Major settlements: Bearwood; Merley

Current ward
- Created: 2019
- Councillor: David Brown (Liberal Democrats)
- Councillor: Marcus Andrews (Liberal Democrats)
- Councillor: Richard Burton (Liberal Democrats)
- Created from: Merley and Bearwood (2003-2019)

2003–2019
- Number of councillors: 3
- UK Parliament constituency: Bournemouth West
- UK Parliament constituency: Mid Dorset and North Poole

Bearwood and Merley is a ward in Poole, Dorset. Since 2019, the ward has elected 3 councillors to Bournemouth, Christchurch and Poole Council.

== Demographics ==
Bearwood and Merley
Population	2001	2011	2021
Population	13,532	▼13,516	▲14,028
Geography
Population Density	799.1/km²		
Population Growth	(2011 to 2021)		▲0.37%
Area	17.55 km²		
Ethnicity
White		95.7%	
Asian		1.6%	
Mixed/Other		1.5%	
Black		0.7%	
Country of Birth
United Kingdom		92.3	
European Union		3.5	
Africa		1.6	
Middle East and Asia		1.4	
Other		0.9	
Europe (Other)		0.4	
Religion
Christianity		53.5%	
No Religion		44.1%	

== Geography ==
The ward contains the suburbs of Bearwood and Merley. It primarily covers the area of the similarly named former Poole Borough Council ward of Merley and Bearwood. The ward is divided between the Parliamentary Constituencies of Bournemouth West and Mid Dorset and North Poole.

== Councillors ==
The ward is currently represented by three Liberal Democrat councillors.

Election	Councillors		
2003	Catherine Hives (Conservative Party)	Jane James (Liberal Democrats)	Leo Belcham (Conservative Party)
2007	Peter Maiden (Liberal Democrats)	David Brown (Liberal Democrats)	Daphne Long (Liberal Democrats)
2011	David Brown (Liberal Democrats)	Sandra Cox (Liberal Democrats)	Peter Maiden (Liberal Democrats)
2015	David Brown (Liberal Democrats)	Jane Newell (Conservative Party)	Marion Pope (Conservative Party)
BCP	David Brown (Liberal Democrats)	Marcus Andrews (Liberal Democrats)	Richard Burton (Liberal Democrats)
2019	David Brown (Liberal Democrats)	Marcus Andrews (Liberal Democrats)	Richard Burton (Liberal Democrats)
2023	David Brown (Liberal Democrats)	Marcus Andrews (Liberal Democrats)	Richard Burton (Liberal Democrats)

== Election results ==
=== 2023 ===
Bearwood and Merley
Party	Candidate	Votes	%	±%
Liberal Democrats	David Anthony Brown‡	2,502	67.5	+17.7
Liberal Democrats	Marcus Julian Charles Andrews‡	2,482	67.0	+23.4
Liberal Democrats	Richard Glyn Burton‡	2,414	65.1	+24.0
Conservative	Leona Jayne Allen	744	20.1	−6.9
Conservative	Debbie Ferguson	698	18.8	−3.6
Conservative	Roger Ashton Gregory	691	18.6	−3.6
Green	Alison Randall	403	10.9	+0.5
Labour	Siobhan Helen Bardsley	350	9.4	+4.4
Majority				
Turnout		3,706	33.48	
Liberal Democrats hold		Swing		
Liberal Democrats hold		Swing		
Liberal Democrats hold		Swing		

=== 2019 ===
Bearwood and Merley (3 seats)
Party	Candidate	Votes	%	±%
Liberal Democrats	David Brown	2,115	49.8	
Liberal Democrats	Marcus Andrews	1,850	43.6	
Liberal Democrats	Richard Burton	1,746	41.1	
Independent	Marion Pope	1,456	34.3	
Conservative	Jane Newell	1,148	27.0	
Conservative	Ashley Fraser	949	22.4	
Conservative	Stephen Baker	942	22.2	
Green	Simon Riggs	443	10.4	
Labour	Siobhan Bardsley	213	5.0	
Labour	Gigi Sismaet	193	4.5	
Labour	Moe Phillips	180	4.2	
Majority				
Turnout		4,246	39.70%	
Liberal Democrats win (new seat)				
Liberal Democrats win (new seat)				
Liberal Democrats win (new seat)				

=== 2015 ===
Merley and Bearwood (3 seats)
Party	Candidate	Votes	%	±%
Liberal Democrats	David Brown*	2,579		
Conservative	Jane Newell	2,389		
Conservative	Marion Pope	2,332		
Conservative	Roger Gregory	2284		
Liberal Democrats	Ken Swash	1910		
Liberal Democrats	May Newman	1661		
UKIP	John Butler	1102		
Green	Wayland Goodliffe	458		
Green	Gigi Sismaet	454		
Independent	Peter Kazmierczak	377		
Green	Emmajay Walsh	312		
Turnout				
Liberal Democrats hold		Swing		
Conservative gain from Liberal Democrats		Swing		
Conservative gain from Liberal Democrats		Swing		

=== 2011 ===
Merley and Bearwood (3 seats)
Party	Candidate	Votes	%	±%
Liberal Democrats	David Brown	2,054		
Liberal Democrats	Sandra Cox	2,026		
Liberal Democrats	Peter Maiden	1,976		
Conservative	Bernard Broderick	1,936		
Conservative	Jane Thomas	1,639		
Conservative	Andrew Chard	1,593		
Turnout				
Liberal Democrats hold		Swing		
Liberal Democrats hold		Swing		
Liberal Democrats hold		Swing		

=== 2007 ===
Merley and Bearwood (3 seats)
Party	Candidate	Votes	%	±%
Liberal Democrats	Peter Maiden	2,238		
Liberal Democrats	David Brown	2,227		
Liberal Democrats	Daphne Long	2,036		
Conservative	Katie Hives	1,676		
Conservative	Jonathan Pethen	1,492		
Conservative	Karen Rampton	1,475		
Turnout		3,901	46.81	
Liberal Democrats hold		Swing		
Liberal Democrats gain from Conservative		Swing		
Liberal Democrats gain from Conservative		Swing		

=== 2003 ===
Merley and Bearwood (3 seats)
Party	Candidate	Votes	%	±%
Conservative	Catherine Hives	1,689	51.7	
Liberal Democrats	Jane James	1,581	48.3	
Conservative	Leo Belcham	1,542		
Conservative	Philip Jones	1,519		
Liberal Democrats	Leslie Legg	1,493		
Liberal Democrats	Philip James	1,476		
Turnout				
Conservative win (new seat)				
Liberal Democrats win (new seat)				
Conservative win (new seat)				
