= Penn Hill =

Area of Poole, Dorset, England

Coordinates: 50.7233°N 1.9308°W

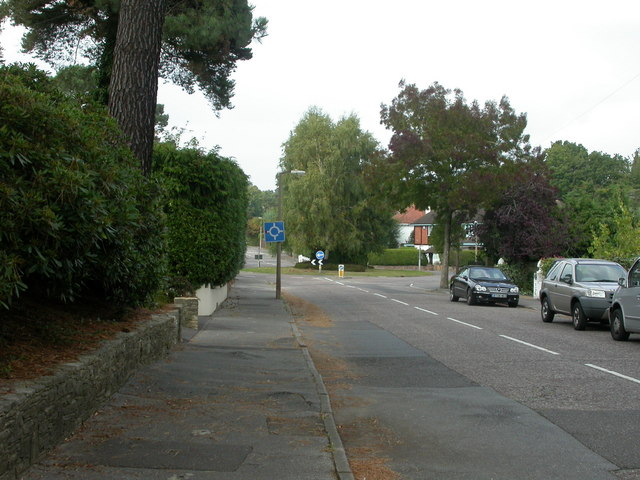
Roundabout in Parkstone, in Penn Hill Ward

Penn Hill is a suburb and electoral ward of Poole in Dorset, England, bordering on Branksome Park, Canford Cliffs, Sandbanks, Lilliput and Parkstone. It is effectively part of Parkstone.

== Demographics ==
At the 2011 census:

- 11,355 people live in Penn Hill.
- There are 4,528 dwellings in the ward.
- 2% of the residents are from minority ethnic groups.
- 26.52% of the people are between the ages of 40 and 59.
- There are 2,947 people over the age of 60 living in this ward.
- 82.53% of residents own their own homes, either outright or with a mortgage.
- 12.50% of residents live in privately rented homes.
- 3.98% of residents live in council or housing association homes.
- 0.99% of residents live completely rent free.
- The population density of Penn Hill is approximately 7604 people per square mile (2936/km^{2}).
- The actual size of the ward is 1.4 square miles (3.6 km^{2}).
- The biggest employers of men in this area (with 17.06% of males) are the real estate business and services industries.
- The biggest employers of women in this area (with 22.28% of females) are the health and social work sectors.

== Politics ==
Boundary of Penn Hill in Bournemouth, Christchurch and Poole.

Since 2019, the ward has elected 2 councillors to Bournemouth, Christchurch and Poole Council. Before 2019, it elected three councillors to Poole Borough Council.

It is in the Poole parliamentary constituency.

=== Councillors ===
Election	Councillors		
2011	Ron Parker (Conservative)	Ron Parker (Conservative)	Xena Dion (Conservative)
2015	Ron Parker (Conservative)	Ron Parker (Conservative)	Xena Dion (Conservative)
2019	Tony O'Neill (Conservative)	Bryan Dion (Conservative)	Two Seats
2023	Jo Clements (Liberal Democrats)	Emily Harman (Liberal Democrats)	Two Seats

=== Election results ===
==== 2023 ====
Penn Hill
Party	Candidate	Votes	%	±%
Liberal Democrats	Jo Clements	1,445	48.5	+13.7
Liberal Democrats	Oliver John Walters	1,196	40.2	+8.7
Conservative	Remy John Aquilina	851	28.6	−6.6
Conservative	Tony O’Neill‡	735	24.7	−14.9
Poole Engage	Sophie-Julienne Burnett	413	13.9	N/A
Labour	Jake Oliver Ruggier	382	12.8	−2.8
Poole Engage	Nathelie Anna Tudberry	353	11.9	N/A
Green	Helen Joanna Nicol	294	9.9	−16.3
Majority		2,978	34.24	
Turnout				
Liberal Democrats gain from Conservative		Swing		
Liberal Democrats gain from Conservative		Swing		

==== 2019 ====
Penn Hill (2 seats)
Party	Candidate	Votes	%	±%
Conservative	Tony O'Neill	1,157	39.6	
Conservative	Bryan Dion	1,030	35.2	
Liberal Democrats	Brian Clements	1,016	34.8	
Liberal Democrats	Rich Douglas	920	31.5	
Green	Hannah Macklin	766	26.2	
Labour	Mini Kingman	455	15.6	
Majority				
Turnout		2,922	34.86	
Conservative win (new seat)				
Conservative win (new seat)				

==== 2015 ====
Penn Hill (3 seats)
Party	Candidate	Votes	%	±%
Conservative	Elaine Atkinson*	2,498		
Conservative	Ron Parker*	2,198		
Conservative	Xena Dion*	2,131		
Poole People	Sally Carpenter	1362		
Poole People	Nicola Jinks	1039		
Liberal Democrats	Robin Rennison	801		
Labour	Martin Holst	752		
Green	Simon Card	745		
UKIP	David Darling	717		
UKIP	Lyn Thomas	695		
Green	Julie Millar	651		
Green	Philip Mayer	437		
Turnout				
Conservative hold		Swing		
Conservative hold		Swing		
Conservative hold		Swing		

==== 2011 ====
Penn Hill (3 seats)
Party	Candidate	Votes	%	±%
Conservative	Elaine Atkinson	1,929		
Conservative	Xena Dion	1,929		
Conservative	Ronald Parker	1,771		
Poole People	Peter Miles	1,431		
Liberal Democrats	Roy Parker	843		
UKIP	Jack Edwards	514		
Turnout				
Conservative hold		Swing		
Conservative hold		Swing		
Conservative hold		Swing		
