= Canford Cliffs (ward) =

Ward of Poole, Dorset, England

- ward Bournemouth, Christchurch and Poole Council
- Boundary of Canford Cliffs in Bournemouth, Christchurch and Poole.
- Major settlements: Canford Cliffs Sandbanks

Current ward
- Created: 2019
- Councillor: Gavin Wright (Conservative)
- Councillor: John Challinor (Conservative)

2003–2019
- Number of councillors: 3

Canford Cliffs is a ward of Poole, Dorset. Since the 2019 local government elections, the ward has elected 2 councillors to Bournemouth, Christchurch and Poole Council.

== History ==
The ward was formerly used for elections to Poole Borough Council, which it elected three councillors.

== Geography ==
The ward covers the Canford Cliffs and Sandbanks areas of Poole. It is divided between the Bournemouth West and Poole constituencies for General Elections.

== Councillors ==
Election	Councillors		
2003	Ray Smith (Conservative)	Niel Sorton (Conservative)	Carol Deas (Conservative)
2007	May Haines (Conservative)	Niel Sorton (Conservative)	Carol Deas (Conservative)
2011	May Haines (Conservative)	Niel Sorton (Conservative)	Peter Pawlowski (Conservative)
2015	May Haines (Conservative)	Mohan Iyengar (Conservative) (Poole Local Group: 2022)	Peter Pawlowski (Conservative)
2019	May Haines (Conservative)	Mohan Iyengar (Conservative) (Poole Local Group: 2022)	Seat Abolished
2023	May Haines (Conservative)	John Ernest Challinor (Conservative)	Seat Abolished
2024	Gavin Wright (Conservative)	John Ernest Challinor (Conservative)	Seat Abolished

== Election results ==
=== 2024 by-election ===
In 2024 councillor May Haines resigned after 17 years. A by-election will be held on 2 May 2024 alongside nationwide local elections.

It was held by the Conservatives with a large majority. 31 votes were rejected.

Canford Cliffs by-election
Party	Candidate	Votes	%	±%
Conservative	Gavin Wright	1,720	62.0	
Liberal Democrats	Ray Sparrow	573	20.7	
Labour	Jim Buchanan	317	11.4	
Green	Johnny Tutton	163	5.9	'
Majority		1,147	41.3	
Turnout		2,804	35.41	
Conservative hold		Swing		

=== 2023 ===
Canford Cliffs
Party	Candidate	Votes	%	±%
Conservative	May Yuen Haines‡	1,711	56.4	−5.5
Conservative	John Ernest Challinor	1,680	55.4	−2.2
Liberal Democrats	Ray Sparrow	620	20.4	+3.1
Liberal Democrats	Rich Douglas	513	16.9	+5.3
Labour	Jim Buchanan	291	9.6	+3.8
Green	Johnny Tutton	267	8.8	N/A
Poole Engage	Sheridan Burnett	261	8.6	N/A
Poole Engage	Sharala Lowe	235	7.7	N/A
Independent	Peter George Pawlowski	161	5.3	−13.8
Majority				
Turnout		3,034	37.99	
Conservative hold		Swing		
Conservative hold		Swing		

=== 2019 ===
Canford Cliffs (2 seats)
Party	Candidate	Votes	%	±%
Conservative	May Haines	1,990	61.9	
Conservative	Mohan Iyengar	1,851	57.6	
Independent	Peter Pawlowski	615	19.1	
Independent	David Young	555	17.3	
Liberal Democrats	Robin Rennison	555	17.3	
Liberal Democrats	Dave Yates	372	11.6	
Labour	Martin Holst	185	5.8	
Majority				
Turnout		3,214	40.58%	
Conservative win (new seat)				
Conservative win (new seat)				

=== 2015 ===
2015 Poole Borough Council election: Canford Cliffs (3 seats)
Party	Candidate	Votes	%	±%
Conservative	May Haines*	3,658		
Conservative	Peter Pawlowski*	3,546		
Conservative	Mohan Iyengar	3,134		
UKIP	Jacqueline Bigwood	880		
UKIP	Geoff Chidley	876		
Liberal Democrats	Michael Baker	827		
Green	Kate Rose	539		
Labour	Peter Kenyon	376		
Green	Martin Davies	348		
Labour	Kenneth May	334		
Green	Helen Thomas	306		
Turnout				
Conservative hold		Swing		
Conservative hold		Swing		
Conservative hold		Swing		

=== 2011 ===
2011 Poole Borough Council election: Canford Cliffs (3 seats)
Party	Candidate	Votes	%	±%
Conservative	May Haines	1,854		
Conservative	Niel Sorton	1,658		
Conservative	Peter Pawlowski	1,626		
Independent	Carole Deas	1,464		
Independent	Susanna Carvell	989		
Independent	Ian Walker	783		
Liberal Democrats	Michael Baker	447		
UKIP	Avril King	321		
Turnout				
Conservative hold		Swing		
Conservative hold		Swing		
Conservative gain from Independent		Swing		

=== 2007 ===
2007 Poole Borough Council election: Canford Cliffs (3 seats)
Party	Candidate	Votes	%	±%
Conservative	Carol Deas	2,610		
Conservative	May Haines	2,414		
Conservative	Niel Sorton	2,263		
Liberal Democrats	Robin Rennison	508		
UKIP	John Haywood	420		
Turnout		3,119	43.27	
Conservative hold		Swing		
Conservative hold		Swing		
Conservative hold		Swing		
