= Oakdale (ward) =

Electoral ward

Boundary of Oakdale in Bournemouth, Christchurch and Poole.

Oakdale is an electoral ward in Poole, Dorset. Since 2019, the ward has elected 2 councillors to Bournemouth, Christchurch and Poole Council.

== History ==
The ward formerly elected three councillors to Poole Borough Council. Janet Walton was elected Mayor of Poole in 2015.

== Geography ==
The ward covers the suburb of the same name, as well as Stanley Green.

== Councillors ==
Election	Councillors		
2011	Peter Adams (Conservative)	Ian Potter (Conservative)	Janet Walton (Conservative)
2015	Peter Adams (Conservative)	Ian Potter (Conservative)	Janet Walton (Conservative)
2019	Peter Miles (Poole People)	Felicity Rice (Alliance for Local Living)	Two Seats
2023	Peter Miles (Poole People)	Felicity Rice (Poole People)	Two Seats

== Election result ==
=== 2023 ===
Oakdale
Party	Candidate	Votes	%	±%
Poole People	Felicity Joy Rice (Note: Elected as Alliance for Local Living.)	987	40.6	+0.2
Poole People	Peter Francis Miles	914	37.6	−13.2
Poole Engage	Steve Hayes	460	18.9	N/A
Conservative	Sunil Kumar	446	18.4	−6.9
Conservative	Simon Peter Hollosi	435	17.9	−1.1
Labour	Alan Albert Daniels	415	17.1	+6.5
Poole Engage	Marie Patricia Pethen	363	14.9	N/A
Liberal Democrats	Molly Charlotte Slade	323	13.3	+1.2
Liberal Democrats	David Herbert Brandwood	309	12.7	+1.1
Majority				
Turnout		2,430	29.08	
Poole People hold		Swing		
Poole People gain from ALL		Swing		

=== 2019 ===
2019 Bournemouth, Christchurch and Poole Council election: Oakdale (2 seats)
Party	Candidate	Votes	%	±%
Poole People	Peter Miles	1,406		
ALL	Felicity Rice	1,119		
Conservative	Ian Potter	701		
Conservative	Janet Walton	527		
UKIP	Janice Long	421		
Liberal Democrats	Sean Perrin	334		
Liberal Democrats	Tansy Earl	321		
Labour	Ian Aitkenhead	294		
Majority				
Turnout				
Poole People win (new seat)				
ALL win (new seat)				

=== 2015 ===
2015 Poole Borough Council election: Oakdale (3 seats)
Party	Candidate	Votes	%	±%
Conservative	Peter Adams*	2,080		
Conservative	Ian Potter*	2,051		
Conservative	Janet Walton*	1,725		
UKIP	Janice Long	1335		
UKIP	Larry Adams	1325		
Poole People	Hugh Todd	1124		
Liberal Democrats	Tansy Earl	851		
Labour	Brian Ellis	830		
Liberal Democrats	Ems Simpson	641		
Green	Ben Skipp	585		
Green	Richard Turner	506		
Green	Christopher Welch	452		
Turnout				
Conservative hold		Swing		
Conservative hold		Swing		
Conservative hold		Swing		

=== 2011 ===
2011 Poole Borough Council election: Oakdale (3 seats)
Party	Candidate	Votes	%	±%
Conservative	Ian Potter	1,264		
Conservative	Peter Adams	1,262		
Conservative	Janet Walton	1,129		
Poole People	Andy Hadley	978		
Poole People	Hugh Todd	770		
Independent	David Gillard	682		
Labour	Brian Ellis	556		
Liberal Democrats	Larry Adams	525		
Independent	Linda Gillard	464		
Labour	Sue Mallory	445		
Liberal Democrats	Alan Brooker	436		
Liberal Democrats	David Chicken	430		
Labour	Andrei Dudau	415		
UKIP	Michael Fisher	377		
Independent	Karl Ingham	371		
Turnout				
Conservative hold		Swing		
Conservative hold		Swing		
Conservative gain from Independent		Swing		
