= Poole Borough Council elections =

Local government elections in Dorset, England

Poole was a unitary authority in Dorset, England from 1997 to 2019. From 1974 until 1 April 1997 it was a non-metropolitan district. In 2019 it was abolished and subsumed into Bournemouth, Christchurch and Poole Council.

== Political control ==
The first election to the council was held in 1973, ahead of the local government reorganisation coming into effect the following year. From 1973 until the council's abolition in 2019 political control of the council was held by the following parties:

Lower tier non-metropolitan district

Party in control	Years
Conservative	1973–1991
Liberal Democrats	1991–1997

Unitary authority

Party in control	Years
Liberal Democrats	1997–1999
No overall control	1999–2003
Conservative	2003–2011
No overall control	2011–2015
Conservative	2015–2019

=== Leadership ===
The role of mayor was largely ceremonial at Poole Borough Council. Political leadership was instead provided by the leader of the council. The leaders from 2003 until the council's abolition in 2019 were:

Councillor	Party	From	To
Brian Leverett	Conservative	20 May 2003	17 Sep 2010
Elaine Atkinson	Conservative	26 Oct 2010	May 2015
Janet Walton	Conservative	20 May 2015	31 Mar 2019

== Council elections ==
=== Non-metropolitan district elections ===
- 1973 Poole Borough Council election
- 1976 Poole Borough Council election
- 1979 Poole Borough Council election
- 1983 Poole Borough Council election (New ward boundaries)
- 1987 Poole Borough Council election
- 1991 Poole Borough Council election

=== Unitary authority elections ===
- 1996 Poole Borough Council election
- 1999 Poole Borough Council election
- 2003 Poole Borough Council election (New ward boundaries increased the number of seats by three)
- 2007 Poole Borough Council election
- 2011 Poole Borough Council election
- 2015 Poole Borough Council election (New ward boundaries)

== Council composition ==
Year	Conservative	Liberal Democrats	Labour	Poole People	UKIP	Council control after election
1999	17	19	3	0	0	No overall control
2003	26	16	0	0	0	Conservative
2007	25	17	0	0	0	Conservative
2011	21	18	0	3	0	Conservative
2015	32	6	0	3	1	Conservative

== Borough result maps ==
2003 results map

2007 results map

2011 results map

2015 results map

== By-election results ==
=== 1999-2003 ===
Canford Heath By-Election 28 September 2000 (2 vacancies)
Party	Candidate	Votes	%	±%
Liberal Democrats	Sandra Moore	1,825		
Liberal Democrats	Jeff Allen	1,747		
Conservative	Peter Bowler	1,649		
Conservative	Roy Oakton	1,645		
Labour	George Inglis	216		
Labour	Paul Westbrook-Merry	177		
Turnout		7,259	33.5	
Liberal Democrats hold		Swing		
Liberal Democrats hold		Swing		

Resignation of Cllr Andrew Muspratt and Cllr Marian Mackenzie

=== 2003-2007 ===
Alderney By-Election 18 March 2004
Party	Candidate	Votes	%	±%
Liberal Democrats	Lindsay Wilson	1,392	58.4	+11.4
Conservative	Wendy Herring	527	22.1	−13.7
Labour	Philip Murray	327	13.7	−0.7
Independent	Nicholas Tapping	77	3.2	+3.2
Independent	Doreen Renphrey	61	2.6	+2.6
Majority		825	36.3	
Turnout		2,384	30.3	
Liberal Democrats hold		Swing		

Resignation of Cllr Bob Dugdale

=== 2007-2011 ===
Branksome East By-Election 15 May 2008
Party	Candidate	Votes	%	±%
Conservative	Karen Rampton	923	55.2	+4.7
Liberal Democrats	Matthew Gillett	750	44.8	+26.0
Majority		173	10.4	
Turnout		1,673	35.0	
Conservative hold		Swing		

Death of Cllr Mary Hillman

Broadstone By-Election 6 May 2010
Party	Candidate	Votes	%	±%
Liberal Democrats	Jo Clements	809	48.3	−4.1
Conservative	Tony Reeves	481	28.7	−7.7
Labour	Tony Reeves	205	12.2	+12.2
UKIP	Diana Butler	114	6.8	+0.8
BNP	William Kimmet	66	3.9	+3.9
Majority		328	19.6	
Turnout		1,675		
Liberal Democrats hold		Swing		

Resignation of Cllr Daniel Martin

Newtown By-Election 9 September 2010
Party	Candidate	Votes	%	±%
Liberal Democrats	Jo Clements	809		
Conservative	Tony Reeves	481		
Labour	Jason Sanderson	205		
UKIP	Diana Butler	114		
BNP	William Kimmet	66		
Majority		328		
Turnout			17.86	
Liberal Democrats hold		Swing		

Resignation of Cllr Michael Plummer

Poole Town By-Election 2 December 2010
Party	Candidate	Votes	%	±%
Poole People	Mark Howell	463		
Conservative	Tony Reeves	438		
Liberal Democrats	Peter England	213		
Labour	Jason Sanderson	201		
UKIP	Avril King	55		
BNP	William Kimmet	32		
Majority		25		
Turnout			17.37	
Poole People gain from Conservative		Swing		

Death of Cllr Brian Leverett

=== 2011-2015 ===
Branksome East By-Election 15 November 2012
Party	Candidate	Votes	%	±%
Conservative	Jane Thomas	553		
Liberal Democrats	Jenny Paton	254		
Poole People	Peter Portnoi	245		
UKIP	Diana Mary Butler	132		
Labour	Hazel Malcom-Walker	104		
BNP	William Kimmet	28		
Majority		199		
Turnout			27.58	
Conservative hold		Swing		

Resignation of Cllr Stephen Rollo-Smith.

=== 2015-2019 ===
Broadstone By-Election 13 October 2016
Party	Candidate	Votes	%	±%
Liberal Democrats	Vikki Slade	2,184		
Conservative	Marc Ujvari	733		
UKIP	Alan Gerring	121		
Green	Mark Chivers	57		
Labour	Jason Sanderson	45		
Majority		1,451		
Turnout			37.23	
Liberal Democrats gain from Conservative		Swing		

Resignation of Cllr Joanne Tomlin.
