= Mannings Heath, Dorset =

Suburb of Poole, Dorset, England

Mannings Heath
- suburb
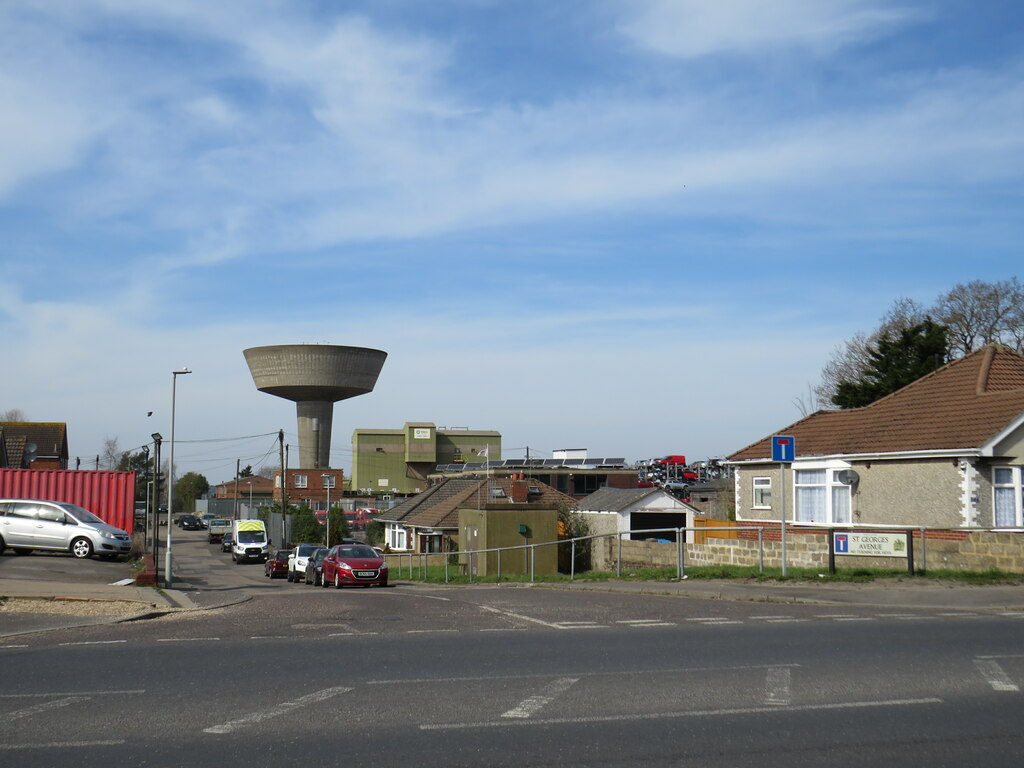
- St George's Avenue, Mannings Heath
- Unitary authority: Bournemouth, Christchurch and Poole
- Region: South West
- Country: England
- Sovereign state: United Kingdom
- Post town: BOURNEMOUTH
- Postcode district: BH
- UK Parliament: Poole; Bournemouth West

Mannings Heath is an industrial district of Poole, Dorset. Mannings Heath is bordered by Alderney, Canford Heath and Newtown.

== Transport ==
The A348 road connects to the industrial estates. The Mannings Heath roundabout is a major junction at the A3049 road.

== Places ==
- Tower Park

== Governance ==
Mannings Heath is part of Canford Heath ward for elections to Bournemouth, Christchurch and Poole Council.

Mannings Heath is split between the Bournemouth West and Poole parliamentary constituency.

== See also ==
- List of places in Dorset
