= Knighton Heath =

Coordinates: 50°45′28″N 1°55′51″W

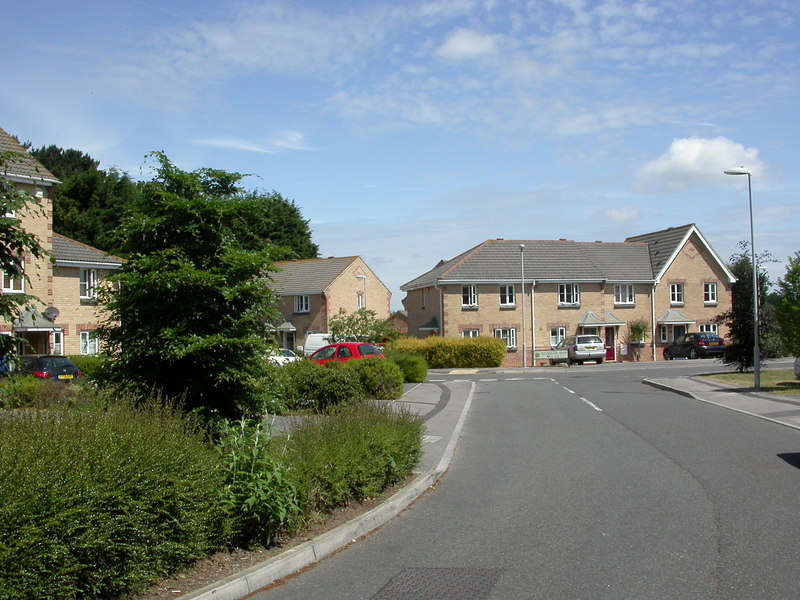
- Autumn Road, Knighton Heath

- Location within Dorset
- OS grid reference: SZ128952
- Unitary authority: Bournemouth, Christchurch and Poole
- Ceremonial county: Dorset
- Region: South West
- Country: England
- Sovereign state: United Kingdom
- Post town: BOURNEMOUTH
- Postcode district: BH11
- Dialling code: 01202
- Police: Dorset
- Fire: Dorset and Wiltshire
- Ambulance: South Western
- UK Parliament: Bournemouth West Mid Dorset and North Poole

Knighton Heath is an area of Bournemouth, Dorset in England. Knighton Heath is south of Bearwood, west of Wallisdown and West Howe, and north of Alderney.

== Facilities ==
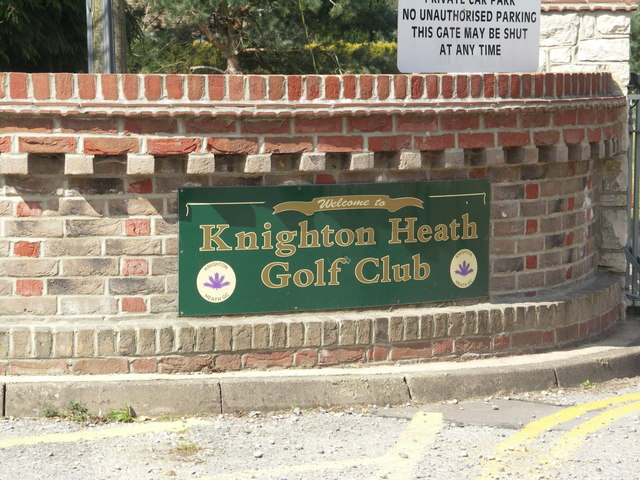
Knighton Heath Golf Club

Knighton Heath is home to a golf club, an industrial estate and Bournemouth Water. In May 2020, the golf course was set on fire.

== Politics ==
Knighton Heath is part of the Bournemouth West parliamentary constituency.
