= Poole Town (ward) =

UK electoral ward

Boundary of Poole Town in Bournemouth, Christchurch and Poole.

Poole Town is an electoral ward in Poole, Dorset. Since 2019, the ward has elected 2 councillors to Bournemouth, Christchurch and Poole Council.

== History ==
The ward formerly elected three councillors to Poole Borough Council.

== Geography ==
The ward covers Poole Town Centre, Longfleet and Baiter Park.

== Councillors ==
Two from the Poole People Party, one from the Labour Party.

== Election results ==
=== 2023 ===
Poole Town
Party	Candidate	Votes	%	±%
Poole People	Andy Hadley‡	933	33.0	−14.6
Poole People	Mark Edward Howell‡	925	32.7	−15.2
Labour	Sue Aitkenhead	841	29.7	+7.4
Conservative	Gavin Scott Wright	709	25.0	+5.1
Conservative	Leanne Barnes	705	24.9	+5.6
Poole People	Charmaine Cassandra Parkinson	701	24.8	−21.5
Conservative	Sarah Therese O’Connell	672	23.7	+4.8
Green	Leo Jon Butterworth	419	14.8	N/A
Liberal Democrats	Katharine Anne Palfrey	406	14.3	+4.5
Poole Engage	Christopher James Bulteel	335	11.8	N/A
Poole Engage	Dave Butt	310	11.0	N/A
Liberal Democrats	Mark Andrew Robson	309	10.9	+3.3
Liberal Democrats	Abbi Carolyn Slade	304	10.7	+4.4
Poole Engage	Ian Leslie Davies	251	8.9	N/A
Majority				
Turnout		2,831	28.44	
Poole People hold		Swing		
Poole People hold		Swing		
Labour gain from Poole People		Swing		

=== 2019 ===
Poole Town (3 seats)
Party	Candidate	Votes	%	±%
Poole People	Mark Howell	1,603	47.9	
Poole People	Andy Hadley	1,593	47.6	
Poole People	L-J Evans	1,551	46.3	
Labour	Sue Aitkenhead	748	22.3	
Conservative	Andy Garner-Watts	666	19.9	
Labour	Andy Proctor	664	19.8	
Labour	Philippa Connolly	647	19.3	
Conservative	Xena Dion	647	19.3	
Conservative	Tom Lintern-Mole	632	18.9	
Liberal Democrats	Jon Cox	328	9.8	
Liberal Democrats	Tim Joyce	253	7.6	
Liberal Democrats	Quenten Walker	211	6.3	
Independent	Simon Lane	76	2.3	
Independent	William Kimmet	71	2.1	
Majority				
Turnout		3,348	33.41%	
Poole People win (new seat)				
Poole People win (new seat)				
Poole People win (new seat)				
