= South Coast Metropole =

English local government association

The South Coast Metropole, established in 1993, is a loose union of local authorities on England's south coast, designed to promote their common interests. The association currently consists of the councils of:

- Poole (Poole Borough Council)
- Bournemouth (Bournemouth Borough Council)
- Southampton (Southampton City Council)
- Portsmouth (Portsmouth City Council)
- Isle of Wight (Isle of Wight Council)
