= Richard Scott (cricketer) =

English cricketer and coach

Personal information
- Full name: Richard John Scott
- Born: 2 November 1963 (age 63); Bournemouth, England
- Nickname: Gazza, Scotty-Boy
- Height: 5 ft 11 in (1.80 m)
- Batting: Left-handed
- Bowling: Right-arm medium

Domestic team information
- Years: Team
- 1983–1985: Dorset
- 1986–1990: Hampshire
- 1986–1990: Gloucestershire
- 1995–1998: Dorset

Career statistics
Competition	FC	LA
Matches	72	97
Runs scored	2,719	2,019
Batting average	23.85	25.88
100s/50s	3/13	1/11
Top score	127	166*
Balls bowled	3,623	2,347
Wickets	43	50
Bowling average	47.23	34.18
5 wickets in innings	–	–
10 wickets in match	–	–
Best bowling	3/43	4/22
Catches/stumpings	34/–	11/–
- Source: Cricinfo, 12 December 2009

Richard John Scott (born 2 November 1963) is an English cricket coach and retired first-class cricketer. He was born at Bournemouth (then in Hampshire, now Dorset).

He represented Dorset, Hampshire and Gloucestershire before coaching Dorset and Middlesex (2009–2018).

== Biography ==
Scott was a left-handed batsman and a right-arm medium pace bowler. He started his playing career at Dorset, playing for them in the Minor Counties Championship. In 1983 he made his List-A for the county against Essex. At the end of the 1985 Minor Counties season Scott left Dorset to join Hampshire.

Scott made his one-day debut in the 1986 County Championship for the club. Over the next two seasons he was used for one-day cricket, but in 1988 he made his first-class debut against Oxford University. Scott spent next five seasons at the club, representing it in 27 first-class and 38 one-day matches. At the end of the 1990 County Championship season Scott left the club and signed for Gloucestershire for the 1991 season.

Scott made his debut for Gloucestershire in the 1991 County Championship. He made his debut for the club in first-class cricket against Worcestershire and in one-day cricket against Middlesex. Scott would spend three seasons with Gloucestershire playing 45 first-class and 56 one-day matches. At the end of the 1993 County Championship he was released by Gloucestershire.

In 1994 Scott re-signed for his first county club, Dorset. Scott represented them in the Minor Counties Championship and in two one-day matches, the last of which came against another of his former clubs, Hampshire in the 1998 NatWest Trophy. At the end of the 1998 season Scott retired from the game aged 34.

In 2007 he returned at the age of 43 to play for Dorset in a single Minor Counties Championship match against Shropshire. He made nine runs before being caught off the bowling of Jack Shantry.

During his spell as Director of Cricket for Dorset, Scott also ran numerous cricket camps for youngsters under the brand "For Six", part of his company portfolio that also included selling his own branded "Dog" and "Puppy Dog" cricket bats made by Hunts and providing whites for local cricket teams. The cricket camps ran during the school holidays, with Bournemouth Cricket Club hosting the summer events, and venues such as Canford School, Ashdown Technology College and Oakmeeds Community College hosting indoor events.

After a spell as Director of Cricket for Dorset, he was appointed by Middlesex as their 2nd XI Coach in 2007. He was subsequently promoted to County Coach in 2009 following a temporary position after the departure of Toby Radford.

He led Middlesex to the Second Division Championship in 2011 and the Specsavers County Championship in 2016.

His departure was announced in July 2018 with Richard Johnson being appointed interim coach until the end of the season.

As of 2024 he is Head of Cricket at Bryanston School.
