= Hamworthy (ward) =

Electoral ward in Poole, Dorset, England

- ward Bournemouth, Christchurch and Poole Council
- Boundary of Hamworthy in Bournemouth, Christchurch and Poole.
- Major settlements: Hamworthy; Upton

Current ward
- Created: 2019
- Councillor: Brian Hitchcock (Poole People)
- Councillor: Julie Bagwell (Poole Engage)
- Councillor: Peter Cooper (Labour)
- Created from: Hamworthy East; Hamworthy West
- UK Parliament constituency: Bournemouth East

Hamworthy is a ward in Poole, Dorset. Since 2019, the ward has elected 3 councillors to Bournemouth, Christchurch and Poole Council.

== History ==
The Hamworthy area was formerly part of two wards on Poole Borough Council; Hamworthy East and Hamworthy West. The wards were merged due to the 2019 structural changes to local government in England with the abolition of Poole Borough Council and the new creation of Bournemouth, Christchurch and Poole Council.

== Geography ==
The ward covers the suburb of Hamworthy, up to the border with Upton. The ward is geographically in the far west of the conurbation.

== Councillors ==
| Election | Councillors | | |
|---|---|---|---|
| 2019 | Julie Bagwell (Poole People Party) | Daniel Butt (Poole People Party) | Mike White (Conservative) |
| 2019 | Julie Bagwell (Independent) | Daniel Butt (Independent) | Mike White (Conservative) |
| 2020 | Julie Bagwell (Independent) | Daniel Butt (Conservative) (Poole Engage Party) | Mike White (Conservative) |
| 2022 | Julie Bagwell (Poole Engage Party) | Daniel Butt (Conservative) (Poole Engage Party) | Mike White (Conservative) |
| 2023 | Julie Bagwell (Poole Engage Party) | Brian Hitchcock (Poole People Party) | Peter Cooper (Labour) |

== Election results ==
=== 2023 ===
Hamworthy
| Party | Candidate | Votes | % | ±% |
|---|---|---|---|---|
| Poole People | Brian Hitchcock | 849 | 33.5 | −18.1 |
| Poole Engage | Julie Bagwell‡ (Note: Elected as Poole People, formed Poole Engage in June 2022) | 759 | 30.0 | −21.6 |
| Labour | Peter Jonathan Cooper | 720 | 28.4 | +14.0 |
| Conservative | Mike White‡ | 656 | 25.9 | +1.3 |
| Poole Engage | Daniel James Butt‡ (Note: Elected as Poole People, formed Poole Engage in June 2022) | 630 | 24.9 | −20.0 |
| Conservative | Mike Wilkins | 593 | 23.4 | +0.3 |
| Liberal Democrats | Steve Robinson | 492 | 19.4 | +12.3 |
| Conservative | Janet Mary Walton | 478 | 18.9 | −0.4 |
| Poole Engage | Mohan Iyengar (Note: Incumbent councillor for Canford Cliffs; elected as Conservative, formed Poole Engage in June 2022) | 463 | 18.3 | N/A |
| Liberal Democrats | Jude Chapman | 385 | 15.2 | +9.0 |
| Green | Yasmine Leila Osbourne | 367 | 14.5 | −0.1 |
| Liberal Democrats | David Chapman | 333 | 13.1 | +7.9 |
| Majority | | | | |
| Turnout | | 2,534 | 24.25 | |
| Poole People hold | | Swing | | |
| Poole Engage gain from Poole People | | Swing | | |
| Labour gain from Conservative | | Swing | | |

=== 2019 ===
Hamworthy (3 seats)
| Party | Candidate | Votes | % | ±% |
|---|---|---|---|---|
| Poole People | Julie Bagwell | 1,621 | 51.6 | |
| Poole People | Daniel Butt | 1,411 | 44.9 | |
| Conservative | Mike White | 773 | 24.6 | |
| Conservative | Mike Wilkins | 725 | 23.1 | |
| UKIP | John Butler | 638 | 20.3 | |
| Conservative | Vishal Gupta | 606 | 19.3 | |
| Green | Ian Hay | 460 | 14.6 | |
| Labour | Sarah Ward | 453 | 14.4 | |
| Labour | Jim Buchanan | 436 | 13.9 | |
| Labour | Neil Duncan-Jordan | 408 | 13.0 | |
| Liberal Democrats | Peter Sidaway | 224 | 7.1 | |
| Liberal Democrats | David Chicken | 196 | 6.2 | |
| Liberal Democrats | Declan Stones | 162 | 5.2 | |
| Majority | | | | |
| Turnout | | 3,144 | 30.43% | |
| Poole People win (new seat) | | | | |
| Poole People win (new seat) | | | | |
| Conservative win (new seat) | | | | |
