= Bearwood =

Bearwood may refer to:

- Bearwood House, a country house in Berkshire, England
  - Reddam House, Berkshire formerly known as Bearwood College, an independent school located in Bearwood House in Berkshire, England
- Bearwood, Dorset, a suburb of Poole, England
- Bearwood and Lower Bearwood, hamlets in the civil parish of Pembridge in Herefordshire, England
- Bearwood, West Midlands, England
