= Magna Academy =

Coordinates: 50°44′54″N 1°57′56″W

Location
- Ashdown Close; Canford Heath; Poole, Dorset, BH17 8RE; England

Information
- Type: Academy
- Established: 1989
- Local authority: Bournemouth, Christchurch and Poole
- Department for Education URN: 139711 Tables
- Ofsted: Reports
- Principal: Phil Midworth
- Gender: Co-educational
- Age: 11 to 18
- Enrolment: 877
- Colours: Blue/Grey/Cyan
- Website: https://www.magna-aspirations.org/

Magna Academy is a co-educational secondary school and sixth form located on Canford Heath area of Poole in the English county of Dorset.

== History ==
=== 1989 to 2001: Ashdown School ===
The school was first opened as Ashdown School on 7 July 1989 following the merger of Ashley Cross Girls School and Seldown Boys School. The name 'Ashdown' is a combination of the two previous school names. The construction of Ashdown School began in 1986 in a large field in Canford Heath, Poole, Dorset.

During construction, a time capsule was placed somewhere within the brick walls, the capsule being removed from its previous location in Seldown Boys School. Fifty ash trees were planted around the border of the school's field, to represent the school's new name. On 7 July 1989, the new Ashdown School was opened by Princess Margaret and headteacher Mollie Snell. Six hundred students attended the opening of the school.

In 1990, Snell retired from her post as headteacher. Ashley Pellegrini, previously deputy headteacher of Mellow Lane Comprehensive School in Hayes, Middlesex, became the new head.

In 1995, the Charter Mark Award was given to Ashdown for Excellence in Public Service. On 7 October 1997, two arsonists set fire to the school overnight, closing the school for a year. Parts of the building were badly damaged and the music room destroyed. New facilities were constructed in 1999, with a new music room and five new classrooms added. The school received a second Charter Mark Award in 1998.

In 2000, the school was presented a DfES School Improvement Award.

=== 2000 to 2013: Ashdown Technology College ===
In 2001, under the DfES specialist schools programme, Ashdown became a Technology College and changed its name to Ashdown Technology College. New technology is added in several classrooms, including interactive whiteboards.

In 2005 Ashdown was recognised by the Specialist Schools Trust as one of the "Most Improved" and "Best Added Value" Schools in the country. The DfES also designated Ashdown as a High Performing Specialist School. Near the end of the school term, In 2006 Ashdown was redesignated as a Technology College with Vocational Learning added to its specialisms. A Sixth Form was introduced. Headteacher Pellegrini was replaced in 2007 by Liz Jones.

In 2012 Ashdown Technology College was placed in special measures after Ofsted assessed the school as "inadequate" for overall effectiveness.

=== 2013 onwards: Magna Academy ===
Previously a community school administered by Poole Borough Council, in September 2013 Ashdown Technology College converted to academy status and was renamed Magna Academy. The school is now sponsored by the Aspirations Trust.

In 2015, the academy underwent its first Ofsted inspection. It gained an Outstanding rating, the highest award the inspector can give to a school. In September 2015, the academy received national media attention after it removed students from classes for having incorrectly sized classroom equipment.

An Ofted inspection in December 2018 again rated the academy Outstanding, endorsing its polarising silent corridors policy. Students were expected to transition between classrooms in silence, arriving at their next lesson calm and ready to work. The policy was also a reaction to the commonly held belief among educators that most bullying at school occurs in the transitions between lessons. According to the report that followed its inspection, Principal Richard Tutt stated that "some of our students have come from schools where they had been subjected to verbal and physical aggression in transitions."

In the summer of 2019, Richard Tutt left the academy to pursue a new role with a competitor Trust. After a term under interim management, the academy appointed Natasha Ullah as Principal. Ms Ullah joined the school from the Thomas Hardye School in Dorchester. She is the first BAME headteacher to be appointed on England's South Coast.

In the wake of the unfolding COVID-19 pandemic, Magna Academy was obliged to temporarily close its doors to students from 20 March 2020. Its early and rapid preparation for closure allowed it to launch a Virtual School on its website at the point of closure.
