= Newtown, Dorset =

Suburb of Poole, Dorset, England

Coordinates: 50.741°N 1.948°W

Newtown
- suburb
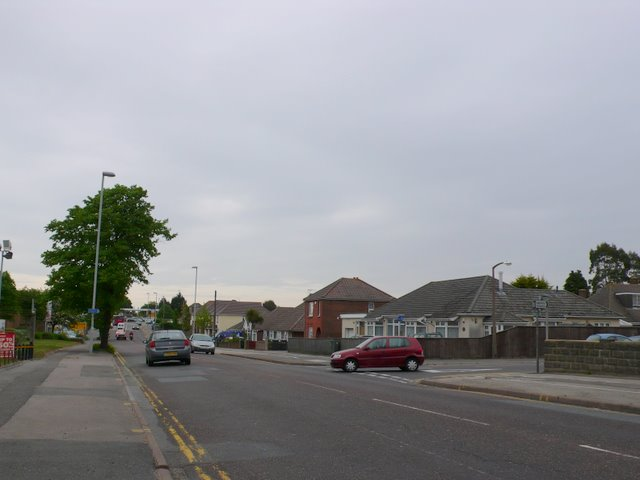
- Ringwood Road, Newtown
- Population: 12,515
- Unitary authority: Bournemouth, Christchurch and Poole
- Region: South West
- Country: England
- Sovereign state: United Kingdom
- Post town: BOURNEMOUTH
- Postcode district: BH
- UK Parliament: Poole

Newtown is a suburb of the town of Poole in Dorset, England. It was formerly an electoral ward, which had a population 12,515 at the 2011 census. Newtown is located near to the suburbs of Alderney, Alder Hills, Parkstone, Oakdale and Rossmore.

== History ==
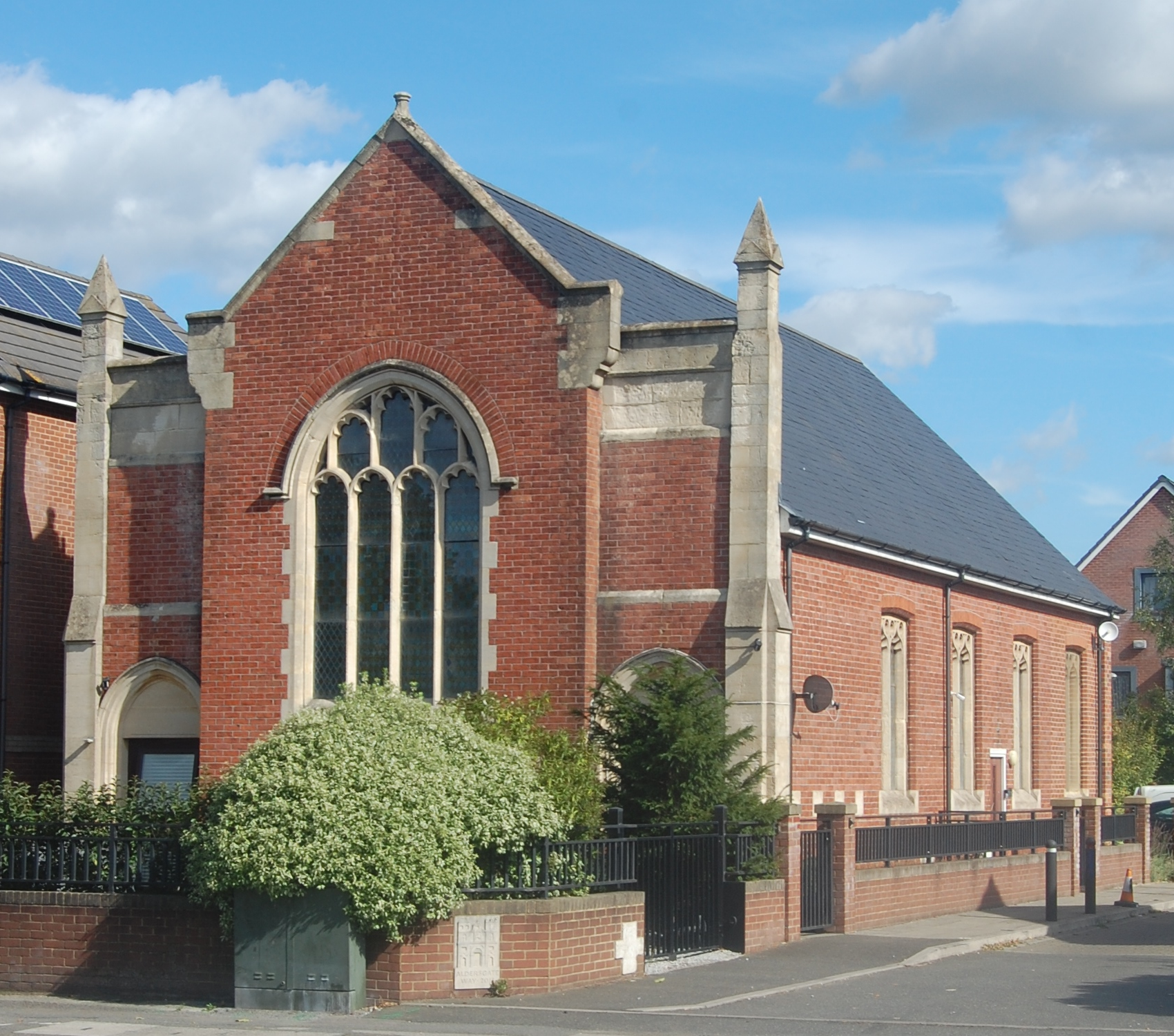
Newtown Methodist Church in 2022

The first chapel opened on 23 March 1876. The Newtown Methodist Church was built in 1907. The building was damaged during an air raid in 1941 and has since been redeveloped into housing.

== Economy ==
Newtown is located across Ringwood Road from Mannings Heath.

== Governance ==
Newtown is part of Newtown and Heathlands ward for elections to Bournemouth, Christchurch and Poole Council.

Newtown is part of the Poole parliamentary constituency.
