= 1999 Poole Borough Council election =

1999 UK local government election

Elections to Poole Borough Council were held on 6 May 1999, alongside other local elections across the United Kingdom. The Liberal Democrats lost the council to no overall control.

== Results summary ==
1999 Poole Council election
Party	Seats before	Seats after	Change
Liberal Democrats	23	19	▼4
Conservative Party	13	17	▲4
Labour Party	3	3	Steady
