= Splashdown Waterpark (Poole) =

Water park in Poole, Dorset, England

Splashdown
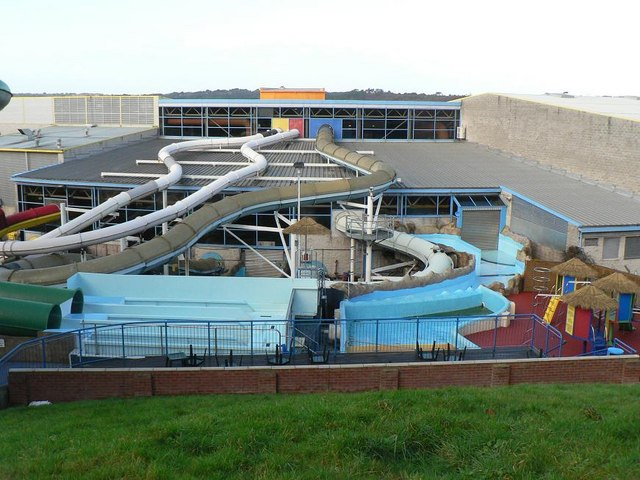
- Interactive map of Splashdown
- Location: Tower Park, Poole, United Kingdom
- Coordinates: 50.74622°N 1.95158°W
- Owner: Alan Richmond
- Opened: 1990
- Operating season: Open all year (weekends only out of season)
- Water slides: 8 indoor and 5 outdoor (summer only) water slides
- Website: Splashdown Poole

Splashdown is a water park located at the Tower Park complex near to Poole, Dorset, England. The park opened in 1990 and was one of the founding attractions at Tower Park. The park experiences approximately 180,000 visitors a year.

It has 8 indoor water slides which operate all year round and 5 outside rides which operate only during the summer season. There is also a wet play area and small training pool for children.

== Slides ==
Splashdown Poole has 13 slides, 8 indoor and 5 outdoor. These are:

- Infinity, a short bowl slide from 2002, originally called Space Bowl. The slide consists of a short enclosed tube section, followed by a large enclosed bowl element where riders helix in the bowl before losing momentum and falling through a hole in the middle into a 2 meters (6.6 ft) landing pool. In 2016, the ride was re-branded as Infinity and light and sound effects were added by Intec Systems. Riders may select music to be played during the descent via a control panel at the slide's entrance; options include various musical genres. The slide has advertisements from Wave 105.2, for example on the side of the landing pool, of which has small windows under the surface for guests to look through and see riders. While Infinity currently has a black and silver colour scheme, it used to be coloured blue and red.
- Dragon's Lair. This slide starts from behind the tower seen at the front of the park, requiring guests to ascend a staircase inside the tower. Once at the top, they are presented with the start of the slide, consisting of a few green steps and a green bay. Above this is a sign saying: "Our dragon is well fed every morning and is not usually hungry... However-We cannot accept responsibility for any particularly 'tasty' riders... Therefore, for your own safety, we must insist that riders lay flat on their backs with arms folded across their chests (And fingers crossed) Good Luck!" What follows is a fully enclosed slide that is red on the inside, with the same coloured roof, but a yellow base outside. Just before the turnaround, the roof elevates up to allow riders to see a model dragon at the end of it.
- Mississippi Drifter. This is a tube slide that consists of slide sections joined by small pools. Mississippi Drifter is the first, indoor half of the whole slide. The second half is outdoors, and called Grand Canyon. During winter months, guests would have to exit just before the half way point.
- Grand Canyon. This is the second half of the slide joined with Mississippi Drifter. This half of the slide is located outdoors, and only open seasonally. There is a 270 degree helix halfway through, where the water from Tennessee Twister, Louisiana Leap and/or The Screamer drains to, through pipes in the roof of the tunnel.
- Zambezi Drop. This is a short 50 metre speed slide that partially sits on the roof of the building. Sliders will reach a speed of 25 mph.
- Red River Roller. This is one of the tamest, and joint longest-at 91 metres-slides in the park.
- Colorado Coaster. This is one of the three slides that start on the lower roof of the building-along with Red River Roller and Zambezi Drop. The slide has a larger tube diameter than the other two slides just mentioned.
- Baron’s Revenge: An 8-metre, high-speed slide that descends from the top pool to the bottom in approximately one second.
- Black Thunder. This gentle slide starts at the top pool alongside Baron’s Revenge. Previously called Treasure Falls Flume, it was renamed Black Thunder in 1996, and given thunder and lightning effects. During winter months, when Grand Canyon is closed, sliders exiting Mississippi Drifter are redirected to Black Thunder instead of Grand Canyon.
- The Screamer. This high speed outdoor slide is one of four on the Screamer Tower. It boasts a very similar, but 10 metre shorter, layout to Zambezi Drop, and finishes its course in under 5 seconds.
- Velocity. This speed slide was added to the Screamer Tower in 2012, and the only slide on it not coloured green. It has a 30 foot drop.
- Tennessee Twister. This is the left side of a pair of Dueling slides on the Screamer Tower. The slide goes through a figure-of-eight layout, before ending beside The Screamer.
- Louisiana Leap. This is the right side of a pair of Dueling slides on the Screamer Tower. The slide goes through a figure-of-eight layout.

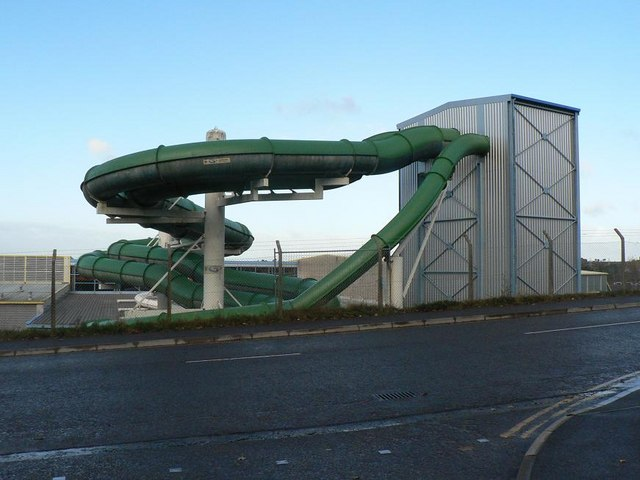
Water slides

== History ==
Splashdown opened in 1990 with eight original rides, including Treasure Falls, Baron’s Revenge, and the Mississippi Drifter. In 1996, the Treasure Falls flume was rebranded as Black Thunder, featuring new atmospheric effects. The park expanded in 1998 with the construction of a 15-metre tower housing three additional flumes: The Screamer, Louisiana Leap, and Tennessee Twister.

Further developments occurred in 2002 with the installation of the Spacebowl and a new children's pool. During a 2005 remodeling of the Tower Park complex, the original front tower was demolished; it was replaced by a smaller structure and the Dragon's Lair attraction. The operating company expanded in 2009 by acquiring and rebranding Splashdown@Quaywest in Devon. More recent additions include the Velocity slide in 2012 and the rebranding of Space Bowl to Infinity in 2016.
