= Stanley Green, Poole =

Suburb of Poole, Dorset, England

Coordinates: 50.7350°N 1.9868°W

Stanley Green
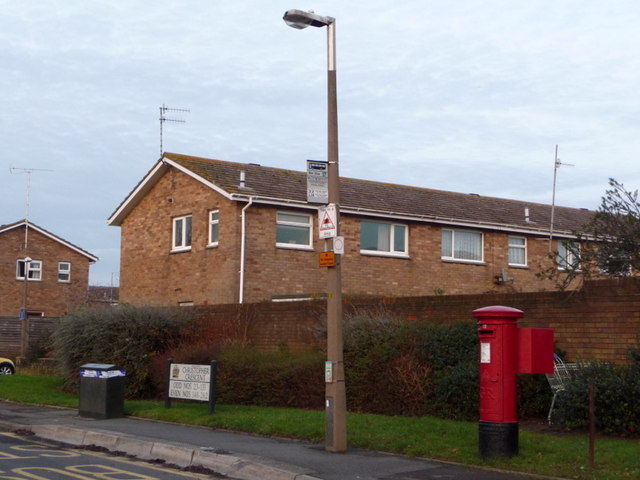
- Christopher Crescent

- Location within Dorset
- Unitary authority: Bournemouth, Christchurch and Poole
- Ceremonial county: Dorset
- Region: South West
- Country: England
- Sovereign state: United Kingdom
- Police: Dorset
- Fire: Dorset and Wiltshire
- Ambulance: South Western
- UK Parliament: Poole

Stanley Green is a suburb of Poole, in the Bournemouth, Christchurch and Poole district, in the ceremonial county of Dorset, England. Stanley Green is north of Longfleet, and south of Oakdale.

== Education ==
- Stanley Green Infant Academy
- St Mary's RC Primary School

== Amenities ==
The suburb has its own public playground.

== Politics ==
Stanley Green is part of the Poole parliamentary constituency for elections to the House of Commons. Stanley Green is part of the Oakdale ward for elections to Bournemouth, Christchurch and Poole Council.
