= Rossmore, Dorset =

Area of Poole, Dorset, England

Rossmore
- suburb
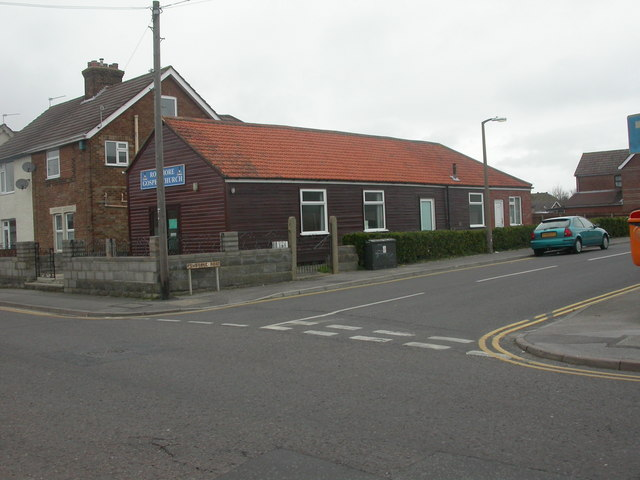
- Rossmore Gospel Church
- Unitary authority: Bournemouth, Christchurch and Poole
- Region: South West
- Country: England
- Sovereign state: United Kingdom
- Post town: BOURNEMOUTH
- Postcode district: BH
- UK Parliament: Poole

Rossmore is a suburb of Poole, Dorset. Rossmore is close to Alder Hills, Newtown and Parkstone.

== Amenities ==
The area is served by the Rossmore Leisure Centre and Rossmore Library.

== Politics ==
Rossmore is split between the Poole and the Bournemouth West parliamentary constituencies. Southern Rossmore is also part of the Newtown and Heatherlands ward which elects 3 councillors to Bournemouth, Christchurch and Poole Council, and Northern Rossmore is part of the Alderney and Bourne Valley ward.
