= Poole People Party =

Local political party in England

Poole People
- Leader: Mark Howell
- Founded: 2010; 16 years ago
- Headquarters: Poole
- Ideology: Localism; Non-partisan politics
- BCP Council: 5 / 76

Website
- poolepeople.org.uk

The Party for Poole People (known simply as Poole People) is a movement and local political party in Poole, Dorset, England. The party has stood in elections for the former Poole Borough Council and the Bournemouth, Christchurch and Poole Council which replaced it. On the council it is part of the Poole Independents Group, which includes all three Poole People Councillors, one Alliance for Local Living (ALL) Councillor and one independent Councillor. It was previously part of the "Unity Alliance" administration on Bournemouth, Christchurch and Poole Council from 2019 until a vote of no confidence in 2020, after which the party has been in opposition. It was founded in 2010 by Mark Howell, and has contested three local elections, as well as the Poole constituency in the 2015 UK general election.

== History ==
=== Poole Borough Council ===
Mark Howell, the party leader, was the first elected member of the party, standing in the 2010 Poole Town by-election after former Council Leader Cllr Leverett died, gaining the seat from the Conservatives. He was re-elected to his seat in the subsequent 2011 council election, with the party making two more gains from the Conservatives, in Hamworthy East and a further seat in Poole Town, bringing the number of councillors up to three. The subsequent defection by a Conservative councillor in 2012 to the party brought its number up to four in total. In the 2015 council election, the Conservatives gained a Hamworthy East seat whilst Poole People gained a Conservative seat in Hamworthy West, meaning that the party remained on three seats in total. In the 2017 General Election, party leader Mark Howell stood for the parliamentary seat of Poole, where he received 1,776 votes (3.7%), coming sixth out of seven.

=== Bournemouth, Christchurch and Poole Council ===
In 2019, Poole Borough Council was combined with those of Bournemouth and Christchurch to form a new unitary authority; In the inaugural 2019 council elections for the new Bournemouth, Christchurch and Poole Council, Poole People stood eight councillors in five wards out of the twelve wards entirely within the former Poole Borough (Talbot and Branksome Woods had a small area in the former borough), with seven councillors elected. The election saw the Conservatives as the largest party but without a majority, which lead to the creation of the majority Unity Alliance Administration, a coalition of parties in which Poole People joined led by the Liberal Democrats, the second largest party on the council. As well as joining the administration, Poole People also formed a grouping with the Alliance for Local Living, called Poole People and ALL. The Alliance for Local Living's leader and single councillor, Felicity Rice won alongside one of two seats in the Oakdale ward, alongside Poole People Councillor Pete Miles. The Hamworthy ward elected two councillors from Poole People.

However, in October of that year two councillors resigned from the party and group to sit as independents, citing concerns about the leader and “the binds of the political whip”. Councillor Butt left the Unity Alliance administration at the time, with Councillor Bagwell subsequently leaving the administration in September 2020. As such, Poole People currently has five sitting councillors. A vote of no confidence was passed in September 2020, with Conservatives taking minority administration of the council after a meeting on 1 October, meaning that Poole People is currently in opposition.

Two further Poole People councillors (Steve Baron and Peter Miles) subsequently left the group in November 2020, stating that the party had "lost its way" and that they would be more "free to speak out" as independents, thus leaving the party with just three councillors, and the Poole People and ALL BCP group with four. In June 2022, Julie Bagwell joined the Poole Local Group.

In the 2023 Bournemouth, Christchurch and Poole Council election, Poole People elected five councillors.

== Sitting councillors ==
=== Since 2023 ===
Name	Ward	Notes
Mark Howell	Poole Town	Leader of Poole People
Andy Hadley	Poole Town	
Brian Hitchcock	Hamworthy	
Felicity Rice	Oakdale	Elected in 2019 for the Alliance for Local Living
Peter Francis Miles	Oakdale	

=== Until 2023 ===
Name	Ward	First elected	Notes
Mark Howell	Poole Town	2010 (Note: Poole Borough Council)	Leader of Poole People; Former Deputy Leader of BCP Council and Portfolio Holder for Regeneration and Culture during Unity Alliance
Andy Hadley	Poole Town	2015	Portfolio Holder for Transport and Infrastructure during Unity Alliance
L-J Evans	Poole Town	2019	Chair of Unity Alliance group

== Election results ==
=== District council elections ===
Year	Votes	%	+/-	Seats	+/-
Poole Borough Council
2011	9,603	8.8%	▲8.8%	3 / 42	▲3
2015	13,269	7.7%	▼1.1%	3 / 42	Steady
Bournemouth, Christchurch and Poole Council
2019	11,243	5.4%	N/A	7 / 76	N/A
2023	5,995	3.0%	▼2.4%	5 / 76	▼2

=== General elections ===
The party leader and councillor Mark Howell stood for the party in the Poole constituency in the 2015 election, receiving 1,766 votes (3.7%). The party did not contest the seat in the 2017, 2019 or 2024 general elections.

General election 2015: Poole
Party	Candidate	Votes	%	±%
Conservative	Robert Syms	23,745	50.1	▲2.6
UKIP	David Young	7,956	16.8	▲11.5
Labour	Helen Rosser	6,102	12.9	▲0.1
Liberal Democrats	Philip Eades	5,572	11.8	▼19.8
Green	Adrian Oliver	2,198	4.6	▲4.6
Poole People	Mark Howell	1,766	3.7	▲3.7
Independent	Ian Northover	54	0.1	▼0.3
Majority		15,789	33.3	▲17.4
Turnout		47,393	65.3	▼8.1
Conservative hold		Swing		
