= Tower Park =

Leisure and retail park, located at Mannings Heath, Poole, Dorset, England

Coordinates: 50°44′46″N 1°57′8″W

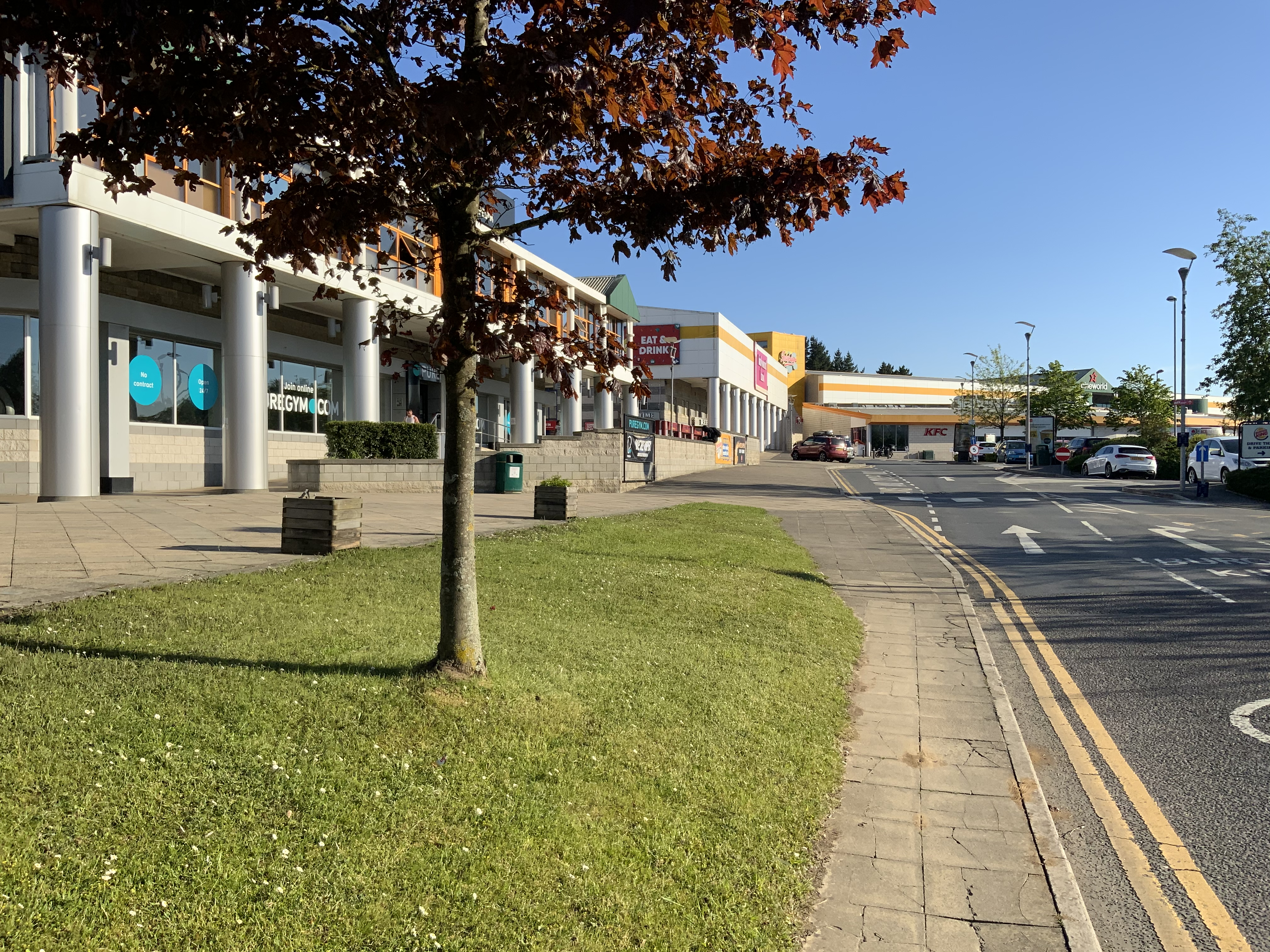
The front of Tower Park, Poole

Tower Park is a leisure and retail park, located at Mannings Heath, in Poole, Dorset, England. It was one of the first complexes of its kind in Europe when it opened in 1989.

== History ==
The leisure park, which opened in 1989, was a development initiated by local Dorset businessman Bill Riddle, who operated a landfill site in the area. The site chosen for the park was at Mannings Heath, on 53 acres of heathland just outside Poole. Riddle funded the project by selling some land at Mannings Heath to Tesco and much of the park was leased to Allied Leisure PLC.

Tower Park was initially very successful as the quality of its attractions and free parking proved popular. The original attractions included a 10-screen UCI cinema, Megabowl (a 30-lane bowling alley), Ice Trax skating rink, Splashdown Waterpark and an 1,850-capacity nightclub called The Venue, which became one of the leading ‘superclubs’ in the country.

However, within three years of opening, the park went into Administration as a consequence of the early 1990s recession. Although the complex as a whole was rescued by its sale to Tower Park Properties, neither the Ice Trax skating rink nor The Venue nightclub proved to be commercially viable in the longer term. Ice Trax closed in the mid-1990s and The Venue in 1999. The latter did briefly re-open in 2002, but the re-launch did not last.

A Tesco supermarket store was also built at Tower Park. In 2002 it was discovered that a petrol leak from the store’s filling station had been polluting local groundwater for six months. The company was fined by the Environment Agency, although Tesco claimed it had been treated unfairly.

In 2003, Tower Park was sold to X-Leisure, a company headed by PY Gerbeau, which added it to its Xscape brand. The following year X-Leisure invested £5m in refurbishing and expanding the facilities in the park, including adding additional restaurant units. These included Pizza Hut, Nando’s and KFC. The existing buildings were also given new cladding and an open plaza created between Splashdown and the cinema, allowing the new restaurants to have outside seating. A newly rebuilt Burger King restaurant was opened in 2005, the original restaurant having been destroyed by a disgruntled Burger King employee in an arson attack 18 months earlier.

The cinema was sold to Empire Cinemas in 2004 along with five other UCI theatres in other parts of the UK. Empire added an additional six screens and 500 seats in 2011, making the cinema one of the biggest multiplexes in the south of the country. In 2016, it was sold to Cineworld together with four other Empire cinemas. Gala Bingo, which had taken over Ice Trax premises in the mid-90s, was re-branded as Buzz Bingo in 2018. In 2014, a chemical spill at the Splashdown Waterpark resulted in hundreds of people being evacuated from the attraction.

In 2013, X-Leisure was taken over by the UK’s largest property development and investment Group, Landsec. Tower Park continues to be listed by Landsec as one of its leisure properties on its website.

In late 2024, Tower Park will undergo a multi-million-pound refurbishment.

== Attractions and amenities ==
The buildings at Tower Park occupy an area of 199,000 sq. ft., according to its ultimate owner Landsec. There is an open plaza between the buildings providing outdoor seating. There is also a ground level free car park with disabled spaces.

The attractions include a Vue 16-screen multiplex cinema, a Splashdown Waterpark with 13 outdoor and indoor flume rides, Buzz Bingo, Lemur Landings children’s softplay, Hollywood Bowl bowling alley, and a PureGym health club. In addition, food outlets and restaurants include, according to Tower Park’s website, Burger King, KFC, Nando’s, Pizza Hut, Taco Bell and Pizza Express. A Tesco superstore is also located at Tower Park.
