= Bearwood, Dorset =

Suburb of Poole, Dorset, England

Coordinates: 50.772°N 1.934°W

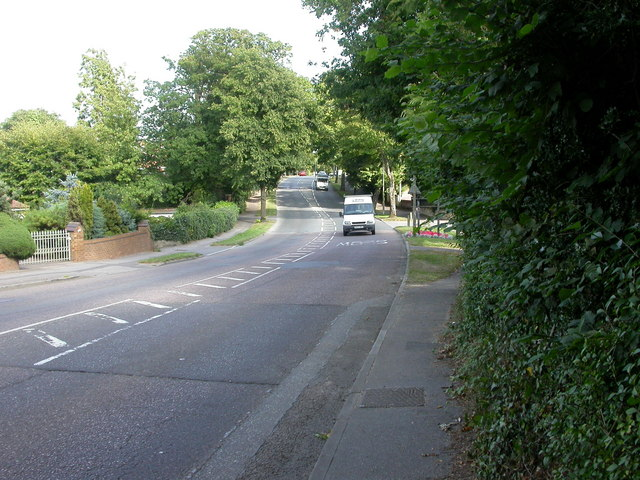
Magna Road, Bearwood

Bearwood is a suburb of Poole, Dorset, England. It is centred on a supermarket and medical and neighbourhood centre in King John Avenue.

Bearwood has a school and nursery, Bearwood Primary and Nursery School. There is also a Preschool, Bearwood Pre-School. It is also home to Bearwood Community Centre and Social Club.

== History ==
The area was mainly developed in the 1980s on what had been open heathland. The roads are named after titles of English nobility and people linked to the signing of Magna Carta. This is derived from the fact that the oldest road in the area, a part of the Wimborne Minster to Bournemouth road, is called Magna Road as it passes through the village of Canford Magna.

In 2019, a new housing estate was completed on the outskirts of the settlement on Magna Road.

== Transport ==
Buses operated by Morebus connect Bearwood to Poole Town Centre and Alderney, Bournemouth, Castlepoint Shopping Centre, Merley, and Wimborne Minster.

== Politics ==
Bearwood is part of the Bearwood and Merley ward, which elects 3 councillors to Bournemouth, Christchurch and Poole Council.
