= Poole Engage Party =

Local political party in England

- Leader: Judes Butt
- Founded: June 2022; 3 years ago
- Split from: Conservative Party
- Preceded by: Poole Local Group
- Headquarters: Poole
- Ideology: Localism; Non-partisan politics
- BCP Council: 2 / 76

Website
- pooleengage.org.uk

The Poole Engage Party is a local political party on Bournemouth, Christchurch and Poole Council. Until December 2022, the party was known as the Poole Local Group.

== History ==
The group was formed in June 2022 as the Poole Local Group, by five councillors. Four out of the five members were deselected by the Poole Conservative Association for the 2023 election. They successfully appealed but decided not to return to the Conservative Party, hence the creation of a new party. With the founding of the party, the council was once again under no overall control, and the Conservatives were put into a minority administration.

The party changed its name to the Poole Engage Party in December 2022.

They stood 16 candidates in the 2023 Bournemouth, Christchurch and Poole Council election. Only party leader Judes Butt in Creekmoor and Julie Bagwell in Hamworthy were re-elected.

== Membership ==
The group had 5 members from 2022 to 2023:

Councillor	Ward	Elected as
Julie Bagwell	Hamworthy	Poole People
Steve Baron	Parkstone	Poole People
Daniel Butt	Hamworthy	Poole People
Judes Butt	Creekmoor	Conservative
Mohan Iyengar	Canford Cliffs	Conservative

Following the 2023 election the group had 2 members:

Councillor	Ward	Elected as
Julie Bagwell	Hamworthy	Poole People
Judes Butt	Creekmoor	Conservative
