= Canford Cliffs =

Suburb of Poole, Dorset, England

Coordinates: 50.70°N 1.93°W

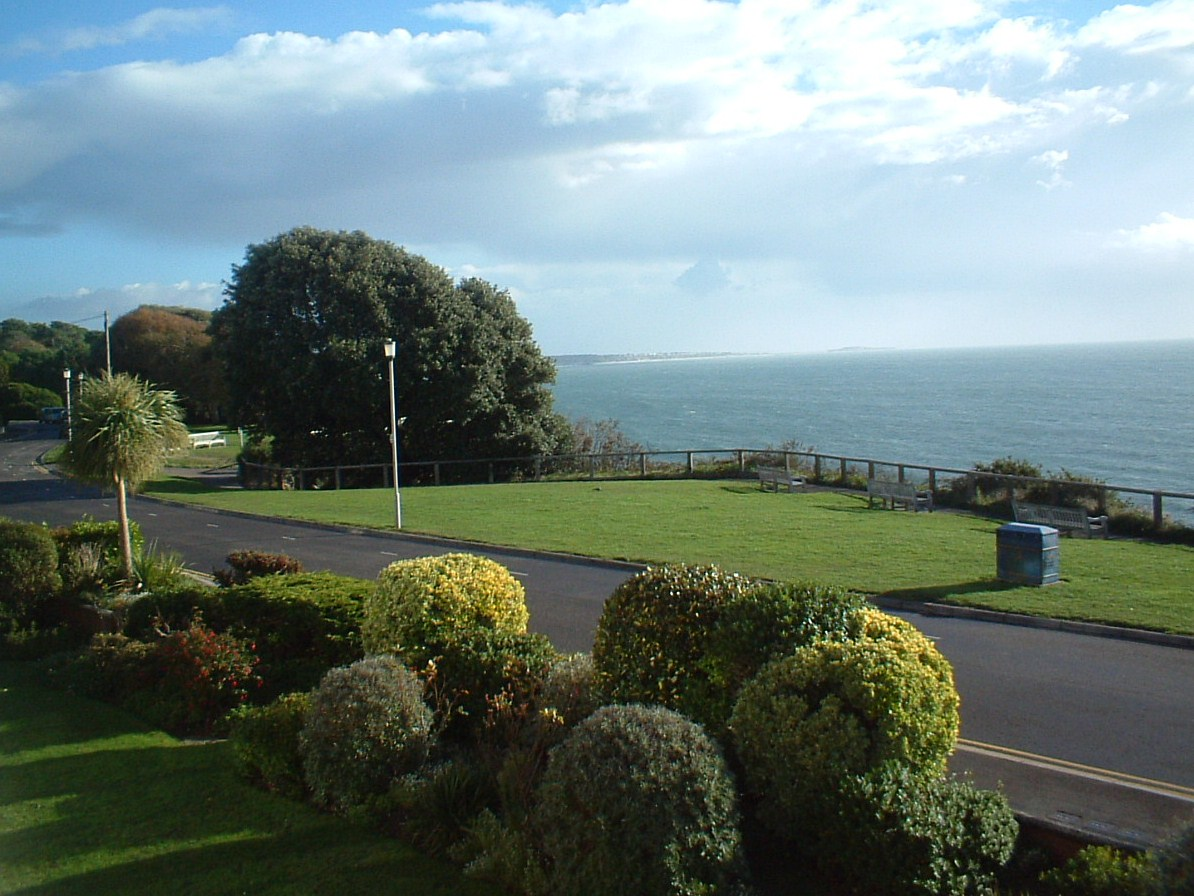
- Clifftop: Cliff Drive, Canford Cliffs

- Location within Dorset
- Population: 8,620 (2011)
- OS grid reference: SZ055895
- Unitary authority: Bournemouth, Christchurch and Poole
- Ceremonial county: Dorset
- Region: South West
- Country: England
- Sovereign state: United Kingdom
- Post town: POOLE
- Postcode district: BH13
- Dialling code: 01202
- Police: Dorset
- Fire: Dorset and Wiltshire
- Ambulance: South Western
- UK Parliament: Poole

Canford Cliffs is a suburb of Poole in Dorset, England. The neighbourhood lies on the English Channel coast midway between Poole and Bournemouth. To the southwest is Sandbanks which has some of the highest property values in the world; with Canford Cliffs it forms a parish which has the fourth highest property prices in the world and second highest in the United Kingdom after London.

== Etymology ==
The name of Canford Cliffs is first attested in the Domesday Book of 1086 as Cheneford, with subsequent medieval spellings along the lines of Keneford (1181) and Caneford (1195). Scholars agree that the second part of the name derives from Old English ford ("ford"). The first part of the name is usually given as an Old English personal name Cana, but it has been suggested that this element was actually the common noun cāna ("jackdaws'", genitive plural of cā). Thus the name once meant either "Cana's ford" or "jackdaws' ford".

== History ==
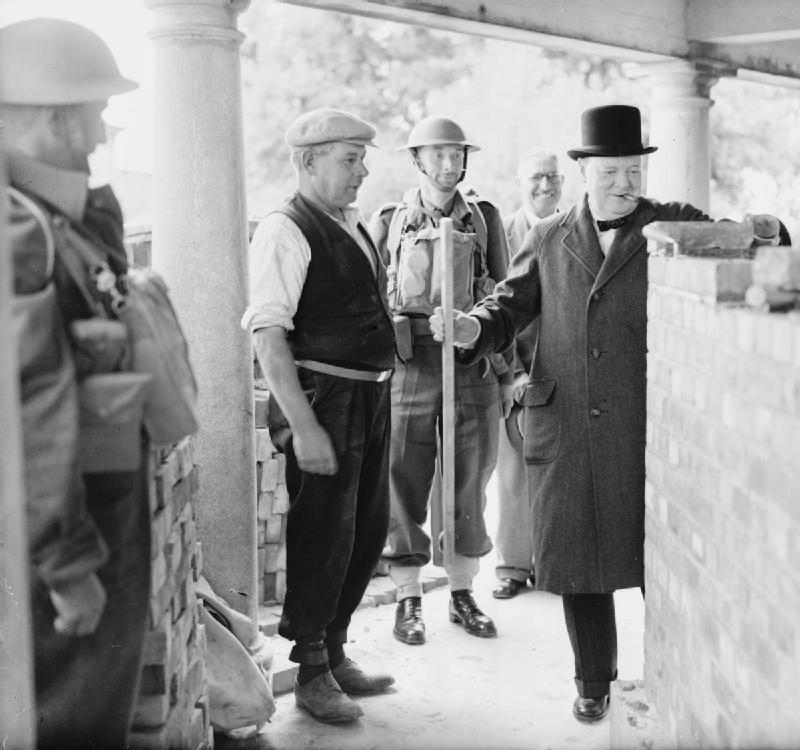
Prime Minister Winston Churchill helps to build a pillbox at Sandbank Pavillion, Poole, England, (near Canford Cliffs) during a visit to Southern Command on 17 July 1940.

Originally part of the estate of Lord Wimborne, development began in the 1880s. The land around Haven Road was divided into plots and buildings designed individually. To prevent erosion of the cliffs, which caused annual falls, a sea wall and promenade was constructed in the 1930s. The area was originally designed to be residential, with a church and village hall but few commercial buildings. The Canford Cliffs Land Society still works to preserve these goals, and there are few businesses and no industry in the area.

In 2021, stabilisation works was carried out to secure the cliffs. Works began in September 2020.

== Geography ==
Canford Cliffs is located along the eastern edge of Poole Harbour. Canford Cliffs is south of Parkstone and north of Sandbanks. Canford Cliffs is built around a small hill, with a maximum elevation of 30 metres above sea level. Canford Cliffs Chine, running southeast towards Sandbanks, is sandy and flat and the neighbouring waters relatively shallow, making Canford Cliffs a popular site for watersports, especially windsurfing and parasailing.

== Demographics ==
Canford Cliffs has a significant population of retired people; in the 2001 Census, 31.30% of the population was registered as retired, twice the national average, while 44.42% of the population was registered as being over 65, far greater than the national average of 15.89%.

The area is also far more affluent than typical: the area has a type 1 ACORN classification (affluent mature professionals, large houses), putting it in the top 1.7% of the population. 62.55% of homes are owned outright, while the national average is 21.19%, and less than 0.6% of the population lives in council housing, only one-twentieth of the national average, 13.21%. 73.26% of the population is in the ABC1 social grade when the national average is 51.91%. 81.66% of households have no dependent children against a national average of 56.58%.

== Banking controversy ==
The area is home to the Canford Cliffs branch of HSBC. The bank announced that as a pilot experiment, the entire branch would be upgraded to a "premium" branch. Although cashpoints would remain free-of-use outside the branch, all indoor services would be restricted to those with savings of £ 50,000, a mortgage of £200,000, or a salary of £100,000 and a mortgage of £75,000; otherwise the customer must pay £19.95 per month or use another branch.

HSBC defended its decision, claiming "not everybody in the world is equal. Some people have higher incomes and need greater services through the bank. These customers demand a better service" and referring to its other branches in the Poole area, which remain free of charge.

However, the move angered many customers and commentators; The Daily Telegraph quoted one account holder as saying "This is outrageous. It is particularly discriminatory against people who are house rich and cash poor. What happens if you are an elderly person living in a £500,000 house with no mortgage and no £75,000 salary?", while the customer advisory service Money Supermarket expressed fears that it may be "thin end of the wedge", saying "HSBC has given the green light to other high street providers to look at splitting their customers into first class and cattle class".

The branch was subsequently closed on 6 November 2015. HSBC said the closure was due to the rise of internet banking and the impending renewal of the lease.

== Politics ==
Canford Cliffs is part of the Canford Cliffs ward which elects two councillors to Bournemouth, Christchurch and Poole Council, and also the Poole parliamentary constituency.
