= Alderney, Dorset =

Suburb of the town of Poole in Dorset, England

Coordinates: 50.749°N 1.934°W

Alderney
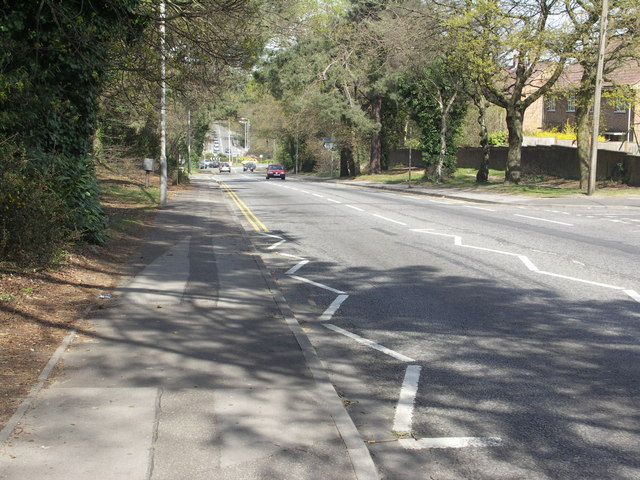
- Ringwood Road, Alderney

- Location within Dorset
- Population: 11,196 (1 Ward 11,196)
- OS grid reference: SZ 047 943
- Unitary authority: Bournemouth, Christchurch and Poole
- Ceremonial county: Dorset
- Region: South West
- Country: England
- Sovereign state: United Kingdom
- Post town: POOLE
- Postcode district: BH12
- Dialling code: 01202
- Police: Dorset
- Fire: Dorset and Wiltshire
- Ambulance: South Western
- UK Parliament: Bournemouth West

Alderney is a suburb of the town of Poole in Dorset, England, south of Wallisdown and west of Alder Hills.

Until 2019, Alderney was an electoral ward, which had a population of 11,423 at the 2011 census.

== Geography ==
The boundaries of the former Alderney electoral ward are roughly defined as being all areas north of Herbert Avenue, west of Alder Road (between the junction at Herbert Avenue and the Wallisdown roundabout), south of Wallisdown Road (between Wallisdown and Mountbatten roundabouts) and streets branching off both sides of Ringwood Road (between Mountbatten roundabout and the junction with Herbert Avenue). Some of these areas are more commonly referred to as other suburbs e.g. the area southwest of Wallisdown roundabout is often referred to as Wallisdown (historically Highmore) and the area around the junction of Herbert Avenue and Alder Road is known as Rossmore.

=== Bourne Valley nature reserve ===
Bourne Valley nature reserve is a Site of Special Scientific Interest (SSSI). Situated to the north of Alderney, the area includes the protected lowland heath, Bourne Bottom. The site is approximately 80 hectares (200 acres), and consists mainly of boggy heath and trees. Bourne Valley is the start of one of the tributaries forming the Bourne Stream which eventually runs into Bournemouth. Three culverts which emerge from under Ringwood Road start the stream, and, according to local anti-pollution body, the Bourne Stream Partnership, it is believed they come from Canford Heath, Sembcorp water works, and road run-off.

=== Bourne Valley Park ===
To the south of Evering Avenue is Bourne Valley Park, formerly known as Alderney Recreation ground. The area was developed between 2003 and 2007 by the Bourne Stream partnership after the area became a problem: football pitches that were too boggy to be used, antisocial behaviour from motorcycle riders, pollution from nearby commercial ventures and rubbish. The 6.1 hectares (15 acres) open space consists of wooded areas, heathland, streams, a pond, much open grass land, a large adventure park and off-road bike park.

== History ==
Until the 1940s, most of the area between Herbert Avenue and Ringwood Road was heathland known as Alderney Heath. After the Second World War there was a great need for housing due to a sharp increase in population. Poole Council built many council owned houses in Alderney in the late forties and fifties, mostly semi-detached houses and terraces of four. Many of the street names in the estate were themed around the Channel Islands Later, more housing was added, generally bungalows.

In 2023, 24 homes for homeless people were opened on the grounds of the former Bourne Valley Community Centre.

== Buildings and landmarks ==
=== Alderney Hospital ===
Alderney Hospital was built in 1888 for the care of the elderly; it now specialises in dementia and mental health with both in and out patients.

=== Alderney Manor ===
Alderney Cottage, later Alderney Manor, was sited on the Poole to Ringwood road between Knighton Bottom and Howe Corner from the early 19th century. A housing estate now occupies the site. The politician, writer and sportsman Grantley Berkeley was the tenant there from around 1860 until 1880, just before his death. The artist Augustus John established an artists' colony there in 1911. Faye Hammill relates how he lived there with "his five legitimate children, his mistress Dorelia McNeill, and his two children by her; and they remained there until 1927, in the company of numerous long-term guests". One frequent visitor was fellow artist Henry Lamb. Aspects of John's life during this period were used as background by Margaret Kennedy in her novel The Constant Nymph (1924).

=== Alderney Manor Community Centre ===
Alderney Manor Community Centre is a social venue which holds classes and events and can be hired out by organisations and members of the public. The venue is used as a polling station for local and general elections.

=== Schools ===
- St Aldhelm's Academy (formerly Rossmore Community College and Martin Kemp-Welch School)
- Manorside Primary School
- Winchelsea Special School

== Ward profile ==
The electoral ward was Poole's second most densely populated area with 31 people to each hectare (2.5 acres) and suffers much higher than average levels of poverty, illiteracy and crime.

== Politics ==
Alderney is part of the Alderney and Bourne Valley ward for elections to Bournemouth, Christchurch and Poole Council. Alderney is also part of the Bournemouth West parliamentary constituency.
