= 2003 Poole Borough Council election =

2003 UK local government election

Map of Poole showing the results of the 2003 local election.

Elections to Poole Borough Council were held on 1 May 2003, alongside other local elections across the United Kingdom. The Conservative Party won the council from no overall control.

== Results summary ==
2003 Poole Council election
Party	Seats before	Seats after	Change
Conservative Party	17	26	▲9
Liberal Democrats	19	16	▼3
Labour Party	3	0	▼3
