= 2007 Poole Borough Council election =

2007 UK local government election

Map of results of 2007 election

Elections to Poole Borough Council were held on 3 May 2007 in line with other local elections in the United Kingdom. All 42 seats across 16 wards of this unitary authority were up for election.

There were 115 candidates nominated, comprised as follows:- 42 Conservatives, 36 Liberal Democrats, 16 Labour, 13 UK Independence Party, 5 Independents, 2 British National Party and 1 Green Party.

== Election result summary ==
Poole Election Result 2007
Party	Seats	Gains	Losses	Net gain/loss	Seats %	Votes %	Votes	+/−
Conservative	25	2	3	-1	50.9	59.5	54,506	
Liberal Democrats	17	3	2	+1	40.5	38.2	40,956	
UKIP	0	0	0	0	0	3.9	4,182	
Labour	0	0	0	0	0	3.6	3,907	
Independent	0	0	0	0	0	1.7	1,835	
BNP	0	0	0	0	0	0.8	878	
Green	0	0	0	0	0	0.4	836	

== Election results by ward ==
Alderney (3 seats)
Party	Candidate	Votes	%	±%
Liberal Democrats	Tony Trent	1,652		
Liberal Democrats	Lindsay Wilson	1,611		
Liberal Democrats	Charles Meachin	1,534		
Conservative	Carol Burnell	537		
Conservative	Michael Woolrych	518		
Conservative	Linda Gillard	515		
BNP	Stuart Smith	464		
UKIP	Joan Player	349		
Labour	Verity Sanderson	302		
Turnout		2,900	34.86	
Liberal Democrats hold		Swing		
Liberal Democrats hold		Swing		
Liberal Democrats hold		Swing		

Branksome East (2 seats)
Party	Candidate	Votes	%	±%
Conservative	Mary Hillman	947		
Conservative	Guy Montrose	817		
Independent	Veronica Trevett	577		
Liberal Democrats	Cathey Gardner	353		
Liberal Democrats	Peter Matthews	334		
Turnout		1,689	35.71	
Conservative hold		Swing		
Conservative hold		Swing		

Branksome West (2 seats)
Party	Candidate	Votes	%	±%
Liberal Democrats	Philip Eades	1,119		
Conservative	Joyce Lavender	1,007		
Liberal Democrats	Marion Le Poidevin	996		
Conservative	Jonathan Bagram	854		
Turnout		2,108	38.90	
Liberal Democrats hold		Swing		
Conservative hold		Swing		

Broadstone (3 seats)
Party	Candidate	Votes	%	±%
Liberal Democrats	Michael Brooke	2,696		
Liberal Democrats	Graham Mason	2,314		
Liberal Democrats	Daniel Martin	2,301		
Conservative	David Newell	1,872		
Conservative	Barry Smith	1,796		
Conservative	Marie Krolski-Pethen	1,587		
UKIP	Ian Critchley	307		
Independent	Roy Godfrey	272		
Independent	Brian Lloyd	235		
Turnout		4,671	55.67	
Liberal Democrats hold		Swing		
Liberal Democrats hold		Swing		
Liberal Democrats gain from Conservative		Swing		

Canford Cliffs (3 seats)
Party	Candidate	Votes	%	±%
Conservative	Carol Deas	2,610		
Conservative	May Haines	2,414		
Conservative	Niel Sorton	2,263		
Liberal Democrats	Robin Rennison	508		
UKIP	John Haywood	420		
Turnout		3,119	43.27	
Conservative hold		Swing		
Conservative hold		Swing		
Conservative hold		Swing		

Canford Heath East (2 seats)
Party	Candidate	Votes	%	±%
Liberal Democrats	Sandra Moore	1,221		
Liberal Democrats	Graham Curtis	1,152		
Conservative	Margaret Roebuck	410		
Conservative	Sheila Roberts	399		
UKIP	Valerie Foice	139		
Labour	Matthew Smith	83		
Labour	James Selby-Bennett	76		
Turnout		1,844	34.20	
Liberal Democrats hold		Swing		
Liberal Democrats hold		Swing		

Canford Heath West (2 seats)
Party	Candidate	Votes	%	±%
Liberal Democrats	Chris Matthews	1,100		
Liberal Democrats	Jeffrey Allen	994		
Conservative	Bernard Broderick	757		
Conservative	Mike Walton	706		
UKIP	Jack Edwards	163		
Labour	Julie Sanderson	125		
Labour	George Inglis	113		
Turnout		2,104	39.76	
Liberal Democrats hold		Swing		
Liberal Democrats hold		Swing		

Creekmoor (3 seats)
Party	Candidate	Votes	%	±%
Conservative	Leslie Burden	1,649		
Conservative	John Rampton	1,503		
Conservative	Judy Butt	1,475		
Liberal Democrats	Rory Mackay	788		
Liberal Democrats	Keith Bates	757		
Liberal Democrats	Andrew May	753		
UKIP	John Butler	364		
Turnout		2,556	35.18	
Conservative hold		Swing		
Conservative hold		Swing		
Conservative hold		Swing		

Hamworthy East (2 seats)
Party	Candidate	Votes	%	±%
Conservative	Roger Gregory	805		
Conservative	Mike White	793		
Liberal Democrats	Carol Bond	494		
Liberal Democrats	Martin Fraser	377		
Labour	Darren Brown	256		
Labour	Jason Sanderson	209		
Turnout		1,542	35.65	
Conservative hold		Swing		
Conservative hold		Swing		

Hamworthy West (2 seats)
Party	Candidate	Votes	%	±%
Conservative	Graham Chandler	829		
Conservative	Michael Wilkins	815		
Liberal Democrats	Lou Knight	563		
Liberal Democrats	Ann Deacon	510		
Labour	Pat Hicks	223		
Labour	Bill Duncan	198		
Turnout		1,649	32.61	
Conservative gain from Liberal Democrats		Swing		
Conservative gain from Liberal Democrats		Swing		

Merley and Bearwood (3 seats)
Party	Candidate	Votes	%	±%
Liberal Democrats	Peter Maiden	2,238		
Liberal Democrats	David Brown	2,227		
Liberal Democrats	Daphne Long	2,036		
Conservative	Katie Hives	1,676		
Conservative	Jonathan Pethen	1,492		
Conservative	Karen Rampton	1,475		
Turnout		3,901	46.81	
Liberal Democrats hold		Swing		
Liberal Democrats gain from Conservative		Swing		
Liberal Democrats gain from Conservative		Swing		

Newtown (3 seats)
Party	Candidate	Votes	%	±%
Liberal Democrats	Michael Plummer	1,452		
Liberal Democrats	Brian Clements	1,439		
Liberal Democrats	Graham Wilson	1,391		
Conservative	John Allen	854		
Conservative	Leo Belcham	809		
Conservative	Suki Tate	770		
Labour	Hazel Malcolm-Walker	322		
Labour	Ian Malcolm-Walker	287		
Turnout		2,781	30.75	
Liberal Democrats hold		Swing		
Liberal Democrats hold		Swing		
Liberal Democrats hold		Swing		

Oakdale (3 seats)
Party	Candidate	Votes	%	±%
Conservative	Peter Adams	1,584		
Conservative	David Gillard	1,484		
Conservative	Janet Walton	1,194		
Liberal Democrats	Christina Parker	572		
Liberal Democrats	Sean Perrin	926		
Liberal Democrats	Angela van Lancker	868		
Labour	Brian Ellis	413		
UKIP	Gillian Coulbeck	379		
Labour	Tony Gardner	363		
UKIP	Emma-Leigh Graham	353		
UKIP	Michael Fisher	322		
Labour	Tilak Ginige	298		
Turnout		2,781	30.75	
Conservative hold		Swing		
Conservative hold		Swing		
Conservative hold		Swing		

Parkstone (3 seats)
Party	Candidate	Votes	%	±%
Conservative	Anne Stribley	2,074		
Conservative	Don Collier	1,989		
Conservative	Tony Woodcock	1,747		
Liberal Democrats	Judith Howells	947		
Green	Jack Constantine	836		
Independent	Ian Northover	559		
BNP	Glenn Chappelle-Marriot	298		
Turnout		3,352	40.51	
Conservative hold		Swing		
Conservative hold		Swing		
Conservative hold		Swing		

Penn Hill (3 seats)
Party	Candidate	Votes	%	±%
Conservative	Elaine Atkinson	1,947		
Conservative	Xena Dion	1,942		
Conservative	Ronald Parker	1,911		
Liberal Democrats	Quenten Walker	900		
UKIP	Marion Wilson	472		
Turnout		3,068	36.14	
Conservative hold		Swing		
Conservative hold		Swing		
Conservative hold		Swing		

Poole Town (3 seats)
Party	Candidate	Votes	%	±%
Conservative	Carol Evans	1,248		
Conservative	Brian Leverett	1,245		
Conservative	Chris Bulteel	1,190		
Liberal Democrats	Sarah Wilson	485		
Liberal Democrats	David Parker	480		
Liberal Democrats	Anndrew Muspratt	478		
UKIP	Avril King	377		
Labour	Jennie Ellis	346		
Labour	John Hewinson	293		
UKIP	Andrew Smith	286		
UKIP	Peter Wheat	251		
Independent	Jason Jones	192		
Turnout		2,481	35.40	
Conservative hold		Swing		
Conservative hold		Swing		
Conservative hold		Swing		
