= 2011 Poole Borough Council election =

2011 UK local government election

Map of results of 2011 election

Elections to Poole Borough Council were held on 5 May 2011 in line with other local elections in the United Kingdom. All 42 seats across 16 wards of this unitary authority were up for election.

There were 118 candidates nominated, comprised as follows:- 42 Conservatives, 33 Liberal Democrats, 11 UK Independence Party, 9 Independents, 11 Labour, 8 Poole People, 2 Green Party and 2 British National Party.

== Election result summary ==
Poole Election Result 2011
Party	Seats	Gains	Losses	Net gain/loss	Seats %	Votes %	Votes	+/−
Conservative	21	2	3	-1	50.0	45.1	49,373	-5.8%
Liberal Democrats	18	1	0	+1	42.9	30.4	33,286	-7.8%
Poole People	3	2	0	+2	7.1	8.8	9,603	+8.8%
Independent	0	0	2	-2	0	5.5	6,049	+3.8%
Labour	0	0	0	0	0	4.6	5,074	+1.0%
UKIP	0	0	0	0	0	4.4	4,812	+0.5%
Green	0	0	0	0	0	0.7	785	-0.1%
BNP	0	0	0	0	0	0.4	468	-0.4%

== Election results by ward ==
Alderney (3 seats)
Party	Candidate	Votes	%	±%
Liberal Democrats	Tony Trent	1,093		
Liberal Democrats	Lindsay Wilson	1,001		
Liberal Democrats	Charles Meachin	970		
Conservative	Philip Broadhead	815		
Conservative	Meraz Choudhury	715		
Conservative	James Vassay	638		
Labour	Joan Jones	550		
Labour	Ian Malcolm-Walker	477		
Labour	Jason Sanderson	448		
UKIP	Joan Player	394		
Independent	Brian Camfield	330		
Green	Joshua Harvey	285		
Turnout				
Liberal Democrats hold		Swing		
Liberal Democrats hold		Swing		
Liberal Democrats hold		Swing		

Branksome East (2 seats)
Party	Candidate	Votes	%	±%
Conservative	Stephen Rollo-Smith	1,008		
Conservative	Karen Rampton	1,001		
Liberal Democrats	Peter Matthews	464		
Liberal Democrats	Graham Mason	433		
UKIP	Robert Baggs	285		
Turnout				
Conservative hold		Swing		
Conservative hold		Swing		

Branksome West (2 seats)
Party	Candidate	Votes	%	±%
Liberal Democrats	Philip Eades	1,531		
Liberal Democrats	Marion Le Poidevin	1,160		
Conservative	Joyce Lavender	871		
Conservative	Malcolm Shakesby	524		
Turnout				
Liberal Democrats hold		Swing		
Liberal Democrats gain from Conservative		Swing		

Broadstone (3 seats)
Party	Candidate	Votes	%	±%
Liberal Democrats	Michael Brooke	2,559		
Liberal Democrats	Roy Godfrey	2,027		
Liberal Democrats	Vikki Slade	2,016		
Conservative	David Newell	1,994		
Conservative	Barry Smith	1,718		
Conservative	Paul Roebuck	1,684		
Green	Mark Chivers	500		
UKIP	Alan Gerring	499		
Turnout				
Liberal Democrats hold		Swing		
Liberal Democrats hold		Swing		
Liberal Democrats hold		Swing		

Canford Cliffs (3 seats)
Party	Candidate	Votes	%	±%
Conservative	May Haines	1,854		
Conservative	Niel Sorton	1,658		
Conservative	Peter Pawlowski	1,626		
Independent	Carole Deas	1,464		
Independent	Susanna Carvell	989		
Independent	Ian Walker	783		
Liberal Democrats	Michael Baker	447		
UKIP	Avril King	321		
Turnout				
Conservative hold		Swing		
Conservative hold		Swing		
Conservative gain from Independent		Swing		

Canford Heath East (2 seats)
Party	Candidate	Votes	%	±%
Liberal Democrats	Sandra Moore	1,150		
Liberal Democrats	Jennie Hodges	1,075		
Conservative	Zena Newman	564		
Conservative	Byron Quayle	529		
UKIP	Valerie Foice	351		
Turnout				
Liberal Democrats hold		Swing		
Liberal Democrats hold		Swing		

Canford Heath West (2 seats)
Party	Candidate	Votes	%	±%
Liberal Democrats	Chris Matthews	1,172		
Liberal Democrats	Phil Goodall	1,164		
Conservative	Will Burstow	819		
Conservative	Rob Way	730		
UKIP	Peter Wheat	323		
Turnout				
Liberal Democrats hold		Swing		
Liberal Democrats hold		Swing		

Creekmoor (3 seats)
Party	Candidate	Votes	%	±%
Conservative	Leslie Burden	1,515		
Conservative	Judy Butt	1,487		
Conservative	John Rampton	1,284		
Independent	Siobhan Coleman	720		
UKIP	John Butler	635		
Liberal Democrats	Eleanor Perera	591		
Liberal Democrats	Rory MacKay	587		
Turnout				
Conservative hold		Swing		
Conservative hold		Swing		
Conservative hold		Swing		

Hamworthy East (2 seats)
Party	Candidate	Votes	%	±%
Poole People	Charmaine Parkinson	728		
Conservative	Mike White	688		
Conservative	Roger Gregory	651		
Liberal Democrats	Peter England	289		
Labour	Darren Brown	283		
Liberal Democrats	Jeff Allen	278		
Labour	Andrew Sweetmore	168		
Turnout				
Conservative hold		Swing		
Poole People gain from Conservative		Swing		

Hamworthy West (2 seats)
Party	Candidate	Votes	%	±%
Conservative	Graham Chandler	778		
Conservative	Michael Wilkins	755		
Poole People	Lou Knight	654		
Labour	Pat Hicks	349		
Liberal Democrats	Max Dunnett	240		
Liberal Democrats	Jason Jones	142		
Turnout				
Conservative hold		Swing		
Conservative hold		Swing		

Merley and Bearwood (3 seats)
Party	Candidate	Votes	%	±%
Liberal Democrats	David Brown	2,054		
Liberal Democrats	Sandra Cox	2,026		
Liberal Democrats	Peter Maiden	1,976		
Conservative	Bernard Broderick	1,936		
Conservative	Jane Thomas	1,639		
Conservative	Andrew Chard	1,593		
Turnout				
Liberal Democrats hold		Swing		
Liberal Democrats hold		Swing		
Liberal Democrats hold		Swing		

Newtown (3 seats)
Party	Candidate	Votes	%	±%
Liberal Democrats	Brian Clements	1,137		
Liberal Democrats	Jo Clements	1,131		
Liberal Democrats	Graham Wilson	1,001		
Conservative	Ashley Fraser	886		
Conservative	Chris Harrison	857		
Conservative	Sonia Pedrini	820		
Labour	Hazel Malcolm-Walker	636		
UKIP	Diana Butler	527		
BNP	Dawn Coleman	264		
Independent	David Kenyon	246		
BNP	William Kimmet	204		
Turnout				
Liberal Democrats hold		Swing		
Liberal Democrats hold		Swing		
Liberal Democrats hold		Swing		

Oakdale (3 seats)
Party	Candidate	Votes	%	±%
Conservative	Ian Potter	1,264		
Conservative	Peter Adams	1,262		
Conservative	Janet Walton	1,129		
Poole People	Andy Hadley	978		
Poole People	Hugh Todd	770		
Independent	David Gillard	682		
Labour	Brian Ellis	556		
Liberal Democrats	Larry Adams	525		
Independent	Linda Gillard	464		
Labour	Sue Mallory	445		
Liberal Democrats	Alan Brooker	436		
Liberal Democrats	David Chicken	430		
Labour	Andrei Dudau	415		
UKIP	Michael Fisher	377		
Independent	Karl Ingham	371		
Turnout				
Conservative hold		Swing		
Conservative hold		Swing		
Conservative gain from Independent		Swing		

Parkstone (3 seats)
Party	Candidate	Votes	%	±%
Conservative	Sally Carpenter	2,008		
Conservative	Anne Stribley	1,764		
Conservative	Tony Woodcock	1,613		
Poole People	Sam Howell	1,500		
Liberal Democrats	Michael Nance	795		
Labour	Paul Reading	747		
UKIP	Lloyd Butt	586		
Turnout				
Conservative hold		Swing		
Conservative hold		Swing		
Conservative hold		Swing		

Penn Hill (3 seats)
Party	Candidate	Votes	%	±%
Conservative	Elaine Atkinson	1,929		
Conservative	Xena Dion	1,929		
Conservative	Ronald Parker	1,771		
Poole People	Peter Miles	1,431		
Liberal Democrats	Roy Parker	843		
UKIP	Jack Edwards	514		
Turnout				
Conservative hold		Swing		
Conservative hold		Swing		
Conservative hold		Swing		

Poole Town (3 seats)
Party	Candidate	Votes	%	±%
Poole People	Mark Howell	1,911		
Poole People	Chris Wilson	1,631		
Conservative	Carol Evans	1,015		
Conservative	Chris Bulteel	1,006		
Conservative	Tony Reeves	898		
Liberal Democrats	Dee Knights	543		
Turnout				
Conservative hold		Swing		
Poole People hold		Swing		
Poole People gain from Conservative		Swing		
