= 2015 Poole Borough Council election =

2015 UK local government election

- 7 May 2015

All 42 seats on the Poole Borough Council 22 seats needed for a majority
	First party	Second party	Third party
	Con	LD	PPP
Party	Conservative	Liberal Democrats	Poole People
Last election	21 seats, 45.10%	18 seats, 30.40%	3 seats, 8.80%
Seats won	32	6	3
Seat change	▲11	▼12	Steady
Popular vote	74,060	33,559	13,269
Percentage	42.85%	19.42%	7.68%
Swing	▼2.25pp	▼10.98pp	▼1.12pp
	Fourth party	Fifth party	Sixth party
	UKIP	GPEW	Lab
Party	UKIP	Green	Labour
Last election	0 seats, 4.40%	0 seats, 0.70%	0 seats, 4.60%
Seats won	1	0	0
Seat change	▲1	Steady	Steady
Popular vote	22,255	17,975	10,855
Percentage	12.88%	10.40%	6.28%
Swing	▲8.48pp	▲9.70pp	▲1.68pp
- Map showing the results of the election in each ward. Colours denote the winning party as shown in the main table of results.
Leader before election
Elaine Atkinson
Conservative
No overall control (Note: Conservative minority.)
Leader after election
Janet Walton
Conservative

The 2015 Poole Borough Council election took place on 7 May 2015 alongside other local elections across the United Kingdom. All 42 seats of Poole Borough Council were elected.

Prior to the election, the council was under no overall control. The Conservatives were the largest party and ran the council as a minority administration. At this election, the Conservatives gained majority control of Poole Borough Council.

Following the election, the leader of the council, Elaine Atkinson, was replaced by Janet Walton.

== Election result summary ==
Poole Borough Election Result 2015
Party	Seats	Gains	Losses	Net gain/loss	Seats %	Votes %	Votes	+/−
Conservative	32	12	1	▲11	76.19	42.85	74,060	-2.25
Liberal Democrats	6	0	12	▼12	14.86	19.42	33,559	-10.98
Poole People	3	1	1	Steady	7.14	7.68	13,269	-1.12
Independent	0	0	0	Steady	0.00	0.45	775	-5.05
Labour	0	0	0	Steady	0.00	6.28	10,855	+1.68
UKIP	1	1	0	▲1	2.38	12.88	22,255	+8.48
Green	0	0	0	Steady	0.00	10.40	17,975	+9.7
Other parties	0	0	0	Steady	0.00	0.04	87	N/A

== Election results by ward ==
An asterisk indicates an incumbent seeking re-election.

=== Alderney ===
Alderney (3 seats)
Party	Candidate	Votes	%	±%
UKIP	Mike Fisher	1,456		
Conservative	Louise Russell	1,391		
Conservative	Russell Trent	1,349		
Liberal Democrats	Tony Trent (Note: Elected as a Conservative but subsequently resigned from the party and is now an Independent.)	1323		
Liberal Democrats	Helen Ross	1152		
Liberal Democrats	Richard Wilson	1036		
Labour	Daniel Brooks	806		
Labour	Sue Mallory	759		
Labour	Jason Sanderson	700		
Green	Hannah Chislett	475		
Green	Simon Riggs	434		
Green	Henry Stockdale	333		
Independent	Ian Northover	139		
Turnout				
UKIP gain from Liberal Democrats		Swing		
Conservative gain from Liberal Democrats		Swing		
Conservative gain from Liberal Democrats		Swing		

=== Branksome East ===
Branksome East (2 seats)
Party	Candidate	Votes	%	±%
Conservative	Drew Mellor	1,613		
Conservative	Karen Rampton*	1,535		
UKIP	Ken Chambers	565		
UKIP	Robert Pattemore	513		
Labour	Liz Dixon	471		
Liberal Democrats	Annette Kent	411		
Labour	Stephen Sampson	398		
Green	Laura Cousins	345		
Liberal Democrats	Chris Li	306		
Green	J R Ryan	262		
Turnout				
Conservative hold		Swing		
Conservative hold		Swing		

=== Branksome West ===
Branksome West (2 seats)
Party	Candidate	Votes	%	±%
Liberal Democrats	Philip Eades*	1,316		
Liberal Democrats	Marion Le Poidevin*	991		
Conservative	Lucy Cooper	830		
Conservative	Stanley Peters	775		
UKIP	Mike Browning	755		
UKIP	Steve Sheppard	741		
Green	Julie Dinmore	484		
Green	Martin Price	404		
Turnout				
Liberal Democrats hold		Swing		
Liberal Democrats hold		Swing		

=== Broadstone ===
Broadstone (3 seats)
Party	Candidate	Votes	%	±%
Liberal Democrats	Michael Brooke*	3,534		
Conservative	David Newell	2,842		
Conservative	Joanne Tomlin	2,547		
Liberal Democrats	Roy Godfrey*	2262		
Liberal Democrats	Don Hudswell	2097		
Conservative	Marc Ujvari	2027		
UKIP	Alan Gerring	909		
UKIP	Barry Smith	808		
Green	Mark Chivers	519		
Green	Helen Highwater	417		
Green	Kellie Blake	371		
Turnout				
Liberal Democrats hold		Swing		
Conservative gain from Liberal Democrats		Swing		
Conservative gain from Liberal Democrats		Swing		

=== Canford Cliffs ===
Canford Cliffs (3 seats)
Party	Candidate	Votes	%	±%
Conservative	May Haines*	3,658		
Conservative	Peter Pawlowski*	3,546		
Conservative	Mohan Iyengar	3,134		
UKIP	Jacqueline Bigwood	880		
UKIP	Geoff Chidley	876		
Liberal Democrats	Michael Baker	827		
Green	Kate Rose	539		
Labour	Peter Kenyon	376		
Green	Martin Davies	348		
Labour	Kenneth May	334		
Green	Helen Thomas	306		
Turnout				
Conservative hold		Swing		
Conservative hold		Swing		
Conservative hold		Swing		

=== Canford Heath East ===
Canford Heath East (2 seats)
Party	Candidate	Votes	%	±%
Liberal Democrats	Sandra Moore*	1,339		
Liberal Democrats	Jennifer Hodges*	1,331		
Conservative	Michael Bowman	1064		
Conservative	Andrew Tomlin	899		
UKIP	Zac Stanworth	795		
Green	Hannah Maxwell-Harrison	267		
Green	Dean Maxwell-Harrison	215		
Turnout				
Liberal Democrats hold		Swing		
Liberal Democrats hold		Swing		

=== Canford Heath West ===
Canford Heath West (2 seats)
Party	Candidate	Votes	%	±%
Conservative	Sean Gabriel	1,321		
Conservative	Ray Tindle	1,200		
Liberal Democrats	Chris Matthews*	1122		
Liberal Democrats	Peter Parrish	927		
UKIP	John Hawkins	666		
UKIP	Dominic Turner	497		
Labour	Roger Wyatt	307		
Green	Alison Challis	271		
Green	Matthew Burgess	166		
Money Free Party	Nick Tapping	87		
Turnout				
Conservative gain from Liberal Democrats		Swing		
Conservative gain from Liberal Democrats		Swing		

=== Creekmoor ===
Creekmoor (3 seats)
Party	Candidate	Votes	%	±%
Conservative	Judy Butt*	2,286		
Conservative	Les Burden*	2,203		
Conservative	John Rampton*	1,742		
UKIP	Gareth Cook	1176		
UKIP	Heather Jones	1041		
Liberal Democrats	Paul Slade	836		
Liberal Democrats	Jack Blankley	750		
Liberal Democrats	Millie Earl	735		
Green	Arron Blake	518		
Green	Marian Bryant	487		
Green	Robin Bryant	418		
Turnout				
Conservative hold		Swing		
Conservative hold		Swing		
Conservative hold		Swing		

=== Hamworthy East ===
Hamworthy East (2 seats)
Party	Candidate	Votes	%	±%
Conservative	Mike White*	971		
Conservative	Vishal Gupta	803		
UKIP	James Jones	698		
Poole People	Charmaine Parkinson*	697		
Poole People	Lou Knight	633		
Labour	Shirley Brooks	306		
Liberal Democrats	Brian Foster	249		
Labour	John Sullivan	235		
Green	Ian Hay	175		
Green	Michael Challis	150		
Turnout				
Conservative hold		Swing		
Conservative gain from Poole People		Swing		

=== Hamworthy West ===
Hamworthy West (2 seats)
Party	Candidate	Votes	%	±%
Conservative	Mike Wilkins*	1,197		
Poole People	Julie Bagwell	1,085		
Conservative	Karen Bozeat	886		
Liberal Democrats	Maxine Dunnett	372		
Labour	Ben Feiner	368		
Labour	Jo Oldale	289		
Green	Colin Dilley	207		
Green	Claire Newton	205		
Turnout				
Conservative hold		Swing		
Poole People gain from Conservative		Swing		

=== Merley and Bearwood ===
Merley and Bearwood (3 seats)
Party	Candidate	Votes	%	±%
Liberal Democrats	David Brown*	2,579		
Conservative	Jane Newell	2,389		
Conservative	Marion Pope	2,332		
Conservative	Roger Gregory	2284		
Liberal Democrats	Ken Swash	1910		
Liberal Democrats	May Newman	1661		
UKIP	John Butler	1102		
Green	Wayland Goodliffe	458		
Green	Gigi Sismaet	454		
Independent	Peter Kazmierczak	377		
Green	Emmajay Walsh	312		
Turnout				
Liberal Democrats hold		Swing		
Conservative gain from Liberal Democrats		Swing		
Conservative gain from Liberal Democrats		Swing		

=== Newtown ===
Newtown (3 seats)
Party	Candidate	Votes	%	±%
Conservative	Graham Wilson (Note: Graham Wilson represented Newtown for the Liberal Democrats before crossing the floor to join the Conservatives, whereas Lindsay Wilson had previously represented Alderney for the Liberal Democrats.)	1,779		
Conservative	Lindsay Wilson	1,605		
Conservative	Malcolm Farrell	1,575		
UKIP	Diana Butler	1396		
Liberal Democrats	Brian Clements	1162		
Liberal Democrats	Jo Clements	1082		
Liberal Democrats	David Yates	846		
Labour	Steve Brew	838		
Labour	Hazel Malcolm-Walker	733		
Green	Faye Cunningham	655		
Labour	Ian Malcolm-Walker	637		
Green	Adrian Oliver	490		
Green	David Genese	446		
Turnout				
Conservative gain from Liberal Democrats		Swing		
Conservative gain from Liberal Democrats		Swing		
Conservative gain from Liberal Democrats		Swing		

=== Oakdale ===
Oakdale (3 seats)
Party	Candidate	Votes	%	±%
Conservative	Peter Adams*	2,080		
Conservative	Ian Potter*	2,051		
Conservative	Janet Walton*	1,725		
UKIP	Janice Long	1335		
UKIP	Larry Adams	1325		
Poole People	Hugh Todd	1124		
Liberal Democrats	Tansy Earl	851		
Labour	Brian Ellis	830		
Liberal Democrats	Ems Simpson	641		
Green	Ben Skipp	585		
Green	Richard Turner	506		
Green	Christopher Welch	452		
Turnout				
Conservative hold		Swing		
Conservative hold		Swing		
Conservative hold		Swing		

=== Parkstone ===
Parkstone (3 seats)
Party	Candidate	Votes	%	±%
Conservative	Anne Stribley	2,297		
Conservative	Emma Williams	2,120		
Conservative	John Challinor	2,059		
Poole People	Steve Baron	1645		
Poole People	Gareth Jones	1359		
UKIP	Bob Lister	952		
Liberal Democrats	Paul Dredge	951		
Green	Rupert Barrington	848		
UKIP	Tony Woodcock	789		
Labour	Maureen Champness	785		
Green	Pamela Jefferies	687		
Green	James Rose	581		
Independent	Marty Caine	259		
Turnout				
Conservative hold		Swing		
Conservative hold		Swing		
Conservative hold		Swing		

=== Penn Hill ===
Penn Hill (3 seats)
Party	Candidate	Votes	%	±%
Conservative	Elaine Atkinson*	2,498		
Conservative	Ron Parker*	2,198		
Conservative	Xena Dion*	2,131		
Poole People	Sally Carpenter	1362		
Poole People	Nicola Jinks	1039		
Liberal Democrats	Robin Rennison	801		
Labour	Martin Holst	752		
Green	Simon Card	745		
UKIP	David Darling	717		
UKIP	Lyn Thomas	695		
Green	Julie Millar	651		
Green	Philip Mayer	437		
Turnout				
Conservative hold		Swing		
Conservative hold		Swing		
Conservative hold		Swing		

=== Poole Town ===
Poole Town (3 seats)
Party	Candidate	Votes	%	±%
Poole People	Mark Howell*	1,614		
Conservative	Andy Garner-Watts	1,418		
Poole People	Andy Hadley	1,395		
Poole People	Chris Wilson*	1316		
Liberal Democrats	Andrew Ross	1159		
Conservative	Alvin Gunputh	1157		
Labour	Darren Brown	931		
UKIP	Colin Johnson	796		
UKIP	Chris Ramm	772		
Conservative	Andy Ross	543		
Green	Jon Knight	495		
Green	Carolyn Smith	468		
Green	Ben Pantling	389		
Turnout				
Poole People hold		Swing		
Conservative hold		Swing		
Poole People hold		Swing		

== By-elections 2015-2019 ==
=== Broadstone By-Election 2016 ===
The by-election was called after Joanne Tomlin resigned as a Councillor due to personal issues. It was held on 13 October 2016.

Broadstone
Party	Candidate	Votes	%	±%
Liberal Democrats	Vikki Slade	2,184	69.56	
Conservative	Marc Ujvari	733	23.34	
UKIP	Alan Gerring	121	3.85	
Green	Mark Chivers	57	1.82	
Labour	Jason Sanderson	45	1.43	
Turnout		3138	37.23	
Liberal Democrats gain from Conservative		Swing		
