= Poole Borough Council =

Former English unitary authority council

- Coat of arms

- Council logo

Type
- Type: Unitary authority

History
- Founded: 1 April 1974
- Succeeded by: Bournemouth, Christchurch and Poole Council

Structure
- Length of term: Whole council elected every four years

Elections
- Voting system: Plurality-at-large
- Last election: 7 May 2015

Meeting place
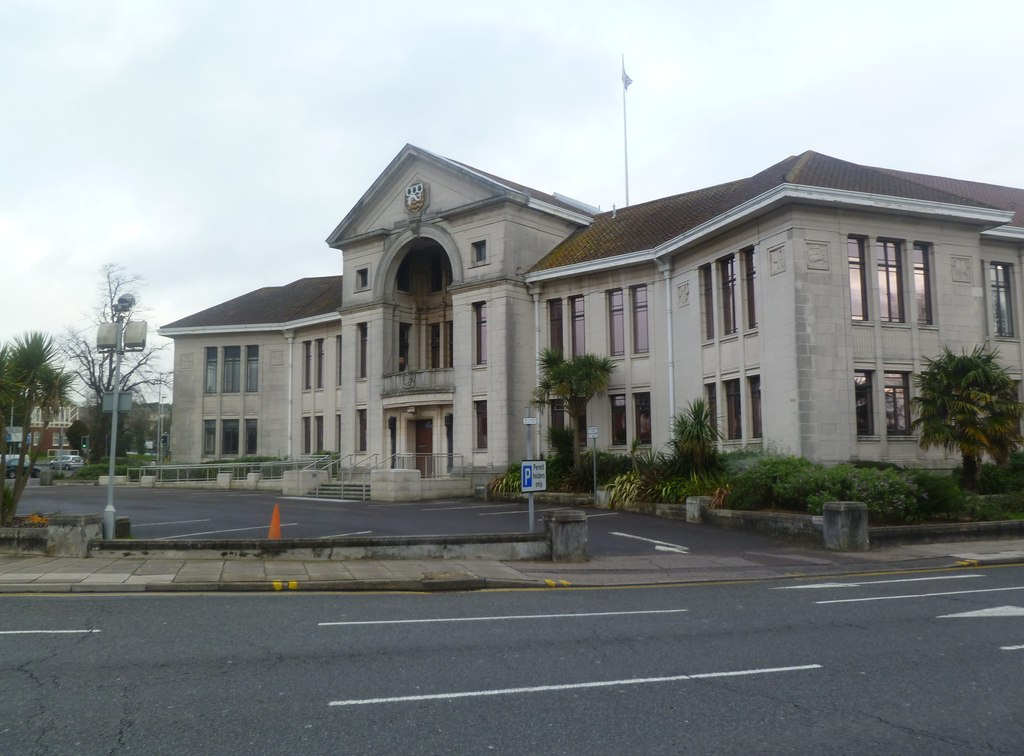
- Poole Civic Centre

Website
- www.poole.gov.uk

Poole Borough Council was the unitary authority responsible for local government in the Borough of Poole, Dorset, England. It was created on 1 April 1997 following a review by the Local Government Commission for England (1992), becoming administratively independent from Dorset County Council, and ceased to exist on 1 April 2019. Its council comprised 16 wards and 42 councillors and was controlled by a Conservative administration before it was merged into Bournemouth, Christchurch and Poole Council.

The council was based at Poole Civic Centre.

In February 2018 the 'Future Dorset' plan was approved by the Secretary of State for Housing, Communities and Local Government Sajid Javid, which meant that Bournemouth, Christchurch and Poole borough councils were merged into one unitary authority in April 2019.

== Composition ==
42 councillors were elected across 16 wards and there were elections every four years. The last election, in May 2015, resulted in a Conservative majority. The Mayor was Sean Gabriel, a Conservative councillor for the Canford Heath West ward since May 2015. The council was made up of 32 Conservative, 6 Liberal Democrat 3 Poole People and 1 UKIP councillors. After the election, a Conservative administration was formed with a cabinet of seven councillors who were responsible for deciding how the council's strategies and policies were implemented and how the budget was spent. The Council Leader was Janet Walton (Conservative).

=== Wards ===
Ward	Number of seats
Alderney	3
Branksome East	2
Branksome West	2
Broadstone	3
Canford Cliffs	3
Canford Heath East	2
Canford Heath West	2
Creekmoor	3
Hamworthy East	2
Hamworthy West	2
Merley and Bearwood	3
Newtown	3
Oakdale	3
Parkstone	3
Penn Hill	3
Poole Town	3

== Unlawful use of surveillance ==
For three weeks in 2008 the Council carried out unlawful surveillance on a family following an allegation that they were living outside a particular school catchment area. The surveillance was carried out by one of Poole Borough Council's education officers, who followed the family's movements for 24 consecutive days between 10 February and 4 March 2008. Tim Martin, the council's head of legal services, authorised the surveillance and initially argued that it was justified under the Regulation of Investigatory Powers Act 2000, set up to counter serious crime, including terrorism. However, at a subsequent tribunal, the council's actions were ruled unlawful on multiple grounds: there was nothing, for instance, to suggest that the family's three young children had committed any criminal act, yet they were still made targets of the surveillance. The tribunal also ruled that the surveillance "was not proportionate and could not reasonably have been believed to be proportionate". The Council said that it accepted the judgment "fully".
