= List of Four Rooms episodes =

This is an episode list for Four Rooms. All dates are the first broadcast in the United Kingdom.

== Series overview ==
Series	Episodes	Originally released	
Series	Episodes	First released	Last released
1	8	24 May 2011	12 July 2011
2	8	21 March 2012	20 May 2012
3	30	29 April 2013	20 September 2013
4	30	18 May 2014	28 November 2015
5	20	22 August 2016	23 November 2019

== Episodes ==
=== Series 1 (2011) ===
No. overall	No. in series	Title	Dealers	Original release date
1	1	"Episode 1"	Andrew Lamberty, Emma Hawkins, Gordon Watson, Jeff Salmon	24 May 2011
The first episode of the series features a collection of Christmas cards from Princess Diana to her personal chef, an original 1960s Dalek, a cigar owned by Winston Churchill, and a Francis Bacon portrait all but destroyed by the artist.
2	2	"Episode 2"	Andrew Lamberty, Emma Hawkins, Gordon Watson, Jeff Salmon	31 May 2011
Best friends Bradley Ridge and Nick Loizou bring a four-tonne concrete wall to Four Rooms, complete with a mural by artist Banksy. They want a six-figure sum, but will they see eye-to-eye with the dealers, and each other? Meanwhile, retired policeman Stewart Evans wants big money for his gruesome Victorian hangman's rope, and the nose cone from a Concorde plane is on offer.
3	3	"Episode 3"	Andrew Lamberty, Emma Hawkins, Gordon Watson, Jeff Salmon	7 June 2011
The dealers have to decide how much to offer for a Tracey Emin print owned by her twin brother; a gruesome piece of tattooed skin pickled in a jar; a rare Beatles poster from the 60s; and a vintage penny arcade electric-shock machine. Will any of them make their owners rich?
4	4	"Episode 4"	Andrew Lamberty, Emma Hawkins, Gordon Watson, Jeff Salmon	14 June 2011
A Victorian seven-foot stuffed turtle, erotic photos, a Sean Connery James Bond suit, and a collection of hats by the queen of punk, Vivienne Westwood. Will any of them bring their owners the cash they want?
5	5	"Episode 5"	Andrew Lamberty, Emma Hawkins, Gordon Watson, Jeff Salmon	21 June 2011
The dealers have to decide how much to offer for a guitar belonging to punk legend Dee Dee Ramone, one of British artists Gilbert and George's famous gin bottles, a lifetime collection of over 1000 matchbox cars, and circus impresario Gerry Cottle's miniature zoo.
6	6	"Episode 6"	Andrew Lamberty, Emma Hawkins, Gordon Watson, Jeff Salmon	28 June 2011
This episode features a bar designed for Sir Elton John by shoe designer Patrick Cox; a million-year-old fossil; and a collection of candid photos of the stars of the 60s, from Barbara Windsor to Roger Moore. Will they make their owners a fortune?
7	7	"Episode 7"	Andrew Lamberty, Emma Hawkins, Gordon Watson, Jeff Salmon	5 July 2011
Could a rare painting by Marilyn Monroe, a life-size mechanical baby elephant, a collection of bizarre celebrity memorabilia or a collection of stuffed frogs make someone rich?
8	8	"Episode 8"	Andrew Lamberty, Emma Hawkins, Gordon Watson, Jeff Salmon	12 July 2011
The final episode in the series features a bottle of wine owned by George Best, a mummified mermaid, a collection of Playboy memorabilia, and the death mask of a Victorian murderer. Will any of the owners sell for a fortune?

=== Series 2 (2012) ===
No. overall	No. in series	Title	Dealers	Original release date
9	1	"Episode 1"	Andrew Lamberty, Celia Sawyer, Gordon Watson, Jeff Salmon	21 March 2012
Can the chair on which J. K. Rowling wrote Harry Potter, the original music score for Psycho, artwork by Marlon Brando, Francis Bacon's paint brushes or an antique dildo make their owners rich?
10	2	"Episode 2"	Andrew Lamberty, Celia Sawyer, Gordon Watson, Jeff Salmon	28 March 2012
Can a dress worn by Amy Winehouse, a bottle of champagne signed by the Ashes-winning cricket team, a waxwork autopsy, a slice of the Queen and Prince Philip's wedding cake, or Kate Middleton's car make their owners a life-changing sum of money?
11	3	"Episode 3"	Andrew Lamberty, Celia Sawyer, Gordon Watson, Jeff Salmon	4 April 2012
Can tiles featured on the Beatles' Abbey Road album cover, original artwork from Reservoir Dogs, Ku Klux Klan costumes or Richard Burton's fur coat earn their owners life-changing money?
12	4	"Episode 4"	Andrew Lamberty, Celia Sawyer, Gordon Watson, Jeff Salmon	11 April 2012
The dealers get a chance to bid for Katie Price and Peter Andre's wedding carriage, paintings by the Kray twins, Dracula author Bram Stoker's desk and artwork by Damien Hirst.
13	5	"Episode 5"	Andrew Lamberty, Celia Sawyer, Gordon Watson, Jeff Salmon	18 April 2012
Can Napoleon's death mask, a pair of woolly mammoth tusks, a giant Polaroid by Bob Carlos Clarke or a 1920s chandelier earn their owners life-changing sums of money?
14	6	"Episode 6"	Andrew Lamberty, Celia Sawyer, Gordon Watson, Jeff Salmon	25 April 2012
This episode features a wallet made from the skin of the hand of notorious Edinburgh bodysnatcher William Burke; and a 19th-century Nepalese witchdoctor's outfit complete with spirit catcher and ritual dagger, given directly to the seller by a Shaman family. Plus a graduation artwork by young British artist Jake Chapman, which the seller bought in the 1980s for just £50; and a giant elephant bird egg – 180 times larger than a hen's egg, it was laid by the biggest bird that ever lived.
15	7	"Episode 7"	Andrew Lamberty, Celia Sawyer, Gordon Watson, Jeff Salmon	2 May 2012
The dealers bid for six original dresses made by the late Alexander McQueen, including a design piece for Sarah Jessica Parker; a bespoke gold Rolex watch made for the Sultan of Oman containing 300 diamonds and 27 rubies; a boxing glove worn by Muhammad Ali; and a shocking artwork depicting the gates of Auschwitz, which the artist claims is made partly from the gold teeth of Holocaust victims.
16	8	"Episode 8"	Andrew Lamberty, Celia Sawyer, Gordon Watson, Jeff Salmon	20 May 2012
This episode features Winston Churchill's gold dentures, which were designed to preserve the lisp made famous by his rousing speeches during the Second World War; a chastity belt that the seller believes dates back to the 16th century; an enormous modern rocking library; prison artwork by Britain's most notorious prisoner Charles Bronson, being sold by one of his pen pals; three 19th-century Viennese erotic bronzes; and artwork made from US dollar bills by celebrity tattooist Scott Campbell.

=== Series 3 (2013) ===
No. overall	No. in series	Title	Dealers	Original release date
17	1	"Episode 1"	Alex Proud, Celia Sawyer, Gordon Watson, Johnny Elichaoff	29 April 2013
Can sculptures smaller than the end of a pencil, a seat from Highbury stadium or couture clothing made from roadkill tempt the dealers?
18	2	"Episode 2"	David Sonnenthal, Peter Ratcliffe, Raj Bisram, Tamara Beckwith	30 April 2013
How much will dealers David Sonnenthal, Peter Ratcliffe, Tamara Beckwith and Raj Bisram offer for Muhammad Ali's boots, a glove worn by Laurence Olivier, Versace sketches and a rhino head?
19	3	"Episode 3"	Maurice Amdur, Shaun Clarkson, Tom Bolt, Wendy Meakin	1 May 2013
Fred Astaire's suitcases, a Dali sculpture, a dress made from car parts and a rare Patek watch are amongst the collectables members of the public are hoping to exchange for life-changing sums.
20	4	"Episode 4"	Alex Proud, Celia Sawyer, Gordon Watson, Johnny Elichaoff	2 May 2013
Fred Astaire's suitcases, a Dali sculpture, a dress made from car parts and a rare Patek watch are amongst the collectables members of the public are hoping to exchange for life-changing sums.
21	5	"Episode 5"	David Sonnenthal, Peter Ratcliffe, Raj Bisram, Tamara Beckwith	3 May 2013
How much will David Sonnenthal, Peter Ratcliffe, Tamara Beckwith and Raj Bisram offer for Nelson's will, an original Wembley seat, Danny La Rue's dresses and a seven-legged lamb?
22	6	"Episode 6"	Maurice Amdur, Shaun Clarkson, Tom Bolt, Wendy Meakin	6 May 2013
Shaun Clarkson, Tom Bolt, Wendy Meakin and Maurice Amdur are tempted by, among other things, two diamond encrusted guitars, a rare music box, a Victorian fire screen and a unique, very rare film poster for the movie Thunderball.
23	7	"Episode 7"	Alex Proud, Celia Sawyer, Gordon Watson, Johnny Elichaoff	7 May 2013
Alex Proud, Gordon Watson, Celia Sawyer and Johnny Elichaoff are tempted by, among other things, rare political photographs, a book of the occult and a Neolithic axe.
24	8	"Episode 8"	David Sonnenthal, Peter Ratcliffe, Raj Bisram, Tamara Beckwith	13 May 2013
Can members of the public earn life-changing sums for the Queen Mother's handbag, a guitar signed by the Rolling Stones or a hat placed on top of Nelson's Column during the Olympics?
25	9	"Episode 9"	Maurice Amdur, Shaun Clarkson, Tom Bolt, Wendy Meakin	14 May 2013
How much will the dealers offer for a self-portrait by The Who bassist John Entwistle, a Star Wars arcade machine, a rare pocket watch and a large copper octopus?
26	10	"Episode 10"	Alex Proud, Celia Sawyer, Gordon Watson, Johnny Elichaoff	20 May 2013
Will any of the dealers be tempted by rare and personal Kate Bush memorabilia, two beautiful wooden swans or a wallet said to have belonged to Oliver Cromwell?
27	11	"Episode 11"	David Sonnenthal, Peter Ratcliffe, Raj Bisram, Tamara Beckwith	21 May 2013
Can any of the members of the public secure life-changing sums of money in return for a script from Star Wars, an armistice message from World War I or a rare pistol from the Titanic?
28	12	"Episode 12"	Maurice Amdur, Shaun Clarkson, Tom Bolt, Wendy Meakin	22 May 2013
Can any of the members of the public secure life-changing sums of money in return for one of the first flushing public toilets, a mannequin lamp, a Miro painting or the Queen... in stone?
29	13	"Episode 13"	David Sonnenthal, Peter Ratcliffe, Raj Bisram, Tamara Beckwith	23 May 2013
Will any of the dealers be tempted by an early seaside girlie machine, a sketch by Andy Warhol, the skeleton of a cave bear or a giant ammonite?
30	14	"Episode 14"	Maurice Amdur, Shaun Clarkson, Tom Bolt, Wendy Meakin	24 May 2013
Will any of the dealers be tempted by a scooter signed by the 'Modfather' Paul Weller, two Spitting Image puppets or an original telegraph about the Titanic sinking?
31	15	"Episode 15"	Alex Proud, Celia Sawyer, Gordon Watson, Johnny Elichaoff	7 June 2013
Alex Proud, Gordon Watson, Celia Sawyer and Johnny Elichaoff are tempted by, among other things, a textbook signed by Diana, the Princess of Wales, vintage ski posters, and jewels said to have been found in the tomb of the Buddha.
32	16	"Episode 16"	Maurice Amdur, Shaun Clarkson, Tom Bolt, Wendy Meakin	14 June 2013
Will the dealers be tempted by a Tornado nose-cone, a watch said to have been owned by Jack the Ripper or a training bomb?
33	17	"Episode 17"	David Sonnenthal, Peter Ratcliffe, Raj Bisram, Tamara Beckwith	21 June 2013
Can a rare silver bottle, Alec Guinness's hat, posters from Muhammad Ali's iconic fights or a Banksy mural tempt the dealers to offer members of the public life-changing sums of money?
34	18	"Episode 18"	Alex Proud, Celia Sawyer, Gordon Watson, Johnny Elichaoff	28 June 2013
Can some rare Matchbox cars, a World War II battery box, a necklace made from human hair or two rare stone cherubs from St Paul's Cathedral earn their owners life-changing sums of money?
35	19	"Episode 19"	Maurice Amdur, Shaun Clarkson, Tom Bolt, Wendy Meakin	5 July 2013
Will the dealers be tempted to offer members of the public life-changing sums of money for a model fire engine, a Jaws script or a very rare Louis Vuitton trunk?
36	20	"Episode 20"	David Sonnenthal, Peter Ratcliffe, Raj Bisram, Tamara Beckwith	12 July 2013
Will a state crown, an Andy Warhol Polaroid, an original Elvis poster or a unique table made from a Spitfire earn their owners life-changing sums of money?
37	21	"Episode 21"	Alex Proud, Celia Sawyer, Gordon Watson, Johnny Elichaoff	19 July 2013
Will Alex Proud, Gordon Watson, Celia Sawyer or Johnny Elichaoff offer big money for a 16th-century silver figure, a rare processional cross or a dress worn by a Lady Gaga waxwork?
38	22	"Episode 22"	Maurice Amdur, Shaun Clarkson, Tom Bolt, Wendy Meakin	26 July 2013
Can rare Buddhist scrolls, a two-headed pheasant, Lord of the Rings first editions or a very rare Hermès bag earn their owners life-changing sums of money?
39	23	"Episode 23"	David Sonnenthal, Peter Ratcliffe, Raj Bisram, Tamara Beckwith	2 August 2013
Can a paper peacock, a Gilbert and George glass or Usain Bolt's running shoes tempt the dealers to part with life-changing sums of money?
40	24	"Episode 24"	Alex Proud, Celia Sawyer, Gordon Watson, Johnny Elichaoff	9 August 2013
Can a Banksy print, a Spice Girl outfit or stencil art from the urban artist Pure Evil earn their owners life-changing sums of money?
41	25	"Episode 25"	Maurice Amdur, Shaun Clarkson, Tom Bolt, Wendy Meakin	16 August 2013
Will the dealers offer big money for a telegram about the sinking of the Titanic, a collection of Elton John's suits, a rare printer's chest or a Thomas Weaver painting?
42	26	"Episode 26"	David Sonnenthal, Peter Ratcliffe, Raj Bisram, Tamara Beckwith	23 August 2013
Can a glove worn by Rocky Marciano, hats worn by Michael Jackson, a clock once owned by Elton John or a T-shirt worn by Arnold Schwarzenegger in Terminator 2 earn their owners big money?
43	27	"Episode 27"	Alex Proud, Celia Sawyer, Gordon Watson, Johnny Elichaoff	30 August 2013
The dealers are tempted by, among other things, a chair made from human hair, a Royal portrait, human Airfix art and one of the first British passports.
44	28	"Episode 28"	Maurice Amdur, Shaun Clarkson, Tom Bolt, Wendy Meakin	6 September 2013
Shaun Clarkson, Tom Bolt, Wendy Meakin and Maurice Amdur are tempted by, amongst other things, rare House of Commons menus, a painting of the Manchester derby, an antique penny-farthing and a very bling fountain pen.
45	29	"Episode 29"	David Sonnenthal, Peter Ratcliffe, Raj Bisram, Tamara Beckwith	13 September 2013
Will any of the dealers be tempted by a textbook once owned by Florence Nightingale, a weapon of mass destruction or a rare, controversial image of John Lennon?
46	30	"Episode 30"	Alex Proud, Celia Sawyer, Gordon Watson, Johnny Elichaoff	20 September 2013
Will any of the dealers be tempted by rare Doctor Who artwork, a drum skin signed by Elvis Presley and Frank Sinatra, or a fireplace that was once owned by JRR Tolkien?

=== Series 4 (2014–15) ===
No. overall	No. in series	Title	Dealers	Original release date
47	1	"Episode 1"	Alex Proud, Celia Sawyer, David Sonnenthal, Gordon Watson	18 May 2014
Gordon Watson, Celia Sawyer, Alex Proud and David Sonnenthal fight it out over a punchbag owned by Muhammad Ali, a Bee Gees guitar, some giant angel wings, a unique armchair, and a mysterious portrait painting with a six-figure price tag.
48	2	"Episode 2"	Jeff Salmon, Wendy Meakin, Raj Bisram, Peter Ratcliffe	25 May 2014
Dealers lock horns over a unique solid silver American football helmet, a rare Rolling Stones LP signed by Andy Warhol, a Christ sculpture, an antique big cat skull and a full-size replica of the time-travelling DeLorean sports car from Back to the Future.
49	3	"Episode 3"	Alex Proud, Celia Sawyer, David Sonnenthal, Gordon Watson	1 June 2014
The dealers play mind games over a retro arcade machine, and are enthralled by a rare collection of Tolkien first edition books. Celebrity sports kit and show-stopping shoes also entice the dealers to dig deep into their pockets.
50	4	"Episode 4"	Jeff Salmon, Wendy Meakin, Raj Bisram, Peter Ratcliffe	8 June 2014
The dealers battle it out over a Cold War code breaking machine, some one-off photos of rock celebrity Pete Doherty's house and a sci-fi sculpture. Can they also be coaxed into parting with their cash for a tantric figure and rare Russian nude painting?
51	5	"Episode 5"	Alex Proud, Celia Sawyer, David Sonnenthal, Gordon Watson	15 June 2014
The dealers fight it out over a pair of Muhammad Ali's boxing boots, and go head to head over some antique big cat taxidermy. Also tempting them to spend big are explosive and provocative sculptures, and original artworks from hit horror films.
52	6	"Episode 6"	Jeff Salmon, Wendy Meakin, Raj Bisram, Peter Ratcliffe	22 February 2015
Will any of the dealers be tempted by Andy Murray's tennis racket, a piece of Admiral Nelson's ship HMS Victory, artworks by Lucian Freud and Francis Bacon, or some cutting-edge jet furniture?
53	7	"Episode 7"	Jeff Salmon, Wendy Meakin, Raj Bisram, Peter Ratcliffe	1 March 2015
The dealers go head to head over Lord Lucan's pistol, Star Wars film set memorabilia, a stark photo of Damien Hirst's family, and one of the world's greatest magic tricks.
54	8	"Episode 8"	Alex Proud, Celia Sawyer, David Sonnenthal, Gordon Watson	15 March 2015
The dealers make a play for a lock of Napoleon Bonaparte's hair, recycled haute couture worn by Dita Von Teese, an erotic chess set, and artworks that put a different spin on pop culture
55	9	"Episode 9"	Alex Proud, Celia Sawyer, David Sonnenthal, Gordon Watson	8 July 2015
The dealers bid for an Elvis Presley photo album, artwork made in space and a bronze skeleton.
56	10	"Episode 10"	Jeff Salmon, Wendy Meakin, Raj Bisram, Peter Ratcliffe	15 July 2015
Items up for the dealers to grab include a gift collection from Frank Sinatra, a two headed cow and sketches by David Hockney.
57	11	"Episode 11"	Alex Proud, Celia Sawyer, David Sonnenthal, Gordon Watson	22 July 2015
This episode includes rare Art Deco sketches, a Soviet ejector seat and the body cast of an Olympian.
58	12	"Episode 12"	Jeff Salmon, Wendy Meakin, Raj Bisram, Peter Ratcliffe	29 July 2015
The dealers bid for items including a giant opal stone, a special guitar and a Tottenham Hotspur sign.
59	13	"Episode 13"	Alex Proud, Celia Sawyer, David Sonnenthal, Gordon Watson	5 August 2015
The dealers bid on Morecambe and Wise memorabilia, some high-spec Cold War binoculars, Agatha Christie's dolls, a puzzle cabinet and a pair of prehistoric animal horns.
60	14	"Episode 14"	Jeff Salmon, Wendy Meakin, Raj Bisram, Peter Ratcliffe	12 August 2015
The dealers bid for artwork by Nelson Mandela, The Who bass player John Entwistle's platinum disc, a cutting-edge chair, Michael Caine's jacket, and original sketches by Alfred Wainwright.
61	15	"Episode 15"	Alex Proud, Celia Sawyer, David Sonnenthal, Gordon Watson	19 August 2015
The dealers compete for a unique collection of Beatles photos, a rare signed Sylvia Plath book, a Japanese vase, an artwork made from butterflies and bird wings, and a handbag designed for Madonna.
62	16	"Episode 16"	Jeff Salmon, Wendy Meakin, Raj Bisram, Peter Ratcliffe	26 August 2015
Can members of the public convince the dealers to spend big on a screen-worn James Bond shirt, a World Cup 1966 programme, star-signed ballet shoes, vintage movie posters and designer chairs?
63	17	"Episode 17"	Alex Proud, Celia Sawyer, David Sonnenthal, Gordon Watson	2 September 2015
The dealers bid for a pillow signed by Michael Jackson, an antique Chinese wedding chest, a cast-off from an Anthony Gormley sculpture, a brain surgery kit, and nature sketches by a young Irish artist.
64	18	"Episode 18"	Jeff Salmon, Wendy Meakin, Raj Bisram, Peter Ratcliffe	9 September 2015
The dealers bid for Reggie Kray's prison paintings, Elvis Presley's army cap, rare wartime casting books of British film stars, a seductive chaise longue and stage memorabilia from Oasis's heyday.
65	19	"Episode 19"	Alex Proud, Celia Sawyer, David Sonnenthal, Gordon Watson	16 September 2015
The dealers bid for Jackie Kennedy's maternity dress, a giant automaton, a Masonic punch bowl, a precious piece of Arts and Crafts silverware and a claimed original spacecraft model from Blake's 7.
66	20	"Episode 20"	Jeff Salmon, Wendy Meakin, Raj Bisram, Peter Ratcliffe	23 September 2015
The dealers bid for a dress created by Marilyn Monroe's favourite designer, Australian Aboriginal weaponry, racing gloves worn by Princess Diana and a signed set of snooker balls.
67	21	"Episode 21"	Alex Proud, Celia Sawyer, David Sonnenthal, Gordon Watson	6 November 2015
The dealers bid for an Andy Warhol artwork, an antique Indian pendant, a neon sign with bling appeal, Maurice Chevalier's grand piano and an Oasis Brit Award.
68	22	"Episode 22"	Jeff Salmon, Wendy Meakin, Raj Bisram, Peter Ratcliffe	7 November 2015
Can members of the public tempt the dealers with rare Noddy books, a rocking chair fashioned from fish, a 1950s saxophone, some Lichtenstein pop art, or the Spice Girls' bus?
69	23	"Episode 23"	Alex Proud, Celia Sawyer, David Sonnenthal, Gordon Watson	13 November 2015
The dealers bid on a Salvador Dalí crystal sculpture, a designer celluloid film screen, Vinnie Jones' jacket, a cutting-edge bronze table and Edward VIII's military possessions.
70	24	"Episode 24"	Jeff Salmon, Wendy Meakin, Raj Bisram, Peter Ratcliffe	14 November 2015
The dealers compete for an iconic boxing belt, a Salvador Dalí statue, a blow-up chair, a First World War menu signed by royalty and a screen-worn Star Trek uniform.
71	25	"Episode 25"	Alex Proud, Celia Sawyer, David Sonnenthal, Gordon Watson	19 November 2015
A bizarre but beautiful glass embryo sculpture, a vintage arcade game, an antique Scottish knife, First World War propaganda posters and some theatrical hat couture are all up for grabs.
72	26	"Episode 26"	Jeff Salmon, Wendy Meakin, Raj Bisram, Peter Ratcliffe	20 November 2015
The dealers bid for a signed Sir Arthur Conan Doyle book, a 'spider' cabinet, a luxury Cartier pen, a rare collection of motor racing badges, and a death mask of Oliver Cromwell.
73	27	"Episode 27"	Alex Proud, Celia Sawyer, David Sonnenthal, Gordon Watson	21 November 2015
A seductive Regency painting, a mummified cat, a Rolls-Royce turbine table, an avant-garde fashion collection and an iconic Wembley seat signed by a football legend are all up for grabs.
74	28	"Episode 28"	Jeff Salmon, Wendy Meakin, Raj Bisram, Peter Ratcliffe	26 November 2015
Michael Jackson's handwritten lyrics, a historic signed football programme, a coat made of the world's most expensive natural fibre and a legendary racing driver's cockpit are up for grabs.
75	29	"Episode 29"	Alex Proud, Celia Sawyer, David Sonnenthal, Gordon Watson	27 November 2015
Can weatherman Michael Fish sell a hurricane-inspired painting to the dealers? Plus: a vintage Dior necklace, a submarine torpedo table, curious kinetic sculptures and a rare Bronte sisters book.
76	30	"Episode 30"	Jeff Salmon, Wendy Meakin, Raj Bisram, Peter Ratcliffe	28 November 2015
Sellers tempt the dealers with Freddie Mercury's stage-worn vest, a unique collection of Pearl Harbor photos, some human bone sculptures, a vintage petrol sign and a 1960s jukebox.

=== Series 5 (2016–19) ===
No. overall	No. in series	Title	Original release date
77	1	"Episode 1"	22 August 2016
78	2	"Episode 2"	29 August 2016
79	3	"Episode 3"	5 September 2016
80	4	"Episode 4"	12 September 2016
81	5	"Episode 5"	19 September 2016
82	6	"Episode 6"	26 September 2016
83	7	"Episode 7"	3 October 2016
84	8	"Episode 8"	10 October 2016
85	9	"Episode 9"	17 October 2016
86	10	"Episode 10"	24 October 2016
87	11	"Episode 11"	8 February 2017
88	12	"Episode 12"	15 February 2017
89	13	"Episode 13"	22 February 2017
90	14	"Episode 14"	27 December 2017
91	15	"Episode 15"	28 December 2017
92	16	"Episode 16"	29 December 2017
93	17	"Episode 17"	2 November 2019
Signed first edition Harry Potter novel and a pair of 19th century Japanese paintings
94	18	"Episode 18"	9 November 2019
95	19	"Episode 19"	16 November 2019
96	20	"Episode 20"	23 November 2019
