= Oscar's Orchestra =

1995 British animated television series

- Genre: Children's
- Created by: Jan Younghusband; Collingwood O'Hare
- Written by: Tony Collingwood; Roger Stennett; Dennis O'Flaherty; Doug Molitor; Jimmy Hibbert; Chris Trengove
- Directed by: Tony Collingwood
- Presented by: Warner Bros. Television
- Voices of: Dudley Moore (Oscar) (Series 1–2); David Holt (Oscar) (Series 3); Colin McFarlane (Thaddeus Vent/Tank); Elly Fairman (Rebecca); Michael Kilgarriff (Mr Crotchet); Murray Melvin (Lucius); David de Keyser (narrator); Rik Mayall (Young William Tell)
- Theme music composer: Jan Younghusband
- Countries of origin: United Kingdom; France; United States
- Original languages: English; French
- No. of series: 3
- No. of episodes: 39

Production
- Producer: Christopher O'Hare
- Running time: 30 minutes
- Production companies: Tony Collingwood Productions Limited; Marathon Productions

Original release
- Network: BBC1 (UK); France 3 (France); Syndicated (US)
- Release: 12 September 1995 – 25 March 1996

Oscar's Orchestra is an animated series that ran from 1995 to 1996 comprising a total of three series and 39 episodes as a BBC competitor to ITV's Budgie the Little Helicopter. The series was produced by the popular British animation studio Tony Collingwood Productions Limited in association with Warner Music Vision and Europe Images, and was originally shown on the BBC as part of their children's block CBBC. It also aired on the British children's cable networks The Children's Channel (TCC) and Nickelodeon and has broadcast in over more than 100 different countries worldwide such as ARD in Germany, France 3 in France, ABC in Australia and syndication in the United States.

According to the first episode, The show is set in the distant future, "in the year 735 squillion, 22 million, 381 thousand, 6 hundred and 4... Tuesday" in a city called New Vienna, and is about a talking piano called Oscar, who rebels against the evil dictator of the world, Thaddeus Vent, who has banned music. Oscar and his fellow musical instruments plot against Vent and his henchmen, Lucius and Tank, and his soothsayer, Goodtooth. Their mission is to overthrow Thadius, save the world and bring back music. The voice of Oscar was provided by Dudley Moore.

Other members of the orchestra included Monty the violin, Trevor the tuba, Sylvia the flute and Eric the triangle. Based on an idea by Jan Younghusband, Oscar's Orchestra was designed to inspire children with the delights of classical music and incorporates famous orchestrated works from the great composers in each episode such as George Frideric Handel, Johann Sebastian Bach, Ludwig van Beethoven, Wolfgang Amadeus Mozart and Frédéric Chopin. The programme's opening music is Mikhail Glinka's Overture to Ruslan and Lyudmila. The episode titles continue the theme, for example 'Bach to the Future'.

== Characters ==
- Oscar the Piano – Oscar the Piano is a blue talking grand piano, who is a so-called 'illegal instrument.' Thaddeus hates him because Oscar was once Vent's piano and Oscar refuses to not play music. Oscar is the leader of his orchestra and is constantly thinking of plans to avoid Thaddeus and bring music back to the world. He is best friends with Eric the triangle, and cares a lot for all his Orchestra, especially Rebecca and Monty. Oscar's favourite composer is Mozart. Oscar has a brave, strong personality, and was voiced by Dudley Moore and later by David Holt in season 3.
- Rebecca and Mr. Crotchet – Rebecca (aged 10) and her grandfather, Mr. Crotchet, are good humans in this story, and they hide Oscar and his Orchestra in their house. They are constantly having to think of new ideas to avoid Thaddeus Vent. They used to run a diner before Oscar and his orchestra came into their lives. Rebecca is very good with technology, and some of her creations include the Bam gun and a robotic bull. Rebecca has a crush on Tobias Vent, who is Thaddeus' nephew. Mr. Crotchet has a curiosity workshop located in their house, where he fixes broken things. Inside their house is an entrance to the metrodome, a series of underground tunnels and rooms.
- Thaddeus Vent – Thaddeus Vent is an evil dictator and Oscar's arch-enemy. He has banned music, and is helped by his hapless henchmen, Goodtooth, Lucius and Tank. Vent is a small, middle-aged man, who wears a Georgian-style wig and has a heart-shaped mole on his cheek. He also talks to his teddy bear, who is called 'Teddy.' Vent's evil schemes are always foiled by Oscar, and his orchestra. It is revealed in the first episode that his hatred for music and Oscar stemmed from when he was six years old and was too impatient to practice playing Chopin music on Oscar. When it came for him to do a recital for the audience, he threatened Oscar to play for him and fool them, but it all went wrong when Oscar accidentally revealed he could play by himself and Thadius suffered great humiliation.
- Lucius – Lucius is the deputy of Thaddeus Vent. He is a small man with green skin, greasy hair and a moustache. Lucius always thinks of new ideas, and patrols the streets of New Vienna to find illegal instruments. It is highly likely Lucius only helps out Thaddeus in his schemes because he hopes to be his heir to the throne. His pet is Tank, a savage. He is ruthless and shrewd, but seems to care for Tank on some level. Lucius' catchphrase is 'How exhilarating!'
- Tank – Tank is a savage. He is Lucius' pet, and has pink skin. Tank always helps Lucius with his schemes, but often ruins them because of his non-existent intelligence. Tank sleeps in Lucius' bedroom in Vent's palace, chained to the end of Lucius' bed. Tank will at least try to eat nearly anything, including wood, cement, and even metal. It is revealed in My Kingdom for a Tank that if Tank were more intelligent, he would prefer to be called Clifford.
- Goodtooth – Goodtooth is Thadius Vent's soothsayer. He sometimes introduces himself as 'It is I! Goodtooth, the soothsayer! Bringer of portents and potions!' He will typically introduce himself using that format. Usually whenever Goodtooth arrives, he frightens Vent after saying, 'It is I!,' who screams. Then, Goodtooth replies to Vent by saying 'Goodtooth, the soothsayer' Goodtooth is named that because of the fact he only has one, rotten tooth. Goodtooth is a coward, as he's scared of fighting, being near fighting, or seeing fighting. He prefers to use his inventions to help Thaddeus and fire from a distance.

Other characters in Oscar's Orchestra are the instruments that are part of Oscar's orchestra, who include Monty the Violin, Eric the Triangle, who is Oscar's best friend and a very avid talker (actually a Bermuda Triangle capable of creating a portal through space and time by touching his two ends together), Trevor the Tuba, Sylvia the Flute, who has a crush on Oscar, Louis the Oboe, who joined the Orchestra from France, and Jan and Stan the Cymbals.

Other instrument characters not in the orchestra include Ken the Keyboard (created by Tim Wall the winner of a Blue Peter competition, to design a new character), Hannah the Harp, Monty's American brother Murray the Violin, Viiola the Viola, Mañana the Guitar, a Spanish friend of Monty's who likes his siestas, the Spanish castanets, Captain Den the Pirate Drum and his two instrument pirate mates, who run a pirate radio station, Scheherazade the Violin from New Arabia, Chordelia the piano, a pink/purple grand piano who Oscar is implied to have a crush on, Chordelia's grandfather Claude, and Sammy the piano, a turquoise small grand piano who is younger than Oscar and Chordelia.

Other human characters include the townspeople of Old Vienna, who are on Oscar and his Orchestra's side, Thaddeus's nephew Tobias Vent, who seems to reciprocate Rebecca's feelings for him and joined the Orchestra's side during the episode Star Crossed, Thaddeus's Spanish Vice Dictator, Big Sam the boss of Chicago, Ali Babwa and his forty thieves, Rheena, who's an opera singer, Thadius's old piano teacher Kevin, who was one of the only people to treat Oscar as a friend when he was Vent's piano, Thaddeus's mother Thadweena, who is the former ruler of the world, and William Tell and his father William Tell.

Other characters in the show include Reg the bumblebee, Plutons (aliens from Pluto), an alien from Jupiter, Martians (aliens from Mars), mechonomen, or robots, created and programmed by Goodtooth for the purpose of destroying Oscar's Orchestra, giant tunnel rats and the Rat King, who allied with Thadius Vent in exchange for smelly cheese and live in the underground tunnels underneath Old Vienna, the Mountain King who lives in the mountain underneath Thadius Vent's castle, and the inhabitants of Count Jugula's castle.

Johann Sebastian Bach, Ludwig van Beethoven, and Wolfgang Amadeus Mozart have all appeared in the show as humans in the past, when Oscar and his Orchestra go back in time via Eric.

== Voice talent cast ==
- Oscar the Piano – Dudley Moore (series 1–2), David Holt (series 3)
- Thadius Vent, Tank – Colin McFarlane
- Rebecca – Elly Fairman
- Mr. Crotchet – Michael Kilgarriff
- Trevor the Tuba, Louis the Oboe – Stefan Lander
- Monty the Violin – John Baddeley
- Sylvia the Flute – Eve Karpf
- Eric the Triangle – Eric Meyers
- Goodtooth – Sean Barrett
- Lucius – Murray Melvin
- Kevin – Richard E. Grant
- Young William Tell – Rik Mayall
- Narrator – David de Keyser

== Episodes ==
=== Series 1 ===
- The Battle Begins
- Bach to the Future
- Flight of the Bumblebee
- Star Tours
- Battle on Ice
- The Four Seasons
- Oscar Cracks a Nut
- 1812
- Star Crossed
- My Kingdom for a Tank
- Viva España!
- Once Upon a Ragtime
- The Ring

=== Series 2 ===
- The Queen of Sheba
- Radio Oscar
- Dance of the Forty Thieves
- Back to Bach
- Carnival of the Animals
- Hall of the Mountain King
- Black Keys
- Sleeping Beauty
- A Fight at the Opera
- A Tale of Two Tales
- Fangs But No Fangs
- World Tour
- Four of our Notes are Missing

=== Series 3 ===
- The Lost Chords
- Out of Tune
- Knight in Shining Armor
- Musical Exercise
- Raiders of the Lost Park
- Soothsayer's Convention
- Water Music
- Return of Scheherazade
- Maestro Thadius
- An Inside Job
- Lieder of the Pack
- Greensleeves
- The Toy Symphony

== DVD releases ==
- Oscar's Orchestra Vol. 1 (2-disc set) : Episodes 1 to 13 (292 min)
- Oscar's Orchestra Vol. 2 (2-disc set) : Episodes 14 to 26 (299 min)
