= SandFest (music festival) =

Boutique beach festival in Bournemouth, England

- Genre: Music festival
- Frequency: Annually
- Locations: Sandbanks, Poole, Dorset, England.
- Years active: 9 years
- Inaugurated: 9 July 2017
- Founders: Ty Temel
- Most recent: 10 July 2022
- Next event: 9 July 2023
- Capacity: 5,000
- Organiser: TML Events
- Website: www.sandfest.co.uk

SandFest is an independent one-day music festival held annually on the south coast of England at Sandbanks Beach, Dorset. It was first held in 2017 and has remained at its current site since. SandFest classes itself as a boutique beach festival and features mainly house music, drum and bass, rap and grime artists. It has a capacity of 5000 people.

The festival is run by TML Events Company Director Ty Temel, who is also the owner of Halo Nightclub and multiple other local businesses to Bournemouth and Poole. A number of prominent music acts have performed at SandFest including Chase & Status, Rudimental, Idris Elba, Tinie Tempah, Faithless and Example.

== Location ==
The festival takes place on Sandbanks Beach. In 2005 Sandbanks was reported to have the fourth highest land value by area in the world. The Sandbanks and Canford Cliffs Coastline area has been dubbed "Britain's Palm Beach".

== Charitable activities ==
SandFest supports mental health charity Dorset Mind, a charity which aims to educate & raise awareness about mental health, challenge stigma & encourage recovery towards positive mental health & wellbeing across Dorset.

== See also ==
- List of electronic music festivals
- List of music festivals in the United Kingdom
