= Rise and Fall (TV series) =

British reality television series

- Genre: Reality; Game show
- Presented by: Greg James
- Voices of: Emma Clarke as The Lift
- Theme music composer: Patrizio Knight
- Composer: Patrizio Knight
- Country of origin: United Kingdom
- Original language: English
- No. of series: 1
- No. of episodes: 18

Production
- Camera setup: Multi-camera
- Running time: 60 minutes
- Production company: Studio Lambert

Original release
- Network: Channel 4
- Release: 19 March – 13 April 2023

Rise and Fall is a British reality television series broadcast on Channel 4, which premiered on 19 March 2023 and was hosted by Greg James.

Sixteen contestants divided themselves into the "Rulers" and the "Grafters". While the Rulers lived in a luxury penthouse making the decisions, the Grafters lived in the basement, carrying out tasks to win money for the prize pot. In each episode, the Rulers voted on one of their number to be eliminated from the game and one (or more) of the Grafters had a chance to move up to the penthouse to join them. The winner was chosen from the Rulers at the end of the series to win the prize pot of up to £100,000.

The first episode was broadcast at 9pm on Sunday 19 March 2023; subsequently episodes were broadcast at 10pm on weekday evenings before being available for streaming on All 4.

== Format ==
Sixteen contestants arrive at a building in central London and, after briefly getting to know one another, have to decide amongst themselves who becomes a "Ruler" and who remains as a "Grafter". Rulers take the lift to a luxury penthouse, while the Grafters remain in the no-frills basement. The series winner will be eventually chosen from the Rulers to win the prize pot of up to £100,000.

The Rulers are responsible for making decisions about how to get the best from the Grafters, who complete tasks to make money for the prize pot. Two Rulers also face an additional challenge to pick four Grafters to do overtime, motivating their teams by each setting a production target in the overtime task.

At the end of each second episode, the Rulers have to vote on which ruler leaves the game. One or more of the Grafters then has a chance to join the Rulers and move to the penthouse. New "Grafters" regularly join the Basement as the series goes on, to make up the numbers.

== Production ==
Channel 4 ordered Rise and Fall from production company, Studio Lambert, in August 2022. An application was made in November 2022 to film the series at Southbank Tower in central London, but filming eventually took place in London's 1927 55 Broadway tower.

Presenter Greg James made a telephone call to The Traitors' presenter, Claudia Winkleman, for advice about how to approach the presentation of the series.

During the series, contestants were filmed 24 hours a day.

The soundtrack for the series was composed by Patrizio Knight, who had previously worked on Studio Lambert franchise The Circle. Voice-over artist Emma Clarke provided the voice of The Lift.

In June 2023 Channel 4 announced they were considering axing a second series, citing the cost of filming, mistakes made filming with a fast turnaround and the show's lack of success in comparison with BBC's The Traitors. This was confirmed in January 2024.

== Contestants ==
Rise and Fall contestants
Contestant	Age	Hometown	Occupation	Entered	Exited	Status							
Contestant	Age	Hometown	Occupation	Entered	Exited	Status	Eddy Fulford	27	Devon	Account manager, from an aristocratic family	Episode 1	Episode 18	Winner
Sydney Nicholson	24	West Lothian	Delivery driver and student	Episode 1	Episode 18	Runner-up							
Matt Tacey	32	Midlands	Nurse	Episode 1	Episode 18	3rd Place							
Moses Ldn	24	London	Physical trainer	Episode 5	Episode 18	4th Place							
Ramona Shabla	34	London	Chief executive of hospitality and technology businesses	Episode 1	Episode 2	5th Place							
Ramona Shabla	34	London	Chief executive of hospitality and technology businesses	Episode 9	Episode 18	5th Place							
Rossi Woods	39	Shipdham	TikTok star	Episode 2	Episode 18	6th Place							
Rachel Salvador	27	London	Social media influencer	Episode 1	Episode 18	Finished in basement							
Connor Fisher	27	Kent	Working with the elderly and disabled	Episode 1	Episode 18	Finished in basement							
Sam Larbi	30	London	Software engineer	Episode 12	Episode 18	Finished in basement							
Isaak Dalglish	24	Standish	Paralympic badminton player	Episode 5	Episode 17	Eliminated							
Sophie Corcoran	21	Essex	Student and member of the Young Conservatives. GB News commentator.	Episode 1	Episode 16	Eliminated							
Joas Neto	38	London (originally Brazil)	PR researcher	Episode 12	Episode 14	Ejected							
Jack Woods	28	Hertfordshire	Construction worker and semi-professional footballer	Episode 1	Episode 14	Eliminated							
James Allen	26	Newport (Wales)	Employment coach	Episode 1	Episode 12	Eliminated							
Jeff Salmon	69	London	Art dealer and businessman, an expert on the TV programme Four Rooms.	Episode 1	Episode 12	Eliminated							
Cheryl Roberts	40	Liverpool	Student and former support worker	Episode 1	Episode 10	Eliminated							
Joanna Henderson	50	Suffolk	Interior designer	Episode 1	Episode 9	Walked							
Marina Pownall	18	London	Aspiring actor	Episode 1	Episode 8	Eliminated							
Rishika Bhalla	26	Birmingham	Running a charity	Episode 1	Episode 6	Eliminated							
Prince Sho	39	Hertfordshire, originally from Sierra Leone	Postal worker	Episode 1	Episode 4	Eliminated							
Ali Melin	45	Essex	Restaurant owner and businessman	Episode 1	Episode 1	Walked							

Sixteen contestants initially entered the building:

Ali left in episode 1, after finding out he was to become a Grafter.

Joanna left the show in episode 9 on medical grounds, after suffering a trapped nerve in her arm.

Ramona, who had been the first Ruler to be voted out of the game in the first few days of the show, re-entered the game as a Grafter in episode 9.

In episode 13, after walking away from the show, Connor rejoined the show as a Grafter the morning after his departure.

Joas was ejected from the show in episode 14, after throwing a glass of water over Sophie during an argument.

== Episodes ==
Six episodes were broadcast in the first week Sunday 19 March to Friday 24 March. These would be followed by four shows a week, at 10pm Monday to Thursday, for a further three weeks; there will be 18 episodes in total.

The final would be broadcast on Thursday 13 April.

=== The Final ===
For the final, all the previous eliminated Rulers returned to the programme to take part with the remaining Grafters.

Six rulers were in the penthouse for the final: Ramona, Rossi, Eddy, Moses, Sydney and Matt. Rossi was the first to lose his place, following a task which involved the other contestants becoming 'bricklayers'. Each ruler chose someone to work for them, filling six boxes with coloured bricks. Rossi lost by one brick.

The remaining five rulers gradually eliminated one another from the game. Ramona was voted out next, but in a surprise twist found she had the power to vote out the next Ruler. She chose Moses, who was then given the power to choose who came third. He chose Matt. Eddy and Sydney were left as the final two. Ramona, Moses and Matt had to decide between them who deserved to be the winner. They chose Eddy, who walked away with the £85,610 prize pot.

== Voting history ==
Votes took place amongst the Rulers in every other episode, to decide which one of them would leave the game.

Episode	1/2	3/4	5/6	7/8		9/10	11/12		13/14	15/16	17/18	18			
Ruler Voted out	Ramona	Prince	Rishika	Rachel	Marina	Cheryl	Matt	Jeff, James	Jack	Sophie	Isaak	Ramona	Moses	Matt	none
Vote	3-2-1	3-3 (Note: As the new ruler, Marina decided which contestant to eliminate.)	3-2-1	Connor's; Choice	2-2-1 (Note: As the new ruler, Connor decided which contestant to eliminate.)	4-2	Rossi's; Choice	3-3	Grafter's; Choice	3-2	5-1-1	3-1-1	Ramona's; Choice	Moses'; Choice	none
Nominated Grafters	Marina, Connor	James, Jeff	Connor, Jeff	none	Jack, Jeff, Sydney	Moses, Rossi (Note: Rossi and Sydney tied for second in the rise vote. As the person with the most rise votes Moses got to decide who would go up with him. He chose Rossi.)	none	Sydney, Sophie	Eddy, Sophie, Isaak	Isaak, Ramona, Matt	none				
Eddy	In; Basement								Nominated to Rise	Rossi (Note: Eddy and Sophie, despite being new rulers, were not immune in the elimination vote.)	Isaak	Moses	No vote	No vote	Winner (Episode 18)
Sydney	In; Basement				Nominated to Rise	In; Basement		Nominated to Rise	No vote	Sophie	Isaak	Ramona	No vote	No vote	Runner-up (Episode 18)
Matt	Ramona	Prince	Rachel	No vote	Marina	Connor	Demoted (Episode 11)	In; Basement		Nominated to Rise	Isaak (Note: Matt became the last Grafter to rise by cleaning the most plates in the final work shift.)	Ramona	No vote	No vote	Third place (Episode 18)
Moses	Not in Game		In; Basement			Nominated to Rise	No vote	James	No vote	Sophie	Isaak	Ramona	No vote	Matt (Note: Following Ramona's elimination, she joined the Board and had to choose one Ruler to eliminate and join her. She chose Moses, who then chose Matt to also sit on the Board. The three Board members had to collectively decide who would win.)	Fourth place (Episode 18)
Ramona	Rachel	Eliminated (Episode 2)				Returned (Episode 9)	In; Basement			Nominated to Rise	Matt	Matt	Moses	Fifth place (Episode 18)	
Rossi	Not in Game	In; Basement				Nominated to Rise	Matt to Demote	Jeff	No vote	Sophie	Isaak	Sixth place (Episode 18)			
Isaak	Not in Game		In; Basement						Nominated to Rise	Nominated to Rise	Rossi	Eliminated (Episode 17)			
Sam	Not in Game							In; Basement				Eliminated (Episode 17)			
Connor	Nominated to Rise	In; Basement	Nominated to Rise	Rachel to Demote	~~Matt~~; Marina	Cheryl	No vote	James	Returned to Basement	In; Basement		Eliminated (Episode 17)			
Rachel	Ramona	Cheryl	Marina	Demoted (Episode 7)	In; Basement							Eliminated (Episode 17)			
Sophie	In; Basement							Nominated to Rise	Nominated to Rise	Rossi	Eliminated (Episode 16)				
Joas	Not in Game							In; Basement		Ejected (Episode 14)					
Jack	In; Basement				Nominated to Rise	Cheryl	No vote	Jeff	No vote	Eliminated (Episode 14)					
James	In; Basement	Nominated to Rise	Rishika	No vote	Marina	Cheryl	No vote	Jeff	Eliminated (Episode 12)						
Jeff	In; Basement	Nominated to Rise	Nominated to Rise	In; Basement	Nominated to Rise	Cheryl	No vote	James	Eliminated (Episode 12)						
Cheryl	Rachel	Prince	Rishika	No vote	James	Connor	Eliminated (Episode 10)								
Joanna	In; Basement					Walked (Episode 9)									
Marina	Nominated to Rise	Prince	Rishika	No vote	Matt	Eliminated (Episode 8)									
Rishika	Ramona	Cheryl	Marina	Eliminated (Episode 6)											
Prince	Cheryl	Cheryl	Eliminated (Episode 4)												
Ali	In; Basement	Walked (Episode 1)													

Key

Remained in the basement.
Nominated to go up to the penthouse.
Was asked to go down to the basement.
As the new Ruler, the contestant could not be voted for but could still vote. Received the casting vote ~~Changed vote~~
Received the chance to pick who was to fall to the basement.
Did not receive a vote due to vote being given to one person only.

== Critical reception ==
The Guardian reviewer described the series as "The Apprentice Traitors Big Brother" and gave 3 out of 5 stars, concluding that "so far there are no revealing interactions between the proles and the blinged-up bosses, nothing to compete with the psychological subtlety and strain of The Traitors’ extended bluffs. Beneath that shiny veneer of newness is an old-fashioned, backstabbing bunfight between unlikable people – entertaining, yes, but business as usual."

The reviewer from The Telegraph described Rise and Fall as "The Traitors’ garish little cousin", adding that "contestants in the The Traitors had to do mean things but it was always just a game; here, you suspect that some of them just aren’t very nice people." The Telegraph gave the show 2 out of 5 marks.

The Lancashire Post concluded that Rise and Fall was "not immediately gripping, but as time goes by the dynamic becomes more and more fascinating, and especially after this week, you can’t help hoping for a revolution".

At the end of the first week, The Observer described Rise and Fall as trying to be "a primetime TV treatise on capitalism and power". It criticised it for too many of the contestants being "hyper-camera-aware wannabes" and the tasks as "Torture TV" that would put off families from watching.

After the end of the second week, The Tab highlighted the lack of diversity amongst the Rulers, suggesting that 'unconscious bias' was having an effect. All four ethnic minority rulers had been voted out, followed by the remaining two women, leaving all six rulers as white men. The Tab concluded that "the show right now has a real problem and looks questionable".

== International versions ==
It was revealed in July 2023 that TVN Warner Bros. Discovery Group had obtained the rights to the Rise and Fall format and Constantin Entertainment Polska had begun looking for contestants for a Polish version of the show, called Na szczyt (meaning To the Top).

In September 2025 an Indian version began streaming on MX Player, hosted by Ashneer Grover. The series was renewed for season 2 in September 2026 hosted by Cricketer Virender Sehwag.
