= Picture This (British TV series) =

- Genre: Reality
- Judges: Martin Parr; Brett Rogers; Alex Proud
- Voices of: Benedict Cumberbatch
- Country of origin: United Kingdom
- Original language: English
- No. of series: 1
- No. of episodes: 3

Production
- Running time: 60 minutes (inc. adverts)
- Production company: Renegade Pictures

Original release
- Network: Channel 4
- Release: 6 January – 20 January 2008

Picture This is a cross-platform project from Channel 4, London about photography, in collaboration with independent TV producers Renegade Pictures and Flickr, the photo sharing website.

Picture This comprises a short reality television series following the progress of six up and coming photographers as they are guided by a group of established photographers and gallery owners, and a website (www.channel4.com/picturethis) which is designed to help people improve their photography in a friendly, constructive environment.

The TV show takes the form of a constructive competition judged by photographer Martin Parr of the Magnum Photos photo agency, Brett Rogers of the Photographers' Gallery and Alex Proud of Proud Galleries.

The TV series consists of three hour long episodes, first broadcast in the UK in January 2008. The project was commissioned by Jan Younghusband and Adam Gee.

The six competitors were Aron Brown, Lucinda Chua, Elizabeth Gordon, Jay Mawson, Carolyn Mendelsohn and Edward Thompson. Elisabeth Gordon eventually won. The prize for the winner was an exhibition at the Baltic Centre for Contemporary Art in Gateshead and a book publishing deal.
