= Rise and Fall (Indian TV series) =

Indian reality series

- Genre: Reality; Game show
- Presented by: Ashneer Grover (season 1); Virender Sehwag (season 2)
- Country of origin: India
- Original language: Hindi
- No. of series: 2
- No. of episodes: 84

Production
- Camera setup: Multi-camera
- Running time: 60+ minutes

Original release
- Network: Amazon MX Player (season 1-2); Sony Entertainment Television (season 1); Prime Video (season 2)
- Release: 6 September 2025 – present

Related
- Rise and Fall

Rise and Fall is an Indian reality competition series streaming on Amazon MX Player, based on the British show of the same name. It premiered on 6 September 2025 and is currently hosted by Virender Sehwag.

Contestants divide themselves into "Rulers" and "Workers". While the Rulers live in a luxurious penthouse making the decisions, the Workers live in the basement, carrying out tasks to earn money for the prize pot.

== Series overview ==
Series	Contestants	Host	Prize	Episodes	Originally released			Winner	Runner-up
Series	Contestants	Host	Prize	Episodes	First released	Last released	Network	Winner	Runner-up
1	16	Ashneer Grover	₹28,10,000	42	6 September 2025	17 October 2025	Amazon MX Player	Arjun Bijlani	Aarush Bhola
2	18	Virender Sehwag	₹35,00,000	42	26 September 2026	6 November 2026	Amazon MX Player	Shehzad Poonawalla	Priyanka Chahar Choudhary

== Season 1 ==
Rise and Fall Season 1 contestants
Contestant	Occupation	Entered	Exited	Status
Arjun Bijlani	Actor	Day 1	Day 42	Winner
Aarush Bhola	Youtuber	Day 1	Day 42	1st runner-up
Arbaaz Patel	Reality TV Personality	Day 1	Day 42	2nd runner-up
Akriti Negi	Reality TV Personality	Day 1	Day 42	3rd runner-up
Dhanashree Verma	Choreographer	Day 1	Day 42	Finalists (Top 6)
Nayandeep Rakshit	Journalist	Day 1	Day 42	Finalists (Top 6)
Manisha Rani	Actress	Day 22	Day 41	Evicted by Rulers
Sachin Bali	Rapper	Day 1	Day 41	Evicted by Rulers
Aditya Narayan	Singer	Day 1	Day 35	Evicted
Kiku Sharda	Comedian	Day 1	Day 35	Evicted by Rulers
Kubbra Sait	Actress	Day 1	Day 28	Evicted
Aahana Kumra	Actress	Day 1	Day 21	Evicted by Rulers
Anaya Bangar	Social Media Influencer	Day 1	Day 21	Evicted by Rulers
Pawan Singh	Singer & Actor	Day 1	Day 14	Walked^{2}
Sangeeta Phogat	Wrestler	Day 1	Day 8	Walked^{1}
Noorin Sha	Actress	Day 1	Day 7	Evicted by Rulers

=== Notes ===
- Sangeeta quit the show after her father-in-law passed away.
- Pawan Singh quit the show revealing that he had only joined for a brief, temporary stint.

== Season 2 ==
Rise and Fall Season 2 contestants
Contestant	Occupation	Entered	Exited	Status
Shehzad Poonawalla	Politician	Day 1	Day 35	Winner
Priyanka Chahar Choudhary	Actress	Day 1	Day 35	1st runner-up
Gautam Gulati	Actor	Day 1	Day 35	2nd runner-up
Swara Bhasker	Actress	Day 1	Day 35	3rd runner-up
Karan Patel	Actor	Day 1	Day 11	Walked^{3}
Karan Patel	Actor	Day 18	Day 35	4th runner-up
Niharika Tiwari	Reality TV Personality	Day 1	Day 35	5th runner-up
Sonam Malik	Actress	Day 14	Day 34	Finished In Basement
Jashwanth Bopanna	Reality TV Personality	Day 14	Day 32	Evicted by Rulers
Manish Kasyap	Journalist & Youtuber	Day 1	Day 32	Evicted by Rulers
Rishabh Jaiswal	Actor & Content Creator	Day 14	Day 32	Evicted by Rulers
Irina Rudakov	Reality TV Personality	Day 1	Day 28	Evicted by Rulers
Kajal Raghwani	Actress	Day 1	Day 21	Evicted by Rulers
Sara Gurpal	Actress & Singer	Day 1	Day 21	Evicted by Rulers
Kaira Anu	Reality TV Personality	Day 1	Day 17	Evicted by Rulers
Raj Grover	Content Creator	Day 1	Day 17	Evicted by Rulers
Tej Pratap Yadav	Politician & Youtuber	Day 1	Day 14	Walked^{4}
Anish Bhagat	Content Creator	Day 1	Day 7	Evicted by Rulers
Siwet Tomar	Reality TV Personality	Day 1	Day 2	Ejected

=== Notes ===
- Karan had to quit the show due to medical reasons.
- Tej Pratap Yadav quit the show. He had only joined for a brief, temporary stint.

== Reception ==
According to Variety, the series had a strong opening week and received positive response. However, The Indian Express found the show confusing.
