= Haven Hotel =

Historic hotel in Dorset

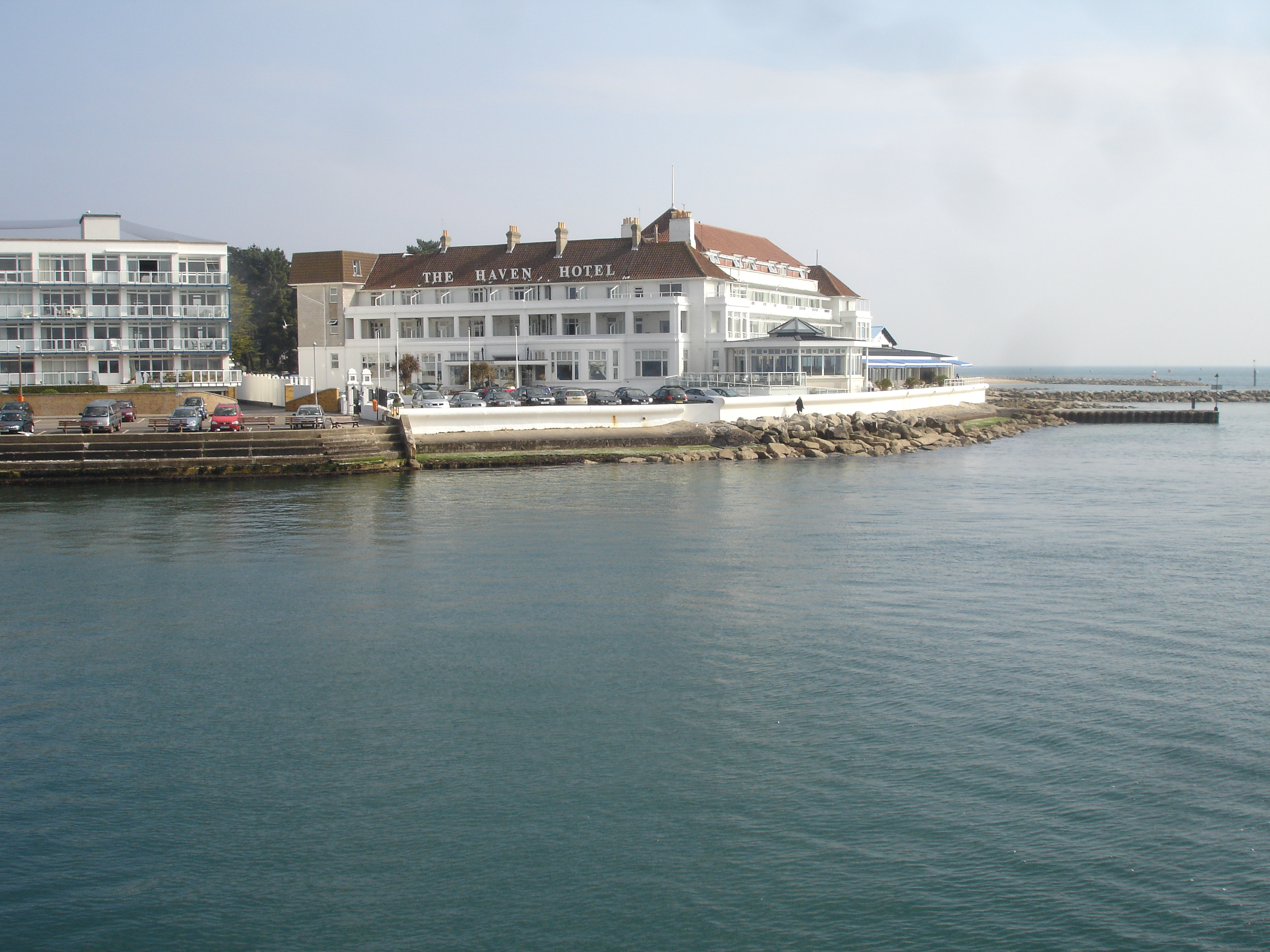
- The Haven Hotel
- Interactive map of the Haven Hotel area

General information
- Location: 161 Banks Road, Sandbanks; Dorset, England; BH13 7QL
- Coordinates: 50.683°N 1.9472°W
- Operator: FJB Hotels

Technical details
- Floor count: 3

Other information
- Number of rooms: 84
- Number of suites: 2
- Number of restaurants: 1

Website
- http://www.fjbhotels.co.uk/haven-hotel/

The Haven Hotel is a historic AA four star (formerly, no longer rated) hotel in Sandbanks, near Poole, Dorset on the south coast of England.

The hotel dates from the Victorian era and was used by wireless telegraphy pioneer Guglielmo Marconi.

== History ==
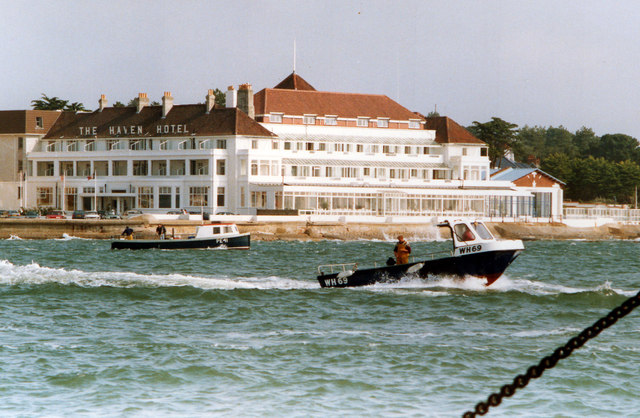
The Haven Hotel in 1989.

The North Haven Inn was originally built on the site in 1838. This building was demolished and replaced with the present Haven Hotel in 1887.

From 1898 – 1926, the Haven Hotel was home to the Italian inventor and physicist, Guglielmo Marconi, who built a 120-foot (37 m) wooden transmitter mast in the hotel’s grounds at the hotel in 1898, and another 158-foot (48 m) wireless mast at the back of the hotel. He carried out some of his first wireless telegraphy experiments at the Haven Hotel. Marconi lived at the Haven Hotel until 1926, where he took his meals at a communal table where all guests were invited to eat. Following dinner, there was often a musical interlude with Guglielmo accompanying his guests on the piano.

Other notable guests include Robert Browning, John Major, and the Real Madrid football team in 2014.

During the First World War, the Haven Hotel housed Belgian refugees. Throughout the Second World War, the Haven Hotel was a military contact point and a Naval detachment. In 1976, The Haven Hotel was purchased by the hotel chain FJB Hotels.

In 2017, a planning application was made to demolish the hotel and build a six-storey apartment block on the site, resulting in thousands of letters of objection from members of the public. It was announced in April 2021 that Bournemouth, Christchurch, and Poole Council would rule on the application in "the coming months".

== Architecture ==
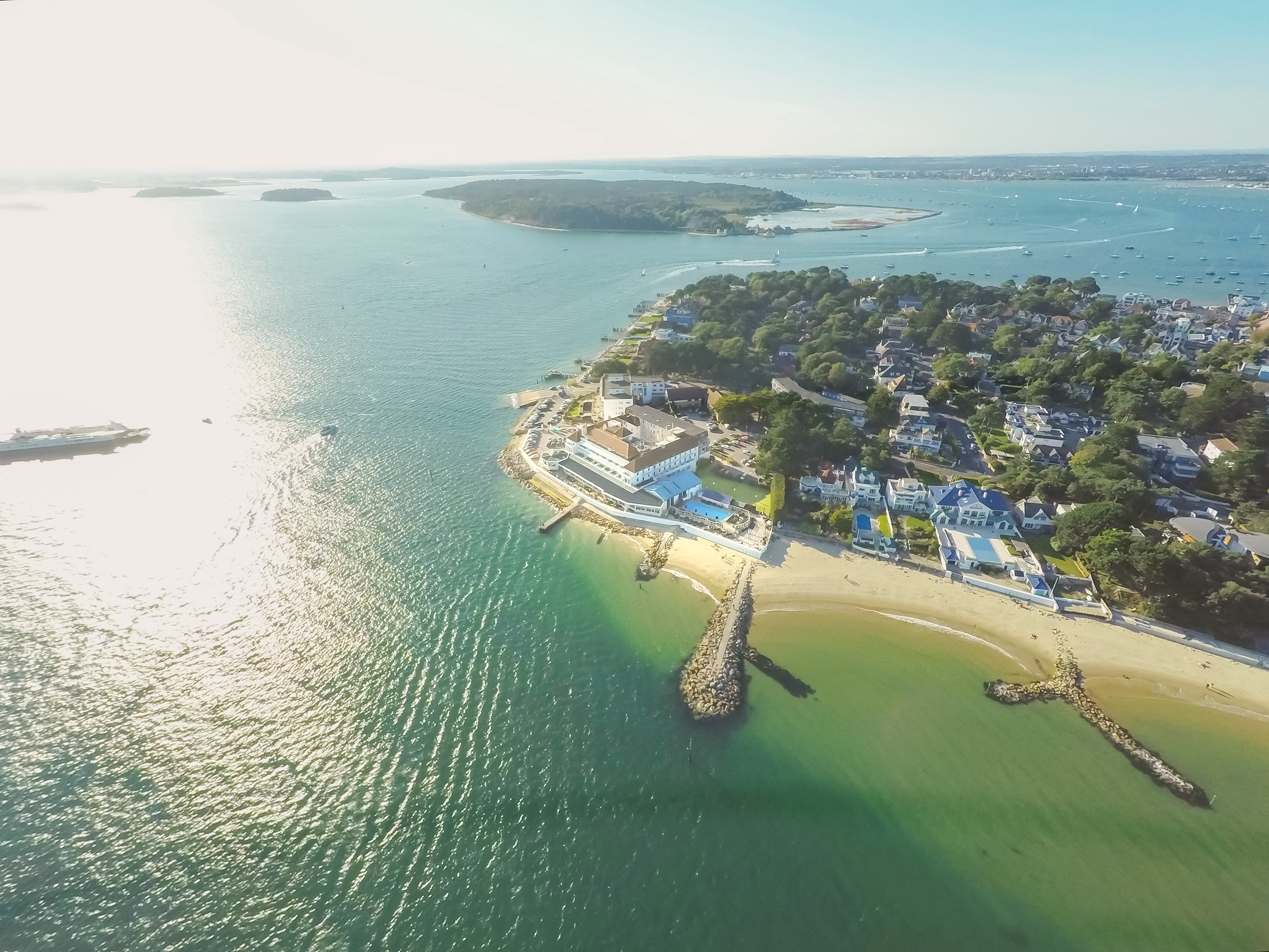
The Haven Hotel at the tip of the Sandbanks Peninsula in Poole.

The Haven Hotel was rebuilt in 1926, when the country still ricocheted from the Great War and Britain’s hotel architecture was stagnant, it was hailed a seaside architectural triumph. In fact, one publication announced it was “the only good-class hotel of any size erected of late” and a “successful attempt to combine modern ideas in hotel planning with the latest construction and materials.”

Completed in 10 months, it is said that over 1,000 architectural drawings were produced by hand and that, on average, 162 men were employed per day, for 270,600 man hours. This was an epic undertaking for what was, at the time, a seaside town. Whilst the Haven Hotel visible today has largely stayed true to its original design, there are some quirks that, over the years, have been lost to changing times and trends. For example, the seawater sunken baths, which offered guests a detoxifying soak in the comfort of their own rooms, the chauffeur’s accommodation conveniently located above the parking facilities and a petrol station for guests on the site of today’s Business Centre, and the designated smoking room, which at the time would have been considered the height of fashion.

It took 500,00 bricks, 500 tons of cement, 12,000 cubic feet of timber and 6,000 cubic feet of stonework, the hotel is now considered a fine example of 1920s architecture.
