= Your Home in Their Hands =

- Developed by: Richard Hastings; Jon Green; Emily Ryder; Rachel Arnold
- Presented by: Celia Sawyer
- Country of origin: United Kingdom
- Original language: English
- No. of series: 1
- No. of episodes: 6

Original release
- Network: BBC One
- Release: 25 September 2014 – 22 February 2015

Your Home in Their Hands is a British makeover television show that aired on BBC One from 25 September 2014 to 22 February 2015.

The show sees four amateur interior designers decorate two desperate homes in a £15,000 makeover, with Celia Sawyer as the presenter.

== Production ==
The television series was commissioned by Charlotte Moore and Mark Lindsay, and announced on 21 October 2013. Charlotte Moore said: "Your Home in Their Hands will see BBC One indulge viewers’ passion for home decoration, something we’ve not explored on the channel in recent years." Celia Sawyer, the judge for the series, said: "Anyone who comes on the show and thinks interior design is a walk in the park is going to have a real shock. Interior design isn't just about painting a wall pretty colours; it's about listening to your brief and working hard to fulfil it. That's what I will be looking for." BBC Worldwide has invested in the series.

== International broadcast ==
The series was first shown in Australia on 15 February 2015 on LifeStyle Home.
