= Four Rooms (TV series) =

- Genre: Factual
- Presented by: Anita Rani (2011–15); Sarah Beeny (2016–19)
- Narrated by: Caius Julian (2012)
- Country of origin: United Kingdom
- Original language: English
- No. of series: 5
- No. of episodes: 96 (list of episodes)

Production
- Running time: 60 minutes (inc. adverts)
- Production companies: Talkback Thames (2011); Boundless (2012–19)

Original release
- Network: Channel 4/More4
- Release: 24 May 2011 – 23 November 2019

Four Rooms is a British factual television show that aired on Channel 4/More4 from 24 May 2011 to 23 November 2019. It was originally hosted by Anita Rani from 2011 to 2015, and then by Sarah Beeny from 2016 to 2019.

== Format ==
On each episode, members of the public bring in collectible and valuable items and attempt to negotiate a sale price in a series of one-on-one meetings with four dealers. Each seller may choose the order in which they will meet the dealers, who are seated in separate rooms and are not allowed to communicate with each other. If a seller is dissatisfied with a dealer's final offer, they may move on to the next room in the chosen sequence; however, doing so voids the offer.

== Episodes ==
Series	Episodes	Originally released	
Series	Episodes	First released	Last released
1	8	24 May 2011	12 July 2011
2	8	21 March 2012	20 May 2012
3	30	29 April 2013	20 September 2013
4	30	18 May 2014	28 November 2015
5	20	22 August 2016	23 November 2019

== Dealers ==
Key:

Currently stars
Previously starred

Dealer	Series				
Dealer	1	2	3	4	5
Andrew Lamberty					
Celia Sawyer					
Alex Proud					
David Sonnenthal					
Raj Bisram					
Pearl Lowe					
Emma Hawkins					
Gordon Watson					
Jeff Salmon					
Jonny Elichaoff					
Maurice Amdur					
Shaun Clarkson					
Tamara Beckwith					
Tom Bolt					
Peter Ratcliffe					
Wendy Meakin					

== International versions ==
Three short-lived versions of Four Rooms were licensed internationally, none lasting more than one season:

- In the United States, six episodes titled Final Offer—subsequently retitled Four Rooms US when shown in the UK in 2013—aired from May 2012 to July 2012.
- A Canadian version ran on CBC-TV for eight episodes from January 2014 to March 2014.
- The German version called "Wer bietet mehr?" hosted by Kai Pflaume ran on public-legal channel Norddeutscher Rundfunk for only three episodes in 2016.
- The German version "Die Superhändler – 4 Räume, 1 Deal", started on 27 August 2018, on RTL Television and is hosted by Rag-and-bone man Sükrü Pehlivan. Over 500 episodes had aired by 2021.
- The Dutch version "Van Onschatbare Waarde", started on 2 March 2017 on NPO 1 Omroep Max and was hosted by Dionne Stax. Seven seasons so far as per October 2023.
- The Flemish version "Stukken van Mensen", started in 2016 in Belgium on the commercial channel Vier. It is hosted by Evy Gruyaert.
