= Alex Proud =

British businessman (born 1969)

Alexander Proud
- Born: 14 September 1969 (age 57); Hove
- Education: University of York
- Occupation: Entrepreneur

Alexander Proud is a British entrepreneur born in Hove, England on 14 September 1969. He was educated at Tonbridge School and then the University of York, where he studied politics. His father was the stamp dealer Ted Proud.

In 1998 he founded Proud Gallery, in London, which has since grown into the Proud Group.

== Early career ==
On leaving the University of York in 1991, Proud began an apprenticeship with a Japanese art dealer in London before opening his first gallery in 1994, selling rare Japanese prints.

== Proud Group ==
In the autumn of 1998, Proud founded the photography gallery Proud Central in London’s West End. It has since re-branded as Proud Galleries.

Since its inception, the Proud Group has expanded into a number of areas including live music events, cabaret shows and restaurants.

Proud Camden was located in the 200-year-old Grade II listed Horse Hospital in the Stables Market in Camden, London. The venue has been restored, but it retains most of its original features. It closed in 2018.

In 2018, Proud Embankment was opened under Waterloo Station.

In a 2020 investigation by The Times, five young female employees accused Proud of bullying, sexual harassment, and sexual assault. Proud denied the allegations.

== Other work ==
With photographer Rankin, Proud co-founded the photographic art book publishers Vision On, launching with Rankin’s books Nudes, Snog and CeleBritation, Audrey Hepburn by Bob Willoughby, and over 100 other titles.

Since 2013, Proud featured as a returning dealer on the Channel 4 series Four Rooms, wherein entrepreneurs and businessmen and women are pitched collectibles from members of the public. Four Rooms won Best Daytime award at 2014's Royal Television Society awards.

Proud served as a judge on Channel 4’s Picture This with photographer Martin Parr of the Magnum Photos photo agency and Brett Rogers of the Photographers' Gallery.

Proud wrote a weekly column for The Daily Telegraph from November 2015 to July 2016. He has also written for the London Evening Standard and The Sunday Times.

Proud is active in politics engaging with development proposals local to the Camden community, serving as a vice chairman for Camden Town Unlimited, and also worked as an advisor to the former Liberal Democrat leader, Charles Kennedy. On the day of the 2017 general election, Proud emailed over 500,000 voters offering them a free drink if they voted progressively. The Electoral Commission warned he could face imprisonment and fines for bribery. Proud said the offer was a joke sent out of "desperate frustration".

Proud has been invited to judge several photography competitions including the Nikon Press Awards and The Observer Hodge Awards.

In 2008 Proud co-founded the Sony World Photography Award.

== Personal life ==
As of 2013, Proud lived between East Sussex and London. He is 5”6 tall.
