= Celia Sawyer =

British businesswoman

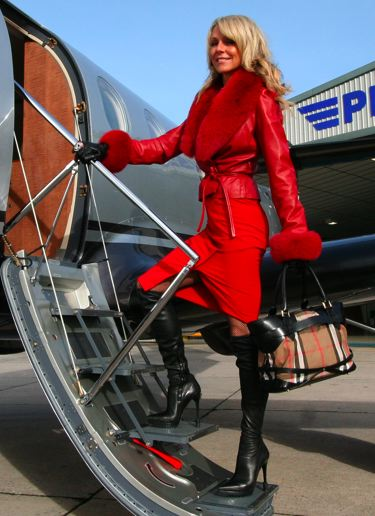
- Celia Sawyer
- Born: August 10, 1966 (age 60); London
- Occupations: Businesswoman; Interior designer Art dealer Property developer Television Personality
- Known for: Dealer on Four Rooms; Presenter of Your Home In Their Hands
- Website: Official website

Celia Valerie Sawyer (born 10 August 1966) is a British businesswoman, interior designer and dealer both through her own companies and on the Channel 4 programme Four Rooms.

== Background ==
Sawyer was born in Dulwich, South London and grew up near Bournemouth on the south coast of England. She left school aged 15, with few qualifications. An early job was as a dental nurse. She then claims that she "modelled for a few years" but was "not very successful". This led her to start a business as a photographer's agent, representing photographers and helping them find work for them on campaigns for advertising agencies, including Saatchi & Saatchi.

Sawyer turned to property investments, but is best known for her interior design work. She is now a self-made multi-millionaire.

Sawyer is married to Nick, with two children, and divides her time among London, Sandbanks on Poole Harbour, and Barbados. She is frequently in the mainstream press, alongside being a columnist for the MailOnline, Hello! and HuffPost. Sawyer's personal style has also garnered attention, with her outfits; she planned a homeware collection in 2016.

== Career ==
Sawyer is the owner of a Mayfair interior design company, Celia Sawyer Luxury Interiors. She is also a property developer, and has a portfolio that includes London and Barbados. She has also been involved in film development.

As a dealer, both on and off the big screen, Sawyer collects art and collectables, and has an extensive client base for which she sources rare objects, buying and selling for sporting personalities, celebrities and entrepreneurs.

In 2012 she became one of the four dealers in the TV programme Four Rooms. Sawyer reveals how she saw a Channel 4 advert asking viewers to send in snaps of their vintage treasures that could appear on the programme. Instead of putting forward an intriguing object, Sawyer advertised herself as a curious collectible and emailed her own photo to producers. As one of the dealers on Four Rooms, she bids and negotiates for the best possible prices for the treasures on offer.

Following on from the success of Four Rooms, Sawyer was selected by the BBC to host a new factual prime-time entertainment show for BBC One, titled Your Home in Their Hands, which debuted in September 2014. This programme sees amateur designers take over people's homes across the UK for a make-over, often with a twist. The show received in excess of 3 million viewers a week.

== Charity ==
Sawyer won the Inspiration Award for Women in 2013. She raises money for Breakthrough Breast Cancer. Sawyer is a board adviser at Football for Peace. She is also an official ambassador for the British Heart Foundation and the Prince's Trust, a patron for the Women's Refuge and a supporter of many other charities.

== Awards ==
- Inspirational Woman of the Year, 2013
- Royal Television Society award for Four Rooms, 2014
- Best Business Programme, 2014 Reality Awards
- Named in the Top 100 Most Influential British Entrepreneurs
- Named in the Top 250 Most Powerful Women Leaders
