= Jeff Salmon =

British businessman and art dealer

- Born: Jeffrey Salmon; 1953 (age 71–72); East London, United Kingdom
- Occupation(s): Businessman, art dealer
- Agent: Fishfinger Media
- Children: 4, including GFOTY
- Website: www.jeffsalmon.tv

Jeffrey "Jeff" Salmon (born 1953) is a British businessman and an art dealer both through his own companies and on the Channel 4 programme, Four Rooms. Salmon lists amongst his clients, Kate Moss, Lily Allen, Uma Thurman and U2 bassist Adam Clayton.

== Background ==
Originally from East London, Salmon worked for Sotheby's between 1970 and 1977. Aged 24, he set up his own business specialising in Art Nouveau and Art Deco. Dealing mainly in mid-20th-century design he owned two businesses based in Marylebone, London. They include Decoratum, which encompassed the two largest 20th-century furniture and design galleries in London. It was listed by The Guardian newspaper as one of the most favourite shops in west London. Salmon also runs a number of other companies in areas such as health care, air conditioning and facilities for people with disabilities as well as owning the rights to His Excellency, a Gilbert and Sullivan style opera. Salmon lives with his wife Lucia and has four children. His daughter Polly records music under the name GFOTY.

== Television ==
In 2010, Salmon was picked as one of the four dealers to appear in Four Rooms after a Channel 4 researcher visited his gallery. The programme sees the dealers attempt to buy extraordinary and unique items from members of the public. The show began airing in 2011, although Salmon left the show after the second series in 2012. He returned two years later (in 2014) for the fourth series of the show.

In March 2023 Salmon appeared as a contestant in the Channel 4 reality TV series, Rise and Fall. He left in the thirteenth episode during a surprise double elimination.
