= Sandbanks =

Neighbourhood of Poole in Dorset, England

Coordinates: 50.686°N 1.945°W

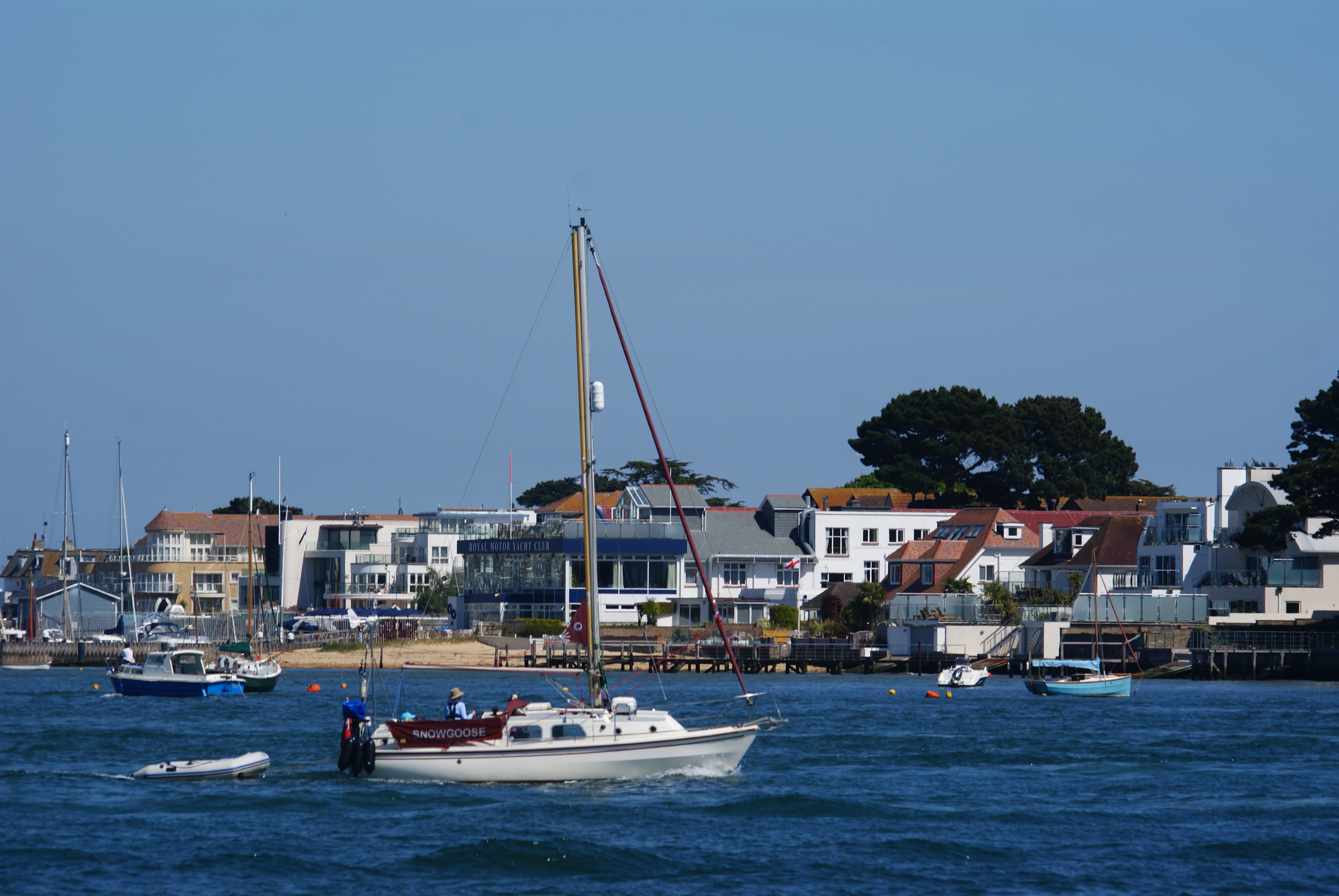
- Sandbanks viewed from Brownsea Island in Poole Harbour

- Location within Dorset
- Area: 0.39 sq mi (1.0 km^{2})
- Unitary authority: Bournemouth, Christchurch and Poole
- Ceremonial county: Dorset
- Region: South West
- Country: England
- Sovereign state: United Kingdom
- Post town: POOLE
- Postcode district: BH13
- Dialling code: 01202
- Police: Dorset
- Fire: Dorset and Wiltshire
- Ambulance: South Western
- UK Parliament: Poole

Sandbanks is an affluent neighbourhood of Poole, Dorset, on the south coast of England, situated on a narrow spit of around 1 km^{2} or 0.39 sq mi extending into the mouth of Poole Harbour.

It is known for its high property prices and for its award-winning beach. In 2005, Sandbanks was reported to have the fourth highest land value by area in the world. The Sandbanks and Canford Cliffs coastline area has been dubbed "Britain's Palm Beach".

== History ==
In its early years Sandbanks was known as "Parkstone-on-Sea". The area was largely undeveloped until the 20th century. Sandbanks Road was constructed after the First World War, linking the peninsula to the Parkstone area of Poole.

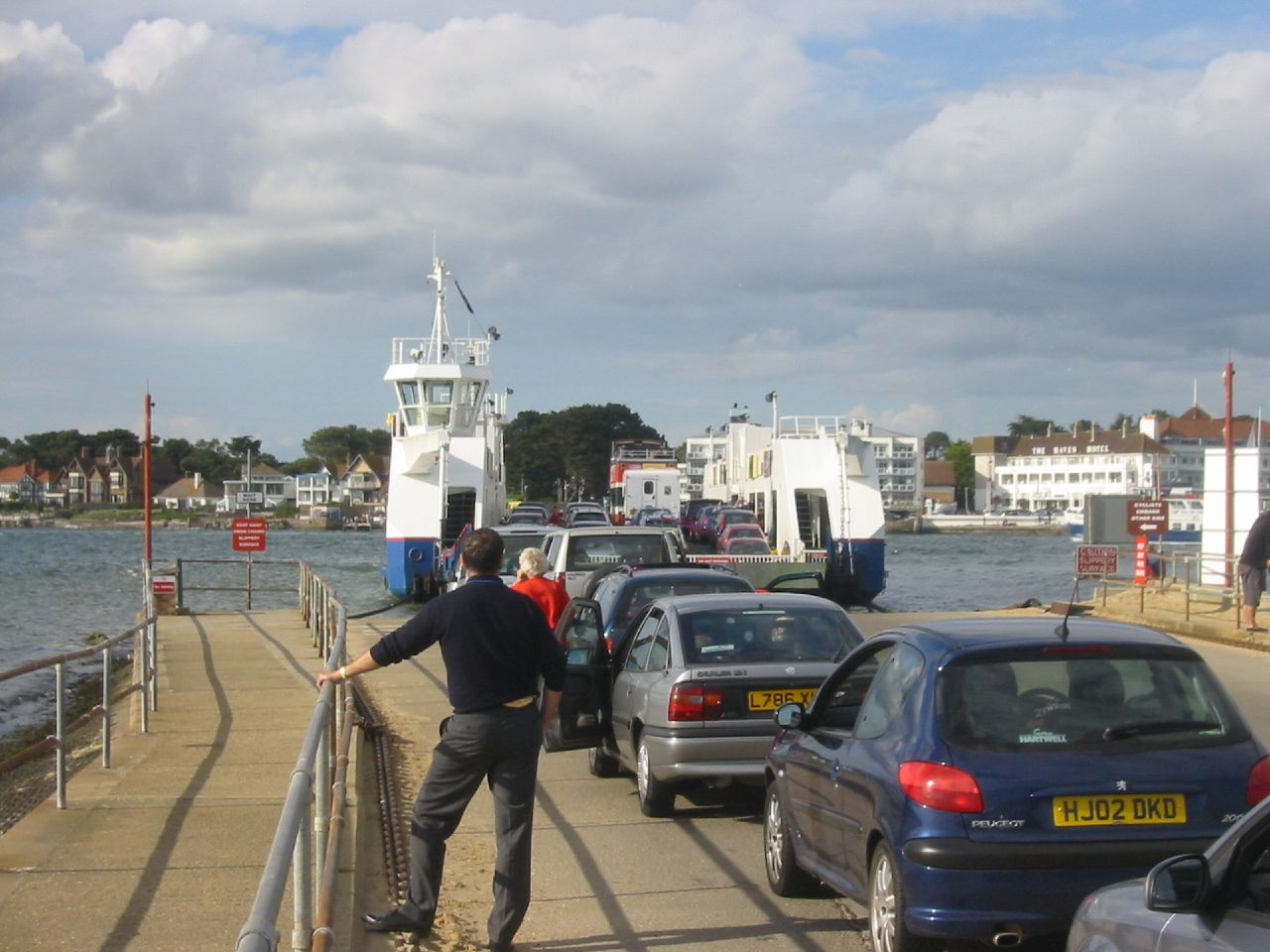
Sandbanks Ferry, looking towards Sandbanks

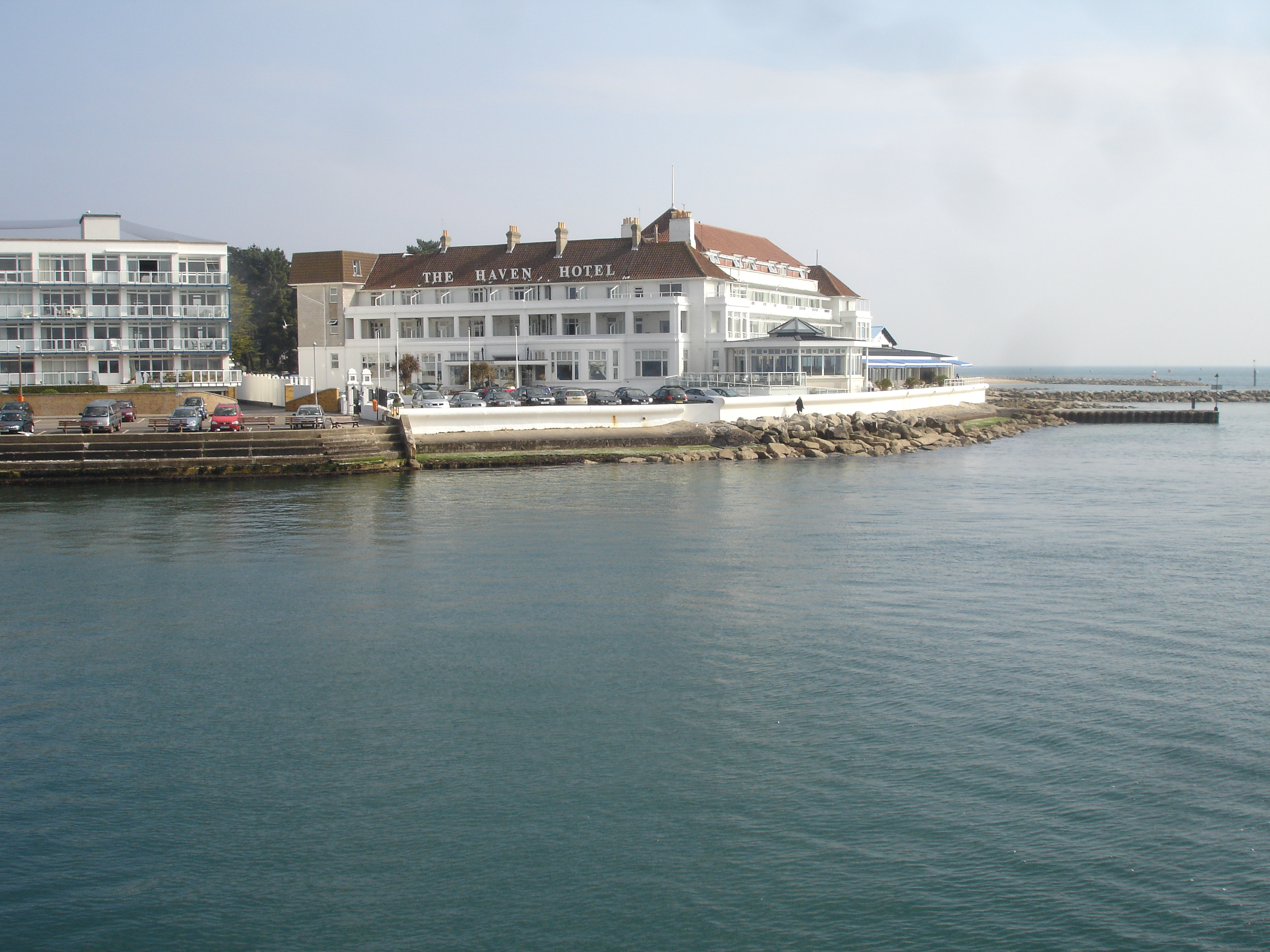
Sandbanks Peninsula, seen from the Sandbanks Ferry looking towards the Haven Hotel

== Geography ==
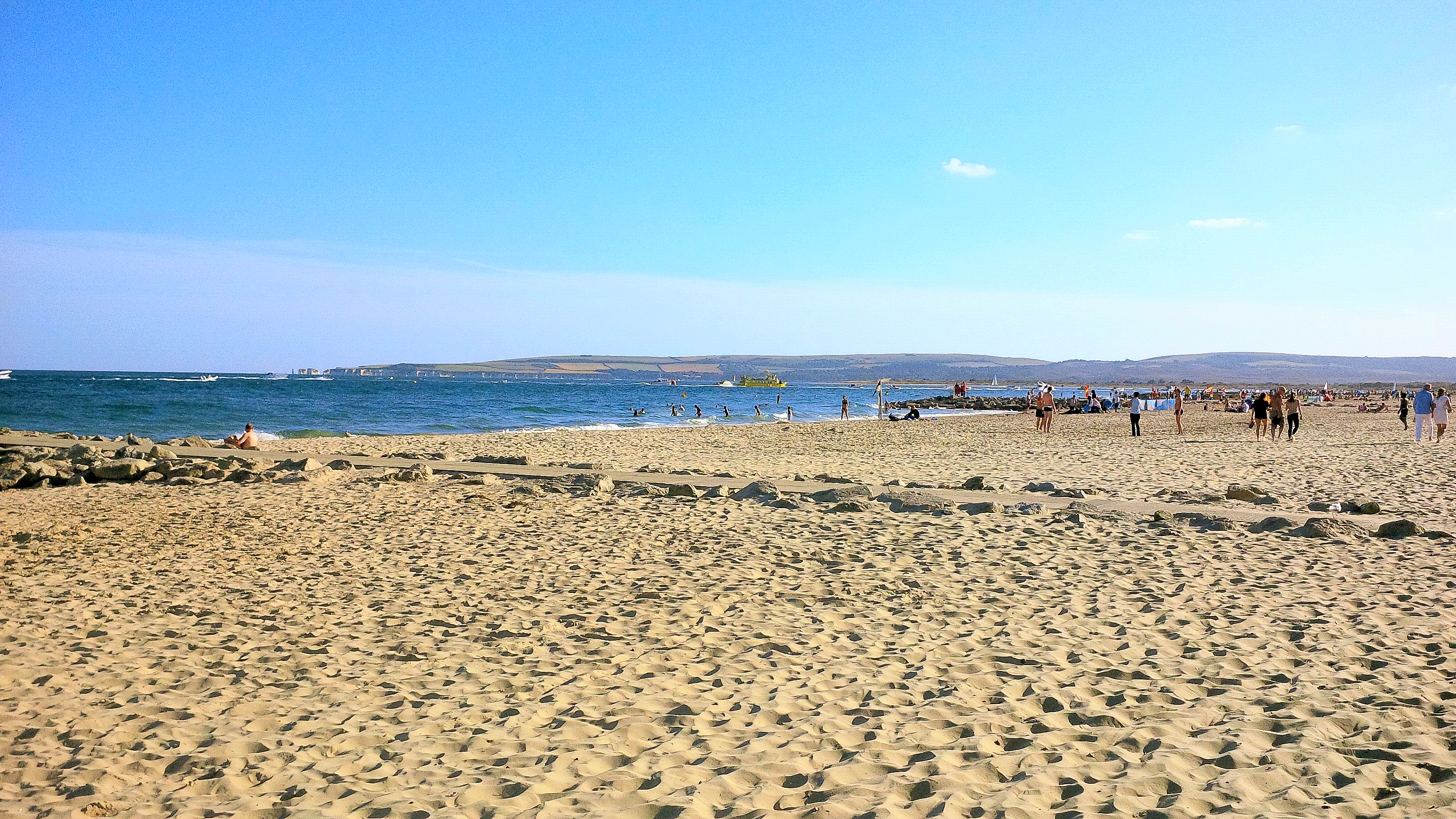
Sandbanks beach

Sandbanks is connected to Studland by the Sandbanks Ferry, a chain ferry across the mouth of the harbour. The Sandbanks area of Poole Harbour (known as North Haven Lake) is used for water sports and by light marina craft. The north side is home to the Southern Headquarters of the Royal Yachting Association and a sailing school.

Views to the north are across Poole Harbour and to Poole. To the south views extend across the English Channel and to the coastline of Studland and Swanage in the west.

== Property ==
Sandbanks is a predominantly residential area, with homes stretching east from the Harbour to The Avenue, the eastern boundary of Poole. Homes often sell for millions of pounds.

== Facilities ==
The Haven Hotel in Sandbanks, constructed in 1887, was where Guglielmo Marconi performed wireless experiments in the late 1890s while living there. Sandbanks was the third place in the world to have a permanent wireless station (1899).

The Royal National Lifeboat Institution stationed a lifeboat at Sandbanks in 1865. The crew had to travel from Poole in a horse-drawn carriage whenever it was launched, so a new Poole Lifeboat Station was opened at Fisherman's Dock on Poole Quay in 1882.

== Politics ==
Sandbanks is part of the Canford Cliffs ward which elects two councillors to Bournemouth, Christchurch and Poole Council, and also the Poole parliamentary constituency.

== Notable present or former residents ==
- Geoffrey Boycott – former test cricketer.
- Liam Gallagher – singer.
- Karl Pilkington – presenter, author and actor.
- Tony Pulis – former Stoke City football manager.
- Harry Redknapp – former football manager and player. Moved to Branksome Park in 2021.
- Celia Sawyer – television presenter.
- Mimi Smith – maternal aunt and guardian of musician John Lennon.

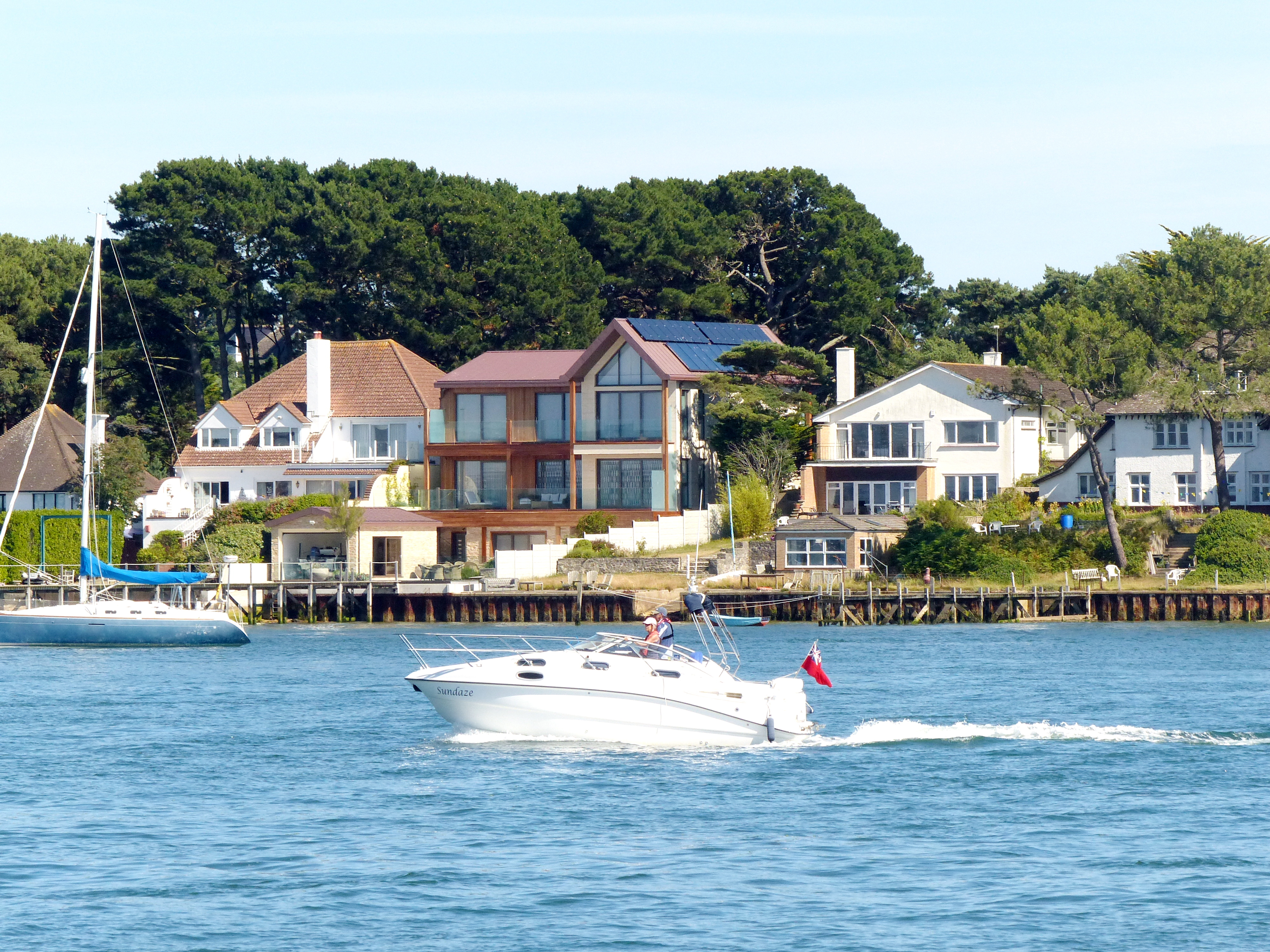
Large houses at Sandbanks, seen from the Poole to Brownsea Island ferry

== Transport ==
Sandbanks is accessible by car on two B-roads: B3369 from Parkstone and B3065 from Westbourne, or via Sandbanks Ferry from Studland. Sandbanks, along with Bournemouth and Poole, has easy access to the M27 motorway at Southampton via the A338 and A31 roads.

The nearest railway station is Parkstone, about 4 km away, but there are no public transport routes connecting there. Instead, the Purbeck Breezer bus route runs daily from Bournemouth railway station, the major station in the South East Dorset conurbation; seasonal routes (some departures only) run from Poole bus station, near to Poole railway station.
