= Jan Younghusband =

Retired British TV executive (born 1954)

- Born: May 8, 1954 (age 72)
- Education: Royal Holloway
- Occupations: Television, theatre and film producer

Jan Younghusband (born 8 May 1954) is a British producer, administrator and consultant with a career in film, theatre, television and music.

== Early life and education ==
Younghusband grew up in Portsmouth and studied music at Royal Holloway.

== Career ==
Younghusband's first job was in the office of the BBC Proms at age 17. At 20 she was working at Glyndebourne Festival Opera in production, and went on to perform similar roles at the National Theatre, as Assistant Producer and Head of Planning. Her subsequent freelance career saw her work with Sir Peter Hall, most notably on his Ring cycle at Bayreuth Festival.

In 1999, Younghusband became commissioning editor for music and performance at Channel 4, where she was responsible for initiatives such as Operatunity and Steve McQueen's BAFTA-winning debut film, Hunger. She left Channel 4 in 2009 to become head of commissioning for music television at the BBC where she was responsible for programming including Glastonbury, Later... with Jools Holland, One Love Manchester, the Royal Opera and Ballet, Adele at the BBC and Imagine... This House is Full of Music with the Kanneh-Mason family. She left the BBC in 2021.

Younghusband was named the chairperson of the British Youth Opera in July 2025.
