= Bournemouth Borough Council elections =

Local government elections in Dorset, England

Bournemouth Borough Council was the local authority for Bournemouth in Dorset, England between 1974 and 2019. Prior to 1974 Bournemouth had been a county borough within Hampshire (being a county borough meant it was self-governing, being independent of Hampshire County Council). Under the Local Government Act 1972 Bournemouth became a non-metropolitan district within Dorset on 1 April 1974, with the same boundaries as the former county borough. On 1 April 1997 it became a unitary authority, taking over the functions previously provided for the area by Dorset County Council. In 2019 the council was abolished, merging with Christchurch and Poole to form Bournemouth, Christchurch and Poole.

== Political control ==
The first elections to the reformed council were held in 1973, initially to act as a shadow authority prior to the new arrangements coming into force the following year. From 1973 until the council's abolition in 2019 political control of the council was held by the following parties:

Lower tier non-metropolitan district

Party in control	Years
Conservative	1973–1991
No overall control	1991–1997

Unitary authority

Party in control	Years
No overall control	1997–2003
Liberal Democrats	2003–2007
Conservative	2007–2019

=== Leadership ===
The role of mayor was largely ceremonial at Bournemouth Borough Council. Political leadership was instead provided by the leader of the council. The leaders from 2007 until the council's abolition in 2019 were:

Councillor	Party	From	To
Richard Smith	Liberal Democrats		2007
Stephen MacLoughlin	Conservative	May 2007	2010
Peter Charon	Conservative	19 Jul 2010	21 Feb 2012
John Beesley	Conservative	21 Feb 2012	31 Mar 2019

== Council elections ==
=== Non-metropolitan district elections ===
- 1973 Bournemouth Borough Council election
- 1976 Bournemouth Borough Council election
- 1979 Bournemouth Borough Council election (New ward boundaries)
- 1983 Bournemouth Borough Council election
- 1987 Bournemouth Borough Council election
- 1991 Bournemouth Borough Council election
- 1995 Bournemouth Borough Council election

=== Unitary authority elections ===
- 1996 Bournemouth Borough Council election
- 1999 Bournemouth Borough Council election
- 2003 Bournemouth Borough Council election (New ward boundaries)
- 2007 Bournemouth Borough Council election
- 2011 Bournemouth Borough Council election
- 2015 Bournemouth Borough Council election

== Council composition ==
The table below illustrates the seats won by the parties at each election and control of the council.

Year	Conservative	Liberal Democrats	Labour	Green	UKIP	Others	Council control after election
Local government reorganisation; interim council created (57 seats)
1973	40	2	12	0	0	3	Conservative
1976	46	2	3	0	0	6	Conservative
New ward boundaries
1979	45	2	6	0	0	4	Conservative
1983	39	5	5	0	0	8	Conservative
1987	37	13	4	0	0	3	Conservative
1991	20	28	6	0	0	3	No overall control
1995	21	26	6	0	0	4	No overall control
Council becomes a unitary authority
1996	19	28	6	0	0	4	No overall control
1999	25	20	6	0	0	6	No overall control
New ward boundaries; seats decreased from 57 to 54
2003	16	33	3	0	0	2	Liberal Democrats
2007	41	7	3	0	0	3	Conservative
2011	45	3	3	0	0	3	Conservative
2015	51	0	0	1	1	1	Conservative
Council abolished; merged into Bournemouth, Christchurch & Poole Council

== Borough result maps ==
2003 results map

2007 results map

2011 results map

2015 results map

== By-election results ==
=== 1999–2003 ===
Moordown By-Election 4 May 2000
Party	Candidate	Votes	%	±%
Conservative	Howard Henning	559	40.0	+19.3
Liberal Democrats	John Hayter	537	38.4	−1.1
Labour	Tony Hughes	301	21.5	+1.2
Majority		22	1.6	
Turnout		1,397	23.2	
Conservative gain from Liberal Democrats		Swing		

Westbourne By-Election 4 May 2000
Party	Candidate	Votes	%	±%
Conservative	John Beesley	1,565	75.5	+13.6
Liberal Democrats	Neil Russell	351	16.9	−7.1
Labour	David Stokes	156	7.5	−6.6
Majority		1,214	58.6	
Turnout		2,072	30.7	
Conservative hold		Swing		

Strouden Park By-Election 7 September 2000
Party	Candidate	Votes	%	±%
Liberal Democrats	Jean Littlewood	1,276	54.7	+11.3
Conservative	Terry Hellier-Woods	917	39.3	+1.9
Labour	Arthur O'Luby	139	6.0	−13.3
Majority		359	15.4	
Turnout		2,332	29.6	
Liberal Democrats hold		Swing		

Kinson By-Election 2 August 2001
Party	Candidate	Votes	%	±%
Labour	Janice Hurne	708	44.7	−9.8
Liberal Democrats	Donald Lazenbury	532	33.6	+13.1
Conservative	Michaela Keene	345	21.8	−3.2
Majority		176	11.1	
Turnout		1,585	25.2	
Labour hold		Swing		

=== 2003–2007 ===
Talbot & Branksome Woods By-Election 15 January 2004
Party	Candidate	Votes	%	±%
Conservative	Lynda Price	766	52.9	+1.9
Liberal Democrats	Lorna McGowan	484	33.4	+5.4
UKIP	Graham Evans	128	8.8	−2.9
Labour	David Stokes	70	4.8	−4.5
Majority		282	19.5	
Turnout		1,448	21.9	
Conservative hold		Swing		

Boscombe West By-Election 22 July 2004
Party	Candidate	Votes	%	±%
Liberal Democrats	Benedict Prescott	526	42.9	+8.1
Conservative	Christopher Wakefield	384	31.3	+5.9
Labour	David Stokes	120	9.8	−5.6
UKIP	Graham Evans	107	8.7	+8.7
Green	Roger Eede	90	7.3	+7.3
Majority		142	11.6	
Turnout		1,227	20.9	
Liberal Democrats hold		Swing		

Kinson North By-Election 29 September 2005
Party	Candidate	Votes	%	±%
Liberal Democrats	Patricia Lewis	720	37.0	−7.8
Labour	Dennis Gritt	645	33.1	+4.8
Conservative	Christopher Pomeroy	456	23.4	+7.1
UKIP	Mark Smith	126	6.5	+6.5
Majority		75	3.9	
Turnout		1,947	26.1	
Liberal Democrats hold		Swing		

Littledown & Iford By-Election 15 December 2005
Party	Candidate	Votes	%	±%
Conservative	Nicholas King	1,318	67.8	+36.9
Liberal Democrats	Alan Ketchley	389	20.0	−30.9
Labour	Debbie Sharman	162	8.3	+2.1
BNP	Barry Bennett	74	3.8	+3.8
Majority		929	47.8	
Turnout		1,943	25.9	
Conservative gain from Liberal Democrats		Swing		

=== 2007–2011 ===
Queen's Park By-Election 1 May 2008
Party	Candidate	Votes	%	±%
Conservative	Cheryl Anne Johnson	910	47.6	−7.3
Liberal Democrats	Mike Carlile	466	24.4	−10.6
UKIP	David Norman Hughes	175	9.1	+9.1
Labour Co-op	Mike Goff	149	7.8	−2.3
Independent	Chris Mayne	146	7.6	+7.6
Liberal	Bill Brandwood	67	3.5	+3.5
Majority		444	23.2	
Turnout		1,913	26.3	
Conservative hold		Swing		

Winton East By-Election 1 May 2008
Party	Candidate	Votes	%	±%
Conservative	Douglas Lloyd Barton Spencer	590	35.6	−14.9
Liberal Democrats	Anson Westbrook	411	24.8	−3.5
Labour	Mel Semple	244	14.7	+3.1
Independent	Malcolm Kenneth Lock	132	8.0	−1.7
Green	Roger Eede	126	7.6	+7.6
BNP	Barry John Sinclair Bennett	104	6.3	+6.3
UKIP	Sam Whitt	51	3.1	+3.1
Majority		179	10.8	
Turnout		1,658	24.6	
Conservative hold		Swing		

Westbourne & West Cliff By-Election 4 June 2009
Party	Candidate	Votes	%	±%
Conservative	Richard Powell	1,308	51.4	
Liberal Democrats	Noel Davenport	567	22.3	
UKIP	Rod Trelease	360	14.1	
Labour	Jack Killingback	166	6.5	
Independent	Malcolm John Chapman	146	5.7	
Majority		741	29.1	
Turnout		2,547	31.76	
Conservative hold		Swing		

=== 2011–2015 ===
Redhill and Northbourne By-Election 31 May 2012
Party	Candidate	Votes	%	±%
Conservative	David d’Orton-Gibson	675	26.7	
Labour	Jo Kennedy	539	21.3	
Liberal Democrats	Pat Lewis	424	16.8	
Independent	Claire Smith	398	15.8	
UKIP	Nicholas Atkinson	327	13.0	
Green	Sandra Hale	54	2.1	
Independent	Paul Graham	51	2.0	
BNP	Colin Smith	42	1.7	
Independent	Peter Woodley	15	0.6	
Majority		136	5.4	
Turnout		2,525	32.77	
Conservative hold		Swing		

Littledown and Iford By-Election 15 November 2012
Party	Candidate	Votes	%	±%
Conservative	Gill Seymour	810	54.0	
Labour	Debbie Lynn Sharman	247	16.5	
UKIP	David Norman Hughes	229	15.3	
Liberal Democrats	Peter David Pull	214	14.3	
Majority		563	37.5	
Turnout		1,500	19.98	
Conservative hold		Swing		

Winton East By-Election 14 November 2013
Party	Candidate	Votes	%	±%
Conservative	Pat Oakley	503	41.8	
Labour	Mike Goff	215	17.9	
UKIP	Laurence Fear	212	17.6	
Liberal Democrats	Matthew Stephen Gillett	191	15.9	
Green	Sandra Hale	48	4.0	
Independent	Kathleen Mortimer	34	2.8	
Turnout		1,203	15.44	
Conservative hold		Swing		

=== 2015–2019 ===
Kinson South By-Election 10 December 2015 (2 seats)
Party	Candidate	Votes	%	±%
Conservative	Norman Decent	520		
Conservative	Roger Marley	509		
Labour	Beryl Baxter	471		
Labour	Mel Semple	371		
UKIP	Duane Farr	313		
Bournemouth Independent Alliance	Philip Davenport	168		
Bournemouth Independent Alliance	Roger West	116		
Green	Carla Gregory-May	63		
Liberal Democrats	Gill Pardy	61		
Liberal Democrats	Phil Dunn	60		
Green	Geoffrey Darnton	54		
Patria	Kevin Dixon	8		
Conservative hold		Swing		
Conservative hold		Swing		

Kinson North By-Election 1 September 2016
Party	Candidate	Votes	%	±%
Conservative	John Perkins	556	34.7	+2.2
Labour	Dennis Gritt	517	32.2	+11.2
UKIP	Duane Farr	313	19.5	−7.5
Liberal Democrats	Stephen Plant	116	7.2	−1.8
Green	Carla Gregory-May	102	6.4	−4.0
Majority		39	2.4	
Turnout		1,604		
Conservative hold		Swing		

Throop and Muscliff By-Election 18 January 2018
Party	Candidate	Votes	%	±%
Independent	Kieron Wilson	533	31.3	+31.3
Conservative	Hazel Allen	511	30.0	+0.8
Labour	Rob Bassinder	402	23.6	+13.1
Independent	Peter Lucas	117	6.9	+6.9
Liberal Democrats	Muriel Turner	107	6.3	+6.3
Green	Jane Bull	33	1.9	−7.4
Majority		22	1.3	
Turnout		1,703		
Independent hold		Swing		
