= East Cliff and Springbourne =

Electoral ward in Dorset, England

- ward Bournemouth, Christchurch and Poole Council
- Boundary of East Cliff and Springbourne in Bournemouth, Christchurch and Poole.
- Major settlements: East Cliff; Springbourne

Current ward
- Created: 2019
- Councillor: Anne Filer (Conservative)
- Councillor: Anne-Marie Moriarty (Labour)
- Councillor: Sara Armstrong (Green)
- Created from: East Cliff and Springbourne; Queen's Park(part)

2003–2019
- Number of councillors: 3
- UK Parliament constituency: Bournemouth East

East Cliff and Springbourne is an electoral ward in Bournemouth, Dorset. Since the 2019 local election, the ward has elected 3 councillors to Bournemouth, Christchurch and Poole Council.

== History ==
The ward formerly elected 3 councillors to Bournemouth Borough Council.

Five days after the 2023 Bournemouth, Christchurch and Poole Council election, newly elected Labour councillor Martin Bedford resigned due to ill health.

== Geography ==
The ward covers the suburbs of East Cliff and Springbourne. It mainly has the same borders as under Bournemouth Borough council, but also has parts of what used to be in Queen's Park. Crime is reported to be high in the ward.

== Councillors ==
| Election | Councillors | | |
|---|---|---|---|
| 2003 | Anne Filer (Conservative) | David Kelsey (Conservative) | Michael Filer (Conservative) |
| 2007 | Anne Filer (Conservative) | David Kelsey (Conservative) | Michael Filer (Conservative) |
| 2011 | Anne Filer (Conservative) | David Kelsey (Conservative) | Michael Filer (Conservative) |
| 2015 | Anne Filer (Conservative) | David Kelsey (Conservative) | Michael Filer (Conservative) |
| BCP 2019 | Anne Filer (Conservative) | David Kelsey (Conservative) | Roberto Rocca (Conservative) |
| May 2023 | Anne Filer (Conservative) | Anne-Marie Moriarty (Labour) | Martin Bedford (Labour) |
| June 2023 | Anne Filer (Conservative) | Anne-Marie Moriarty (Labour) | Sara Armstrong (Green) |

== Election results ==
2023 by-election

East Cliff and Springbourne (1 of 3 seats)
| Party | Candidate | Votes | % | ±% |
|---|---|---|---|---|
| Green | Sara Louise Armstrong | 817 | 38.37 | |
| Conservative | David Anthony Kelsey | 614 | 28.84 | |
| Labour | Declan George Stones | 590 | 27.71 | |
| Liberal Democrats | Paul Radcliffe | 108 | 5.07 | |
| Majority | | 203 | 9.53 | |
| Turnout | | 2,129 | 18.68 | |

2023 Bournemouth, Christchurch and Poole Council election: East Cliff and Springbourne (3 seats)
| Party | Candidate | Votes | % | ±% |
|---|---|---|---|---|
| Labour | Martin Joseph Bedford | 965 | | |
| Labour | Anne-Marie Moriarty | 881 | | |
| Conservative | Anne Brenda Filer‡ | 842 | | |
| Green | Sara Louise Armstrong | 830 | | |
| Conservative | David Anthony Kelsey‡ | 797 | | |
| Conservative | Roberto Rocca‡ | 772 | | |
| Labour | Declan George Stones | 757 | | |
| Green | Paul Alexander Gray | 666 | | |
| Green | Louise Samantha Kenchington | 658 | | |
| Liberal Democrats | Ash Santini | 239 | | |
| Liberal Democrats | Frank Hollowell | 238 | | |
| Liberal Democrats | Dwaid Tyrone Edwin Coleman | 214 | | |
| Majority | | | | |
| Turnout | | | | |
| Labour gain from Conservative | | Swing | | |
| Labour gain from Conservative | | Swing | | |
| Conservative hold | | Swing | | |

2019 Bournemouth, Christchurch and Poole Council election: East Cliff and Springbourne (3 seats)
| Party | Candidate | Votes | % | ±% |
|---|---|---|---|---|
| Conservative | Anne Filer | 1,016 | 36.2 | |
| Conservative | David Kelsey | 971 | 34.6 | |
| Conservative | Roberto Rocca | 861 | 30.7 | |
| Labour | Tina Thompson | 715 | 25.5 | |
| Labour | Ian Prankerd | 691 | 24.6 | |
| Labour | David Thompson | 663 | 23.6 | |
| Green | Frank Miles | 639 | 22.8 | |
| Liberal Democrats | Alfreda Christensen-Barton | 488 | 17.4 | |
| Liberal Democrats | Jordan Blackwell | 451 | 16.1 | |
| Liberal Democrats | Brian Jenner | 447 | 15.9 | |
| Independent | Oli Cheetham | 444 | 15.8 | |
| Majority | | | | |
| Turnout | | 2,808 | 24.02% | |
| Conservative win (new seat) | | | | |
| Conservative win (new seat) | | | | |
| Conservative win (new seat) | | | | |

2011 Bournemouth Borough Council election: East Cliff & Springbourne (3 seats)
| Party | Candidate | Votes | % | ±% |
|---|---|---|---|---|
| Conservative | Anne Filer | 1,505 | | |
| Conservative | David Kelsey | 1,433 | | |
| Conservative | Michael Filer | 1,416 | | |
| Labour | Louise Bell | 762 | | |
| Labour | Carol Milner | 699 | | |
| Labour | David Thompson | 687 | | |
| Liberal Democrats | Stuart Thomas | 540 | | |
| Turnout | | | 29.86 | |
| Conservative hold | | Swing | | |
| Conservative hold | | Swing | | |
| Conservative hold | | Swing | | |
