= East Southbourne and Tuckton =

Ward in Bournemouth, Dorset, UK

- ward Bournemouth, Christchurch and Poole Council
- Boundary of East Southbourne and Tuckton in Bournemouth, Christchurch and Poole.
- Major settlements: Southbourne; Tuckton

Current ward
- Created: 2019
- Councillor: Bernadette Patricia Nanovo (Liberal Democrats)
- Councillor: Judy Richardson (Liberal Democrats)
- Created from: East Southbourne and Tuckton

2003–2019
- Number of councillors: 3
- UK Parliament constituency: Bournemouth East

East Southbourne and Tuckton is a ward in Bournemouth, Dorset. Since 2019, the ward has elected 2 councillors to Bournemouth, Christchurch and Poole Council.

== History ==
The ward formerly elected 3 councillors to Bournemouth Borough Council.

== Geography ==
The ward covers the eastern areas of Southbourne, and the suburb of Tuckton - stretching eastward to Warren Hill and Hengistbury Head.

== Councillors ==
- Basil Thorpe Ratcliffe - Conservative (1991 to 2011)

Election	Councillors		
2003	Malcolm Davies (Conservative)	Basil Thorpe Ratcliffe (Conservative)	Stephen Clarke (Conservative)
2007	Eddie Coope (Conservative)	Basil Thorpe Ratcliffe (Conservative)	Robert Lawton (Conservative)
2011	Eddie Coope (Conservative)	Malcolm Davies (Conservative)	Robert Lawton (Conservative)
2015	Eddie Coope (Conservative)	Malcolm Davies (Conservative)	Robert Lawton (Conservative)
2019	Eddie Coope (Conservative)	Malcolm Davies (Conservative)	Seat Abolished
2023	Bernadette Nanovo (Liberal Democrats)	Judy Richardson (Liberal Democrats)	Seat Abolished

== Election results ==
=== 2023 ===
East Southbourne and Tuckton
Party	Candidate	Votes	%	±%
Liberal Democrats	Bernadette Patricia Nanovo	1,660	52.6	+32.3
Liberal Democrats	Judy Richardson	1,642	52.1	+40.8
Conservative	Eddie Coope‡	984	31.2	−25.3
Conservative	Malcolm George Davies‡	865	27.4	−22.5
Green	Jane Maria Bull	334	10.6	−11.8
Labour	Alan Davidson	296	9.4	+1.1
Labour	Jan Youngs	248	7.9	−4.2
Majority				
Turnout		3,153	42.66	
Liberal Democrats gain from Conservative		Swing		
Liberal Democrats gain from Conservative		Swing		

=== 2019 ===
East Southbourne and Tuckton (2 seats)
Party	Candidate	Votes	%	±%
Conservative	Eddie Coope	1,659	56.5	
Conservative	Malcolm Davies	1,464	49.9	
Green	Jane Bull	658	22.4	
Liberal Democrats	Jon Nicholas	597	20.3	
Labour	Toni Colledge	356	12.1	
Liberal Democrats	David Ruffer	331	11.3	
Labour	Alan Davidson	245	8.3	
Majority				
Turnout		2,935	38.64%	
Conservative win (new seat)				
Conservative win (new seat)				
