= 1983 Bournemouth Borough Council election =

1983 local election in Bournemouth, England

| ← 1979 | 5 May 1983 | 1987 → |

All 57 seats to Bournemouth Borough Council 29 seats needed for a majority

| | First party | Second party | Third party |
|---|---|---|---|
| Party | Conservative | Alliance | Labour |
| Last election | 45 seats, 65.4% | 2 seats, 4.7% | 6 seats, 17.2% |
| Seats won | 39 | 5 | 5 |
| Seat change | ▼6 | ▲3 | ▼1 |
| Popular vote | 63,608 | 25,966 | 15,602 |
| Percentage | 49.7% | 20.3% | 12.2% |
| Swing | ▼15.7% | ▲15.6% | ▼5.0% |
| | Fourth party | Fifth party | Sixth party |
| Party | Independent | Ind. Conservative | Residents |
| Last election | 2 seats, 4.9% | 1 seat, 1.7% | 1 seat, 5.2% |
| Seats won | 4 | 4 | 0 |
| Seat change | ▲2 | ▲3 | ▼1 |
| Popular vote | 15,241 | 6,294 | N/A |
| Percentage | 11.9% | 4.9% | N/A |
| Swing | ▲7.0% | ▲3.2% | ▼5.6% |
Council control before election
Conservative
Council control after election
Conservative

The 1983 Bournemouth Borough Council election was held on 5 May 1983 to elect members to Bournemouth Borough Council in Dorset, England. This was on the same day as other local elections.

== Summary ==
=== Election result ===
1983 Bournemouth Borough Council election
| Party | Candidates | Seats | Gains | Losses | Net gain/loss | Seats % | Votes % | Votes | +/− |
|---|---|---|---|---|---|---|---|---|---|
| Conservative | 55 | 39 | 2 | 8 | ▼6 | 68.4 | 49.7 | 63,608 | –15.7 |
| Alliance | 35 | 5 | 3 | 0 | ▲3 | 8.8 | 20.3 | 25,966 | +15.6 |
| Labour | 23 | 5 | 0 | 1 | ▼1 | 8.8 | 12.2 | 15,602 | –5.0 |
| Independent | 15 | 4 | 2 | 0 | ▲2 | 7.0 | 11.9 | 15,241 | +7.0 |
| Ind. Conservative | 6 | 4 | 3 | 0 | ▲3 | 7.0 | 4.9 | 6,294 | +3.2 |
| Green | 5 | 0 | 0 | 0 | Steady | 0.0 | 0.9 | 1,188 | +0.5 |
| Residents | 0 | 0 | 0 | 0 | ▼1 | 0.0 | N/A | N/A | –5.6 |

== Ward results ==
=== Boscombe East ===
Boscombe East (3 seats)
| Party | Candidate | Votes | % | ±% |
|---|---|---|---|---|
| Conservative | J. Southall* | 966 | 48.3 | –13.0 |
| Conservative | R. Turner* | 965 | 48.3 | –13.3 |
| Conservative | A. Cowley* | 957 | 47.9 | –17.8 |
| Alliance | J. Denby | 701 | 35.1 | N/A |
| Alliance | M. Hurst | 683 | 34.2 | N/A |
| Alliance | J. Littlewood | 677 | 33.9 | N/A |
| Labour | C. Hourihane | 329 | 16.5 | –12.8 |
| Turnout | | 1,999 | 32.1 | –36.4 |
| Registered electors | | 6,226 | | |
| Conservative hold | | | | |
| Conservative hold | | | | |
| Conservative hold | | | | |

=== Boscombe West ===
Boscombe West (3 seats)
| Party | Candidate | Votes | % | ±% |
|---|---|---|---|---|
| Conservative | R. Wotton* | 1,054 | 53.1 | –8.6 |
| Conservative | D. Trenchard* | 1,020 | 51.4 | –16.8 |
| Conservative | G. Anstee | 926 | 46.6 | –21.8 |
| Alliance | R. Beale | 414 | 20.8 | N/A |
| Alliance | W. Parkinson | 396 | 19.9 | N/A |
| Labour | A. Dale | 267 | 13.4 | N/A |
| Green | D. Parkins | 133 | 6.7 | –11.6 |
| Independent | A. Burns-Davie | 119 | 6.0 | –7.3 |
| Turnout | | ~1,986 | 33.2 | –27.4 |
| Registered electors | | 5,982 | | |
| Conservative hold | | | | |
| Conservative hold | | | | |
| Conservative hold | | | | |

=== Central ===
Central (3 seats)
| Party | Candidate | Votes | % | ±% |
|---|---|---|---|---|
| Conservative | R. Chapman | 1,023 | 48.3 | –8.8 |
| Conservative | R. Thomason* | 956 | 45.1 | –15.1 |
| Conservative | J. Macfarlane* | 925 | 43.7 | –20.9 |
| Alliance | P. Brown | 510 | 24.1 | N/A |
| Alliance | S. Henson | 432 | 20.4 | N/A |
| Ind. Conservative | I. Macpherson | 419 | 19.8 | N/A |
| Alliance | B. Leake | 416 | 19.6 | N/A |
| Ind. Conservative | V. West | 360 | 17.0 | N/A |
| Labour | A. Shead | 167 | 7.9 | –13.5 |
| Turnout | | ~2,118 | 36.6 | –25.9 |
| Registered electors | | 5,786 | | |
| Conservative hold | | | | |
| Conservative hold | | | | |
| Conservative hold | | | | |

=== East Cliff ===
East Cliff (3 seats)
| Party | Candidate | Votes | % | ±% |
|---|---|---|---|---|
| Conservative | J. Curtis* | 1,484 | 59.3 | –8.4 |
| Conservative | H. Bostock | 1,177 | 46.9 | –14.2 |
| Conservative | P. Kellaway* | 1,084 | 43.2 | –15.7 |
| Labour | D. Stokes | 566 | 22.6 | –5.9 |
| Independent | M. Hemmi | 458 | 18.3 | N/A |
| Turnout | | ~2,508 | 39.2 | –21.9 |
| Registered electors | | 6,399 | | |
| Conservative hold | | | | |
| Conservative hold | | | | |
| Conservative hold | | | | |

=== Ensbury Park ===
Ensbury Park (3 seats)
| Party | Candidate | Votes | % | ±% |
|---|---|---|---|---|
| Conservative | J. Bryant* | 1,380 | 55.0 | –0.9 |
| Conservative | P. Real | 1,357 | 54.1 | +3.0 |
| Conservative | S. Jeffreys | 1,235 | 49.2 | +0.2 |
| Alliance | P. Craven | 784 | 31.3 | N/A |
| Alliance | V. Heasman | 757 | 30.2 | N/A |
| Labour | K. Brewer | 698 | 27.8 | –12.1 |
| Labour | A. Brushett | 685 | 27.3 | –7.3 |
| Labour | R. Wills | 627 | 25.0 | –2.6 |
| Turnout | | ~2,864 | 45.5 | –30.5 |
| Registered electors | | 6,294 | | |
| Conservative hold | | | | |
| Conservative hold | | | | |
| Conservative hold | | | | |

=== Kinson ===
Kinson (3 seats)
| Party | Candidate | Votes | % | ±% |
|---|---|---|---|---|
| Labour | L. Bennett* | 1,372 | 45.8 | +0.7 |
| Labour | V. Williams* | 1,182 | 39.5 | –1.8 |
| Conservative | W. Coe | 1,157 | 38.6 | –1.4 |
| Conservative | K. Butt | 1,141 | 38.1 | –0.2 |
| Labour | C. Longhurst | 1,140 | 38.1 | –7.6 |
| Conservative | R. Horn | 1,087 | 36.3 | –1.5 |
| Alliance | S. Foote | 465 | 15.5 | –18.4 |
| Alliance | M. Pilskin | 426 | 14.2 | N/A |
| Turnout | | ~2,994 | 45.1 | +12.0 |
| Registered electors | | 6,638 | | |
| Labour hold | | | | |
| Labour hold | | | | |
| Conservative gain from Labour | | | | |

=== Littledown ===
Littledown (3 seats)
| Party | Candidate | Votes | % | ±% |
|---|---|---|---|---|
| Conservative | B. Siberry* | 1,742 | 56.2 | –7.0 |
| Conservative | E. Hollies-Smith* | 1,704 | 54.9 | –13.0 |
| Conservative | D. Jenkinson* | 1,536 | 49.5 | –17.5 |
| Alliance | J. Thomas | 608 | 19.6 | N/A |
| Alliance | R. Buyers | 581 | 18.7 | N/A |
| Labour | R. Ansell | 316 | 10.2 | –14.7 |
| Independent | J. Morgan | 232 | 7.5 | N/A |
| Green | B. Martin | 202 | 6.5 | N/A |
| Turnout | | ~3,102 | 46.9 | –29.0 |
| Registered electors | | 6,615 | | |
| Conservative hold | | | | |
| Conservative hold | | | | |
| Conservative hold | | | | |

=== Moordown ===
Moordown (3 seats)
| Party | Candidate | Votes | % | ±% |
|---|---|---|---|---|
| Alliance | A. Moores* | 984 | 38.5 | –5.9 |
| Conservative | D. Fay | 901 | 35.2 | –1.0 |
| Alliance | J. Moore | 900 | 35.2 | +1.2 |
| Conservative | R. Cole* | 885 | 34.6 | –1.4 |
| Alliance | A. Whitelegg | 875 | 34.2 | +0.8 |
| Conservative | S. Beard | 836 | 32.7 | –2.9 |
| Labour | E. Stevens | 671 | 26.2 | –6.8 |
| Labour | J. Cant | 655 | 25.6 | +1.1 |
| Labour | J. Hawkins | 611 | 23.9 | +0.9 |
| Turnout | | ~2,558 | 42.8 | –30.9 |
| Registered electors | | 5,976 | | |
| Alliance hold | | | | |
| Conservative hold | | | | |
| Alliance gain from Conservative | | | | |

=== Muscliff ===
Muscliff (3 seats)
| Party | Candidate | Votes | % | ±% |
|---|---|---|---|---|
| Independent | R. Whittaker* | 2,752 | 62.4 | –14.0 |
| Independent | L. Troke | 1,186 | 26.9 | +1.1 |
| Conservative | S. McQueen* | 1,186 | 26.9 | –17.8 |
| Independent | P. Johnson | 1,043 | 23.7 | N/A |
| Conservative | J. Chandler* | 980 | 22.2 | –1.3 |
| Alliance | A. Musgrave-Scott | 471 | 10.7 | N/A |
| Turnout | | ~4,407 | 66.2 | –12.1 |
| Registered electors | | 6,657 | | |
| Independent hold | | | | |
| Independent gain from Conservative | | | | |
| Conservative hold | | | | |

=== Queens Park ===
Queens Park (3 seats)
| Party | Candidate | Votes | % | ±% |
|---|---|---|---|---|
| Independent | C. Dyer* | 1,871 | 68.0 | +15.0 |
| Ind. Conservative | M. Hogarth | 1,835 | 66.7 | N/A |
| Independent | P. Munro-Walker | 1,405 | 51.1 | N/A |
| Conservative | J. Banks* | 858 | 31.2 | –22.4 |
| Alliance | B. Petri | 847 | 30.8 | N/A |
| Conservative | W. Moore | 731 | 26.6 | –32.0 |
| Conservative | B. Lassman | 705 | 25.6 | –23.0 |
| Turnout | | ~5,408 | 76.5 | +3.8 |
| Registered electors | | 7,069 | | |
| Independent hold | | | | |
| Ind. Conservative gain from Conservative | | | | |
| Independent gain from Conservative | | | | |

=== Redhill Park ===
Redhill Park (3 seats)
| Party | Candidate | Votes | % | ±% |
|---|---|---|---|---|
| Ind. Conservative | P. Whitelegg* | 1,591 | 76.2 | +11.0 |
| Alliance | R. Lee | 1,299 | 62.2 | N/A |
| Conservative | G. Ball* | 1,282 | 61.4 | +7.8 |
| Conservative | C. Hayward | 1,198 | 57.4 | +12.0 |
| Conservative | B. Board | 892 | 42.7 | +5.5 |
| Turnout | | ~4,173 | 70.4 | –6.6 |
| Registered electors | | 5,928 | | |
| Ind. Conservative hold | | | | |
| Alliance gain from Conservative | | | | |
| Conservative hold | | | | |

=== Southbourne ===
Southbourne (3 seats)
| Party | Candidate | Votes | % | ±% |
|---|---|---|---|---|
| Conservative | N. Day* | 1,486 | 41.1 | –21.6 |
| Conservative | K. Palmer* | 1,427 | 39.4 | –19.2 |
| Conservative | M. Filer | 1,301 | 36.0 | –26.3 |
| Independent | K. Thresher | 1,222 | 33.8 | –17.9 |
| Independent | E. Ruston | 1,175 | 32.5 | N/A |
| Independent | B. Jeffery-Machin | 917 | 25.3 | N/A |
| Alliance | J. Millward | 907 | 25.1 | N/A |
| Alliance | A. Duffy | 631 | 17.4 | N/A |
| Alliance | P. Ayrton | 581 | 16.1 | N/A |
| Turnout | | 3,618 | 53.4 | –20.7 |
| Registered electors | | 6,776 | | |
| Conservative hold | | | | |
| Conservative hold | | | | |
| Conservative hold | | | | |

=== Strouden Park ===
Strouden Park (3 seats)
| Party | Candidate | Votes | % | ±% |
|---|---|---|---|---|
| Conservative | D. Crone* | 1,368 | 35.2 | –18.1 |
| Conservative | J. Saunders | 1,053 | 27.1 | –13.6 |
| Conservative | J. Bowater | 1,050 | 27.0 | –11.8 |
| Independent | I. Smith | 1,022 | 26.3 | N/A |
| Independent | J. Rees-Taylor | 814 | 20.9 | N/A |
| Labour | A. Emerson | 689 | 17.7 | –14.2 |
| Independent | A. Stocker | 686 | 17.6 | N/A |
| Labour | S. Gee | 680 | 17.5 | N/A |
| Alliance | R. Gaster | 564 | 14.5 | N/A |
| Green | T. Dykes | 249 | 6.4 | N/A |
| Turnout | | ~3,889 | 54.1 | –20.0 |
| Registered electors | | 7,188 | | |
| Conservative hold | | | | |
| Conservative gain from Residents | | | | |
| Conservative hold | | | | |

=== Talbot Woods ===
Talbot Woods (3 seats)
| Party | Candidate | Votes | % | ±% |
|---|---|---|---|---|
| Ind. Conservative | C. Cornish | 1,059 | 33.2 | |
| Conservative | L. Cade* | 1,036 | 32.5 | |
| Ind. Conservative | M. Levitt | 1,030 | 32.3 | |
| Conservative | L. Pardy* | 947 | 29.7 | |
| Conservative | O. Ford* | 934 | 29.3 | |
| Alliance | D. Moore | 767 | 24.0 | |
| Labour | A. Dinkenor | 327 | 10.3 | |
| Turnout | | ~3,190 | 54.3 | |
| Registered electors | | 5,874 | | |
| Ind. Conservative gain from Conservative | | | | |
| Conservative hold | | | | |
| Ind. Conservative gain from Conservative | | | | |

=== Wallisdown ===
Wallisdown (3 seats)
| Party | Candidate | Votes | % | ±% |
|---|---|---|---|---|
| Labour | B. Grower* | 1,225 | 47.7 | –0.4 |
| Labour | R. Hanlon* | 1,214 | 47.3 | –4.2 |
| Labour | P. Brushett* | 1,201 | 46.8 | –11.4 |
| Conservative | R. Cook | 736 | 28.7 | –15.0 |
| Conservative | L. Rhodes | 678 | 26.4 | N/A |
| Alliance | A. Macdonald | 603 | 23.5 | N/A |
| Alliance | B. McGuiness | 565 | 22.0 | N/A |
| Alliance | S. Starr | 519 | 20.2 | N/A |
| Turnout | | ~2,567 | 38.0 | –30.3 |
| Registered electors | | 6,756 | | |
| Labour hold | | | | |
| Labour hold | | | | |
| Labour hold | | | | |

=== West Cliff ===
West Cliff (3 seats)
| Party | Candidate | Votes | % | ±% |
|---|---|---|---|---|
| Conservative | F. Beale* | 1,523 | 83.2 | |
| Conservative | W. Forman* | 1,391 | 76.0 | |
| Conservative | J. Amor* | 1,347 | 73.6 | |
| Green | M. Hooper | 308 | 16.8 | |
| Turnout | | ~1,831 | 28.2 | |
| Registered electors | | 6,493 | | |
| Conservative hold | | | | |
| Conservative hold | | | | |
| Conservative hold | | | | |

=== West Southbourne ===
West Southbourne (3 seats)
| Party | Candidate | Votes | % | ±% |
|---|---|---|---|---|
| Alliance | D. Eyre* | 1,720 | 48.6 | –10.2 |
| Conservative | R. Bray | 1,576 | 44.5 | –4.5 |
| Conservative | E. Wyndham | 1,483 | 41.9 | –4.3 |
| Conservative | B. Beckett | 1,460 | 41.3 | –4.8 |
| Alliance | F. Cosgrove | 1,357 | 38.3 | N/A |
| Alliance | D. Frearson | 1,265 | 35.7 | N/A |
| Labour | I. Evison | 242 | 6.8 | N/A |
| Turnout | | ~3,539 | 51.8 | –20.5 |
| Registered electors | | 6,833 | | |
| Alliance hold | | | | |
| Conservative hold | | | | |
| Conservative hold | | | | |

=== Westbourne ===
Westbourne (3 seats)
| Party | Candidate | Votes | % | ±% |
|---|---|---|---|---|
| Conservative | B. Bicknell* | 1,602 | 61.5 | –17.3 |
| Conservative | J. Lodge | 1,434 | 55.1 | –17.4 |
| Conservative | G. Jaffe* | 1,426 | 54.8 | –14.0 |
| Alliance | D. Leeke | 477 | 18.3 | N/A |
| Green | R. Eede | 296 | 11.4 | N/A |
| Labour | D. Bateson | 229 | 8.8 | –9.1 |
| Turnout | | ~2,603 | 41.4 | –26.0 |
| Registered electors | | 6,287 | | |
| Conservative hold | | | | |
| Conservative hold | | | | |
| Conservative hold | | | | |

=== Winton ===
Winton (3 seats)
| Party | Candidate | Votes | % | ±% |
|---|---|---|---|---|
| Alliance | A. Fudge | 1,064 | 36.2 | N/A |
| Conservative | P. Haley* | 1,030 | 35.0 | –22.9 |
| Conservative | J. Ashton | 1,017 | 34.6 | –24.2 |
| Conservative | M. Laidlaw* | 973 | 33.1 | –23.9 |
| Alliance | J. Dunn | 907 | 30.8 | N/A |
| Alliance | L. Smith | 813 | 27.6 | N/A |
| Labour | S. Laughton | 509 | 17.3 | –14.0 |
| Independent | P. Woodley | 339 | 11.5 | N/A |
| Turnout | | ~2,943 | 47.6 | –26.8 |
| Registered electors | | 6,183 | | |
| Alliance gain from Conservative | | | | |
| Conservative hold | | | | |
| Conservative hold | | | | |
