= Bournemouth Central (ward) =

Electoral ward of Bournemouth, Dorset, England

- ward Bournemouth, Christchurch and Poole Council
- Boundary of Bournemouth Central in Bournemouth, Christchurch and Poole.
- Major settlements: Lansdowne; Richmond Hill; Town Centre

Current ward
- Created: 2019
- Councillor: Jamie Paul Martin (Labour)
- Councillor: Hazel Allen (Conservative)
- Created from: Central

2003–2019
- Number of councillors: 3
- UK Parliament constituency: Bournemouth West

Bournemouth Central or Central Bournemouth is a ward in Bournemouth, Dorset. Since 2019, the ward has elected 2 councillors to Bournemouth, Christchurch and Poole Council.

== History ==
The ward was formerly used for elections to Bournemouth Borough Council, which it elected three councillors.

== Geography ==
The ward includes Bournemouth Town Centre and Richmond Hill.

== Demographics ==
Bournemouth is the most ethnically diverse wards in Bournemouth. There are significant percentages of residents working in the wholesale and retail trade and hotels and catering and financial and insurance industries.

== Councillors ==
Election	Councillors		
2011	Mike Greene (Conservative)	Bob Chapman (Conservative)	David Smith (Conservative)
2015	Mike Greene (Conservative)	Bob Chapman (Conservative)	David Smith (Conservative)
BCP	Mike Greene (Conservative)	Hazel Allen (Conservative)	Seat Abolished
2019	Mike Greene (Conservative)	Hazel Allen (Conservative)	Seat Abolished
2023	Jamie Paul Martin (Labour)	Hazel Allen (Conservative)	Seat Abolished

== Election results ==
=== 2015 ===
Bournemouth Central re-elected the 3 conservative councillors at the 2015 Bournemouth Borough Council election.

=== 2019 ===
Bournemouth Central (2 seats)
Party	Candidate	Votes	%	±%
Conservative	Mike Greene	883	41.5	
Conservative	Hazel Allen	846	39.8	
Independent	David Smith	625	29.4	
Green	Sarah Bedford	452	21.3	
Labour	Philip Murray	349	16.4	
Labour	Charlie Nixon	289	13.6	
Liberal Democrats	Craig Norman	208	9.8	
Liberal Democrats	Kevin Williams	171	8.0	
Majority				
Turnout		2,126	25.68%	
Conservative win (new seat)				
Conservative win (new seat)				

=== 2023 ===
Bournemouth Central
Party	Candidate	Votes	%	±%
Conservative	Hazel Elizabeth Allen‡	663	32.9	−6.9
Labour	Jamie Paul Martin	640	31.8	+15.4
Conservative	Ed Down	534	26.5	−15.0
Independent	David Smith	488	24.2	−5.2
Labour	Ian Paul Prankerd	450	22.3	+8.7
Green	Jon Crewe	352	17.5	−3.8
Liberal Democrats	David George England	255	12.7	+2.8
Independent	Alan Zaczek	198	9.8	N/A
Liberal Democrats	Martin Alistair Rodger	179	8.9	+0.9
Majority				
Turnout		2,014	21.99	
Conservative hold		Swing		
Labour gain from Conservative		Swing		
