= Bournemouth Central =

Bournemouth Central may refer to one of the following places in Bournemouth, England:

- Bournemouth Central (ward)
- Bournemouth Central railway station
