= 1995 Bournemouth Borough Council election =

1995 English local election

- 4 May 1995

All 57 seats to Bournemouth Borough Council 29 seats needed for a majority

	First party	Second party
Party	Liberal Democrats	Conservative
Last election	28 seats, 40.1%	20 seats, 40.2%
Seats won	26	21
Seat change	▼2	▲1
Popular vote	40,824	33,141
Percentage	38.0%	30.8%
Swing	▼2.1%	▼9.4%
	Third party	Fourth party
Party	Labour	Independent
Last election	6 seats, 13.0%	3 seats, 5.9%
Seats won	6	4
Seat change	Steady	▲1
Popular vote	23,581	9,195
Percentage	21.9%	8.6%
Swing	▲8.9%	▲2.7%
Council control before election
No overall control
Council control after election
No overall control

The 1995 Bournemouth Borough Council election was held on 4 May 1995 to elect members to Bournemouth Borough Council in Dorset, England. This was on the same day as other local elections.

The council stayed in No overall control, with the Liberal Democrats remaining the largest party.

== Summary ==
=== Election result ===
1995 Bournemouth Borough Council election
Party	Candidates	Seats	Gains	Losses	Net gain/loss	Seats %	Votes %	Votes	+/−
Liberal Democrats	48	26	0	2	▼2	45.6	38.0	40,824	–2.1
Conservative	39	21	1	0	▲1	36.8	30.8	33,141	–9.4
Labour	34	6	0	0	Steady	10.5	21.9	23,581	+8.9
Independent	13	4	1	0	▲1	7.0	8.6	9,195	+2.7
UKIP	2	0	0	0	Steady	0.0	0.6	671	N/A
Natural Law	1	0	0	0	Steady	0.0	0.1	103	N/A
