= 1991 Bournemouth Borough Council election =

1991 English local election

- 2 May 1991

All 57 seats to Bournemouth Borough Council 29 seats needed for a majority

	First party	Second party
Party	Liberal Democrats	Conservative
Last election	13 seats, 35.4%	37 seats, 49.6%
Seats won	28	20
Seat change	▲15	▼17
Popular vote	51,316	51,408
Percentage	40.1%	40.2%
Swing	▲4.7%	▼9.4%
	Third party	Fourth party
Party	Labour	Independent
Last election	4 seats, 10.0%	2 seats, 3.7%
Seats won	6	3
Seat change	▲2	▲1
Popular vote	16,693	7,592
Percentage	13.0%	5.9%
Swing	▲3.0%	▲2.2%
Council control before election
Conservative
Council control after election
No overall control

The 1991 Bournemouth Borough Council election was held on 2 May 1991 to elect members to Bournemouth Borough Council in Dorset, England. This was on the same day as other local elections.

The Conservatives lost control of the council to No overall control, with the Liberal Democrats (the successor to the Alliance) emerging as the largest party and one seat away from a majority.

== Summary ==
=== Election result ===
1991 Bournemouth Borough Council election
Party	Candidates	Seats	Gains	Losses	Net gain/loss	Seats %	Votes %	Votes	+/−
Liberal Democrats	37	28	15	0	▲15	49.1	40.1	51,316	+4.7
Conservative	50	20	0	17	▼17	35.1	40.2	51,408	–9.4
Labour	22	6	2	0	▲2	10.5	13.0	16,693	+3.0
Independent	6	3	1	0	▲1	5.3	5.9	7,592	+2.2
Liberal	1	0	0	0	Steady	0.0	0.5	626	N/A
Green	1	0	0	0	Steady	0.0	0.3	348	N/A
Ind. Conservative	0	0	0	1	▼1	0.0	N/A	N/A	–1.2
