= 1999 Bournemouth Borough Council election =

1999 UK local government election

Elections to Bournemouth Borough Council on the south coast of England were held on 6 May 1999. The whole council (a unitary authority) was up for election.

== Results summary ==
Bournemouth Election Result 1999
Party	Seats	Gains	Losses	Net gain/loss	Seats %	Votes %	Votes	+/−
Conservative	25	5	0	+5	43.9			
Liberal Democrats	20	0	5	-5	35.1			
Labour	6	0	0	0	10.5			
Independent	6	0	0	0	10.5			
