= St Mary's Church, Springbourne =

Church in Bournemouth, Dorset, England

St Mary's Church
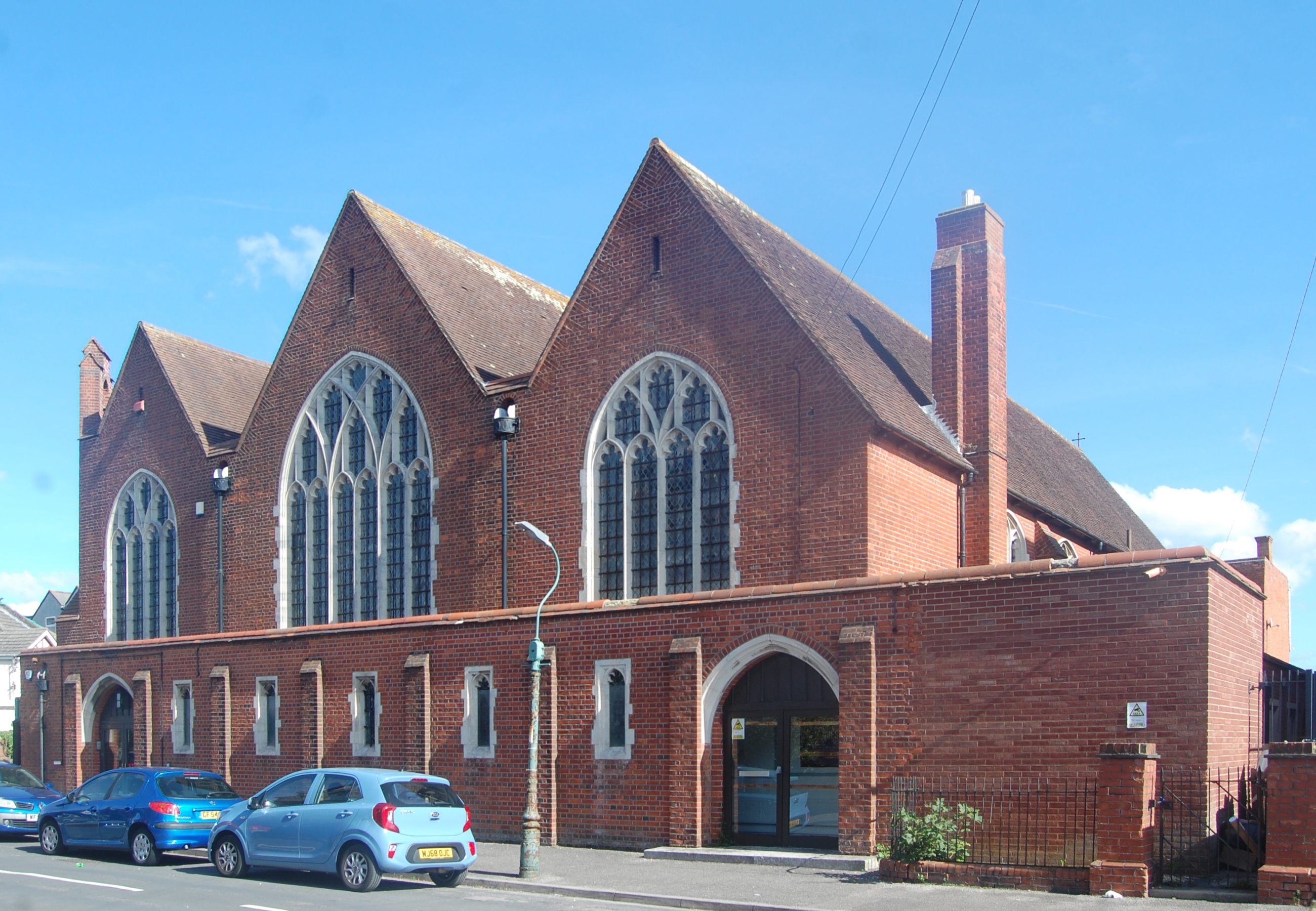
- St Mary's Church in 2022

Religion
- Affiliation: Anglicanism
- Ecclesiastical or organisational status: active

Location
- Location: St. Mary's Road, Springbourne, Bournemouth, Dorset, England
- Interactive map of St Mary's Church
- Coordinates: 50.733353°N 1.848899°W

Architecture
- Architect: Charles Nicholson
- Type: Church
- Style: English Gothic architecture
- Completed: 1926-1934

St Mary's Church is a Grade II listed church in the Springbourne area of Bournemouth, Dorset, England.

== History ==
The church was constructed from 1926 to 1934 by Sir Charles Nicholson. The building is dominated by three large windows. The church is constructed with red brick in English bond and stone window dressings. In 1997, St Mary's Church closed for regular public worship. In 1999, the building was used by the Dorset Christian Activity Centre. The church was deconsecrated around 2003. In 2006, then-Leader of the Opposition David Cameron appeared at the church during Conservative Party Conference in a renovation project led by local member of Parliament for Bournemouth East Tobias Ellwood. St Mary's returned to being used as a church in 2018. The building is now used by the Breath of Life Church.

== See also ==
- List of churches in Bournemouth
- List of Anglican churches
