= East Cliff, Bournemouth =

Coordinates: 50°43.2′N 1°51.9′W

East Cliff
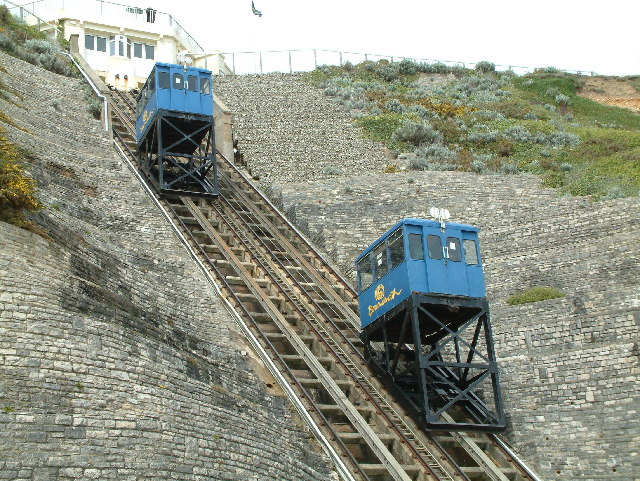
- The mechanical lift at East Cliff

- Location within Dorset
- Unitary authority: Bournemouth, Christchurch and Poole
- Ceremonial county: Dorset
- Region: South West
- Country: England
- Sovereign state: United Kingdom
- Post town: BOURNEMOUTH
- Postcode district: BH
- Police: Dorset
- Fire: Dorset and Wiltshire
- Ambulance: South Western
- UK Parliament: Bournemouth West

East Cliff is a suburb in Bournemouth, Dorset, England.

== History ==
In 2016, and again on 17 April 2021, a landslide occurred at the cliffside. A flock of goats is kept on the cliffs to control plant growth.

== Buildings ==
East Cliff is home to a number of expensive hotels, like Langtry Manor. Also in the area is the historic Russell-Cotes Art Gallery & Museum.

== Politics ==
East Cliff is part of the Bournemouth East constituency. East Cliff is also part of the East Cliff and Springbourne ward which elects three councillors to Bournemouth, Christchurch and Poole Council.

== Transport ==
Until 2019, the area was served by the East Cliff Railway.
