= 1979 Bournemouth Borough Council election =

1979 English local election

- 3 May 1979

All 57 seats to Bournemouth Borough Council 29 seats needed for a majority

	First party	Second party	Third party
Party	Conservative	Labour	Independent
Seats won	45	6	2
Popular vote	109,113	28,686	8,242
Percentage	65.4%	17.2%	4.9%
	Fourth party	Fifth party	Sixth party
Party	Liberal	Residents	Ind. Conservative
Seats won	2	1	1
Popular vote	7,863	9,255	2,906
Percentage	4.7%	5.6%	1.7%
Council control before election
Conservative
Council control after election
Conservative

The 1979 Bournemouth Borough Council election was held on 3 May 1979 to elect members to Bournemouth Borough Council in Dorset, England. This was on the same day as other local elections and the 1979 general election.

The whole council was elected on new ward boundaries. The Conservatives won a majority of seats on the council.

== Summary ==
=== Election result ===
1979 Bournemouth Borough Council election
Party	Candidates	Seats	Gains	Losses	Net gain/loss	Seats %	Votes %	Votes	+/−
Conservative	49	45	N/A	N/A		78.9	65.4	109,113	
Labour	23	6	N/A	N/A		10.5	17.2	28,686	
Independent	5	2	N/A	N/A		3.5	4.9	8,242	
Liberal	5	2	N/A	N/A		3.5	4.7	7,863	
Residents	5	1	N/A	N/A		1.8	5.6	9,255	
Ind. Conservative	1	1	N/A	N/A		1.8	1.7	2,906	
Ecology	1	0	N/A	N/A		0.0	0.4	657	

== Ward results ==
=== Boscombe East ===
Boscombe East (3 seats)
Party	Candidate	Votes	%	±%
Conservative	A. Cowley	2,745	65.7	
Conservative	W. Turner*	2,572	61.6	
Conservative	J. Southall	2,561	61.3	
Labour	C. Hourihane	1,222	29.3	
Turnout		4,176	68.5	
Registered electors		6,096		
Conservative win (new seat)				
Conservative win (new seat)				
Conservative win (new seat)				

=== Boscombe West ===
Boscombe West (3 seats)
Party	Candidate	Votes	%	±%
Conservative	J. Potter*	2,456	68.4	
Conservative	D. Trenchard	2,452	68.2	
Conservative	R. Wotton	2,216	61.7	
Ecology	I. Hatwell	657	18.3	
Independent	A. Burns-Davie	478	13.3	
Turnout		3,593	60.6	
Registered electors		5,929		
Conservative win (new seat)				
Conservative win (new seat)				
Conservative win (new seat)				

=== Central ===
Central
Party	Candidate	Votes	%	±%
Conservative	J. Macfarlane*	2,345	64.6	
Conservative	K. Thomason*	2,187	60.2	
Conservative	R. Williams*	2,075	57.1	
Residents	H. Nettleton-Walker	808	22.3	
Labour	A. Dinkenor	778	21.4	
Turnout		3,631	62.4	
Registered electors		5,819		
Conservative win (new seat)				
Conservative win (new seat)				
Conservative win (new seat)				

=== East Cliff ===
East Cliff (3 seats)
Party	Candidate	Votes	%	±%
Conservative	J. Curtis*	2,497	67.6	
Conservative	J. Adams*	2,259	61.1	
Conservative	P. Kellaway*	2,176	58.9	
Labour	J. Hawkins	1,052	28.5	
Turnout		~3,695	61.1	
Registered electors		6,048		
Conservative win (new seat)				
Conservative win (new seat)				
Conservative win (new seat)				

=== Ensbury Park ===
Ensbury Park (3 seats)
Party	Candidate	Votes	%	±%
Conservative	J. Bryant	2,273	55.9	
Conservative	B. Moorcroft	2,078	51.1	
Conservative	G. Graham*	1,993	49.0	
Residents	R. Haskell	1,702	41.9	
Labour	P. Brushett	1,623	39.9	
Labour	H. Cutler	1,408	34.6	
Labour	J. Longbottom	1,121	27.6	
Turnout		~4,790	76.0	
Registered electors		6,303		
Conservative win (new seat)				
Conservative win (new seat)				
Conservative win (new seat)				

=== Kinson ===
Kinson (3 seats)
Party	Candidate	Votes	%	±%
Labour	R. Bennett*	879	45.7	
Labour	L. Bennett*	868	45.1	
Labour	V. Williams	794	41.3	
Conservative	R. Judd	770	40.0	
Conservative	W. Coe	737	38.3	
Conservative	K. Butt	727	37.8	
Liberal	D. Cobb	651	33.9	
Independent	L. Troke	343	17.8	
Turnout		~2,210	33.1	
Registered electors		6,676		
Labour win (new seat)				
Labour win (new seat)				
Labour win (new seat)				

=== Littledown ===
Littledown (3 seats)
Party	Candidate	Votes	%	±%
Conservative	E. Hollies-Smith*	3,345	67.9	
Conservative	D. Jenkinson*	3,298	67.0	
Conservative	B. Siberry	3,113	63.2	
Labour	D. Dykes	1,226	24.9	
Turnout		~4,925	75.9	
Registered electors		6,490		
Conservative win (new seat)				
Conservative win (new seat)				
Conservative win (new seat)				

=== Moordown ===
Moordown (3 seats)
Party	Candidate	Votes	%	±%
Liberal	P. Bamborough*	1,726	44.4	
Conservative	G. Russell	1,407	36.2	
Conservative	R. Cole	1,400	36.0	
Conservative	E. Sayers	1,384	35.6	
Liberal	J. Moore	1,323	34.0	
Liberal	D. Henon	1,298	33.4	
Labour	J. Goodwin	1,286	33.0	
Labour	N. Pankhurst	955	24.5	
Labour	A. Tankard	896	23.0	
Turnout		4,318	73.7	
Registered electors		5,859		
Liberal win (new seat)				
Conservative win (new seat)				
Conservative win (new seat)				

=== Muscliff ===
Muscliff (3 seats)
Party	Candidate	Votes	%	±%
Independent	R. Whittaker*	3,567	76.4	
Conservative	S. McQueen*	2,088	44.7	
Conservative	L. Chandler*	1,609	34.5	
Independent	L. Troke	1,205	25.8	
Conservative	R. Rawsthorn	1,140	24.4	
Labour	W. Gaskin	680	14.6	
Turnout		~4,666	78.3	
Registered electors		5,959		
Independent win (new seat)				
Conservative win (new seat)				
Conservative win (new seat)				

=== Queens Park ===
Queens Park (3 seats)
Party	Candidate	Votes	%	±%
Conservative	P. Hogarth*	2,929	58.6	
Conservative	J. Banks*	2,678	53.6	
Independent	C. Dyer*	2,649	53.0	
Conservative	M. Filer	2,430	48.6	
Labour	S. Hale	1,065	21.3	
Turnout		~4,996	72.7	
Registered electors		6,872		
Conservative win (new seat)				
Conservative win (new seat)				
Independent win (new seat)				

=== Redhill Park ===
Redhill Park (3 seats)
Party	Candidate	Votes	%	±%
Ind. Conservative	P. Whitelegg*	2,906	65.2	
Conservative	G. Ball*	2,388	53.6	
Conservative	G. Masters*	2,026	45.4	
Conservative	R. Judd*	1,658	37.2	
Labour	R. Swinnerton	968	21.7	
Turnout		~4,458	77.0	
Registered electors		5,789		
Ind. Conservative win (new seat)				
Conservative win (new seat)				
Conservative win (new seat)				

=== Southbourne ===
Southbourne (3 seats)
Party	Candidate	Votes	%	±%
Conservative	E. Day*	2,696	62.7	
Conservative	B. Beckett*	2,679	62.3	
Conservative	K. Palmer*	2,516	58.6	
Residents	P. Davis	2,245	52.2	
Residents	K. Thresher	2,221	51.7	
Turnout		~4,297	74.1	
Registered electors		5,799		
Conservative win (new seat)				
Conservative win (new seat)				
Conservative win (new seat)				

=== Strouden Park ===
Strouden Park (3 seats)
Party	Candidate	Votes	%	±%
Conservative	D. Crone	2,290	53.3	
Residents	I. Page*	2,279	53.0	
Conservative	G. Anstee	1,747	40.7	
Conservative	B. Ratcliffe	1,669	38.8	
Labour	R. Wiseman	1,369	31.9	
Turnout		~4,297	74.1	
Registered electors		5,799		
Conservative win (new seat)				
Residents win (new seat)				
Conservative win (new seat)				

=== Talbot Woods ===
Talbot Woods (3 seats)
Party	Candidate	Votes	%	±%
Conservative	L. Pardy	Unopposed		
Conservative	L. Cade	Unopposed		
Conservative	O. Ford	Unopposed		
Registered electors		5,840		
Conservative win (new seat)				
Conservative win (new seat)				
Conservative win (new seat)				

=== Wallisdown ===
Wallisdown (3 seats)
Party	Candidate	Votes	%	±%
Labour	G. Spicer*	2,616	58.2	
Labour	R. Hanton*	2,314	51.5	
Labour	B. Grower*	2,160	48.1	
Conservative	L. Doe	1,962	43.7	
Turnout		~4,491	68.3	
Registered electors		6,576		
Labour win (new seat)				
Labour win (new seat)				
Labour win (new seat)				

=== West Cliff ===
West Cliff (3 seats)
Party	Candidate	Votes	%	±%
Conservative	W. Forman*	Unopposed		
Conservative	F. Beale*	Unopposed		
Conservative	J. Amor*	Unopposed		
Registered electors		6,504		
Conservative win (new seat)				
Conservative win (new seat)				
Conservative win (new seat)				

=== West Southbourne ===
West Southbourne (3 seats)
Party	Candidate	Votes	%	±%
Liberal	D. Eyre	2,865	58.8	
Conservative	A. Patton	2,388	49.0	
Conservative	L. Mansell	2,251	46.2	
Conservative	R. Ruston	2,249	46.1	
Turnout		~4,875	72.3	
Registered electors		6,743		
Liberal win (new seat)				
Conservative win (new seat)				
Conservative win (new seat)				

=== Westbourne ===
Westbourne (3 seats)
Party	Candidate	Votes	%	±%
Conservative	B. Bicknell*	3,184	78.8	
Conservative	R. Purnell*	2,929	72.5	
Conservative	G. Jaffe*	2,779	68.8	
Labour	R. Woodley	721	17.9	
Turnout		~4,039	67.4	
Registered electors		5,993		
Conservative win (new seat)				
Conservative win (new seat)				
Conservative win (new seat)				

=== Winton ===
Winton (3 seats)
Party	Candidate	Votes	%	±%
Conservative	D. Manton	2,627	58.8	
Conservative	P. Haley	2,589	57.9	
Conservative	M. Laidlaw	2,546	57.0	
Labour	C. Reidy	1,401	31.3	
Labour	A. Shead	1,284	28.7	
Turnout		~4,469	74.4	
Registered electors		6,007		
Conservative win (new seat)				
Conservative win (new seat)				
Conservative win (new seat)				
