= Springbourne =

Suburb of Bournemouth, England

Coordinates: 50.73°N 1.85°W

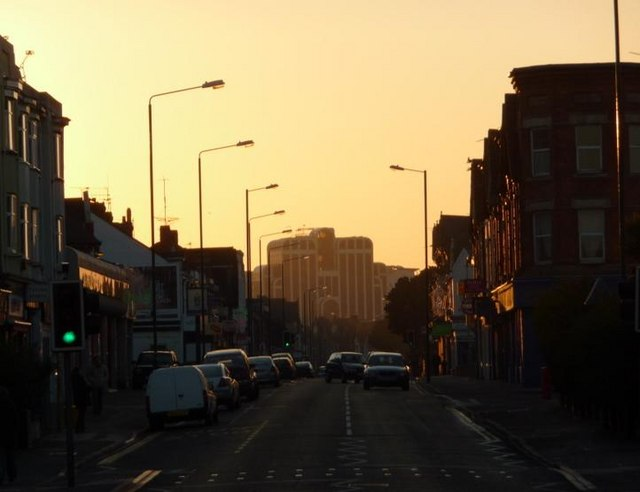
- Holdenhurst Road, Springbourne

- Location within Dorset
- OS grid reference: SZ105924
- Unitary authority: Bournemouth, Christchurch and Poole
- Ceremonial county: Dorset
- Region: South West
- Country: England
- Sovereign state: United Kingdom
- Post town: BOURNEMOUTH
- Postcode district: BH1
- Dialling code: 01202
- Police: Dorset
- Fire: Dorset and Wiltshire
- Ambulance: South Western
- UK Parliament: Bournemouth East

Springbourne is a suburb of Bournemouth in Dorset, England (historically in Hampshire). It occupies the north-east part of the main built-up area, north of Boscombe. Its formal boundaries are Northcote Road to the west, the Wessex Way (A338) to the north, Ashley Road to the east, and the railway line to the south.

Its main road, Holdenhurst Road, was formerly the A338, the main road into Bournemouth from the north and north-east. It has now been bypassed, but it is still one of the main shopping streets and bus routes of Bournemouth.

== History ==
The original suburb of Springbourne covered 93 acres (380,000 m^{2}) and at one time was known as Boscombe Heath. The area gets its name from an old spring that came from near the Windham Road end of Spring Road. The stream then wandered underground to Boscombe Chine and out to sea.

Springbourne began its life as a village providing accommodation to craftsmen and artisans employed in the growing town of Bournemouth; many of the cottages they lived in, built in the mid- to late Victorian era, can be seen today in the Northcote and Lytton Road areas. Later came avenues of mainly Edwardian houses, the roads named after US presidents and statesmen, e.g. Garfield Avenue, Washington Avenue.

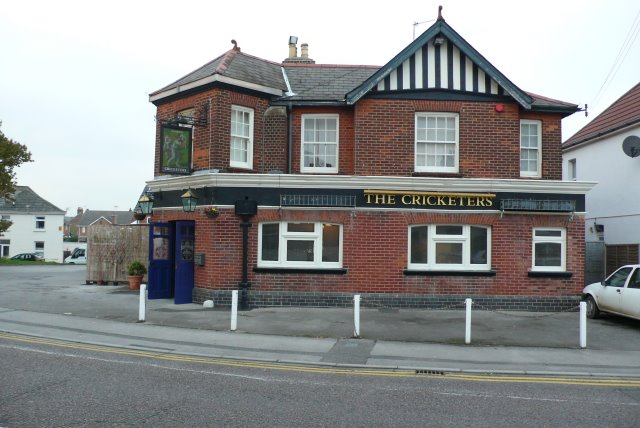
The Cricketers

The Cricketers Arms (1867) in Windham Road is one of the oldest pubs in Bournemouth. Originally known as The Cricketers Hotel, it was named after the cricket ground that once existed on land opposite, now the site of the Bournemouth Council depot adjoining the railway line and Southcote Road.

The pub's original stables and coach house are still standing and heritage experts reckon the front of the pub was extended a short distance around 1910. The stained glass windows and the bar are thought to date from the same time and, according to stories handed down by regulars, the bar was taken from a cruise ship.

Bournemouth-born boxing world champion Freddie Mills lived in nearby Spring Road and used to drink in the Cricketers.

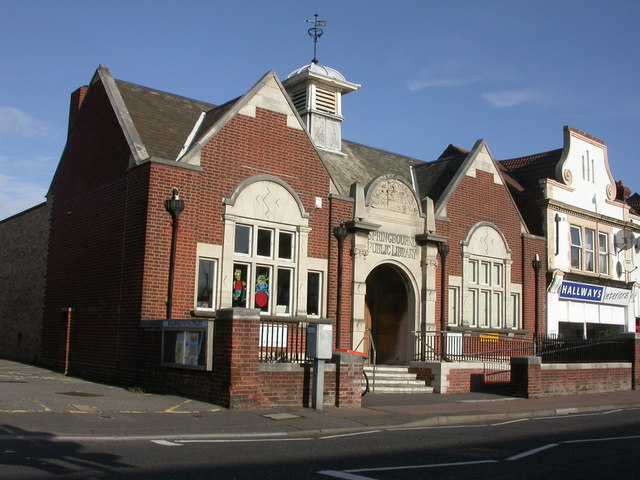
Springbourne Library

Springbourne Library opened in 1909 and was made possible by its benefactor, Andrew Carnegie, it being one of the many Carnegie libraries, a scheme created by Andrew Carnegie, that involved building 2509 libraries worldwide, 660 of which were built in the UK. Andrew Carnegie started this scheme as a Philanthropist, after retiring from business and selling his steel enterprises to Mr J. P. Morgan for $6 billion.

St Mary's Church was completed in 1934. Frederick Abberline was a Chief Inspector for the London Metropolitan Police and was a prominent police figure in the investigation into the Jack the Ripper murders of 1888. He retired to Springbourne - firstly to 4 Methuen Road (demolished, in the 1960s, to make room for Wessex Way), then to "Estcourt", 195 Holdenhurst Road, where he died in 1930. A plaque commemorating Abberline was unveiled at the latter property on 29 September 2001.

In 2011 Springbourne Gardens, a pocket park, was opened alongside Springbourne Library.

== Politics ==
Springbourne is part of the Bournemouth East constituency. Springbourne is also part of the East Cliff and Springbourne ward which elects three councillors to Bournemouth, Christchurch and Poole Council.
