= 1987 Bournemouth Borough Council election =

1987 local election in Bournemouth, England

- 7 May 1987

All 57 seats to Bournemouth Borough Council 29 seats needed for a majority

	First party	Second party	Third party
Party	Conservative	Alliance	Labour
Last election	39 seats, 49.7%	5 seats, 20.3%	5 seats, 12.2%
Seats won	37	13	4
Seat change	▼2	▲8	▼1
Popular vote	71,747	51,201	14,507
Percentage	49.6%	35.4%	10.0%
Swing	▼0.1%	▲15.1%	▼2.2%
	Fourth party	Fifth party
Party	Independent	Ind. Conservative
Last election	4 seats, 11.9%	4 seats, 4.9%
Seats won	2	1
Seat change	▼2	▼3
Popular vote	5,339	1,765
Percentage	3.7%	1.2%
Swing	▼8.2%	▼3.7%
Council control before election
Conservative
Council control after election
Conservative

The 1987 Bournemouth Borough Council election was held on 7 May 1987 to elect members to Bournemouth Borough Council in Dorset, England. This was on the same day as other local elections.

The Conservatives maintained control of the council.

== Summary ==
=== Election result ===
1987 Bournemouth Borough Council election
Party	Candidates	Seats	Gains	Losses	Net gain/loss	Seats %	Votes %	Votes	+/−
Conservative	54	37	6	8	▼2	64.9	49.6	71,747	–0.1
Alliance	46	13	8	0	▲8	22.8	35.4	51,201	+15.1
Labour	29	4	0	1	▼1	7.0	10.0	14,507	–2.2
Independent	4	2	0	2	▼2	3.5	3.7	5,339	–8.2
Ind. Conservative	1	1	0	3	▼3	1.8	1.2	1,765	–3.7
