= 2003 Bournemouth Borough Council election =

2003 UK local government election

Map of results of 2003 election

Elections to Bournemouth Borough Council on the south coast of England were held on 1 May 2003. The whole council (a unitary authority) was up for election. The number of seats at this election was reduced from 57 to 54 (wards reduced from 19 to 18).

== Election result ==
Bournemouth Election Result 2003
Party	Seats	Gains	Losses	Net gain/loss	Seats %	Votes %	Votes	+/−
Liberal Democrats	33	15	0	15	61.1	44.86	49,728	
Conservative	16	0	10	-10	29.6	37.40	41,462	
Labour	3	0	3	-3	5.5	9.51	10,538	
Independent	2	0	5	-5	3.7	6.04	6,695	
UKIP	0	0	0	0	0	1.66	1,839	
Dorset Stop the War	0	0	0	0	0	0.27	299	
BNP	0	0	0	0	0	0.26	293	
