= 2011 Bournemouth Borough Council election =

2011 UK local government election

Map of results of 2011 election

Elections to Bournemouth Borough Council were held on 5 May 2011, in line with other local elections in the United Kingdom. All 54 seats, across 18 wards of this unitary authority, were up for election.

There were 176 candidates nominated, comprised as follows: 54 Conservatives, 40 Labour, 39 Liberal Democrats, 24 Independents, 14 UK Independence Party, 4 Green Party and 1 Liberal Party. There were 3 more candidates standing than in the 2007 election.

== Composition of council seats before election ==
Party	Seats
Conservative	36
Liberal Democrats	8
Independent	5
Labour	3
Non-aligned	2

== Election result summary ==
Bournemouth Election Result 2011
Party	Seats	Gains	Losses	Net gain/loss	Seats %	Votes %	Votes	+/−
Conservative	45	9	0	+9	83.3	50.9	64,556	-1.8
Labour	3	1	1	0	5.6	17.3	21,883	+8.3
Liberal Democrats	3	0	5	-5	5.6	17.1	21,721	-9.5
Independent	3	0	2	-2	5.6	10.5	13,278	+3.8
UKIP	0	0	0	0	0	3.1	3,899	-0.5
Green	0	0	0	0	0	0.9	1,185	+0.1
Liberal	0	0	0	0	0	0.2	268	+0.2

Less than a week after the elections, Derek Borthwick, elected as an independent in the Throop and Muscliff ward joined the Conservative Party.

== Election results by ward ==
Boscombe East (3 seats)
Party	Candidate	Votes	%	±%
Conservative	Christopher Rochester	1,128		
Conservative	Linda Bailey	1,059		
Conservative	John Wilson	1,032		
Independent	Mike Everingham	683		
Liberal Democrats	Lorraine Crouch	682		
Labour	Jilly Grower	612		
Liberal Democrats	Andy Jones	586		
Liberal Democrats	Peter Blinkhorn	574		
Labour	Mike Hicks	514		
Independent	Rob Wotton	412		
Turnout			38.98	
Conservative hold		Swing		
Conservative hold		Swing		
Conservative gain from Independent		Swing		

Boscombe West (3 seats)
Party	Candidate	Votes	%	±%
Conservative	Jane Kelly	747		
Conservative	Christopher Wakefield	723		
Conservative	Philip Stanley-Watts	686		
Liberal Democrats	Lisa Northover	537		
Liberal Democrats	Maan Basma	420		
Labour	Mike Goff	350		
Liberal Democrats	Peter Pull	336		
Labour	Bob Milner	309		
Labour	Ian Taylor	279		
Green	Damian Maguire	261		
Independent	Angus Reid	187		
Independent	Michal Figat	150		
Turnout			26.49	
Conservative hold		Swing		
Conservative hold		Swing		
Conservative gain from Liberal Democrats		Swing		

Central (3 seats)
Party	Candidate	Votes	%	±%
Conservative	Bob Chapman	1,207		
Conservative	Mike Greene	1,118		
Conservative	Dave Smith	1,036		
Liberal Democrats	Tony Card	557		
Labour	Austin McCormack	516		
Labour	Stepehn Sinsbury	442		
Turnout			25.35	
Conservative hold		Swing		
Conservative hold		Swing		
Conservative hold		Swing		

East Cliff & Springbourne (3 seats)
Party	Candidate	Votes	%	±%
Conservative	Anne Filer	1,505		
Conservative	David Kelsey	1,433		
Conservative	Michael Filer	1,416		
Labour	Louise Bell	762		
Labour	Carol Milner	699		
Labour	David Thompson	687		
Liberal Democrats	Stuart Thomas	540		
Turnout			29.86	
Conservative hold		Swing		
Conservative hold		Swing		
Conservative hold		Swing		

East Southborne & Tuckton (3 seats)
Party	Candidate	Votes	%	±%
Conservative	Edward Coope	2,293		
Conservative	Malcolm Davies	2,197		
Conservative	Robert Lawton	1,944		
Labour	Catherine Eden	779		
Liberal Democrats	Anne Amboorallee	635		
Liberal Democrats	Robert Saunders	547		
UKIP	Pam McAlester	494		
UKIP	Vicky Millward	419		
UKIP	Sam Whitt	319		
Turnout			46.48	
Conservative hold		Swing		
Conservative hold		Swing		
Conservative hold		Swing		

Kinson North (3 seats)
Party	Candidate	Votes	%	±%
Conservative	Mark Battistini	914		
Conservative	Amedeo Angiolini	891		
Labour	Dennis Gritt	827		
Liberal Democrats	Claire Smith	804		
Conservative	Stuart McKeown	803		
Liberal Democrats	Pat Lewis	788		
Liberal Democrats	Richard Smith	732		
Labour	Helen Rosser	730		
Labour	David Stokes	693		
Independent	Julie Darbyshire	427		
Turnout			37.55	
Conservative gain from Liberal Democrats		Swing		
Conservative gain from Liberal Democrats		Swing		
Labour gain from Liberal Democrats		Swing		

Kinson South (3 seats)
Party	Candidate	Votes	%	±%
Labour	Beryl Baxter	1,043		
Labour	Ben Grower	992		
Conservative	Roger Marley	922		
Labour	Mel Semple	892		
Conservative	Jeremy Old	787		
Conservative	Nicholas Rose	782		
Liberal Democrats	Michael Chizlett	308		
Liberal Democrats	Adam Merrifield	256		
Turnout			31.26	
Labour hold		Swing		
Labour hold		Swing		
Conservative gain from Labour		Swing		

Littledown & Iford (3 seats)
Party	Candidate	Votes	%	±%
Conservative	Nick King	1,865		
Conservative	Jane Montrose	1,755		
Conservative	Lawrence Williams	1,743		
Independent	Margaret Rose	802		
Labour	Roger Ansell	575		
Labour	Debbie Sharman	512		
Liberal Democrats	Shaun Kirkland	397		
Liberal Democrats	Sibanda Innocent	318		
Turnout			41.80	
Conservative hold		Swing		
Conservative hold		Swing		
Conservative gain from Liberal Democrats		Swing		
