= 2007 Bournemouth Borough Council election =

2007 UK local government election

Map of results of 2007 election

Elections to Bournemouth Borough Council on the south coast of England were held on 3 May 2007. The whole council (a unitary authority) was up for election.

== Background ==
The council apologised after an election pack sent to candidates included offensive language.

== Election result ==
Bournemouth Election Result 2007
| Party | Seats | Gains | Losses | Net gain/loss | Seats % | Votes % | Votes | +/− |
|---|---|---|---|---|---|---|---|---|
| Conservative | 41 | 23 | 1 | +22 | 75.9 | 52.76 | 62,311 | +15.36 |
| Liberal Democrats | 7 | 0 | 23 | -23 | 13.0 | 26.58 | 31,397 | -18.28 |
| Labour | 3 | 0 | 0 | 0 | 5.5 | 9.01 | 10,639 | -0.50 |
| Independent | 3 | 1 | 0 | +1 | 5.5 | 6.68 | 7,895 | +0.64 |
| UKIP | 0 | 0 | 0 | 0 | 0.0 | 3.56 | 4,200 | +1.90 |
| Green | 0 | 0 | 0 | 0 | 0.0 | 0.89 | 1,053 | |
| BNP | 0 | 0 | 0 | 0 | 0.0 | 0.39 | 458 | +0.13 |
| Your neighbour, our neighbourhood | 0 | 0 | 0 | 0 | 0.0 | 0.13 | 154 | |
