= 2015 Bournemouth Borough Council election =

2015 UK local government election

Map of the results of the 2015 Bournemouth council election. Conservatives in blue, UK Independence Party in purple, Green Party in green and independents in light grey.

The 2015 Bournemouth Borough Council election took place on 7 May 2015 to elect members of Bournemouth Borough Council in England. This was on the same day as other local elections.

In June 2015, a legal challenge was submitted challenging the result in the Kinson South ward.

== Composition of council seats before election ==
Party	Seats
Conservative	44
Independent	4
Labour	3
Liberal Democrats	1
Non-aligned	2
