= Bournemouth Borough Council =

Local council for Bournemouth, Dorset, England

Coordinates: 50°43′N 1°53′W

- Coat of arms of Bounemouth Borough Council

Type
- Type: Unitary authority

History
- Founded: 27 August 1890
- Disbanded: 1 April 2019
- Succeeded by: Bournemouth, Christchurch and Poole Council

Leadership
- Mayor: Derek Borthwick, Conservative since 28 May 2019
- Leader: John Beesley, Conservative since 21 Feb 2012
- Chief Executive: Tony Williams since 2012 until March 2017

Structure
- Seats: 54
- Political groups: Administration (51) Conservative (51) Other parties (3) Independent (2) Green (1)
- Length of term: 4 years

Elections
- Voting system: Multiple member first-past-the-post
- Last election: 7 May 2015

Meeting place
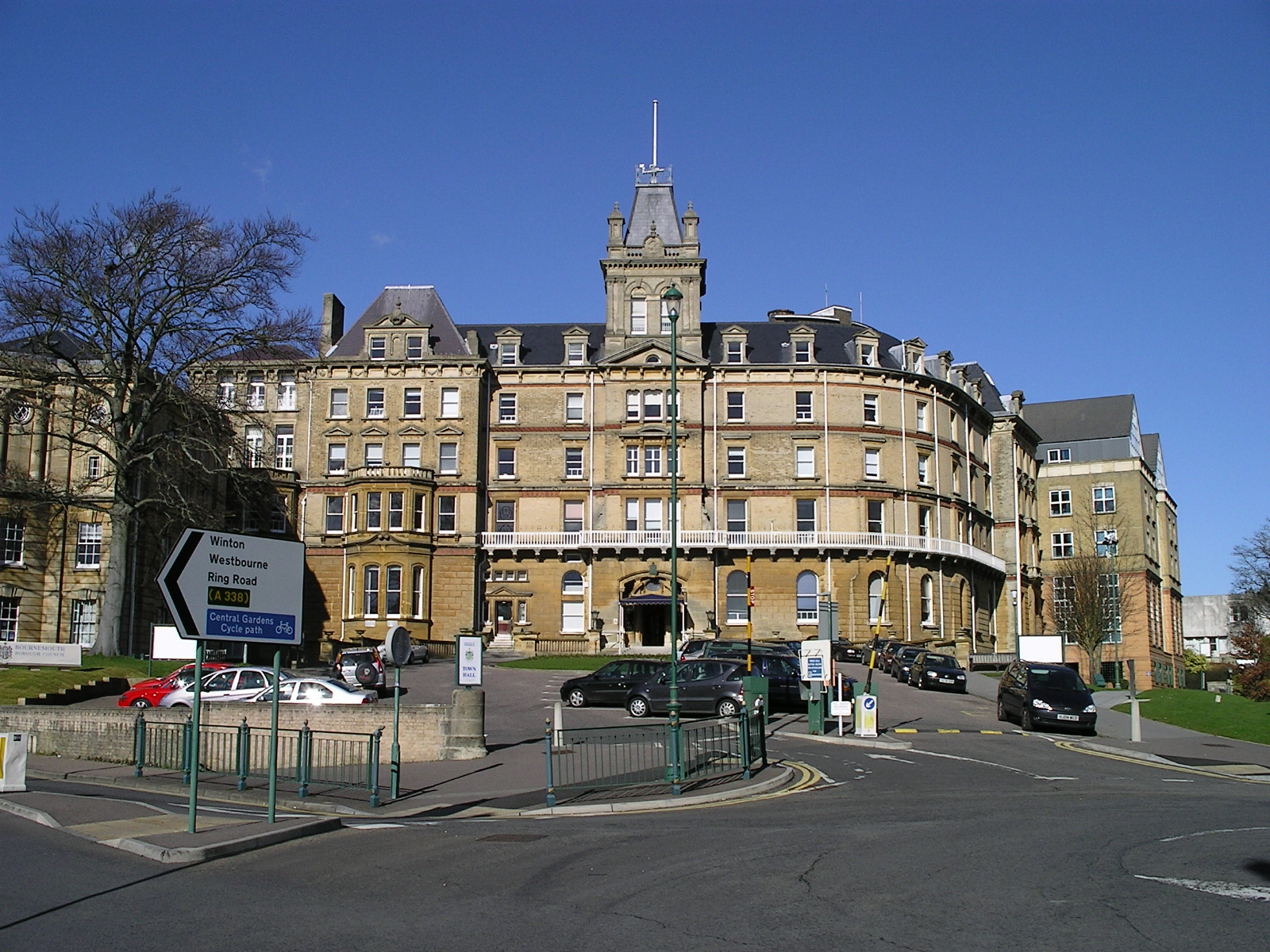
- Bournemouth Town Hall

Website
- www.bournemouth.gov.uk

Bournemouth Borough Council was the local authority of Bournemouth in Dorset, England and ceased to exist on 1 April 2019. It was a unitary authority, although between 1974 and 1997 it was an administrative district council with Dorset. Previously most of the borough was part of Hampshire.

The borough can trace its history back to 27 August 1890 when the Municipal Borough of Bournemouth was created by royal charter. On 1 April 1900 it received county borough status which lasted until 1974.

In February 2018 the 'Future Dorset' plan was approved by the Secretary of State for Housing, Communities and Local Government Sajid Javid. Bournemouth, Christchurch and Poole borough councils merged on 1 April 2019 into Bournemouth, Christchurch and Poole Council.

== Government and politics ==
The borough was administered by Bournemouth Borough Council.

=== Wards ===
The council had 18 wards covering the borough.

- Boscombe East
- Boscombe West
- Central
- East Cliff & Springbourne
- East Southbourne & Tuckton
- Kinson North
- Kinson South
- Littledown & Iford
- Moordown
- Queen's Park
- Redhill & Northbourne
- Strouden Park
- Talbot & Branksome Woods
- Throop & Muscliff
- Wallisdown & Winton West
- West Southbourne
- Westbourne & West Cliff
- Winton East

=== Composition ===
The council consisted of 54 elected members, 3 from each of the 18 wards. Prior to 2003 there were 19 wards (57 members). Elections took place every four years where all seats were contested.

The composition of the council:

Party	1999 Election	2003 Election	2007 Election	May 2010	2011 Election	May 2012	2015 Election	May 2017	May 2018
Conservative	25	16	41	37	45	46	51	52	51
Liberal Democrat	20	33	7	9	3	2	0	0	0
Labour	6	3	3	3	3	3	0	0	0
Independent	6	2	3	5	3	3	1	1	2
UKIP	0	0	0	0	0	0	1	0	0
Green	0	0	0	0	0	0	1	1	1
Total	57	54	54	54	54	54	54	54	54

The council was abolished on 1 April 2019 and replaced by Bournemouth, Christchurch and Poole Council.

== Coat of arms ==
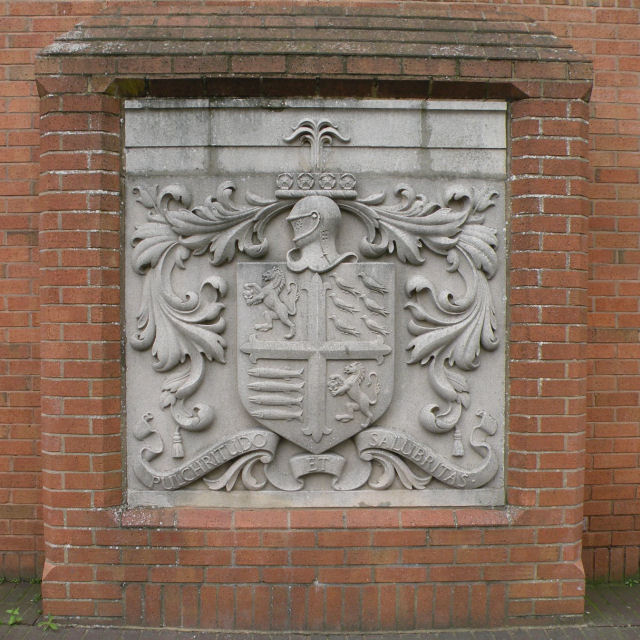
The coat of arms of Bournemouth

The arms of Bournemouth were granted on 24 March 1891.

== See also ==
- Bournemouth local elections
